= List of Serbian football transfers winter 2016–17 =

- This is a list of transfers in Serbian football for the 2016–17 winter transfer window.
- Moves featuring Serbian SuperLiga and Serbian First League sides are listed.
- The order by which the clubs are listed is equal to the classification at the mid-season of the 2016–17 Serbian SuperLiga and 2016–17 Serbian First League.

== Serbian SuperLiga ==
=== Red Star Belgrade ===
In: Note: Flags indicate national team as defined under FIFA eligibility rules; some limited exceptions apply. Players may hold more than one non-FIFA nationality.

No.	Pos.	Nation	Player
—	FW	Montenegro	Miloš Vukić (loan return from Vršac)
—	DF	Serbia	Bogdan Račić (loan return from Sremac Vojka, to youth team)
—	MF	Serbia	Nemanja Tomašević (loan return from Lokomotiva Beograd, to youth team)
—	MF	Serbia	Đorđe Petrović (loan return from Prva Iskra, to youth team)
—	GK	Serbia	Uroš Kostić (loan return from Mladenovac, to youth team)
—	MF	Serbia	Miroslav Sićović (loan return from Grafičar Beograd, to youth team)
16	FW	Serbia	Nemanja Milić (from Spartak Subotica)
69	FW	Serbia	Srđan Vujaklija (from Borac Čačak)
9	FW	Serbia	Milan Pavkov (from Radnički Niš)
5	DF	Ghana	Abraham Frimpong (from Napredak Kruševac)
14	FW	Ghana	Richmond Boakye (on loan from (Italy) Latina)
10	MF	Serbia	Nenad Milijaš (on loan from (China) Nei Mongol Zhongyou)
29	DF	Brazil	Mateus Viveiros (from (Brazil) São Paulo, to youth team)
—	DF	North Macedonia	Antonio Mitrev (from (North Macedonia) Metalurg Skopje, to youth team)
—	DF	Serbia	Nemanja Stojić (from Voždovac, to youth team)
—	DF	Serbia	Filip Stanković (loan return from OFK Beograd)
—	MF	Serbia	Stefan Ćosić (loan return from Grafičar Beograd)
—	FW	Iceland	Đorđe Panić (from (Iceland) Fjölnir, to youth team)

Out: Note: Flags indicate national team as defined under FIFA eligibility rules; some limited exceptions apply. Players may hold more than one non-FIFA nationality.

No.	Pos.	Nation	Player
—	FW	Serbia	Petar Milić (to (France) Angers reserve team)
24	MF	North Macedonia	Daniel Avramovski (to (Slovenia) Olimpija Ljubljana)
31	GK	Serbia	Marko Trkulja (to Kolubara)
70	FW	Portugal	Hugo Vieira (to (Japan) Yokohama F. Marinos)
—	DF	Serbia	Nikola Pejović (to Zemun)
97	DF	Guadeloupe	Thomas Phibel (to (Russia) Anzhi)
19	DF	Serbia	Miloš Cvetković (to Napredak Kruševac)
11	FW	Argentina	Pablo Mouche (loan return to (Brazil) Palmeiras)
29	MF	Serbia	Nikola Jovanović (to Sinđelić Beograd, was on loan at Bežanija)
95	FW	Serbia	Stefan Ilić (on loan to Radnički Niš)
18	MF	North Macedonia	David Babunski (to (Japan) Yokohama F. Marinos)
16	DF	New Zealand	Adam Mitchell (to (Slovenia) Celje, was on loan at OFK Beograd)
94	MF	Montenegro	Vladimir Jovović (on loan to Spartak Subotica, was on loan at Napredak Kruševac)
—	MF	Serbia	Nemanja Vukmanović (to Metalac G. M.)
—	FW	Serbia	Lazar Romanić (on loan to OFK Beograd)
—	FW	Serbia	Milan Senić (on loan to OFK Beograd, previously brought from (Germany) Bayer Leverkusen)
—	DF	Serbia	Draško Đorđević (on loan to OFK Beograd, previously brought Bežanija)
—	FW	Serbia	Momčilo Krstić (to Rad)
41	GK	Serbia	Jovan Vićić (on loan to Bežanija, was on loan at Kolubara)
—	FW	Serbia	Milan Panović (on loan to Bežanija)
—	GK	Serbia	Ilija Ćatić (on loan to Grafičar Beograd, previously brought from Brodarac)
—	FW	Serbia	Marko Platiša (loan extension to Grafičar Beograd)
32	GK	Serbia	Aleksandar Stanković (loan extension to Grafičar Beograd)
—	MF	Serbia	Andrija Crnadak (loan extension to Grafičar Beograd)
—	MF	Serbia	Milan Milanović (loan extension to Grafičar Beograd)
—	MF	Serbia	Viktor Živojinović (loan extension to Grafičar Beograd)
—	MF	Serbia	Miloš Z. Nikolić (on loan to Grafičar Beograd)
—	MF	Serbia	Nikola Puzić (on loan to Grafičar Beograd)
36	MF	Serbia	Lazar Tufegdžić (to Sinđelić Beograd, was on loan at OFK Beograd)
77	DF	Serbia	Zoran Rendulić (to (Kazakhstan) Ordabasy)
—	FW	Serbia	Aleksa Dačić (to OFK Beograd, was on loan at Grafičar Beograd)

=== Partizan ===
In: Note: Flags indicate national team as defined under FIFA eligibility rules; some limited exceptions apply. Players may hold more than one non-FIFA nationality.

No.	Pos.	Nation	Player
3	FW	Cameroon	Léandre Tawamba (from (Kazakhstan) Kairat)
—	MF	Serbia	Arton Zekaj (loan return from Bačka BP, to youth team)
13	DF	Libya	Mohamed El Monir (from (Belarus) Dinamo Minsk)
95	MF	Montenegro	Marko Janković (was on loan, now signed from (Greece) Olympiacos)
—	FW	Serbia	Nikola Lakčević (from OFK Beograd, to youth team)
—	MF	Serbia	Lazar Nikolić (from OFK Beograd, to youth team)
—	FW	Serbia	Vukašin Jovković (from OFK Beograd, to youth team)

Out: Note: Flags indicate national team as defined under FIFA eligibility rules; some limited exceptions apply. Players may hold more than one non-FIFA nationality.

No.	Pos.	Nation	Player
6	DF	Slovenia	Gregor Balažic (to (Russia) Ural)
51	DF	Ivory Coast	Cédric Gogoua (to (Latvia) Riga)
—	FW	Serbia	Nemanja Perić (released, was on loan at Teleoptik)
40	FW	Serbia	Nikola Đurđić (to (Denmark) Randers)
86	FW	Bulgaria	Valeri Bojinov (to (China) Meizhou Hakka)
—	DF	Bosnia and Herzegovina	Marko Čubrilo (on loan to Teleoptik)
14	DF	Serbia	Miroslav Bogosavac (to Čukarički)
—	FW	Serbia	Bogdan Radojković (to OFK Beograd)
37	FW	Serbia	Miloš Kukolj (on loan to IMT)
1	GK	Serbia	Đorđe Lazović (on loan to Teleoptik, last with OFK Beograd)
—	MF	Serbia	Vladan Ružić (on loan to Teleoptik)
99	FW	Serbia	Đorđe Jovanović (on loan to Teleoptik)
5	DF	Serbia	Strahinja Bošnjak (on loan to Teleoptik)
—	DF	Serbia	Dušan Todorović (on loan to Cement Beočin, was on loan at Teleoptik)
—	DF	Serbia	Miloš Perišić (on loan to OFK Odžaci, was on loan at Radnički Pirot)
19	MF	Serbia	Uroš Damnjanović (to (Slovakia) Slovan Bratislava)
—	GK	Serbia	Jovan Trnić (loan extension to Teleoptik)
—	DF	Serbia	Stefan Grbović (loan extension to Teleoptik)
—	FW	Serbia	Strahinja Jovanović (on loan to Teleoptik)
—	FW	Serbia	Živorad Arnautović (on loan to Lokomotiva Beograd)
—	DF	Serbia	Miloš Ostojić (to (Belarus) BATE Borisov)

=== Vojvodina ===
In: Note: Flags indicate national team as defined under FIFA eligibility rules; some limited exceptions apply. Players may hold more than one non-FIFA nationality.

No.	Pos.	Nation	Player
5	MF	Serbia	Nikola Kovačević (loan return from Spartak Subotica)
95	MF	Serbia	Milan Spremo (from Javor Ivanjica)
51	DF	Serbia	Mario Maslać (from Borac Čačak)
4	DF	Serbia	Emir Lotinac (from (Singapore) Balestier Khalsa)
3	DF	Serbia	Filip Babić (from Proleter Novi Sad)
1	GK	Serbia	Emil Rockov (from Proleter Novi Sad)
31	FW	Serbia	Uroš Stamenić (loan return from Proleter Novi Sad)
21	FW	Montenegro	Stefan Đorđević (from (Montenegro) Jedinstvo Bijelo Polje)
—	FW	Serbia	Nikola Gajić (loan return from Cement Beočin, to youth squad)
—	FW	Serbia	Miodrag Maljković (from Jagodina, to youth squad)
—	FW	Ghana	Francis Afriyie (on loan from (Ghana) Bechem United)
66	DF	Ghana	Joseph Bempah (free, last with (Ghana) Bechem United)

Out: Note: Flags indicate national team as defined under FIFA eligibility rules; some limited exceptions apply. Players may hold more than one non-FIFA nationality.

No.	Pos.	Nation	Player
9	FW	Serbia	Nikola Ašćerić (to (Japan) Tokushima Vortis)
4	MF	Serbia	Dušan Mićić (to (Uzbekistan) Bunyodkor)
—	MF	Serbia	Anđelo Kačavenda (to (Ukraine) Zorya Luhansk)
28	MF	Serbia	Novica Maksimović (to (Kazakhstan) Atyrau)
44	FW	Serbia	Nenad Gavrić (to Mladost Lučani)
5	DF	Serbia	Vladimir Kovačević (to (Belgium) Kortrijk)
—	DF	Serbia	David Hrubik (to (Switzerland) Lausanne-Sport youth squad, was on loan at Proleter Novi Sad)
27	DF	Bosnia and Herzegovina	Dženan Bureković (on loan to (Bosnia and Herzegovina) Čelik Zenica)
—	DF	Serbia	Dejan Zeljković (to Proleter Novi Sad)
—	MF	Serbia	Srđan Šćepanović (on loan to Proleter Novi Sad)
32	GK	Serbia	Marko Ilić (on loan to Proleter Novi Sad)
24	MF	Serbia	Marko Đurišić (loan extension to Proleter Novi Sad)
—	DF	Greece	Giannis Charontakis (released, previously brought from (Greece) Veria)
—	MF	Bosnia and Herzegovina	Darko Jović (on loan to OFK Odžaci, previously brought from Proleter Novi Sad)
26	MF	Serbia	Petar Mićin (on loan to Crvena Zvezda NS)
—	DF	Serbia	Đorđe Knežević (on loan to Crvena Zvezda NS)
—	DF	Serbia	Miloš Radaković (to Veternik)
—	FW	Serbia	Kosta Aleksić (to Bečej)
—	FW	Serbia	Vuk Španović (to Srbobran)
—	MF	Bosnia and Herzegovina	Srđan Đuranović (to (Croatia) Lokomotiva Zagreb)
19	FW	Serbia	Miloš Trifunović (to Radnik Surdulica)

=== Napredak Kruševac ===
In: Note: Flags indicate national team as defined under FIFA eligibility rules; some limited exceptions apply. Players may hold more than one non-FIFA nationality.

No.	Pos.	Nation	Player
9	FW	Serbia	Nemanja Vidaković (from OFK Beograd)
33	GK	Serbia	Lazar Tatić (free, last with Radnik Surdulica)
55	DF	Serbia	Nemanja Tubić (from (Norway) Haugesund)
22	MF	Serbia	Enver Alivodić (from Novi Pazar)
13	FW	Montenegro	Filip Kasalica (from (Kazakhstan) Ordabasy)
18	FW	Russia	Daur Kvekveskiri (from (Russia) Krasnodar, to youth team)
6	DF	Bosnia and Herzegovina	Nikola Eskić (from (Bosnia and Herzegovina) Zvijezda 09)
3	DF	Serbia	Miloš Cvetković (from Red Star Belgrade)

Out: Note: Flags indicate national team as defined under FIFA eligibility rules; some limited exceptions apply. Players may hold more than one non-FIFA nationality.

No.	Pos.	Nation	Player
22	MF	Montenegro	Vladimir Jovović (loan return to Red Star Belgrade)
14	FW	Serbia	Georgije Ilić (to Rad)
97	GK	Serbia	Stefan Stojanović (to Jagodina, was on loan at Radnički Obrenovac)
13	FW	Serbia	Bratislav Punoševac (to Borac Čačak)
18	DF	Serbia	Nikola Leković (to (Belarus) Dinamo Minsk)
6	DF	Ghana	Abraham Frimpong (to Red Star Belgrade)
9	FW	Serbia	Darko Lemajić (was on loan, now signed with Inđija)
21	DF	Serbia	Dragan Žarković (on loan to Radnik Surdulica)
79	FW	Serbia	Andrija Majdevac (on loan to Dinamo Vranje, was on loan at Temnić)
31	MF	Serbia	Saša Filipović (to (Armenia) Alashkert)
—	FW	Serbia	Mladen Sarajlin (to Crvena Zvezda Pavliš)
—	GK	Serbia	Filip Janaćković (on loan to Dubočica)
45	DF	Serbia	Nikola Radmanovac (on loan to Brodarac 1947, was on loan at Trstenik PPT)
—		Serbia	Dušan Nikolić (to Sinđelić Niš)
3	MF	Serbia	Boris Varga (to Bačka BP)

=== Mladost Lučani ===
In: Note: Flags indicate national team as defined under FIFA eligibility rules; some limited exceptions apply. Players may hold more than one non-FIFA nationality.

No.	Pos.	Nation	Player
20	MF	Serbia	Matija Protić (loan return from Sloga Požega)
77	MF	Serbia	Predrag Pavlović (from (Lithuania) Sūduva)
22	GK	Serbia	Zlatko Zečević (from Novi Pazar)
44	DF	Serbia	Bogdan Milošević (from (France) Tours)
12	FW	Serbia	Nenad Gavrić (from Vojvodina)
16	FW	Serbia	Bojan Čečarić (loan return from Novi Pazar)
58	DF	Serbia	Miloš Ristić (loan return from Sloga Požega)
14	FW	Serbia	Marko Simić (loan return from Kolubara)

Out: Note: Flags indicate national team as defined under FIFA eligibility rules; some limited exceptions apply. Players may hold more than one non-FIFA nationality.

No.	Pos.	Nation	Player
3	DF	North Macedonia	Tome Kitanovski (to (Croatia) Istra 1961)
—	MF	Serbia	Predrag Luka (on loan to OFK Beograd)
23	GK	Serbia	Dragan Rosić (on loan to Kolubara)
6	FW	Serbia	Nikola Pantović (to LFK Mladost Lučani)
—	GK	Serbia	Danko Savanović (released)
21	MF	Serbia	Nikola Tasić (to (Slovakia) Javorník Makov)

=== Javor Ivanjica ===
In: Note: Flags indicate national team as defined under FIFA eligibility rules; some limited exceptions apply. Players may hold more than one non-FIFA nationality.

No.	Pos.	Nation	Player
—	FW	Serbia	Aleksandar Dimitrić (loan return from Kolubara)
—	MF	Serbia	Nemanja Živković (loan return from Sloboda Užice)
18	FW	Serbia	Stefan D. Tripković (from BSK Borča)
30	MF	Serbia	Milan Milanović (from Sloboda Užice)
31	DF	Serbia	Milijan Ilić (from IMT)
22	DF	Canada	Derek Cornelius (from (Germany) VfR Neumünster)
25	MF	Serbia	Vuk Mitošević (from (Kazakhstan) Aktobe)
8	MF	Serbia	Danko Kiković (from BSK Borča)
26	MF	Ghana	Jonas Asare (from (Cameroon) Grassland)

Out: Note: Flags indicate national team as defined under FIFA eligibility rules; some limited exceptions apply. Players may hold more than one non-FIFA nationality.

No.	Pos.	Nation	Player
15	FW	Bosnia and Herzegovina	Ismar Tandir (to (Bosnia and Herzegovina) Sloboda Tuzla)
26	MF	Serbia	Miloš Milisavljević (released)
9	FW	Greece	Andreas Vlachomitros (loan return to (Greece) AEK Athens)
30	FW	Serbia	Darko Bjedov (to (Belgium) Gent)
19	MF	Serbia	Jovan Đokić (to (Kazakhstan) Atyrau)
18	FW	Serbia	Nikola Vujović (to Lokomotiva Beograd)
25	MF	Serbia	Milan Spremo (to Vojvodina)
31	FW	Serbia	Andrija Ratković (to Karađorđe Topola, was on loan at Radnički Obrenovac)
8	MF	Serbia	Jordan Jovanović (on loan to BSK Borča)
19	FW	Serbia	Filip Obadović (on loan to Budućnost Krušik, previously brought from the same club)
—		Serbia	Zoran Živanović (to Budućnost Arilje)
—		Serbia	Nikola Nešovanović (to Budućnost Arilje)
9	FW	Serbia	Nikola Dišić (on loan Mihajlovac 1934, previously brought from the same club)
—	MF	Serbia	Filip Lakićević (loan extension to Zlatibor Čajetina)
6	DF	North Macedonia	Nikola Stojanov (on loan to IMT, was on loan at Sloboda Užice)
—	DF	Serbia	Nikola Bjelanović (loan extension to IMT)

=== Radnički Niš ===
In: Note: Flags indicate national team as defined under FIFA eligibility rules; some limited exceptions apply. Players may hold more than one non-FIFA nationality.

No.	Pos.	Nation	Player
67	MF	Serbia	Nikola Mitrović (loan return from Sinđelić Niš)
28	MF	Japan	Ryota Noma (from (Montenegro) Rudar Pljevlja)
9	MF	Bosnia and Herzegovina	Anid Travančić (from Novi Pazar)
3	DF	Montenegro	Vladimir Volkov (free, last with (Belgium) Mechelen)
40	DF	Serbia	Milan Perendija (free, last with (Russia) Mordovia)
95	FW	Serbia	Stefan Ilić (on loan from Red Star Belgrade)
89	GK	Montenegro	Bojan Zogović (from Novi Pazar)
36	FW	Serbia	Nemanja Kojić (from (Turkey) Gaziantep BB)
—	MF	Bosnia and Herzegovina	Elmin Hadžikadunić (from (Bosnia and Herzegovina) Borac Jelah)
16	MF	Serbia	Marko Tomić (from Čukarički)
69	MF	Serbia	Marko Listeš (loan return from Car Konstantin)

Out: Note: Flags indicate national team as defined under FIFA eligibility rules; some limited exceptions apply. Players may hold more than one non-FIFA nationality.

No.	Pos.	Nation	Player
17	FW	Latvia	Anastasijs Mordatenko (loan return to (Latvia) Ventspils)
18	GK	Russia	Ivan Konovalov (to Bačka BP)
99	FW	Russia	Ramazan Isayev (released)
55	DF	Serbia	Miloš Radivojević (to Rad)
9	FW	Serbia	Milan Pavkov (to Red Star Belgrade)
15	DF	Serbia	Aleksandar Ignjatović (to Novi Pazar)
44	DF	Serbia	Dušan Ivanov (to Borac Čačak)
26	DF	Montenegro	Nemanja Kartal (to (Bosnia and Herzegovina) Krupa)
12	GK	Serbia	Miloš Perić (was on loan, now signed with Car Konstantin)
—	FW	Serbia	Marko Branković (on loan to Ozren Sokobanja, was on loan at Car Konstantin)
—	FW	Serbia	Momčilo Cvetković (to Železničar Pančevo)
—	DF	Serbia	Nemanja Ljubisavljević (on loan to Dinamo Vranje, previously brought from Jagodina)
—		Serbia	Lazar Ranđelović (on loan to Car Konstantin, previously brought from Radan Lebane)
—	DF	Serbia	Mitar Mladenović (loan extension to Sinđelić Niš)
—	DF	Serbia	Ivan Mladenović (on loan to Budućnost Popovac, was on loan Jedinstvo Putevi)
27	FW	Serbia	Lazar Mitrović (on loan to (Czech Republic) Bohemians 1905, youth team)

=== Spartak Subotica ===
In: Note: Flags indicate national team as defined under FIFA eligibility rules; some limited exceptions apply. Players may hold more than one non-FIFA nationality.

No.	Pos.	Nation	Player
—	FW	Serbia	Aleksandar Crnojački (loan return from ČSK Čelarevo, to youth team)
—	MF	Serbia	Jovan Lazić (loan return from Subotica, to youth team)
—	DF	Serbia	Vojislav Stanaćev (loan return from Subotica, to youth team)
27	DF	Serbia	Dimitrije Tomović (loan return from ČSK Čelarevo)
21	DF	Slovenia	Aljaž Krefl (on loan from (Slovenia) Olimpija Ljubljana)
9	MF	Montenegro	Vladimir Jovović (on loan from Red Star Belgrade)
28	FW	North Macedonia	Emil Abaz (from (Croatia) Dinamo Zagreb II)
26	FW	Montenegro	Milan Purović (free, last with (Malaysia) Kuantan FA)
1	GK	Serbia	Bojan Jović (from Zemun)
12	GK	Serbia	Miloš Ostojić (from Voždovac)
19	FW	Serbia	Nemanja Nikolić (from (Kazakhstan) Aktobe)
—	FW	Serbia	Marko Varga (from Indeks Novi Sad, to youth team)
2	DF	Serbia	Boško Gajić (from Omladinac NB)
16	MF	Serbia	Marko Pantić (loan return from Hajduk Čurug)
—	MF	Serbia	Bratislav Petrović (from Čukarički, to youth team)

Out: Note: Flags indicate national team as defined under FIFA eligibility rules; some limited exceptions apply. Players may hold more than one non-FIFA nationality.

No.	Pos.	Nation	Player
—		Serbia	Marko Jerković (loan return to TSC)
1	GK	Serbia	Budimir Janošević (to (Sweden) Brommapojkarna)
2	MF	Ukraine	Vadym Zhuk (to (Ukraine) Sumy)
9	MF	Serbia	Andrej Mrkela (to Bežanija)
16	FW	Serbia	Nemanja Milić (to Red Star Belgrade)
21	DF	Serbia	Daniel Farkaš (to (Hungary) Mezőkövesd Zsóry)
26	MF	Serbia	Marko Jondić (released)
19	MF	Serbia	Nikola Kovačević (loan return to Vojvodina)
12	GK	Serbia	Nikola Mirković (to Rad)
33	GK	Serbia	Aleksandar Kesić (released)
27	MF	Nigeria	Nnaemeka Ajuru (to Jagodina)
—	MF	Montenegro	Savo Gazivoda (to Radnik Surdulica, was on loan at (Spain) Extremadura UD)
—	MF	Hungary	David Sinkovics (to TSC)
24	MF	China	Zhong Haoran (to Proleter Novi Sad)
—	DF	Serbia	Bojan Čiča (to Obilić Novi Kneževac)
18	DF	Montenegro	Lazar Đokić (to Dinamo Vranje)
—	MF	Serbia	Miloš Tadić (loan extension to SFS Borac Paraćin)
—	DF	Serbia	Aleksandar Popović (on loan to Bratstvo Prigrevica)
13	MF	Serbia	Danijel Zlatković (on loan to TSC, was on loan at ČSK Čelarevo)
28	FW	Serbia	Milan Đokić (on loan to TSC, was on loan at ČSK Čelarevo)
—	DF	Serbia	Dejan Parezanović (on loan to OFK Odžaci, was on loan at Bačka 1901)
—	DF	Serbia	Nikola Lazarević (to Radnički Ratkovo)
—		Serbia	Predrag Medić (on loan to Omladinac NB, previously brought from TSC)
—	DF	Serbia	Danilo Pejović (on loan to Bačka 1901)
—		Serbia	Marko Stošić (on loan to Bačka 1901, was on loan at Bratstvo Prigrevica)
20	FW	Serbia	Bogdan Stamenković (on loan to Bačka 1901)
—		Serbia	Aleksandar Babić (on loan to Tavankut, was on loan at Subotica)
—		Serbia	Miloš Unić (released, was on loan at Subotica)
—		Serbia	Stefan Simić (on loan to Potisje Kanjiža, was on loan at Bačka 1901)

=== Voždovac ===
In: Note: Flags indicate national team as defined under FIFA eligibility rules; some limited exceptions apply. Players may hold more than one non-FIFA nationality.

No.	Pos.	Nation	Player
13	FW	Serbia	Nenad Marinković (from (Turkey) Gaziantep BB)
3	MF	Serbia	Ognjen Krasić (from (Uzbekistan) Nasaf Qarshi)
11	MF	Serbia	Ivan Marković (from (South Korea) Gyeongnam)
29	FW	Serbia	Borko Duronjić (from OFK Beograd)
20	MF	Montenegro	Nemanja Nikolić (from (Israel) Hapoel Tel Aviv)
41	DF	Serbia	Saša Ivković (loan return from (Israel) Ashdod)

Out: Note: Flags indicate national team as defined under FIFA eligibility rules; some limited exceptions apply. Players may hold more than one non-FIFA nationality.

No.	Pos.	Nation	Player
77	DF	Bosnia and Herzegovina	Bojan Puzigaća (to (Bosnia and Herzegovina) Borac Banja Luka)
29	DF	Serbia	Miloš Vranjanin (to Teleoptik, was on loan at Radnički Obrenovac)
3	DF	Bosnia and Herzegovina	Slaviša Radović (to Zemun)
44	MF	Serbia	Nikola Lukić (to (Belarus) Dinamo Minsk)
—	GK	Serbia	Miloš Ostojić (to Spartak Subotica, was on loan at Hajduk Beograd)
20	MF	Serbia	Branislav Jovanović (to (Israel) Hapoel Ashkelon)
16	DF	Montenegro	Dejan Boljević (to (Malta) Hibernians)
11	FW	Serbia	Jovan Stojanović (to (Belgium) Kortrijk)
27	DF	Germany	Stefan Kukoljac (released, was on loan at Sinđelić Beograd)
13	DF	Serbia	Nemanja Stojić (to Red Star Belgrade)
—		Serbia	Milan Stojanović (to Radnik Surdulica)
—		Serbia	Nenad Matić (to Jedinstvo SP)
—		Serbia	Marko Perišić (to Budućnost Dobanovci)

=== Rad ===
In: Note: Flags indicate national team as defined under FIFA eligibility rules; some limited exceptions apply. Players may hold more than one non-FIFA nationality.

No.	Pos.	Nation	Player
44	MF	Serbia	Filip Bainović (loan return from Žarkovo)
21	DF	Serbia	Tomislav Pajović (from (Israel) Maccabi Sha'arayim)
20	DF	Montenegro	Vladimir Rodić (on loan from (Turkey) Kardemir)
80	GK	Serbia	Marko Lazarević (from Bežanija)
27	FW	Serbia	Lazar Milošev (from Borac Sakule)
50	DF	Serbia	Miloš Radivojević (from Radnički Niš)
91	GK	Serbia	Nikola Mirković (from Spartak Subotica)
32	MF	Serbia	Nikola Dimitrijević (from Novi Pazar)
4	DF	Serbia	Strahinja Bačanin (from Vršac)
9	FW	Serbia	Boško Guzina (from Žarkovo)
—	FW	Serbia	Momčilo Krstić (from Red Star Belgrade, to youth team)
—	MF	Serbia	Jovan Vučetić (from Čukarički, to youth team)
—	FW	South Korea	Jong-Won Hwang (from (Philippines) Manila Nomads)

Out: Note: Flags indicate national team as defined under FIFA eligibility rules; some limited exceptions apply. Players may hold more than one non-FIFA nationality.

No.	Pos.	Nation	Player
44	DF	Bosnia and Herzegovina	Petar Jovanović (to Čukarički)
20	MF	Serbia	Dejan Rusmir (retired)
86	DF	Serbia	Miloš Marković (to Borac Čačak)
9	FW	Serbia	Miljan Mrdaković (to OFK Beograd)
7	MF	Serbia	Miloš Krstić (to Novi Pazar)
88	MF	Serbia	Marko Stanojević (to (Kazakhstan) Shakhter Karagandy)
—	MF	Serbia	Marko Keča (released)
66	GK	Serbia	Miloš Budaković (to Novi Pazar)
—	FW	Serbia	Milorad Dabić (on loan to Sinđelić Beograd)
—	DF	Serbia	Ivan Kričak (on loan to Sinđelić Beograd, previously brought from Žarkovo)
—	DF	Serbia	Strahinja Tanasijević (was on loan, now signed with Žarkovo)
3	DF	Serbia	Luka Petrović (loan extension to Žarkovo)
12	GK	Serbia	Dušan Marković (loan extension to Žarkovo)
18	FW	Serbia	Marko Jović (on loan to Žarkovo)
15	MF	Serbia	Marko Stojanović (on loan to Žarkovo)
—	GK	Montenegro	Sava Mugoša (to BSK Batajnica, was on loan at Vršac)
—	FW	Serbia	Georgije Ilić (on loan to ČSK Čelarevo, previously brought from Napredak Kruševac)
22	MF	Montenegro	Stefan Lončar (to (Montenegro) Sutjeska Nikšić)
2	DF	Serbia	Matija Košanin (on loan to IMT)
16	MF	Montenegro	Nikola Drinčić (released)

=== Metalac G. M. ===
In: Note: Flags indicate national team as defined under FIFA eligibility rules; some limited exceptions apply. Players may hold more than one non-FIFA nationality.

No.	Pos.	Nation	Player
23	MF	Serbia	Aleksandar Martinović (loan return from Polet Ljubić)
9	MF	Montenegro	Miloš Krkotić (from (Montenegro) Zeta)
1	GK	Serbia	Ivan Kostić (from Radnički Pirot)
—	MF	Serbia	Stefan Vukadin (from Teleoptik)
24	MF	Serbia	Nemanja Vukmanović (from Red Star Belgrade)
11	FW	Serbia	Marko Nikolić (from Stepojevac Vaga)
42	GK	Serbia	Marko Minić (from Srem Jakovo)
5	MF	Serbia	Božidar Veškovac (from OFK Beograd)
—		Serbia	Emil Bugarin (from Vršac, to youth team)
—	GK	Serbia	Mattia Miljojković (from Kiker, to youth team)
32	DF	Serbia	Bojan Mijailović (loan return from Kolubara)

Out: Note: Flags indicate national team as defined under FIFA eligibility rules; some limited exceptions apply. Players may hold more than one non-FIFA nationality.

No.	Pos.	Nation	Player
5	DF	Serbia	Dejan Uzelac (to (Bosnia and Herzegovina) Olimpik Sarajevo)
11	MF	Serbia	Nemanja Mladenović (to (Norway) Bodø/Glimt)
24	MF	Serbia	Milan Stojanović (to (Kazakhstan) Shakhter Karagandy)
30	FW	Croatia	Ante Mitrović (released)
—	GK	Serbia	Ivan Ristović (loan return to Radnički Kragujevac)
42	GK	Serbia	Stevan Bojović (was on loan, now signed with Takovo)
4	MF	Serbia	Bojan Gočanin (on loan to Karađorđe Topola)

=== Čukarički ===
In: Note: Flags indicate national team as defined under FIFA eligibility rules; some limited exceptions apply. Players may hold more than one non-FIFA nationality.

No.	Pos.	Nation	Player
22	DF	Bosnia and Herzegovina	Petar Jovanović (from Rad)
15	DF	Montenegro	Boris Kopitović (from (Montenegro) Mladost Podgorica)
18	MF	Serbia	Nemanja Obradović (from (Greece) Acharnaikos)
17	MF	Montenegro	Darko Zorić (from (Greece) AEK)
96	DF	Serbia	Miroslav Bogosavac (from Partizan)

Out: Note: Flags indicate national team as defined under FIFA eligibility rules; some limited exceptions apply. Players may hold more than one non-FIFA nationality.

No.	Pos.	Nation	Player
17	DF	Serbia	Nikola Janković (to (Slovenia) Krško)
8	MF	Montenegro	Branislav Janković (to (Montenegro) Rudar Pljevlja)
62	DF	Serbia	Jovan Simić (to Dunav Prahovo)
—	DF	Bosnia and Herzegovina	Branko Bajić (to (Slovakia) DAC Dunajská Streda youth team)
22	FW	Serbia	Lazar Đurović (to Zemun)
4	DF	Brazil	Lucas Piasentin (released)
89	DF	Montenegro	Darko Bulatović (to (Iceland) KA)
—	FW	Serbia	Filip Đurović (to Šumadija Kragujevac)
15	FW	Bosnia and Herzegovina	Budimir Šarčević (to BASK, was on loan at Budućnost Dobanovci)
35	GK	Serbia	Dušan Čubraković (to BASK, was on loan at Sinđelić Beograd)
42	DF	Serbia	Nemanja Cvetković (on loan to BASK)
66	MF	Serbia	Marko Tomić (to Radnički Niš)
33	DF	Serbia	Stefan Živković (to (Kazakhstan) Irtysh Pavlodar)
—	MF	Serbia	Bratislav Petrović (to Spartak Subotica)
9	FW	Ivory Coast	Ismaël Béko Fofana (on loan to (Kazakhstan) Irtysh Pavlodar)
—	MF	Serbia	Jovan Vučetić (to Rad, was on loan at Lokomotiva Beograd)

=== Radnik Surdulica ===
In: Note: Flags indicate national team as defined under FIFA eligibility rules; some limited exceptions apply. Players may hold more than one non-FIFA nationality.

No.	Pos.	Nation	Player
14	FW	Montenegro	Mladen Vukasović (from ČSK Čelarevo)
9	MF	Serbia	Nikola Žakula (from ČSK Čelarevo)
19	MF	Serbia	Ivan Đorić (was on loan, now signed from (Switzerland) Sion)
6	MF	Serbia	Lazar Ivić (from Mačva Šabac)
23	MF	Montenegro	Savo Gazivoda (from Spartak Subotica)
5	DF	Serbia	Nemanja Anđelković (from Zlatibor Čajetina)
20	MF	Serbia	Nemanja Arsenijević (from (Greece) Sparta)
25	DF	Serbia	Dragan Žarković (on loan from Napredak Kruševac)
—	MF	China	Yuan Xue (from (China) Hunan Billows)
12	GK	Serbia	Miloš Ivanović (from Vlasina)
18	FW	Serbia	Miloš Trifunović (from Vojvodina)

Out: Note: Flags indicate national team as defined under FIFA eligibility rules; some limited exceptions apply. Players may hold more than one non-FIFA nationality.

No.	Pos.	Nation	Player
9	FW	Montenegro	Stefan Nikolić (to (Kazakhstan) Kaisar)
23	FW	Montenegro	Luka Merdović (to (Greece) Agrotikos Asteras)
20	MF	Bosnia and Herzegovina	Igor Mišan (to (Malta) Hamrun Spartans)
6	MF	Serbia	Nikola Krčmarević (to (Greece) Panelefsiniakos)
—	MF	Serbia	Nenad Lukić (was on loan, now signed with Zemun)
14	FW	Serbia	Uroš Nenadović (to (Armenia) Alashkert)
5	DF	Serbia	Danijel Stojković (to (Armenia) Alashkert)
—		Serbia	Milan Stojanović (on loan to Temnić, previously brought from Voždovac)
—		Serbia	Iljasa Zulfiu (on loan to Pukovac)
—	DF	Serbia	Miroslav Jovčić (to Ozren Sokobanja, was on loan at Morava Vladičin Han)

=== Bačka BP ===
In: Note: Flags indicate national team as defined under FIFA eligibility rules; some limited exceptions apply. Players may hold more than one non-FIFA nationality.

No.	Pos.	Nation	Player
1	GK	Russia	Ivan Konovalov (from Radnički Niš)
8	MF	Serbia	Milan Makarić (free, last with Spartak Subotica)
16	FW	Ghana	Bismarck Appiah (from Proleter Novi Sad)
13	DF	Montenegro	Marko Vidović (from Sinđelić Beograd)
17	MF	Serbia	Uroš Stepanović (from Kolubara)
—		Serbia	Jovan Kaluđerović (from Palić, to youth team)
3	DF	Serbia	Dušan Mijić (from (Bosnia and Herzegovina) Krupa)
25	GK	Montenegro	Nemanja Jevrić (from (Montenegro) Dečić)
11	FW	Serbia	Milan Stavrić (from Dinamo Vranje)
99	GK	Serbia	Kristijan Župić (from Proleter Novi Sad)
27	MF	Montenegro	Darko Bošković (from (Bosnia and Herzegovina) Mladost Doboj Kakanj)
30	DF	Serbia	Boris Varga (from Napredak Kruševac)
26	MF	United States	Simon Mršić (from (United States) East Bay FC Stompers)

Out: Note: Flags indicate national team as defined under FIFA eligibility rules; some limited exceptions apply. Players may hold more than one non-FIFA nationality.

No.	Pos.	Nation	Player
25	GK	Serbia	Stefan Čupić (loan return to OFK Beograd)
30	MF	Serbia	Arton Zekaj (loan return to Partizan)
3	DF	Serbia	Miloš Josimov ( (Finland) KPV)
1	GK	Serbia	Miloš Stepandić (to Železničar Lajkovac)
17	FW	Serbia	Nikola Mojsilović (released)
13	DF	Serbia	Goran Smiljanić (to Hajduk Beška)
27	MF	Serbia	Zoran Milovac (to (Switzerland) Pajde Möhlin)
—	MF	Serbia	Zoran Zec (to (Costa Rica) Limón)
8	MF	Serbia	Miroslav Bjeloš (to (Costa Rica) Limón)
33	GK	Serbia	Vladimir Vujasinović (to (Costa Rica) Limón)
20	MF	Serbia	Dane Dukić (to Krila Krajine)
26	DF	Serbia	Božo Jević (to (Austria) Röthis)
—	MF	Serbia	Stefan Kovačević (to Inđija)
11	FW	Bosnia and Herzegovina	Mladen Galić (to OFK Odžaci)
12	GK	Serbia	Nenad Mitrović (on loan to Žarkovo)
—	DF	Serbia	Milivoje Mušikić (on loan to Radnički Šid, previously brought from Jedinstvo Putevi)

=== Borac Čačak ===
In: Note: Flags indicate national team as defined under FIFA eligibility rules; some limited exceptions apply. Players may hold more than one non-FIFA nationality.

No.	Pos.	Nation	Player
17	DF	Serbia	Nikola Ignjatijević (from (Belarus) Shakhtyor Soligorsk)
86	DF	Serbia	Miloš Marković (from Rad)
32	DF	Serbia	Marko Marinković (from BSK Borča)
5	DF	Serbia	Sreten Sretenović (from (Thailand) BEC Tero Sasana)
55	FW	Serbia	Bratislav Punoševac (from Napredak Kruševac)
33	MF	Serbia	Boris Živanović (from (Romania) Dunărea Călărași)
44	DF	Serbia	Dušan Ivanov (from Radnički Niš)
26		South Korea	Park Ji-soo (from (Croatia) Maksimir)
27	MF	Serbia	Nemanja Krstić (from Mačva Šabac)
6	DF	Bosnia and Herzegovina	Nemanja Janičić (from (Uzbekistan) Lokomotiv Tashkent)
—	MF	Bosnia and Herzegovina	Savo Đokić (from Zemun, to youth team)
—	MF	South Korea	Jang Su-min (from (South Korea) Daejeon Citizen)

Out: Note: Flags indicate national team as defined under FIFA eligibility rules; some limited exceptions apply. Players may hold more than one non-FIFA nationality.

No.	Pos.	Nation	Player
28	DF	Serbia	Aleksandar Tanasin (released)
34	FW	Serbia	Srđan Vujaklija (to Red Star Belgrade)
17	DF	Serbia	Mario Maslać (to Vojvodina)
32	MF	Serbia	Vladimir Bogdanović (to (Moldova) Speranța Nisporeni)
6	DF	Serbia	Miloš Krstić (to Kolubara)
—		Serbia	Lazar Vasović (to Polet Ljubić)
22	DF	Serbia	Dušan Đorđević (on loan to Polet Ljubić)
—	GK	Serbia	Marko Drobnjak (on loan to Polet Ljubić, was on loan at Radnički Kragujevac)
—	FW	Serbia	Lazar Jolović (loan extension to Polet Ljubić)
—		Serbia	Luka Mitrović (to Sloboda Čačak)
8	DF	Guinea-Bissau	Bacar Baldé (to (Portugal) Mirandela)
94	FW	Germany	Nikola Ilić (to (North Macedonia) Shkupi)
5	DF	Serbia	Milan Gašić (to Trayal Kruševac, was on loan at Kolubara)
27	DF	Serbia	Ivan Đoković (to Polet Ljubić)

=== Novi Pazar ===
In: Note: Flags indicate national team as defined under FIFA eligibility rules; some limited exceptions apply. Players may hold more than one non-FIFA nationality.

No.	Pos.	Nation	Player
29	FW	Serbia	Nenad Perović (from TSC)
24	DF	Serbia	Srđa Knežević (free, last with (Greece) Agrotikos Asteras)
—	FW	Serbia	Admir Kecap (from (Lithuania) Sūduva)
4	DF	Serbia	Aleksandar Tasić (from (Armenia) Alashkert)
57	MF	Serbia	Miloš Plavšić (from ČSK Čelarevo)
44	MF	Serbia	Luka Sinđić (from Kolubara)
88	MF	Serbia	Miloš Krstić (from Rad)
32	FW	Serbia	Ivan Marković (from (Montenegro) Rudar Pljevlja)
9	FW	Serbia	Mladen Popović (from Inđija)
10	MF	Serbia	Stefan Milojević (from Bežanija)
55	DF	Serbia	Aleksandar Ignjatović (from Radnički Niš)
25	GK	Serbia	Miloš Budaković (from Rad)
30	DF	Serbia	Ibrahim Arifović (from Jošanica)
13	MF	Serbia	Dejan Babić (from Bežanija)
54	DF	Serbia	Milan Savić (from (Cyprus) Anorthosis)
17		Serbia	Mirza Delimeđac (from Jošanica)
—	MF	Serbia	Faruk Bihorac (loan return from Jošanica)

Out: Note: Flags indicate national team as defined under FIFA eligibility rules; some limited exceptions apply. Players may hold more than one non-FIFA nationality.

No.	Pos.	Nation	Player
1	GK	Serbia	Zlatko Zečević (to Mladost Lučani)
30	MF	Serbia	Miloš Lepović (to (Malta) Balzan)
10	MF	Bosnia and Herzegovina	Anid Travančić (to Radnički Niš)
88	MF	North Macedonia	Darko Micevski (to (Belarus) Minsk)
9	FW	Serbia	Anes Rušević (to (Belarus) BATE Borisov)
16	FW	Serbia	Bojan Čečarić (loan return to Mladost Lučani)
7	MF	Serbia	Enver Alivodić (to Napredak Kruševac)
80	MF	Serbia	Milan Svojić (to (Greece) Kalloni)
17	FW	Bosnia and Herzegovina	Petar Kunić (to (Bosnia and Herzegovina) Borac Banja Luka)
32	MF	Serbia	Nikola Dimitrijević (to Rad)
55	GK	Montenegro	Bojan Zogović (to Radnički Niš)
4	DF	Serbia	Darko Stanojević (to (Uzbekistan) Navbahor Namangan)
99	DF	Serbia	Miloš Tintor (to OFK Beograd)
28	MF	Serbia	Ensar Bajramlić (was on loan, now signed with Jošanica)
—	DF	Serbia	Demir Kadrić (to Jošanica)
—	GK	Serbia	Jasmin Koč (loan extension to Jošanica)
3	DF	Serbia	Ermin Ibrahimović (on loan to Jošanica)
44	MF	Uzbekistan	Murod Rajabov (to (Uzbekistan) Olmaliq)
97	GK	Serbia	Pavle Nićiforović (loan extension to Jošanica)

== Serbian First League ==
=== Mačva Šabac ===
In: Note: Flags indicate national team as defined under FIFA eligibility rules; some limited exceptions apply. Players may hold more than one non-FIFA nationality.

No.	Pos.	Nation	Player
14	MF	Serbia	Nemanja Ahčin (from Dinamo Pančevo)
11	MF	Serbia	Stevan Živković (from (Montenegro) Zeta)
30	FW	Serbia	Miodrag Gemović (free, last with Čukarički)
24	MF	Serbia	Nenad Jovanović (from Inđija)
25	GK	Serbia	Dušan Puletić (from Kolubara)
28	DF	Serbia	Marko Rajović (from Budućnost Dobanovci)
23	MF	Serbia	Nemanja Milovanović (from (Belarus) Gorodeya)
—		Serbia	Nenad Bojić (from Radnički SM, to youth team)
21	FW	Serbia	Ognjen Damnjanović (from (Israel) Ramat HaSharon)
—	DF	Serbia	Deni Pavlović (from (Montenegro) Zeta)
4	MF	Bosnia and Herzegovina	Nemanja Matović (from Bežanija)

Out: Note: Flags indicate national team as defined under FIFA eligibility rules; some limited exceptions apply. Players may hold more than one non-FIFA nationality.

No.	Pos.	Nation	Player
30	FW	Serbia	Marko Jošić (to Provo)
28	MF	Serbia	Nemanja Krstić (to Borac Čačak)
5	MF	Serbia	Lazar Ivić (to Radnik Surdulica)
4	DF	Serbia	Bojan Bjedov (to Cement Beočin)
11	FW	Serbia	Marko Memedović (to Radnički Pirot)
12	GK	Serbia	Janko Langura (to Dinamo Vranje)
10	MF	Serbia	Stefan Milosavljević (to Zemun)
14	FW	Serbia	Aleksandar Đukić (released)
—		Serbia	Dušan Nikolić (loan extension to Provo)
—		Serbia	Nikola Vasić (loan extension to Provo)
88	GK	Serbia	Miloš Savić (loan extension to Dunav Prahovo)
16	MF	Serbia	Stefan Đurković (was on loan, now signed with Provo)
24	MF	North Macedonia	Perica Stančeski (to Lokomotiva Beograd)
23	DF	Serbia	Dejan Blagojević (to BSK Borča)
—	DF	Serbia	Vladimir Lukić (was on loan, now signed with Mačva Bogatić)
13	MF	Serbia	Đorđe Simić (to Osečina)
—		Serbia	Miloš Radovanović (on loan to Jevremovac)
—		Serbia	Dejan Zrnić (loan extension to Radnički Šabački)
27	MF	Serbia	Aleksandar Vujković (to Budućnost Dobrić)

=== Sloboda Užice ===
In: Note: Flags indicate national team as defined under FIFA eligibility rules; some limited exceptions apply. Players may hold more than one non-FIFA nationality.

No.	Pos.	Nation	Player
15	MF	Montenegro	Boris Došljak (from (Montenegro) Lovćen)
12	GK	Serbia	Uroš Đurić (from Sopot)
21	DF	Serbia	Rade Glišović (from (Montenegro) Rudar Pljevlja)
99	FW	Montenegro	Balša Peličić (from Bežanija)
88	MF	Serbia	Branislav Stanić (from Kolubara)
17	MF	Serbia	Nenad Cvetković (from Zlatibor Čajetina)
14	MF	Serbia	Luka Slavković (from Takovo)
13	MF	Serbia	Sreten Atanasković (from Dolina Padina)

Out: Note: Flags indicate national team as defined under FIFA eligibility rules; some limited exceptions apply. Players may hold more than one non-FIFA nationality.

No.	Pos.	Nation	Player
13	MF	Serbia	Nemanja Živković (loan return to Javor Ivanjica)
—	DF	North Macedonia	Nikola Stojanov (loan return to Javor Ivanjica)
99	MF	Serbia	Stefan Vukmirović (to (Malaysia) Kuantan FA)
15	MF	Serbia	Milan Milanović (to Javor Ivanjica)
12	GK	Serbia	Dalibor Divac (to Zlatibor Čajetina)
2	DF	Serbia	Marko Marjanović (to Zlatibor Čajetina)
25	GK	Serbia	Luka Radojičić (on loan to Zlatibor Čajetina, was on loan at Sloga BB)
5	DF	Serbia	Aleksandar Petrović (to Srem Jakovo)
6	MF	Serbia	Aleksandar Mitrović (on loan to Zlatibor Čajetina)
—	MF	Serbia	Igor Vučićević (on loan to Zlatibor Čajetina)
22	MF	Serbia	Mirko Petrović (to Sevojno)
3	DF	Serbia	Nikola Vučković (on loan to Jedinstvo Putevi)
9	DF	Serbia	Momčilo Rudan (to Bratstvo Prigrevica)
20	MF	Montenegro	Bojan Bigović (to (Montenegro) Igalo)
21	FW	Serbia	Neven Radaković (released)

=== Radnički Pirot ===
In: Note: Flags indicate national team as defined under FIFA eligibility rules; some limited exceptions apply. Players may hold more than one non-FIFA nationality.

No.	Pos.	Nation	Player
—	GK	Serbia	Milan Filipović (loan return from Jedinstvo Pirot)
—	DF	Serbia	Marko Davidović (loan return from Jedinstvo Pirot)
—	FW	Serbia	Uroš Đurić (loan return from Car Konstantin)
—		Serbia	Miloš Milojević (loan return from Jedinstvo Pirot)
—		Serbia	Filip Đorđev (loan return from Jedinstvo Pirot)
—		Serbia	Nikola Ilić (loan return from Jedinstvo Pirot)
—		Serbia	Veljko Ćirić (loan return from Lužnica)
—		Serbia	Mladen Veljković (loan return from Lužnica)
—		Serbia	Jovan Živković (loan return from Lužnica)
—	DF	Serbia	Stefan Ćirić (from Radan Lebane)
—	GK	Serbia	Vojislav Ilić (from Radan Lebane)
—	MF	Serbia	Davor Petrov (from Radan Lebane)
—	MF	Serbia	Lazar Čordašić (from OFK Odžaci)
—	MF	Serbia	Marko Memedović (from Mačva Šabac)
—	DF	Serbia	Miljan Bućković (from Radnički Beograd)

Out: Note: Flags indicate national team as defined under FIFA eligibility rules; some limited exceptions apply. Players may hold more than one non-FIFA nationality.

No.	Pos.	Nation	Player
17	DF	Serbia	Miloš Perišić (loan return to Partizan)
12	GK	Serbia	Ivan Kostić (to Metalac G. M.)
2	DF	Serbia	Stefan Jovanović (to Zemun)
8	MF	Serbia	Miloš Ožegović (to (Iceland) Vikingur Reykjavik)
18	FW	Serbia	Stefan Stojanović (to Radnički Svilajnac)
16	MF	Serbia	Stefan Čolović (to Kolubara)
14	MF	Serbia	Ivan Milić (to Radnički Svilajnac)
—		Serbia	Nikola Manić (on loan to Lužnica)
—		Serbia	Nikola Ćirić (on loan to Jedinstvo Pirot, was on loan at Lužnica)
—	DF	Serbia	Branislav Pešić (loan extension to Jedinstvo Pirot)
—	MF	Serbia	Stefan Todorović (on loan to Jedinstvo Pirot, was on loan at Lužnica)
—		Serbia	Lazar Filipović (loan extension to Jedinstvo Pirot)
—	GK	Serbia	Boris Dimitrov (loan extension to Balkanski)
—		Serbia	Nikola Rančić (loan extension to Lužnica)
—		Serbia	Miloš Milojković (on loan to Jedinstvo Pirot)
—		Serbia	Željko Stamenković (loan extension to Jedinstvo Pirot)
—		Serbia	Lazar Branković (on loan to Jedinstvo Pirot)
—	GK	Serbia	Igor Nešić (on loan to Jedinstvo Pirot, previously brought from Srem Jakovo)
—		Serbia	Aleksa Pavlović (on loan to Tanasko Rajić)

=== ČSK Čelarevo ===
In: Note: Flags indicate national team as defined under FIFA eligibility rules; some limited exceptions apply. Players may hold more than one non-FIFA nationality.

No.	Pos.	Nation	Player
—	DF	Serbia	Milan Medić (loan return from Budućnost Gložan)
—		Serbia	Aleksandar Alimpić (loan return from Šajkaš Kovilj)
—	DF	Serbia	Nikola Anđelković (from Radan Lebane)
—	MF	Bosnia and Herzegovina	Zoran Vuković (from Bačka 1901)
—	MF	Serbia	Nemanja Nikić (from Bačka 1901)
—	MF	Serbia	Nikola Trifković (from Cement Beočin)
—	FW	Serbia	Bogdan Tepić (from Cement Beočin)
—	MF	Serbia	Aleksandar Desančić (free, last with Proleter Novi Sad)
—	MF	Serbia	Uroš Galijaš (from Radnički Beograd)
—	MF	Serbia	Zoran Rakić (from Crvena Zvezda NS)
—	FW	Serbia	Luka Rudan (from Bežanija)
—	DF	Serbia	Ivan Vasiljević (from Lokomotiva Beograd)
—	GK	Serbia	Damjan Knežević (from Brodarac)
—	DF	Serbia	Miloš Zečević (from Polet Nakovo)
—	MF	Serbia	Marko Tadić (from Mladost Bački Jarak)
—	DF	Montenegro	Milko Novaković (free, last with Vojvodina)
—	FW	Serbia	Georgije Ilić (on loan from Rad)
—	MF	Australia	Yiannis Nestoras (from (Australia) West Adelaide)
—	FW	Zimbabwe	Tendai Chitiza (from (England) Gresley)
—	DF	Serbia	Srđan Bečelić (from (Bosnia and Herzegovina) Borac Banja Luka)
—	MF	Bosnia and Herzegovina	Miloš Đurđić (from (Bosnia and Herzegovina) Sloga Srbac)

Out: Note: Flags indicate national team as defined under FIFA eligibility rules; some limited exceptions apply. Players may hold more than one non-FIFA nationality.

No.	Pos.	Nation	Player
—	FW	Serbia	Aleksandar Crnojački (loan return to Spartak Subotica)
26	FW	Montenegro	Mladen Vukasović (to Radnik Surdulica)
12	MF	Serbia	Nikola Žakula (to Radnik Surdulica)
7	MF	Serbia	Miloš Plavšić (to Novi Pazar)
8	MF	Serbia	Danijel Zlatković (loan return to Spartak Subotica)
18	DF	Serbia	Dimitrije Tomović (loan return to Spartak Subotica)
11	FW	Serbia	Milan Đokić (loan return to Spartak Subotica)
9	FW	Serbia	Slađan Nikodijević (to Inđija)
4	DF	Serbia	Nemanja Marković (to Inđija)
—	GK	Serbia	Ivan Nemet (to Teleoptik, was on loan at Tekstilac Odžaci)
40	FW	Serbia	Nikola Furtula (to BSK Borča)
—	MF	Serbia	Dejan Stojaković (to Cement Beočin)
15	MF	Serbia	Slobodan Krstanović (to Inđija)
—	MF	Serbia	Pavle Šljivančanin (to Proleter Novi Sad)
1	GK	Montenegro	Boris Božović (to Brodarac 1947)
16	MF	Serbia	Marko Kostić (to Jedinstvo Paraćin)
—	FW	Serbia	Srđan Matić (to Cement Beočin, was on loan at Crvena Zvezda NS)
—		Serbia	Branislav Tucakov (on loan to Sloga Temerin, was on loan at Budućnost Gložan)
—	MF	Serbia	Marko Ris (loan extension to Crvena Zvezda NS)
—	DF	Serbia	Filip Radović (on loan to Crvena Zvezda NS, was on loan at Dunav Stari Banovci)
—		Serbia	Strahinja Ilić (loan extension to Budućnost Gložan)
—		Serbia	Jovan Dokić (on loan to Budućnost Gložan)
—		Serbia	Ognjen Dučić (on loan to Borac Sakule, previously brought from the same club)
—		Serbia	Srđan Mirković (on loan to Mladost Kruščić, was on loan at Naša Zvezda)
—	DF	Serbia	Josip Hadrava (to Krila Krajine, was on loan at Hercegovac Gajdobra)

=== Proleter Novi Sad ===
In: Note: Flags indicate national team as defined under FIFA eligibility rules; some limited exceptions apply. Players may hold more than one non-FIFA nationality.

No.	Pos.	Nation	Player
21	MF	Serbia	Srđan Šćepanović (on loan from Vojvodina)
1	GK	Serbia	Marko Ilić (on loan from Vojvodina)
20	MF	Serbia	Marko Đurišić (loan extension from Vojvodina)
—		Serbia	Igor Janković (from Veternik, to youth team)
18	MF	Serbia	Pavle Šljivančanin (from ČSK Čelarevo)
14	MF	Serbia	Zoran Karać (from Sloga Temerin)
15	DF	Serbia	Bojan Šalipur (from Železničar Lajkovac)
6	MF	China	Zhong Haoran (from Spartak Subotica)
2	DF	Serbia	Milan Lazarević (loan extension from Vojvodina)
16	MF	Montenegro	Nemanja Bošković (from (Bosnia and Herzegovina) Slavija Sarajevo)
10	MF	Serbia	Slobodan Novaković (from (Switzerland) BSC Old Boys)

Out: Note: Flags indicate national team as defined under FIFA eligibility rules; some limited exceptions apply. Players may hold more than one non-FIFA nationality.

No.	Pos.	Nation	Player
3	DF	Serbia	David Hrubik (loan return to Vojvodina)
14	FW	Serbia	Uroš Stamenić (loan return to Vojvodina)
21	DF	Serbia	Boris Milekić (to (Poland) Stal Mielec)
20	MF	Serbia	Petar Ilić (to Inđija)
—	FW	Ghana	Bismarck Appiah (to Bačka BP)
—	GK	Serbia	Kristijan Župić (to Bačka BP)
5	DF	Serbia	Filip Babić (to Vojvodina)
1	GK	Serbia	Emil Rockov (to Vojvodina)
15	MF	Bosnia and Herzegovina	Darko Jović (to Vojvodina)
—	FW	Serbia	David Stojisavljević (on loan to Sloga Temerin, previously brought from Cement Beočin)
—	MF	Serbia	Nikola Bogdanić (to Crvena Zvezda NS, was on loan at Sloga Temerin)
—	DF	Serbia	Nemanja Kojčić (was on loan, now signed with Crvena Zvezda NS)
—		Serbia	Svetislav Šoronja (to Železničar Novi Sad)
—	DF	Serbia	Dejan Zeljković (on loan to Veternik, previously brought from Vojvodina)
—		Serbia	Luka Kosmajac (on loan to Srbobran)
—		Serbia	Miloš Ubović (loan extension to Srbobran)
—	MF	Serbia	Filip Đorđević (to OFK Odžaci)
—	GK	Serbia	Goran Ćurko (to Srbobran)

=== Zemun ===
In: Note: Flags indicate national team as defined under FIFA eligibility rules; some limited exceptions apply. Players may hold more than one non-FIFA nationality.

No.	Pos.	Nation	Player
—	MF	Serbia	Nenad Lukić (was on loan, now signed from Radnik Surdulica)
—	GK	Serbia	Miloš Krunić (loan return from Rakovica)
—	MF	Serbia	Jovan Jevtić (loan return from Rakovica)
—	MF	Serbia	Nemanja Grujić (from Sloga Temerin)
—	MF	Serbia	Stefan Milosavljević (from Mačva Šabac)
—	DF	Serbia	Stefan Jovanović (from Radnički Pirot)
—	DF	Bosnia and Herzegovina	Slaviša Radović (from Voždovac)
—	GK	Serbia	Srđan Ostojić (from (Kazakhstan) Akzhayik)
—	MF	Serbia	Risto Ristović (from (Tajikistan) Istiklol)
—	DF	Serbia	Marko Đalović (from (Kazakhstan) Zhetysu)
—	FW	Serbia	Lazar Đurović (from Čukarički)
—	MF	Serbia	Miloš Čudić (from Žarkovo)
—		Serbia	Stefan Stašić (from Sopot)
—	FW	Georgia	Davit Volkovi (from (Georgia (country)) Dinamo Tbilisi)
—	DF	Serbia	Aleksandar Miodragović (loan return from Radnički Beograd)
—	FW	Serbia	Mladen Mrakić (from OFK Beograd)

Out: Note: Flags indicate national team as defined under FIFA eligibility rules; some limited exceptions apply. Players may hold more than one non-FIFA nationality.

No.	Pos.	Nation	Player
—	MF	Montenegro	Srđan Ajković (to (Montenegro) Grbalj)
—	MF	Serbia	Đorđe Ivelja (to (Bulgaria) Montana)
—	DF	Serbia	Nikola Pejović (on loan to (Italy) Empoli, previously brought from Red Star Belgrade)
—	DF	Serbia	Stefan Todorović (to Trayal Kruševac, was on loan at Dunav Stari Banovci)
—	MF	Bosnia and Herzegovina	Savo Đokić (to Borac Čačak)
—	GK	Serbia	Bojan Jović (to Spartak Subotica)
—	FW	Montenegro	Stefan Denković (to (Montenegro) Bokelj)
—	DF	Serbia	Stefan Radovanović (to (Montenegro) OFK Petrovac)
—	FW	Serbia	Anto Vasović (to Torlak)
—		Serbia	Bojan Dizdarević (to Inđija, was on loan at Milutinac)
—	DF	Serbia	Nemanja Zlatković (to (Bosnia and Herzegovina) Radnik Bijeljina)
—	DF	Serbia	Vladimir Branković (to TSC)
—	FW	Serbia	Vuk Sotirović (to Grafičar Beograd)
—	FW	Canada	Aleksa Marković (on loan to Brodarac 1947, was on loan at Radnički Beograd)
—	FW	Serbia	Nenad Injac (to (Armenia) Banants)
—	MF	Serbia	Mihajlo Cakić (to Sinđelić Beograd)
—		Serbia	Senad Šabanaj (to Lokomotiva Beograd, was on loan at Milutinac)
—	FW	Serbia	Dejan Đorđević (released, previously brought from (Malta) Birkirkara)

=== Budućnost Dobanovci ===
In: Note: Flags indicate national team as defined under FIFA eligibility rules; some limited exceptions apply. Players may hold more than one non-FIFA nationality.

No.	Pos.	Nation	Player
—	MF	Serbia	Petar Jeličić (from Radnički Beograd)
—	MF	Serbia	Vuk Ranđić (from Omladinac Novi Banovci)
—	DF	Serbia	Stevan Radulović (from Sinđelić Beograd)
—	MF	Serbia	Nikola Divac (was on loan, now signed from Bežanija)
—		Serbia	Marko Perišić (from Voždovac)
—	MF	Canada	Steve Knezevic (from (Canada) Brantford Galaxy)

Out: Note: Flags indicate national team as defined under FIFA eligibility rules; some limited exceptions apply. Players may hold more than one non-FIFA nationality.

No.	Pos.	Nation	Player
—	MF	Serbia	Nikola Divac (loan return to Bežanija)
—		Serbia	Miloš Stojčević (to Jedinstvo Štitar)
—	DF	Serbia	Marko Rajović (to Mačva Šabac)
—	FW	Bosnia and Herzegovina	Budimir Šarčević (loan return to Čukarički)
—	MF	Serbia	Bojan Miletić (to Radnički Beograd)
—	FW	Serbia	Milan Šušnjar (to Borac Sakule)
—	DF	Serbia	Miloš Tanović (on loan to Radnički NP)
—	MF	Serbia	Stefan Krkobabić (on loan to Radnički NP, previously brought from the same club)
—	MF	Switzerland	Svetlan Kosić (to (Slovenia) Krško)

=== Inđija ===
In: Note: Flags indicate national team as defined under FIFA eligibility rules; some limited exceptions apply. Players may hold more than one non-FIFA nationality.

No.	Pos.	Nation	Player
22	FW	Serbia	Darko Lemajić (was on loan, now signed from Napredak Kruševac)
9	FW	Serbia	Slađan Nikodijević (from ČSK Čelarevo)
3	DF	Serbia	Nemanja Marković (from ČSK Čelarevo)
20	MF	Serbia	Stefan Kovačević (from Bačka BP)
15	MF	Serbia	Slobodan Krstanović (from ČSK Čelarevo)
19	MF	Serbia	Slavoljub Đokić (from Lokomotiva Beograd)
16	MF	Serbia	Marko Bičkeji (from Cement Beočin)
7	FW	Serbia	Petar Ilić (from Proleter Novi Sad)
21	DF	Serbia	Damjan Todorović (from Cement Beočin)
—	MF	Serbia	Peđa Zvekan (from Kabel Novi Sad, to youth team)
—	DF	Serbia	Nikola Đurić (from Veternik, to youth team)
—		Serbia	Dušan Isailović (from Veternik, to youth team)
—		Serbia	Bojan Gardinovački (from Veternik, to youth team)
—		Serbia	Bojan Dizdarević (from Zemun, to youth team)

Out: Note: Flags indicate national team as defined under FIFA eligibility rules; some limited exceptions apply. Players may hold more than one non-FIFA nationality.

No.	Pos.	Nation	Player
9	FW	Serbia	Mladen Popović (to Novi Pazar)
7	MF	Serbia	Nenad Jovanović (to Mačva Šabac)
—	FW	Serbia	Miloš Savanović (on loan to Radnički Zrenjanin, was on loan at Sloga Temerin)
19	FW	Serbia	Aleksandar Rakić (to (Maldives) Maziya S&RC)
21	MF	Serbia	Branimir Kostić (to Jedinstvo SP)
20	MF	Serbia	Dušan Ivković (to Jedinstvo SP)
3	DF	Serbia	Rade Pejić (to Jedinstvo SP)
—	GK	Serbia	Miloš Milinović (to Hajduk Beška)
—	FW	Ghana	Yaw Antwi (to (Ghana) Berekum Chelsea)
14	FW	Serbia	Miloš Živanović (to Dinamo Vranje)
22	FW	Serbia	Zoran Komazec (to Žarkovo)
16	MF	Serbia	Aleksa Plećaš (to Krušedol)
—	FW	Serbia	Danilo Marković (to Železničar Inđija)
—		Serbia	Radomir Milenković (to Radnički NP)
—		Serbia	Stevan Radanović (to Jedinstvo SP)
—		Serbia	Aleksandar Bajić (to Jedinstvo SP)

=== Sinđelić Beograd ===
In: Note: Flags indicate national team as defined under FIFA eligibility rules; some limited exceptions apply. Players may hold more than one non-FIFA nationality.

No.	Pos.	Nation	Player
—	GK	Serbia	Miroslav Grujičić (from Dinamo Vranje)
—	MF	Serbia	Emil Hasanagić (from Vršac)
—	FW	Serbia	Milorad Dabić (on loan from Rad)
—	DF	Serbia	Ivan Kričak (on loan from Rad)
—	MF	Serbia	Lazar Tufegdžić (from Red Star Belgrade)
—	MF	Serbia	Nikola Jovanović (from Red Star Belgrade)
—	MF	Serbia	Mihajlo Cakić (from Zemun)
—	FW	Serbia	Saša Varga (from Bežanija)

Out: Note: Flags indicate national team as defined under FIFA eligibility rules; some limited exceptions apply. Players may hold more than one non-FIFA nationality.

No.	Pos.	Nation	Player
—	DF	Germany	Stefan Kukoljac (loan return to Voždovac)
—	GK	Serbia	Dušan Čubraković (loan return to Čukarički)
—	GK	Montenegro	Nemanja Šćekić (to (Bulgaria) Montana)
—	DF	Montenegro	Marko Vidović (to Bačka BP)
—	MF	Serbia	Nikola Milovanović (to Siti Sport Klub)
—	FW	Serbia	Pavle Radunović (to OFK Beograd)
—	MF	Serbia	Nikola Stojanović (to OFK Beograd)
—	MF	Montenegro	Tigran Goranović (to Grafičar Beograd)
—	MF	Serbia	Miodrag Milenković (to Radnički Beograd)
—	GK	Serbia	Jovan Bubonja (to Sparta Železnik)
—	MF	Serbia	Nikola Eregić (to Prva Petoletka)
—	DF	Serbia	Stevan Radulović (to Budućnost Dobanovci)
—	FW	Serbia	Nenad Živković (released)

=== Bežanija ===
In: Note: Flags indicate national team as defined under FIFA eligibility rules; some limited exceptions apply. Players may hold more than one non-FIFA nationality.

No.	Pos.	Nation	Player
7	MF	Serbia	Igor Krmar (loan return from (Canada) Hamilton City)
10	FW	Serbia	Nikola Lekić (from Dorćol)
11	FW	Serbia	Marko Jeremić (from IMT)
6	DF	Serbia	Stefan Filipović (from IMT)
—	MF	Serbia	Đorđe Radovanović (from Dinamo Vranje)
—	DF	Serbia	Andrija Mijailović (from Kolubara)
19	MF	Serbia	Andrej Mrkela (from Spartak Subotica)
4	DF	Serbia	Uroš Stojanović (from Žarkovo)
14	DF	Serbia	Petar Aničić (from Žarkovo)
—	GK	Serbia	Zdravko Marić (from Žarkovo)
1	GK	Serbia	Jovan Vićić (on loan from Red Star Belgrade)
16	FW	Serbia	Milan Panović (on loan from Red Star Belgrade)
8	MF	Bosnia and Herzegovina	Vanja Zekić (from (Bosnia and Herzegovina) Drina Zvornik)

Out: Note: Flags indicate national team as defined under FIFA eligibility rules; some limited exceptions apply. Players may hold more than one non-FIFA nationality.

No.	Pos.	Nation	Player
—	FW	Serbia	Luka Rudan (to ČSK Čelarevo)
17	MF	Serbia	Dejan Babić (to Novi Pazar)
6	MF	Serbia	Nikola Jovanović (loan return to Red Star Belgrade)
—	FW	Montenegro	Balša Peličić (to Sloboda Užice)
20	DF	Montenegro	Igor Zonjić (to (Montenegro) Sutjeska Nikšić)
8	MF	Serbia	Stanoje Jovanović (to (Bosnia and Herzegovina) Metalleghe-BSI)
16	MF	Serbia	Marko Vučetić (to (North Macedonia) Bregalnica Štip)
70	GK	Serbia	Marko Lazarević (to Rad)
—	DF	Serbia	Nikola Todorović (was on loan, now signed with Loznica)
7	MF	Serbia	Stefan Milojević (to Novi Pazar)
14	FW	Serbia	Milan Perić (to TSC)
9	FW	Bosnia and Herzegovina	Marko Mitrušić (to Sopot)
10	DF	Serbia	Draško Đorđević (to Red Star Belgrade)
12	GK	Canada	Jovan Lučić (to Radnički Beograd)
13	DF	Serbia	Milenko Škorić (to Radnički Beograd)
—	GK	Serbia	Andreja Radosavljević (to Jadran Golubinci, was on loan at Crvena Zvezda MML)
—	FW	Serbia	Ljubomir Delić (to Prva Iskra)
11	MF	Serbia	Nenad Simić (to Jedinstvo Paraćin)
—	FW	Serbia	Saša Varga (to Sinđelić Beograd)
—	MF	Serbia	Nikola Divac (was on loan, now signed with Budućnost Dobanovci)
19	MF	Bosnia and Herzegovina	Nemanja Matović (to Mačva Šabac)

=== BSK Borča ===
In: Note: Flags indicate national team as defined under FIFA eligibility rules; some limited exceptions apply. Players may hold more than one non-FIFA nationality.

No.	Pos.	Nation	Player
—	MF	North Macedonia	Muhamet Ajvazi (free, last with (North Macedonia) Teteks)
—	MF	Serbia	Matija Drašković (from Grafičar Beograd)
—	DF	Serbia	Jovan Marinković (from Sinđelić Niš)
—	MF	Serbia	Dušan Petronijević (from Jagodina)
—	FW	Serbia	Nikola Popović (from Dinamo Vranje)
—	FW	Serbia	Miloš Đorđević (from Dinamo Vranje)
—	FW	Serbia	Marko Basara (from Žarkovo)
—	DF	Serbia	Dejan Blagojević (from Mačva Šabac)
—	DF	Serbia	Miloš Kostadinović (from GSP Polet)
—	FW	Serbia	Nikola Furtula (from ČSK Čelarevo)
—	MF	Serbia	Marko Cvijakić (from Torlak)
—	FW	Serbia	Ivan Tapušković (from OFK Beograd)
—	MF	Serbia	Stefan Janković (from OFK Beograd)
—	MF	Serbia	Jordan Jovanović (on loan from Javor Ivanjica)
—	MF	Serbia	Zoran Marušić (from (Bosnia and Herzegovina) Krupa)

Out: Note: Flags indicate national team as defined under FIFA eligibility rules; some limited exceptions apply. Players may hold more than one non-FIFA nationality.

No.	Pos.	Nation	Player
9	FW	Serbia	Stefan D. Tripković (to Javor Ivanjica)
5	DF	Serbia	Marko Marinković (to Borac Čačak)
14	FW	Serbia	Miloš Džugurdić (to (Bosnia and Herzegovina) Olimpik Sarajevo)
7	MF	Serbia	Luka Janković (to Dinamo Pančevo)
8	MF	Serbia	Danko Kiković (to Javor Ivanjica)
2	DF	Serbia	Zlatko Iličić (to OFK Beograd)
—	FW	Serbia	Dušan Vujadinović (to BASK)
16	FW	Bosnia and Herzegovina	Miloš Bajić (to Radnički Beograd)
—		Serbia	Miloš Đurović (to Lepušnica, was on loan at Borac Sakule)
—		Serbia	Vladimir Erčić (to PKB Padinska Skela, was on loan at Borac Sakule)
13	DF	Serbia	Nikola Todorić (to Dinamo Pančevo)
6	MF	Serbia	Dušan Plavšić (to Kolubara)
—	FW	Serbia	Vojkan Sarajlin (to Radnički Zrenjanin)
—	MF	Serbia	Dimitrije Pobulić (to OFK Odžaci)
—	DF	Montenegro	Vasilije Radenović (to (Montenegro) Lovćen)
—	MF	China	Zhu Zhengyu (loan return to (China) Shanghai SIPG)
—	MF	Serbia	Stefan S. Tripković (to (Bosnia and Herzegovina) Zvijezda 09)

=== Dinamo Vranje ===
In: Note: Flags indicate national team as defined under FIFA eligibility rules; some limited exceptions apply. Players may hold more than one non-FIFA nationality.

No.	Pos.	Nation	Player
23	FW	Serbia	Miloš Antić (from (Germany) FC Speyer 09)
26	MF	Serbia	Zoran Šćepanović (from Osečina)
—	FW	Serbia	Davor Nedeljković (from Pčinja)
9	FW	Serbia	Andrija Majdevac (on loan from Napredak Kruševac)
27	DF	Serbia	Predrag Radojević (from BASK)
19	FW	Serbia	Bojan Spasojević (from Vodojaža)
—	MF	Serbia	Uroš Krunić (free, last with Sloga Kraljevo)
11	FW	Serbia	Miloš Živanović (from Inđija)
1	GK	Serbia	Janko Langura (from Mačva Šabac)
14	DF	Montenegro	Lazar Đokić (from Spartak Subotica)
30	DF	Serbia	Nemanja Ljubisavljević (on loan from Radnički Niš)
5	DF	Serbia	Dušan Stevanović (from (Montenegro) Lovćen)
18	MF	Serbia	Dušan Mladenović (from (North Macedonia) Sileks)

Out: Note: Flags indicate national team as defined under FIFA eligibility rules; some limited exceptions apply. Players may hold more than one non-FIFA nationality.

No.	Pos.	Nation	Player
23	FW	Serbia	Nikola Popović (to BSK Borča)
10	FW	Serbia	Milan Stavrić (to Bačka BP)
1	GK	Serbia	Miroslav Grujičić (to Sinđelić Beograd)
—	MF	Serbia	Aleksandar Stoimirović (released)
11	MF	Serbia	Đorđe Radovanović (to Bežanija)
9	FW	Serbia	Miloš Đorđević (to BSK Borča)
13	FW	Serbia	Nikola Z. Arsić (to Grafičar Beograd)
—	FW	Serbia	Zoran Vujović (to Crvena Zvezda MML)
—	GK	Serbia	Miodrag Mladenović (was on loan, now signed with Vlasina)
—	MF	Serbia	Aleksandar Jović (on loan to Vlasina)
18	MF	Serbia	Petar Veličković (on loan to Vlasina)
—	GK	Serbia	Radomir Petrović (released)
5	DF	Serbia	Aleksandar Simov (to Sinđelić Niš)
26	FW	Serbia	Marjan Petrović (to Morava Vladičin Han)
—	FW	Serbia	Lazar Vučeljić (released)
—	DF	Serbia	Miljan Stojanović (on loan to Pusta Reka, was on loan at Radan Lebane)
14	DF	Serbia	Jovan Zucović (released)
20	DF	North Macedonia	Nikola Stojanović (to KMF BSK Bujanovac)
—	MF	Belarus	Ilya Tyunis (to (Lithuania) Pakruojis)

=== Jagodina ===
In: Note: Flags indicate national team as defined under FIFA eligibility rules; some limited exceptions apply. Players may hold more than one non-FIFA nationality.

No.	Pos.	Nation	Player
—		Serbia	Predrag Blagojević (from Radnički Svilajnac, to youth team)
—		Serbia	Tadija Dimić (from Radnički Svilajnac, to youth team)
—		Serbia	Marko Manojlović (from Morava Ćuprija, to youth team)
—		Serbia	Aleksa Radenković (from Hajduk Veljko, to youth team)
99	MF	Serbia	Marko Radosavljević (loan return from Tabane Trgovački)
5	DF	Serbia	Đorđe Petrović (loan return from Tabane Trgovački)
18	MF	Nigeria	Nnaemeka Ajuru (from Spartak Subotica)
21	FW	Serbia	Igor Dimitrijević (from Tabane Trgovački)
32	MF	Serbia	Nikola Vlajković (from Tabane Trgovački)
44	GK	Serbia	Stefan Stojanović (from Napredak Kruševac)
50	DF	Serbia	Marko Mirkailo (loan return from Tabane Trgovački)
2	DF	Serbia	Duško Dukić (from (Albania) Korabi Peshkopi)
26	DF	Montenegro	Momčilo Dulović (from (Montenegro) Jedinstvo Bijelo Polje)
20	MF	Montenegro	Marko Ilinčić (from (Montenegro) Grbalj)
17	FW	Serbia	Miroslav Lečić (from (Kazakhstan) Akzhayik)
—	MF	Japan	Gentaro Murakami (from (Romania) Șoimii Pâncota)
—	FW	China	Pan Qi (from (Portugal) Aves)
30	MF	Brazil	Hegon (from (Brazil) Camboriú)
35	MF	Serbia	Ivan Marić (from (Slovakia) Lokomotíva Zvolen)

Out: Note: Flags indicate national team as defined under FIFA eligibility rules; some limited exceptions apply. Players may hold more than one non-FIFA nationality.

No.	Pos.	Nation	Player
—	GK	Serbia	Aleksa Dodić (released)
2	DF	Serbia	Predrag Đorđević (to OFK Beograd)
18	MF	Serbia	Dušan Petronijević (to BSK Borča)
33	DF	Serbia	Nikola Vučetić (released)
31	MF	Serbia	Nemanja Đekić (to Karađorđe Topola)
26	MF	Serbia	Igor Jelić (to (Uzbekistan) Olmaliq)
—	FW	Serbia	Miloš Živanović (on loan to Sloga Despotovac)
—	MF	Serbia	Zoran Knežević (to Budućnost Krušik, was on loan at (Indonesia) Bali United)
—	GK	Serbia	Lazar Jevremović (on loan to Sloga Despotovac)
—	DF	Australia	Marko Milutinović (on loan to Tabane Trgovački, previously brought from the same club)
—	FW	Serbia	Luka Milisavljević (on loan to Tabane Trgovački)
—	MF	Serbia	Željko Sofronijević (on loan to Tabane Trgovački)
44	GK	Serbia	Stefan Vasić (loan extension to Tabane Trgovački)
—	MF	Serbia	Đorđe Ivljanin (on loan to Tabane Trgovački, previously brought from the same club)
91	FW	Serbia	Vladimir Petrović (loan extension to Tabane Trgovački)
—	DF	Serbia	Boban Dobrosavljević (on loan to Kolare, was on loan at Rembas)
32	FW	Serbia	Miodrag Maljković (to Vojvodina)
—	MF	Serbia	Bora Đurić (to Jedinstvo Mijatovac, was on loan at Morava Ribare)
—	DF	Serbia	Nemanja Ljubisavljević (to Radnički Niš, was on loan at Tabane Trgovački)
5	DF	Serbia	Vukašin Tomić (to (Kazakhstan) Atyrau)
—	DF	Serbia	Marko Živić (to (Slovakia) Fiľakovo, was on loan at Tabane Trgovački)
20	DF	Serbia	Slađan Mijatović (to Jedinstvo Paraćin)
36	MF	Serbia	Stefan Nedović (to Šumadija 1903)

=== Kolubara ===
In: Note: Flags indicate national team as defined under FIFA eligibility rules; some limited exceptions apply. Players may hold more than one non-FIFA nationality.

No.	Pos.	Nation	Player
17	MF	Serbia	Nikola Petković (loan return from Turbina Vreoci)
5	FW	Serbia	Nemanja Obrenović (loan return from Brodarac 1947)
25	MF	Serbia	Mladen Lukić (from Brodarac 1947)
18	FW	Serbia	Luka Lemić (from Brodarac 1947)
24	FW	Serbia	Aleksandar Stevanović (from Stepojevac Vaga)
8	MF	Serbia	Dušan Plavšić (from BSK Borča)
15	DF	Serbia	Miloš Krstić (from Borac Čačak)
1	GK	Serbia	Dragan Rosić (on loan from Mladost Lučani)
12	GK	Serbia	Marko Trkulja (from Red Star Belgrade)
23	GK	Serbia	Stefan Đorđević (from (Greece) Kozani)
16	MF	Serbia	Stefan Čolović (from Radnički Pirot)
—		Serbia	Darko Matić (from Železničar Lajkovac, to youth team)
—		Serbia	Nikola Fogl (from Turbina Vreoci, to youth team)
—		Serbia	Veljko Popović (from Turbina Vreoci, to youth team)

Out: Note: Flags indicate national team as defined under FIFA eligibility rules; some limited exceptions apply. Players may hold more than one non-FIFA nationality.

No.	Pos.	Nation	Player
19	DF	Serbia	Milan Gašić (loan return to Borac Čačak)
16	FW	Serbia	Aleksandar Dimitrić (loan return to Javor Ivanjica)
17	MF	Serbia	Luka Sinđić (to Novi Pazar)
24	DF	Serbia	Veljko Dimitrijević (to Turbina Vreoci)
14	MF	Serbia	Vladan Spasojević (to TEK Sloga)
12	GK	Serbia	Dušan Puletić (to Mačva Šabac)
18	MF	Serbia	Branislav Stanić (to Sloboda Užice)
10	MF	Serbia	Uroš Stepanović (to Bačka BP)
17		Serbia	Nikola Pranić (to TEK Sloga, was on loan at Ribnica Mionica)
—	FW	Serbia	Vuk Lazić (on loan to Železničar Lajkovac, was on loan at TEK Sloga)
—	DF	Serbia	Andrija Mijailović (to Bežanija)
16	DF	Serbia	Marko Mazić (loan extension Turbina Vreoci)
—		Serbia	Nikola Nedić (on loan to Turbina Vreoci)
—	MF	Serbia	Strahinja Bosanac (on loan to Brodarac 1947, previously brought from OFK Beograd)
14	FW	Serbia	Marko Simić (loan return to Mladost Lučani)
23	DF	Serbia	Bojan Mijailović (loan return to Metalac G. M.)

=== OFK Odžaci ===
In: Note: Flags indicate national team as defined under FIFA eligibility rules; some limited exceptions apply. Players may hold more than one non-FIFA nationality.

No.	Pos.	Nation	Player
—	GK	Serbia	Petar Bijekić (loan return from Zardugar SM)
—	FW	Bosnia and Herzegovina	Mladen Galić (from Bačka BP)
—	GK	Serbia	Nemanja Latinović (from OFK Vrbas)
—	DF	Serbia	Lazar Popović (from Ozren Sokobanja)
—	MF	Serbia	Dimitrije Pobulić (from BSK Borča)
—	MF	Serbia	Nemanja Soković (from Cement Beočin)
—	MF	Serbia	Filip Đorđević (from Proleter Novi Sad)
—	DF	Serbia	Dejan Parezanović (on loan from Spartak Subotica)
—	DF	Serbia	Miloš Perišić (on loan from Partizan)
—	DF	Serbia	Mladen Veselinović (free, last with Bačka BP)
—	MF	Serbia	Stefan Matijević (from Dunav Stari Banovci)
—	MF	Bosnia and Herzegovina	Darko Jović (on loan from Vojvodina)
—	MF	Montenegro	Luka Tiodorović (from (Montenegro) Jedinstvo Bijelo Polje)

Out: Note: Flags indicate national team as defined under FIFA eligibility rules; some limited exceptions apply. Players may hold more than one non-FIFA nationality.

No.	Pos.	Nation	Player
—	MF	Serbia	Aleksandar Ćovin (to Bratstvo Prigrevica)
—	FW	Serbia	Vojislav Balabanović (to Bratstvo Prigrevica)
—	MF	Serbia	Nedo Slavuljica (to Bratstvo Prigrevica)
—	GK	Serbia	Nikola Studen (to Bratstvo Prigrevica)
—	MF	Serbia	Marko Labović (to Radnički Šid)
—	MF	Serbia	Lazar Čordašić (to Radnički Pirot)
—	DF	Serbia	Filip Sredojević (to Grafičar Beograd)
—	MF	Serbia	Nikola Tomić (to Hajduk Čurug)
—	DF	Serbia	Mladen Zgonjanin (to Cement Beočin)
—	DF	Serbia	Vladimir Stojanović (on loan to Sloga Temerin)
—		Serbia	Luka Kostić (on loan to Tekstilac Odžaci, previously brought from the same club)

=== OFK Beograd ===
In: Note: Flags indicate national team as defined under FIFA eligibility rules; some limited exceptions apply. Players may hold more than one non-FIFA nationality.

No.	Pos.	Nation	Player
9	FW	Serbia	Miljan Mrdaković (from Rad)
22	MF	Serbia	Predrag Luka (on loan from Mladost Lučani)
4	DF	Serbia	Danilo Nikolić (from (Kazakhstan) Akzhayik)
2	DF	Serbia	Predrag Đorđević (from Jagodina)
—	DF	Serbia	Zlatko Iličić (from BSK Borča)
25	FW	Serbia	Pavle Radunović (from Sinđelić Beograd)
15	MF	Serbia	Nikola Stojanović (from Sinđelić Beograd)
20	DF	Serbia	Miloš Tintor (from Novi Pazar)
29	GK	Bosnia and Herzegovina	Goran Vukliš (from (Bosnia and Herzegovina) Borac Banja Luka)
7	FW	Serbia	Lazar Romanić (on loan from Red Star Belgrade)
11	MF	Serbia	Milan Senić (on loan from Red Star Belgrade)
90	MF	Uganda	Khalid Aucho (from (South Africa) Baroka)
5	DF	Serbia	Draško Đorđević (on loan from Red Star Belgrade)
8	FW	Serbia	Bogdan Radojković (from Partizan)
14	MF	Japan	Takuto Yasuoka (from (Montenegro) Grafičar Podgorica)
—	FW	Serbia	Aleksa Dačić (from Red Star Belgrade, to youth team)

Out: Note: Flags indicate national team as defined under FIFA eligibility rules; some limited exceptions apply. Players may hold more than one non-FIFA nationality.

No.	Pos.	Nation	Player
33	DF	Serbia	Aleksa Damjanac (to (Spain) Mallorca B)
—	GK	Serbia	Stefan Čupić (to (Norway) Sarpsborg 08, was on loan at Bačka BP)
—	GK	Australia	Tomislav Arčaba (to (Australia) Newcastle Jets)
17	FW	Serbia	Borko Duronjić (to Voždovac)
19	FW	Serbia	Mladen Mrakić (to Zemun)
66	DF	New Zealand	Adam Mitchell (loan return to Red Star Belgrade)
—	FW	Australia	Vladimir Kosovac (to (Australia) Goulburn Valley Suns)
—	FW	Serbia	Nemanja Vidaković (to Napredak Kruševac, was on loan at (Indonesia) Bali United)
—	GK	Serbia	Stefan Nokić (to Dinamo Pančevo)
9	FW	Serbia	Filip Rajevac (to (Uzbekistan) Kokand 1912)
55	FW	Serbia	Nikola Lakčević (to Partizan)
24	FW	Serbia	Ivan Tapušković (to BSK Borča)
37	MF	Serbia	Stefan Janković (to BSK Borča)
—	MF	Serbia	Mladen Marković (to Rakovica)
—	GK	Cyprus	Alexander Špoljarić (on loan to Hajduk Beograd)
15	DF	Serbia	Filip Stanković (loan return to Red Star Belgrade)
20	MF	Serbia	Lazar Tufegdžić (loan return to Red Star Belgrade)
4	DF	Serbia	Stefan Rudan (to Bratstvo Prigrevica)
—	MF	Serbia	Božidar Veškovac (to Metalac G. M., was on loan at (Belgium) Gent II)
27	MF	Serbia	Strahinja Bosanac (to Kolubara)
29	GK	Serbia	Nikola Matek (on loan to Vršac)
—	DF	Serbia	Mile Šarenac (on loan to Vršac, was on loan at Radnički Zrenjanin)
3	MF	Montenegro	Danilo Bakić (to (Montenegro) Grbalj)
5	DF	Serbia	Filip Matović (released)
—	FW	Serbia	Nikola Čočović (released)
14	MF	Serbia	Lazar Nikolić (to Partizan)
—	FW	Serbia	Vukašin Jovković (to Partizan)
—	MF	Serbia	Armin Đerlek (released)

== See also ==
- Serbian SuperLiga
- 2016–17 Serbian SuperLiga
- Serbian First League
- 2016–17 Serbian First League
