= Stefan Tripković =

Stefan Tripković may refer to:

- Stefan Tripković (footballer, born 1993), Serbian association football player who plays for FK Sloga Petrovac na Mlavi
- Stefan Tripković (footballer, born 1994), Serbian association football player who plays for FK Voždovac
