= Lazar Tatić =

Serbian footballer (born 1994)

Personal information
- Full name: Lazar Tatić
- Date of birth: 1 April 1994 (age 32)
- Place of birth: Kraljevo, FR Yugoslavia
- Height: 1.94 m (6 ft 4 in)
- Position: Goalkeeper

Youth career
- Sloga Kraljevo

Senior career*
Years	Team	Apps	(Gls)
2012–2015	Sloga Kraljevo	2	(0)
2014	→ BASK (loan)	4	(0)
2015	→ Kolubara (loan)	1	(0)
2015–2016	Jagodina	19	(0)
2016	Radnik Surdulica	0	(0)
2017	Napredak Kruševac	0	(0)
2018	OFK Bačka	0	(0)
2019	Trikala	0	(0)
2019	Budućnost Dobanovci	6	(0)
2020–2021	Sloga Kraljevo		
2023–2024	Trstenik		
- * Club domestic league appearances and goals as of 15 November 2019

Lazar Tatić (Serbian Cyrillic: Лазар Татић; born 1 April 1994) is a Serbian footballer who plays as a goalkeeper.

== Club career ==
=== Sloga Kraljevo ===
Originating from Trstenik, Tatić was born in Kraljevo, where he started his football career with local club Sloga. After he had replaced Nikola Košanin on goal, Tatić joined the first team, as a first goalkeeper of youth team in the second half of 2011–12 season. After Aleksandar Božović was injured and Mihajlo Pantović left the club for a period, Tatić was in protocol several times as a reserve goalkeeper for Nemanja Nastić. At the beginning of new season, Aleksandar Božović was gradually recovering from injury, and returned on goal after 7 fixtures. Nemanja Nastić left the club in winter break off-season and Sloga signed more experienced Bojan Šejić, so Tatić stayed as the third choice. He was also with youth team until the end of the 2012–13 season, along with Vladan Grbović, a two-year-younger competitor, who was also keeping for the cadet team. Turning out of youth team, Tatić stayed as a competitor for two older colleagues, Božović and Šejić. For the first half of 2013–14 season he played only friendly matches, so club management and coach Veljko Dovedan decided to send him on loan to get more experience. In winter break off-season, as a young goalkeeper, Tatić moved to BASK, on loan. Playing for BASK, Tatić made 4 appearances in the Serbian League Belgrade. For the 2014–15 season, Sloga decided to give a chance to players who had grown up in youth school, and Tatić returned from loan. He mostly spent time as a reserve for captain Aleksandar Božović, but also played 2 league matches, against Radnik Surdulica and Inđija, and 1 cup match against Voždovac. For the spring half of 2014–15 season Tatić played with Kolubara, usually as the third choice after Uroš Matić and Nenad Ranković, playing just the last fixture against Inđija.

=== Jagodina ===
Tatić joined Jagodina in summer 2015 and he started 2015–16 season as a backup for Đorđe Nikolić. He made his SuperLiga debut on 23 September 2015, on the match against Vojvodina. For the next two matches he saved his goal. During the first half of 2015–16 season, Tatić mostly got the chances in cup matches. Later, same season, Nikolić injured in a 21 fixture Serbian SuperLiga match against Vojvodina, Tatić replaced him, and spent the rest of the season usually as the first choice. Next the end of season, after Jagodina relegated to the Serbian First League, Tatić left the club.

=== Radnik Surdulica ===
After he spent some period during the pre-season training with the club, Tatić officially joined Radnik Surdulica in last days of the summer transfer window 2016 along with several other players, signing one-year contract. After a month he spent in Radnik Surdulica without official caps, Tatić left the club and moved on trial to Red Star Belgrade.

=== Napredak Kruševac ===
At the beginning of 2017, Tatić joined Napredak Kruševac, signing a three-and-a-half-year deal with club. He had been ordered with 33 jersey. At the beginning of new season, in summer 2017, Tatić converted his squad number to 94 for the 2017–18 campaign. In mid-season, both sides agreed on mutually termination the contract and Tatić left the club as a free agent, without any official appearance.

=== Bačka ===
On 11 June 2018, Tatić signed a one-and-a-half-year contract with OFK Bačka. He started the 2018–19 pre-season with the club, as one of the competitors for new Serbian SuperLiga campaign along with Rastko Šuljagić and Kristijan Župić.

== Career statistics ==
As of 9 January 2018

Appearances and goals by club, season and competition
Club	Season	League			Cup		Continental		Other		Total	
Club	Season	Division	Apps	Goals	Apps	Goals	Apps	Goals	Apps	Goals	Apps	Goals
Sloga Kraljevo	2011–12	Serbian First League	0	0	—		—		—		0	0
Sloga Kraljevo	2012–13	Serbian First League	0	0	0	0	—		—		0	0
Sloga Kraljevo	2013–14	Serbian First League	0	0	0	0	—		—		0	0
Sloga Kraljevo	2014–15	Serbian First League	2	0	1	0	—		—		3	0
Sloga Kraljevo	Total		2	0	1	0	—		—		3	0
BASK (loan)	2013–14	Serbian League Belgrade	4	0	—		—		—		4	0
Kolubara (loan)	2014–15	Serbian First League	1	0	—		—		—		1	0
Jagodina	2015–16	Serbian SuperLiga	19	0	3	0	—		—		22	0
Radnik Surdulica	2016–17	Serbian SuperLiga	0	0	0	0	—		—		0	0
Napredak Kruševac	2016–17	Serbian SuperLiga	0	0	—		—		—		0	0
Napredak Kruševac	2017–18	Serbian SuperLiga	0	0	0	0	—		—		0	0
Napredak Kruševac	Total		0	0	0	0	—		—		0	0
Career total			26	0	4	0	—		—		30	0
