= Stavrić =

Stavrić is a surname. Notable people with the surname include:

- Milan Stavrić (born 1987), Serbian footballer
- Nenad Stavrić (1963–2007), Serbian football player and manager
