= Miloš Ostojić =

Miloš Ostojić may refer to:

- Miloš Ostojić (footballer, born 1991), Serbian association football defender
- Miloš Ostojić (footballer, born 1996), Serbian association football goalkeeper
