= Arifović =

Arifović (Serbian Cyrillic: Арифовић) is a Slavic surname. Notable people with the surname include:

- Ensar Arifović (born 1980), Bosnian football striker
- Ibrahim Arifović (born 1990), Serbian football player of Bosniak origin
