= Marko Simic =

Marko Simic may refer to:

- Marko Šimić (footballer, born 1985), Croatian football goalkeeper
- Marko Šimić (footballer, born 1988), Croatian football striker
- Marko Simić (footballer, born 1987), Montenegrin football defender
- Marko Simić (footballer, born 1993), Serbian football forward
