= Miloš Plavšić =

Serbian footballer

Personal information
- Date of birth: 4 April 1990 (age 36)
- Place of birth: Vrbas, SFR Yugoslavia
- Height: 1.84 m (6 ft 1/2 in)
- Position: Central midfielder

Team information
- Current team: Proleter Ravno Selo

Youth career
- Vojvodina

Senior career*
| Years | Team | Apps | (Gls) |
| 2008–2009 | Veternik | | |
| 2009–2010 | Cement Beočin | | |
| 2010 | Borac Novi Sad | | |
| 2011 | Palić | 11 | (1) |
| 2011–2012 | OFK Kikinda | 23 | (0) |
| 2012 | Vujić Voda | 10 | (0) |
| 2013 | ČSK Čelarevo | 13 | (1) |
| 2013–2016 | Iskra Borčice | | |
| 2016 | → Nové Mesto nad Váhom (loan) | 7 | (0) |
| 2016 | ČSK Čelarevo | 14 | (4) |
| 2017 | Novi Pazar | 14 | (1) |
| 2017 | Radnik Surdulica | 3 | (0) |
| 2018 | Inđija | 13 | (2) |
| 2018–2019 | TSC | 27 | (3) |
| 2019–2020 | Radnik Bijeljina | 8 | (2) |
| 2020 | Jagodina | 4 | (0) |
| 2021 | Zlatibor Čajetina | 5 | (0) |
| 2021–2022 | Inđija | 18 | (1) |
| 2022 | → Radnički SM (loan) | 1 | (0) |
| 2022–2024 | Tekstilac Odžaci | | |
| 2024 | Proleter Ravno Selo | | |
- * Club domestic league appearances and goals as of 15 February 2024

Miloš Plavšić (Serbian Cyrillic: Милош Плавшић; born 4 April 1990) is a Serbian professional footballer who plays as a central midfielder for Proleter Ravno Selo.

== Club career ==
Born in Vrbas, Plavšić passed the youth school of Vojvodina. After youth categories, Plavšić played as a senior with lower league clubs Veternik, Cement Beočin, Borac Novi Sad, Kikinda, Vujić Voda and ČSK Čelarevo, and was also a member of Hajduk Kula for a period.

In 2013, Plavšić moved to Slovak side Iskra Borčice, where he stayed as a club member until 2016, also working in a butcher shop with some other teammates. In summer 2016, he joined ČSK Čelarevo for the second time. After he scored 4 goals on 14 First League caps, also playing a cup match against Red Star Belgrade, Plavšić signed a professional contract with Novi Pazar until the end of the 2016–17 Serbian SuperLiga season.

In the summer of 2017, Plavšić moved to Radnik Surdulica. Playing just 4 matches at total under coach Simo Krunić, Plavšić decided to terminate the contract in mid-season. In early 2018, Plavšić joined Inđija. After Inđija, he also played for TSC from 2018 to 2019, with whom he won the 2018–19 Serbian First League and got promoted to the Serbian SuperLiga.

On 24 June 2019, Plavšić signed a two-year contract with Premier League of Bosnia and Herzegovina club Radnik Bijeljina. He made his official debut for Radnik on 11 July 2019, in a 2–0 home win against Spartak Trnava in the 2019–20 UEFA Europa League first qualifying round, coming in for Dejan Maksimović as a 78th minute substitute. Plavšić played his first league game for Radnik in a 2–1 home win against Čelik Zenica on 25 September 2019. His first scored goal for the club came on 28 September 2019, in a 1–4 away league win against Zvijezda 09. Plavšić left Radnik in June 2020 after his contract with the club expired.

== Honours ==
TSC

- Serbian First League: 2018–19
