= Miloš Ostojić (footballer, born 1996) =

Serbian footballer

Personal information
- Full name: Miloš Ostojić
- Date of birth: 21 April 1996 (age 30)
- Place of birth: Sombor, FR Yugoslavia
- Height: 1.89 m (6 ft 2 in)
- Position: Goalkeeper

Team information
- Current team: Sloven
- Number: 30

Youth career
- 2008–2015: OFK Beograd

Senior career*
Years	Team	Apps	(Gls)
2013–2015	OFK Beograd	0	(0)
2015–2016	Istra 1961	0	(0)
2016	Voždovac	0	(0)
2016	→ Hajduk Beograd (loan)	12	(0)
2017–2020	Spartak Subotica	80	(0)
2020	→ Kolubara (loan)	6	(0)
2020–2021	Napredak Kruševac	11	(0)
2021	Novi Pazar	7	(0)
2021–2022	Radnik Surdulica	4	(0)
2022–2023	Mladost Lučani	4	(0)
2023–2024	Radnički SM	46	(0)
2025–	Sloven	17	(0)

International career
2011–2012	Serbia U16		
2012–2013	Serbia U17	6	(0)
2013–2014	Serbia U18	1	(0)
2013–2014	Serbia U19	2	(0)
2017	Serbia U20	1	(0)
2017–2019	Serbia U21	1	(0)
- * Club domestic league appearances and goals as of 25 June 2025

Miloš Ostojić (Serbian Cyrillic: Милош Остојић; born 21 April 1996) is a Serbian professional footballer who plays as a goalkeeper for Sloven.

== Club career ==
=== Early years ===
Born in Sombor, Ostojić passed OFK Beograd youth categories. After he was nominated for the best goalkeeper in academy in 2012 and 2013, he signed his first professional contract with club at the beginning of 2014. As the first team member, Ostojić spent a period between 2013 and 2015, but without senior appearances. In summer 2015, when he overgrown youth selection, he decided to leave the club. Later he moved to Croatian First Football League side Istra 1961, where he spent the 2015–16 season as an option, without official caps. He was also involved in the incident on training in November 2015, when he was beaten by teammate Stefan Nikolić. In 2016, he signed with Voždovac, but closely moved on loan to Belgrade Zone League side Hajduk Beograd in last days of the summer transfer window.

=== Spartak Subotica ===
Ostojić joined Spartak Subotica at the beginning of 2017 and spent some period on trial, playing several friendly matches during the winter break off-season. He signed a contract with club along with experienced Bojan Jović, who started the spring half-season as the first choice goalkeeper. Ostojić made his professional debut for new club under coach Andrey Chernyshov in the 24 fixture home match against Čukarički, played on 4 March 2017. In May 2018, Ostojić injured ligaments during training, after which he missed the last fixture match of the 2017–18 Serbian SuperLiga campaign against Partizan.

== International career ==
At the beginning of 2011, Ostojić was selected in Serbian under-15 national selection, after which he was also called Serbian national levels under 16 and 17 years until 2013. In summer 2013, Ostojić got a debut call-up into the Serbia u19 team under coach Veljko Paunović and made his debut for the team at the memorial tournament "Stevan Vilotić - Ćele", in a match played on 7 September against Ukraine. He also made his debut for Serbia U18 in December of the same year, where he stayed as a member until 2014. As a coach of Serbia U19 team, Ivan Tomić also invited him into the squad in 2014, when he also capped once time. Ostojić was called into the Serbia U20 under coach Milan Obradović in June 2017, when he made his debut for the team in a friendly match against Israel. Ostojić got his first call in Serbian under-21 team by coach Goran Đorović in August 2017. He made his debut for the team in away friendly against Qatar U23 team on 17 December 2017.

== Career statistics ==
As of 4 August 2019

Appearances and goals by club, season and competition
Club	Season	League			Cup		Continental		Other		Total	
Club	Season	Division	Apps	Goals	Apps	Goals	Apps	Goals	Apps	Goals	Apps	Goals
OFK Beograd	2012–13	Serbian SuperLiga	0	0	0	0	—		—		0	0
OFK Beograd	2013–14	Serbian SuperLiga	0	0	0	0	—		—		0	0
OFK Beograd	2014–15	Serbian SuperLiga	0	0	0	0	—		—		0	0
OFK Beograd	Total		0	0	0	0	—		—		0	0
Istra 1961	2015–16	1. HNL	0	0	0	0	—		—		0	0
Voždovac	2016–17	Serbian SuperLiga	0	0	0	0	—		—		0	0
Hajduk Beograd (loan)	2016–17	Belgrade Zone League	12	0	—		—		0	0	12	0
Spartak Subotica	2016–17	Serbian SuperLiga	12	0	—		—		—		12	0
Spartak Subotica	2017–18	Serbian SuperLiga	35	0	1	0	—		—		36	0
Spartak Subotica	2018–19	Serbian SuperLiga	28	0	0	0	0	0	—		28	0
Spartak Subotica	2019–20	Serbian SuperLiga	3	0	0	0	0	0	—		3	0
Spartak Subotica	Total		78	0	1	0	0	0	—		79	0
Career total			90	0	1	0	0	0	0	0	91	0
