= Bojan Mijailović =

Serbian footballer

Personal information
- Date of birth: 28 August 1995 (age 31)
- Place of birth: Gornji Milanovac, FR Yugoslavia
- Height: 1.85 m (6 ft 1 in)
- Positions: Right-back; right wing

Team information
- Current team: Metalac Gornji Milanovac
- Number: 32

Youth career
- Metalac Gornji Milanovac

Senior career*
Years	Team	Apps	(Gls)
2013–2014	Metalac Gornji Milanovac	2	(0)
2014	Takovo		
2015–2020	Metalac Gornji Milanovac	11	(0)
2016–2017	→ Kolubara (loan)	15	(0)
2020–2021	Javor Ivanjica	1	(0)
2021	Zlatibor Čajetina	8	(0)
2021–2022	Loznica	21	(0)
2022-2023	Trayal Kruševac	34	(0)
2023-	Metalac Gornji Milanovac	21	(1)
- * Club domestic league appearances and goals as of 20 July 2024

Bojan Mijailović (Serbian Cyrillic: Бојан Мијаиловић; born 28 August 1995) is a Serbian professional footballer who plays as a defender for Metalac Gornji Milanovac.

== Club career ==
=== Metalac Gornji Milanovac ===
Mijailović is a product of Metalac's youth school, and was a member of generation which made promotion to the best level Serbian youth league in 2014. He made his debut for Metalac in 2012–13 season. Next season he made 1 league appearance too, but he was sitting on the bench several times. He also played 1 cup match against Partizan, and one play-off match for the Serbian SuperLiga, against Rad. Second match he started on the field, but complained of a headache from the tear gas that caused the match later was interrupted. After youth career, he left Metalac and joined local Zone league club Takovo, but he returned in his home club after six months and signed four-year contract at the beginning of 2015. He made his SuperLiga debut in the 7th fixture of 2015–16, against Spartak Subotica. In summer 2016, Mijailović moved on one-year loan to Serbian First League side Kolubara.

== Career statistics ==
=== Club ===
As of 1 January 2017

Club	Season	League			Cup		Continental		Other		Total	
Club	Season	Division	Apps	Goals	Apps	Goals	Apps	Goals	Apps	Goals	Apps	Goals
Metalac	2012–13	First League	1	0	0	0	—		—		1	0
Metalac	2013–14	First League	1	0	1	0	—		1 (Note: Appearance in league play-offs)	0	3	0
Metalac	2014–15	First League	0	0	—		—		0	0	0	0
Metalac	2015–16	SuperLiga	11	0	1	0	—		—		11	0
Metalac	2016–17	SuperLiga	0	0	—		—		—		0	0
Metalac	Total		13	0	2	0	—		1	0	16	0
Kolubara (loan)	2016–17	First League	15	0	0	0	—		—		15	0
Career total			28	0	2	0	—		1	0	31	0
