= Arton Zekaj =

Kosovan footballer

Personal information
- Full name: Arton Din Zekaj
- Date of birth: 16 April 2000 (age 26)
- Place of birth: Subotica, Serbia, FR Yugoslavia
- Height: 1.87 m (6 ft 2 in)
- Position: Defensive midfielder

Youth career
- –2015: Spartak Subotica
- 2015–2018: Partizan

Senior career*
Years	Team	Apps	(Gls)
2016	Partizan	0	(0)
2016	→ OFK Bačka (loan)	0	(0)
2018	Sopot		
2018	Lille	1	(0)
2018–2021	Lille II	16	(0)
2022–2023	Tisa Adorjan		
2024–2025	Swift Hesperange	15	(1)

International career^{‡}
2014–2016	Serbia U15	3	(0)
2016	Serbia U16	4	(0)
2017	Serbia U17		
2019–2020	Kosovo U21	5	(0)
- * Club domestic league appearances and goals as of 26 June 2025 ‡ National team caps and goals as of 17 November 2020

Arton Din Zekaj (Serbian Cyrillic: Артон Дин Зекај; born 16 April 2000) is a professional footballer who most recently played as a defensive midfielder for Luxembourg National Division club Swift Hesperange. Born in Serbia, he represents Kosovo at under-21 international level.

== Club career ==
=== Early career ===
Zekaj started playing football with Spartak Subotica. In 2015, he joined the youth system of Partizan. During the 2016–17 season, he was loaned to OFK Bačka, and although placed on the senior team, he failed to make a debut in the Serbian SuperLiga. On 14 February 2018, Zekaj joined Serbian League Belgrade side Sopot.

=== Lille ===
On 4 July 2018, Zekaj signed a three-year contract with Ligue 1 club Lille. On 11 August 2018, he made his debut as professional footballer in a 3–1 home win against Rennes after coming on as a substitute at last minutes in place of Lebo Mothiba. Seven day later, Zekaj made another debut with Lille, but with second team in a Championnat National 2 match against Épinal after being named in the starting line-up.

=== Tisa Adorjan ===
During the 2022 summer transfer window, Zekaj joined Serbian League Vojvodina side Tisa Adorjan. On 5 November 2022, he made his debut in a 3–0 away win against Radnički Zrenjanin after coming on as a substitute at 46th minute in place of Dragan Svitić.

=== Swift Hesperange ===
In December 2024, Zekaj becomes part of Luxembourg National Division side Swift Hesperange with which he was named as a substitute for the first time in a league match against Progrès Niederkorn. His debut with Swift Hesperange came on 9 February 2025 against US Hostert after being named in the starting line-up and assisted his side's first goal during a 3–0 home win.

== International career ==
=== Serbia ===
Zekaj has been part of Serbia at youth international level, respectively has been part of the U15, U16 and U17 teams, where he has been the team captain in several matches played. Zekaj was a member of the U15 team from 2014 to 2016, when he was promoted to the U16 team, with whom he won third place in the 2016 Viktor Bannikov Memorial Tournament, where he led the team as captain in the final match against Latvia.

=== Kosovo ===
"Zekaj expected be invited to one of the upcoming gatherings of Kosovo U21 and guessed this is very big talent due to an Albanian would had it impossible to play for Partizan or Serbia national teams."

— Kosovo U15 coach Isa Sadriu shares his first impression for Zekaj.

On 3 April 2017, Zekaj visited Pristina together with his father, a consultant and a representative of Partizan and met with the leaders of the Football Federation of Kosovo. The meeting was held to clarify procedures to enable him to play for Kosovo national team.

==== Under-21 ====
"For me, it is great pride that I have chosen Kosovo and that I will wear this jersey, as in this way I will make them proud as my parents, my family and all the people of Kosovo and also a great man who is no longer among us – the legend, Fadil Vokrri."

— Zekaj shares his first impression after the permitting to play for Kosovo.

On 27 April 2019, The Football Federation of Kosovo confirmed through a communiqué that Zekaj is obtained with the Kosovan passport and is ready to play for Kosovo national under-21 team in the next 2021 UEFA European Under-21 Championship qualification matches in September 2019.

Zekaj was planned to be called up from Kosovo U21 in June 2019 for 2021 UEFA European Under-21 Championship qualification matches against Andorra U21 and Turkey U21, but due to injury, could not be part of the national team.

On 2 September 2019, he received a call-up from Kosovo U21 for the 2021 UEFA European Under-21 Championship qualification match against England U21 and made his debut after being named in the starting line-up.

== Personal life ==
Zekaj was born in Subotica, Serbia to Kosovo Albanian parents from Has of Prizren.
