= Murod Rajabov =

Uzbekistani footballer (born 1995)

Personal information
- Date of birth: 5 July 1995 (age 31)
- Place of birth: G‘uzor, Uzbekistan
- Position: Midfielder

Team information
- Current team: Sogdiana Jizzakh

Senior career*
Years	Team	Apps	(Gls)
2015	Shurtan Guzar	16	(2)
2016–2017	AGMK Olmaliq	5	(0)
2016	→ Novi Pazar (loan)	3	(0)
2017	Navbahor Namangan	3	(0)
2018	Nurafshon Tashkent		
2019–	Sogdiana Jizzakh	1	(0)
- * Club domestic league appearances and goals as of 16 June 2019

Murod Rajabov (Russian: Мурод Раджабов; born 5 July 1995) is an Uzbekistani footballer who plays as a midfielderfor FC Sogdiana Jizzakh in the Uzbek League.

== Club career ==
Born in G‘uzor, Rajabov played with FC Shurtan Guzar in the 2015 Uzbek League, and with AGMK Olmaliq in the first half of the 2016 Uzbek League.

In summer 2016, he moved abroad and signed a loan with Serbian top-tier side FK Novi Pazar. He made 3 appearances in the 2016–17 Serbian SuperLiga and during winter-break he returned to his former club, Olmaliq FK.

Upon returning, he played on loan with PFC Navbahor Namangan in the 2017 Uzbek League. At the end of the season he returned to AGMK Olmaliq and was released, signing right next with FC Nurafshon Tashkent and helping the team to finish runner-up of the Uzbekistan Pro League B. He called the attention of top-league side FC Sogdiana Jizzakh that brought him to their squad for the 2019 Uzbekistan Super League.

== International career ==
He was called for the Uzbekistani Olympic team training camp that took place from 11 to 16 July 2015.

== Honours ==
Shurtan Guzar

- UzPFL Cup: 2015
