= Uroš Đurić (footballer) =

Serbian footballer

Personal information
- Date of birth: 1 December 1993 (age 32)
- Place of birth: Belgrade, FR Yugoslavia
- Height: 1.93 m (6 ft 4 in)
- Position: Goalkeeper

Team information
- Current team: Kormákur/Hvöt

Senior career*
Years	Team	Apps	(Gls)
2010–2013	Šumadija Jagnjilo	36	(0)
2013–2014	Sopot	16	(0)
2014–2015	Turbina Vreoci	17	(0)
2015–2016	Sopot	36	(0)
2017	Sloboda Užice	26	(0)
2018	Dinamo Vranje	31	(0)
2019	Renova	18	(0)
2019–2021	Struga	49	(0)
2021	→ Egnatia Rrogozhinë (loan)	4	(0)
2022	Zlatibor Čajetina	4	(0)
2022-2023	Prva Iskra		
2023-	Kormákur/Hvöt	30	(0)
- * Club domestic league appearances and goals as of 13 July 2024

Uroš Đurić (Serbian Cyrillic: Урош Ђурић; born 1 December 1993) is a Serbian footballer who plays as a goalkeeper for Icelandic side Kormákur/Hvöt.
