= Pavle Radunović =

Serbian footballer

Personal information
- Date of birth: 26 May 1996 (age 30)
- Place of birth: Belgrade, FR Yugoslavia
- Height: 1.91 m (6 ft 3 in)
- Position: Forward

Team information
- Current team: Panevėžys
- Number: 96

Youth career
- 2012–2016: Rad

Senior career*
Years	Team	Apps	(Gls)
2016	Sinđelić Beograd	11	(0)
2017–2018	OFK Beograd	14	(3)
2018	Baltika Kaliningrad	17	(0)
2019	Sinđelić Beograd	15	(2)
2020	OFK Petrovac	3	(0)
2020	Rad	9	(1)
2021	ASU Politehnica	9	(0)
2022	Timok	9	(2)
2022–2024	Mačva Šabac	60	(18)
2024-	Panevėžys	16	(6)
- * Club domestic league appearances and goals as of 5 May 2025

Pavle Radunović (Serbian Cyrillic: Павле Радуновић; born 26 May 1996) is a Serbian professional footballer who plays as a forward.

== Club career ==
He made his Serbian First League debut for FK Sinđelić Beograd on 5 March 2016 in a game against FK Donji Srem.

On 11 June 2018, he signed a one-year deal with the Russian club FC Baltika Kaliningrad. The contract was dissolved by mutual consent on 22 December 2018.

On 25 September 2024 Panevėžys Club announced about the contract with Pavle Radunović. One day later, on 26 September 2024, he made his debut in A lyga against FA Šiauliai, but Panevėžys lost this match 1-2.

In February 2025 Pavle Radunović left Panevėžys Club. On 13 March 2025 announced that he returned back to Panevėžys Club.

== Personal life ==
His twin brother Boris is also a professional footballer, playing for Cagliari in the Serie A.
