= Kristijan Župić =

Serbian footballer (born 2000)

Personal information
- Full name: Kristijan Župić
- Date of birth: 30 June 2000 (age 26)
- Place of birth: Novi Sad, FR Yugoslavia
- Height: 1.88 m (6 ft 2 in)
- Position: Goalkeeper

Youth career
- Prof. Bolesnikov
- Proleter Novi Sad

Senior career*
Years	Team	Apps	(Gls)
2016	Proleter Novi Sad	0	(0)
2017–2019	OFK Bačka	1	(0)
2018	→ Cement Beočin (loan)	2	(0)
2019	→ Osijek II (loan)	0	(0)
2019–2020	Osijek II	0	(0)
2020–2021	Javor Ivanjica	0	(0)
2021–2022	Proleter Novi Sad	2	(0)
2023	Crikvenica		
2023	Bistrica	15	(0)
2024	Aluminij	0	(0)
2025	Drava Ptuj	8	(0)
- * Club domestic league appearances and goals as of 26 March 2024

Kristijan Župić (Serbian Cyrillic: Кристијан Жупић; born 30 June 2000) is a Serbian professional footballer who plays as a goalkeeper.

== Club career ==
=== Early years ===
Born in Novi Sad, Župić started training football in "Bolesnikov" football academy at the age of 6. He made his first football steps as a regular player, but later decided to be a goalkeeper. He passed A.C. Milan junior training camp in 2010, where he was elected for the best goalkeeper. Župić came through the Proleter Novi Sad youth categories, where appeared until the end of 2016. He also joined the first team, staying on the bench as an unused substitution in 6 fixture match of the 2016–17 Serbian First League season, against Inđija.

=== Bačka ===
At the beginning of 2017, Župić signed with Serbian SuperLiga side OFK Bačka. He made his professional debut in last fixture of the 2016–17 season at the age of 16, under coach Zoran Govedarica, replacing Nemanja Jevrić in 80 minute of the match against Spartak Subotica, played on 21 May 2017 at the Subotica City Stadium. Joining the game, Župić became the youngest goalkeeper in the Serbian SuperLiga. At the beginning of 2018, Župić signed a six-month scholarship contract with the club. Turning an adult in summer same year, Župić extended the deal with the club, penning his first four-year professional contract until 2022.

==== Loan to Cement ====
Following the contract extension, Župić moved on loan to the Serbian League Vojvodina side Cement Beočin. Župić made his debut in an official match for Cement on 16 September, in a draw against Železničar Pančevo, and kept clean sheet.

==== Loan to NK Osijek II ====
Beginning of 2019, Župić is on loan to Osijek II, who is a winner of Junior HNL II championship of 2019.

== Career statistics ==
As of 24 January 2019

Appearances and goals by club, season and competition
Club	Season	League			Cup		Continental		Other		Total	
Club	Season	Division	Apps	Goals	Apps	Goals	Apps	Goals	Apps	Goals	Apps	Goals
Proleter Novi Sad	2016–17	Serbian First League	0	0	0	0	—		—		0	0
OFK Bačka	2016–17	Serbian SuperLiga	1	0	—		—		—		1	0
OFK Bačka	2017–18	Serbian SuperLiga	0	0	0	0	—		—		0	0
OFK Bačka	2018–19	Serbian SuperLiga	0	0	—		—		—		0	0
OFK Bačka	Total		1	0	0	0	—		—		1	0
Cement Beočin (loan)	2018–19	Serbian League Vojvodina	2	0	—		—		—		2	0
Osijek II (loan)	2018–19	Druga HNL	0	0	—		—		—		0	0
Career total			3	0	0	0	—		—		3	0
