= Janko Langura =

Serbian politician and former professional footballer

- Јанко Лангура

Member of the National Assembly
- In office 3 August 2020 – 1 August 2022

Personal details
- Born: 25 April 1994 (age 32) Priboj, FR Yugoslavia
- Party: Serbian Progressive Party
Association football career
- Position: Goalkeeper
Youth career
- 2010–2013: Metalac Gornji Milanovac
Senior career*
Years	Team	Apps	(Gls)
2012–2014	Metalac Gornji Milanovac	0	(0)
2013–2014	→Rudar Kostolac (loan)	16	(0)
2014–2015	Rudar Kostolac	12	(0)
2015–2016	Loznica	1	(0)
2016	→Mačva Šabac (loan)	2	(0)
2016	Mačva Šabac	0	(0)
2017	Dinamo Vranje	3	(0)
2017	Takovo	0	(0)
2018	Železničar Lajkovac	10	(0)
2018–2019	Metalac Gornji Milanovac	0	(0)
- * Club domestic league appearances and goals

Janko Langura (Serbian Cyrillic: Јанко Лангура; born 25 April 1994) is a Serbian politician and former professional footballer. He played as a goalkeeper from 2013 to 2019 and has been a member of the National Assembly of Serbia since 2020. Langura is a member of the Serbian Progressive Party.

== Early life and football career ==
Langura was born in Priboj, Serbia, which was part of the Federal Republic of Yugoslavia at that time. He earned a bachelor's degree in economics.

He was signed to FK Metalac Gornji Milanovac (2013), FK Rudar Kostolac (2013–15), FK Loznica (2015), FK Mačva Šabac (2016), FK Dinamo Vranje (2017), FK Takovo (2017–18), FK Železničar (2018) and FK Metalac Gornji Milanovac again (2018–19). He saw action in four games: one for Loznica and three for Dimano Vranje. He now lives in Gornji Milanovac.

== Politician ==
Langura became known to the public in October 2019, when he verbally clashed with the leader of Dveri, Boško Obradović. In February 2020, Langura was physically assaulted and on that occasion he sustained head injuries.

Langura received the 155th position on the Progressive Party's Aleksandar Vučić — For Our Children list in the 2020 Serbian parliamentary election and was elected when the list won a landslide majority with 188 out of 250 mandates. He is now a member of the assembly committee on the diaspora and Serbs in the region; a deputy member of the committee on the economy, regional development, trade, tourism, and energy; a deputy member of the committee on finance, state budget, and control of public spending; the leader of Serbia's parliamentary friendship group with Kuwait; and a member of the parliamentary friendship groups with Norway, Slovenia, Sweden, and Switzerland.

He was also given the fifth position on the Progressive Party's list for the Gornji Milanovac municipal assembly in the concurrent 2020 Serbian local elections and was elected when the list won a majority with twenty-seven out of forty-nine seats.
