= Georgije Ilić =

Serbian footballer

Personal information
- Full name: Georgije Ilić
- Date of birth: 13 May 1995 (age 31)
- Place of birth: Ruma, FR Yugoslavia
- Height: 1.82 m (5 ft 11 1/2 in)
- Position: Striker

Youth career
- –2013: Vojvodina

Senior career*
| Years | Team | Apps | (Gls) |
| 2013–2015 | Vojvodina | 4 | (0) |
| 2014 | → Radnički Kragujevac (loan) | 2 | (0) |
| 2014–2015 | → Cement Beočin (loan) | 17 | (3) |
| 2015–2016 | ČSK Čelarevo | 19 | (3) |
| 2016 | Napredak Kruševac | 1 | (0) |
| 2017 | Rad | 0 | (0) |
| 2017 | → ČSK Čelarevo (loan) | 10 | (0) |
| 2017–2018 | ČSK Čelarevo | 12 | (1) |
| 2018 | Radnički Sremska Mitrovica | | |
| 2019 | Kabel | | |
| 2020 | FK 1. Maj Ruma | | |
| 2021 | FK Feniks | | |
| 2021-2022 | FK Sloga Voganj | | |
| 2022-2024 | FK Sloven Ruma | | |

International career
| 2011–2012 | Serbia U18 | 3 | (2) |
| 2012–2013 | Serbia U19 | 6 | (3) |
- * Club domestic league appearances and goals as of 19 November 2018

Georgije Ilić (Serbian Cyrillic: Георгије Илић; born 13 May 1995) is a Serbian footballer who plays for Radnički Sremska Mitrovica.

== Youth years ==
Ilić is a product of FK Vojvodina's youth academy. He was the member of the youth squad that won two successive youth league titles.

== Club career ==
=== Vojvodina ===
On April 13, 2013, Ilić made his first-team debut, under coach Nebojša Vignjević, in a 2:2 home draw with Sloboda Užice.
