= Miloš Perišić =

Serbian footballer

Personal information
- Full name: Miloš Perišić
- Date of birth: 2 April 1995 (age 31)
- Place of birth: Knin, Croatia
- Height: 1.88 m (6 ft 2 in)
- Position: Centre-back

Youth career
- 2009–2010: OFK Beograd
- 2010–2013: Partizan

Senior career*
| Years | Team | Apps | (Gls) |
| 2013–2015 | Teleoptik | 26 | (1) |
| 2015–2017 | Partizan | 0 | (0) |
| 2015 | → Sinđelić Beograd (loan) | 14 | (1) |
| 2016 | → Teleoptik (loan) | 13 | (3) |
| 2016 | → Radnički Pirot (loan) | 7 | (0) |
| 2017 | → OFK Odžaci (loan) | 10 | (0) |
| 2017–2018 | Borac Čačak | 20 | (0) |
| 2018–2019 | Farense | 6 | (0) |
| 2021–2022 | Donji Srem | | |
- * Club domestic league appearances and goals as of 5 July 2022

Miloš Perišić (Serbian Cyrillic: Милош Перишић; born 2 April 1995) is a Serbian football defender who last played for Farense.

== Club career ==
Perišić signed his first professional contract with Partizan in 2015, after coming through their youth ranks.
