= Ibrahim Arifović =

Serbian footballer

Personal information
- Date of birth: 22 March 1990 (age 36)
- Place of birth: Novi Pazar, SFR Yugoslavia
- Height: 1.82 m (6 ft 0 in)
- Position: Left-back

Team information
- Current team: Prespa Birlik
- Number: 16

Youth career
- 1998–2008: Novi Pazar

Senior career*
Years	Team	Apps	(Gls)
2008–2009	Novi Pazar	24	(0)
2010	Sopot	6	(0)
2010–2014	Novi Pazar	36	(0)
2015	Berane	13	(0)
2015	Kastrioti Krujë	9	(0)
2016	Berane		
2016	Jošanica	7	(0)
2017	Novi Pazar	17	(2)
2018	TB/FC Suðuroy/Royn	25	(1)
2019	1.FC Novi Pazar 95	13	(1)
2019–	Prespa Birlik	5	(0)
- * Club domestic league appearances and goals as of 22:17, 6 August 2019 (UTC)

Ibrahim Arifović (Serbian Cyrillic: Ибрахим Арифовић; born 22 July 1990) is a Serbian professional footballer who plays as a left-back for Prespa Birlik.

== Career ==
Born in Novi Pazar, SR Serbia, which back then was still within Yugoslavia, he played many years with his local club FK Novi Pazar in the Serbian SuperLiga. In the first semester of 2015 he played with FK Berane in the Montenegrin First League. The next season he played the first 6 months with KS Kastrioti in Albanian Superliga. Later he returned to Berane and after the first half of the 2016–17 season he spent with Jošanica in the Serbian League West, he joined his home club Novi Pazar for the third time at the beginning of 2017. On 31 January 2018, Arifović signed a one-year contract with TB/FC Suðuroy/Royn.
