= FK Turbina Vreoci =

Turbina Vreoci
- Full name: Fudbalski Klub Turbina Vreoci
- Founded: 1945; 81 years ago
- Capacity: 550
- League: Belgrade First League - Group B
- 2024–25: Belgrade First League - Group B, 6th
Home colours	Away colours

FK Turbina Vreoci (Serbian Cyrillic: ФК Турбина Вреоци) is a football club based in Vreoci, Serbia.

They currently play in the Belgrade First League (Prva beogradska liga), a fifth-tier in Serbia's football league.

== Recent league history ==
Season	Division	P	W	D	L	F	A	Pts	Pos
2020–21	4 - Belgrade Zone League	32	11	8	13	43	45	41	9th
2021–22	5 - Belgrade First League - Group B	26	8	4	14	37	63	28	10th
2022–23	5 - Belgrade First League - Group B	26	9	3	14	47	50	30	10th
2023–24	5 - Belgrade First League - Group B	23	7	6	10	32	43	27	10th
2024–25	5 - Belgrade First League - Group B	26	16	5	5	70	33	53	6th
