= Stefan Tripković (footballer, born 1993) =

Serbian footballer

Stefan D. Tripković
Personal information
- Full name: Stefan Tripković
- Date of birth: 27 July 1993 (age 33)
- Place of birth: Trstenik, FR Yugoslavia
- Height: 1.88 m (6 ft 2 in)
- Position: Striker

Youth career
- Bežanija
- Sloga Kraljevo

Senior career*
Years	Team	Apps	(Gls)
2010–2011	Sloga Kraljevo	1	(0)
2012	Prva Petoletka	13	(1)
2013	Widnau	4	(3)
2013–2014	Tallinna Kalev	18	(7)
2014	Rad	2	(0)
2014–2015	Sloga Petrovac na Mlavi	37	(5)
2016	BSK Borča	26	(10)
2017–2018	Javor Ivanjica	24	(5)
- * Club domestic league appearances and goals as of 14 October 2017

Stefan Tripković (Serbian Cyrillic: Стефан Трипковић; born 27 July 1993) is a Serbian retired football striker.

== Career ==
He had solid performances, playing for youth categories of Sloga Kraljevo, often has been declared as a Man of the match, had one league appearance, and one league cup match for first team. Later, he left to his hometown, Trstenik, in club with same name, but within the industry of Prva Petoletka. At the beginning of 2013, he was playing for FC Widnau, Swiss lower-ranked club, where he scored 3 goals on 4 matches. Then he moved to Tallinna Kalev and, he quickly became a favorite of fans of that club. He scored 7 goals on 18 appearances.

In February 2014, he returned to Serbia and signed with Rad.

He was a member of selections under 16 and 18 years old.
