= Milan Stavrić =

Serbian footballer

Personal information
- Date of birth: 21 May 1987 (age 39)
- Place of birth: Pirot, SFR Yugoslavia
- Height: 1.86 m (6 ft 1 in)
- Position: Forward

Team information
- Current team: RB Jedlesee
- Number: 16

Senior career*
Years	Team	Apps	(Gls)
2005–2007	Radnički Pirot	0	(0)
2006–2007	→ Balkanski (loan)		
2007	Balkanski		
2007–2008	Radnički Pirot	17	(4)
2008-2009	Royal Antwerp	0	(0)
2008	→ Red Star Waasland (loan)	8	(2)
2009	→ Mechelen (loan)	0	(0)
2010	Radnički Niš	10	(1)
2010–2011	Radnički Pirot	14	(4)
2012	Slavia Sofia	4	(0)
2012	Radnički Pirot	6	(1)
2013–2014	Radnik Surdulica	37	(16)
2014–2015	Poli Timișoara	2	(0)
2015	Berane	4	(1)
2015–2016	Dinamo Vranje	32	(9)
2017	OFK Bačka	3	(0)
2017–2018	Panargiakos		
2018	KFF	6	(0)
2022	ASKÖ Ebensee	3	(0)
2022	Vienna 2016	4	(1)
2023–2024	WBC Freiheit	12	(2)
2025-	RB Jedlesee		
- * Club domestic league appearances and goals as of 31 January 2018

Milan Stavrić (born 21 May 1987) is a Serbian footballer who played as a forward for RB Jedlesee.

He had joined Romanian second-tier side Poli Timișoara from Radnik Surdulica in 2014.
