= Marko Simić (footballer, born 1993) =

Serbian footballer

Personal information
- Full name: Marko Simić
- Date of birth: 7 November 1993 (age 33)
- Place of birth: Belgrade, FR Yugoslavia
- Height: 1.84 m (6 ft 0 in)
- Position: Forward

Team information
- Current team: Kolubara

Senior career*
Years	Team	Apps	(Gls)
2011	→ Srem Jakovo (loan)	12	(4)
2012–2014	Teleoptik	23	(1)
2014	Šumadija Aranđelovac	14	(8)
2015	Kolubara	13	(4)
2015–2016	OFK Beograd	11	(1)
2016–2017	Mladost Lučani	6	(0)
2017	→ Kolubara (loan)	4	(0)
2017	Novi Pazar	11	(0)
2018	Spartaks Jūrmala	0	(0)
2018	Bežanija	18	(1)
2019	Sloboda Užice	8	(0)
2019	OFK Bačka	9	(1)
2020–2022	Kolubara	42	(4)
2022	Zemun		
2023–2024	Rudar Pljevlja	10	(0)
2024-	Kolubara		
- * Club domestic league appearances and goals as of 24 March 2024

Marko Simić (Serbian Cyrillic: Марко Симић; born 7 November 1993) is a Serbian football forward who plays for Kolubara.

== Career ==
Born in Belgrade, he played for Srem Jakovo, Teleoptik, Šumadija Aranđelovac and Kolubara. He signed with OFK Beograd in the summer of 2015.

== Career statistics ==
As of 11 June 2017

Club performance			League		Cup		Continental		Total	
Season	Club	League	Apps	Goals	Apps	Goals	Apps	Goals	Apps	Goals
2011–12	Srem Jakovo (loan)	Serbian League Belgrade	12	4	—		—		12	4
2011–12	Teleoptik	Serbian First League	9	1	—		—		9	1
2012–13	Teleoptik	Serbian First League	14	0	—		—		14	0
2014–15	Šumadija Aranđelovac	Serbian League West	14	8	—		—		14	8
2014–15	Kolubara	Serbian First League	13	4	—		—		13	4
2015–16	OFK Beograd	Serbian SuperLiga	11	1	1	1	—		12	1
2016–17	Mladost Lučani	Serbian SuperLiga	6	0	2	2	—		8	2
2016–17	Kolubara (loan)	Serbian First League	4	0	—		—		4	0
Career total			83	18	3	2	0	0	86	20
