= Bojan Jović =

Serbian footballer

Personal information
- Full name: Bojan Jović
- Date of birth: 1 April 1982 (age 44)
- Place of birth: Nova Pazova, SFR Yugoslavia
- Height: 1.94 m (6 ft 4 in)
- Position: Goalkeeper

Youth career
- Radnički Beograd

Senior career*
Years	Team	Apps	(Gls)
2001–2002	Sloven Ruma		
2003–2004	Komgrap	3	(0)
2009–2010	BSK Borča	5	(0)
2005–2008	Sloboda Tuzla	50	(0)
2008–2009	Javor Ivanjica	1	(0)
2010	Veternik	15	(0)
2011	Sarajevo	12	(0)
2011–2015	Ceahlăul Piatra Neamț	60	(0)
2015	Borac Banja Luka	10	(0)
2016	Rudar Kakanj		
2016	Zemun	0	(0)
2017–2018	Spartak Subotica	4	(0)
2018–2019	Bačka 1901		
- * Club domestic league appearances and goals

Bojan Jović (Serbian Cyrillic: Бојан Јовић; born 1 April 1982) is a Serbian retired football goalkeeper.

== Club career ==
Born in Nova Pazova, Jović began playing football in the lower levels of Serbian football. He spent three seasons in Bosnian Premier League playing for FK Rudar Prijedor, FK Sloboda Tuzla before returning to Serbia to play with FK Javor Ivanjica. He only appeared in one Serbian SuperLiga match for Javor Ivanjica during his two seasons with the club. Afterwards, he played with FK Veternik before spending a half season again in the Bosnian top league, this time with FK Sarajevo. He came to the Romanian Liga I side FC Ceahlăul Piatra Neamț in the summer of 2011. After episodes with Borac Banja Luka, Rudar Kakanj and Zemun, Jović signed a one-year-and-a-half deal with Spartak Subotica.
