= Stefan Tripković (footballer, born 1994) =

Serbian footballer

Personal information
- Full name: Stefan S. Tripković
- Date of birth: 19 September 1994 (age 32)
- Place of birth: Loznica, FR Yugoslavia
- Height: 1.88 m (6 ft 2 in)
- Position: Attacking midfielder

Team information
- Current team: Lipolist

Youth career
- Rad

Senior career*
| Years | Team | Apps | (Gls) |
| 2011–2013 | Rad | 1 | (0) |
| 2011–2012 | → Palić (loan) | 21 | (3) |
| 2012 | → BASK (loan) | 9 | (1) |
| 2013 | → Banat Zrenjanin (loan) | 16 | (1) |
| 2014–2016 | Voždovac | 12 | (1) |
| 2016–2017 | BSK Borča | 11 | (1) |
| 2017–2019 | Zvijezda 09 | 45 | (4) |
| 2019–2020 | Loznica | | |
| 2020–2021 | Mačva Šabac | 27 | (1) |
| 2021 | Mačva 1929 Bogatić | | |
| 2022 | Sloboda Užice | | |
| 2022 | Budućnost Krušik Valjevo | | |
| 2023 | Zlatibor Čajetina | | |
| 2023–2024 | Loznica | | |
| 2024 | Borac Lešnica | | |
| 2025- | Lipolist | | |

International career
| 2012 | Serbia U19 | 1 | (1) |
- * Club domestic league appearances and goals as of 18 May 2021

Stefan Tripković (Serbian Cyrillic: Стефан Трипковић; born 19 September 1994) is a Serbian football midfielder who plays for FK Lipolist.
