= 2016–17 Serbian SuperLiga =

11th season of the Serbian SuperLiga

SuperLiga
- Season: 2016–17
- Champions: Partizan; 8th SuperLiga Title; 27th domestic title
- Relegated: Metalac, Novi Pazar
- Champions League: Partizan
- Europa League: Red Star, Vojvodina, Mladost
- Matches: 296
- Goals: 718 (2.43 per match)
- Top goalscorer: Uroš Đurđević, Leonardo (24)
- Biggest home win: Red Star 5–0 Radnik Surdulica; Vojvodina 5–0 Spartak; Partizan 5–0 Mladost
- Biggest away win: Novi Pazar 0–5 Čukarički
- Highest scoring: Spartak 2–5 Novi Pazar; Čukarički 3–4 Red Star
- Longest winning run: Partizan 13 games
- Longest unbeaten run: Partizan 31 games
- Longest losing run: Borac, Novi Pazar 8 games
- Highest attendance: 41,132 (Crvena zvezda versus Partizan)
- Average attendance: 2,301

The 2016–17 Serbian SuperLiga was the eleventh season of the Serbian SuperLiga. Red Star are the defending champions. The fixtures were announced on 15 June 2016. Red Star Belgrade drew the highest average home attendance of the league (9,056).

== Teams ==
The league consisted of 16 teams: fourteen teams from the 2015–16 Serbian SuperLiga and two new teams from the 2015–16 Serbian First League. Napredak Kruševac, the 2015–16 First League champion, joined the top level two years after being relegated. Runners-up Bačka joined SuperLiga for the first time in history.

=== Stadiums and locations ===
Location of teams in the 2016–17 Serbian SuperLiga

=== Personnel and kits ===
Note: Flags indicate national team as has been defined under FIFA eligibility rules. Players and Managers may hold more than one non-FIFA nationality.

Team	Head coach	Captain	Kit manufacturer	Front shirt sponsor
OFK Bačka	(Serbia) Zoran Govedarica	(Serbia) Veseljko Trivunović	Dmag	AD Podunavlje
FK Borac Čačak	(Serbia) Milorad Kosanović	(Serbia) Zoran Kostić	NAAI	Škoda Auto
FK Čukarički	(Serbia) Nenad Lalatović	(Serbia) Igor Matić	adidas	ADOC
FK Javor Ivanjica	(Serbia) Srđan Blagojević	(Serbia) Milovan Milović	Miteks	Matis doo
FK Metalac Gornji Milanovac	(Serbia) Nenad Vanić	(Serbia) Aleksandar Ivanović	Image Sport	Metalac Group
FK Mladost Lučani	(Serbia) Nenad Milovanović	(Serbia) Ivan Milošević	Miteks	Miteks
FK Napredak Kruševac	(Serbia) Vuk Rašović	(Serbia) Jovan Markoski	Puma	—
FK Novi Pazar	(Serbia) Neško Milovanović	(Serbia) Irfan Vusljanin	Nike	Dragolovcanin
FK Partizan	(Serbia) Marko Nikolić	(Serbia) Saša Ilić	Nike	mt:s
FK Rad	(Serbia) Nebojša Petrović	(Serbia) Nikola Maraš	NAAI	Rubikon
FK Radnički Niš	(Serbia) Milan Rastavac	(Serbia) Aleksandar Jovanović	Hummel International	Niška pivara
FK Radnik Surdulica	(Bosnia and Herzegovina) Simo Krunić	(Serbia) Vladan Pavlović	Jako	—
Red Star Belgrade	(North Macedonia) Boško Đurovski	(Serbia) Aleksandar Luković	Puma	Gazprom
FK Spartak Subotica	(Russia) Andrey Chernyshov	(Serbia) Vladimir Torbica	Legea	Ždrepčeva krv
FK Vojvodina	(Serbia) Dragan Ivanović	(Serbia) Nino Pekarić	Umbro	Energotehnika Južna Bačka
FK Voždovac	(Serbia) Ilija Stolica	(Serbia) Miloš Pavlović	NAAI	Stadion SC

Nike, Inc. is the official ball supplier for Serbian SuperLiga.

=== Managerial changes ===
Team	Outgoing	Manner	Exit date		Position in table	Incoming	Incoming date		Ref.
Team	Outgoing	Manner	Announced on	Departed on	Position in table	Incoming	Announced on	Arrived on	Ref.

== Transfers ==
For the list of transfers involving SuperLiga clubs during 2016–17 season, please see: List of Serbian football transfers summer 2016 and List of Serbian football transfers winter 2016–17.

== Regular season ==
=== League table ===
Pos	Team	Pld	W	D	L	GF	GA	GD	Pts	Qualification or relegation
1	Red Star Belgrade	30	25	4	1	75	25	+50	79	Qualification for the Championship round
2	Partizan	30	23	4	3	59	17	+42	73	Qualification for the Championship round
3	Vojvodina	30	18	5	7	51	26	+25	59	Qualification for the Championship round
4	Napredak Kruševac	30	15	7	8	35	23	+12	52	Qualification for the Championship round
5	Mladost Lučani	30	14	6	10	35	29	+6	48	Qualification for the Championship round
6	Radnički Niš	30	12	8	10	37	36	+1	44	Qualification for the Championship round
7	Voždovac	30	13	4	13	35	38	−3	43	Qualification for the Championship round
8	Javor Ivanjica	30	11	9	10	32	37	−5	42	Qualification for the Championship round
9	Čukarički	30	11	7	12	40	42	−2	40	Qualification for the Relegation round
10	Spartak Subotica	30	10	8	12	38	47	−9	38	Qualification for the Relegation round
11	Rad	30	9	8	13	26	37	−11	35	Qualification for the Relegation round
12	Bačka	30	8	3	19	17	37	−20	27	Qualification for the Relegation round
13	Metalac	30	6	9	15	20	34	−14	27	Qualification for the Relegation round
14	Radnik Surdulica	30	6	7	17	24	42	−18	25	Qualification for the Relegation round
15	Novi Pazar	30	5	5	20	22	53	−31	20	Qualification for the Relegation round
16	Borac Čačak	30	4	6	20	22	45	−23	18	Qualification for the Relegation round

Source: UEFA, Soccerway
Rules for classification: 1) Points; 2) Head-to-head points; 3) Head-to-head goal difference; 4) Head-to-head goals scored; 5) Head-to-head away goals scored (if two teams tied); 6) Goal difference; 7) Goals scored; 8) Fairplay ranking; 9) Draw.

=== Results ===
Each of the 16 competitors in the SuperLiga hosts every other team once in the regular season, for a total of 30 matches.

Home \ Away	BBP	BOR	ČUK	JAV	MET	MLA	NAP	NPZ	PAR	RAD	RNI	RSU	RSB	SPA	VOJ	VŽD
Bačka		1–0	3–1	0–1	1–0	1–0	1–3	1–0	0–0	2–0	1–2	0–2	0–3	1–3	0–1	2–1
Borac Čačak	1–0		2–3	1–1	1–2	0–1	0–1	2–1	0–2	0–1	0–0	1–0	0–1	3–3	0–1	1–2
Čukarički	1–0	1–1		2–1	2–1	1–1	1–0	2–0	1–3	1–1	4–1	0–0	3–4	2–4	1–3	2–1
Javor Ivanjica	2–0	2–0	0–0		1–0	1–1	1–0	1–1	0–2	1–1	2–0	1–0	2–4	2–3	2–1	0–1
Metalac	0–1	1–0	0–3	1–1		2–0	2–0	0–0	0–1	1–2	1–2	3–1	1–2	0–0	0–3	0–2
Mladost Lučani	1–0	3–0	2–0	1–0	1–1		1–0	0–1	0–2	2–1	1–0	2–0	2–4	4–1	2–0	0–1
Napredak Kruševac	2–0	3–1	2–1	3–1	1–0	0–0		3–0	2–1	2–0	1–2	2–1	0–1	1–0	0–0	0–0
Novi Pazar	1–1	0–2	1–0	1–2	0–0	1–2	0–1		1–3	0–2	1–0	1–0	1–4	2–4	1–2	0–1
Partizan	1–0	2–1	1–0	2–0	3–0	3–1	3–2	4–0		4–0	1–1	2–1	1–0	2–0	1–3	4–0
Rad	2–1	2–0	1–1	1–1	1–1	1–2	0–1	2–0	0–1		1–1	1–0	0–4	2–0	0–0	0–2
Radnički Niš	1–0	3–3	2–1	0–1	1–1	2–0	1–1	2–2	0–2	3–0		1–0	0–3	0–1	1–0	2–0
Radnik Surdulica	1–0	1–1	1–1	2–2	0–1	1–1	0–1	3–1	1–3	1–0	1–2		1–2	2–1	0–0	3–1
Red Star Belgrade	2–0	2–0	3–1	3–0	3–1	2–2	2–2	2–0	1–1	2–1	2–1	5–0		2–1	4–1	3–0
Spartak Subotica	0–0	1–0	0–1	1–1	0–0	1–0	1–1	2–5	2–1	0–1	3–1	1–1	1–1		1–4	0–2
Vojvodina	1–0	2–1	2–0	4–0	1–0	0–1	2–0	3–0	0–0	3–2	1–1	2–0	2–3	5–0		3–1
Voždovac	4–0	2–0	1–3	1–2	0–0	2–1	0–0	2–0	0–3	0–0	1–4	3–0	0–1	0–3	4–1	

Legend: Blue = home team win; Yellow = draw; Red = away team win.

== Play-offs ==
=== Championship round ===
The top eight teams advance from the regular season. Points from the regular season are halved with half points rounded up. Teams play each other once.

==== League table ====
Pos	Team	Pld	W	D	L	GF	GA	GD	Pts	Qualification
1	Partizan (C)	37	30	4	3	78	22	+56	58	Qualification for the Champions League second qualifying round
2	Red Star Belgrade	37	30	4	3	93	33	+60	55	Qualification for the Europa League first qualifying round (Note: Since the winners of the 2016–17 Serbian Cup, Partizan, qualified for European competition based on league position, the spot awarded to the cup winners (Europa League first qualifying round) was passed to the fourth-placed team.)
3	Vojvodina	37	22	6	9	58	31	+27	43	Qualification for the Europa League first qualifying round
4	Mladost Lučani	37	18	6	13	46	44	+2	36	Qualification for the Europa League first qualifying round
5	Radnički Niš	37	15	9	13	47	46	+1	32	
6	Napredak Kruševac	37	16	8	13	44	36	+8	30	
7	Voždovac	37	14	6	17	41	51	−10	27	
8	Javor Ivanjica	37	11	10	16	34	50	−16	22	

Source: UEFA, Soccereway
Rules for classification: 1) Points; 1) Points in regular season; 2) Head-to-head points in regular season; 3) Head-to-head goal difference in regular season; 4) Head-to-head goals scored in regular season; 5) Head-to-head away goals scored in regular season (if two teams tied); 6) Goal difference; 7) Goals scored; 8) Fairplay ranking; 9) Play-off (if two teams tied and need to decide champion or teams for UEFA competitions); 10) Draw.
(C) Champions

=== Relegation round ===
The bottom eight teams from the regular season play in the relegation round. Points from the regular season are halved with half points rounded up. Teams play each other once.

==== League table ====
Pos	Team	Pld	W	D	L	GF	GA	GD	Pts	Relegation
9	Čukarički	37	15	7	15	54	49	+5	32	
10	Spartak Subotica	37	14	9	14	47	55	−8	32	
11	Rad	37	11	9	17	29	45	−16	25	
12	Radnik Surdulica	37	9	10	18	35	48	−13	25	
13	Bačka	37	11	3	23	27	46	−19	23	
14	Borac Čačak	37	8	7	22	29	51	−22	22	
15	Metalac (R)	37	8	10	19	27	43	−16	21	Relegation to the Serbian First League
16	Novi Pazar (R)	37	7	6	24	29	68	−39	17	Relegation to the Serbian First League

Source: UEFA, Soccerway
Rules for classification: 1) Points; 1) Points in regular season; 2) Head-to-head points in regular season; 3) Head-to-head goal difference in regular season; 4) Head-to-head goals scored in regular season; 5) Head-to-head away goals scored in regular season (if two teams tied); 6) Goal difference; 7) Goals scored; 8) Fairplay ranking; 9) Play-off (if two teams tied and need to decide relegsation); 10) Draw.
(R) Relegated

== Individual statistics ==
=== Top scorers ===
As of matches played on 21 May 2017.

Pos	Scorer	Team	Goals
1	(Serbia) Uroš Đurđević	Partizan	24
1	(Brazil) Leonardo	Partizan	24
3	(Serbia) Milan Bojović	Mladost	16
3	(Serbia) Filip Malbašić	Vojvodina	16
3	(Serbia) Ognjen Mudrinski	Spartak	16
3	(Serbia) Ognjen Ožegović	Čukarički	16

=== Hat-tricks ===
Player	For	Against	Result	Date
(Serbia) Aleksandar Jevtić	Čukarički	Radnički Niš	4–1	19 November 2016
(Serbia) Ognjen Mudrinski	Spartak	Novi Pazar	2–4	4 December 2016
(Serbia) Uroš Đurđević	Partizan	Čukarički	1–3	11 December 2016
(Serbia) Milan Bojović	Mladost Lučani	Napredak Kruševac	3–2	17 May 2017
(Serbia) Ognjen Ožegović	Novi Pazar	Čukarički	0–5	17 May 2017
(Ghana) Richmond Boakye	Red Star	Radnički Niš	4–0	21 May 2017

=== Player of the week ===
Round	Player	Club	Goals	Assist
1	(Serbia) Darko Bjedov	Javor	2	0
2	(Serbia) Josip Projić	Napredak	1	0
3	(Serbia) Dejan Georgijević	Voždovac	2	0
4	(Serbia) Enver Alivodić	Novi Pazar	2	1
5	(Serbia) Aleksandar Katai	Red Star	2	0
6	(Serbia) Aleksandar Paločević	Vojvodina	2	0
7	(Brazil) Leonardo	Partizan	1	1
8	(Serbia) Milan Pavkov	Radnički	2	0
9	(Serbia) Ognjen Mudrinski	Spartak	1	2
10	(Costa Rica) John Ruiz	Red Star	1	1
11	(Brazil) Leonardo (2)	Partizan	1	1
12	(Serbia) Dušan Anđelković	Red Star	0	2
13	(Serbia) Bogdan Mladenović	Rad	2	0
14	(Senegal) Ibrahima N'Diaye	Napredak	2	1
15	(Serbia) Marko Docić	Čukarički	2	0
16	(Serbia) Aleksandar Jevtić	Čukarički	3	0
17	(Serbia) Milan Bojović	Mladost	2	0
18	(Serbia) Stefan Dražić	Voždovac	1	1
19	(Serbia) Ognjen Mudrinski (2)	Spartak	3	1
20	(Serbia) Uroš Đurđević	Partizan	3	0
21	(Brazil) Leonardo (3)	Partizan	2	0
22	(Serbia) Nemanja Krznarić	Mladost	0	0
23	(Serbia) Filip Malbašić	Vojvodina	1	2
24	(Serbia) Saša Stojanović	Radnički Niš	2	0
25	(Serbia) Nemanja Kojić	Radnički Niš	1	1
26	(Serbia) Petar Bojić	Čukarički	2	0
27	(Ghana) Richmond Boakye	Red Star	2	1
28	(Serbia) Srđan Vujaklija	Red Star	2	0
29	(Serbia) Stefan Dražić (2)	Voždovac	1	0
30	(Serbia) Ognjen Ožegović	Čukarički	2	0
31	(Brazil) Leonardo (4)	Partizan	2	0
32	(Serbia) Ivan Marković	Novi Pazar	2	0
33	(Brazil) Leonardo (5)	Partizan	1	1
34	(Serbia) Zoran Popović	Voždovac	0	0
35	(Serbia) Mihailo Ristić	Red Star	1	1
36	(Serbia) Ognjen Ožegović (2)	Čukarički	3	1
37	(Ghana) Richmond Boakye (2)	Red Star	3	0

== Awards ==
=== Team of the Season ===

Serbian SuperLiga Team of the Year

Position	Player	Team
GK	(Serbia) Zoran Popović	Voždovac
RB	(Serbia) Miroslav Vulićević	Partizan
CB	(Serbia) Bogdan Planić	Vojvodina
CB	(Serbia) Bojan Ostojić	Partizan
LB	(Serbia) Dušan Anđelković	Red Star
RM	(Serbia) Filip Malbašić	Vojvodina
CM	(Brazil) Everton Luiz	Partizan
CM	(Netherlands) Mitchell Donald	Red Star
LM	(Brazil) Leonardo	Partizan
AM	(Serbia) Aleksandar Paločević	Vojvodina
FW	(Serbia) Uroš Đurđević	Partizan

=== Player of the season ===
- (Serbia) Uroš Đurđević (Partizan)

=== Coach of the season ===
- (Serbia) Marko Nikolić (Partizan)
