= List of Serbian football transfers winter 2017–18 =

- This is a list of transfers in Serbian football for the 2017–18 winter transfer window.
- Moves featuring Serbian SuperLiga and Serbian First League sides are listed.
- The order by which the clubs are listed is equal to the classifications at the end of the first part of the 2017–18 season.

== Serbian SuperLiga ==
=== Red Star Belgrade ===
In: Note: Flags indicate national team as defined under FIFA eligibility rules; some limited exceptions apply. Players may hold more than one non-FIFA nationality.

No.	Pos.	Nation	Player
—	FW	SRB	Aleksandar Bogdanović (loan return from Grafičar Beograd)
31	FW	COM	Ben Nabouhane (from (Greece) Olympiacos)
34	DF	SRB	Stefan Hajdin (from Spartak Subotica)
15	DF	SRB	Srđan Babić (was on loan, now signed from (Spain) Real Sociedad)
—	MF	SRB	Miodrag Maljković (from Vojvodina, to youth team)

Out: Note: Flags indicate national team as defined under FIFA eligibility rules; some limited exceptions apply. Players may hold more than one non-FIFA nationality.

No.	Pos.	Nation	Player
—	FW	ISL	Đorđe Panić (to (Iceland) KR, was on loan at Grafičar Beograd)
89	MF	BRA	Ricardinho (to (Russia) Tosno)
—	DF	SRB	Miloš Stojanović (to Voždovac, was on loan at Sinđelić Beograd)
21	MF	SRB	Filip Bainović (on loan to Rad)
44	DF	BRA	Zé Marcos (on loan to Rad)
8	MF	GAB	Guelor Kanga (to (Czech Republic) Sparta Prague)
—	DF	SRB	Stefan Milošević (to Spartak Subotica)
98	FW	SRB	Vanja Vučićević (on loan to Spartak Subotica, was on loan at Borac Čačak)
19	MF	SRB	Veljko Nikolić (on loan to Grafičar Beograd)
24	DF	SRB	Slađan Rakić (on loan to Grafičar Beograd)
73	FW	SRB	Jug Stanojev (on loan to Grafičar Beograd)
93	DF	SRB	Aleksa Terzić (on loan to Grafičar Beograd)
32	GK	SRB	Aleksandar Stanković (loan extension to Grafičar Beograd)
—	MF	SRB	Stefan Cvetković (loan extension to Grafičar Beograd)
—	FW	MKD	Darko Grozdanoski (to Prva Iskra, was on loan at Žarkovo)
—	MF	BIH	Stefan Kovač (on loan to IMT)
—	MF	SRB	Viktor Živojinović (loan extension to Grafičar Beograd)
—	FW	SRB	Stefan Vudragović (loan extension to Grafičar Beograd)
—	MF	SRB	Blagota Marković (loan extension to Grafičar Beograd)
—	MF	SRB	Miloš Z. Nikolić (loan extension to Grafičar Beograd)
—	MF	SRB	Andrija Crnadak (loan extension to Grafičar Beograd)
—	MF	SRB	Nikola Puzić (loan extension to Grafičar Beograd)
—	GK	SRB	Ilija Ćatić (loan extension to Grafičar Beograd)
—	DF	SRB	Marko Konatar (loan extension to Grafičar Beograd)
—	MF	BIH	Jovan Ilić (loan extension to Grafičar Beograd)
—	FW	SRB	Milan Senić (on loan to Grafičar Beograd, was on loan at (Hungary) Siófok)
14	FW	GHA	Richmond Boakye (to (China) Jiangsu Suning)
29	DF	BRA	Mateus Viveiros (released, was on loan at Bežanija)

=== Partizan ===
In: Note: Flags indicate national team as defined under FIFA eligibility rules; some limited exceptions apply. Players may hold more than one non-FIFA nationality.

No.	Pos.	Nation	Player
8	FW	SRB	Vladimir Đilas (loan return from Teleoptik)
72	DF	SRB	Slobodan Urošević (from Napredak Kruševac)
18	FW	SRB	Đorđe Ivanović (from Spartak Subotica)
14	MF	UKR	Yuriy Vakulko (from (Ukraine) Dnipro)
16	MF	SRB	Saša Zdjelar (on loan from (Greece) Olympiacos)
34	MF	BFA	Dramane Salou (from (Burkina Faso) Salitas)
41	GK	SRB	Aleksandar Popović (loan return from Teleoptik)
2	DF	SRB	Luka Cucin (loan return from Teleoptik)
90	FW	SRB	Strahinja Jovanović (loan return from Teleoptik)
—	MF	SRB	Lazar Vujanić (loan return from Teleoptik)
—	MF	SRB	Luka Karas (from Radnički Sombor, to youth team)

Out: Note: Flags indicate national team as defined under FIFA eligibility rules; some limited exceptions apply. Players may hold more than one non-FIFA nationality.

No.	Pos.	Nation	Player
9	FW	SRB	Dušan Vlahović (loan return to (Italy) Fiorentina)
13	DF	LBA	Mohamed El Monir (to (United States) Orlando City)
91	MF	SRB	Alen Stevanović (to (Japan) Shonan Bellmare)
12	GK	SRB	Filip Kljajić (on loan to (Greece) Platanias)
11	MF	SRB	Petar Đuričković (to (Greece) Xanthi)
—	DF	SRB	Stefan Grbović (to (Slovenia) Brda, was on loan at Teleoptik)
25	MF	BRA	Everton Luiz (to (Italy) SPAL)
6	DF	SRB	Lazar Ćirković (to (Switzerland) Luzern)
77	FW	NGR	Theophilus Solomon (loan return to (Croatia) Rijeka)
85	GK	SRB	Nemanja Stevanović (on loan to Rad, was on loan at Teleoptik)
30	MF	SRB	Veljko Birmančević (on loan to Rad, was on loan at Teleoptik)
—	GK	BIH	Igor Marković (to (Bosnia and Herzegovina) Sloboda Tuzla)
1	GK	SRB	Đorđe Lazović (to Radnički Niš)
—	DF	BIH	Marko Čubrilo (to Radnik Surdulica, was on loan at Teleoptik)
—	DF	SRB	Jovan Vlalukin (on loan to Teleoptik)
17	MF	SRB	Saša Marjanović (to (Kazakhstan) Aktobe)
37	FW	SRB	Miloš Kukolj (on loan to Budućnost Dobanovci, was on loan at Dinamo Pančevo)
—	GK	SRB	Goran Buljundarić (to Sinđelić Beograd)
—	MF	SRB	Arton Zekaj (to Sopot)
—		SRB	Dragan Čubra (on loan to Teleoptik, previously brought from TSC)
—	DF	SRB	Zlatan Šehović (on loan to Teleoptik)
—	MF	BIH	Filip Božić (to Mačva Šabac)
—	MF	SRB	Ljubodrag Tomović (on loan to Spartak Subotica)
—	DF	SRB	Nikola Mirić (on loan to Teleoptik, previously brought from Vojvodina)
29	MF	SRB	Milan Radin (to (Kazakhstan) Aktobe)

=== Spartak Subotica ===
In: Note: Flags indicate national team as defined under FIFA eligibility rules; some limited exceptions apply. Players may hold more than one non-FIFA nationality.

No.	Pos.	Nation	Player
25	GK	SRB	Ivan Dokić (loan return from Bačka 1901)
—		SRB	Mateja Nenadović (loan return from Bačka 1901)
—		SRB	Risto Ristić (loan return from Potisje Kanjiža)
—	FW	SRB	Goran Kozomora (loan return from Potisje Kanjiža)
28	FW	SRB	Ognjen Đuričin (from Bečej)
6	DF	SRB	Nemanja Tekijaški (from Železničar Pančevo)
24	FW	SRB	Vanja Vučićević (on loan from Red Star Belgrade)
35	MF	SEN	Cheikhou Dieng (on loan from (Turkey) İstanbul Başakşehir)
96	GK	SRB	Ivan Lučić (from Bačka BP)
10	DF	SRB	Stefan Milošević (from Red Star Belgrade)
26	FW	MNE	Filip Vorotović (from Borac Čačak)
66	DF	MNE	Nikola Popović (from (Montenegro) Čelik Nikšić)
—	MF	SRB	Ljubodrag Tomović (on loan from Partizan, to youth team)
—		SRB	Marko Stojak (on loan from Vojvodina, to youth team)
33	MF	ECU	Jainer Medina (from (Ecuador) Ciudadelas del Norte)

Out: Note: Flags indicate national team as defined under FIFA eligibility rules; some limited exceptions apply. Players may hold more than one non-FIFA nationality.

No.	Pos.	Nation	Player
11	MF	MNE	Andjelo Rudović (to (Montenegro) Kom)
28	FW	MKD	Emil Abaz (to (Belgium) Beerschot Wilrijk)
14	DF	SRB	Stefan Hajdin (to Red Star Belgrade)
66	DF	SRB	Aleksandar Radovanović (to Vojvodina)
10	FW	SRB	Đorđe Ivanović (to Partizan)
—	FW	SRB	Milan Đokić (was on loan, now signed with Moravac Mrštane)
—	DF	SRB	Bojan Bjelobrk (to Bačka 1901, was on loan at Potisje Kanjiža)
27	DF	SRB	Dimitrije Tomović (on loan to Proleter Novi Sad, was on loan at Bačka 1901)
—	FW	SRB	Marko Varga (loan extension to Indeks Novi Sad)
—	FW	SRB	Aleksa Stjepanović (on loan to SFS Borac Paraćin)
—		SRB	Nemanja Tomić (loan extension to Sloga Temerin)
20	FW	SRB	Bogdan Stamenković (loan extension to Bratstvo Prigrevica)
16	MF	SRB	Marko Pantić (on loan to ČSK Čelarevo)
—	MF	SRB	Kristijan Poturica (on loan to Bačka Pačir, was on loan at Potisje Kanjiža)
2	DF	SRB	Boško Gajić (on loan to Inđija, was on loan at Omladinac Novi Banovci)
—	DF	SRB	Luka Đurović (on loan to OFK Odžaci, was on loan at Bačka 1901)
13	FW	SRB	Igor Antunić (on loan to Bačka 1901, was on loan at Bratstvo Prigrevica)
—	GK	SRB	Dino Žužo (on loan to Bačka 1901)
—		SRB	Strahinja Lukić (on loan to Bačka 1901)
17	MF	SRB	Milivoj Krmar (loan extension to Bačka 1901)
22	MF	SRB	Predrag Medić (loan extension to Bačka 1901)
—		SRB	Mihailo Mihailović (loan extension to Bačka 1901)

=== Radnički Niš ===
In: Note: Flags indicate national team as defined under FIFA eligibility rules; some limited exceptions apply. Players may hold more than one non-FIFA nationality.

No.	Pos.	Nation	Player
—	DF	SRB	Srđan Marinković (loan return from Sinđelić Niš)
—	FW	SRB	Mladen Radenković (loan return from Radnički Pirot)
30	FW	SRB	Siniša Babić (from (Greece) AEL)
23	MF	SRB	Dušan Mićić (from Radnik Surdulica)
44	DF	SRB	Radoš Bulatović (from Radnik Surdulica)
50	GK	SRB	Bojan Šaranov (from Zemun)
11	MF	SRB	Aleksandar Stanisavljević (from (Greece) Asteras Tripolis)
31	MF	SRB	Dušan Lalatović (from Budućnost Gložan)
41	GK	SRB	Đorđe Lazović (from Partizan)

Out: Note: Flags indicate national team as defined under FIFA eligibility rules; some limited exceptions apply. Players may hold more than one non-FIFA nationality.

No.	Pos.	Nation	Player
6	MF	SRB	Marko Tomić (to (Lithuania) Žalgiris)
12	GK	SRB	Bojan Brać (to OFK Odžaci)
84	GK	SRB	Nemanja Krznarić (to Mladost Lučani)
15	DF	SRB	Nikola Raspopović (to (Belarus) Shakhtyor Soligorsk)
—	MF	SRB	Saša Domić (to Žarkovo, was on loan at Dunav Prahovo)
20	MF	SRB	Dušan Živković (released)
—	MF	SRB	Đorđe Stanković (to Real Niš, was on loan at Car Konstantin)
11	MF	SRB	Lazar Arsić (to Vojvodina)
—	FW	SRB	Amir Zeka (loan extension to Rudar Alpos)
75	FW	SRB	Lazar Ranđelović (loan extension to Dinamo Vranje)
—	DF	SRB	Petar Bogdanović (loan extension to Timok)
18	MF	SRB	Nikola Kovačević (to (Latvia) Spartaks Jūrmala)
23	FW	SRB	Milutin Ivanović (to Car Konstantin)
69	MF	SRB	Marko Listeš (on loan to Car Konstantin, was on loan at Sinđelić Niš)
—	DF	SRB	Jovan Trojanović (to Sinđelić Niš)
—	FW	SRB	Marko Branković (was on loan, now signed with Sinđelić Niš)
—	MF	SRB	Ilija Stojančić (to Grafičar Beograd)

=== Čukarički ===
In: Note: Flags indicate national team as defined under FIFA eligibility rules; some limited exceptions apply. Players may hold more than one non-FIFA nationality.

No.	Pos.	Nation	Player
9	FW	CIV	Ismaël Béko Fofana (loan return from (Kazakhstan) Irtysh Pavlodar)
6	DF	SRB	Miladin Stevanović (free, last with (Turkey) Kayserispor)
77	DF	SRB	Zoran Rendulić (from Rad)
11	MF	SRB	Petar Milić (from (France) SCO Angers)
27	MF	SRB	Nemanja Belaković (from (Croatia) Novigrad)
22	MF	SRB	Luka Stojanović (from (Cyprus) Apollon Limassol)
65	MF	SRB	Stefan Šapić (loan return from Sinđelić Beograd)
—	GK	SRB	Aleksandar Knežević (on loan from Radnički Kovači, to youth team)

Out: Note: Flags indicate national team as defined under FIFA eligibility rules; some limited exceptions apply. Players may hold more than one non-FIFA nationality.

No.	Pos.	Nation	Player
22	DF	BIH	Petar Jovanović (to Mladost Lučani)
77	DF	MNE	Lazar Đokić (to Metalac G. M.)
4	DF	SRB	Đorđe Crnomarković (to Javor Ivanjica)
88	MF	SRB	Nenad Adamović (to (Belarus) Vitebsk)
11	MF	SRB	Saša Jovanović (to (Austria) Wolfsberger AC)
44	MF	MNE	Dušan Lagator (on loan to (Russia) Dynamo Saint Petersburg)
18	MF	SRB	Petar Mićin (to (Italy) Udinese)
—	FW	SRB	Predrag Jovanović (released, was on loan at BASK)
—	MF	SRB	Aleksandar Đorđević (on loan to IMT)
—	DF	SRB	Đorđe Šošević (on loan to IMT)
58	FW	SRB	Marko Šarić (on loan to IMT)
25	FW	SRB	Luka Ristivojević (on loan to Zlatibor Čajetina)
—	FW	BIH	Danko Radić (to Inđija)
33	FW	SRB	Luka Marković (to (Italy) Crotone)
35	GK	SRB	Damjan Knežević (to Mladost Lučani)

=== Voždovac ===
In: Note: Flags indicate national team as defined under FIFA eligibility rules; some limited exceptions apply. Players may hold more than one non-FIFA nationality.

No.	Pos.	Nation	Player
4	DF	SRB	Marko Mirkailo (from Jagodina)
19	DF	MNE	Darko Bulatović (from (Iceland) KA)
17	DF	SRB	Miloš Stojanović (from Red Star Belgrade)
3	DF	SRB	Nemanja Zlatković (from (Sweden) Ängelholms FF)
9	FW	SRB	Marko Pavićević (from (Greece) Rodos)
7	FW	SRB	Miloš Stanković (from Radnik Surdulica)
41	DF	SRB	Mihailo Jovanović (from (Czech Republic) Zbrojovka Brno)
1	GK	SRB	Stefan Čupić (from (Norway) Sarpsborg 08)
8	MF	BIH	Zoran Milutinović (from (Bosnia and Herzegovina) Krupa)
33	FW	SWE	Andrej Simeunović (from (Sweden) Lunds BK)
—	MF	SRB	David Bajić (from Inđija, to youth team)
—	MF	SRB	Luka Gojković (on loan from BSK Borča, to youth team)
—	GK	SRB	Luka Lošić (from (Germany) Wehen Wiesbaden, to youth team)

Out: Note: Flags indicate national team as defined under FIFA eligibility rules; some limited exceptions apply. Players may hold more than one non-FIFA nationality.

No.	Pos.	Nation	Player
—	MF	SRB	Vuk Vujisić (to Sloga Kraljevo)
4	DF	SRB	Saša Ivković (to (Slovenia) Maribor)
17	DF	SRB	Marko Putinčanin (to Vojvodina)
—	MF	SRB	Stefan Mihajlović (to Mladost Lučani)
10	MF	SRB	Đuro Zec (to Napredak Kruševac)
7	FW	SRB	Dejan Georgijević (to (Hungary) Ferencváros)
2	DF	SRB	Aleksandar Filipović (to (Belarus) BATE Borisov)
1	GK	SRB	Zoran Popović (to (Norway) Bodø/Glimt)
—	FW	SRB	Bogdan Mandić (to Sinđelić Beograd, was on loan at BSK Borča)
—		SRB	Uroš Vuković (on loan to GSP Polet Dorćol)
—	MF	SRB	Radovan Avram (on loan to GSP Polet Dorćol)
—	DF	SRB	Filip Damjanović (loan extension to IMT)
24	MF	SRB	Stefan Purtić (on loan to Radnički Obrenovac)
28	MF	SRB	Jovica Blagojević (on loan to Radnički Obrenovac)
—	FW	MNE	Dejan Račić (on loan to (Montenegro) Iskra Danilovgrad, was on loan at BSK Borča)
—	FW	SRB	Luka Marković (to Grafičar Beograd)

=== Napredak Kruševac ===
In: Note: Flags indicate national team as defined under FIFA eligibility rules; some limited exceptions apply. Players may hold more than one non-FIFA nationality.

No.	Pos.	Nation	Player
99	FW	SRB	Milan Basrak (from (Albania) Partizani Tirana)
90	FW	MNE	Stefan Nikolić (from (Romania) Sepsi Sfântu Gheorghe)
2	MF	SRB	Miroljub Kostić (from Borac Čačak)
22	FW	SRB	Anes Rušević (from (Belarus) BATE Borisov)
84	DF	SRB	Miloš Ostojić (free, last with (Belarus) BATE Borisov)
72	FW	SEN	Ibrahima Mame N'Diaye (from (Denmark) Randers)
20	MF	SRB	Đuro Zec (from Voždovac)

Out: Note: Flags indicate national team as defined under FIFA eligibility rules; some limited exceptions apply. Players may hold more than one non-FIFA nationality.

No.	Pos.	Nation	Player
94	GK	SRB	Lazar Tatić (released)
14	MF	SRB	Nikola Mitrović (to (Poland) Wisła Kraków)
69	FW	BIH	Uroš Đerić (to (South Korea) Gangwon)
84	MF	SRB	Enver Alivodić (to (Greece) Apollon Smyrnis)
27	DF	SRB	Slobodan Urošević (to Partizan)
99	FW	MNE	Filip Kasalica (to (Greece) Platanias)
—	MF	SRB	Filip Gogić (was on loan, now signed with Trayal)
—	DF	SRB	Filip Đurović (was on loan, now signed with Trayal)
—	FW	SRB	Nikola Palurović (to Moravac Mrštane, was on loan at Jedinstvo Paraćin)
79	FW	SRB	Andrija Majdevac (to Inđija, was on loan at Temnić)
66	MF	SRB	Marko Stanojević (loan extension to Temnić)
—	DF	SRB	Nikola Radmanovac (on loan to Trayal, was on loan at Bežanija)
77	FW	SRB	Filip Bajić (to Bačka BP)
31	MF	SRB	Luka Marković (on loan to Jedinstvo Paraćin, was on loan at Trayal)
—	GK	SRB	Mattia Miljojković (to Radnički Kovači)

=== Vojvodina ===
In: Note: Flags indicate national team as defined under FIFA eligibility rules; some limited exceptions apply. Players may hold more than one non-FIFA nationality.

No.	Pos.	Nation	Player
98	FW	SRB	Nikola Gajić (loan return from Cement Beočin)
93	FW	NGR	Eze Okeuhie (from Metalac G. M.)
77	DF	SRB	Marko Putinčanin (from Voždovac)
66	DF	SRB	Aleksandar Radovanović (from Spartak Subotica)
10	MF	SRB	Lazar Arsić (from Radnički Niš)

Out: Note: Flags indicate national team as defined under FIFA eligibility rules; some limited exceptions apply. Players may hold more than one non-FIFA nationality.

No.	Pos.	Nation	Player
24	MF	BIH	Ognjen Đelmić (to (Bosnia and Herzegovina) Čelik Zenica)
66	DF	GHA	Joseph Bempah (to (Mexico) Murciélagos)
—	FW	GHA	Francis Afriyie (to (Mexico) Murciélagos)
6	DF	BRA	Renan (to (Mexico) Murciélagos)
—	FW	SRB	Milan Bubalo (to (Thailand) Udon Thani)
—	DF	BIH	Bojan Batar (to (Bosnia and Herzegovina) BSK Banja Luka)
27	DF	BIH	Dženan Bureković (to (Hungary) Újpest)
—	DF	BIH	Marko Bogojević (released, was on loan at Radnički Šid)
22	FW	SRB	Ivica Jovanović (to Timok)
4	DF	SRB	Filip Babić (to TSC)
10	MF	MNE	Damir Kojašević (to (Kazakhstan) Shakhter Karagandy)
3	DF	SRB	Mladen Devetak (on loan to ČSK Čelarevo)
11	MF	SRB	Kristijan Živković (on loan to ČSK Čelarevo)
34	FW	SRB	Miloš Zličić (on loan to ČSK Čelarevo)
40	GK	SRB	Vukašin Pilipović (on loan to ČSK Čelarevo)
—	FW	SRB	Milan Mirosavljev (was on loan, now signed with Proleter Novi Sad)
—	MF	SRB	Srđan Šćepanović (was on loan, now signed with Proleter Novi Sad)
—	GK	ESP	Marko Cicović (to Sloboda Užice)
—	MF	SRB	Luka Sinđić (on loan to ČSK Čelarevo, previously brought from (Israel) Maccabi Herzliya)
—	FW	SRB	Marko Stojak (on loan to Spartak Subotica)
—	DF	SRB	Nikola Mirić (to Partizan)
—	FW	DEN	Adda Djeziri (to (Laos) Luangprabang United)
15	FW	KOR	Park In-hyeok (loan return to (Germany) TSG Hoffenheim)
—	MF	SRB	Miodrag Maljković (to Red Star Belgrade)
—	MF	SRB	Ivan Tadić (to Kabel)

=== Mladost Lučani ===
In: Note: Flags indicate national team as defined under FIFA eligibility rules; some limited exceptions apply. Players may hold more than one non-FIFA nationality.

No.	Pos.	Nation	Player
7	MF	SRB	Stefan Dimić (from Zemun)
10	MF	SRB	Đorđe Lazić (free, last with (Greece) Xanthi)
5	DF	BIH	Petar Jovanović (from Čukarički)
32	MF	SRB	Danko Kiković (from Javor Ivanjica)
24	FW	SEN	Badara Badji (free, last with (India) Delhi Dynamos)
1	GK	SRB	Nemanja Krznarić (from Radnički Niš)
9	FW	SRB	Igor Savić (from Borac Čačak)
40	MF	SRB	Stefan Mihajlović (from Voždovac)
20	FW	SRB	Lazar Jovanović (from Borac Čačak)
—	GK	SRB	Damjan Knežević (from Čukarički)

Out: Note: Flags indicate national team as defined under FIFA eligibility rules; some limited exceptions apply. Players may hold more than one non-FIFA nationality.

No.	Pos.	Nation	Player
20	MF	SRB	Nenad Marinković (to Rad)
10	MF	UZB	Husniddin Gafurov (to (Uzbekistan) Lokomotiv Tashkent)
1	GK	SRB	Nikola Petrić (to (Sweden) Brommapojkarna)
32	FW	SRB	Ivan Marković (to Javor Ivanjica)
—	MF	SRB	Srđan Todorović (on loan to BASK, previously brought from the same club)
9	FW	MNE	Nikola Zvrko (to Bačka BP)
98	MF	SRB	Zehrudin Mehmedović (to BASK)
99	MF	SRB	Veljko Kijevčanin (to LFK Mladost Lučani)
—	DF	SRB	Lazar Stojanović (to LFK Mladost Lučani)
—		SRB	Lazar Selenić (to LFK Mladost Lučani)
16	MF	SRB	Nikola Cuckić (to Zemun)
—	MF	SRB	Matija Protić (to Dragačevo Guča, was on loan at Sloga Požega)
—	FW	SRB	Kristijan Đurđević (on loan to Radnički Obrenovac, previously brought from Dorćol)
—	FW	SRB	Đorđe Babić (on loan to Sloboda Užice, previously brought from the same club)
—		SRB	Đorđe Nešovanović (was on loan, now signed with Ovčar Markovica)
—		SRB	Nikola Nešovanović (to Jedinstvo Puhovo, was on loan at Ovčar Markovica)
58	DF	SRB	Miloš Ristić (loan extension to Sloga Požega)
—	FW	SRB	Marko Kilibarda (on loan to Sloga Požega, previously brought from BASK)
—	DF	SRB	Marko Jevremović (on loan to Sloga Požega, previously brought from Radnički Obrenovac)
—		SRB	Luka Stjepanović (to LFK Mladost Lučani)

=== Radnik Surdulica ===
In: Note: Flags indicate national team as defined under FIFA eligibility rules; some limited exceptions apply. Players may hold more than one non-FIFA nationality.

No.	Pos.	Nation	Player
8	FW	SRB	Milan Stojanović (loan return from Car Konstantin)
14	MF	SRB	Risto Ristović (from (Montenegro) Budućnost Podgorica)
4	DF	SRB	Dragan Žarković (from (Iran) Gostaresh Foulad)
16	FW	SRB	Jovan Jovanović (loan return from Novi Pazar)
25	FW	SRB	Krsta Đorđević (from (Czech Republic) Olympia Prague)
19	FW	SRB	Vladimir Stefanović (from Moravac Mrštane)
24	MF	SRB	Vuk Mitošević (from Javor Ivanjica)
22	GK	SRB	Milovan Lekić (from Bežanija)
15	MF	SRB	Dragomir Vukobratović (free, last with (Poland) Górnik Łęczna)
23	MF	SRB	Pavle Propadalo (from Borac Čačak)
7	DF	BIH	Marko Čubrilo (from Partizan)

Out: Note: Flags indicate national team as defined under FIFA eligibility rules; some limited exceptions apply. Players may hold more than one non-FIFA nationality.

No.	Pos.	Nation	Player
28	MF	SRB	Ivan Marković (to (Sweden) AFC Eskilstuna)
23	MF	SRB	Dušan Mićić (to Radnički Niš)
25	MF	SRB	Miloš Plavšić (to Inđija)
19	FW	SRB	Miloš Podunavac (to Zemun)
15	DF	SRB	Aleksandar Gojković (to (Greece) AEL)
4	DF	SRB	Radoš Bulatović (to Radnički Niš)
24	DF	SRB	Miloš Mijić (to (Bosnia and Herzegovina) Sloboda Tuzla)
14	MF	SRB	Nemanja Mirosavljević (to (Bosnia and Herzegovina) Krupa)
7	FW	SRB	Miloš Stanković (to Voždovac)
22	GK	SRB	Ognjen Čančarević (to (Armenia) Alashkert)
12	GK	SRB	Miloš Ivanović (to Timok)
—		SRB	Faton Džemailji (on loan to Budućnost Popovac, previously brought from (Germany) TSV Schott Mainz)
18	FW	SRB	Iljasa Zulfiu (loan extension to Ozren)

=== Mačva Šabac ===
In: Note: Flags indicate national team as defined under FIFA eligibility rules; some limited exceptions apply. Players may hold more than one non-FIFA nationality.

No.	Pos.	Nation	Player
15	MF	SRB	Matija Miketić (loan return from IMT)
3	DF	SRB	Nemanja Tošić (from Sinđelić Beograd)
45	MF	BIH	Filip Božić (from Partizan)
28	MF	SRB	Đorđe Belić (from (Switzerland) Muttenz)

Out: Note: Flags indicate national team as defined under FIFA eligibility rules; some limited exceptions apply. Players may hold more than one non-FIFA nationality.

No.	Pos.	Nation	Player
3	DF	SRB	Radoš Protić (to (Hungary) Kisvárda)
21	MF	SRB	Jordan Jovanović (to Radnički Pirot)
—	FW	SRB	Ivan Mijailović (to Mačva Bogatić, was on loan at Crvena Zvezda NS)
—	DF	SRB	Vladimir Tomić (loan extension to Železničar Lajkovac)
—		SRB	Luka Pejović (to Provo)
—	MF	SRB	Dušan Nikolić (loan extension to Provo)
—	DF	SRB	Nikola Vasić (loan extension to Provo)
—	DF	SRB	Darko Isailović (loan extension to Provo)
28	DF	SRB	Marko Rajović (to Jedinstvo Ub)
—		SRB	Miloš Radovanović (to Jevremovac)
—	DF	SRB	Nikola Popović (on loan to Cement Beočin, previously brought from Mladost Bački Jarak)
14	DF	MKD	Bojan Gjorgievski (to (Albania) Teuta Durrës)

=== Zemun ===
In: Note: Flags indicate national team as defined under FIFA eligibility rules; some limited exceptions apply. Players may hold more than one non-FIFA nationality.

No.	Pos.	Nation	Player
2	DF	SRB	Predrag Stanimirović (from Dinamo Pančevo)
11	MF	SRB	Nikola Cuckić (from Mladost Lučani)
32	FW	SRB	Miloš Podunavac (from Mladost Lučani)
6	MF	SRB	Strahinja Bosanac (from Žarkovo)
21	FW	SRB	Nikola Nešović (from Sloboda Užice)
8	MF	SRB	Miljan Vukadinović (from (Czech Republic) Mladá Boleslav)
55	DF	SRB	Nikola Petković (from (China) Yanbian Funde)
10	MF	SRB	Veljko Simić (from (Switzerland) Winterthur)
15	FW	AUS	Dejan Pandurević (from (Australia) Manly United)
50	GK	CRO	Ante Knezović (from (Norway) Kristiansund)
—	FW	MKD	Dušan Savić (from (Kazakhstan) Aktobe)
24	DF	SRB	Pavle Ninkov (free, last with (France) Toulouse)
4	DF	SRB	Lazar Kalajanović (from (Bosnia and Herzegovina) Mladost Doboj Kakanj)

Out: Note: Flags indicate national team as defined under FIFA eligibility rules; some limited exceptions apply. Players may hold more than one non-FIFA nationality.

No.	Pos.	Nation	Player
20	FW	FIN	Lauri Dalla Valle (released)
4	MF	SRB	Pavle Popara (retired)
11	MF	SRB	Stefan Dimić (to Mladost Lučani)
15	DF	SRB	Vladimir Bubanja (to (Uzbekistan) AGMK)
33	MF	SRB	Nemanja Mladenović (to (Greece) AEL)
2	DF	SRB	Ivan Božović (on loan to (Malta) Balzan)
50	GK	SRB	Bojan Šaranov (to Radnički Niš)
32	DF	SRB	Tomislav Pajović (to (Uzbekistan) Navbahor Namangan)
22	GK	SRB	Miloš Krunić (on loan to Bežanija)
—	DF	SRB	Marko Nikolić (was on loan, now signed with Inđija)
3	FW	SRB	Miroslav Lečić (to Metalac G. M.)
—	GK	SRB	Predrag Kovačević (on loan to Bežanija, was on loan at Milutinac)
—	MF	SRB	Bogdan Mirić (on loan to Lokomotiva Beograd, was on loan at Stepojevac Vaga)
—	MF	SRB	Aleksa Milošević (to Zvezdara, was on loan at Milutinac)
—	GK	SRB	Marko Blagojević (on loan to Sloga PM, previously brought from the same club)

=== Bačka BP ===
In: Note: Flags indicate national team as defined under FIFA eligibility rules; some limited exceptions apply. Players may hold more than one non-FIFA nationality.

No.	Pos.	Nation	Player
27	MF	SRB	Nikola Dimitrijević (from Budućnost Dobanovci)
33	GK	SRB	Rastko Šuljagić (from Inđija)
28	MF	SRB	Igor Pantić (from Šumadija 1903)
15	DF	SRB	Aleksandar Tasić (from (Moldova) Speranța Nisporeni)
19	FW	SRB	Luka Jovanić (from Dinamo Pančevo)
7	FW	MNE	Nikola Zvrko (from Mladost Lučani)
22	FW	BIH	Miloš Bajić (from (Bulgaria) Arda Kardzhali)
29	MF	SLO	Timotej Dodlek (from (Croatia) Hrvatski Dragovoljac)
23	DF	SRB	Miloš Rnić (from Radnički Pirot)
—	FW	MNE	Đorđije Spahić (from (Montenegro) Cetinje, to youth team)
17	FW	SRB	Filip Bajić (from Napredak Kruševac)

Out: Note: Flags indicate national team as defined under FIFA eligibility rules; some limited exceptions apply. Players may hold more than one non-FIFA nationality.

No.	Pos.	Nation	Player
5	DF	SRB	Marko Klisura (to (Uzbekistan) Buxoro)
2	DF	SRB	Stefan Nikolić (to (Bosnia and Herzegovina) Krupa)
—	DF	MNE	Marko Vidović (to Rad)
12	GK	SRB	Ivan Lučić (to Spartak Subotica)
3	DF	SRB	Marko Bašanović (to Bežanija)
—	DF	SRB	Nemanja Anđelković (to Zlatibor Čajetina, previously brought from ČSK Čelarevo)
22	MF	SRB	Milan Makarić (to (Bosnia and Herzegovina) Zvijezda 09)
15	MF	SRB	Milorad Balabanović (to (Bosnia and Herzegovina) Krupa)
23	MF	SRB	Milan Spremo (to (Uzbekistan) Kokand 1912)

=== Borac Čačak ===
In: Note: Flags indicate national team as defined under FIFA eligibility rules; some limited exceptions apply. Players may hold more than one non-FIFA nationality.

No.	Pos.	Nation	Player
—	DF	SRB	Srđan Pantelić (loan return from Polet Ljubić)
31	MF	SRB	Nikola D. Tasić (from (Kazakhstan) Kyzylzhar)
11	FW	SRB	Miloš Džugurdić (from (North Macedonia) Skopje)
5	DF	SRB	Stefan Drašković (from (Moldova) Dacia Chișinău)
10	MF	SRB	Nenad Lukić (from Rad)

Out: Note: Flags indicate national team as defined under FIFA eligibility rules; some limited exceptions apply. Players may hold more than one non-FIFA nationality.

No.	Pos.	Nation	Player
5	MF	SRB	Miroljub Kostić (to Napredak Kruševac)
31	FW	SRB	Vanja Vučićević (loan return to Red Star Belgrade)
17	DF	SRB	Nikola Ignjatijević (to Rad)
27	MF	SRB	Nemanja Krstić (released)
—	MF	CHN	Zhong Haoran (to (China) Zhejiang Greentown)
7	FW	SRB	Lazar Sajčić (to (Czech Republic) Dynamo České Budějovice)
11	MF	SRB	Pavle Propadalo (to Radnik Surdulica)
30	FW	MNE	Filip Vorotović (to Spartak Subotica)
10	FW	SRB	Igor Savić (to Mladost Lučani)
—	MF	SRB	Ivan Todorović (to Radnički Beograd)
29	GK	SRB	Nikola Timotijević (to Leštane)
43	MF	SRB	Uroš Sekulić (loan extension to Polet Ljubić)
—	GK	SRB	Nikola Z. Tasić (on loan to Polet Ljubić, was on loan at IMT)
—	MF	SRB	Stefan Fićović (loan extension to Polet Ljubić)
—	DF	SRB	Milan Matović (loan extension to Polet Ljubić)
—	MF	SRB	Stefan Kovačević (loan extension to Polet Ljubić)
2	DF	SRB	Njegoš Janjušević (on loan to Polet Ljubić)
28	MF	SRB	Nikola Tripković (on loan to Polet Ljubić)
—	DF	SRB	Dušan Đorđević (to Sloga Kraljevo, was on loan at Polet Ljubić)
32	DF	SRB	Lazar Pajović (to (Montenegro) OFK Petrovac)
—	FW	COD	Francis Masiya (to (France) Fleury 91)
—	MF	CGO	Poba Touré (to (Democratic Republic of the Congo) Renaissance)
—	MF	SRB	Nemanja Bosančić (to (Montenegro) Berane)
22	FW	SRB	Lazar Jovanović (to Mladost Lučani)
18	MF	MNE	Uroš Delić (to (Kazakhstan) Kyzylzhar)

=== Javor Ivanjica ===
In: Note: Flags indicate national team as defined under FIFA eligibility rules; some limited exceptions apply. Players may hold more than one non-FIFA nationality.

No.	Pos.	Nation	Player
25	FW	CIV	Herve Bostan Amani (loan return from Radnički Kragujevac)
9	FW	SRB	Ivan Marković (from Mladost Lučani)
8	FW	BIH	Boban Đerić (from (Bosnia and Herzegovina) Vitez)
22	FW	BIH	Momčilo Mrkaić (from (Bosnia and Herzegovina) Zrinjski Mostar)
23	GK	MNE	Nemanja Šćekić (from (Bulgaria) Montana)
26	MF	SRB	Stefan Panić (from (Czech Republic) Baník Ostrava)
6	MF	SRB	Dino Dolmagić (from (Iceland) Breiðablik)
15	DF	SRB	Đorđe Crnomarković (from Čukarički)
21	FW	SRB	Nikola Petković (from Lokomotiva Beograd)
18	MF	CGO	Romeni Scott Bitsindou (from (Switzerland) United Zürich)

Out: Note: Flags indicate national team as defined under FIFA eligibility rules; some limited exceptions apply. Players may hold more than one non-FIFA nationality.

No.	Pos.	Nation	Player
20	DF	SRB	Milovan Milović (retired, became assistant coach)
26	MF	GHA	Jonas Asare (released)
22	FW	MKD	Filip Ivanovski (to (Finland) RoPS)
33	DF	SRB	Nikola Bjelanović (to Lokomotiva Beograd)
23	GK	SRB	Petar Glintić (to Sloga Požega)
8	MF	SRB	Danko Kiković (to Mladost Lučani)
6	MF	SRB	Nikola Mitić (released)
25	MF	SRB	Vuk Mitošević (to Radnik Surdulica)
15	MF	SRB	Filip Lakićević (to Sloga Požega)
—		SRB	Ognjen Luković (loan extension to Brodarac)
21	DF	BIH	Borislav Terzić (to (Bosnia and Herzegovina) Sloboda Tuzla)
9	FW	SRB	Nikola Dišić (on loan to Proleter Mihajlovac, was on loan at Lokomotiva Beograd)

=== Rad ===
In: Note: Flags indicate national team as defined under FIFA eligibility rules; some limited exceptions apply. Players may hold more than one non-FIFA nationality.

No.	Pos.	Nation	Player
44	MF	SRB	Filip Bainović (on loan from Red Star Belgrade)
4	DF	BRA	Zé Marcos (on loan from Red Star Belgrade)
12	GK	SRB	Nemanja Stevanović (on loan from Partizan)
14	MF	SRB	Veljko Birmančević (on loan from Partizan)
33	DF	SRB	Nikola Ignjatijević (from Borac Čačak)
15	FW	SRB	Nenad Marinković (from Mladost Lučani)
51	DF	SRB	Milan Perendija (free, last with (Romania) Gaz Metan)
9	FW	SRB	Lazar Veselinović (from (Hungary) Mezőkövesd)
31	FW	SRB	Darko Bjedov (on loan from (Belgium) Gent)
5	MF	SRB	Strahinja Karišić (from (England) Watford)
—	DF	MNE	Marko Vidović (from Bačka BP)

Out: Note: Flags indicate national team as defined under FIFA eligibility rules; some limited exceptions apply. Players may hold more than one non-FIFA nationality.

No.	Pos.	Nation	Player
29	FW	MNE	Vule Vujačić (to (Montenegro) Dečić)
—	MF	KOR	Son Joon-hyo (released, was on loan at Bežanija)
34	DF	MNE	Igor Zonjić (to (Malaysia) Terengganu)
89	GK	MNE	Bojan Zogović (to Metalac G. M.)
77	DF	SRB	Zoran Rendulić (to Čukarički)
21	FW	SRB	Luka Ratković (to (Montenegro) Mladost Podgorica)
80	MF	SRB	Nebojša Marinković (to (Malaysia) Sarawak)
55	MF	SRB	Nenad Lukić (to Borac Čačak)
31	GK	SRB	Miljan Pribić (released)
—	DF	SRB	Luka Petrović (released, was on loan at Dinamo Pančevo)
4	DF	SRB	Filip Matović (to GSP Polet Dorćol)
—	FW	SRB	Lazar Đurović (to Borac Sakule)
19	DF	SRB	Strahinja Tanasijević (on loan to (Italy) Chievo)
9	FW	MNE	Boško Guzina (on loan to Bežanija)
—	MF	AUT	Saša Lazić (to (Bosnia and Herzegovina) Podrinje Janja)
—	DF	MNE	Dušan Bigović (to (Montenegro) OFK Petrovac)
98	FW	SRB	Marko Jović (to Železničar Pančevo)
—	FW	MNE	Božidar Damjanović (on loan to (Croatia) Segesta)

== Serbian First League ==
=== Dinamo Vranje ===
In: Note: Flags indicate national team as defined under FIFA eligibility rules; some limited exceptions apply. Players may hold more than one non-FIFA nationality.

No.	Pos.	Nation	Player
26	MF	SRB	Zoran Šćepanović (loan return from Moravac Mrštane)
13	FW	SRB	Lazar Ranđelović (loan extension from Radnički Niš)
—	DF	SRB	Predrag Petošević (from Žarkovo)
88	GK	SRB	Uroš Đurić (from Sloboda Užice)
21	GK	MNE	Boris Božović (from BASK)
2	DF	SRB	Miloš Mijokov (from Temnić)
—	FW	SRB	Milan Petošević (from (United States) Saint Louis)
8	FW	SRB	Luka Stojanović (from Jedinstvo Surčin)
30	FW	SRB	Nikola Milanović (from Dunav Stari Banovci)
—	DF	SRB	Miroslav Kostić (from Komgrap)
7	DF	SRB	Nikola Vukajlović (from (Czech Republic) Viktoria Plzeň)
6	DF	SRB	Jovan Zucović (from (Sweden) Balkan Malmö)
—	MF	SRB	Nemanja Stanisavljević (from (Austria) Favoritner AC)
—	DF	SRB	Ljubo Baranin (from (Malaysia) Kuantan FA)

Out: Note: Flags indicate national team as defined under FIFA eligibility rules; some limited exceptions apply. Players may hold more than one non-FIFA nationality.

No.	Pos.	Nation	Player
21	DF	SRB	Dušan Mladenović (to (Bulgaria) Etar Veliko Tarnovo)
—	DF	SRB	Aleksandar Petrović (to Budućnost Popovac)
30	MF	SRB	Saša Manić (to Žarkovo)
7	MF	SRB	Milan Jeremić (to (Belarus) Gorodeya)
16	FW	SRB	Bojan Zoranović (released)
23	FW	MNE	Todor Babović (to (Montenegro) Cetinje)
9	FW	SRB	Lazar Vidić (to Šumadija 1903)
—	FW	SRB	Momčilo Mladenović (to Goč, was on loan at Moravac Mrštane)
—	FW	SRB	Nikola Stošić (on loan to Jedinstvo Bošnjace)
—	MF	SRB	Aleksandar Mitrović (to Moravac Mrštane)
—	DF	SRB	Nemanja Gorčić (loan extension to Moravac Mrštane)
8	MF	SRB	Aleksandar Jović (on loan to Moravac Mrštane)
—	MF	SRB	Marko Mitić (to Car Konstantin, was on loan at Vranjska Banja)
—	FW	SRB	Nikola Đorđević (to Dinamo Pančevo)
—	MF	SRB	Luka Arsenović (on loan to Vranjska Banja)
88	GK	SRB	Miloš Vesić (to Proleter Novi Sad)

=== Metalac G. M. ===
In: Note: Flags indicate national team as defined under FIFA eligibility rules; some limited exceptions apply. Players may hold more than one non-FIFA nationality.

No.	Pos.	Nation	Player
77	DF	MNE	Lazar Đokić (from Čukarički)
42	GK	MNE	Bojan Zogović (from Rad)
11	FW	SRB	Miroslav Lečić (from Zemun)
15	FW	SRB	Stefan Ilić (from Bežanija)
—	DF	SRB	Branko Jovanović (from (Bosnia and Herzegovina) Olimpik Sarajevo)
13	FW	SRB	Vladimir Petrović (from (Czech Republic) Prostějov)

Out: Note: Flags indicate national team as defined under FIFA eligibility rules; some limited exceptions apply. Players may hold more than one non-FIFA nationality.

No.	Pos.	Nation	Player
77	FW	NGR	Eze Okeuhie (to Vojvodina)
42	GK	SRB	Marko Minić (on loan to BASK)
11	FW	SRB	Marko Nikolić (to Lokomotiva Beograd, was on loan at Stepojevac Vaga)
18	FW	SRB	Andrija Ratković (on loan to Šumadija Aranđelovac)
—	FW	SRB	Andrija Đunisijević (on loan to Takovo, was on loan at Karađorđe Topola)
99	FW	NGR	Augustine Nwagwu (to (Montenegro) Ibar)
—	MF	SRB	Aleksandar Martinović (to Loznica, was on loan at Stepojevac Vaga)
—	FW	SRB	Jovan Joksović (to Lunjevica)
—	FW	SRB	Nikola Grbović (on loan to Polet Ljubić, was on loan at Budućnost Krušik)
5	DF	SRB	Boško Dopuđ (to (France) Oissel)

=== Proleter Novi Sad ===
In: Note: Flags indicate national team as defined under FIFA eligibility rules; some limited exceptions apply. Players may hold more than one non-FIFA nationality.

No.	Pos.	Nation	Player
9	FW	SRB	Milan Mirosavljev (was on loan, now signed from Vojvodina)
8	MF	SRB	Srđan Šćepanović (was on loan, now signed from Vojvodina)
13	FW	MKD	Strahinja Krstevski (loan return from Borac Šajkaš)
—	MF	SRB	Lazar Pavlović (from Crvena Zvezda NS)
—	MF	SRB	Bojan Mandić (from Srbobran)
3	DF	SRB	Dimitrije Tomović (on loan from Spartak Subotica)
6	MF	SRB	Žarko Jeličić (from Budućnost Dobanovci)
—	DF	SRB	Nenad Kočović (from Loznica)
—	DF	SRB	Dejan Đurić (from Brodarac)
1	GK	SRB	Stefan Šurlan (loan return from Mladost Bački Petrovac)
—	DF	SRB	Nikola Đurić (free, last with (Albania) Flamurtari Vlorë)
17	FW	RUS	Maksim Artemchuk (on loan from (Russia) Dynamo Saint Petersburg)
88	GK	SRB	Miloš Vesić (from Dinamo Vranje)
7	FW	SRB	Nemanja Čović (from (Belarus) Minsk)

Out: Note: Flags indicate national team as defined under FIFA eligibility rules; some limited exceptions apply. Players may hold more than one non-FIFA nationality.

No.	Pos.	Nation	Player
23	DF	SRB	Predrag Jović (to (Montenegro) Grbalj)
21	DF	SRB	Marko Prljević (to (Armenia) Shirak)
—	FW	SRB	Luka Bošković (on loan to Šećeranac Ada, was on loan at Brodarac)
11	DF	SRB	Nemanja Stojšić (to Mladost Bački Jarak, was on loan at Borac Novi Sad)
6	MF	SRB	Vladimir Ilić (loan extension to Cement Beočin)
1	GK	SRB	Miloš Sekicki (to Indeks Novi Sad)
18	FW	SRB	Luka Lemić (to Brodarac)
94	GK	SRB	Dejan Stanivuković (to Inđija)
15	FW	SRB	Saša Ćurko (to Radnički SM)
3	DF	SRB	Milivoje Mušikić (to ČSK Čelarevo)
22	MF	SRB	Nikola Šakić (to OFK Odžaci)
—	DF	SRB	Miloš Rajačić (on loan to Sirig)
5	DF	SRB	Miloš Brajović (to Dinamo Pančevo)
—	FW	SRB	Miloš Manojlović (on loan to Bačka 1901, was on loan at Radnički Šid)

=== TSC ===
In: Note: Flags indicate national team as defined under FIFA eligibility rules; some limited exceptions apply. Players may hold more than one non-FIFA nationality.

No.	Pos.	Nation	Player
18	FW	SRB	Marko Stančetić (from Kolubara)
13	DF	BIH	Dajan Ponjević (from ČSK Čelarevo)
—	DF	SRB	Filip Babić (from Vojvodina)
11	FW	BIH	Mladen Galić (from OFK Odžaci)
—	MF	SRB	Aleksa Denković (from Loznica)

Out: Note: Flags indicate national team as defined under FIFA eligibility rules; some limited exceptions apply. Players may hold more than one non-FIFA nationality.

No.	Pos.	Nation	Player
13	MF	SRB	Jakša Krivokapić (to Bajša)
—	FW	SRB	Péter Majoros (to Bajša)
16	MF	SRB	Csongor Boros (to Bajša)
—		SRB	Dragan Čubra (to Partizan)
11	DF	BIH	Dejan Resanović (to OFK Odžaci)
—	FW	SRB	Dejan Juhik (to OFK Odžaci)

=== Sinđelić Beograd ===
In: Note: Flags indicate national team as defined under FIFA eligibility rules; some limited exceptions apply. Players may hold more than one non-FIFA nationality.

No.	Pos.	Nation	Player
2	MF	BIH	Nemanja Matović (from Radnički Pirot)
—	GK	SRB	Goran Buljandrić (from Partizan)
24	DF	AUS	Salvatore Russo (from Bežanija)
22	FW	SRB	Bogdan Mandić (from Voždovac)
16	DF	CRO	Predrag Počuča (from Inđija)
11	MF	SRB	Uroš Mirković (from (Bosnia and Herzegovina) Borac Banja Luka)
13	DF	SRB	Miloš Krstić (from (Philippines) Davao Aguilas)
—	GK	RUS	Sergei Mokoida (from (Russia) Grad Moscow)

Out: Note: Flags indicate national team as defined under FIFA eligibility rules; some limited exceptions apply. Players may hold more than one non-FIFA nationality.

No.	Pos.	Nation	Player
5	DF	SRB	Nemanja Tošić (to Mačva Šabac)
—	DF	SRB	Miloš Stojanović (loan return to Red Star Belgrade)
—	GK	SRB	Miroslav Grujičić (to (Slovakia) Novohrad Lučenec)
—	MF	SRB	Ognjen Tvrdorjeka (to BSK Batajnica)
—	MF	SRB	Luka Panić (to BSK Batajnica)
—	MF	SRB	Stefan Šapić (loan return to Čukarički)
—	FW	SRB	Sacha Varga (to (Slovenia) Brda)

=== Radnički Kragujevac ===
In: Note: Flags indicate national team as defined under FIFA eligibility rules; some limited exceptions apply. Players may hold more than one non-FIFA nationality.

No.	Pos.	Nation	Player
—	GK	SRB	Jovan Najdanović (loan return from Zlatibor Čajetina)
—	FW	SRB	Filip Đurović (from Šumadija 1903)
—		SRB	Miloš Mijailović (loan return from Arsenal Kragujevac)

Out: Note: Flags indicate national team as defined under FIFA eligibility rules; some limited exceptions apply. Players may hold more than one non-FIFA nationality.

No.	Pos.	Nation	Player
—	FW	CIV	Herve Bostan Amani (loan return to Javor Ivanjica)
—	GK	SRB	Spasoje Stefanović (to (North Macedonia) Skopje)
—	MF	SRB	Stefan Nedović (released)
—	MF	SRB	Vasilije Veljko Milovanović (on loan to FAP, was on loan at Smederevo)
—		SRB	Vuk Jašović (on loan to Šumadija Toponica, was on loan at Šumadija 1903)
28	MF	SRB	Marko Milovanović (on loan to Borac Pajsijević, was on loan at Gruža)
—		SRB	Stefan Milošević (on loan to Borac Pajsijević)
—	MF	SRB	Vuk Obradović (on loan to Sušica, was on loan at Arsenal Kragujevac)
—	MF	SRB	Nikola Unković (to Inđija)
14	MF	SRB	Đorđe Andrić (to Sloboda Užice)
85	DF	SRB	Jovan Tatović (to Sušica)

=== Inđija ===
In: Note: Flags indicate national team as defined under FIFA eligibility rules; some limited exceptions apply. Players may hold more than one non-FIFA nationality.

No.	Pos.	Nation	Player
2	DF	SRB	Marko Nikolić (was on loan, now signed from Zemun)
13	MF	SRB	Uroš Galijaš (from ČSK Čelarevo)
—	DF	SRB	Bojan Ciger (from BASK)
20	MF	SRB	Miloš Plavšić (from Radnik Surdulica)
8	MF	SRB	Miloš Milisavljević (from Železničar Lajkovac)
11	MF	SRB	Nemanja Lazić (from Radnički Nova Pazova)
19	FW	SRB	Andrija Majdevac (from Napredak Kruševac)
12	GK	SRB	Miloje Preković (from OFK Beograd)
21	DF	SRB	Nikola Anđelković (from ČSK Čelarevo)
94	GK	SRB	Dejan Stanivuković (from Proleter Novi Sad)
22	FW	SRB	Nebojša Ivančević (from (Bulgaria) Montana)
—	FW	BIH	Danko Radić (from Čukarički)
—	MF	SRB	Nikola Unković (from Radnički Kragujevac)
4	DF	SRB	Boško Gajić (on loan from Spartak Subotica)

Out: Note: Flags indicate national team as defined under FIFA eligibility rules; some limited exceptions apply. Players may hold more than one non-FIFA nationality.

No.	Pos.	Nation	Player
21	FW	SRB	Željko Žerađanin (to Radnički Pirot)
5	DF	SRB	Filip Ungar (to Bečej)
12	GK	SRB	Nemanja Jeveričić (to Loznica)
1	GK	SRB	Rastko Šuljagić (to Bačka BP)
—	FW	SRB	David Panjak (to Hajduk Novi Sad)
7	MF	SRB	Petar Ilić (to (Bosnia and Herzegovina) Borac Banja Luka)
19	FW	SRB	Slavoljub Đokić (to Železničar Inđija)
11	DF	SRB	Milan Srbijanac (on loan to Zlatibor Čajetina)
—	MF	SRB	David Bajić (to Voždovac)
6	DF	CRO	Predrag Počuča (to Sinđelić Beograd)
8	MF	SRB	Vladimir Todić (to Radnički Obrenovac)
—		SRB	Bojan Gardinovački (to Indeks Novi Sad)
15	MF	SRB	Slobodan Krstanović (to ČSK Čelarevo)
—		SRB	Nikola Grković (to Hajduk Beška)
—	DF	SRB	Aleksandar Leđanac (to Bratstvo Prigrevica)
4	MF	SRB	Nemanja Ahčin (to (Slovenia) Krško)
3	DF	SRB	Nemanja Marković (to (Switzerland) Pajde Möhlin)

=== Novi Pazar ===
In: Note: Flags indicate national team as defined under FIFA eligibility rules; some limited exceptions apply. Players may hold more than one non-FIFA nationality.

No.	Pos.	Nation	Player
—	GK	SRB	Pavle Nićiforović (loan return from Jošanica)
—	GK	SRB	Tamer Preljević (loan return from Tutin)

Out: Note: Flags indicate national team as defined under FIFA eligibility rules; some limited exceptions apply. Players may hold more than one non-FIFA nationality.

No.	Pos.	Nation	Player
—	DF	SRB	Stefan Radovanović (to (Malta) Tarxien Rainbows)
55	GK	SRB	Goran Vukliš (to (Bosnia and Herzegovina) Borac Banja Luka)
20	DF	SRB	Deni Pavlović (to (Faroe Islands) KÍ Klaksvík)
31	MF	BIH	Dejan Vukomanović (to (Bosnia and Herzegovina) Olimpik Sarajevo)
—	FW	SRB	Jovan Jovanović (loan return to Radnik Surdulica)
30	DF	SRB	Ibrahim Arifović (to (Faroe Islands) TB/FC Suðuroy/Royn)
7	FW	SRB	Marko Simić (to (Latvia) Spartaks Jūrmala)
—	FW	SRB	Sead Hadžibulić (on loan to Jošanica)
—	DF	SRB	Edo Mujanović (released)
—	GK	SRB	Denis Krasić (to Tutin)

=== Sloboda Užice ===
In: Note: Flags indicate national team as defined under FIFA eligibility rules; some limited exceptions apply. Players may hold more than one non-FIFA nationality.

No.	Pos.	Nation	Player
17	FW	SRB	Đorđe Babić (on loan from, previously sold to Mladost Lučani)
12	GK	ESP	Marko Cicović (from Vojvodina)
8	MF	SRB	Filip Karadarević (from Jedinstvo Putevi)
2	DF	SRB	Milan Jezdimirović (from Jedinstvo Putevi)
14	MF	SRB	Đorđe Andrić (from Radnički Kragujevac)
13	FW	SRB	Vladimir Stanimirović (from Zlatibor Čajetina)
22	FW	RUS	Bogdan Zhbanov (on loan from (Russia) Dynamo Saint Petersburg)
10	FW	SRB	Miloš Živanović (from Radnički Pirot)
5	DF	SRB	Dušan Tamindžić (from Radnički Obrenovac)
66	FW	SRB	Igor Vučićević (from Budućnost Arilje)

Out: Note: Flags indicate national team as defined under FIFA eligibility rules; some limited exceptions apply. Players may hold more than one non-FIFA nationality.

No.	Pos.	Nation	Player
88	MF	SRB	Aleksandar Alempijević (released)
7	MF	SRB	Igor Krmar (to (North Macedonia) Rabotnički)
10	FW	SRB	Nikola Nešović (to Zemun)
1	GK	SRB	Uroš Đurić (to Dinamo Vranje)
6	MF	SRB	Darko Stanojević (to Loznica)
98	GK	SRB	Marko Ristanović (to Budućnost Arilje)
—		SRB	Ivan Krlić (to Sloga BB)
4	DF	MNE	Ognjen Peličić (to (Montenegro) OFK Petrovac)
11	DF	MNE	Balša Peličić (to (Montenegro) OFK Petrovac)
3	MF	SRB	Sreten Atanasković (to IMT)
17	MF	SRB	Nikola Stojanović (to (Belarus) Minsk)
8	MF	SRB	Aleksandar Janković (to (Netherlands) Achilles '29)
9	FW	SRB	Milan Perić (to (Greece) A.O.Loutraki)
29	DF	SRB	Aleksa Vidić (to (Belarus) Smolevichi)
54	DF	SRB	Miloš Nikolić (to (Belarus) Slutsk)
16	FW	NGR	Peter Kolawole (released)
33	FW	NGR	Samuel Nnamani (to (Sweden) AFC Eskilstuna)

=== Budućnost Dobanovci ===
In: Note: Flags indicate national team as defined under FIFA eligibility rules; some limited exceptions apply. Players may hold more than one non-FIFA nationality.

No.	Pos.	Nation	Player
—	DF	SRB	Jovan Simić (loan return from Proleter Vranovo)
—	FW	SRB	Miloš Kukolj (on loan from Partizan)
—	GK	SRB	Goran Čokorilo (from Srem Jakovo)
—	MF	SRB	Nemanja Kruševac (from Sloga Kraljevo)
—	FW	SRB	Dušan Mrđenović (from BSK Batajnica)
—	DF	SRB	Nemanja Jeftić (from BASK)
—	MF	SRB	Filip Osman (from Bežanija)
—	FW	SRB	Miloš Reljić (from (Moldova) Ungheni)
—	MF	SRB	Aleksa Matić (from (Slovakia) Spišská Nová Ves)
—	MF	SRB	Milan Zorica (from (Sweden) Ängelholms FF)

Out: Note: Flags indicate national team as defined under FIFA eligibility rules; some limited exceptions apply. Players may hold more than one non-FIFA nationality.

No.	Pos.	Nation	Player
19	MF	SRB	Nikola Dimitrijević (to Bačka BP)
7	MF	SRB	Nikola Divac (to (Montenegro) Mornar)
20	MF	SRB	Žarko Jeličić (to Proleter Novi Sad)
15	DF	SRB	Nikola Jaćimović (to (North Macedonia) Pobeda Prilep)
—	DF	SRB	Aleksandar Gangolj (to Srem Jakovo)
—	DF	SRB	Filip Milošević (to Sovljak)
—	MF	SRB	Stefan Krkobabić (to Radnički NP)
—	FW	SRB	Petar Jeličić (released)
—		SRB	Uroš Rajković (to Radnički Beograd)
—	GK	SRB	Luka Rajković (to Radnički Beograd)
18	DF	SRB	Nikola Vukajlović (loan return to (Czech Republic) Viktoria Plzeň)

=== ČSK Čelarevo ===
In: Note: Flags indicate national team as defined under FIFA eligibility rules; some limited exceptions apply. Players may hold more than one non-FIFA nationality.

No.	Pos.	Nation	Player
—	FW	SRB	Pavle Šljivančanin (free, last with Proleter Novi Sad)
—	DF	SRB	Nikola Tekijaški (from Železničar Pančevo)
—	MF	SRB	Milan Blagojević (from Karađorđe Topola)
—	DF	SRB	Filip Radović (from Temnić)
—	MF	SRB	Aleksandar Stanić (from OFK Odžaci)
—	MF	SRB	Slobodan Krstanović (from Inđija)
—	DF	SRB	Milivoje Mušikić (from Proleter Novi Sad)
—	MF	SRB	Marko Pantić (on loan from Spartak Subotica)
—	DF	SRB	Mladen Devetak (on loan from Vojvodina)
—	MF	SRB	Kristijan Živković (on loan from Vojvodina)
—	FW	SRB	Miloš Zličić (on loan from Vojvodina)
—	GK	SRB	Vukašin Pilipović (on loan from Vojvodina)
—	MF	SRB	Luka Sinđić (on loan from Vojvodina)

Out: Note: Flags indicate national team as defined under FIFA eligibility rules; some limited exceptions apply. Players may hold more than one non-FIFA nationality.

No.	Pos.	Nation	Player
—	MF	GRE	Yiannis Nestoras (released)
—	FW	SRB	Nikola Popović (to (Montenegro) Grbalj)
—	DF	SRB	Nemanja Anđelković (to Bačka BP)
9	FW	SRB	Kosta Bajić (to (Albania) Besëlidhja Lezhë)
14	MF	SRB	Uroš Galijaš (to Inđija)
17	DF	SRB	Nikola Anđelković (to Inđija)
11	DF	BIH	Dajan Ponjević (to TSC)
8	FW	SRB	Goran Potkozarac (to Bečej)
—	DF	SRB	Damjan Todorović (to Mladost Bački Jarak, was on loan at Crvena Zvezda NS)
—	DF	SRB	Branislav Tucakov (to Radnički SM, was on loan at Sloga Temerin)
—		SRB	Nikola Živanov (to Budućnost Gložan)
—		SRB	Jovan Damnjanović (on loan to Budućnost Gložan)
—	DF	SRB	Petar Škorić (on loan to Hercegovac Gajdobra, previously brought from Grafičar Beograd)
—	GK	SRB	Ivan Nemet (on loan to Hercegovac Gajdobra, previously brought from Tvrđava Bač)
4	MF	SRB	Vukan Vujošević (to Vrbas)
3	DF	SRB	Uglješa Jević (to Radnički SM)
—		SRB	Srđan Mirković (on loan to Proleter Ravno Selo, was on loan Mladost Kruščić)
—	MF	SRB	Ognjen Dučić (was on loan, now signed with Radnički Zrenjanin)
15	FW	KOR	Cho Min-se (to (Croatia) Vukovar 1991)
18	DF	SRB	Igor Stepančev (to (Bosnia and Herzegovina) Iskra Bugojno)
—	DF	GUA	Adolfo Alvarez (released)
20	FW	NGR	Kelvin Obasi (released)

=== Teleoptik ===
In: Note: Flags indicate national team as defined under FIFA eligibility rules; some limited exceptions apply. Players may hold more than one non-FIFA nationality.

No.	Pos.	Nation	Player
—		SRB	Sreten Popović (from Jedinstvo SP)
—	DF	SRB	Jovan Vlalukin (on loan from Partizan)
—	DF	SRB	Suzan Ilijazi (from Hajduk Beograd)
—	GK	SRB	Jovica Mitrović (from Tabane)
—	DF	SRB	Strahinja Kojić (from Tabane)
—		SRB	Dragan Čubra (on loan from Partizan)
—	DF	SRB	Zlatan Šehović (on loan from Partizan)
—	DF	SRB	Nikola Mirić (on loan from Partizan)
—	FW	BIH	Marko Simović (free, last with (Sweden) IFK Luleå)
—	MF	MNE	Petar Sekulović (from (Montenegro) Bratstvo Cijevna)
—	FW	SRB	Đorđe Ivković (free, last with (Slovenia) Ankaran)

Out: Note: Flags indicate national team as defined under FIFA eligibility rules; some limited exceptions apply. Players may hold more than one non-FIFA nationality.

No.	Pos.	Nation	Player
—	FW	SRB	Vladimir Đilas (loan return to Partizan)
—	GK	SRB	Nemanja Stevanović (loan return to Partizan)
—	FW	SRB	Miloš Bogunović (to Žarkovo)
—	DF	SRB	Stefan Grbović (loan return to Partizan)
—	MF	SRB	Veljko Birmančević (loan return to Partizan)
—	FW	SRB	Stefan Serdar (to (Bosnia and Herzegovina) Zvijezda Gradačac)
—	DF	BIH	Marko Čubrilo (loan return to Partizan)
—	DF	SRB	Luka Cucin (loan return to Partizan)
—	FW	SRB	Strahinja Jovanović (loan return to Partizan)
—	GK	SRB	Aleksandar Popović (loan return to Partizan)
—	MF	SRB	Lazar Vujanić (loan return to Partizan)
—	FW	SRB	Aleksandar Katanić (to Dunav Stari Banovci)

=== Bežanija ===
In: Note: Flags indicate national team as defined under FIFA eligibility rules; some limited exceptions apply. Players may hold more than one non-FIFA nationality.

No.	Pos.	Nation	Player
10	MF	SRB	Stefan Matijević (from Kolubara)
22	GK	SRB	Miloš Krunić (on loan from Zemun)
7	FW	MNE	Boško Guzina (on loan from Rad)
12	GK	SRB	Predrag Kovačević (on loan from Zemun)
15	DF	SRB	Marko Bašanović (from Bačka BP)
17	FW	SRB	Vladimir Radočaj (from Milutinac)
—	DF	SRB	Đorđe Vidić (from Radnički Beograd)
20	FW	SRB	Nenad Perović (from Dunav Stari Banovci)
—	MF	SRB	Bojan Lečić (from Dunav Stari Banovci)
16	DF	SRB	Stefan Javorac (from Dunav Stari Banovci)
2	DF	BIH	Saša Kolunija (from (India) Shivajians)

Out: Note: Flags indicate national team as defined under FIFA eligibility rules; some limited exceptions apply. Players may hold more than one non-FIFA nationality.

No.	Pos.	Nation	Player
3	MF	KOR	Son Joon-hyo (loan return to Rad)
—	DF	BRA	Mateus Viveiros (loan return to Red Star Belgrade)
—	DF	SRB	Nikola Radmanovac (loan return to Napredak Kruševac)
16	MF	SRB	Ivan Perić (to (Greece) Aiginiakos)
20	MF	SRB	Milan Jokić (to Zlatibor Čajetina)
—	DF	CHN	Liu Bin (to (China) Chongqing Lifan)
—	MF	SRB	Dejan Babić (to (Bosnia and Herzegovina) Vitez)
—	DF	AUS	Salvatore Russo (to Sinđelić Beograd)
70	GK	SRB	Milovan Lekić (to Radnik Surdulica)
12	GK	SRB	Zdravko Marić (to Rakovica)
—	FW	SRB	Stefan Ilić (to Metalac G. M.)
14	DF	SRB	Petar Aničić (to Tabane)
21	MF	SRB	Filip Osman (to Budućnost Dobanovci)
—	MF	SRB	Srđan Ćirović (to BSK Borča)
2	MF	SRB	Luka Sekulić (loan extension to Jedinstvo Surčin)
15	DF	SRB	Marko Milić (to (Uzbekistan) Kokand 1912)
10	MF	SRB	Nikola Lekić (to Smederevo)
—	MF	SRB	Dušan Mihajlović (to Vršac)
—	MF	BIH	Vanja Zekić (to (Bosnia and Herzegovina) Napredak Donji Šepak)
—		KOR	Park Chan-sol (to (Austria) Bleiburg)

=== Radnički Pirot ===
In: Note: Flags indicate national team as defined under FIFA eligibility rules; some limited exceptions apply. Players may hold more than one non-FIFA nationality.

No.	Pos.	Nation	Player
—	DF	SRB	Darko Vasić (loan return from Tanasko Rajić)
—	FW	SRB	Željko Žerađanin (from Inđija)
—	DF	MKD	Filip Stojanovski (from (North Macedonia) SSK Kisela Voda)
—	MF	SRB	Jordan Jovanović (from Mačva Šabac)
—	DF	SRB	Stefan Petrić (from (Bosnia and Herzegovina) Slavija Sarajevo)
—	GK	SRB	Miroslav Stamenković (from Jagodina)
—	DF	SRB	Zlatko Liščević (from Bratstvo Prigrevica)
—	DF	SRB	Milan Nikolić (from (Philippines) Meralco Manila)
—	MF	CHN	Wei Changsheng (on loan from (China) Hebei CFFC)
—	DF	CHN	Wang Hongzhi (on loan from (China) Hebei CFFC)
—	MF	CHN	Li Shuaihu (on loan from (China) Hebei CFFC)
—	MF	CHN	Yang Shaochen (on loan from (China) Hebei CFFC)
—	FW	CHN	Yao Xuchen (on loan from (China) Hebei CFFC)
—	DF	CHN	Yang Chenyu (on loan from (China) Hebei CFFC)

Out: Note: Flags indicate national team as defined under FIFA eligibility rules; some limited exceptions apply. Players may hold more than one non-FIFA nationality.

No.	Pos.	Nation	Player
—	FW	SRB	Mladen Radenković (loan return to Radnički Niš)
23	DF	SRB	Miloš Rnić (to Bačka BP)
—	DF	SRB	Luka Vasov (to Sopot, was on loan at Tanasko Rajić)
—	FW	SRB	Darko Nikolić (to Vlasina)
—	GK	SRB	Nikola Savić (loan extension to Zaplanjac)
—	MF	SRB	Igor Kostadinović (loan extension to Jedinstvo Bošnjace)
21	FW	SRB	Igor Grkajac (to Tutin)
—	FW	SRB	Aleksandar Džunić (to Tanasko Rajić)
—	DF	SRB	Stefan Ćirić (to Tanasko Rajić)
—		SRB	Jovan Velev (loan extension to Tanasko Rajić)
—	FW	SRB	Uroš Đurić (loan extension to Tanasko Rajić)
—		SRB	Miloš Stojanov (was on loan, now signed with Balkanski)
—		SRB	Nikola Ćirić (loan extension to Balkanski)
—	DF	SRB	Marko Davidović (loan extension to Balkanski)
—	MF	SRB	Stefan Todorović (loan extension to Balkanski)
22	GK	SRB	Vojislav Ilić (on loan to Balkanski)
—	GK	SRB	Nemanja Đorđević (loan extension to Lužnica)
—		SRB	Miloš Milojević (loan extension to Lužnica)
—		SRB	Darko Bogdanović (on loan to Tanasko Rajić)
—	MF	SRB	Aleksandar Bandić (to Jedinstvo Pirot, was on loan at Tanasko Rajić)
2	MF	BIH	Nemanja Matović (to Sinđelić Beograd)
10	FW	SRB	Miloš Živanović (to Sloboda Užice)
18	FW	SRB	Luka Petrović (to (Slovenia) Rogaška)
13	MF	NGR	Emeka Emerun (released)

=== Temnić ===
In: Note: Flags indicate national team as defined under FIFA eligibility rules; some limited exceptions apply. Players may hold more than one non-FIFA nationality.

No.	Pos.	Nation	Player
—	MF	SRB	Jovan Jovanović (loan return from Bošnjane)
10	MF	SRB	Marko Stanojević (loan extension from Napredak Kruševac)
6	DF	SRB	Miloš Tintor (from Loznica)
5	DF	SRB	Vukašin Tomić (free, last with (Kazakhstan) Atyrau)
13	DF	SRB	Marko Ristić (from Jagodina)
20	MF	SRB	Aladin Đakovac (free, last with (Montenegro) Lovćen)
16	MF	SRB	Uroš Krunić (free, last with Dinamo Vranje)
17	DF	SRB	Jovan Stević (from BASK)
11	DF	SRB	Dalibor Simonović (from Sloga Ćićevac)
9	FW	CMR	Ferdinand Fru Fon (from (Cameroon) Grassland)
—	MF	SRB	Nemanja Nešić (from (Slovakia) Liptovský Hrádok)
18	DF	GHA	Maxwell Mensah (from (Italy) Vastese)

Out: Note: Flags indicate national team as defined under FIFA eligibility rules; some limited exceptions apply. Players may hold more than one non-FIFA nationality.

No.	Pos.	Nation	Player
9	FW	SRB	Andrija Majdevac (loan return to Napredak Kruševac)
12	GK	SRB	Lazar Azdejković (to Župa Aleksandrovac)
—	DF	SRB	Filip Radović (to ČSK Čelarevo, was on loan at Trstenik PPT)
13	DF	SRB	Miloš Mijokov (to Dinamo Vranje)
19	DF	SRB	Stefan Todorović (to Tutin)
7	FW	SRB	Stefan Sibinović (to Tutin)
3	FW	SRB	Dušan Ristić (to Železničar Lajkovac)
18	MF	SRB	Nikola Rajković (to SFS Borac Paraćin)
17	DF	SRB	Borko Milenković (to Tutin)
16	MF	SRB	Milan Petrović (released)
—	GK	SRB	Nikola Jovanović (to Ozren)
—	MF	SRB	Nemanja Boškovac (to Velika Morava, was on loan at Bukovik Ražanj)
—	FW	SRB	Aldin Lukić (to RAS Novi Pazar)
2	DF	SRB	Dušan Vukajlović (to SFS Borac Paraćin)
—	MF	SRB	Saša Antić (to Varvarin)
—		SRB	Aleksandar Mirković (released)
—	FW	SRB	Ilija Stojanović (released, was on loan at Jedinstvo Paraćin)

=== Jagodina ===
In: Note: Flags indicate national team as defined under FIFA eligibility rules; some limited exceptions apply. Players may hold more than one non-FIFA nationality.

No.	Pos.	Nation	Player

Out: Note: Flags indicate national team as defined under FIFA eligibility rules; some limited exceptions apply. Players may hold more than one non-FIFA nationality.

No.	Pos.	Nation	Player
12	GK	SRB	Miroslav Stamenković (to Radnički Pirot)
—	FW	SRB	Luka Milisavljević (to (Bosnia and Herzegovina) Slavija Sarajevo, was on loan at Tabane)
50	DF	SRB	Marko Mirkailo (to Voždovac)
7	FW	SRB	Dragan Milovanović (to Trayal)
13	DF	SRB	Marko Ristić (to Temnić)
21	FW	SRB	Igor Dimitrijević (on loan to Tabane)
—		SRB	Aleksandar Jović (on loan to Lugomir)
—	MF	SRB	Aleksa Najdanović (on loan to Radnički Svilajnac, was on loan at Tabane)
28	DF	SRB	Marko Paunović (to (Finland) Haka)

== See also ==
- Serbian SuperLiga
- 2017–18 Serbian SuperLiga
- Serbian First League
- 2017–18 Serbian First League
