= Yao Xuchen =

Chinese footballer

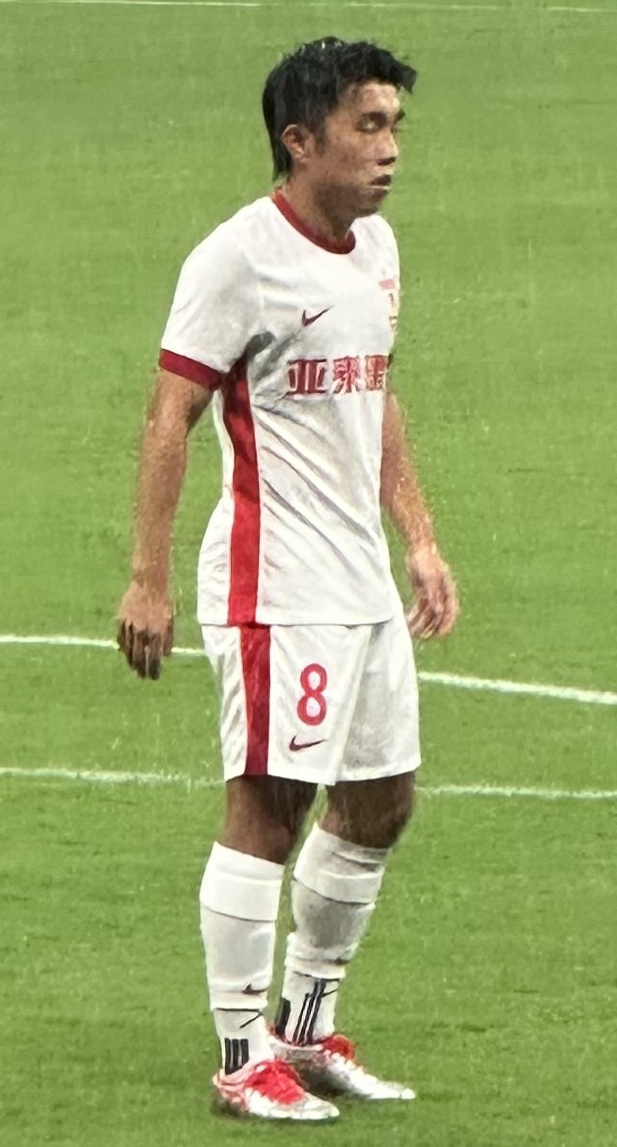
- Yao Xuchen in June 2025

Personal information
- Full name: Yao Xuchen
- Date of birth: 11 September 1999 (age 27)
- Place of birth: Baoding, Hebei, China
- Height: 1.76 m (5 ft 9 in)
- Position: Winger

Team information
- Current team: Dalian Kewei
- Number: 18

Youth career
- –: Hebei China Fortune
- 2017: → Radnički Pirot (loan)

Senior career*
Years	Team	Apps	(Gls)
2018	→ Radnički Pirot (loan)	4	(0)
2019	→ Beijing Sport University (loan)	17	(0)
2020	→ Inner Mongolia Zhongyou (loan)	3	(0)
2021–2022	Hebei FC	46	(3)
2023–2024	Cangzhou Mighty Lions	32	(1)
2025	Changchun Yatai	12	(0)
2025	→ Qingdao Red Lions (loan)	12	(0)
2026	Meizhou Hakka	5	(0)
2026–	Dalian Kewei	0	(0)

International career
2019	China U19		
2022	China U23		
Medal record
Representing China
Men's football
EAFF Championship
Bronze medal – third place	2022 Japan	Team
- * Club domestic league appearances and goals as of 9 March 2026

Yao Xuchen (Chinese: 么旭辰; born 11 September 1999) is a Chinese footballer who plays as a left-footed winger for China League Two club Dalian Kewei.

== Club career ==
As a member of the Hebei China Fortune youth academy, Yao Xuchen moved to the Serbian side Radnički Pirot on 6 October 2017, along with teammates Wei Changsheng, Wang Hongzhi, Li Shuaihu, Yang Shaochen and Yang Chenyu as a part of a cooperation between the two teams. He would be promoted to the senior team on 1 March 2018, until his loan period officially ended on 30 June 2018. Under head coach Goran Lazarević, Yao would be selected for the 27 April 2018, 24th league fixture match of the 2017–18 Serbian First League campaign against Jagodina as an unused substitute. He made his professional debut replacing Nemanja Petrov in 83rd minute of the away match against Novi Pazar on 6 May 2018. After the match against Radnički Kragujevac, when he was also used as a back-up, Yao started his first match on the pitch in 0–0 draw to Inđija on 26 May 2018. Finally, he also started the last game of the season, making an assist to Nemanja Petrov in 3–0 away victory over Sloboda Užice.

In February 2019, Yao was loaned to China League One side Beijing Sport University for the 2019 season. This would be followed by another loan period with Inner Mongolia Zhongyou. On his return he would be promoted to the senior team of Hebei and would make his debut for the club in a league game on 23 April 2021 against Wuhan in a 1-1 draw. He would go on to score his first goal on 19 July 2021 against Changchun Yatai in a league game that ended in a 2-1 victory.

On 28 January 2025, Yao signed with Chinese Super League club Changchun Yatai.

On 22 June 2026, Yao signed with China League Two club Dalian Kewei.

== International career ==
At the beginning of May 2018, it was announced Yao had been called into the China under-19 national team, along with teammates Yang Chenyu and Wei Changsheng, who had already played with the team. He missed to take a part in the squad because of the club's schedule.

== Career statistics ==
As of 9 March 2026.

Appearances and goals by club, season and competition
Club	Season	League			National Cup		Continental		Other		Total	
Club	Season	Division	Apps	Goals	Apps	Goals	Apps	Goals	Apps	Goals	Apps	Goals
Radnički Pirot (loan)	2017–18	First League	4	0	0	0	—		—		4	0
Beijing Sport University (loan)	2019	China League One	17	0	2	0	–		–		19	0
Inner Mongolia Zhongyou (loan)	2020	China League One	3	0	0	0	-		-		14	0
Hebei FC	2021	Chinese Super League	19	1	0	0	-		-		19	1
Hebei FC	2022	Chinese Super League	27	2	0	0	-		-		27	2
Hebei FC	Total		46	3	0	0	0	0	0	0	46	3
Cangzhou Mighty Lions	2023	Chinese Super League	14	0	1	0	-		-		15	0
Cangzhou Mighty Lions	2024	Chinese Super League	18	1	1	0	-		-		19	1
Cangzhou Mighty Lions	Total		32	1	2	0	0	0	0	0	34	1
Changchun Yatai	2025	Chinese Super League	12	0	1	0	-		-		13	0
Qingdao Red Lions (loan)	2025	China League One	12	0	0	0	-		-		12	0
Career total			126	4	5	0	0	0	0	0	131	4
