= Ferdinand Fru Fon =

Cameroonian footballer

Personal information
- Full name: Ferdinand Fru Fon
- Date of birth: 30 May 1998 (age 28)
- Place of birth: Nsongwa, Cameroon
- Position: Forward

Senior career*
Years	Team	Apps	(Gls)
2014–2017	Grassland		
2018	Temnić	11	(3)
2018–2019	Dinamo Vranje	1	(0)
- * Club domestic league appearances and goals as of 11 September 2018

Ferdinand Fru Fon (born 30 May 1998) is a Cameroonian football striker, most recently playing with FK Dinamo Vranje in the Serbian SuperLiga.

== Club career ==
Born in Nsongwa, he played with Grassland FC in Cameroon. In February 2017 his good performances at Grassland caught the attention on behalve of the scouts of Debreceni VSC however the move didn´t materialise. Despite that, Fru Fon stayed in Europe, was expected to sign with Serbian top-league side FK Javor Ivanjica, a club with tradition in bringing young African talents to Europe, but ended up signing with FK Temnić 1924, a club playing in Serbian First League, Serbian second level. Fru Fon played with Temnić the second-half of the 2017–18 Serbian First League, and despite the fact that Temnić ended relegated, Fru Fon impressed and in summer 2018 he moved to FK Dinamo Vranje, a club that contrary to Temnić, got promoted at the end of the season. Fru Fon debuted with Dinamo in the 2018–19 Serbian SuperLiga on September, 2, 2018, in a away defeat by 2–0 against FK Spartak Subotica.
