= Miloš Kukolj =

Serbian footballer

Personal information
- Full name: Miloš Kukolj
- Date of birth: 1 December 1998 (age 27)
- Place of birth: Novi Banovci, FR Yugoslavia
- Height: 1.72 m (5 ft 8 in)
- Position: Winger

Team information
- Current team: Radnički Obrenovac

Youth career
- Partizan

Senior career*
Years	Team	Apps	(Gls)
2015–2019	Partizan	1	(0)
2016	→ Bežanija (loan)	0	(0)
2017	→ IMT (loan)	13	(2)
2017	→ Dinamo 1945 (loan)	14	(1)
2018–2019	→ Budućnost Dobanovci (loan)	38	(1)
2020	Budućnost Dobanovci	3	(0)
2020	Radnički Sremska Mitrovica	6	(0)
2020–2021	Radnički Pirot	23	(2)
2021–2023	Inđija	26	(1)
2023	→ Omladinac Novi Banovci (loan)		
2023	Radnički Beograd	13	(0)
2024-	Radnički Obrenovac		

International career
2015–2016	Serbia U18	4	(0)
- * Club domestic league appearances and goals as of 26 December 2023

Miloš Kukolj (Serbian Cyrillic: Милош Кукољ; born 1 December 1998) is a Serbian professional footballer who plays as a forward.

== Club career ==
=== Partizan ===
Born in Novi Banovci, Kukolj passed FK Partizan youth school. made his professional debut for Partizan in the last fixture match of 2014–15 Serbian SuperLiga season against Borac Čačak, played on 24 May 2015. After 2015–16 season he had spent with youth team, Kukolj signed a three-year professional contract with Partizan and moved to Serbian First League side Bežanija on one-year loan closely. As he spent the first season match sitting on the bench and missed next 2 matches, loan was terminated and Kukolj returned to Partizan in last days of the summer transfer window 2016. In the winter break off-season, Kukolj was loaned to the Serbian League Belgrade side IMT, and shortly after he was nominated for the best young player of the tournament "Čukarica 2017". In summer 2017, Kukolj was loaned to Dinamo 1945, where he played in the Serbian League Vojvodina as a bonus player for a half-season. He also moved on loan to the Serbian First League club Budućnost Dobanovci until the end of the 2017–18 campaign.

== International career ==
As a coach of Serbia U18 national team level, Ivan Tomić invited Kukolj into the squad in 2015. He made several matches for the team until 2016.

== Career statistics ==
As of 9 June 2018

Club	Season	League			Cup		Continental		Other		Total	
Club	Season	Division	Apps	Goals	Apps	Goals	Apps	Goals	Apps	Goals	Apps	Goals
Partizan	2014–15	Serbian SuperLiga	1	0	—		—		—		1	0
Partizan	2015–16	Serbian SuperLiga	0	0	0	0	0	0	—		0	0
Partizan	2016–17	Serbian SuperLiga	0	0	0	0	0	0	—		0	0
Partizan	Total		1	0	0	0	0	0	—		1	0
Bežanija (loan)	2016–17	Serbian First League	0	0	—		—		—		0	0
IMT (loan)	2016–17	Serbian League Belgrade	13	2	—		—		—		13	2
Dinamo 1945 (loan)	2017–18	Serbian League Vojvodina	14	1	—	—		16	1			
Budućnost Dobanovci (loan)	2017–18	Serbian First League	12	1	—		—		—		12	1
Career total			40	4	2	1	0	0	—		14	2

== Honours ==
Partizan

- Serbian SuperLiga: 2014–15
