= Miloš Stojanović (footballer, born 1997) =

Serbian footballer

Personal information
- Full name: Miloš Stojanović
- Date of birth: 18 January 1997 (age 29)
- Place of birth: Belgrade, FR Yugoslavia
- Height: 1.82 m (6 ft 0 in)
- Position: Centre back

Team information
- Current team: Hapoel Afula
- Number: 34

Youth career
- –2013: Red Star Belgrade

Senior career*
Years	Team	Apps	(Gls)
2013–2017	Red Star Belgrade	5	(0)
2015	→ Kolubara (loan)	6	(0)
2015–2017	→ Bežanija (loan)	(Note: Does not include 22 fixture match of the 2016–17 campaign against ČSK Čelarevo, wrongly attributed to him.)30	(2)
2017	→ Sinđelić Beograd (loan)	13	(0)
2018	Voždovac	0	(0)
2018–2019	Bežanija	23	(1)
2019	Budućnost Dobanovci	13	(0)
2020	Sloboda Tuzla	2	(0)
2020–2022	Bylis Ballsh	41	(2)
2022–2023	Kastrioti Krujë	34	(1)
2023–2025	Vllaznia Shkodër	57	(5)
2025–	Hapoel Afula	0	(0)

International career
2012–2013	Serbia U16	11	(0)
2013–2014	Serbia U17	16	(0)
2014–2015	Serbia U18	4	(0)
2015–2016	Serbia U19	5	(0)
2016–2017	Serbia U20	5	(0)
- * Club domestic league appearances and goals as of 1 June 2025

Miloš Stojanović (Serbian Cyrillic: Милош Стојановић, pronounced [mǐloʃ stojǎːnoʋitɕ]; born 18 January 1997) is a Serbian professional footballer who plays as a defender for Hapoel Afula.

== Club career ==
=== Red Star Belgrade ===
==== First team highlights ====
Stojanović joined the first team of Red Star Belgrade, under coach Ricardo Sá Pinto for the final match of 2012–13 Serbian SuperLiga season Vojvodina. During the summer 2013, Stojanović passed the pre-season with the first team, but later returned in youth squad, where he spent the whole 2013–14 season. He was also with the first team at the beginning of 2014–15 season, but continued playing with youth until the end of season. He was one of 4 players on the bench in the last fixture of the 2014–15 Serbian SuperLiga season against Mladost Lučani, when he also made an official debut for the first team under coach Nenad Lalatović. On 18 February 2016, Stojanović extended his contract with Red Star Belgrade, until the summer 2019, and made noted 3 caps until the end of 2015–16 season. In January 2018, Red Star and Stojanović mutually terminated the contract, after which he left the club.

==== Loan spells ====
During the spring half of 2014–15 season, Stojanović was loaned to Serbian First League side Kolubara, where he spent some period on dual registration, making 6 appearances mostly as a side-back. In summer 2015, Stojanović moved to Bežanija at dual registration, along with goalkeeper Filip Manojlović. During the first half season he missed some period because of injury, and he played just 5 league matches. After signing a new contract with his home club, Stojanović stayed with Bežanija until the end of season. Although he spent summer training with OFK Beograd, Stojanović continued playing with Bežanija for the 2016–17 season. After Nemanja Matović left Bežanija at the beginning of 2017, Stojanović started second half-season as a vice-captain, behind Filip Osman. In summer 2017, Stojanović joined Sinđelić Beograd at one-year loan deal. In the mid-season, a loan deal was terminated and Stojanović returned to Red Star Belgrade.

=== Voždovac ===
On 23 January 2018, Stojanović joined Voždovac as a single player, signing a two-and-a-half-year deal with new club.

== Career statistics ==
=== Club ===
As of 26 November 2017

Appearances and goals by club, season and competition
Club	Season	League			Cup		Continental		Other		Total	
Club	Season	Division	Apps	Goals	Apps	Goals	Apps	Goals	Apps	Goals	Apps	Goals
Red Star Belgrade	2012–13	SuperLiga	0	0	—		—		—		0	0
Red Star Belgrade	2013–14	SuperLiga	0	0	0	0	0	0	—		0	0
Red Star Belgrade	2014–15	SuperLiga	1	0	0	0	—		—		1	0
Red Star Belgrade	2015–16	SuperLiga	3	0	0	0	0	0	—		3	0
Red Star Belgrade	2016–17	SuperLiga	1	0	0	0	0	0	—		1	0
Red Star Belgrade	2017–18	SuperLiga	0	0	—		0	0	—		0	0
Red Star Belgrade	Total		5	0	0	0	0	0	—		5	0
Kolubara (loan)	2014–15	First League	6	0	—		—		—		6	0
Bežanija (loan)	2015–16	First League	11	0	0	0	—		—		11	0
Bežanija (loan)	2016–17	First League	19	2	0	0	—		—		19	2
Bežanija (loan)	Total		30	2	0	0	—		—		30	2
Sinđelić Beograd (loan)	2017–18	First League	13	0	1	0	—		—		14	2
Voždovac	2017–18	SuperLiga	0	0	—		—		—		0	0
Career total			54	2	1	0	0	0	—		55	2

== Honours ==
Red Star Belgrade

- Serbian SuperLiga: 2013–14, 2015–16
