= Miloš Stojanović =

Miloš Stojanović may refer to:

- Miloš Stojanović (footballer, born 1984), Serbian association football player who plays for Gyeongnam FC
- Miloš Stojanović (footballer, born 1997), Serbian association football player who plays for Red Star Belgrade
