= Marko Mirkailo =

Serbian footballer (born 1998)

Personal information
- Full name: Marko Mirkailo
- Date of birth: 20 June 1998 (age 28)
- Place of birth: Jagodina, FR Yugoslavia
- Height: 1.91 m (6 ft 3 in)
- Positions: Centre-back; right-back

Team information
- Current team: SFS Borac

Youth career
- Junior
- Jagodina

Senior career*
Years	Team	Apps	(Gls)
2015–2017	Jagodina	19	(0)
2015–2016	→ Tabane Trgovački (loan)	16	(0)
2018	Voždovac	2	(0)
2018–2019	Temnić 1924		
2019–	SFS Borac		

International career^{‡}
2016	Serbia U18	1	(0)
- * Club domestic league appearances and goals as of 5 May 2018 ‡ National team caps and goals as of 10 January 2018

Marko Mirkailo (Serbian Cyrillic: Марко Миркаило; born 20 June 1998) is a Serbian footballer, who plays as a defender for SFS Borac.

== Club career ==
=== Jagodina ===
Mirkailo started training football with local football school Junior, and later joined FK Jagodina. He signed scholarship deal with club as a cadet in 2013. As one of the most perspective players in the youth school, Mirkailo was loaned to Tabane Trgovački for the 2015–16 season. At the beginning of 2016, Marko signed his first professional contract with Jagodina as the best youth player of Pomoravlje District. Mirkailo joined the first team of FK Jagodina for the match against FK Čukarički played on 2 April 2016 under coach Stevan Mojsilović. In summer 2016, Mirailo extended his loan at Tabane Trgovački as a one-year dual registration until the end of 2016–17 Serbian League East season. In the winter break-off season a loan deal was terminated and Mirkailo continued season a regular team member of FK Jagodina. Making 21 appearances at total in domestic competitions for the club, Mirkailo and Jagodina mutually terminated the contract at the beginning of 2018.

=== Voždovac ===
On 18 January 2018, Mirkailo signed a four-year contract with Voždovac. Mirkailo made his debut for new club on 23 February 2018, replacing Nebojša Gavrić in 90 minute of 3–2 victory over Napredak Kruševac. He also started his first match on the field for Voždovac in 2–1 away defeat against Čukarički in May 2018. He played a full-time match, replacing suspended Miloš Mihajlov.

== International career ==
Mirkailo was called in Serbia national under-18 football team for several friendly matches in 2016. He made his debut for the team in 1–1 draw to Hungary on 21 April 2016.

== Career statistics ==
As of 5 May 2018

Appearances and goals by club, season and competition
Club	Season	League			Cup		Continental		Other		Total	
Club	Season	Division	Apps	Goals	Apps	Goals	Apps	Goals	Apps	Goals	Apps	Goals
Tabane (loan)	2015–16	Serbian League East	10	0	—		—		—		10	0
Tabane (loan)	2016–17	Serbian League East	6	0	—		—		—		6	0
Tabane (loan)	Total		16	0	—		—		—		16	0
Jagodina	2015–16	Serbian SuperLiga	5	0	0	0	—		—		5	0
Jagodina	2016–17	Serbian First League	4	0	1	0	—		—		5	0
Jagodina	2017–18	Serbian First League	10	0	1	0	—		—		11	0
Jagodina	Total		19	0	2	0	—		—		21	0
Voždovac	2017–18	Serbian SuperLiga	2	0	—		—		—		2	0
Career total			37	0	2	0	—		—		39	0
