= Marko Stanojević (footballer, born 1997) =

Serbian footballer

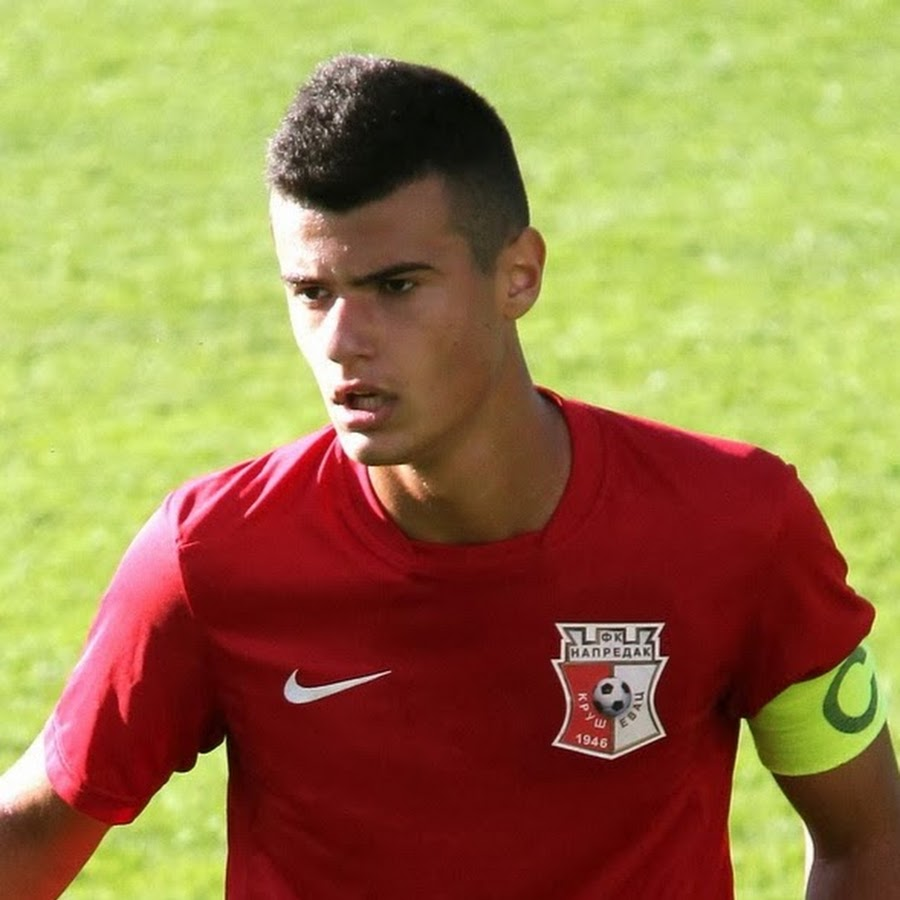
- Stanojević with Napredak

Personal information
- Full name: Marko Stanojević
- Date of birth: 4 May 1997 (age 29)
- Place of birth: Kruševac, FR Yugoslavia
- Height: 1.84 m (6 ft 0 in)
- Position: Defensive midfielder

Team information
- Current team: Trayal Kruševac
- Number: 8

Youth career
- Napredak Kruševac

Senior career*
Years	Team	Apps	(Gls)
2014–2018	Napredak Kruševac	2	(0)
2016–2018	→ Temnić (loan)	48	(0)
2018–2019	Dinamo Vranje	3	(0)
2019	Trayal Kruševac	8	(0)
2019–2020	Tarxien Rainbows	11	(0)
2020–2021	Dinamo Vranje	19	(0)
2021–2022	Rad	18	(0)
2022-2024	Sloboda Užice	37	(0)
2024-	Trayal Kruševac	59	(0)
- * Club domestic league appearances and goals as of 14 May 2026

Marko Stanojević (Serbian Cyrillic: Марко Станојевић; born 4 May 1997) is a Serbian footballer who plays as a defensive midfielder for Trayal Kruševac.

== Club career ==
=== Napredak Kruševac ===
Stanojević passed Napredak Kruševac youth academy. He has joined the first team for the 2014–15 season. He signed a two-year scholarship contract with club in summer 2015, but continued playing as a captain of youth team until 2016. He made his senior debut in 27 fixture match of 2015–16 Serbian First League season, against Sloga Petrovac, replacing Bohdan Sichkaruk in 63 minute of the match. In summer 2017, Stanojević signed a three-year professional contract with Napredak. In summer 2018, Stanojević released by the club.

==== Loan to Temnić ====
In summer 2016, Stanojević loaned at one-year dual registration to the Serbian League East side Temnić. During the 2016–17 campaign, Stanojević collected 24 appearances as a bonus player, helping the team to win the competition and make promotion to the Serbian First League. At the beginning of new season, Stanojević returned to the club at six-month loan deal. He was usually used the in first squad during the first half of the 2017–18 season, having ordered with number 10 jersey. In the mid-season, Stanojević extended a loan deal until the end of the 2017–18 Serbian First League campaign.

=== Dinamo Vranje & Trayal Kruševac ===
Stanojević joined Dinamo Vranje on 8 August 2018 where he played until the end of the year, before joining Trayal Kruševac in mid January 2019.

== Career statistics ==
As of 28 June 2018

Appearances and goals by club, season and competition
Club	Season	League			Cup		Continental		Other		Total	
Club	Season	Division	Apps	Goals	Apps	Goals	Apps	Goals	Apps	Goals	Apps	Goals
Napredak Kruševac	2014–15	Serbian SuperLiga	0	0	0	0	—		0	0	0	0
Napredak Kruševac	2015–16	Serbian First League	2	0	0	0	—		—		2	0
Napredak Kruševac	2016–17	Serbian SuperLiga	0	0	0	0	—		—		0	0
Napredak Kruševac	2017–18	Serbian SuperLiga	0	0	0	0	—		—		0	0
Napredak Kruševac	Total		2	0	0	0	—		0	0	2	0
Temnić (loan)	2016–17	Serbian League East	24	0	—		—		—		24	0
Temnić (loan)	2017–18	Serbian First League	24	0	—		—		—		24	0
Temnić (loan)	Total		48	0	—		—		—		48	0
Career total			50	0	0	0	—		0	0	50	0

== Honours ==
Napredak Kruševac

- Serbian First League: 2015–16

Temnić

- Serbian First League: 2016–17
