= Jovan Najdanović =

Serbian footballer (born 1997)

Personal information
- Date of birth: 20 January 1997 (age 29)
- Place of birth: Kragujevac, FR Yugoslavia
- Height: 1.90 m (6 ft 3 in)
- Position: Goalkeeper

Youth career
- Šumadija 1903
- Radnički Kragujevac

Senior career*
Years	Team	Apps	(Gls)
2015–2018	Radnički Kragujevac	10	(0)
2016	→ Sušica (loan)	9	(0)
2017	→ Zlatibor Čajetina (loan)	4	(0)
2019–2021	OFK Trnava		
- * Club domestic league appearances and goals as of 31 December 2017

Jovan Najdanović (Serbian Cyrillic: Јован Најдановић; born 20 January 1997) is a Serbian football goalkeeper.

== Club career ==
=== Radnički Kragujevac ===
Born in Kragujevac, Jovan started his youth career with local club Šumadija 1903, and later he moved to Radnički Kragujevac where he completed youth categories. Najdanović joined the first team of Radnički Kragujevac ending of 2014–15 season under coach Neško Milovanović after Miloš Vesić left the club and Žarko Trifunović missed some matches because of the yellow card accumulation. He was sitting on the bench as a reserve goalkeeper with number 97 jersey in 29 fixture match of the Serbian SuperLiga, against Jagodina. After Radnički relegated to the Serbian First League, Najdanović started the 2015–16 season as a reserve goalkeeper. He made his senior debut for the club in the 2nd fixture match against Sloga Petrovac na Mlavi after Marko Kostić got the red card. He also saved one penalty kick in a cup match against Bežanija, played on 28 October 2015. For the first fully pro season with the club, Najdanović collected 10 appearances, including 9 league and 1 cup match. During the first half of the 2016–17 season, Najdanović was loaned to Morava Zone League side Sušica. For the rest of season, he was mostly used as a back-up choice. In summer 2017, after he started the 2017–18 season as a back-up choice, Najdanović moved on six-month loan to Zlatibor Čajetina.

== Career statistics ==
As of 31 December 2017

Appearances and goals by club, season and competition
Club	Season	League			Cup		Continental		Other		Total	
Club	Season	Division	Apps	Goals	Apps	Goals	Apps	Goals	Apps	Goals	Apps	Goals
Radnički Kragujevac	2014–15	Serbian SuperLiga	0	0	—		—		—		0	0
Radnički Kragujevac	2015–16	Serbian First League	9	0	1	0	—		—		10	0
Radnički Kragujevac	2016–17	Serbian League West	1	0	—		—		2 (Note: Including Kragujevac City Cup match against Vodojaža and Western Serbia Cup match against Radnički Kovači)	0	3	0
Radnički Kragujevac	2017–18	Serbian First League	0	0	—		—		—		0	0
Radnički Kragujevac	Total		10	0	1	0	—		2	0	13	0
Sušica (loan)	2016–17	Morava Zone League	9	0	—		—		—		9	0
Zlatibor Čajetina (loan)	2017–18	Serbian League West	4	0	0	0	—		—		4	0
Career total			22	0	1	0	—		2	0	25	0

== Honours ==
Radnički Kragujevac

- Serbian League West: 2016–17
