= Darko Bulatović =

Montenegrin footballer

Personal information
- Date of birth: 5 September 1989 (age 37)
- Place of birth: Nikšić, SR Montenegro, Yugoslavia
- Height: 1.85 m (6 ft 1 in)
- Position: Left-back

Team information
- Current team: FK Internacional
- Number: 26

Youth career
- Sutjeska Nikšić
- –2006: OFK Beograd

Senior career*
Years	Team	Apps	(Gls)
2006–2010	Sutjeska Nikšić	88	(2)
2011–2012	Miedź Legnica	13	(1)
2011	→ Czarni Żagań (loan)	14	(0)
2012–2014	Čelik Nikšić	39	(1)
2014–2016	Radnički Niš	47	(1)
2016–2017	Čukarički	16	(0)
2017	KA	18	(1)
2018	Voždovac	13	(0)
2018–2021	Sutjeska Nikšić	88	(2)
2021–2023	Vllaznia Shkodër	44	(0)
2023	Kyzylzhar	9	(0)
2024	Sutjeska Nikšić	16	(0)
2024	KA	10	(0)
2025	Arsenal Tivat	13	(0)
2025–	FK Internacional	30	(3)

International career
2010	Montenegro U21	1	(0)
2019–2020	Montenegro	3	(0)
- * Club domestic league appearances and goals as of 18 June 2026

Darko Bulatović (Serbian Cyrillic: Дарко Булатовић; born 5 September 1989) is a Montenegrin professional footballer who plays as a left-back for FK Internacional.

== Club career ==
=== Early career ===
Born in Nikšić, Yugoslavia, Bulatović first began playing football with hometown club Sutjeska Nikšić, although he also played briefly for OFK Beograd's youth team before returning to Sutjeska and making his senior debut with them.

=== Radnički Niš ===
On 5 August 2014, Bulatović signed a one-year contract with Serbian club Radnički Niš. He ended up playing two season for Radnički Niš under coach Milan Rastavac. During his second season with the team, Bulatović played a total of 33 games and scored a goal, after which Radnički Niš finished in fifth place in the 2015–16 Serbian SuperLiga. After the 2015–16 season, Bulatović received offers from other clubs, including Sutjeska.

=== Čukarički ===
On 29 July 2016, Bulatović signed a two-year contract with Serbian club Čukarički, and was joined by teammate Marko Tomić who also joined Čukarički from Radnički Niš that summer.

=== Voždovac ===
Bulatović joined Serbian club Voždovac during the 2017–18 winter transfer window. However, he played only one season there.

=== Return to Sutjeska ===
On 16 June 2018, Bulatović returned to Sutjeska. On 23 September 2018, Bulatović scored a goal in a 2–1 win against Budućnost in the Montenegrin Derby. In his first season back at Sutjeska under coach Nikola Rakojević, the team finished in first place in the Montenegrin First League at the end of the 2018–19 season.

== International career ==
Before a friendly match between Montenegro and Turkey on 29 May 2016, Bulatović was initially named in Montenegro's provisional squad by coach Ljubiša Tumbaković. On 6 October 2019, Bulatović was called up to the Montenegro national team by coach Faruk Hadžibegić for two UEFA Euro 2020 qualifying matches against Bulgaria and Kosovo. On 14 October 2019, he made his debut for the Montenegro national team at a Euro 2020 qualifier against Kosovo, which Montenegro lost 2–0.

== Honours ==
Sutjeska Nikšić

- Montenegrin First League: 2018–19
