= Uroš Sekulić =

Serbian association football player

Personal information
- Date of birth: 10 February 1998 (age 28)
- Place of birth: Belgrade, FR Yugoslavia
- Height: 1.89 m (6 ft 2 in)
- Position: Centre-back

Youth career
- –2017: Brodarac
- 2017–2018: Borac Čačak

Senior career*
Years	Team	Apps	(Gls)
2017–2019	Borac Čačak	21	(0)
2018	→ Polet Ljubić (loan)	12	(0)
2019–2020	Triglav Kranj	0	(0)
2019	→ Bled (loan)	7	(0)
2020	Rad	0	(0)
2020–2021	Inđija	0	(0)
2021	Proleter Novi Sad	0	(0)
2022	Brodarac		
- * Club domestic league appearances and goals as of 19 May 2021

Uroš Sekulić (Serbian Cyrillic: Урош Секулић; born 10 February 1998) is a Serbian footballer.

== Career ==
On 8 August 2019, Sekulić joined NK Triglav Kranj. One month later, he was loaned out to NK Bled for the rest of 2019.

== Career statistics ==
As of 14 January 2020

Club	Season	League			Cup		Continental		Other		Total	
Club	Season	Division	Apps	Goals	Apps	Goals	Apps	Goals	Apps	Goals	Apps	Goals
Borac Čačak	2017–18	Serbian SuperLiga	1	0	0	0	—		—		1	0
Borac Čačak	2018–19	Serbian First League	20	0	2	0	—		—		22	0
Borac Čačak	Total		21	0	2	0	—		—		23	0
Polet Ljubić (loan)	2017–18	Serbian League West	12	0	0	0	—		—		12	0
Triglav Kranj	2019–20	Slovenian PrvaLiga	0	0	0	0	—		—		0	0
Bled (loan)	2019–20	Slovenian Third League	7	0	0	0	—		2 (Note: Appearances in MNZG-Kranj Regional Cup)	0	9	0
Career total			40	0	2	0	—		2	0	44	0
