= Nemanja Stojšić =

Serbian footballer

Personal information
- Full name: Nemanja Stojšić
- Date of birth: 1 February 1997 (age 29)
- Place of birth: Sremska Mitrovica, FR Yugoslavia
- Height: 1.79 m (5 ft 10 1/2 in)
- Position: Left wing-back

Team information
- Current team: Sloga Erdevik

Youth career
- –2013: Novi Sad
- 2014–2015: Hajduk Kula

Senior career*
Years	Team	Apps	(Gls)
2015–2016	Hajduk Novi Sad	0	(0)
2015–2016	→ Borac Novi Sad (loan)	24	(10)
2016–2018	Proleter Novi Sad	27	(1)
2017	→ Borac Novi Sad (loan)	12	(11)
2018–2019	Mladost Bački Jarak		
2019–2021	Sloga Erdevik		
2021	Sloga Temerin		
2022–	Sloga Erdevik		
- * Club domestic league appearances and goals as of 19 December 2017

Nemanja Stojšić (Serbian Cyrillic: Немања Стојшић; born 1 February 1997) is a Serbian footballer who plays for Sloga Erdevik.

== Club career ==
Born in Sremska Mitrovica, Stojšić was with RFK Novi Sad football academy in his early years. Later he moved to OFK Hajduk, where he completed his youth career. After the club residence moved to Novi Sad, Stojšić was loaned to the local club Borac, where he appeared in Novi Sad-Srem Zone League during the 2015–16 season. In summer 2016 he moved to Serbian First League side Proleter Novi Sad and after passed a trial period, he signed with club for the 2016–17 season. Stojšić collected 28 matches with 1 goal in both domestic competitions for his first season with the club. After he started new season a reserve option with Proleter under coach Zoran Govedarica, Stojšić left the club for the six-month period and returned on loan deal to Borac Novi Sad.

== Career statistics ==
As of 19 December 2017

Appearances and goals by club, season and competition
Club	Season	League			Cup		Continental		Other		Total	
Club	Season	Division	Apps	Goals	Apps	Goals	Apps	Goals	Apps	Goals	Apps	Goals
Borac Novi Sad (loan)	2015–16	Novi Sad-Srem Zone League	24	10	—		—		—		24	10
Borac Novi Sad (loan)	2017–18	Vojvodina League South	12	11	—		—		0	0	12	11
Borac Novi Sad (loan)	Total		36	21	—		—		0	0	36	21
Proleter Novi Sad	2016–17	Serbian First League	27	1	1	0	—		—		28	1
Proleter Novi Sad	2017–18	Serbian First League	0	0	—		—		—		0	0
Proleter Novi Sad	Total		27	1	1	0	—		—		28	1
Career total			63	22	1	0	—		0	0	64	22
