= Jonas Asare =

Ghanaian football forward

Personal information
- Date of birth: 10 July 1997 (age 29)
- Place of birth: Accra, Ghana
- Height: 1.69 m (5 ft 7 in)
- Position: Forward

Senior career*
Years	Team	Apps	(Gls)
2015–2016	Grassland FC		
2017	Javor Ivanjica	9	(0)
- * Club domestic league appearances and goals as of 2 June 2017

Jonas Asare (born 10 July 1997) is a Ghanaian professional football who last played as a forward for Serbian SuperLiga club Javor Ivanjica.

== Career ==
Asare played with Grassland FC in Cameroon in the seasons 2015 and 2016, before arriving to Serbia during winter break of the 2016–17 season and signing with top—league side Javor Ivanjica . Asare signed contract with Javor until June 2020. He made his debut in the 2016–17 Serbian SuperLiga on 13 April, in a game against Radnički Niš. Asare was released by Javor in December 2017.
