= Kristijan Živković =

Serbian footballer

Personal information
- Full name: Kristijan Živković
- Date of birth: 21 February 1999 (age 27)
- Place of birth: Požarevac, FR Yugoslavia
- Height: 1.79 m (5 ft 10 in)
- Position: Winger

Team information
- Current team: VGSK Veliko Gradište

Youth career
- Vojvodina

Senior career*
Years	Team	Apps	(Gls)
2017–2019	Vojvodina	5	(0)
2018	→ ČSK Čelarevo (loan)	6	(1)
2018	→ Jagodina Tabane (loan)	15	(3)
2019–2020	Mladi Radnik		
2020–2021	Radnički Niš	20	(0)
2021–2022	Jagodina		
2022–2023	RFK Novi Sad	27	(5)
2023–2024	Mladost GAT	18	(1)
2024	Jagodina		
2025-	VGSK Veliko Gradište		

International career
2017	Serbia U18	5	(1)
2017	Serbia U19	5	(0)
- * Club domestic league appearances and goals as of 26 December 2023

Kristijan Živković (Serbian Cyrillic: Кристијан Живковић; born 21 February 1999) is a Serbian footballer who plays for VGSK Veliko Gradište after leaving now defunct Mladost GAT.

== Club career ==
=== Vojvodina ===
Born in Požarevac, Živković came through the Vojvodina youth academy. He appeared with the club on "Future Talents Cup", and the "Tournament of Friendship" in 2015, being one of the most effective players. He was also elected for the best player of the tournament "Brodarac 2016".

On 28 June 2017, Živković signed his first professional contract, penning a four-year deal with the club. Passing the complete pre-season with the first team, Živković made his official debut for the club in 2–0 away loss to MFK Ružomberok in second leg of the first qualifying round for 2017–18 UEFA Europa League. He also made his Serbian SuperLiga debut on 21 July 2017, in 1–0 home win against Čukarički.

== International career ==
At the beginning of 2017, Živković was invited in selective camp for Serbian under-18 national level under coach Miloš Velebit. Živković made his debut for the team replacing Jug Stanojev in a match against Uzbekistan on 18 April 2017. He scored his first goal for the team in 3–0 victory against France on 3 June 2017.

== Career statistics ==
As of 13 March 2019

Club	Season	League			Cup		Continental		Other		Total	
Club	Season	Division	Apps	Goals	Apps	Goals	Apps	Goals	Apps	Goals	Apps	Goals
Vojvodina	2017–18	Serbian SuperLiga	5	0	0	0	1	0	—		6	0
Vojvodina	2018–19	Serbian SuperLiga	0	0	1	0	0	0	—		1	0
Vojvodina	Total		5	0	1	0	1	0	—		7	0
ČSK Čelarevo (loan)	2017–18	Serbian First League	6	1	0	0	0	0	—		6	1
Jagodina Tabane (loan)	2018–19	Serbian League East	15	3	—		—		—		15	3
Mladi Radnik	2019–20	Serbian League West	0	0	—		—		—		0	0
Career total			26	4	0	0	1	0	—		27	4
