= Maksim Artemchuk =

Russian football player

Personal information
- Full name: Maksim Aleksandrovich Artemchuk
- Date of birth: 9 August 1999 (age 27)
- Place of birth: Saint Petersburg, Russia
- Height: 1.89 m (6 ft 2 in)
- Position: Forward

Senior career*
Years	Team	Apps	(Gls)
2017–2018	Dynamo-2 Saint Petersburg	2	(1)
2018	→ Proleter Novi Sad (loan)	5	(0)
2018	PFC Sochi	0	(0)
2019	Zlatibor Čajetina	13	(2)
2020	FC Kolomna	5	(3)
2020–2021	Neftekhimik Nizhnekamsk	12	(1)
2021–2022	Baltika-BFU Kaliningrad	18	(4)
2022–2023	Baltika Kaliningrad	2	(0)
2022	→ Dynamo Brest (loan)	15	(2)
2023	Baltika-BFU Kaliningrad	7	(0)
- * Club domestic league appearances and goals as of 10 June 2023

Maksim Aleksandrovich Artemchuk (Russian: Максим Александрович Артемчук; born 9 August 1999) is a Russian former football player.

== Club career ==
He made his debut in the Russian Professional Football League for FC Dynamo-2 Saint Petersburg on 19 July 2017 in a game against FC Torpedo Vladimir. During the winter-break of 2017–18 he was loaned to Serbian club FK Proleter Novi Sad playing in the Serbian First League, Serbian second tier.

On 28 June 2022, Artemchuk was loaned to Dynamo Brest in Belarus until the end of 2022.

== Honours ==
Proleter Novi Sad

- Serbian First League: 2017–18
