= Yang Chenyu =

Chinese association football player

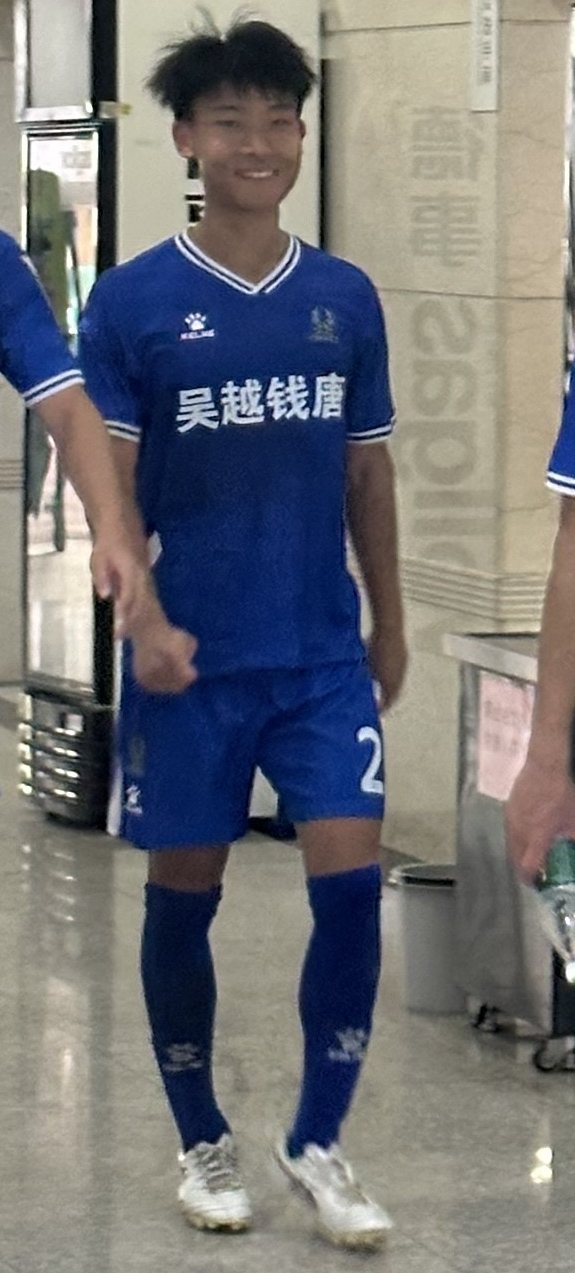
- Yang Chenyu in June 2025

Personal information
- Date of birth: 8 June 1999 (age 27)
- Place of birth: Shijiazhuang, Hebei, China
- Height: 1.76 m (5 ft 9 in)
- Position: Defender

Team information
- Current team: Hangzhou Linping Wuyue
- Number: 2

Youth career
- –2019: Hebei China Fortune
- 2018: → Radnički Pirot (loan)

Senior career*
Years	Team	Apps	(Gls)
2018–2022	Hebei FC	8	(0)
2018	→ Radnički Pirot (loan)	1	(0)
2021	→ Yanbian Longding (loan)	20	(2)
2023-	Hangzhou Linping Wuyue	41	(2)
- * Club domestic league appearances and goals as of 14:01, 21 January 2020 (UTC)

Yang Chenyu (Chinese: 杨辰禹; born 8 June 1999) is a Chinese footballer currently playing as a defender for Hangzhou Linping Wuyue.

== Career statistics ==
=== Club ===
As of 21 January 2020.

Club	Season	League			Cup		Continental		Other		Total	
Club	Season	Division	Apps	Goals	Apps	Goals	Apps	Goals	Apps	Goals	Apps	Goals
Hebei China Fortune	2018	Chinese Super League	0	0	0	0	–		0	0	0	0
Hebei China Fortune	2019	Chinese Super League	0	0	0	0	–		0	0	0	0
Hebei China Fortune	Total		0	0	0	0	0	0	0	0	0	0
Radnički Pirot	2017–18	Serbian First League	1	0	0	0	–		0	0	1	0
Career total			1	0	0	0	0	0	0	0	1	0
