= Marko Bašanović =

Serbian footballer

Personal information
- Full name: Marko Bašanović
- Date of birth: 26 September 1994 (age 32)
- Place of birth: Belgrade, FR Yugoslavia
- Height: 1.82 m (5 ft 11 1/2 in)
- Position: Left-back

Youth career
- Rad

Senior career*
Years	Team	Apps	(Gls)
2011–2012	Železničar Beograd		
2012–2013	Železnik	13	(0)
2013	Lokomotiva Beograd	13	(0)
2014	Sopot	10	(1)
2014–2015	IM Rakovica	24	(0)
2015–2016	Rad	10	(0)
2016–2017	Spartak Subotica	21	(0)
2017–2018	OFK Bačka	5	(0)
2018–2019	Bežanija	22	(1)
2019	Zvijezda 09	8	(0)
2019	Zlatibor Čajetina	2	(0)
2019–2020	Železničar Pančevo		
2020	Brodarac		
2021	BASK		
2021–2022	Hajduk Beograd		
2022–2023	KFK Ravna Gora		
- * Club domestic league appearances and goals as of 23:14, 5 December 2019 (UTC)

Marko Bašanović (Serbian Cyrillic: Марко Башановић; born 26 September 1994) is a Serbian professional footballer who plays as a defender.

== Career ==
Born in Belgrade, Bašanović is a product of Rad's youth school. He played for Železničar Beograd, Železnik, Lokomotiva Beograd, Sopot and IM Rakovica. In summer 2015 he returned Rad. After a season with Rad, Bašanović moved to Spartak Subotica next year.
