= Predrag Stanimirović =

Serbian footballer

Personal information
- Full name: Predrag Stanimirović
- Date of birth: 9 September 1995 (age 31)
- Place of birth: Belgrade, FR Yugoslavia
- Height: 1.80 m (5 ft 11 in)
- Position: Right-back

Team information
- Current team: Dinamo Pančevo
- Number: 22

Youth career
- –2013: Partizan

Senior career*
Years	Team	Apps	(Gls)
2013–2014	Dinamo Pančevo	16	(1)
2014–2016	Voždovac	10	(0)
2015	→ Sinđelić Beograd (loan)	15	(0)
2016–2017	Sinđelić Beograd	21	(1)
2017	Dinamo Pančevo	1	(0)
2018–2019	Zemun	11	(0)
2019–2020	Smederevo 1924	19	(0)
2020–2022	Železničar Pančevo	46	(2)
2022	Radnički Beograd	7	(0)
2023	Vítkovice	10	(0)
2023–2024	Omladinac Novi Banovci	7	(0)
2024–	Dinamo Pančevo		
- * Club domestic league appearances and goals as of 12:47, 8 January 2020 (UTC)

Predrag Stanimirović (Serbian Cyrillic: Предраг Станимировић; born 9 September 1995) is a Serbian footballer, who plays as a defender for Dinamo Pančevo.

== Career ==
Stanimirović joined FK Smederevo 1924 in February 2019. He joined Dinamo Pančevo in September 2024, after having played for Novi Banovci.
