= Žarko Jeličić =

Serbian footballer

Personal information
- Date of birth: 12 October 1983 (age 43)
- Place of birth: Belgrade, SFR Yugoslavia
- Height: 1.82 m (6 ft 0 in)
- Position: Midfielder

Senior career*
Years	Team	Apps	(Gls)
2001–2002	Radnički Pirot	19	(10)
2002–2003	Koper	12	(4)
2003–2004	Mura	29	(3)
2004–2005	Radnički Pirot		
2005–2006	Kastoria	20	(1)
2006–2007	Radnički Pirot	30	(1)
2007–2010	Antwerp	79	(8)
2010–2011	Waasland-Beveren	12	(1)
2011	Zemun	2	(0)
2012	Donji Srem	19	(1)
2013	TOT	15	(1)
2013	Sopot	10	(1)
2014	Radnički Nova Pazova	6	(1)
2014	Brodarac 1947	13	(2)
2015–2018	Budućnost Dobanovci	73	(11)
2018	Proleter Novi Sad	3	(0)
2018–2020	Budućnost Dobanovci	26	(1)

Managerial career
- 2022–2024: Budućnost Dobanovci
- * Club domestic league appearances and goals

Žarko Jeličić (Serbian Cyrillic: Жарко Јеличић; born 12 October 1983) is a Serbian retired footballer who played as a forward.
