= Filip Božić =

Bosnian-Herzegovinian footballer

Personal information
- Date of birth: 9 March 1999 (age 27)
- Place of birth: Paraćin, FR Yugoslavia
- Height: 1.74 m (5 ft 8 1/2 in)
- Position: Midfielder

Team information
- Current team: OFK Beograd

Youth career
- –2017: OFK Beograd
- 2017: Partizan

Senior career*
Years	Team	Apps	(Gls)
2018–2021	Mačva Šabac	38	(3)
2018	→ Sloga Požega (loan)		
2021	Grafičar Beograd	5	(0)
2021–	OFK Beograd		

International career
2016	Bosnia and Herzegovina U17		
2017	Bosnia and Herzegovina U19	2	(0)
- * Club domestic league appearances and goals as of 3 April 2021

Filip Božić (Serbian Cyrillic: Филип Божић; born 9 March 1999) is a Bosnian-Herzegovinian football midfielder who plays for Serbian club OFK Beograd.

== Club career ==
Born in Paraćin, Filip Božić played in OFK Beograd academy. Later, in summer 2017, he signed with FK Partizan where he played in the youth team. During winter-break of the 2017–18 season he signed with FK Mačva Šabac.

== International career ==
Despite having been born in Paraćin, Serbia, he decided to represent Bosnia and Herzegovina internationally having debuted for their under 17 team in 2016.
