= Maxwell Mensah =

Ghanaian footballer (born 1997)

Personal information
- Full name: George Maxwell Mensah
- Date of birth: 10 January 1997 (age 29)
- Place of birth: Accra, Ghana
- Height: 1.78 m (5 ft 10 in)
- Position: Midfielder

Team information
- Current team: Castelvetro Calcio

Youth career
- 2015: Sampdoria
- 2016: Sorrento
- 2016: FC Santo Agnello

Senior career*
Years	Team	Apps	(Gls)
2016	Taranto	0	(0)
2016–2017	Vastese	29	(0)
2018	Temnić Varvarin	15	(0)
2018–	Castelvetro Calcio	18	(0)
- * Club domestic league appearances and goals as of 14:13, 20 July 2019 (UTC)

George Maxwell Mensah (born 10 January 1997) is a Ghanaian footballer who plays as a midfielder for Castelvetro Calcio.

== Career ==
Born in Ghanaian capital city of Accra Mensah grew up with his mother, sister and two brothers. As a child he started playing football at age 14 in the Accra football school. Here he was noticed by a Ghanaian prosecutor, who had contacts with Italian agents. From there began his adventure in Europe. In January 2015, Mensah left his family and Ghana and moved to Italy by plane. His first audition was with the Primavera team of Sampdoria, followed by the transfer to Sorrento. He was registered by Taranto but made no appearances because of bureaucratic problems. In between he was registered for the youth team of Santo Agnello. Pino De Filippis discovered him and brought him to Vastese thus Mensah becoming one of the biggest talents of Group F. He became new player of Vastese at late August 2016. He made 29 appearances for Vastese in 2016–17.

During winter break of 2017–18 season, he joined FK Temnić Lipa Varvarin playing in the Serbian First League.

In summer 2018 he return to Italy and joined Castelvetro Calcio.
