= Filip Vorotović =

Montenegrin footballer

Personal information
- Full name: Filip Vorotović
- Date of birth: 8 March 1998 (age 28)
- Place of birth: Nikšić, FR Yugoslavia
- Height: 1.81 m (5 ft 11 1/2 in)
- Position: Forward

Youth career
- –2014: Sutjeska Nikšić
- 2014–2015: Partizan
- 2017: Olimpija Ljubljana

Senior career*
Years	Team	Apps	(Gls)
2015–2016	Sutjeska Nikšić	6	(0)
2016	→ OSK Igalo (loan)		
2016	Teleoptik	9	(3)
2017	Olimpija Ljubljana	0	(0)
2017	Borac Čačak	1	(0)
2018	Spartak Subotica	0	(0)
2018	Iskra Danilovgrad	11	(0)
2019	Teleoptik	11	(1)

International career
2014	Montenegro U17	3	(0)
2016	Montenegro U19	1	(1)
- * Club domestic league appearances and goals as of 15 April 2019

Filip Vorotović (Cyrillic: Филип Воротовић, born 8 March 1998) is a Montenegrin footballer who most recently played as a forward for the Serbian SuperLiga side FK Teleoptik.

== Club career ==
In 2014, he joined Partizan. He returned to his hometown club Sutjeska Nikšić the following year. He played with FK Teleoptik in the first half of the 2016–17 Serbian League Belgrade.

On 10 February 2017, he joined Slovenian side Olimpija Ljubljana but failed to make any appearance in the Slovenian PrvaLiga.

In summer 2017 he returned to Serbia and signed with top league side Borac Čačak.

On 14 February 2018, Vorotović officially promoted as a new member of Spartak Subotica, penning a three-and-a-half-year deal with the club.
