= Filip Osman =

Serbian footballer

Personal information
- Full name: Filip Osman
- Date of birth: 21 December 1991 (age 34)
- Place of birth: Belgrade, SFR Yugoslavia
- Height: 1.85 m (6 ft 1 in)
- Position: Midfielder

Team information
- Current team: FK Železničar Inđija

Youth career
- Partizan

Senior career*
Years	Team	Apps	(Gls)
2009–2011	Voždovac	31	(1)
2011	→ Radnički Kragujevac (loan)	0	(0)
2011–2012	Slavija Sarajevo	14	(0)
2012–2013	Smederevo	21	(0)
2013–2014	Slavija Sarajevo	22	(0)
2014–2015	BASK	2	(0)
2016–2018	Bežanija	41	(0)
2018–2019	Budućnost Dobanovci	33	(0)
2019	Sinđelić Beograd	9	(0)
2019–2020	Kolubara	20	(0)
2020	Sileks	3	(0)
2020	Dinamo Pančevo		
2021	FK 1. Maj Ruma		
2022	Omladinac Novi Banovci		
2022–	FK Železničar Inđija		
- * Club domestic league appearances and goals as of 21:18, 12 January 2021 (UTC)

Filip Osman (Serbian Cyrillic: Филип Осман; born 21 December 1991) is a Serbian football midfielder who plays for FK Železničar Inđija.
