= List of football competitions in Slovenia =

This is a list of the main domestic association football competitions in Slovenia, most of which were established in 1991 by the Football Association of Slovenia.

== League competitions ==
Slovenian PrvaLiga

The top tier division is contested annually by ten teams. The winners qualify for the UEFA Champions League, while the second and third-placed teams qualify for the UEFA Conference League. The most successful team is Maribor with 16 titles as of 2026.

Slovenian Second League

The second-tier league, also known as the 2. SNL, is contested by sixteen teams. The winners are automatically promoted to the PrvaLiga and the two bottom-placed teams are relegated to the 3. SNL.

Slovenian Third League

The third level of Slovenian football, also known as the 3. SNL, comprises two regional leagues (East and West). This is the lowest level managed by the Football Association of Slovenia.

Slovenian Regional Leagues / Intercommunal Leagues

The fourth, fifth and sixth tier of the Slovenian league system, run by the Intercommunal Football Associations of MNZ Celje, MNZ Nova Gorica, MNZ Koper, MNZG-Kranj, MNZ Lendava, MNZ Ljubljana, MNZ Maribor, MNZ Murska Sobota, and MNZ Ptuj.

== Cup competitions ==
Slovenian Cup

The national cup of Slovenia is contested by 120 teams in the first round. The winners qualify for the following season's UEFA Europa League. The most successful team is Maribor with nine trophies as of 2026.

Slovenian Supercup

The Supercup was a one-off annual match between the PrvaLiga champions and Slovenian Cup winners. Maribor is the most successful team with four Supercup titles. The competition was abolished after the 2015 edition.

== Women's competitions ==
Slovenian Women's League

The top level women's league, contested by eleven teams. The winners qualify for the UEFA Women's Champions League. The most successful club is Mura with 13 titles as of 2026.

Slovenian Women's Cup

Knock-out competition, contested by all women's clubs. The most successful club is Mura with 12 trophies as of 2026.

== See also ==
- Football in Slovenia
