= Jovan Zucović =

Serbian footballer

Personal information
- Full name: Jovan Zucović
- Date of birth: 17 April 1990 (age 36)
- Place of birth: Kraljevo, SFR Yugoslavia
- Height: 1.86 m (6 ft 1 in)
- Position: Centre back

Youth career
- Red Star Belgrade

Senior career*
Years	Team	Apps	(Gls)
2008	Smederevo	0	(0)
2009–2010	Železničar Smederevo	27	(0)
2011	Sloboda Čačak	5	(0)
2011	→ Balkan Mirijevo (loan)	8	(0)
2012	Jedinstvo Ub	9	(0)
2012	Sinđelić Beograd	1	(0)
2013–2014	Partizan Bumbarevo Brdo	31	(1)
2014–2015	Sloga Kraljevo	16	(0)
2015	Stepojevac Vaga	9	(0)
2016	Dinamo Vranje	21	(0)
2017	Balkan Malmö	5	(0)
2018	Dinamo Vranje	12	(0)
2020	Ulaanbaatar City		
2022	FC Ulaanbaatar		
- * Club domestic league appearances and goals

Jovan Zucović (Serbian Cyrillic: Јован Зуцовић; born 17 April 1990) is a Serbian footballer who last played as a defender for Ulaanbaatar City.

== Career ==
In January 2020, Zucović joined Ulaanbaatar City in Mongolia under newly hired Serbian coach Vojislav Bralušić.
