= Li Shuaihu =

Chinese association football player

Personal information
- Date of birth: 10 February 1999 (age 27)
- Place of birth: Wuhan, Hubei, China
- Height: 1.76 m (5 ft 9 in)
- Position: Midfielder

Youth career
- Villarreal
- –2021: Hebei FC
- 2018: → Radnički Pirot (loan)

Senior career*
| Years | Team | Apps | (Gls) |
| 2021 | Hebei FC | 0 | (0) |
| 2021 | → Inner Mongolia Caoshangfei (loan) | 15 | (1) |
- * Club domestic league appearances and goals as of 14:01, 1 June 2022 (UTC)

Li Shuaihu (Chinese: 李帅虎; born 10 February 1999) is a Chinese footballer who plays as a midfielder.

== Club career ==
Li joined China League Two side Inner Mongolia Caoshangfei on loan from Hebei FC in 2021. He recorded his first assist in a 2–0 win over Xi'an Wolves.

== Career statistics ==
=== Club ===
As of 1 June 2022.

| Club | Season | League | | | Cup | | Continental | | Other | | Total | |
| Club | Season | Division | Apps | Goals | Apps | Goals | Apps | Goals | Apps | Goals | Apps | Goals |
|---|---|---|---|---|---|---|---|---|---|---|---|---|
| Hebei FC | 2021 | Chinese Super League | 0 | 0 | 0 | 0 | – | | 0 | 0 | 0 | 0 |
| Inner Mongolia Caoshangfei (loan) | 2021 | China League Two | 15 | 1 | 1 | 0 | – | | 0 | 0 | 16 | 1 |
| Career total | | | 15 | 1 | 1 | 0 | 0 | 0 | 0 | 0 | 16 | 1 |
