= Grassland FC =

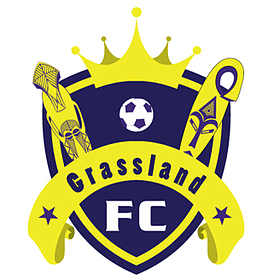
FC Grassland

Grassland FC Nkwen in Bamenda is a professional football club in the north west region of Cameroon, presently playing in the regional second division championship. The club was founded in 2012 with the aim to help young talented players in the Nkwen community to develop and produce a football team in the Northwest Region that will practice standard football.

Grassland FC became the regional third division champions after beating Highland FC of Santa 2–0 at the finals of a round rubbing tournament involving some eight teams from Mezam division and seven from Momo making a total of fifteen teams.
