= FK Budućnost Dobanovci =

Serbian football club

Budućnost Dobanovci
- Full name: FK Budućnost Dobanovci
- Founded: 1920; 106 years ago
- Ground: Stadion FK Budućnost
- Capacity: 1,500
- President: Mane Smiljanić
- Head coach: Dejan Mitrović
- League: Serbian League Belgrade
- 2024–25: Belgrade Zone League, 2nd of 14 (promoted)
Home colours	Away colours

FK Budućnost Dobanovci (Serbian Cyrillic: ФК Будућност Добановци) is a football club based in Dobanovci, Belgrade, Serbia. They compete in the Serbian League Belgrade, the third tier of the national league system.

== History ==
Founded in 1920, the club won the Serbian League Belgrade in the 2015–16 season and took promotion to the Serbian First League. They finished 10th in their first appearance in the second tier of Serbian football. The club subsequently made its Serbian Cup debut in the 2017–18 campaign, upsetting Voždovac in the first round on penalties. They eventually exited the competition in the next round following a 6–1 loss to Vojvodina. After spending six seasons in the Serbian First League, the club suffered relegation to the Serbian League Belgrade in 2022.

== Honours ==
- Serbian League Belgrade (Tier 3)
  - 2015–16
- Belgrade Zone League (Tier 4)
  - 2011–12

== Seasons ==
Season	League									Cup
Season	Division	Pld	W	D	L	GF	GA	Pts	Pos	Cup
Serbia and Montenegro
2004–05	3 – Belgrade	34	10	8	16	35	53	35 (Note: The club was docked three points.)	16th	—
2005–06	3 – Belgrade	38	13	7	18	43	60	46	17th	—
Serbia
2006–07	3 – Belgrade	34	5	6	23	17	56	19 (Note: The club was docked two points.)	18th	—
2007–08	4 – Belgrade	34	12	8	14	47	52	44	11th	—
2008–09	4 – Belgrade	34	10	12	12	41	35	42	9th	—
2009–10	4 – Belgrade	34	13	6	15	46	49	45	9th	—
2010–11	4 – Belgrade	34	15	8	11	54	38	53	5th	—
2011–12	4 – Belgrade	34	22	3	9	63	32	69	1st	—
2012–13	3 – Belgrade	30	12	6	12	51	46	42	7th	—
2013–14	3 – Belgrade	30	11	6	13	48	55	39	12th	—
2014–15	3 – Belgrade	30	10	3	17	33	37	33	12th	—
2015–16	3 – Belgrade	30	17	9	4	53	30	60	1st	—
2016–17	2	30	10	7	13	32	43	37	10th	—
2017–18	2	30	9	11	10	33	33	38	10th	Round of 16
2018–19	2	37	13	9	15	35	41	32	10th	Round of 16
2019–20	2	30 (Note: The season was shortened due to the COVID-19 pandemic in Serbia.)	5	7	18	21	41	22	15th	Round of 32
2020–21	2	34	14	8	12	39	37	50	8th	Preliminary round
2021–22	2	37	11	12	14	40	49	45	13th	Round of 32
2022–23	3 – Belgrade	30	10	10	10	35	29	40	6th	Preliminary round
2023–24	3 – Belgrade	30	10	9	11	38	47	33 (Note: The club was docked six points.)	13th	—
2024–25	4 – Belgrade	26	18	3	5	86	22	57	2nd	—

== Notable players ==
This is a list of players who have played at full international level.

- (Liberia) Omega Roberts

For a list of all FK Budućnost Dobanovci players with a Wikipedia article, see Category:FK Budućnost Dobanovci players.

== Historical list of coaches ==
- (Serbia) Ivica Šimičić (2015–2017)
- (Serbia) Saša Štrbac (2018)
- (Serbia) Slađan Nikolić (2018)
- (Serbia) Bogdan Korak (2018)
- (Serbia) Igor Spasić (2018–2019)
- (Serbia) Saša Štrbac (2019)
- (Serbia) Slavko Matić (2019)
- (Serbia) Goran Dragoljić (2019)
- (Serbia) Dušan Kljajić (2020)
- (Serbia) Dragan Stevanović (2020)
- (Serbia) Dragan Ivanović (2021)
- (Serbia) Vladica Petrović (2021)
- (Serbia) Milan Kuljić (14 Sep 2021–2022)
- (Serbia) Branko Smiljanić (2022)
- (Serbia) Dragan Stevanović (2022)
- (Serbia) Žarko Jeličić (2022–2024)
- (Serbia) Goran Janković (2024)
