= 2017–18 Serbian First League =

Serbian First League
- Season: 2017–18
- Champions: Proleter
- Promoted: Proleter, Dinamo
- Relegated: Radnički Pirot, Temnić 1924, ČSK, Jagodina
- Matches played: 240
- Goals scored: 551 (2.3 per match)
- Top goalscorer: Zakaria Suraka (Dinamo), 17 goals
- Biggest home win: TSC 7–0 Temnić 1924 (31 May 2018)
- Biggest away win: Jagodina 0–3 Radnički 1923 (9 September 2017); Radnički 0–3 Metalac (1 October 2017); Bežanija 0–3 Teleoptik (25 November 2017); ČSK 0–3 Sinđelić(10 March 2018); Sinđelić 0–3 Proleter (6 May 2018); Radnički 1923 0–3 Dinamo (31 May 2018); Sloboda 0–3 Radnički Pirot(31 May 2018)
- Highest scoring: Radnički 3–5 Dinamo (16 September 2017)

The Serbian First League (Serbian: Prva liga Srbije) is the second-highest football league in Serbia. The league is operated by the Serbian FA. 16 teams compete in the league for the 2017–18 season. Two teams will be promoted to the Serbian SuperLiga. Four teams will be relegated to the Serbian League, the third-highest division overall in the Serbian football league system. Bratstvo Prigrevica, the winner of 2016–17 Serbian League Vojvodina decided to forfeit its promotion, as did the second-placed Omladinac Novi Banovci. As a consequence, third-placed TSC took the vacant place. The season begun in August 2017 and will end in May 2018.

== Team changes ==
The following teams have changed division since the 2016–17 season.

=== To First League ===
Promoted from Serbian League

- Teleoptik
- Temnić 1924
- TSC
- Radnički 1923

Relegated from Serbian SuperLiga

- Metalac
- Novi Pazar

=== From First League ===
Relegated to Serbian League

- Kolubara
- BSK Borča
- OFK Odžaci
- OFK Beograd

Promoted to Serbian SuperLiga

- Mačva Šabac
- Zemun

== 2017–18 teams ==
Location of teams in the 2017–18 Serbian First league

| Team | City | Stadium | Capacity | Kit manufacturer | Shirt Sponsor |
|---|---|---|---|---|---|
| Bežanija | Belgrade | Stadion FK Bežanija | 4,000 | Sportika | |
| Budućnost Dobanovci | Belgrade | Stadion FK Budućnost | 1,000 | Legea | |
| ČSK Čelarevo | Čelarevo | Stadion Pivare | 3,000 | NAAI | |
| Dinamo Vranje | Vranje | Stadion Yumco | 4,000 | Nike | |
| Inđija | Inđija | Stadion FK Inđija | 4,500 | Jako | ZUTI Market |
| Jagodina | Jagodina | Jagodina City Stadium | 15,000 | Legea | |
| Metalac Gornji Milanovac | Gornji Milanovac | Stadion Metalac | 4,400 | Image Sport | Metalac a.d. |
| Novi Pazar | Novi Pazar | Novi Pazar City Stadium | 13,000 | Givova | |
| Proleter Novi Sad | Novi Sad | Stadion Slana Bara | 2,000 | Umbro | |
| Radnički Kragujevac | Kragujevac | Čika Dača Stadium | 15,100 | NAAI | Grad Kragujevac |
| Radnički Pirot | Pirot | Stadion Dragan Nikolić | 13,816 | Asics | Tigar Tyres |
| Sinđelić Beograd | Belgrade | Stadion FK Sinđelić | 1,500 | NAAI | AMS Osiguranje |
| Sloboda Užice | Užice | Užice City Stadium | 12,000 | NAAI | UNITRAG |
| Teleoptik | Zemun | SC Partizan-Teleoptik | 5,000 | Adidas | |
| TSC | Bačka Topola | Bačka Topola City Stadium | 5,000 | Adidas | SAT-TRAKT Communications |
| Temnić 1924 | Varvarin | Mičetov stadion (Kruševac) | 1,500 | M-Sport | MAK 037 Trade d.o.o. |

== League table ==
| Pos | Team | Pld | W | D | L | GF | GA | GD | Pts | Promotion or relegation |
|---|---|---|---|---|---|---|---|---|---|---|
| 1 | Proleter Novi Sad (C, P) | 30 | 20 | 5 | 5 | 63 | 25 | +38 | 65 | Promotion to the Serbian SuperLiga |
| 2 | Dinamo Vranje (P) | 30 | 20 | 3 | 7 | 47 | 24 | +23 | 63 | Promotion to the Serbian SuperLiga |
| 3 | Metalac Gornji Milanovac | 30 | 17 | 6 | 7 | 43 | 21 | +22 | 57 | |
| 4 | TSC | 30 | 15 | 9 | 6 | 49 | 22 | +27 | 54 | |
| 5 | Inđija | 30 | 12 | 9 | 9 | 30 | 25 | +5 | 45 | |
| 6 | Sinđelić Beograd | 30 | 13 | 6 | 11 | 31 | 32 | −1 | 45 | |
| 7 | Bežanija | 30 | 11 | 11 | 8 | 35 | 32 | +3 | 44 | |
| 8 | Teleoptik | 30 | 10 | 10 | 10 | 39 | 32 | +7 | 40 | |
| 9 | Novi Pazar | 30 | 9 | 13 | 8 | 28 | 33 | −5 | 40 | |
| 10 | Budućnost Dobanovci | 30 | 9 | 11 | 10 | 33 | 33 | 0 | 38 | |
| 11 | Radnički 1923 | 30 | 10 | 6 | 14 | 32 | 39 | −7 | 36 | |
| 12 | Sloboda Užice | 30 | 9 | 7 | 14 | 23 | 35 | −12 | 34 | |
| 13 | Radnički Pirot (R) | 30 | 8 | 7 | 15 | 28 | 39 | −11 | 31 | Relegation to the Serbian League |
| 14 | Temnić 1924 (R) | 30 | 6 | 8 | 16 | 24 | 47 | −23 | 26 | Relegation to the Serbian League |
| 15 | ČSK (R) | 30 | 4 | 10 | 16 | 30 | 53 | −23 | 22 | Relegation to the Serbian League |
| 16 | Jagodina (Note: Due to not paying agreed transfer fee Jagodina received 6 points deduction.) (R) | 30 | 3 | 7 | 20 | 16 | 59 | −43 | 10 | Relegation to the Serbian League |

Source: Football Association of Serbia (in Serbian)
Rules for classification: 1) points; 2) head-to-head points; 3) head-to-head goal difference; 4) head-to-head goals scored; 5) goal difference; 6) number of goals scored.
(C) Champions; (P) Promoted; (R) Relegated

== Results ==
| Home \ Away | BEŽ | BDO | ČSK | DVR | INĐ | JAG | MET | NPZ | PNS | RDK | RPI | SIN | SUŽ | TLO | TEM | TSC |
|---|---|---|---|---|---|---|---|---|---|---|---|---|---|---|---|---|
| Bežanija | | 2–0 | 3–1 | 1–2 | 0–0 | 2–0 | 0–1 | 2–0 | 0–0 | 3–2 | 1–0 | 1–0 | 4–0 | 0–3 | 0–0 | 2–1 |
| Budućnost Dobanovci | 1–1 | | 1–1 | 1–2 | 1–0 | 4–0 | 0–0 | 1–1 | 1–3 | 2–0 | 3–1 | 0–3 | 1–0 | 1–1 | 1–0 | 2–1 |
| ČSK Čelarevo | 0–0 | 2–2 | | 0–1 | 1–1 | 5–1 | 1–3 | 2–2 | 1–3 | 0–0 | 2–1 | 0–3 | 3–1 | 3–2 | 2–2 | 0–3 |
| Dinamo Vranje | 3–1 | 1–0 | 1–0 | | 2–0 | 3–0 | 1–2 | 1–1 | 1–0 | 1–0 | 2–1 | 4–1 | 1–0 | 1–0 | 1–0 | 0–1 |
| Inđija | 3–1 | 1–0 | 1–0 | 2–1 | | 3–1 | 1–0 | 2–0 | 1–1 | 0–2 | 1–0 | 1–1 | 2–0 | 1–1 | 1–0 | 1–1 |
| Jagodina | 1–2 | 1–1 | 3–2 | 0–0 | 0–0 | | 0–2 | 0–1 | 2–2 | 0–3 | 0–0 | 0–1 | 0–2 | 0–0 | 1–0 | 0–1 |
| Metalac Gornji Milanovac | 0–0 | 1–1 | 3–0 | 0–2 | 2–0 | 1–0 | | 1–1 | 1–2 | 0–1 | 2–1 | 3–0 | 2–0 | 2–3 | 2–0 | 1–1 |
| Novi Pazar | 1–1 | 2–2 | 1–0 | 2–1 | 4–3 | 2–1 | 0–0 | | 1–1 | 0–1 | 2–1 | 1–0 | 0–0 | 1–2 | 1–1 | 2–0 |
| Proleter Novi Sad | 3–2 | 3–1 | 3–0 | 3–0 | 1–0 | 6–0 | 2–3 | 5–0 | | 2–0 | 5–1 | 1–0 | 1–0 | 2–0 | 3–0 | 2–2 |
| Radnički 1923 | 1–1 | 0–2 | 1–0 | 0–3 | 1–0 | 5–0 | 0–1 | 2–0 | 1–3 | | 0–0 | 0–1 | 0–2 | 1–0 | 4–2 | 2–2 |
| Radnički Pirot | 0–2 | 0–0 | 2–0 | 3–5 | 0–0 | 3–1 | 0–3 | 1–0 | 1–2 | 2–1 | | 2–0 | 1–0 | 1–0 | 0–0 | 2–2 |
| Sinđelić Beograd | 2–2 | 1–0 | 2–1 | 1–3 | 0–1 | 1–0 | 2–1 | 0–0 | 0–3 | 3–0 | 2–0 | | 1–1 | 0–0 | 2–1 | 0–0 |
| Sloboda Užice | 0–0 | 0–2 | 5–1 | 1–0 | 1–1 | 0–0 | 0–2 | 0–0 | 1–0 | 2–0 | 0–3 | 1–0 | | 2–1 | 2–0 | 2–3 |
| Teleoptik | 0–0 | 2–2 | 0–0 | 1–3 | 2–1 | 0–2 | 1–2 | 0–0 | 4–0 | 2–2 | 2–1 | 4–0 | 3–0 | | 0–0 | 2–0 |
| Temnić 1924 | 3–1 | 2–0 | 2–2 | 2–1 | 0–2 | 4–2 | 1–0 | 0–2 | 0–1 | 2–2 | 1–0 | 0–2 | 0–0 | 1–3 | | 0–2 |
| TSC | 4–0 | 1–0 | 0–0 | 0–0 | 1–0 | 3–0 | 0–2 | 2–0 | 1–0 | 3–0 | 0–0 | 1–2 | 3–0 | 3–0 | 7–0 | |

Source: Prva liga
Legend: Blue = home team win; Yellow = draw; Red = away team win.

== Top goalscorers ==
Including matches played on 31 May 2018; Source: Prva liga official website

| Pos | Scorer | Team | Goals |
|---|---|---|---|
| 1 | (Ghana) Zakaria Suraka | Dinamo | 17 |
| 2 | (Serbia) Milan Mirosavljev | Proleter | 16 |
| 3 | (Serbia) Slađan Nikodijević | Inđija | 13 |
| 4 | (Serbia) Slobodan Novaković | Proleter | 12 |
| 5 | (Serbia) Željko Dimitrov | Radnički Pirot | 11 |

=== Hat-tricks ===
| Player | For | Against | Result | Date |
|---|---|---|---|---|
| (Ghana) Zakaria Suraka | Dinamo | Sinđelić | 4:1 | 13 November 2017 |
