= List of Serbian football transfers summer 2016 =

- This is a list of transfers in Serbian football for the 2016–17 summer transfer window.
- Moves featuring Serbian SuperLiga and Serbian First League sides are listed.
- The order by which the clubs are listed is equal to the classifications at the end of the 2015–16 Serbian SuperLiga and 2015–16 Serbian First League.

== Serbian SuperLiga ==
=== Red Star Belgrade ===
In: Note: Flags indicate national team as defined under FIFA eligibility rules; some limited exceptions apply. Players may hold more than one non-FIFA nationality.

No.	Pos.	Nation	Player
24	MF	MKD	Daniel Avramovski (loan return from OFK Beograd)
21	DF	SRB	Stefan Milošević (from Spartak Subotica)
97	DF	GLP	Thomas Phibel (from (Russia) Mordovia)
31	GK	SRB	Marko Trkulja (loan return from Zemun)
23	MF	SRB	Andrija Luković (from (Netherlands) PSV)
98	FW	SRB	Vanja Vučićević (from Čukarički)
93	MF	SRB	Marko Poletanović (on loan from (Belgium) Gent)
7	FW	CRC	John Jairo Ruiz (from (France) Lille)
8	MF	GAB	Guélor Kanga (from (Russia) Rostov)
11	FW	ARG	Pablo Mouche (on loan from (Brazil) Palmeiras)
95	FW	SRB	Stefan Ilić (from Spartak Subotica)
22	GK	SRB	Filip Manojlović (loan return from Bačka BP, previously on loan at Bežanija)
—	MF	SRB	Veljko Nikolić (from OFK Beograd, to youth team)

Out: Note: Flags indicate national team as defined under FIFA eligibility rules; some limited exceptions apply. Players may hold more than one non-FIFA nationality.

No.	Pos.	Nation	Player
8	MF	SRB	Marko Grujić (loan return to (England) Liverpool)
7	MF	SRB	Saša Stojanović (to Radnički Niš)
—	DF	SRB	Marko Mijailović (loan extension to Bežanija)
36	MF	SRB	Lazar Tufegdžić (on loan to OFK Beograd, was on loan at Bežanija)
14	DF	MNE	Savo Pavićević (to Spartak Subotica)
—	MF	SRB	Dušan Živković (to Radnički Niš, was on loan at Bežanija)
—	DF	SRB	Filip Stanković (on loan to OFK Beograd)
5	DF	BRA	Edson Silva (released)
—	MF	BRA	Bruno Matos (to (Iran) Sanat Naft, was on loan at Novi Pazar)
23	FW	ANT	Josh Parker (released)
—	DF	SRB	Zlatko Iličić (to BSK Borča, was on loan at Sopot)
—	DF	SRB	Marko Marinković (was on loan, now signed with BSK Borča)
88	DF	ARG	Luis Ibáñez (to (Turkey) Trabzonspor)
41	GK	SRB	Jovan Vićić (on loan to Kolubara, was on loan at Loznica)
—	MF	SRB	Nemanja Ahčin (to Dinamo Pančevo, was on loan at Novi Pazar)
29	MF	SRB	Nikola Jovanović (on loan to Bežanija)
32	GK	SRB	Aleksandar Stanković (on loan to Grafičar Beograd)
—	MF	SRB	Andrija Crnadak (on loan to Grafičar Beograd)
—	FW	SRB	Marko Platiša (on loan to Grafičar Beograd)
—	MF	SRB	Vasilije Đurić (to OFK Beograd)
—	FW	MKD	Darko Grozdanoski (loan extension to BASK)
94	MF	MNE	Vladimir Jovović (on loan to Napredak Kruševac, was on loan at OFK Beograd)
—	MF	SRB	Nemanja Tomašević (on loan to Lokomotiva Beograd)
34	DF	SRB	Miloš Stojanović (loan extension to Bežanija)
—	GK	SRB	Uroš Kostić (on loan to Mladenovac)
—	MF	SRB	Milosav Sićović (on loan to Radnički Beograd)
—	MF	SRB	Viktor Živojinović (on loan to Grafičar Beograd)
44	FW	SRB	Nenad Gavrić (to Vojvodina)
10	MF	SRB	Aleksandar Katai (to (Spain) Alavés)
16	DF	NZL	Adam Mitchell (on loan to OFK Beograd, previously brought from (New Zealand) WaiBOP United)

=== Partizan ===
In: Note: Flags indicate national team as defined under FIFA eligibility rules; some limited exceptions apply. Players may hold more than one non-FIFA nationality.

No.	Pos.	Nation	Player
11	MF	SRB	Petar Đuričković (from Radnički Niš)
29	MF	SRB	Milan Radin (from Voždovac)
26	DF	SRB	Nemanja Miletić (from Javor)
17	MF	SRB	Saša Marjanović (from Radnički Niš)
19	MF	SRB	Uroš Damnjanović (loan return from Sinđelić Beograd)
95	MF	MNE	Marko Janković (on loan from (Greece) Olympiacos)
40	FW	SRB	Nikola Đurđić (from (Germany) FC Augsburg)
23	DF	SRB	Bojan Ostojić (from Čukarički)
42	MF	BRA	Leonardo (free, last with (Russia) Anzhi)
85	GK	SRB	Nemanja Stevanović (from Čukarički)
32	FW	SRB	Uroš Đurđević (from (Italy) Palermo)
—	FW	SRB	Miloš Kukolj (loan return from Bežanija)
—	FW	SRB	Vladimir Đilas (from (Bosnia and Herzegovina) Borac Banja Luka)

Out: Note: Flags indicate national team as defined under FIFA eligibility rules; some limited exceptions apply. Players may hold more than one non-FIFA nationality.

No.	Pos.	Nation	Player
3	DF	SRB	Nikola Leković (loan return to (Poland) Lechia Gdańsk)
1	GK	SRB	Živko Živković (to (Greece) Skoda Xanthi)
17	MF	SRB	Andrija Živković (to (Portugal) Benfica)
23	DF	SRB	Marko Jovanović (to (Israel) Bnei Yehuda)
30	MF	SRB	Veljko Birmančević (on loan to Teleoptik)
11	FW	CIV	Ismaël Béko Fofana (to Čukarički)
—	MF	SRB	Nemanja Glavčić (to Spartak Subotica, was on loan at Teleoptik)
—	MF	SRB	Filip Jović (loan extension to Teleoptik)
—	DF	SRB	Nemanja Petrović (to (Portugal) Chaves, was on loan at (Israel) Maccabi Netanya)
—	FW	SRB	Igor Zlatanović (to Radnik Surdulica, was on loan at Teleoptik)
—	DF	SRB	Dušan Todorović (on loan to Teleoptik)
2	DF	BUL	Ivan Bandalovski (released)
—	MF	MNE	Jovan Čađenović (on loan to Bežanija, was on loan at Teleoptik)
20	MF	SRB	Saša Lukić (to (Italy) Torino)
19	DF	BIH	Aleksandar Subić (on loan to (Bosnia and Herzegovina) Sloboda Tuzla)
—	FW	SRB	Sava Petrov (on loan to Teleoptik)
—	DF	SRB	Luka Cucin (on loan to Teleoptik)
—	MF	SRB	Filip Čermelj (on loan to Teleoptik)
45	MF	SRB	Jovan Nišić (loan extension to Teleoptik)
—	DF	SRB	Miloš Perišić (on loan to Radnički Pirot, was on loan at Teleoptik)
5	DF	SRB	Miladin Stevanović (to (Turkey) Kayserispor)
80	FW	SRB	Marko Golubović (on loan to Sinđelić Beograd)
8	MF	SRB	Darko Brašanac (to (Spain) Betis)
—	MF	SRB	Arton Zekaj (on loan to Bačka BP)
10	MF	SRB	Miroslav Radović (to (Poland) Legia Warsaw, previously brought from (Slovenia) Olimpija)
50	GK	SRB	Bojan Šaranov (to (Azerbaijan) Qarabağ)
—	DF	SRB	Nemanja Stojić (to Voždovac)

=== Čukarički ===
In: Note: Flags indicate national team as defined under FIFA eligibility rules; some limited exceptions apply. Players may hold more than one non-FIFA nationality.

No.	Pos.	Nation	Player
11	FW	SRB	Alen Mašović (from Voždovac)
5	MF	SRB	Marko Docić (from Javor)
14	MF	MNE	Asmir Kajević (from (Croatia) Rijeka)
26	DF	SRB	Đorđe Đurić (was on loan, now signed from (Montenegro) Rudar Pljevlja)
28	FW	SRB	Nemanja Radonjić (loan extension from (Italy) Roma)
9	FW	CIV	Ismaël Béko Fofana (from Partizan)
66	MF	SRB	Marko Tomić (from Radnički Niš)
89	DF	MNE	Darko Bulatović (from Radnički Niš)
71	GK	SRB	Filip Pajović (from (Hungary) Videoton)
21	FW	SRB	Aleksandar Jevtić (from Jagodina)
51	FW	SRB	Ognjen Ožegović (from (China) Changchun Yatai)
22	FW	SRB	Lazar Đurović (from (Israel) Maccabi Tel Aviv)
—	DF	BIH	Branko Bajić (from (Bosnia and Herzegovina) Radnik Bijeljina, to youth squad)

Out: Note: Flags indicate national team as defined under FIFA eligibility rules; some limited exceptions apply. Players may hold more than one non-FIFA nationality.

No.	Pos.	Nation	Player
30	FW	SRB	Nenad Mirosavljević (retired)
11	FW	SRB	Andrija Pavlović (to (Denmark) Copenhagen)
23	DF	SRB	Bojan Ostojić (to Partizan)
53	FW	SRB	Vanja Vučićević (to Red Star Belgrade)
36	GK	SRB	Nemanja Radović (on loan to Radnički Zrenjanin)
22	DF	MNE	Filip Stojković (to (Germany) 1860 Munich)
18	FW	MNE	Nikola Zvrko (to Mladost Lučani, was on loan at Sinđelić Beograd)
12	GK	SRB	Nemanja Stevanović (to Partizan)
—	GK	SRB	Teodor Obadal (on loan to Lokomotiva Beograd)
63	FW	SRB	Luka Ratković (to (Cyprus) Apollon Limassol)
61	MF	SRB	Predrag Jovanović (on loan to IMT)
—	MF	SRB	Stefan Dimić (to Zemun, was on loan at Sinđelić Beograd)
51	MF	SRB	Lazar Radović (to Dorćol)
77	MF	SRB	Filip Knežević (to Vojvodina)
23	FW	BRA	Thiago Galvão (to Borac Čačak)
—	FW	SRB	Miodrag Gemović (released, was on loan at Zemun)
35	GK	SRB	Dušan Čubraković (on loan to Sinđelić Beograd, was on loan at BASK)
—		SRB	Uroš Mladenović (on loan to Brodarac 1947)
65	MF	SRB	Stefan Šapić (on loan to Sinđelić Beograd)
—	DF	SRB	Miloš Maksimović (on loan to Brodarac 1947)

=== Vojvodina ===
In: Note: Flags indicate national team as defined under FIFA eligibility rules; some limited exceptions apply. Players may hold more than one non-FIFA nationality.

No.	Pos.	Nation	Player
5	DF	Serbia	Vladimir Kovačević (from Spartak Subotica)
18	MF	Serbia	Lazar Zličić (loan return from Proleter Novi Sad)
11	FW	Serbia	Saša Ćurko (loan return from Proleter Novi Sad)
27	DF	Bosnia and Herzegovina	Dženan Bureković (from (Bosnia and Herzegovina) Čelik Zenica)
19	FW	Serbia	Miloš Trifunović (from (Kazakhstan) Ordabasy)
15	DF	Serbia	Bogdan Planić (from OFK Beograd)
38	FW	Serbia	Marko Bačanin (from Jagodina, to youth team)
23	MF	Montenegro	Marko Vukasović (from (Georgia (country)) Chikhura Sachkhere)
80	MF	Serbia	Filip Knežević (from Čukarički)
44	FW	Serbia	Nenad Gavrić (from Red Star Belgrade)
13	DF	Serbia	Nikola Aksentijević (from (Cyprus) Apollon Limassol)
—	DF	Serbia	Igor Vukomanović (on loan from Borac Čačak, to youth team)

Out: Note: Flags indicate national team as defined under FIFA eligibility rules; some limited exceptions apply. Players may hold more than one non-FIFA nationality.

No.	Pos.	Nation	Player
13	DF	Serbia	Radovan Pankov (to (Russia) Ural Sverdlovskaya Oblast)
24	MF	Serbia	Danilo Sekulić (to (Hungary) Debrecen)
11	MF	Montenegro	Marko Vukčević (loan return to (Slovenia) Olimpija)
27	FW	Serbia	Milan Pavkov (to Radnički Niš)
19	DF	Serbia	Lazar Rosić (to (Portugal) Braga)
99	FW	Cameroon	John Mary (to (Slovenia) Rudar Velenje)
—	MF	Serbia	Strahinja Macanović (to Bačka BP)
—	DF	Serbia	Luka Miljević (to Bačka BP)
1	GK	Serbia	Srđan Žakula (to Omladinac Deronje)
15	DF	Serbia	Bojan Nastić (to (Belgium) Genk)
—	MF	Serbia	Vladan Vidaković (to Voždovac)
17	FW	Montenegro	Šaleta Kordić (to (Montenegro) Zeta, previously brought from (Montenegro) Sutjeska Nikšić)
—	MF	Serbia	Ivan Mijailović (to Zlatibor Čajetina)
17	MF	Bosnia and Herzegovina	Darko Jović (to Proleter Novi Sad)
13	FW	North Macedonia	Strahinja Krstevski (to Proleter Novi Sad)
—	MF	Serbia	Vladimir Ilić (to Proleter Novi Sad)
3	DF	Serbia	David Hrubik (on loan to Proleter Novi Sad)
23	DF	Serbia	Milan Milinković (to Radnik Surdulica)
31	MF	Serbia	Uroš Stamenić (on loan to Proleter Novi Sad)
5	DF	Montenegro	Milko Novaković (released)
—		Montenegro	Luka Štilet (to Bane Raška)
24	MF	Serbia	Marko Đurišić (loan extension to Proleter Novi Sad)
—	MF	Serbia	Dragan Karanov (was on loan, now signed with Proleter Novi Sad)
2	DF	Serbia	Milan Lazarević (on loan to Proleter Novi Sad, previously brought from the same club)
—	DF	Montenegro	Stefan Zogović (on loan to ČSK Čelarevo, was on loan at Bačka BP)
—		Serbia	Dragan Grujičić (to Veternik)
—	GK	Bosnia and Herzegovina	Stefan Stevanović (to Cement Beočin)
33	DF	Serbia	Nemanja Miletić (to (Belgium) Westerlo)
21	MF	Serbia	Nikola Kovačević (on loan to Spartak Subotica)
—	DF	Serbia	Aleksandar Lovre (released)
—	FW	Serbia	Nikola Gajić (on loan to Cement Beočin)
—	MF	Bosnia and Herzegovina	Fedor Predragović (to (Bosnia and Herzegovina) Čelik Zenica, previously brought from (Bosnia and Herzegovina) Borac Banja Luka)
—	DF	Serbia	Milan Stepanov (released)

=== Radnički Niš ===
In: Note: Flags indicate national team as defined under FIFA eligibility rules; some limited exceptions apply. Players may hold more than one non-FIFA nationality.

No.	Pos.	Nation	Player
7	MF	Serbia	Saša Stojanović (from Red Star Belgrade)
11	MF	Serbia	Lazar Arsić (from Radnik Surdulica)
33	DF	Serbia	Nikola Stanković (from Bačka BP)
9	FW	Serbia	Milan Pavkov (from Vojvodina)
8	MF	Serbia	Pavle Popara (from (United States) Orange County Blues)
17	FW	Latvia	Anastasijs Mordatenko (on loan from (Latvia) Ventspils)
20	MF	Serbia	Dušan Živković (from Red Star Belgrade)
30	GK	Serbia	Vladimir Bajić (from Borac Čačak)
44	DF	Serbia	Dušan Ivanov (from Sinđelić Beograd)
26	DF	Montenegro	Nemanja Kartal (from (Greece) PAOK)
55	DF	Serbia	Miloš Radivojević (from Voždovac)
23	MF	Serbia	Miloš Stanojević (from Mladost Lučani)
15	DF	Serbia	Aleksandar Ignjatović (from (Hungary) Honvéd)
99	FW	Russia	Ramazan Isayev (from (Belarus) Dinamo Brest)

Out: Note: Flags indicate national team as defined under FIFA eligibility rules; some limited exceptions apply. Players may hold more than one non-FIFA nationality.

No.	Pos.	Nation	Player
26	GK	Serbia	Aleksandar S. Jovanović (to (Denmark) AGF)
7	MF	Serbia	Petar Đuričković (to Partizan)
21	MF	Serbia	Saša Marjanović (to Partizan)
40	FW	Serbia	Miodrag Todorović (to (Latvia) Babīte)
44	DF	Serbia	Nemanja Lakić-Pešić (to (Austria) Kapfenberger SV)
6	MF	Serbia	Marko Tomić (to Čukarički)
28	DF	Serbia	Vladimir Đorđević (released)
32	MF	Serbia	Vladimir Bogdanović (to Borac Čačak)
89	DF	Montenegro	Darko Bulatović (to Čukarički)
22	DF	Serbia	Lazar Anđelković (on loan to Dunav Prahovo)
91	DF	Serbia	Aleksandar Mršević (to Zlatibor Čajetina)
—	MF	Serbia	Filip Alija (on loan to Sinđelić Niš)
—	MF	Serbia	Ilija Stojančić (on loan to Real Niš)
—	MF	Serbia	Ivan Krstić (on loan to Real Niš)
—	FW	Serbia	Marko Branković (loan extension to Car Konstantin)
—	DF	Serbia	Dragomir Nikolić (on loan to Car Konstantin, was on loan at Timočanin)
—	DF	Serbia	Petar Bogdanović (on loan to Car Konstantin, previously brought from predak Kruševac)
13	DF	Serbia	Mladen Mitrović (loan extension to Car Konstantin)
—	MF	Serbia	Stefan Zdravković (loan extension to Car Konstantin)
12	GK	Serbia	Miloš Perić (on loan to Car Konstantin, previously brought from Radnički Pirot)
—	FW	Serbia	Lazar Kostić (on loan to Car Konstantin)
50	FW	Serbia	Nikola Petković (on loan to Car Konstantin)
—	DF	Serbia	Rastko Stojanović (on loan to Sinđelić Niš)
67	MF	Serbia	Nikola Mitrović (on loan to Sinđelić Niš, was on loan at Car Konstantin)
—	FW	Serbia	Miroslav Marković (to Radan Lebane)
—		Serbia	Marko Jovanović (on loan to Car Konstantin)
—	FW	Serbia	Ilija Šuković (on loan to Sinđelić Niš)
—	DF	Serbia	Srđan Marinković (on loan to Sinđelić Niš)
—	DF	Serbia	Uroš Mitrović (to BASK, was on loan at Sinđelić Niš)
69	MF	Serbia	Marko Listeš (on loan to Car Konstantin, previously brought from the same club)
—	DF	Serbia	Mitar Mladenović (loan extension to Sinđelić Niš)
—	DF	Serbia	Ivan Mladenović (on loan to Jedinstvo Putevi, was on loan Sinđelić Niš)

=== Borac Čačak ===
In: Note: Flags indicate national team as defined under FIFA eligibility rules; some limited exceptions apply. Players may hold more than one non-FIFA nationality.

No.	Pos.	Nation	Player
22	DF	Serbia	Dušan Đorđević (loan return from Polet Ljubić)
31	MF	Serbia	Marko Zoćević (from Mladost Lučani)
3	DF	Serbia	Nenad Kočović (from Proleter Novi Sad)
7	FW	Serbia	Lazar Sajčić (from Jagodina)
23	FW	Ghana	Kennedy Asamoah (from (Ghana) Medeama)
14	MF	Serbia	Zoran Kostić (from (Hungary) Nyíregyháza)
1	GK	Serbia	Branimir Aleksić (from (Greece) AEL Kalloni)
9	FW	Serbia	Dragoljub Anđelković (from Sloga PM)
32	MF	Serbia	Vladimir Bogdanović (from Radnički Niš)
30	FW	Serbia	Stefan Mihajlović (from (Switzerland) Chiasso)
8	DF	Guinea-Bissau	Bacar Baldé (from (South Africa) Vasco da Gama)
94	FW	Germany	Nikola Ilić (from (Germany) TSV Großhadern)
15	MF	DR Congo	Poba Toure (from (Republic of the Congo) Patronage Sainte-Anne)
21	MF	Montenegro	Uroš Delić (from Metalac G. M.)
20	FW	Brazil	Thiago Galvão (from Čukarički)

Out: Note: Flags indicate national team as defined under FIFA eligibility rules; some limited exceptions apply. Players may hold more than one non-FIFA nationality.

No.	Pos.	Nation	Player
77	MF	Serbia	Đuro Zec (to Voždovac)
30	GK	Serbia	Vladimir Bajić (to Radnički Niš)
9	MF	Montenegro	Darko Zorić (loan return to (Greece) AEK Athens)
3	MF	Sierra Leone	Mustapha Bangura (to Zemun)
7	MF	Brazil	Pedro Sass (released)
11	MF	Bulgaria	Iliyan Yordanov (to (Bulgaria) Vereya)
25	DF	Serbia	Stefan Đorđević (to (Italy) Calcio Catania)
94	MF	Montenegro	Aldin Adžović (to (Montenegro) Zeta)
13	MF	Montenegro	Boris Bulajić (to (Montenegro) Iskra Danilovgrad)
23	FW	Serbia	Vuk Sotirović (to Zemun)
12	GK	Serbia	Marko Drobnjak (on loan to Radnički Kragujevac, was on loan at Polet Ljubić)
8	MF	Serbia	Stefan Milojević (to Bežanija)
—	FW	Serbia	Dušan Vujadinović (to BSK Borča)
—	MF	Serbia	Nemanja Kruševac (to Metalac G. M.)
—	DF	Serbia	Milan Matović (on loan to Polet Ljubić)
—		Serbia	Marko Milijanović (to Polet Ljubić)
—	DF	Serbia	Labud Bogićević (to Sloboda Čačak, was on loan at Polet Ljubić)
—	MF	Serbia	Nikola Milekić (to Miokovci)
16	FW	Serbia	Nikola Pantović (to Mladost Lučani, was on loan at Polet Ljubić)
—	DF	Serbia	Stefan Kurandić (to Mokra Gora, was on loan at Sloga Kraljevo)
—	DF	Serbia	Dragan Đorđević (to Metalac G. M.)
29	DF	Serbia	Igor Vukomanović (on loan to Vojvodina, was on loan at Polet Ljubić)
18	MF	Serbia	Nemanja Stanković (on loan to Polet Ljubić, previously brought from (Slovakia) Žilina)
—		Serbia	Dušan Kričkić (to Miokovci)
26	MF	Serbia	Stefan Vukmirović (to Sloboda Užice)
88	MF	Serbia	Milorad Balabanović (to Bačka BP)
21	MF	Serbia	Branislav Tomić (to Metalac G. M., was on loan at Polet Ljubić)
5	DF	Serbia	Milan Gašić (on loan to Kolubara, previously brought from Napredak Kruševac)
—	MF	Serbia	Dejan Radosavljević (to Radnički Kovači, was on loan at Sloga Kraljevo)
—	DF	Serbia	Nebojša Ćirković (to Polimlje)
—	FW	Serbia	Lazar Jolović (on loan to Polet Ljubić, previously brought from BASK)

=== Voždovac ===
In: Note: Flags indicate national team as defined under FIFA eligibility rules; some limited exceptions apply. Players may hold more than one non-FIFA nationality.

No.	Pos.	Nation	Player
7	FW	Serbia	Dejan Georgijević (from Inđija)
5	DF	Serbia	Marko Gajić (from Javor Ivanjica)
3	DF	Bosnia and Herzegovina	Slaviša Radović (from (Bosnia and Herzegovina) Olimpic)
23	MF	Serbia	Aleksandar Ješić (from OFK Beograd)
9	FW	Serbia	Stefan Dražić (from Javor Ivanjica)
10	MF	Serbia	Đuro Zec (from Borac Čačak)
18	FW	Serbia	Filip Stuparević (from Rad)
17	DF	Serbia	Marko Putinčanin (from Radnik Surdulica)
16	DF	Montenegro	Dejan Boljević (from (Uzbekistan) Nasaf)
20	MF	Serbia	Branislav Jovanović (from (Israel) Hapoel Acre)
15	MF	Serbia	Vladan Vidaković (from Vojvodina)
44	MF	Serbia	Nikola Lukić (from (Slovakia) Zemplín Michalovce)
2	DF	Serbia	Aleksandar Filipović (from Jagodina)
—		Serbia	Aleksandar Tomić (from Spartak Subotica, to youth team)
13	DF	Serbia	Nemanja Stojić (from Partizan)

Out: Note: Flags indicate national team as defined under FIFA eligibility rules; some limited exceptions apply. Players may hold more than one non-FIFA nationality.

No.	Pos.	Nation	Player
23	MF	Bosnia and Herzegovina	Vladan Grujić (retired)
20	FW	Serbia	Jovan Damjanović (retired)
5	DF	Serbia	Miloš Radivojević (to Radnički Niš)
50	DF	Bosnia and Herzegovina	Borislav Terzić (to Javor Ivanjica)
21	DF	Serbia	Deni Pavlović (to (Montenegro) Zeta)
44	FW	Serbia	Alen Mašović (to Čukarički)
29	MF	Serbia	Milan Radin (to Partizan)
10	MF	Serbia	Marko Adamović (to (Cyprus) Karmiotissa)
12	GK	Montenegro	Nemanja Jevrić (to (Montenegro) Radnički Berane)
18	FW	Nigeria	Obiora Odita (to Mladost Lučani)
17	MF	Serbia	Ognjen Krasić (to (Uzbekistan) Nasaf)
13	DF	Serbia	Vladimir Jašić (to Zlatibor Čajetina)
15	MF	Serbia	Nenad Marinković (to (Turkey) Gaziantep BB)
—	GK	Serbia	Nedeljko Stojišić (to Crvena Zvezda MML, was on loan at Zvezdara)
—	MF	Serbia	Stefan S. Tripković (to BSK Borča)
27	DF	Germany	Stefan Kukoljac (on loan to Sinđelić Beograd, was on loan at Crvena Zvezda MML)
—		Serbia	Dragan Antić (to Temnić)
16	MF	Serbia	Mihailo Oreščanin (on loan to Radnički Obrenovac)
29	DF	Serbia	Miloš Vranjanin (on loan to Radnički Obrenovac, previously brought from the same club)
—	FW	Serbia	Marko Radivojević (to Trstenik PPT)
41	DF	Serbia	Saša Ivković (on loan to (Israel) Ashdod)
—	GK	Serbia	Miloš Ostojić (on loan to Hajduk Beograd, previously brought from (Croatia) Istra 1961)
—	FW	Serbia	Nenad Radonjić (released, was on loan at Radnički Beograd)

=== Radnik Surdulica ===
In: Note: Flags indicate national team as defined under FIFA eligibility rules; some limited exceptions apply. Players may hold more than one non-FIFA nationality.

No.	Pos.	Nation	Player
22	GK	Serbia	Ognjen Čančarević (from Mladost Lučani)
8	MF	Serbia	Miloš Adamović (from (Hungary) Vasas)
11	FW	Serbia	Nikola Radović (from BSK Borča)
14	FW	Serbia	Uroš Nenadović (from Rad)
27	FW	Serbia	Igor Zlatanović (from Partizan)
5	DF	Serbia	Danijel Stojković (from OFK Beograd)
2	DF	Serbia	Siniša Mladenović (from (Montenegro) Bokelj)
20	MF	Bosnia and Herzegovina	Igor Mišan (from (Bosnia and Herzegovina) Zvijezda Gradačac)
10	FW	Ghana	Francis Kyeremeh (from Jagodina)
18	MF	Austria	Dejan Nešović (from (Austria) Schwechat)
4	MF	Montenegro	Nedeljko Vlahović (from (Montenegro) Rudar Pljevlja)
24	DF	Serbia	Milan Milinković (from Vojvodina)
6	MF	Serbia	Nikola Krčmarević (from (Greece) Panegialios)
23	FW	Montenegro	Luka Merdović (from Metalac G. M.)
9	FW	Montenegro	Stefan Nikolić (from (Poland) Termalica Nieciecza)
19	MF	Serbia	Ivan Đorić (on loan from (Switzerland) Sion)
—		Serbia	Miljan Petković (loan return from Jedinstvo Bošnjace, to youth team)

Out: Note: Flags indicate national team as defined under FIFA eligibility rules; some limited exceptions apply. Players may hold more than one non-FIFA nationality.

No.	Pos.	Nation	Player
6	DF	Serbia	Miloš Simonović (loan return to Napredak Kruševac)
11	FW	Serbia	Slaviša Stojanović (to (Israel) Hapoel Kfar Saba)
77	MF	Serbia	Miloš Deletić (to (Greece) AEL)
12	GK	Serbia	Borivoje Ristić (to (Slovenia) Rudar Velenje)
1	GK	Serbia	Miroslav Grujičić (to Dinamo Vranje)
19	MF	Ghana	Samuel Owusu (to (Turkey) Gençlerbirliği)
10	MF	Serbia	Lazar Arsić (to Radnički Niš)
8	MF	Serbia	Filip Stojanović (to (Greece) Trikala)
22	MF	Serbia	Miljan Mutavdžić (to Novi Pazar)
20	DF	North Macedonia	Nikola Stojanović (to Dinamo Vranje)
86	DF	Serbia	Miloš Marković (to Rad)
23	DF	Serbia	Marko Putinčanin (to Voždovac)
13	GK	Serbia	Bojan Šejić (to Kosanica)
18	DF	Serbia	Stefan Radovanović (to Zemun)
14	FW	Ghana	Zakaria Suraka (to Dinamo Vranje)
—	DF	Serbia	Miljan Stojanović (to Dinamo Vranje)
—	MF	Serbia	Bojan Čukić (to Vršac United)
9	MF	Serbia	Marko Vučetić (to Bežanija)
9	MF	Serbia	Nenad Lukić (on loan to Zemun, previously brought from Bežanija)
4	DF	Serbia	Zlatko Liščević (released, previously brought from OFK Beograd)
25	DF	Serbia	Petar Planić (to (Lebanon) Nejmeh SC, previously brought from Sloga PM)
—	DF	Serbia	Miroslav Jovčić (on loan to Morava Vladičin Han)
12	GK	Serbia	Lazar Tatić (released, previously brought from Jagodina)

=== Mladost Lučani ===
In: Note: Flags indicate national team as defined under FIFA eligibility rules; some limited exceptions apply. Players may hold more than one non-FIFA nationality.

No.	Pos.	Nation	Player
—	MF	Serbia	Stefan Ristović (loan return from Sloga Požega)
58	FW	Cameroon	Michel Vaillant (was on loan, now signed from Napredak Kruševac)
4	DF	Serbia	Ivan Milošević (free, last with (Uzbekistan) Bunyodkor)
15	MF	Serbia	Aleksandar Pejović (from OFK Beograd)
28	DF	Serbia	Nikola Andrić (from (Slovakia) Podbrezová)
27	MF	Serbia	Vladimir Radivojević (from Novi Pazar)
18	FW	Nigeria	Obiora Odita (from Voždovac)
31	MF	Montenegro	Janko Tumbasević (from Spartak Subotica)
33	DF	Serbia	Radoš Protić (from Rad)
9	FW	Montenegro	Nikola Zvrko (from Čukarički)
23	GK	Serbia	Dragan Rosić (from Jedinstvo Putevi)
88	FW	Serbia	Milan Bojović (from (Greece) AEL)
6	FW	Serbia	Nikola Pantović (from Borac Čačak)
14	FW	Serbia	Marko Simić (from OFK Beograd)
21	MF	Serbia	Nikola Tasić (from (Malta) Naxxar Lions)
—	GK	Serbia	Danko Savanović (from (Switzerland) Rothrist)

Out: Note: Flags indicate national team as defined under FIFA eligibility rules; some limited exceptions apply. Players may hold more than one non-FIFA nationality.

No.	Pos.	Nation	Player
18	DF	North Macedonia	Aleksandar Lazevski (to (Bosnia and Herzegovina) Sloboda Tuzla)
22	GK	Serbia	Ognjen Čančarević (to Radnik Surdulica)
27	FW	Bosnia and Herzegovina	Miloš Bajić (to BSK Borča)
28	MF	Serbia	Miloš Lepović (to Novi Pazar)
33	FW	Serbia	Aleksandar Đoković (to Novi Pazar)
14	MF	Serbia	Marko Zoćević (to Borac Čačak)
55	MF	Bosnia and Herzegovina	Uroš Đerić (to Sloboda Užice)
77	MF	Serbia	Stevan Luković (to Zemun)
16	FW	Serbia	Bojan Čečarić (on loan to Novi Pazar)
22	GK	Bosnia and Herzegovina	Branislav Ružić (to (Bosnia and Herzegovina) Čelik Zenica, previously brought from (Bosnia and Herzegovina) Borac Banja Luka)
21	FW	Serbia	Predrag Živadinović (to Šumadija 1903)
23	GK	Serbia	Nemanja Radukić (to Loznica)
6	MF	Serbia	Miloš Stanojević (to Radnički Niš)
31		Serbia	Predrag Bogdanović (to Smederevo)
19	DF	Serbia	Aleksandar Živanović (released)
20	MF	Serbia	Matija Protić (on loan to Sloga Požega)

=== Spartak Subotica ===
In: Note: Flags indicate national team as defined under FIFA eligibility rules; some limited exceptions apply. Players may hold more than one non-FIFA nationality.

No.	Pos.	Nation	Player
—	DF	Serbia	Nikola Banjac (loan return from Bačka 1901)
40	DF	Serbia	Nemanja Ćalasan (loan return from Bačka 1901)
2	DF	Ukraine	Vadym Zhuk (from (Ukraine) Hirnyk Kryvyi Rih)
15	MF	Serbia	Nemanja Glavčić (from Partizan)
6	DF	Montenegro	Savo Pavićević (from Red Star Belgrade)
66	DF	Serbia	Aleksandar Radovanović (from OFK Beograd)
24	MF	China	Zhong Haoran (from (China) Hunan Billows)
27	MF	Nigeria	Nnaemeka Ajuru (from Javor Ivanjica)
3	DF	Serbia	Marko Anđić (from (Cyprus) Nea Salamina)
11	DF	Serbia	Marko Bašanović (from Rad)
23	MF	Serbia	Mile Savković (from Jagodina)
18	DF	Montenegro	Lazar Đokić (from Radnički Beograd)
—	FW	Serbia	Predrag Medić (on loan from TSC, to youth team)
—		Serbia	Marko Jerković (on loan from TSC, to youth team)
19	MF	Serbia	Nikola Kovačević (on loan from Vojvodina)
33	GK	Serbia	Aleksandar Kesić (free, last with Radnički Niš)
30	DF	Serbia	Aranđel Stojković (from OFK Beograd)
—		Nigeria	Michael Orji Ndukwo (free)

Out: Note: Flags indicate national team as defined under FIFA eligibility rules; some limited exceptions apply. Players may hold more than one non-FIFA nationality.

No.	Pos.	Nation	Player
6	DF	Serbia	Vladimir Kovačević (to Vojvodina)
11	DF	Serbia	Stefan Milošević (to Red Star Belgrade)
17	DF	Serbia	Goran Antonić (to (Cyprus) Nea Salamina)
24	MF	Montenegro	Janko Tumbasević (to Mladost Lučani)
18	MF	Serbia	Nenad Šljivić (to Napredak Kruševac)
30	DF	Serbia	Vladimir Branković (to Zemun)
15	MF	Serbia	Slobodan Novaković (to (Switzerland) BSC Old Boys)
40	DF	Serbia	Vukašin Tomić (to Jagodina)
7	MF	Kazakhstan	Maxim Fedin (to (Kazakhstan) Atyrau)
19	FW	Serbia	Stefan Ilić (to Red Star Belgrade)
—	MF	Serbia	Luka Sili (to Bačka 1901)
5	MF	Serbia	Milan Jokić (to BSK Borča)
—	MF	Serbia	Stefan Spremo (was on loan, now signed with Bačka 1901)
—	MF	Serbia	Aleksa Matić (to Sloga Čonoplja, was on loan at Bačka 1901)
—	MF	Serbia	Marko Pantić (on loan to Hajduk Čurug)
—	MF	Serbia	Aleksandar Milikić (to TSC, was on loan at Bačka 1901)
—	MF	Serbia	Stefan Torbica (to Sloga Čonoplja, was on loan at Bačka 1901)
—		Serbia	Aleksandar Tomić (to Voždovac)
—	MF	Montenegro	Savo Gazivoda (on loan to (Spain) Extremadura UD, previously brought from ČSK Čelarevo)
—	DF	Serbia	Dušan Štrbac (released, was on loan at Senta)
29	FW	Serbia	Miloš Manojlović (to Proleter Novi Sad, was on loan at Senta)
—	MF	Serbia	Marko Stošić (on loan to Bratstvo Prigrevica, was on loan at Senta)
20	DF	Serbia	Dimitrije Tomović (on loan to ČSK Čelarevo, was on loan at Senta)
13	MF	Serbia	Danijel Zlatković (on loan to ČSK Čelarevo, was on loan at Bačka 1901)
25	GK	Serbia	Dino Žužo (on loan to Potisje Kanjiža)
—	MF	Serbia	Stefan Paunović (to Potisje Kanjiža)
—	FW	Serbia	Zvonko Jakovljević (loan extension to Bačka 1901)
—		Serbia	Stefan Simić (on loan to Bačka 1901)
28	FW	Serbia	Milan Đokić (on loan to ČSK Čelarevo, was on loan at TSC)
5	DF	Serbia	Dejan Kerkez (on loan to ČSK Čelarevo, previously brought from the same club)
—		Serbia	Mario Caušević (on loan to Tavankut)
—	MF	Serbia	Stefan Ćulafić (to Vinogradar Hajdukovo)
14	DF	Serbia	Nebojša Mezei (to ČSK Čelarevo)
—	FW	Serbia	Aleksandar Crnojački (on loan to ČSK Čelarevo)
—	DF	Serbia	Dejan Parezanović (on loan to Bačka 1901, previously brought from Bežanija)
22	MF	Serbia	Milan Makarić (released)

=== Metalac G. M. ===
In: Note: Flags indicate national team as defined under FIFA eligibility rules; some limited exceptions apply. Players may hold more than one non-FIFA nationality.

No.	Pos.	Nation	Player
20	FW	Serbia	Nikola Čumić (from Sloboda Užice)
22	DF	Serbia	Petar Pavlović (from Novi Pazar)
7	MF	Serbia	Ersan Rovčanin (from (Bosnia and Herzegovina) Metalleghe-BSI)
5	DF	Serbia	Dejan Uzelac (from (Bosnia and Herzegovina) Olimpik Sarajevo)
14	DF	Ukraine	Taras Bondarenko (from (Ukraine) Avanhard Kramatorsk)
—	MF	Serbia	Nemanja Kruševac (from Borac Čačak, to youth team)
—	DF	Serbia	Dragan Đorđević (from Borac Čačak, to youth team)
—	GK	Serbia	Ivan Ristović (on loan from Radnički 1923, to youth team)
—		Serbia	Nemanja Bojović (from TSC, to youth team)
—	MF	Serbia	Njegoš Drecun (from Sloga Kraljevo, to youth team)
16	MF	Serbia	Branislav Tomić (from Borac Čačak)
10	FW	Serbia	Ivica Jovanović (from Rad)
1	GK	Bosnia and Herzegovina	Čedomir Radić (from (Bosnia and Herzegovina) Goražde)

Out: Note: Flags indicate national team as defined under FIFA eligibility rules; some limited exceptions apply. Players may hold more than one non-FIFA nationality.

No.	Pos.	Nation	Player
20	MF	Serbia	Goran Luković (retired)
7	FW	Montenegro	Luka Merdović (to Radnik Surdulica)
9	FW	Serbia	Dragan Milovanović (to Jagodina)
—	DF	Serbia	Nikola Todorić (to BSK Borča, was on loan at Sloga Kraljevo)
5	DF	Serbia	Aleksandar Simov (to Dinamo Vranje)
14	MF	Serbia	Nikola Dimitrijević (to Novi Pazar)
22	MF	Serbia	Aleksandar Sedlar (to (Poland) Piast Gliwice)
23	DF	Serbia	Miloš Rnić (to (Albania) Flamurtari)
—	MF	Serbia	Milan Sekulić (released, was on loan at Karađorđe Topola)
32	DF	Serbia	Bojan Mijailović (on loan to Kolubara)
16	FW	Serbia	Nikola Vuković (to Lunjevica, was on loan at Karađorđe Topola)
5	DF	Serbia	Vladimir Bubanja (to Zemun, previously brought from Kolubara)
—	MF	Serbia	Darko Pavlović (to Polet Ljubić, was on loan at Jedinstvo Putevi)
—	MF	Serbia	Aleksandar Martinović (on loan to Polet Ljubić, previously brought from OFK Beograd)
12	GK	Serbia	Stevan Bojović (on loan to Takovo)
21	MF	Montenegro	Uroš Delić (to Borac Čačak)
1	GK	Montenegro	Bojan Zogović (to Novi Pazar)
10	MF	Serbia	Igor Stanojević (to Zemun)
—	MF	North Macedonia	Stefan Andrić (to Šumadija 1903, previously brought from Radnički 1923)

=== Rad ===
In: Note: Flags indicate national team as defined under FIFA eligibility rules; some limited exceptions apply. Players may hold more than one non-FIFA nationality.

No.	Pos.	Nation	Player
24	DF	Montenegro	Stefan Vico (loan return from Inđija)
16	MF	Montenegro	Nikola Drinčić (out of retirement)
9	FW	Serbia	Miljan Mrdaković (free, last with (Greece) Agrotikos Asteras)
70	FW	Serbia	Duško Petković (from Žarkovo)
23	DF	Serbia	Nikola Šipčić (from Žarkovo)
19	FW	Serbia	Dejan Đenić (from (Montenegro) Bokelj)
86	DF	Serbia	Miloš Marković (from Radnik Surdulica)
22	MF	Montenegro	Stefan Lončar (from (Montenegro) Sutjeska Nikšić)

Out: Note: Flags indicate national team as defined under FIFA eligibility rules; some limited exceptions apply. Players may hold more than one non-FIFA nationality.

No.	Pos.	Nation	Player
9	FW	Serbia	Andrija Kaluđerović (to (Lithuania) Žalgiris)
70	FW	Serbia	Uroš Nenadović (to Radnik Surdulica)
—	FW	Serbia	Filip Stuparević (to Voždovac)
3	DF	Serbia	Radoš Protić (to Mladost Lučani)
22	MF	Serbia	Matija Ljujić (to (Lithuania) Žalgiris)
—	DF	Serbia	Marko Bašanović (to Spartak Subotica)
4	DF	Serbia	Nikola Đurić (to (Albania) Flamurtari)
19	MF	Serbia	Nemanja Arsenijević (to (Greece) Sparta)
—	FW	Serbia	Nemanja Gavrilović (to Dorćol, was on loan at Žarkovo)
—	DF	Serbia	Vladimir Stupić (to Crvena Zvezda MML)
34	DF	Serbia	Filip Bainović (loan extension to Žarkovo)
2	DF	Serbia	Strahinja Tanasijević (on loan to Žarkovo)
12	GK	Serbia	Dušan Marković (loan extension to Žarkovo)
3	DF	Serbia	Luka Petrović (loan extension to Žarkovo)
—	DF	Serbia	Miloš Maksović (to Radnički Kovači)
—	GK	Montenegro	Sava Mugoša (on loan to Vršac, previously brought from Proleter Vranovo)
23	MF	Serbia	Dušan Kolarević (to Varvarin)
—		Serbia	Ognjen Bodlović (on loan to Dinamo Pančevo)
22	FW	Serbia	Ivica Jovanović (to Metalac G. M.)
—	MF	Bosnia and Herzegovina	Savo Đokić (to Zemun)

=== Javor Ivanjica ===
In: Note: Flags indicate national team as defined under FIFA eligibility rules; some limited exceptions apply. Players may hold more than one non-FIFA nationality.

No.	Pos.	Nation	Player
—	MF	Nigeria	Samson Obagbemiro (loan return from (Montenegro) Iskra Danilovgrad)
21	DF	Bosnia and Herzegovina	Borislav Terzić (from Voždovac)
5	MF	Serbia	Saša Tomanović (from (Montenegro) Mladost Podgorica)
8	MF	Serbia	Jordan Jovanović (from BSK Borča)
30	FW	Serbia	Darko Bjedov (from (Montenegro) Zeta)
9	FW	Greece	Andreas Vlachomitros (on loan from (Greece) AEK Athens)
3	DF	Serbia	Miloš Karišik (from (Czech Republic) Slovan Liberec)
15	FW	Bosnia and Herzegovina	Ismar Tandir (free, last with (Iceland) Breiðablik)
26	MF	Serbia	Miloš Milisavljević (from (Bosnia and Herzegovina) Mladost Doboj Kakanj)
2	DF	North Macedonia	Filip Ristovski (free, last with (Bosnia and Herzegovina) Borac Banja Luka)
12	GK	Serbia	Toma Koković (from OFK Beograd)
25	MF	Serbia	Milan Spremo (from (Slovenia) Celje)
16	MF	Serbia	Nikola Karaklajić (from (Czech Republic) Příbram)
13	FW	Angola	Alexandre Cristóvão (from (Angola) Porcelana)
32	MF	Serbia	Ivan Cvetković (from Jagodina)

Out: Note: Flags indicate national team as defined under FIFA eligibility rules; some limited exceptions apply. Players may hold more than one non-FIFA nationality.

No.	Pos.	Nation	Player
17	DF	Serbia	Nemanja Miletić (to Partizan)
5	MF	Serbia	Marko Docić (to Čukarički)
26	DF	Serbia	Marko Gajić (to Voždovac)
—	MF	Serbia	Dejan Savkov (to Železničar Pančevo, was on loan at Sloga Požega)
12	GK	Serbia	Miloš Ivanović (to Vlasina)
9	FW	Serbia	Stefan Dražić (to Voždovac)
33	FW	Serbia	Marko Zečević (on loan to Bačka BP)
21	DF	Serbia	Zoran Švonja (to Bačka BP)
6	MF	Nigeria	Nnaemeka Ajuru (to Spartak Subotica)
15	DF	Serbia	Đorđe Crnomarković (to (Slovenia) Olimpija)
—	MF	Bosnia and Herzegovina	Aleksandar Ilić (to (Greece) Trikala, was on loan at (Bosnia and Herzegovina) Drina Zvornik)
8	MF	Russia	Maksim Martusevich (to (Russia) Zenit Penza)
25	DF	Serbia	Nikola Bjelanović (on loan to IMT)
17	DF	Serbia	Nenad Sević (on loan to Kolubara, previously brought from Budućnost Krušik)
6	DF	North Macedonia	Nikola Stojanov (on loan to Sloboda Užice, previously brought from Lokomotiva Beograd)
13	MF	Serbia	Nemanja Živković (on loan to Sloboda Užice, was on loan at Loznica)
32	MF	Serbia	Filip Lakićević (on loan to Zlatibor Čajetina, was on loan at Sloga Požega)
—		Serbia	Marko Mazić (to Kolubara)
22	FW	Serbia	Aleksandar Dimitrić (on loan to Kolubara)
31	FW	Serbia	Andrija Ratković (on loan to Radnički Obrenovac)

=== Novi Pazar ===
In: Note: Flags indicate national team as defined under FIFA eligibility rules; some limited exceptions apply. Players may hold more than one non-FIFA nationality.

No.	Pos.	Nation	Player
5	MF	Serbia	Miljan Mutavdžić (from Radnik Surdulica)
10	MF	Bosnia and Herzegovina	Anid Travančić (from (Bosnia and Herzegovina) Proleter Teslić)
30	MF	Serbia	Miloš Lepović (from Mladost Lučani)
11	FW	Serbia	Aleksandar Đoković (from Mladost Lučani)
32	MF	Serbia	Nikola Dimitrijević (from Metalac GM)
7	MF	Serbia	Enver Alivodić (from (Australia) Newcastle Jets)
17	FW	Bosnia and Herzegovina	Petar Kunić (from (Bosnia and Herzegovina) Rudar Prijedor)
77	DF	Serbia	Slavko Marić (from Jagodina)
4	DF	Serbia	Darko Stanojević (from (Uzbekistan) Olmaliq)
16	FW	Serbia	Bojan Čečarić (on loan from Mladost Lučani)
84	MF	Austria	Kenan Muslimović (from (Bosnia and Herzegovina) Mladost Doboj Kakanj)
19	DF	Serbia	Ervin Kačar (from Jošanica)
55	GK	Montenegro	Bojan Zogović (from Metalac G. M.)
80	MF	Serbia	Milan Svojić (from (Cyprus) Enosis)
44	MF	Uzbekistan	Murod Rajabov (from (Uzbekistan) Olmaliq)

Out: Note: Flags indicate national team as defined under FIFA eligibility rules; some limited exceptions apply. Players may hold more than one non-FIFA nationality.

No.	Pos.	Nation	Player
11	MF	Brazil	Bruno Matos (loan return to Red Star Belgrade)
6	MF	Serbia	Nemanja Ahčin (loan return to Red Star Belgrade)
5	DF	Serbia	Milan Savić (to (Cyprus) Anorthosis)
24	DF	Serbia	Petar Pavlović (to Metalac G. M.)
27	MF	Serbia	Vladimir Radivojević (to Mladost Lučani)
44	MF	Serbia	Nemanja Vidić (to (Kazakhstan) Kyzylzhar)
4	DF	Serbia	Jasmin Trtovac (to (Romania) Gaz Metan)
55	MF	Bosnia and Herzegovina	Amer Osmanagić (to Zemun)
80	MF	Serbia	Edin Selimović (to (Turkey) Modafen)
14	FW	Serbia	Vojo Ubiparip (to (Poland) Górnik Łęczna)
20	DF	Ghana	Owusu-Ansah Kontor (to (Greece) AEL)
—	FW	Serbia	Mirko Sekulić (to Jagodina)
—	FW	Serbia	Enes Dolovac (to (Greece) PAS Giannina)
—	GK	Serbia	Jasmin Koč (on loan to Jošanica, was on loan at Polimlje)
—	MF	Serbia	Faruk Bihorac (on loan to Jošanica, was on loan at Železničar Lajkovac)
28	MF	Serbia	Ensar Bajramlić (on loan to Jošanica)
97	GK	Serbia	Pavle Nićiforović (on loan to Jošanica)
77	DF	Serbia	Nemanja Zlatković (to Zemun)
—		Serbia	Mirza Delimeđac (to Jošanica)
—		Serbia	Ernad Brunčević (to Jošanica)
—		Serbia	Mihajlo Vučinić (to Jošanica)
—	GK	Serbia	Danilo Đulčić (to Jošanica)
22	DF	Serbia	Mehmed Avdić (on loan to Jošanica)
22	MF	Serbia	Dino Šarac (to Napredak Kruševac)
10	MF	Serbia	Almedin Zilkić (to (Croatia) HNK Gorica)
—	FW	Serbia	Semin Hadžibulić (to Jošanica)
—		Serbia	Armin Ukić (to Jošanica)
28	DF	Serbia	Marko Paunović (to Jagodina)

=== Napredak Kruševac ===
In: Note: Flags indicate national team as defined under FIFA eligibility rules; some limited exceptions apply. Players may hold more than one non-FIFA nationality.

No.	Pos.	Nation	Player
27	DF	Serbia	Slobodan Urošević (loan return from (Belgium) OH Leuven)
5	DF	Serbia	Miloš Simonović (loan return from Radnik Surdulica)
17	MF	Serbia	Aleksa Vukanović (from ČSK Čelarevo)
14	FW	Serbia	Georgije Ilić (from ČSK Čelarevo)
8	MF	Serbia	Nenad Šljivić (from Spartak Subotica)
3	MF	Serbia	Boris Varga (from ČSK Čelarevo)
18	DF	Serbia	Nikola Leković (from (Poland) Lechia Gdańsk)
31	MF	Serbia	Saša Filipović (from Dorćol)
11	MF	Serbia	Branimir Petrović (from (Russia) Volgar Astrakhan)
21	DF	Serbia	Dragan Žarković (from (Cyprus) Nea Salamina)
22	MF	Montenegro	Vladimir Jovović (on loan from Red Star Belgrade)
13	FW	Serbia	Bratislav Punoševac (from (Hungary) Békéscsaba)
—		Serbia	Miloš Branković (from OFK Beograd, to youth squad)
28	MF	Serbia	Dino Šarac (from Novi Pazar)

Out: Note: Flags indicate national team as defined under FIFA eligibility rules; some limited exceptions apply. Players may hold more than one non-FIFA nationality.

No.	Pos.	Nation	Player
31	DF	Serbia	Nemanja Trajković (to Bačka BP)
19	FW	Serbia	Ognjen Damnjanović (to (Israel) Hapoel Nir Ramat HaSharon)
28	MF	Serbia	Đorđe Ivelja (to Zemun)
15	FW	Ukraine	Bohdan Sichkaruk (to (Ukraine) Chaika Kyiv)
5	DF	Montenegro	Igor Zonjić (to Bežanija)
22	FW	Serbia	Marko Stančetić (to Mačva Šabac)
—	DF	Serbia	Petar Bogdanović (to Radnički Niš, was on loan at Ozren Sokobanja)
—	FW	Cameroon	Michel Vaillant (was on loan, now signed with Mladost Lučani)
17	FW	Serbia	Nikola Nešović (to Sloboda Užice)
93	DF	Serbia	Milan Gašić (to Borac Čačak, was on loan at Temnić)
66	MF	Serbia	Marko Stanojević (on loan to Temnić)
—	DF	Serbia	Matija Pavlović (to Jedinstvo Paraćin)
—	DF	Serbia	Filip Radović (to ČSK Čelarevo)
3	DF	Serbia	Stefan Todorović (to Zemun)
—		Serbia	Dušan Marković (on loan to Moravica Subotinac)
18	MF	Serbia	Nikola Šakić (to Proleter Novi Sad)
97	GK	Serbia	Stefan Stojanović (on loan to Radnički Obrenovac, was on loan at Temnić)
—	MF	Serbia	Filip Krstić (on loan to Jedinstvo Paraćin)
19	MF	Serbia	Marko Ristić (loan extension to Trstenik PPT)
9	FW	Serbia	Darko Lemajić (loan extension to Inđija)
79	FW	Serbia	Andrija Majdevac (on loan to Temnić)
14	MF	Serbia	Vladimir Krstić (to Budućnost Krušik)
45	DF	Serbia	Nikola Radmanovac (on loan to Trstenik PPT)

=== Bačka BP ===
In: Note: Flags indicate national team as defined under FIFA eligibility rules; some limited exceptions apply. Players may hold more than one non-FIFA nationality.

No.	Pos.	Nation	Player
13	DF	Serbia	Goran Smiljanić (from Inđija)
3	DF	Serbia	Miloš Josimov (from Radnički SM)
19	FW	Serbia	Marko Zečević (on loan from Javor Ivanjica)
21	MF	Serbia	Zoran Švonja (from Javor Ivanjica)
22	MF	Serbia	Strahinja Macanović (from Vojvodina)
24	DF	Serbia	Luka Miljević (from Vojvodina)
26	DF	Serbia	Božo Jević (from (Austria) Röthis)
28	MF	Serbia	Luka Luković (from (Switzerland) Biel-Bienne)
27	MF	Serbia	Zoran Milovac (from (Montenegro) Sutjeska Nikšić)
30	MF	Serbia	Arton Zekaj (on loan from Partizan)
15	MF	Serbia	Milorad Balabanović (from Borac Čačak)
25	GK	Serbia	Stefan Čupić (on loan from OFK Beograd)
14	DF	Serbia	Igor Đurić (free, last with (Turkey) Karşıyaka)
—	MF	Serbia	Stefan Kovačević (was on loan, now signed from OFK Beograd)

Out: Note: Flags indicate national team as defined under FIFA eligibility rules; some limited exceptions apply. Players may hold more than one non-FIFA nationality.

No.	Pos.	Nation	Player
69	GK	Serbia	Obren Čučković (released)
—	DF	Serbia	Nikola Stanković (to Radnički Niš)
—	MF	Serbia	Stefan Radoja (retired)
—	DF	Montenegro	Stefan Zogović (loan return to Vojvodina)
—	MF	Bosnia and Herzegovina	Branislav Vasiljević (to (Greece) Diagoras Sevasti)
—	FW	Serbia	Slađan Nikodijević (to ČSK Čelarevo)
—		Serbia	Nemanja Duvnjak (to Krila Krajine)
—	FW	Serbia	Mladen Plavanski (on loan to Radnički Šid, was on loan at Stari Grad)
23	DF	Serbia	Damjan Rodić (on loan to Radnički Šid, previously brought from Stari Grad)
—	DF	Switzerland	Stefan Marinković (to (Bosnia and Herzegovina) Kozara Gradiška)
15	DF	Serbia	Marko Bulat (released, previously brought from (Italy) Hellas Verona)
16	DF	Serbia	Mladen Veselinović (released, previously brought from Sloga PM)
14	DF	Serbia	Nemanja Trajković (to OFK Beograd, previously brought from Napredak Kruševac)
—	DF	Serbia	Zoran Đurić (to Vršac)
—		Serbia	Vuk Đokić (to Tekstilac Odžaci)
25	GK	Serbia	Filip Manojlović (loan return to Red Star Belgrade)

== Serbian First League ==
=== OFK Beograd ===
In: Note: Flags indicate national team as defined under FIFA eligibility rules; some limited exceptions apply. Players may hold more than one non-FIFA nationality.

No.	Pos.	Nation	Player
29	GK	Serbia	Nikola Matek (from Bežanija)
20	MF	Serbia	Lazar Tufegdžić (on loan from Red Star Belgrade)
15	DF	Serbia	Filip Stanković (on loan from Red Star Belgrade)
—	MF	Serbia	Vasilije Đurić (from Red Star Belgrade, to youth team)
18	MF	Serbia	Aleksandar Petrović (from Radnički Obrenovac)
11	FW	Azerbaijan	Branimir Subašić (free, last with the same club)
4	DF	Serbia	Stefan Rudan (from (Armenia) Shirak)
—	FW	Australia	Vladimir Kosovac (free, last with (Australia) Goulburn Valley Suns)
—	MF	Serbia	Mladen Marković (from Hajduk Divoš)
19	FW	Serbia	Mladen Mrakić (from (Slovenia) Krka)
66	DF	New Zealand	Adam Mitchell (on loan from Red Star Belgrade)
—	FW	Serbia	Nikola Čočović (from Budućnost Krušik)
25	DF	Serbia	Nemanja Trajković (from Bačka BP)
27	MF	Serbia	Strahinja Bosanac (from Zemun)
30	FW	Serbia	Nemanja Ratković (from Mačva Šabac)
3	MF	Montenegro	Danilo Bakić (from (Montenegro) OFK Petrovac)

Out: Note: Flags indicate national team as defined under FIFA eligibility rules; some limited exceptions apply. Players may hold more than one non-FIFA nationality.

No.	Pos.	Nation	Player
11	FW	Serbia	Nemanja Vidaković (on loan to (Indonesia) Bali United)
25	DF	Serbia	Aleksandar Radovanović (to Spartak Subotica)
18	MF	Serbia	Aleksandar Pejović (to Mladost Lučani)
13	MF	Serbia	Zlatko Liščević (to Radnik Surdulica)
4	MF	Serbia	Dragomir Vukobratović (to (Poland) Górnik Łęczna)
8	MF	Montenegro	Vladimir Jovović (loan return to Red Star Belgrade)
90	MF	North Macedonia	Daniel Avramovski (loan return to Red Star Belgrade)
10	MF	Serbia	Marko Pavlovski (loan return to (Portugal) Porto)
9	FW	Serbia	Komnen Andrić (to (Portugal) Belenenses)
7	MF	Serbia	Aleksandar Ješić (to Voždovac)
20	MF	Bosnia and Herzegovina	Dario Damjanović (to (Bosnia and Herzegovina) Zvijezda Gradačac)
—	FW	Serbia	Željko Dimitrov (to (Iceland) Fjarðabyggð, was on loan at Kolubara)
14	FW	Serbia	Marko Simić (to Mladost Lučani)
—	MF	Serbia	Aleksandar Martinović (to Metalac G. M.)
34	MF	Montenegro	Nemanja Vlahović (to (Montenegro) Mornar Bar)
5	DF	Serbia	Danijel Stojković (to Radnik Surdulica)
6	DF	Serbia	Bogdan Planić (to Vojvodina)
—		Serbia	Nemanja Branković (to Sinđelić Beograd)
—	DF	Serbia	Filip Sredojević (to OFK Odžaci, was on loan at Smederevo)
19	DF	Montenegro	Vuk Martinović (to (Montenegro) Mladost Podgorica)
33	MF	Serbia	Nemanja Belaković (to (Croatia) Novigrad)
—	GK	Serbia	Toma Koković (to Javor Ivanjica)
—	MF	Serbia	Stefan Kovačević (was on loan, now signed with Bačka BP)
—	MF	Serbia	Miloš Podunavac (to Dorćol)
15	DF	Argentina	Tomás Villoldo (to (Argentina) Deportivo Riestra)
22	MF	Serbia	Pavle Šljivančanin (to ČSK Čelarevo)
—	DF	Serbia	Milovan Filipović (was on loan, now signed with Sloga BB)
—	DF	Serbia	Mile Šarenac (on loan to Radnički Zrenjanin)
23	DF	Serbia	Andrija Mijailović (to Kolubara)
—		Serbia	Miloš Branković (to Napredak Kruševac)
—		Serbia	Darko Terzić (to Železničar Pančevo)
—	MF	Serbia	Božidar Veškovac (on loan to (Belgium) Gent II)
1	GK	Serbia	Stefan Čupić (on loan to Bačka BP)
—	FW	Bosnia and Herzegovina	Stefan Paranos (on loan to Crvena Zvezda MML)
66	DF	Slovenia	Emir Dautović (to (Netherlands) Fortuna Sittard)
55	DF	Serbia	Aranđel Stojković (to Spartak Subotica)
12	GK	Serbia	Đorđe Lazović (released)
14	MF	Serbia	Veljko Nikolić (to Red Star Belgrade)

=== Jagodina ===
In: Note: Flags indicate national team as defined under FIFA eligibility rules; some limited exceptions apply. Players may hold more than one non-FIFA nationality.

No.	Pos.	Nation	Player
12	GK	Serbia	Miroslav Stamenković (loan return from Tabane Trgovački)
20	DF	Serbia	Slađan Mijatović (loan return from Tabane Trgovački)
31	MF	Serbia	Nemanja Đekić (loan return from Tabane Trgovački)
14	MF	Serbia	Nemanja Milošević (loan return from Tabane Trgovački)
33	DF	Serbia	Nikola Vučetić (loan return from Tabane Trgovački)
8	FW	Serbia	Srđan Ristić (loan return from Tabane Trgovački)
5	DF	Serbia	Vukašin Tomić (from Spartak Subotica)
29	MF	Serbia	Stanimir Milošković (from Sloga PM)
18	MF	Serbia	Dušan Petronijević (from Dinamo Vranje)
7	FW	Serbia	Dragan Milovanović (from Metalac G. M.)
77	FW	Serbia	Ivan Pejčić (free, last with Radnički Niš)
21	MF	Serbia	Nikola D. Tasić (from Sloboda Užice)
36	FW	Serbia	Mirko Sekulić (from Novi Pazar)
13	DF	Serbia	Marko Ristić (from (Bosnia and Herzegovina) Slavija Sarajevo)
9	FW	Serbia	Andreja Lazović (loan return from Tabane Trgovački, previously brought from Smederevo)
26	MF	Serbia	Igor Jelić (from (Bosnia and Herzegovina) Travnik)
28	DF	Serbia	Marko Paunović (from Novi Pazar)
—		Serbia	Stefan Zdravković (from Morava Ribare, to youth team)
38	FW	Ghana	Oteng Baah (free)
11	MF	Serbia	Igor Ivanović (loan return from Tabane Trgovački)

Out: Note: Flags indicate national team as defined under FIFA eligibility rules; some limited exceptions apply. Players may hold more than one non-FIFA nationality.

No.	Pos.	Nation	Player
13	GK	Serbia	Đorđe Nikolić (to (Switzerland) Basel)
30	MF	Serbia	Aleksandar Stoimirović (to Dinamo Vranje)
35	FW	Serbia	Aleksandar Jevtić (to Čukarički)
18	MF	Serbia	Dušan Martinović (to (Bosnia and Herzegovina) Radnik Bijeljina)
9	FW	Serbia	Mladen Popović (to Inđija)
8	MF	Serbia	Ivan Cvetković (to Javor Ivanjica)
29	MF	Serbia	Vuk Mitošević (to (Kazakhstan) Aktobe)
1	GK	Serbia	Lazar Tatić (to Radnik Surdulica)
4	DF	Kyrgyzstan	Tamirlan Kozubaev (to (Kyrgyzstan) Dordoi Bishkek)
5	DF	Serbia	Danijel Gašić (to Dinamo Vranje)
17	FW	Serbia	Miroslav Lečić (to (Kazakhstan) Akzhayik)
20	DF	Serbia	Slavko Marić (to Novi Pazar)
10	MF	Serbia	Uroš Nikolić (to (Belarus) Dinamo Minsk)
32	FW	Serbia	Zoran Mihailović (to Kolubara, was on loan at Sloga PM)
7	MF	Serbia	Marko Janković (released, was on loan at Tabane Trgovački)
—	DF	Serbia	Strahinja Bačanin (to Vršac)
—	FW	Serbia	Marko Bačanin (to Vojvodina)
—	DF	Serbia	Siniša Urošević (released, was on loan at Morava Ribare)
—		Serbia	Miloš Radić (on loan to Lugomir)
23	MF	Serbia	Stefan Čolović (to Radnički Pirot)
—	MF	Serbia	Lazar Marčetić (to Morava Ćuprija, was on loan at Tabane Trgovački)
—	MF	Serbia	Mihajlo Mitaković (to Dunav Prahovo)
—	FW	Serbia	Mladen Stoicev (on loan to Sinđelić Niš, was on loan at Tabane Trgovački)
15	DF	Montenegro	Jovan Baošić (to (Montenegro) Jedinstvo Bijelo Polje)
21	MF	Serbia	Mile Savković (to Spartak Subotica)
38	FW	Ghana	Francis Kyeremeh (to Radnik Surdulica)
—	DF	Serbia	Boban Dobrosavljević (on loan to Rembas, was on loan at Morava Ribare)
—	MF	Serbia	Bogdan Jovanović (to Sloga Despotovac, was on loan at Tabane Trgovački)
—		Serbia	Bogdan Vojinović (to Sloga Despotovac)
—	DF	Serbia	Nikola Miladinović (to Budućnost Miliva)
—	DF	Serbia	Ivan Obradović (was on loan, now signed with Levač)
—	DF	Serbia	Luka Gašić (to Radnički Kovači)
12	GK	Serbia	Nikola Simonović (to Bambi Kraljevo)
—	GK	Serbia	Stefan Vasić (on loan to Tabane Trgovački, previously brought from Jedinstvo Vladimirci)
91	FW	Serbia	Vladimir Petrović (on loan to Tabane Trgovački)
14	MF	Serbia	Marko Radosavljević (on loan to Tabane Trgovački)
—	DF	Serbia	Đorđe Petrović (on loan to Tabane Trgovački)
—	MF	Serbia	Nikola Unković (on loan to Tabane Trgovački)
—		Serbia	Marko Živić (on loan to Tabane Trgovački)
—	MF	Serbia	Aleksa Janušević (on loan to Tabane Trgovački)
—	MF	Serbia	Bora Đurić (loan extension to Morava Ribare)
—	MF	Serbia	Lazar Cvetković (to Radan Lebane, was on loan at Tabane Trgovački)
—	DF	Serbia	Vuk Džatić (to Trstenik PPT)
—	MF	Serbia	Miloš Slavković (to Mokra Gora)
—	GK	Serbia	Đorđe Krstić (to Bratstvo Međureč, was on loan at Morava Ribare)
50	DF	Serbia	Marko Mirkailo (loan extension to Tabane Trgovački)
—	DF	Serbia	Lazar Knežević (to Trstenik PPT, was on loan at Tabane Trgovački)
—	DF	Serbia	Aleksandar Cvetković (was on loan, now signed with BSK Borča)
6	DF	Serbia	Aleksandar Filipović (to Voždovac)
—	GK	Serbia	Danijel Milanović (was on loan, now signed with Sloga Despotovac)
19	MF	Serbia	Zoran Knežević (on loan to (Indonesia) Bali United)
—	MF	Serbia	Stefan Petrović (released)

=== ČSK Čelarevo ===
In: Note: Flags indicate national team as defined under FIFA eligibility rules; some limited exceptions apply. Players may hold more than one non-FIFA nationality.

No.	Pos.	Nation	Player
9	FW	Serbia	Slađan Nikodijević (from Bačka BP)
16	MF	Serbia	Marko Kostić (from Dinamo Vranje)
—	DF	Montenegro	Stefan Zogović (on loan from Vojvodina)
—	DF	Serbia	Dimitrije Tomović (on loan from Spartak Subotica)
—	MF	Serbia	Danijel Zlatković (on loan from Spartak Subotica)
4	DF	Serbia	Nemanja Marković (from (Bosnia and Herzegovina) Krupa)
7	MF	Serbia	Miloš Plavšić (from (Slovakia) Iskra Borčice)
17	MF	Serbia	Aleksandar Davidov (from (Greece) Agrotikos Asteras)
13	DF	Serbia	Vukašin Jelić (from Senta)
—	FW	Serbia	Milan Đokić (on loan from Spartak Subotica)
6	DF	Serbia	Dejan Kerkez (on loan from, previously sold to Spartak Subotica)
—	MF	Serbia	Dejan Stojaković (from TSC)
—	MF	Serbia	Pavle Šljivančanin (from OFK Beograd)
—	DF	Serbia	Nebojša Mezei (from Spartak Subotica)
—	FW	Serbia	Aleksandar Crnojački (on loan from Spartak Subotica)

Out: Note: Flags indicate national team as defined under FIFA eligibility rules; some limited exceptions apply. Players may hold more than one non-FIFA nationality.

No.	Pos.	Nation	Player
—	MF	Serbia	Nemanja Stanimirović (loan return to Partizan)
—	MF	Serbia	Pavle Ivelja (loan return to Napredak Kruševac)
7	MF	Serbia	Aleksa Vukanović (to Napredak Kruševac)
9	FW	Serbia	Georgije Ilić (to Napredak Kruševac)
4	MF	Serbia	Boris Varga (to Napredak Kruševac)
18	MF	Montenegro	Savo Gazivoda (to Spartak Subotica)
—	DF	Serbia	Slobodan Lalić (to Inđija)
17	FW	Serbia	Petar Ilić (to Proleter Novi Sad)
—	FW	Serbia	Aleksa Vukomanović (to (Greece) Anagennisi Karditsa)
30	GK	Serbia	Nemanja Romić (to Cement Beočin)
2	DF	Serbia	Miroslav Đekić (to OFK Odžaci)
12	DF	Serbia	Petar Mudreša (to OFK Odžaci)
8	MF	Serbia	Aleksa Mijailović (to OFK Odžaci)
—	MF	Serbia	Marko Ris (on loan to Crvena Zvezda NS, was on loan at Borac Novi Sad)
9	FW	Serbia	Srđan Matić (on loan to Crvena Zvezda NS)
16	MF	Serbia	Dejan Mitrović (on loan to Cement Beočin, was on loan at OFK Odžaci)
—	DF	Serbia	Strahinja Lovre (was on loan, now signed with Krila Krajine)
—		Serbia	Strahinja Ilić (on loan to Budućnost Gložan)
—		Serbia	Milan Medić (on loan to Budućnost Gložan)
5	DF	Serbia	Bojan Kremenović (to TSC)
—		Serbia	Srđan Mirković (on loan to Naša Zvezda)
—	GK	Serbia	Ivan Nemet (on loan to Tekstilac Odžaci)
—		Serbia	Aleksandar Alimpić (on loan to Šajkaš Kovilj)
—		Serbia	Branislav Tucakov (on loan to Budućnost Gložan)
—	DF	Serbia	Filip Radović (on loan to Dunav Stari Banovci, previously brought from Napredak Kruševac)
13	MF	Serbia	Filip Pankarićan (to (Slovakia) Slovan Duslo Šaľa)

=== Inđija ===
In: Note: Flags indicate national team as defined under FIFA eligibility rules; some limited exceptions apply. Players may hold more than one non-FIFA nationality.

No.	Pos.	Nation	Player
13	DF	Serbia	Filip Ivanović (from Sloga PM)
4	DF	Serbia	Slobodan Lalić (from ČSK Čelarevo)
—	MF	Serbia	Danilo Marković (from Jedinstvo Stara Pazova)
16	MF	Serbia	Aleksa Plećaš (from Jedinstvo Stara Pazova)
3	DF	Serbia	Rade Pejić (from Jedinstvo Stara Pazova)
6	MF	Serbia	Saša Višnjić (from Dunav Stari Banovci)
20	FW	Serbia	Dušan Ivković (from Donji Petrovci)
22	FW	Serbia	Zoran Komazec (from Proleter Novi Sad)
14	FW	Serbia	Miloš Živanović (from (Bosnia and Herzegovina) Mladost V. O.)
2	MF	Serbia	Dino Dolmagić (from Sloboda Užice)
9	FW	Serbia	Mladen Popović (from Jagodina)
69	FW	Serbia	Darko Lemajić (loan extension from Napredak Kruševac)
19	FW	Serbia	Aleksandar Rakić (from (Armenia) Gandzasar Kapan)

Out: Note: Flags indicate national team as defined under FIFA eligibility rules; some limited exceptions apply. Players may hold more than one non-FIFA nationality.

No.	Pos.	Nation	Player
2	DF	Montenegro	Stefan Vico (loan return to Rad)
10	FW	Serbia	Dejan Georgijević (to Voždovac)
13	DF	Serbia	Goran Smiljanić (to Bačka BP)
15	DF	Montenegro	Andrija Simunović (to (Montenegro) Bokelj)
30	MF	Serbia	Srđan Dimitrov (to (Malta) Birkirkara)
23	DF	Serbia	Predrag Jović (to (Malta) Birkirkara)
—	MF	Serbia	Marko Krasić (to Radnički 1923, was on loan at (Canada) Serbian White Eagles)
6	DF	Serbia	Milan Ilić (to Radnički 1923)
22	MF	Serbia	Stefan Bogićević (to Loznica)
19		Serbia	Miroslav Đurovka (to Cement Beočin)
5	DF	Serbia	Dragomir Nikolić (to OFK Osečina)
—	FW	Serbia	Miloš Savanović (on loan to Sloga Temerin, previously brought from OFK Hajduk)
—	MF	Serbia	Stefan Stevanović (to Radnički Kovači)
—		Serbia	Aleksandar Sokolović (to Železničar Inđija)
—		Serbia	Nikola Cimeša (to Železničar Inđija)
—		Serbia	Miloš Jović (to Ljukovo)
9	FW	Serbia	David Knežević (to Sremac Vojka)
28	MF	Serbia	Slavoljub Đokić (to Lokomotiva Beograd)

=== Bežanija ===
In: Note: Flags indicate national team as defined under FIFA eligibility rules; some limited exceptions apply. Players may hold more than one non-FIFA nationality.

No.	Pos.	Nation	Player
70	GK	Serbia	Marko Lazarević (from Brodarac 1947)
2	DF	Serbia	Marko Mijailović (loan extension from Red Star Belgrade)
9	FW	Bosnia and Herzegovina	Marko Mitrušić (from Donji Srem)
10	DF	Serbia	Draško Đorđević (from Donji Srem)
3	DF	Serbia	Luka Savićević (from Brodarac 1947)
4	MF	Montenegro	Jovan Čađenović (on loan from Partizan)
20	DF	Montenegro	Igor Zonjić (from Napredak Kruševac)
—	FW	Serbia	Nikola Milošević (from Proleter Novi Sad)
—	DF	Slovakia	Marko Turan (from Srem Jakovo)
12	GK	Canada	Jovan Lučić (from Vršac)
11	MF	Serbia	Nenad Simić (from Loznica)
5	MF	Serbia	Dušan Mihajlović (from Bačka 1901)
13	DF	Serbia	Milenko Škorić (from Brodarac 1947)
—	MF	Serbia	Marko Čakarević (from Brodarac 1947)
6	MF	Serbia	Nikola Jovanović (on loan from Red Star Belgrade)
18	DF	Serbia	Miloš Stojanović (loan extension from Red Star Belgrade)
7	MF	Serbia	Stefan Milojević (from Borac Čačak)
16	MF	Serbia	Marko Vučetić (from Radnik Surdulica)
15	FW	Serbia	Saša Varga (from (Spain) Jumilla)
14	FW	Serbia	Milan Perić (from (China) Qingdao Red Lions)
—	MF	Serbia	Dejan Babić (from (Israel) Maccabi Yavne)
—	MF	Montenegro	Balša Peličić (from (Montenegro) Rudar Pljevlja)
—	FW	Serbia	Ljubomir Delić (from Srem Jakovo)
22	GK	Serbia	Milovan Lekić (from (Montenegro) Bokelj)
—	FW	Kyrgyzstan	Viktor Kelm (from (Kyrgyzstan) Kara-Balta)

Out: Note: Flags indicate national team as defined under FIFA eligibility rules; some limited exceptions apply. Players may hold more than one non-FIFA nationality.

No.	Pos.	Nation	Player
1	GK	Serbia	Filip Manojlović (loan return to Red Star Belgrade)
11	MF	Serbia	Dušan Živković (loan return to Red Star Belgrade)
16	MF	Serbia	Lazar Tufegdžić (loan return to Red Star Belgrade)
12	GK	Serbia	Nikola Matek (to OFK Beograd)
10	MF	Serbia	Nenad Lukić (to Radnik Surdulica)
—	FW	Serbia	Jovan Džiknić (to Sopot)
—	GK	North Macedonia	Lazar Djorejlijevski (to Dorćol)
5	DF	Serbia	Darko Gojković (to (Uzbekistan) Kokand 1912)
3	DF	Serbia	Nikola Valentić (to (Uzbekistan) Kokand 1912)
9	FW	Serbia	Miloš Đorđević (to Dinamo Vranje)
21	MF	Serbia	Milan Janjić (to Budućnost Dobanovci)
—	MF	Serbia	Nenad Milovanović (to Crvena Zvezda MML)
29	DF	Serbia	Božidar Stanimirović (to Žarkovo)
—	GK	Serbia	Andreja Radosavljević (on loan to Crvena Zvezda MML, previously brought from Sremac Vojka)
—	GK	Bosnia and Herzegovina	Jovica Jovanović (to Torlak)
—		Serbia	Dušan Vukadinović (to Zmaj Zemun)
—		Serbia	Jovan Mijailović (to Zmaj Zemun)
—	FW	Serbia	Darko Đukić (to Jedinstvo Putevi)
—	DF	Serbia	Nikola Todorović (on loan to Loznica, previously brought from the same club)
13	DF	Serbia	Dejan Parezanović (to Spartak Subotica)
—	FW	Serbia	Miloš Kukolj (loan return to Partizan)
—	MF	Serbia	Igor Krmar (on loan to (Canada) Hamilton City, previously brought from (Bosnia and Herzegovina) Slavija Sarajevo)
—	FW	Serbia	Anto Vasović (to Zemun, was on loan at Crvena Zvezda MML)
—	FW	Serbia	Marko Rajić (to Žarkovo)
—	MF	Serbia	Nikola Lekić (released)
—	MF	Serbia	Miloš Šaka (released, previously brought from Brodarac 1947)
—	MF	South Korea	Kim Do-Woo (released)
—	MF	Serbia	Nikola Divac (on loan to Budućnost Dobanovci)
—		Serbia	Stefan Branković (released)

=== Sinđelić Beograd ===
In: Note: Flags indicate national team as defined under FIFA eligibility rules; some limited exceptions apply. Players may hold more than one non-FIFA nationality.

No.	Pos.	Nation	Player
—	DF	Serbia	Nemanja Branković (from OFK Beograd)
—	FW	Serbia	Dušan Vukčević (from Partizan)
—	FW	Serbia	Nenad Živković (from (Japan) Kagoshima United)
—	GK	Serbia	Nikola Simić (from Srem Jakovo)
—	DF	Germany	Stefan Kukoljac (on loan from Voždovac)
—	FW	Serbia	Marko Golubović (on loan from Partizan)
—	FW	Serbia	Nikola Rakić (from Donji Srem)
—	MF	Bosnia and Herzegovina	Tigran Goranović (from (Switzerland) Servette)
—	MF	Serbia	Stefan Paštar (on loan from Čukarički)
—	GK	Serbia	Dušan Čubraković (on loan from Čukarički)
—	MF	Serbia	Uroš Milošević (from Teleoptik)
—	MF	Serbia	Stefan Šapić (on loan from Čukarički)
—	DF	Serbia	Filip Davidović (from Sloboda Užice)
—	DF	Montenegro	Marko Vidović (from (Albania) Partizani Tirana)

Out: Note: Flags indicate national team as defined under FIFA eligibility rules; some limited exceptions apply. Players may hold more than one non-FIFA nationality.

No.	Pos.	Nation	Player
—	MF	Serbia	Uroš Damnjanović (loan return to Partizan)
—	FW	Montenegro	Nikola Zvrko (loan return to Čukarički)
—	DF	Serbia	Dušan Ivanov (to Radnički Niš)
—	MF	Serbia	Stefan Dimić (loan return to Čukarički)
—	DF	Serbia	Miloš Petrušić (to Smederevo)
—	MF	Serbia	Miloš Ožegović (to Radnički Pirot)
—		Serbia	Mihailo Aksentijević (to Hajduk Beograd)
—		Serbia	Jug Daković (to Zvezdara)
—	MF	Serbia	Luka Smiljanić (to Balkan Mirijevo)
—	DF	Serbia	Petar Šušnjar (to Dorćol)
—	MF	Serbia	Đorđe Radovanović (to Dinamo Vranje)
—	FW	Serbia	Luka Nikolić (to Torlak)
—	DF	Serbia	Miloš Crnomarković (released)

=== Kolubara ===
In: Note: Flags indicate national team as defined under FIFA eligibility rules; some limited exceptions apply. Players may hold more than one non-FIFA nationality.

No.	Pos.	Nation	Player
23	DF	Serbia	Bojan Mijailović (on loan from Metalac G. M.)
1	GK	Serbia	Jovan Vićić (on loan from Red Star Belgrade)
8	FW	North Macedonia	Dragan Čadikovski (from (Austria) Gleinstätten)
4	DF	Bosnia and Herzegovina	Milovan Petrić (from Proleter Novi Sad)
9	FW	Serbia	Miloš Reljić (from Sloga PM)
13	DF	Serbia	Milan Jagodić (from Zemun)
—	DF	Serbia	Nenad Sević (on loan from Javor Ivanjica)
11	DF	Serbia	Miloš Brajović (from (Slovakia) ŠK Senec)
12	GK	Serbia	Dušan Puletić (from BSK Borča)
—	DF	Serbia	Andrija Mijailović (from OFK Beograd)
16	FW	Serbia	Aleksandar Dimitrić (on loan from Javor Ivanjica)
2	FW	Serbia	Marko Rajković (from (Albania) Apolonia Fier)
19	DF	Serbia	Milan Gašić (on loan from Borac Čačak)

Out: Note: Flags indicate national team as defined under FIFA eligibility rules; some limited exceptions apply. Players may hold more than one non-FIFA nationality.

No.	Pos.	Nation	Player
11	FW	Serbia	Željko Dimitrov (loan return to OFK Beograd)
13	MF	Serbia	Aleksandar Stojković (to Dinamo Vranje)
4	MF	Serbia	Marko Obradović (to Železničar Lajkovac)
9	FW	Serbia	Bojan Zoranović (to Dinamo Vranje)
2	DF	Montenegro	Vasilije Radenović (to (Montenegro) Mladost Podgorica)
5	DF	Serbia	Vladimir Bubanja (to Metalac G. M.)
—	DF	Serbia	Nenad Radosavljević (to Radnički Valjevo)
3	DF	Serbia	Danijel Morariju (to Austria Salzburg)
6	DF	Serbia	Danilo Milošević (to (Germany) Viktoria 06 Griesheim)
—		Serbia	Lazar Petrović (to Stepojevac Vaga)
—		Serbia	Aleksandar Blagojević (to Stepojevac Vaga)
25	GK	Serbia	Uroš Matić (released)
—	MF	Serbia	Mladen Mitrović (to Železničar Lajkovac, was on loan Turbina Vreoci)
15	FW	Serbia	Đorđe Ivković (to Spartak Ljig)
—		Serbia	Nikola Petković (on loan to Turbina Vreoci, previously brought from the same club)
17		Serbia	Nikola Pranić (on loan to Ribnica Mionica)
22	FW	Serbia	Zoran Mihailović (on loan to Brodarac 1947, previously brought from Jagodina)
—	FW	Serbia	Vuk Lazić (on loan to TEK Sloga, previously brought from Stepojevac Vaga)
12	GK	Serbia	Nenad Ranković (to Turbina Vreoci)
—	GK	Serbia	Nenad Ostojić (on loan to Šumadija Šopić)
16	FW	Serbia	Nemanja Obrenović (on loan to Brodarac 1947)
8	FW	Serbia	Milanko Rašković (to (Malta) S.K. Victoria Wanderers)
16		Serbia	Marko Mazić (on loan to Turbina Vreoci, previously brought from Javor Ivanjica)

=== Proleter Novi Sad ===
In: Note: Flags indicate national team as defined under FIFA eligibility rules; some limited exceptions apply. Players may hold more than one non-FIFA nationality.

No.	Pos.	Nation	Player
32	GK	Serbia	Vladan Elesin (from Cement Beočin)
13	FW	North Macedonia	Strahinja Krstevski (from Vojvodina)
15	MF	Bosnia and Herzegovina	Darko Jović (from Vojvodina)
3	DF	Serbia	David Hrubik (on loan from Vojvodina)
14	MF	Serbia	Uroš Stamenić (on loan from Vojvodina)
8	MF	Serbia	Nikola Šakić (from Napredak Kruševac)
4	DF	Serbia	Aleksandar Andrejević (from Donji Srem)
10	MF	Serbia	Marko Đurišić (loan extension from Vojvodina)
18	MF	Serbia	Dejan Milićević (from (Austria) Röthis)
7	MF	Serbia	Dragan Karanov (was on loan, now signed from Vojvodina)
2	DF	Serbia	Milan Lazarević (on loan from, previously sold to Vojvodina)
17	FW	Serbia	Miloš Manojlović (from Spartak Subotica)
20	FW	Serbia	Petar Ilić (from ČSK Čelarevo)
5	DF	Serbia	Filip Babić (from Sloboda Užice)
11	FW	Serbia	Nemanja Stojšić (from Hajduk Novi Sad)
9	FW	Serbia	Milan Mirosavljev (from (Montenegro) Budućnost Podgorica)
—	FW	Ghana	Bismarck Appiah (from (Botswana) Gaborone United)
—	MF	Serbia	Filip Đorđević (from Car Konstantin)
21	DF	Serbia	Boris Milekić (from Sloboda Užice)

Out: Note: Flags indicate national team as defined under FIFA eligibility rules; some limited exceptions apply. Players may hold more than one non-FIFA nationality.

No.	Pos.	Nation	Player
18	MF	Serbia	Lazar Zličić (loan return to Vojvodina)
11	FW	Serbia	Saša Ćurko (loan return to Vojvodina)
3	DF	Serbia	Nikola Vukajlović (to (Czech Republic) Viktoria Plzeň youth squad)
—	MF	Serbia	Stevan Leškov (to (Germany) TSV Milbertshofen, was on loan at OFK Odžaci)
13	DF	Serbia	Nenad Kočović (to Borac Čačak)
15	DF	Serbia	Goran Švonja (on loan to (Canada) Serbian White Eagles)
4	DF	Bosnia and Herzegovina	Milovan Petrić (to Kolubara)
22	FW	Serbia	Nikola Milošević (to Bežanija)
21	MF	Serbia	Aleksandar Desančić (released)
20	DF	Serbia	Nikola Fimić (to (United States) OKWU Eagles, scholarship)
32	GK	Serbia	Nemanja Buzadžija (to Indeks Novi Sad)
—		Serbia	Stanko Radosavljević (to Srbobran)
10	FW	Serbia	Zoran Komazec (to Inđija)
6	DF	Serbia	Dejan Peković (to Crvena Zvezda NS)
14	DF	Serbia	Nemanja Kojčić (on loan to Crvena Zvezda NS)
2	DF	Serbia	Srđan Vukaljević (on loan to Sloga Temerin)
—	MF	Serbia	Nikola Bogdanić (on loan to Sloga Temerin)
—		Serbia	Miloš Ubović (on loan to Srbobran, previously brought from Indeks Novi Sad)
—	MF	Serbia	Nikola Vujičić (to Bačka 1901, was on loan at OFK Odžaci)
24	FW	Serbia	Milorad Janjuš (released)
—		Serbia	Miloš Vukov (on loan to Titel)
—	MF	Serbia	Vladimir Ilić (on loan to Cement Beočin, previously brought from Vojvodina)

=== BSK Borča ===
In: Note: Flags indicate national team as defined under FIFA eligibility rules; some limited exceptions apply. Players may hold more than one non-FIFA nationality.

No.	Pos.	Nation	Player
—	DF	Serbia	Miroslav Radak (loan return from Dolina Padina)
12	GK	Serbia	Matija Šegavac (from Donji Srem)
—	MF	Serbia	Milan Jokić (from Spartak Subotica)
—	MF	Serbia	Stefan S. Tripković (from Voždovac)
—	DF	Serbia	Nikola Todorić (from Metalac G.M.)
—	FW	Serbia	Dušan Vujadinović (from Borac Čačak)
—	MF	Serbia	Dimitrije Pobulić (from Brodarac 1947)
—	DF	Serbia	Zlatko Iličić (from Red Star Belgrade)
—	DF	Serbia	Marko Marinković (was on loan, now signed from Red Star Belgrade)
—	DF	Serbia	Aleksandar Cvetković (was on loan, now signed from Jagodina)
—	FW	Serbia	Vojkan Sarajlin (from Vršac)
—	DF	Serbia	Stefan Mačković (from Omladinac NB)
—	FW	Serbia	Feđa Baletić (from Cement Beočin)
—	DF	Montenegro	Kostadin Mikić (from Partizan)
—	MF	China	Zhu Zhengyu (on loan from (China) Shanghai SIPG)
—	FW	Bosnia and Herzegovina	Miloš Bajić (from Mladost Lučani)
—	DF	Montenegro	Vasilije Radenović (from (Montenegro) Mladost Podgorica)
—	DF	Croatia	Predrag Počuča (free, last with (Singapore) Tampines Rovers)

Out: Note: Flags indicate national team as defined under FIFA eligibility rules; some limited exceptions apply. Players may hold more than one non-FIFA nationality.

No.	Pos.	Nation	Player
11	FW	Serbia	Nikola Radović (to Radnik Surdulica)
10	MF	Serbia	Jordan Jovanović (to Javor Ivanjica)
13	MF	Nigeria	Okomajin Segun Onimisi (to Dinamo Vranje)
12	GK	Serbia	Dušan Puletić (to Kolubara)
18	DF	Serbia	Petar Spasić (to (Montenegro) Dečić)
—		Serbia	Vladimir Erčić (on loan to Borac Sakule)
—		Serbia	Dušan Manić (on loan to Borac Sakule)
—	FW	Serbia	Predrag Simić (to Dorćol)
—	DF	Serbia	Marko Lazarević (to Crvena Zvezda MML)
—		Serbia	Nenad Vukojević (to PKB Padinska Skela)
—	DF	Serbia	Veljko Stanić (to Tabane Trgovački)
—		Serbia	Ivan Prančić (to Brodarac 1947)
—	MF	Serbia	Mićun Bujišić (Brodarac 1947)
—	MF	Serbia	Nemanja Celin (on loan to Železničar Pančevo)
—	FW	Serbia	Renato Lapčević (to Jedinstvo SP, was on loan at Dunav Stari Banovci)
—	GK	Serbia	Siniša Babić (on loan to Sremac Vojka)
—		Serbia	Nikola Vladisavljević (on loan to Sremac Vojka)
—	FW	Serbia	Nikola Mrkić (to GSP Polet)
—	MF	Serbia	Miloš Andrejić (to Radnički Beograd)
—		Serbia	Andrija Arsić (to Žitorađa)
—	MF	Serbia	Igor Cilibanov (to BASK)
—	DF	Serbia	Stefan Stanković (on loan to Loznica)
—	DF	Serbia	Stefan Savić (to Dinamo Pančevo, previously brought from Sloga PM)

=== Zemun ===
In: Note: Flags indicate national team as defined under FIFA eligibility rules; some limited exceptions apply. Players may hold more than one non-FIFA nationality.

No.	Pos.	Nation	Player
—	MF	Bosnia and Herzegovina	Amer Osmanagić (from Novi Pazar)
—	FW	Serbia	Vuk Sotirović (from Borac Čačak)
—	MF	Serbia	Stefan Dimić (from Čukarički)
—	GK	Serbia	Bojan Jović (from (Bosnia and Herzegovina) Rudar Kakanj)
—	MF	Serbia	Nikola Beljić (from (Greece) Acharnaikos)
—	MF	Serbia	Stevan Luković (from Mladost Lučani)
—	FW	Montenegro	Stefan Denković (from (Thailand) Samut Sakhon City Power)
—	DF	Bosnia and Herzegovina	Željko Đokić (from (Bosnia and Herzegovina) Borac Banja Luka)
—	MF	Serbia	Đorđe Ivelja (from Napredak Kruševac)
—	MF	Sierra Leone	Mustapha Bangura (from Borac Čačak)
—	DF	Serbia	Stefan Radovanović (from Radnik Surdulica)
—	FW	Serbia	Nenad Injac (free, last with (Greece) Ergotelis)
—	DF	Serbia	Vladimir Bubanja (from Metalac G. M.)
—	DF	Serbia	Nemanja Zlatković (from Novi Pazar)
—	MF	Serbia	Mihajlo Cakić (free, last with (Moldova) Sheriff Tiraspol)
—	DF	Serbia	Vladimir Branković (from Spartak Subotica)
—	MF	Serbia	Nenad Lukić (on loan from Radnik Surdulica)
—	MF	Serbia	Igor Stanojević (from Metalac G. M.)
—	FW	Serbia	Anto Vasović (from Bežanija)
—	MF	Bosnia and Herzegovina	Savo Đokić (from Rad, to youth team)

Out: Note: Flags indicate national team as defined under FIFA eligibility rules; some limited exceptions apply. Players may hold more than one non-FIFA nationality.

No.	Pos.	Nation	Player
—	GK	Serbia	Srđan Ostojić (to (Kazakhstan) Akzhayik)
—	GK	Serbia	Marko Trkulja (loan return to Red Star Belgrade)
—	FW	Serbia	Miodrag Gemović (loan return to Čukarički)
—	MF	Serbia	Goran Brkić (to (Bosnia and Herzegovina) Mladost Doboj Kakanj)
—	DF	Serbia	Milan Jagodić (to Kolubara)
—	MF	Montenegro	Bojan Magud (released)
—	FW	Serbia	Slobodan Dinčić (to (Montenegro) Grbalj)
—	DF	Serbia	Aleksa Milošević (on loan to Milutinac, previously brought from Lokomotiva Beograd)
—		Serbia	Predrag Kovačević (on loan to Milutinac)
—	MF	Serbia	Luka Bilanović (on loan to Milutinac)
—	FW	Serbia	Stefan Beko (released)
—	MF	Guinea	Ibrahima Sory Camara (released)
—	FW	Serbia	Goran Potkozarac (to OFK Odžaci)
—	MF	Serbia	Strahinja Bosanac (to OFK Beograd, was on loan at Radnički Beograd)
—	MF	Serbia	Nemanja Stojanović (to Sloga BB)
—	DF	Serbia	Miloš Zečević (to Polet Nakovo)
—	MF	Serbia	Mladen Preradović (loan extension to Dorćol)
—	MF	Serbia	Nikola Kokir (to BSK Batajnica, was on loan at Dunav Stari Banovci)
—	MF	Serbia	Miloš Cupać (to BSK Batajnica)
—		Serbia	Miloš Gudović (to BSK Batajnica)
—	DF	Serbia	Aleksandar Miodragović (on loan to Radnički Beograd, previously brought from IM Rakovica)
—		Serbia	Stefan Stašić (to Sopot)
—	DF	Serbia	Nikola Žerjal (to IMT)
—	DF	Serbia	Stefan Todorović (on loan to Dunav Stari Banovci, previously brought from Napredak Kruševac)
—	DF	Serbia	Nebojša Đukić (to (Austria) Mötz/Silz)
—	FW	Canada	Aleksa Marković (on loan to Radnički Beograd)
—	GK	Serbia	Miloš Krunić (on loan to IM Rakovica, was on loan at Srem Jakovo)
—	MF	Serbia	Nikola Pantović (to (Hungary) Szolnoki MÁV)
—	MF	Serbia	Slaviša Jeremić (to Žarkovo)
—	MF	Serbia	Jovan Jevtić (on loan to IM Rakovica)
—	DF	Serbia	Dušan Došljak (released)
—	DF	Serbia	Nemanja Jevtić (to (Croatia) Vinogradar, was on loan at Budućnost Dobanovci)
—	MF	Serbia	Marko Basara (to Žarkovo)
—	DF	Serbia	Danilo Kuzmanović (to (Sweden) Täby FK)

=== Dinamo Vranje ===
In: Note: Flags indicate national team as defined under FIFA eligibility rules; some limited exceptions apply. Players may hold more than one non-FIFA nationality.

No.	Pos.	Nation	Player
1	GK	Serbia	Miroslav Grujičić (from Radnik Surdulica)
5	DF	Serbia	Aleksandar Simov (from Metalac GM)
4	DF	Serbia	Nikola Jovanović (from Loznica)
3	MF	Nigeria	Okomajin Segun Onimisi (from BSK Borča)
22	MF	Serbia	Ninoslav Karapandžić (from Moravac Mrštane)
26	FW	Serbia	Marjan Petrović (from Vranjska Banja)
7	MF	Serbia	Nikola Stefanović (from (Bosnia and Herzegovina) Drina Zvornik)
—		Serbia	Aleksandar Jović (from Borac Sakule)
8	MF	Serbia	Nikola Mitić (from Žarkovo)
9	FW	Serbia	Miloš Đorđević (from Bežanija)
20	DF	North Macedonia	Nikola Stojanović (from Radnik Surdulica)
—	GK	Serbia	Goran Ristić (from BSK Bujanovac, became goalkeeper coach)
30	MF	Serbia	Aleksandar Stojković (from Kolubara)
17	FW	Ghana	Zakaria Suraka (from Radnik Surdulica)
—	MF	Belarus	Ilya Tyunis (from (Belarus) Neman Stolbtsy)
45	DF	Serbia	Danijel Gašić (from Jagodina)
25	DF	Serbia	Milan Stanković (from Radan Lebane)
—	GK	Serbia	Radomir Petrović (from Ropotovo)
27	MF	Serbia	Aleksandar Stoimirović (from Jagodina)
11	MF	Serbia	Đorđe Radovanović (from Sinđelić Beograd)
88	GK	Serbia	Miloš Vesić (free, last with Radnički 1923)
16	FW	Serbia	Bojan Zoranović (from Kolubara)
19	FW	Serbia	Željko Dimitrov (from (Iceland) Fjarðabyggð)
—	FW	Serbia	Lazar Vučeljić (from (Switzerland) Suhr)

Out: Note: Flags indicate national team as defined under FIFA eligibility rules; some limited exceptions apply. Players may hold more than one non-FIFA nationality.

No.	Pos.	Nation	Player
5	DF	Serbia	Milan Nedučić (to (Bosnia and Herzegovina) Mladost Doboj Kakanj)
31	GK	Serbia	Nikola Vujanac (to (North Macedonia) Sileks)
16	MF	Serbia	Nemanja Andesilić (to (Austria) Rohrbach)
9	FW	Serbia	Zoran Baljak (Deceased, previously signed with (Slovenia) Maribor)
6	MF	Serbia	Aleksandar Srdić (to (Slovenia) Aluminij)
18	MF	Serbia	Dušan Petronijević (to Jagodina)
19	DF	Serbia	Dragan Stević (to Šapine)
12	FW	Serbia	Ninoslav Nikolić (to Moravac Mrštane)
—	MF	Serbia	Žarko Stanković (released)
—	DF	Serbia	Bojan Andrić (to Radnički Kragujevac, was on loan at Zvižd Kučevo)
7	MF	Serbia	Miloš Janićijević (to (Malta) Mellieħa)
13	MF	Serbia	Marko Kostić (to ČSK Čelarevo)
2	MF	Serbia	Marko Avramović (to (Montenegro) Bokelj)
—	DF	Serbia	Miljan Stojanović (on loan to Radan Lebane, previously brought from Radnik Surdulica)
50	GK	Serbia	Miodrag Mladenović (on loan to Vlasina)
3	DF	Bosnia and Herzegovina	Ognjen Šinik (to Šumadija Aranđelovac)
20	MF	Serbia	Stefan Nikolić (to Vranjska Banja)
—	MF	Serbia	Marko Nestorović (released)
21	MF	Serbia	Nikola S. Arsić (to Morava Vladičin Han)
—	GK	Serbia	Milan Vojinović (to Morava Vladičin Han, was on loan at Vranjska Banja)
4	DF	Serbia	Nikola Filipović (to Morava Vladičin Han)
17	DF	Serbia	Nikola Anđelković (to Radan Lebane)
—	MF	Lithuania	Tomas Dapkus (to (Lithuania) Vytis Vilniaus)

=== OFK Odžaci ===
In: Note: Flags indicate national team as defined under FIFA eligibility rules; some limited exceptions apply. Players may hold more than one non-FIFA nationality.

No.	Pos.	Nation	Player
—	DF	Serbia	Miroslav Đekić (from ČSK Čelarevo)
—	DF	Serbia	Petar Mudreša (from ČSK Čelarevo)
—	MF	Serbia	Aleksa Mijailović (from ČSK Čelarevo)
—	DF	Serbia	Filip Sredojević (from OFK Beograd)
—	DF	Bosnia and Herzegovina	Dajan Ponjević (free, last with Bačka BP)
—	MF	Serbia	Ilija Tutnjević (from Cement Beočin)
—	FW	Serbia	Goran Potkozarac (from Zemun)
—	FW	Serbia	Vojislav Balabanović (from Senta)
—	FW	Serbia	Marko Labović (from Dolina Padina)
—	FW	Serbia	Vladimir Vujović (from PKB Padinska Skela)
—	MF	Serbia	Aleksandar Ćovin (from (Bosnia and Herzegovina) Mladost V. O.)

Out: Note: Flags indicate national team as defined under FIFA eligibility rules; some limited exceptions apply. Players may hold more than one non-FIFA nationality.

No.	Pos.	Nation	Player
—	MF	Serbia	Dejan Mitrović (loan return to ČSK Čelarevo)
—	MF	Serbia	Marijan Ćirić (to Borac Šajkaš)
—	FW	Serbia	Boško Papović (to Cement Beočin)
—	MF	Serbia	Nikola Milić (to Cement Beočin)
—	DF	Serbia	Ilija Janković (to Cement Beočin)
—	DF	Serbia	Aleksandar Kršić (to Tekstilac Odžaci)
—	DF	Bosnia and Herzegovina	Zoran Šupić (released)
—	FW	Serbia	Stefan Vukić (to Dunav Prahovo)
—		Serbia	Petar Bijekić (on loan to Zardugar SM)

=== Mačva Šabac ===
In: Note: Flags indicate national team as defined under FIFA eligibility rules; some limited exceptions apply. Players may hold more than one non-FIFA nationality.

No.	Pos.	Nation	Player
5	MF	Serbia	Lazar Ivić (from Sloga PM)
11	FW	Serbia	Marko Memedović (from Sloga PM)
23	DF	Serbia	Dejan Blagojević (from (Bosnia and Herzegovina) Drina Zvornik)
7	FW	Serbia	Marko Stančetić (from Napredak Kruševac)
9	FW	Serbia	Bojan Matić (from Loznica)
12	GK	Serbia	Janko Langura (was on loan, now signed from Loznica)
28	MF	Serbia	Nemanja Krstić (from Loznica)
24	MF	North Macedonia	Perica Stančeski (from (North Macedonia) Metalurg Skopje)

Out: Note: Flags indicate national team as defined under FIFA eligibility rules; some limited exceptions apply. Players may hold more than one non-FIFA nationality.

No.	Pos.	Nation	Player
6	DF	Serbia	Nenad Đukanović (retired)
9	MF	Serbia	Marko Janković (to Budućnost Krušik)
5	DF	Serbia	Darko Isailović (on loan to Provo)
—		Serbia	Dušan Nikolić (on loan to Provo)
—		Serbia	Nikola Vasić (on loan to Provo)
7	FW	Serbia	Kosta Dražić (to Brodarac)
—	MF	Serbia	Petar Rašić (to Srem Jakovo)
16	MF	Serbia	Stefan Đurković (on loan to Provo)
—	DF	Serbia	Nemanja Marković (to Sopot)
4		Serbia	Aleksandar Dragojević (released)
—	FW	Serbia	Nemanja Dobić (released)
—	DF	Serbia	Vladimir Lukić (on loan to Mačva Bogatić)
88	GK	Serbia	Miloš Savić (on loan to Dunav Prahovo)
—		Serbia	Dejan Zrnić (on loan to Radnički Šabac)
28	FW	Serbia	Nemanja Ratković (to OFK Beograd)

=== Budućnost Dobanovci ===
In: Note: Flags indicate national team as defined under FIFA eligibility rules; some limited exceptions apply. Players may hold more than one non-FIFA nationality.

No.	Pos.	Nation	Player
—	MF	Serbia	Milan Janjić (from Bežanija)
—	MF	Serbia	Nikola Nedeljković (from IM Rakovica)
—	DF	Serbia	Marko Rajović (from (Bosnia and Herzegovina) Borac Banja Luka)
—	FW	Bosnia and Herzegovina	Đurađ Dobrijević (from Žarkovo)
—	DF	Serbia	Miloš Tanović (from Dunav Stari Banovci)
—	MF	Switzerland	Svetlan Kosić (from Loznica)
—	FW	Serbia	Milan Šušnjar (from Donji Srem)
—	FW	Bosnia and Herzegovina	Budimir Šarčević (on loan from Čukarički)
—	DF	Bosnia and Herzegovina	Aleksandar Vasiljević (from (Austria) Elektra Wien)
—	MF	Serbia	Nikola Divac (on loan from Bežanija)
—	MF	Serbia	Bojan Miletić (from Brodarac 1947)

Out: Note: Flags indicate national team as defined under FIFA eligibility rules; some limited exceptions apply. Players may hold more than one non-FIFA nationality.

No.	Pos.	Nation	Player
—	MF	Serbia	Branko Lazić (to Hajduk Beograd)
—		Serbia	Rade Santrač (to Zmaj Zemun)
—	GK	Serbia	Periša Santrač (to Zmaj Zemun)
—		Serbia	Filip Milošević (on loan to Jedinstvo Surčin, previously brought from Sremac Vojka)
—	DF	Serbia	Nemanja Jevtić (loan return to Zemun)

=== Radnički Pirot ===
In: Note: Flags indicate national team as defined under FIFA eligibility rules; some limited exceptions apply. Players may hold more than one non-FIFA nationality.

No.	Pos.	Nation	Player
8	MF	Serbia	Miloš Ožegović (from Sinđelić Beograd)
16	MF	Serbia	Stefan Čolović (from Jagodina)
2	DF	Serbia	Stefan Jovanović (from Železničar Lajkovac)
17	DF	Serbia	Miloš Perišić (on loan from Partizan)
—	FW	Serbia	Luka Petrović (from Moravac Mrštane)

Out: Note: Flags indicate national team as defined under FIFA eligibility rules; some limited exceptions apply. Players may hold more than one non-FIFA nationality.

No.	Pos.	Nation	Player
—	GK	Serbia	Miloš Perić (to Radnički Niš)
—	MF	Serbia	Nikola Krstić (to Radan Lebane)
—	DF	Serbia	Luka Simonović (to Železničar Pančevo)
—	MF	Serbia	Nikola Vlajković (to Tabane Trgovački)
—		Serbia	Marko Manić (to Jedinstvo Pirot)
—	GK	Serbia	Boris Dimitrov (loan extension to Balkanski)
—	GK	Serbia	Nemanja Đorđević (loan extension to Lužnica)
—	MF	Serbia	Stefan Todorović (loan extension to Lužnica)
—		Serbia	Nikola Rančić (on loan to Lužnica)
—		Serbia	Nikola Ćirić (on loan to Lužnica)
—		Serbia	Danijel Selimović (was on loan, now signed with Moravac Mrštane)
—	FW	Serbia	Uroš Đurić (on loan to Car Konstantin)
—	DF	Serbia	Marko Davidović (on loan to Jedinstvo Pirot)
—	DF	Serbia	Branislav Pešić (loan extension to Jedinstvo Pirot)
—		Serbia	Lazar Manić (to Balkanski)
—		Serbia	Lazar Filipović (loan extension to Jedinstvo Pirot)
—		Serbia	Miloš Milojević (on loan to Jedinstvo Pirot)
—	GK	Serbia	Milan Filipović (loan extension to Jedinstvo Pirot)
—		Serbia	Filip Đorđev (on loan to Jedinstvo Pirot)
—		Serbia	Željko Stamenković (on loan to Jedinstvo Pirot)
—		Serbia	Nikola Ilić (on loan to Jedinstvo Pirot)
—		Serbia	Veljko Ćirić (on loan to Jedinstvo Pirot)
—		Serbia	Mladen Veljković (on loan to Jedinstvo Pirot)
—		Serbia	Jovan Živković (on loan to Jedinstvo Pirot)

=== Sloboda Užice ===
In: Note: Flags indicate national team as defined under FIFA eligibility rules; some limited exceptions apply. Players may hold more than one non-FIFA nationality.

No.	Pos.	Nation	Player
55	FW	Bosnia and Herzegovina	Uroš Đerić (from Mladost Lučani)
10	FW	Serbia	Nikola Nešović (from Napredak Kruševac)
33	FW	Nigeria	Samuel Nnamani (from Donji Srem)
11	DF	Serbia	Milan Joksimović (from Jedinstvo Putevi)
44	DF	Serbia	Miloš Nikolić (loan return from Sloga BB)
1	GK	Serbia	Dalibor Divac (from Loznica)
4	MF	Serbia	Aleksa Vujić (from Sopot)
21	FW	Serbia	Neven Radaković (from Banat Zrenjanin)
8	FW	Serbia	Dobrivoje Velemir (from (Greece) AEK Athens)
20	MF	Montenegro	Bojan Bigović (from (Bosnia and Herzegovina) Leotar)
—	DF	North Macedonia	Nikola Stojanov (on loan from Javor Ivanjica)
13	MF	Serbia	Nemanja Živković (on loan from Javor Ivanjica)
5	DF	Serbia	Aleksandar Petrović (free, last with (Montenegro) Mornar Bar)
99	MF	Serbia	Stefan Vukmirović (from Borac Čačak)
14	FW	Serbia	Branko Radović (from Budućnost Arilje)
9	DF	Serbia	Momčilo Rudan (from (North Macedonia) Sileks)

Out: Note: Flags indicate national team as defined under FIFA eligibility rules; some limited exceptions apply. Players may hold more than one non-FIFA nationality.

No.	Pos.	Nation	Player
11	FW	Serbia	Nikola Čumić (to Metalac G. M.)
33	MF	Serbia	Dejan Đorđević (to (Malta) Birkirkara)
9	DF	Serbia	Filip Davidović (to Sinđelić Beograd)
—	FW	Serbia	Nikola Šalipur (on loan to FAP)
25	GK	Serbia	Luka Radojičić (on loan to Sloga BB)
21	MF	Serbia	Nikola D. Tasić (to Jagodina)
—	MF	Serbia	Milutin Lazarević (to Stepojevac Vaga)
31	MF	Montenegro	Vuk Đurić (to Sloga BB)
—	DF	Serbia	Boris Marjanović (to Radnički Valjevo)
10	FW	Serbia	Nebojša Vukojičić (to Mokra Gora)
4	DF	Serbia	Filip Babić (to Proleter Novi Sad)
5	DF	Serbia	Boris Milekić (to Proleter Novi Sad)
13	MF	Serbia	Dino Dolmagić (to Inđija)
8	DF	Serbia	Aleksandar Purić (to Jedinstvo Putevi, was on loan at FAP)
—	FW	Serbia	Vuk Kostić (to Drina Ljubovija, previously brought from Srem Jakovo)
55	DF	Serbia	Đorđe Lazović (to Jedinstvo Putevi)
9	FW	Serbia	Marko Vasiljević (to Jedinstvo Putevi, previously brought from Vršac)
—	MF	Serbia	Nemanja Kuštrimirović (to Jedinstvo Putevi, previously brought from Ozren Sokobanja)
44	MF	Serbia	Nemanja Dragutinović (to Sevojno)

== See also ==
- Serbian SuperLiga
- 2016–17 Serbian SuperLiga
- Serbian First League
- 2016–17 Serbian First League
