= Stefan Todorović =

Stefan Todorović may refer to:

- Stefan Todorović (basketball) (born 2002), Serbian basketball player
- Stefan Todorović (footballer) (born 1997), Serbian football player
- Stevan Todorović (1832–1925), Serbian painter
