= Filip Stanković =

Filip Stanković may refer to:

- Filip Stanković (footballer, born 1997), Serbian football defender
- Filip Stanković (footballer, born 2002), Serbian football goalkeeper
