= Marko Paunović =

Serbian footballer

Personal information
- Full name: Marko Paunović
- Date of birth: 28 January 1988 (age 38)
- Place of birth: Zaječar, SFR Yugoslavia
- Height: 1.85 m (6 ft 1 in)
- Position: Centre-back

Youth career
- Timok

Senior career*
Years	Team	Apps	(Gls)
2006–2010	Timok		
2010–2015	Napredak Kruševac	97	(6)
2016	Novi Pazar	0	(0)
2016–2018	Jagodina	25	(0)
2018	FC Haka	25	(2)
2019	Luftëtari	0	(0)
2020	Gnistan	0	(0)
- * Club domestic league appearances and goals as of 28 January 2019

Marko Paunović (Serbian Cyrillic: Марко Пауновић; born 28 January 1988) is a Serbian football centre-back.

== Career ==
He had been a member of Napredak Kruševac from 2010 to 2015. After he was injured he returned to the squad and made his Jelen SuperLiga debut in an away match on 28 May 2014.

After signing for FC Haka in April 2018, he left the club again at the end of 2018.

== Personal life ==
Paunović appeared in spot of "Prolom voda" company, with girlfriend Ana Tenjović.
