= Dušan Ivanov =

Serbian footballer

Personal information
- Full name: Dušan Ivanov
- Date of birth: 17 February 1991 (age 35)
- Place of birth: Niš, SFR Yugoslavia
- Height: 1.90 m (6 ft 3 in)
- Position: Centre back

Youth career
- Radnički Niš

Senior career*
Years	Team	Apps	(Gls)
2007–2008	Radnički Niš	1	(0)
2008–2009	Nacional	0	(0)
2009–2010	Jagodina	1	(0)
2010–2011	Radnički Sombor	32	(4)
2012–2013	Radnički Niš	9	(0)
2013	BSK Borča	4	(0)
2014	Sinđelić Beograd	13	(0)
2014–2015	Donji Srem	1	(0)
2016	Sinđelić Beograd	2	(0)
2016	Radnički Niš	1	(0)
2017	Borac Čačak		
2017–2018	Radomlje	21	(1)
2018	Poli Timișoara	6	(0)
- * Club domestic league appearances and goals

Dušan Ivanov (Serbian Cyrillic: Душан Иванов; born 17 February 1991) is a Serbian retired footballer.

He started career in FK Radnički Niš. He then moved to FK Jagodina he played just one game. He then moved to Radnički Sombor in Serbian First League, where he played two solid two seasons. In 2011, he returned to FK Radnički Niš.

== Honours ==
- Serbian First League: 2011–12
