= Stefan Kukoljac =

Slovenian association football player

Personal information
- Full name: Stefan Kukoljac
- Date of birth: 7 April 1996 (age 30)
- Place of birth: Dortmund, Germany
- Height: 1.85 m (6 ft 1 in)
- Position: Centre back

Youth career
- –2012: Red Star Belgrade
- 2012–2015: Čukarički

Senior career*
Years	Team	Apps	(Gls)
2015–2017	Voždovac	19	(0)
2015–2016	→ Crvena Zvezda MML (loan)	23	(8)
2016–2017	→ Sinđelić Beograd (loan)	11	(3)
2017–2018	Triglav Kranj	14	(2)
2018	BASK	28	(4)
2018–2019	→ Crvena Zvezda MML (loan)	24	(2)
2019	OFK Beograd	14	(1)
- * Club domestic league appearances and goals as of 30 September 2019

Stefan Kukoljac (Serbian Cyrillic: Стефан Кукољац; born 7 April 1996) is a Serbian footballer who plays as a defender for Serbian club OFK Beograd.

== Club career ==
=== Voždovac ===
Born in Dortmund, Kukoljac passed youth categories with Čukarički and also played in Germany for some period of his youth career. In summer 2015, Kukoljac signed with Voždovac, but moved on one-year loan to Crvena zvezda Mali Mokri Lug shortly after. Kukoljac made 23 appearances and scored one goal for the team during the 2015–16 Serbian League Belgrade season, and was elected in the team of Belgrade football association ending of 2015. Kukoljac spent the pre-season training with Voždovac in summer 2016, but later moved on new one-year loan to Sinđelić Beograd.

=== Later career ===
In August 2017, Kukoljac signed a one-year contract with Slovenian club Triglav Kranj. He left Triglav during the winter break in early 2018 and returned to Serbia, playing for lower division sides FK BASK and Crvena Zvezda MML. On 14 July 2019, Kukoljac joined OFK Beograd.

== Career statistics ==
=== Club ===
As of 12 January 2017

Club	Season	League			Cup		Continental		Other		Total	
Club	Season	Division	Apps	Goals	Apps	Goals	Apps	Goals	Apps	Goals	Apps	Goals
Voždovac	2015–16	SuperLiga	0	0	—		—		—		0	0
Voždovac	2016–17	SuperLiga	0	0	—		—		—		0	0
Voždovac	Total		0	0	—		—		—		0	0
Crvena Zvezda MML (loan)	2015–16	League Belgrade	23	1	—		—		—		23	1
Sinđelić Beograd (loan)	2016–17	First League	11	1	0	0	—		—		11	1
Career total			34	2	0	0	—		—		34	2
