= Andrija Mijailović =

Serbian footballer

Personal information
- Full name: Andrija Mijailović
- Date of birth: 7 June 1995 (age 31)
- Place of birth: Belgrade, FR Yugoslavia
- Height: 1.85 m (6 ft 1 in)
- Position: Centre-back

Team information
- Current team: Zemun
- Number: 33

Youth career
- Red Star Belgrade
- Partizan

Senior career*
Years	Team	Apps	(Gls)
2013–2015	Teleoptik	31	(0)
2015	Srem Jakovo	14	(0)
2016	OFK Beograd	1	(0)
2016	Kolubara	0	(0)
2017	Bežanija	1	(0)
2017–2018	Radnički Niš	10	(0)
2019–2021	Zemun	64	(3)
2022–2024	Inđija	66	(2)
2024-	Zemun	19	(0)

International career
2011	Serbia U17		
- * Club domestic league appearances and goals as of 26 December 2023

Andrija Mijailović (Serbian Cyrillic: Андрија Мијаиловић; born 7 June 1995) is a Serbian footballer who plays as a defender for Zemun.

== Club career ==
Mijailović was a member of Red Star Belgrade and Partizan youth categories. He made his first senior appearances during the 2013–14 season, in which he noted Serbian First League 17 caps for Teleoptik. After le left the club, he spent 6 months playing with Srem Jakovo, before he joined Serbian SuperLiga side OFK Beograd at the beginning of 2016. Next he moved to Kolubara, where he spent the first half of the 2016–17 season without official matches. At the beginning of 2017, Mijailović joined Bežanija.
