= Aleksandar Simov =

Serbian footballer

Personal information
- Full name: Aleksandar Simov
- Date of birth: 5 February 1987 (age 39)
- Place of birth: Niš, SFR Yugoslavia
- Height: 1.81 m (5 ft 11 1/2 in)
- Position: Defender

Senior career*
Years	Team	Apps	(Gls)
2005–2009	Radnički Niš	50	(1)
2009–2011	Dender	30	(2)
2011–2013	Radnički Niš	14	(1)
2014–2016	Metalac Gornji Milanovac	44	(5)
2016	Dinamo Vranje	8	(1)
2017–2018	Sinđelić Niš	15	(2)
2019–2020	Budućnost Popovac		
2020–2021	Car Konstantin		
2021–2022	Real Niš		
- * Club domestic league appearances and goals as of 21 July 2018

Aleksandar Simov (Serbian Cyrillic: Александар Симов; born 5 February 1987) is a Serbian retired football defender.
