= Okomayin Segun Onimisi =

Nigerian footballer

Personal information
- Full name: Okomayin Segun Onimisi
- Date of birth: 29 November 1993 (age 32)
- Place of birth: Enugu, Nigeria
- Height: 1.82 m (6 ft 0 in)
- Position: Defensive midfielder

Senior career*
Years	Team	Apps	(Gls)
2011–2014	Enugu Rangers		
2014	Sloga Kraljevo	7	(0)
2015	Zeta	17	(0)
2016	BSK Borča	10	(0)
2016–2019	Dinamo Vranje	97	(2)
2020	Dubočica	15	(0)
- * Club domestic league appearances and goals as of 1 August 2021

Okomayin Segun Onimisi (born 29 November 1993) is a Nigerian footballer who plays as a midfielder.

== Club career ==
Born in Enugu, Onimisi started his senior career with local club Enugu Rangers, where he played between 2011 and 2014. In summer 2014, he moved to Serbian side Sloga Kraljevo, where he made his First League debut in 7 fixture match of the 2014–15 season, against Moravac Mrštane. At the beginning of 2015, Onimisi spent some period on trial with Donji Srem, but later moved to Montenegro and spent the whole 2015 playing with Zeta. He also spent spring half of the 2015–16 Serbian First League season with BSK Borča, before he joined Dinamo Vranje in summer 2016. Onimisi scored first goal since he moved to Europe in 19 fixture match of the 2016–17 Serbian First League between Dinamo Vranje and OFK Odžaci, played on 24 March 2017.

== Career statistics ==
As of 16 June 2018

Appearances and goals by club, season and competition
Club	Season	League			Cup		Continental		Other		Total	
Club	Season	Division	Apps	Goals	Apps	Goals	Apps	Goals	Apps	Goals	Apps	Goals
Sloga Kraljevo	2014–15	Serbian First League	7	0	—		—		—		7	0
Zeta	2014–15	Montenegrin First League	6	0	—		—		—		6	0
Zeta	2015–16	Montenegrin First League	11	0	1	0	—		—		12	4
Zeta	Total		17	0	1	0	—		—		18	0
BSK Borča	2015–16	Serbian First League	10	0	—		—		—		10	0
Dinamo Vranje	2016–17	Serbian First League	24	1	1	0	—		—		25	1
Dinamo Vranje	2017–18	Serbian First League	27	1	1	0	—		—		28	1
Dinamo Vranje	Total		51	2	2	0	—		—		53	2
Career total			85	2	3	0	—		—		88	2
