= Milan Jagodić =

Serbian footballer

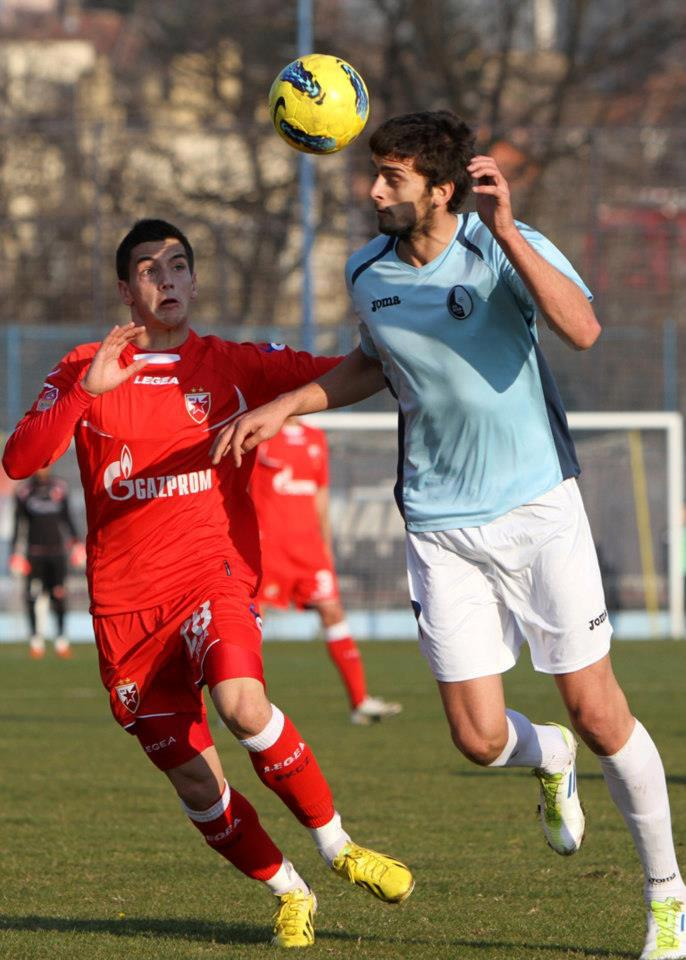
- Jagodić (right) playing for Rad in 2013

Personal information
- Date of birth: 11 March 1991 (age 35)
- Place of birth: Titovo Užice, SFR Yugoslavia
- Height: 1.98 m (6 ft 6 in)
- Positions: Centre-back; defensive midfielder

Team information
- Current team: ATSV Salzburg
- Number: 5

Senior career*
Years	Team	Apps	(Gls)
2010–2011	Sloga Bajina Bašta	18	(0)
2011–2013	Rad	10	(0)
2011–2012	→ Palić (loan)	21	(1)
2012	→ BASK (loan)	13	(0)
2014	Jedinstvo Užice	12	(0)
2015	Mladost Lučani	8	(0)
2016	Zemun	12	(0)
2016–2017	Kolubara	24	(0)
2017–2019	Budućnost Dobanovci	45	(0)
2019–2020	Rad	11	(1)
2020–2021	Al-Ahli		
2022-	ATSV Salzburg	34	(1)
- * Club domestic league appearances and goals as of 23 August 2024

Milan Jagodić (Serbian Cyrillic: Милан Јагодић; born 11 March 1991) is a Serbian professional footballer who plays as a defender.
