= Miloš Manojlović =

Serbian footballer

Personal information
- Full name: Miloš Manojlović
- Date of birth: 25 October 1997 (age 29)
- Place of birth: Šid, FR Yugoslavia
- Height: 1.88 m (6 ft 2 in)
- Position: Striker

Team information
- Current team: Udarnik Višnjevac

Youth career
- OFK Beograd
- Radnički Šid
- Spartak Subotica

Senior career*
Years	Team	Apps	(Gls)
2015–2016	Spartak Subotica	1	(0)
2015–2016	→ Senta (loan)	20	(4)
2016–2018	Proleter Novi Sad	17	(0)
2017	→ Radnički Šid (loan)		
2018	→ Bačka 1901 (loan)		
2018–2020	Bačka 1901		
2021	Hajduk Kula		
2022	Bačka 1901		
2023	Solid Subotica		
2024-	Udarnik Višnjevac		

International career^{‡}
	Serbia U16	2	(0)
- * Club domestic league appearances and goals as of 15 April 2017 ‡ National team caps and goals as of 13 August 2015

Miloš Manojlović (Serbian Cyrillic: Милош Манојловић; born 25 October 1997) is a Serbian football forward who plays for Udarnik Višnjevac.

== Career ==
=== Spartak Subotica ===
Manojlović was a member of OFK Beograd and Radnički Šid youth selections, before he joined Spartak Subotica. He signed a three-year scholarship contract with Spartak as a cadet in 2013. In 2015, he joined the first team and made his Serbian SuperLiga in 5th fixture of 2015–16 season, when he was substituted in from the bench. Manojlović was nominated for the best youth player of FK Spartak in 2015.

== Career statistics ==
As of 15 April 2017

Club performance			League		Cup		Continental		Total	
Season	Club	League	Apps	Goals	Apps	Goals	Apps	Goals	Apps	Goals
Serbia			League		Serbian Cup		Europe		Total	
2015–16	Spartak	SuperLiga	1	0	0	0	0	0	1	0
2015–16	Senta (loan)	Serbian League Vojvodina	20	4	0	0	0	0	20	4
2016–17	Proleter Novi Sad	First League	17	0	1	0	0	0	18	0
Total	Serbia		38	4	1	0	0	0	39	4
Career total			38	4	1	0	0	0	39	4
