= Nikola Milošević (footballer, born 1996) =

Serbian footballer

Personal information
- Date of birth: 8 December 1996 (age 29)
- Place of birth: Birmingham, England
- Height: 1.99 m (6 ft 6 1/2 in)
- Position: Forward

Youth career
- Rad
- Partizan

Senior career*
| Years | Team | Apps | (Gls) |
| 2015 | Srem Jakovo | 7 | (0) |
| 2015–2016 | Proleter Novi Sad | 20 | (2) |
| 2016–2019 | Bežanija | 67 | (16) |
| 2019–2020 | Javor Ivanjica | 8 | (0) |
| 2020 | Proleter Novi Sad | 0 | (0) |
| 2021 | Zvijezda 09 | 5 | (1) |
- * Club domestic league appearances and goals as of 3 April 2021

Nikola Milošević (Serbian Cyrillic: Никола Милошевић; born 8 December 1996) is a Serbian footballer who played as a forward.

== Club career ==
Coming from FK Partizan Academy, he made his senior debut in the second-half of the 2014–15 season playing with Srem Jakovo in the Serbian League Belgrade. Next, he spent a season with Proleter Novi Sad in the Serbian First League, before joining Javor Ivanjica in summer 2019.

== Personal life ==
He was born in England while his father, the former footballer Savo Milošević, played for Aston Villa.

== Career statistics ==
As of 27 August 2019

| Club | Season | League | | | Cup | | Continental | | Other | | Total | |
| Club | Season | Division | Apps | Goals | Apps | Goals | Apps | Goals | Apps | Goals | Apps | Goals |
|---|---|---|---|---|---|---|---|---|---|---|---|---|
| Proleter Novi Sad | 2015–16 | Serbian First League | 20 | 2 | 1 (Note: Appearance(s) in the Serbian Cup.) | 0 | – | | 0 | 0 | 21 | 2 |
| Bežanija | 2016–17 | Serbian First League | 16 | 4 | 0 | 0 | – | | 0 | 0 | 16 | 4 |
| Bežanija | 2017–18 | Serbian First League | 28 | 6 | 1 | 0 | – | | 0 | 0 | 29 | 6 |
| Bežanija | 2018–19 | Serbian First League | 23 | 6 | 0 | 0 | – | | 0 | 0 | 23 | 6 |
| Career total | | | 87 | 18 | 2 | 0 | 0 | 0 | 0 | 0 | 89 | 18 |
