= Boris Milekić =

Serbian footballer

Personal information
- Full name: Boris Milekić
- Date of birth: 29 September 1988 (age 38)
- Place of birth: Užice, SFR Yugoslavia
- Height: 1.94 m (6 ft 4 1/2 in)
- Position: Centre-back

Senior career*
Years	Team	Apps	(Gls)
2006–2007	→ Loznica (loan)	19	(0)
2007	Mačva Šabac	16	(1)
2008–2009	Žepče		
2009	Sloboda Užice	3	(0)
2010–2011	Vujić Voda	33	(0)
2011	Radnički Niš	15	(1)
2012	Inđija	15	(0)
2012	Donji Srem	7	(0)
2013	Jedinstvo Užice	28	(1)
2014	Kolubara	5	(0)
2014–2016	Sloboda Užice	49	(3)
2016–2017	Proleter Novi Sad	10	(0)
2017	Stal Mielec	11	(0)
2017–2019	Metalac Gornji Milanovac	34	(1)
- * Club domestic league appearances and goals

Boris Milekić (Serbian Cyrillic: Борис Милекић; born 29 September 1988) is a Serbian retired footballer who played as a defender.
