= Obren Čučković =

Serbian footballer

Personal information
- Date of birth: 2 May 1983 (age 43)
- Place of birth: Bač, SFR Yugoslavia
- Height: 1.93 m (6 ft 4 in)
- Position: Goalkeeper

Senior career*
Years	Team	Apps	(Gls)
2006–2007	OFK Bačka		
2007–2008	Dinamo Pančevo		
2008–2011	Young Africans		
2011	Azam		
2012	Ho Chi Minh City		
2012–2013	Mladost Podgorica	11	(0)
2014	Blackburn Rovers (RSA)		
2014–2015	Moroka Swallows	1	(0)
2015	OFK Bačka	9	(0)

Managerial career
- 2015–2017: Mora (assistant)
- 2017–2018: OFK Bačka (assistant)
- * Club domestic league appearances and goals

Obren Čučković (Serbian Cyrillic: Обрен Чучковић; born 2 May 1983) is a Serbian retired football goalkeeper.

== Career ==
Born in Bač, Čuković played for OFK Bačka and Dinamo Pančevo before he went abroad. He joined Young Africans from Tanzania in the summer of 2008 and stayed with the club until 2011. Later he was with Azam, and after that he moved to Vietnam, in Ho Chi Minh City. Next he was with Mladost Podgorica in Montenegro for the 2012–13 season, before he moved back to Africa in 2014. After episodes with Blackburn Rovers, and Moroka Swallows in South Africa, he returned to OFK Bačka in the summer of 2015.
