= Stevan Bojović =

Serbian footballer

Personal information
- Full name: Stevan Bojović
- Date of birth: 7 June 1995 (age 31)
- Place of birth: Gornji Milanovac, FR Yugoslavia
- Height: 1.95 m (6 ft 5 in)
- Position: Goalkeeper

Team information
- Current team: Takovo
- Number: 1

Youth career
- Metalac Gornji Milanovac

Senior career*
Years	Team	Apps	(Gls)
2013–2016	Metalac Gornji Milanovac	1	(0)
2014	→ Takovo (loan)	–	(–)
2016	→ Takovo (loan)	14	(0)
2017–	Takovo	4	(0)
- * Club domestic league appearances and goals as of 8 April 2017

Stevan Bojović (Serbian Cyrillic: Стеван Бојовић; born 7 June 1995) is a Serbian professional footballer who plays as a goalkeeper for Takovo.

== Club career ==
=== Metalac Gornji Milanovac ===
Born in Gornji Milanovac, Bojović passed the Metalac Gornji Milanovac youth school, and was a member of generation which made promotion to the best level Serbian youth league in 2014. He has also joined the club first team for the 2013–14 Serbian First League season. After the end of his youth career, he was loaned to Morava Zone League club Takovo for the first half of 2014–15 season. Bojović made his senior debut for Metalac in last fixture of the 2015–16 Serbian SuperLiga season. Bojović was also loaned to Takovo for the first half of 2016–17 season in the Morava Zone League. After he was used as a back-up choice several times in last fixtures of the first half-season in the Serbian SuperLiga, Bojović permanently moved to Takovo in the winter break off-season, as a single-player.

== Career statistics ==
As of 8 April 2017

Club	Season	League			Cup		Continental		Other		Total	
Club	Season	Division	Apps	Goals	Apps	Goals	Apps	Goals	Apps	Goals	Apps	Goals
Metalac Gornji Milanovac	2013–14	Serbian First League	0	0	0	0	—		0	0	0	0
Metalac Gornji Milanovac	2014–15	Serbian First League	0	0	—		—		0	0	0	0
Metalac Gornji Milanovac	2015–16	Serbian SuperLiga	1	0	0	0	—		—		1	0
Metalac Gornji Milanovac	2016–17	Serbian SuperLiga	0	0	—		—		—		0	0
Metalac Gornji Milanovac	Total		1	0	0	0	—		0	0	1	0
Takovo	2014–15	Morava Zone League	—		—		—		—		—	
Takovo	2016–17	Morava Zone League	18	0	—		—		—		18	0
Takovo	Total		18	0	—		—		—		18	0
Career total			19	0	0	0	—		0	0	19	0
