= Nikola Zvrko =

Montenegrin footballer

Personal information
- Full name: Nikola Zvrko
- Date of birth: 7 March 1995 (age 31)
- Place of birth: Podgorica, FR Yugoslavia
- Height: 1.81 m (5 ft 11 1/2 in)
- Position: Forward

Team information
- Current team: Petrovac
- Number: 7

Senior career*
Years	Team	Apps	(Gls)
2013–2016	Čukarički	0	(0)
2014	→ Kom (loan)	14	(3)
2014–2016	→ Sinđelić Beograd (loan)	48	(5)
2016–2018	Mladost Lučani	8	(1)
2018	OFK Bačka	2	(0)
2018–2019	Iskra	17	(1)
2019	Podgorica	12	(0)
2020	Kom	11	(1)
2020–	Petrovac	167	(12)
- * Club domestic league appearances and goals as of 17 June 2026

Nikola Zvrko (Serbian Cyrillic: Никола Зврко; born 7 March 1995) is a Montenegrin professional footballer who plays for Petrovac as a striker.
