= Petar Ilić =

Serbian footballer

Personal information
- Full name: Petar Ilić
- Date of birth: 28 April 1993 (age 33)
- Place of birth: Novi Sad, FR Yugoslavia
- Height: 1.77 m (5 ft 10 in)
- Positions: Forward; winger

Senior career*
Years	Team	Apps	(Gls)
2010–2013	Cement Beočin	37	(5)
2012–2013	→ ČSK Čelarevo (loan)	18	(1)
2013	Donji Srem	2	(0)
2014	Proleter Novi Sad	3	(1)
2014–2015	Borac Banja Luka	34	(2)
2016	ČSK Čelarevo	9	(1)
2016	Proleter Novi Sad	2	(0)
2017	Inđija	7	(0)
2018	Borac Banja Luka	8	(0)
2018–2019	Zvijezda Gradačac	11	(0)
2019–2020	Bečej 1918	3	(0)
2020	Mladost Novi Sad		
2021	Borac Čačak	7	(1)
2021-2022	Rad Zrenjanin		
2022	Kabel		
- * Club domestic league appearances and goals as of 1 September 2019

Petar Ilić (Serbian Cyrillic: Петар Илић; born 28 April 1993) is a Serbian football forward.

== Career ==
At the end of January 2019, Ilić left Zvijezda Gradačac.
