= Strahinja Macanović =

Serbian footballer

Personal information
- Date of birth: 14 March 1997 (age 29)
- Place of birth: Sombor, FR Yugoslavia
- Height: 1.77 m (5 ft 10 in)
- Position: Attacking midfielder

Team information
- Current team: Union Peuerbach
- Number: 10

Youth career
- –2014: Radnički Sombor
- 2014–2016: Vojvodina

Senior career*
Years	Team	Apps	(Gls)
2013–2014	Radnički Sombor	0	(0)
2014–2016	Vojvodina	0	(0)
2016–2017	Bačka Palanka	16	(2)
2018	Radnik Bijeljina	0	(0)
2018–2019	Sloga Gornje Crnjelovo	29	(3)
2019	Radnički Sombor		
2020	FC Roj		
2020	Jedinstvo Brčko		
2021	Hajduk 1912		
2022-2024	SC Melk	39	(6)
2024-	Union Peuerbach	14	(5)

International career
2012	Serbia U17		
- * Club domestic league appearances and goals as of 16 November 2024

Strahinja Macanović (Serbian Cyrillic: Страхиња Мацановић; born 14 March 1997) is a Serbian football midfielder who plays for Austrian outfit Union Peuerbach. He earlier had a spell at Bosnian side Jedinstvo Brčko.

== Career ==
=== Early career ===
Born in Sombor, Macanović started his career with local club Radnički. Playing with youth categories of the club, Macanović was called into Serbia u17 team in 2012 by coach Branislav Nikolić, as the first player of Radnički Sombor who was a member of any national team level after ten years. He joined the first-team in the ending of the 2012–13 Serbian League Vojvodina season and made his senior debut for the club at the age of 16, during the district cup match against Tekstilac Odžaci. Later, Macanović joined FK Vojvodina as a cadet, and stayed the club until summer 2016, when he overgrown youth selection and terminated scholarship contract with club.

=== OFK Bačka ===
In summer 2016, Macanović joined a new SuperLiga club OFK Bačka, and his first one-year professional contract. Macanović scored his first senior goal in sixth fixture of the 2016–17 Serbian SuperLiga season in away match against Rad. As the coincidence, he also scored his second season goal against the same rival in 21 fixture match, played on 14 December 2016 at the Slavko Maletin Vava Stadium, when he was nominated for the man of the match. For the half-season playing as a senior, Macanović made 9 league and 1 cup match against Spartak Subotica, scoring two goals.

== Career statistics ==
As of 1 March 2017

Club	Season	League			Cup		Continental		Other		Total	
Club	Season	Division	Apps	Goals	Apps	Goals	Apps	Goals	Apps	Goals	Apps	Goals
Radnički Sombor	2012–13	Serbian League Vojvodina	0	0	—		—		1	0	1	0
Radnički Sombor	2013–14	Serbian League Vojvodina	0	0	—		—		—		0	0
Radnički Sombor	Total		0	0	—		—		1	0	1	0
Vojvodina	2013–14	Serbian SuperLiga	0	0	0	0	—		—		0	0
Vojvodina	2014–15	Serbian SuperLiga	0	0	0	0	0	0	—		0	0
Vojvodina	2015–16	Serbian SuperLiga	0	0	0	0	0	0	—		0	0
Vojvodina	Total		0	0	0	0	0	0	—		0	0
OFK Bačka	2016–17	Serbian SuperLiga	11	2	1	0	—		—		12	2
Career total			11	2	1	0	0	0	1	0	13	2
