= Anto Vasović =

Serbian footballer

Personal information
- Full name: Anto Vasović
- Date of birth: 15 June 1995 (age 31)
- Place of birth: Belgrade, FR Yugoslavia
- Height: 1.89 m (6 ft 2 1/2 in)
- Position: Centre forward

Team information
- Current team: Lokomotiva Beograd

Senior career*
Years	Team	Apps	(Gls)
2012–2014	Rad	2	(0)
2014	Brodarac 1947	11	(4)
2015	Dorćol	13	(1)
2016	Bežanija	0	(0)
2016	Zemun		
2017	Torlak		
2017-2019	Jedinstvo Surčin		
2020-2021	Prva Iskra Barič		
2022	OFK Osečina		
2022	Brodarac		
2023-	Lokomotiva Beograd		
- * Club domestic league appearances and goals as of 29 June 2015 ‡ National team caps and goals as of 19 May 2013

Anto Vasović (Serbian Cyrillic: Анто Васовић, born June 15, 1995) is a Serbian footballer.

== Club career ==
Born in Belgrade, Vasović made his professional debut for first team on 18 May 2013, in Jelen SuperLiga match versus Hajduk Kula. He began match on the bench and substituted in for Slavko Perović in 80th minute of match.

During the winter break of the 2014–15 season, he joined Serbian League Belgrade side FK Dorćol, after half season spent at same level side FK Brodarac 1947.

== Personal life ==
Anto Vasović is the son of the Serbian water polo player Jugoslav Vasović. His uncle is a water polo player, also named Anto Vasović.
