= Nikola Matek =

Serbian footballer

Personal information
- Full name: Nikola Matek
- Date of birth: 5 October 1990 (age 36)
- Place of birth: Belgrade, SFR Yugoslavia
- Height: 1.87 m (6 ft 2 in)
- Position: Goalkeeper

Senior career*
Years	Team	Apps	(Gls)
2008–2012	OFK Beograd	3	(0)
2010	→ Srem Jakovo (loan)	15	(0)
2013	Metalac Gornji Milanovac	6	(0)
2013	Dolina Padina	9	(0)
2014	Dinamo Pančevo	10	(0)
2015	Vranjska Banja		
2016	Bežanija	2	(0)
2016–2017	OFK Beograd	6	(0)
2017	→ Vršac (loan)	4	(0)
- * Club domestic league appearances and goals as of 4 April 2017

Nikola Matek (Serbian Cyrillic: Никола Матек; born 5 October 1990) is a Serbian football goalkeeper.
