= Miroslav Grujičić =

Serbian footballer

Personal information
- Full name: Miroslav Grujičić
- Date of birth: 17 June 1994 (age 32)
- Place of birth: Belgrade, FR Yugoslavia
- Height: 1.87 m (6 ft 1 1/2 in)
- Position: Goalkeeper

Team information
- Current team: Novohrad Lučenec

Youth career
- BSK Borča

Senior career*
Years	Team	Apps	(Gls)
2011–2012	BSK Borča	4	(0)
2013	Teleoptik	4	(0)
2013–2014	Srem Jakovo	31	(0)
2015–2016	Radnik Surdulica	6	(0)
2016–2017	Dinamo Vranje	9	(0)
2017	Sinđelić Beograd	2	(0)
2018–	Novohrad Lučenec	54	(0)
2020	→ Komárno (loan)	3	(0)
2021	→ ATSV Stadl-Paura (loan)	0	(0)

International career
2012–2013	Serbia U19	6	(0)
- * Club domestic league appearances and goals as of 6 March 2020

Miroslav Grujičić (Serbian Cyrillic: Мирослав Грујичић; born 17 June 1994) is a Serbian football goalkeeper who plays for Novohrad Lučenec.

== Honours ==
Radnik Surdulica

- Serbian First League: 2014–15
