= Miloš Bajić =

Bosnian footballer (born 1994)

Personal information
- Date of birth: 27 April 1994 (age 32)
- Place of birth: Banja Luka, Bosnia and Herzegovina
- Height: 1.83 m (6 ft 0 in)
- Position: Forward

Youth career
- OFK Beograd

Senior career*
Years	Team	Apps	(Gls)
2011	OFK Beograd	1	(0)
2012–2015	Napredak Kruševac	64	(12)
2015–2016	Mladost Lučani	12	(1)
2016–2017	BSK Borča	5	(0)
2017–2019	OFK Bačka	12	(1)
2019–2020	Smederevo 1924	21	(2)
2020–2021	IMT	9	(1)
- * Club domestic league appearances and goals as of 30 November 2020

Miloš Bajić (born 27 April 1994) is a Bosnian footballer who plays as a forward.

== Career ==
=== OFK Beograd ===
Before signing his first professional contract, Bajić was the highest-scoring player in the entire OFK Beograd youth system for players up to 17 years of age. He made his professional debut with OFK Beograd against Red Star Belgrade on 5 November 2011 at the age of 17.

=== Napredak Kruševac ===
On 15 January 2012, OFK Beograd moved Bajić to FK Napredak Kruševac. By the end of the year, he had built a reputation as an exciting prospect with his frequent goal-scoring at such a young age. On 20 October 2012, in a 5–0 win against Sloga Kraljevo, Bajić played only one of 90 minutes of gametime and still scored a goal.

=== Mladost Lučani ===
Bajič joined Mladost Lučani in summer 2015.

== Honours ==
Napredak Kruševac

- Serbian First League: 2012–13
