= Zlatko Liščević =

Serbian footballer

Personal information
- Full name: Zlatko Liščević
- Date of birth: 8 March 1991 (age 35)
- Place of birth: Sombor, SR Serbia, SFR Yugoslavia
- Height: 1.78 m (5 ft 10 in)
- Positions: Midfielder; full-back

Youth career
- Red Star Belgrade

Senior career*
Years	Team	Apps	(Gls)
2009–2012	Red Star Belgrade	0	(0)
2009–2012	→ Sopot (loan)	32	(2)
2012	Kolubara	14	(0)
2013	Metalac Gornji Milanovac	21	(0)
2014	Železničar Lajkovac	22	(0)
2015–2016	OFK Beograd	39	(2)
2016	Radnik Surdulica	5	(0)
2017	Příbram	0	(0)
2017	Bratstvo Prigrevica	8	(0)
2018	Radnički Pirot	12	(1)
2018–2020	Trayal Kruševac	59	(0)
2021–2022	Tekstilac Odžaci		
2022	Dinamo 1923 Bački Breg		
- * Club domestic league appearances and goals as of 10 August 2018

Zlatko Liščević (Serbian Cyrillic: Златко Лишчевић; born 8 March 1991) is a Serbian footballer.

== Personal life ==
He is a younger brother of Kristina Liščević.
