= Filip Babić =

Serbian footballer

Personal information
- Full name: Филип Бабић
- Date of birth: 27 May 1995 (age 31)
- Place of birth: Užice, FR Yugoslavia
- Height: 1.87 m (6 ft 2 in)
- Position: Centre-back

Team information
- Current team: Jedinstvo Užice

Youth career
- Sloboda Užice

Senior career*
Years	Team	Apps	(Gls)
2014–2016	Sloboda Užice	49	(2)
2016	Proleter Novi Sad	12	(0)
2017	Vojvodina	2	(0)
2018–2021	TSC	86	(6)
2022	Loznica	10	(0)
2022–2023	Mladost Lučani	14	(0)
2024-	Jedinstvo Užice		
- * Club domestic league appearances and goals as of 31 July 2023

Filip Babić (Serbian Cyrillic: Филип Бабић; born 25 May 1995) is a Serbian professional footballer who plays as a defender.

== Career statistics ==
As of 26 August 2017

Club	Season	League		Cup		Continental		Total	
Club	Season	Apps	Goals	Apps	Goals	Apps	Goals	Apps	Goals
Sloboda Užice	2014–15	25	2	2	0	0	0	27	2
Sloboda Užice	2015–16	24	0	1	0	0	0	25	0
Sloboda Užice	Total	49	2	3	0	0	0	52	2
Proleter Novi Sad	2016–17	12	0	0	0	0	0	12	0
Proleter Novi Sad	Total	12	0	0	0	0	0	12	0
Vojvodina	2016–17	1	0	0	0	0	0	1	0
Vojvodina	2017–18	1	0	0	0	0	0	1	0
Vojvodina	Total	2	0	0	0	0	0	2	0
Career total		63	2	3	0	0	0	66	2
