= Stefan Todorović (footballer) =

Serbian footballer (born 1997)

Personal information
- Date of birth: 26 August 1997 (age 29)
- Height: 1.81 m (5 ft 11 in)
- Position: Right-back

Team information
- Current team: Calcio Leinfelden-Echterdingen
- Number: 24

Youth career
- Napredak Kruševac

Senior career*
Years	Team	Apps	(Gls)
2015–2016	Napredak Kruševac	4	(1)
2017–2018	Temnić 1924	3	(0)
2018–2020	Zlatibor Čajetina	36	(1)
2020–2022	Napredak Kruševac	7	(0)
2024	TV Echterdingen	13	(2)
2024–	Calcio Leinfelden-Echterdingen	20	(0)
- * Club domestic league appearances and goals as of 12 September 2025

Stefan Todorović (Serbian Cyrillic: Стефан Тодоровић; born 26 August 1997) is a Serbian football defender for German side Calcio Leinfelden-Echterdingen.

== Career ==
Todorović joined German side TV Echterdingen in January 2024.

== Honours ==
FK Napredak Kruševac

- Serbian First League: 2015–16

FK Zlatibor Čajetina

- Serbian First League: 2019-20
