= Filip Stanković (footballer, born 1997) =

Serbian footballer

Personal information
- Full name: Filip Stanković
- Date of birth: 3 January 1997 (age 29)
- Place of birth: Belgrade, FR Yugoslavia
- Height: 1.87 m (6 ft 2 in)
- Positions: Centre-back; right-back

Team information
- Current team: OFK Brzi Brod

Youth career
- Red Star Belgrade

Senior career*
Years	Team	Apps	(Gls)
2016–2017	Red Star Belgrade	0	(0)
2016	→ OFK Beograd (loan)	4	(0)
2017–2019	Radnički Niš	1	(0)
2018–2019	→ Car Konstantin (loan)	0	(0)
2020-2021	Car Konstantin		
2021-	OFK Brzi Brod		

International career^{‡}
2012–2013	Serbia U16	7	(0)
2013–2014	Serbia U17	9	(0)
2014–2015	Serbia U18	11	(0)
2015–2016	Serbia U19	11	(1)
- * Club domestic league appearances and goals as of 21 July 2018 ‡ National team caps and goals as of 13 January 2017

Filip Stanković (Serbian Cyrillic: Филип Станковић; born 3 January 1997) is a Serbian footballer, who plays as a defender for OFK Brzi Brod.

== Club career ==
After he spent his youth career with Red Star Belgrade, Stanković moved to OFK Beograd on one-year loan in summer 2016. After the end of first half-season in which he made 4 appearances for OFK Beograd, a loan deal was terminated and he returned to his home club. After the end of contract with the club, Stanković left Red Star as a free agent in summer 2017.

Shortly after he left his former club, Stanković signed a five-year deal with Radnički Niš in last days of July 2017.

== International career ==
Stanković was called into national team levels since 2013, when he was elected into the Serbia under-16 national team squad. Later he was a member of Serbia U17, and standard player of Serbia U18 & Serbia U19 teams.

== Career statistics ==
=== Club ===
As of 17 May 2018

Appearances and goals by club, season and competition
Club	Season	League			Cup		Continental		Other		Total	
Club	Season	Division	Apps	Goals	Apps	Goals	Apps	Goals	Apps	Goals	Apps	Goals
Red Star Belgrade	2015–16	SuperLiga	0	0	0	0	0	0	—		0	0
Red Star Belgrade	2016–17	SuperLiga	0	0	0	0	0	0	—		0	0
OFK Beograd (loan)	2016–17	First League	4	0	0	0	—		—		4	0
Radnički Niš	2017–18	SuperLiga	1	0	0	0	—		—		1	0
Dinamo Vranje (loan)	2018–19	SuperLiga	0	0	0	0	—		—		0	0
Career total			5	0	0	0	0	0	—		5	0
