= List of Serbian football transfers summer 2019 =

- This is a list of transfers in Serbian football for the 2019–20 summer transfer window.
- Moves featuring Serbian SuperLiga and Serbian First League sides are listed.
- The order by which the clubs are listed is equal to the classifications at the end of the 2018–19 season.

== Serbian SuperLiga ==
=== Red Star Belgrade ===
In: Note: Flags indicate national team as defined under FIFA eligibility rules; some limited exceptions apply. Players may hold more than one non-FIFA nationality.

No.	Pos.	Nation	Player
6	DF	SRB	Radovan Pankov (from Radnički Niš)
99	FW	MNE	Nikola Krstović (loan return from (Montenegro) Zeta)
27	GK	SRB	Nikola Vasiljević (from Radnik Surdulica)
87	MF	ESP	José Cañas (from (Greece) PAOK)
17	FW	POR	Tomané (from (Portugal) Tondela)
18	DF	BRA	Jander (from (Cyprus) Pafos)
32	GK	SRB	Aleksandar Stanković (loan return from Grafičar Beograd)
5	DF	AUS	Miloš Degenek (was on loan, now signed from (Saudi Arabia) Al-Hilal)
20	MF	SRB	Njegoš Petrović (from Rad)
22	MF	SRB	Veljko Nikolić (loan return from Grafičar Beograd)
11	FW	ARG	Mateo García (from (Spain) Las Palmas)
91	FW	NED	Rajiv van La Parra (from (England) Huddersfield Town)

Out: Note: Flags indicate national team as defined under FIFA eligibility rules; some limited exceptions apply. Players may hold more than one non-FIFA nationality.

No.	Pos.	Nation	Player
10	MF	SRB	Nenad Milijaš (retired)
27	GK	BIH	Nemanja Supić (retired)
—	DF	SRB	Aleksa Terzić (to (Italy) Fiorentina, was on loan at Grafičar Beograd)
—	GK	SRB	Luka Krstović (to TSC)
28	FW	SRB	Dejan Joveljić (to (Germany) Eintracht Frankfurt)
—	FW	SRB	Njegoš Kupusović (on loan to (Germany) Erzgebirge Aue)
—	MF	SRB	Stefan Fićović (on loan to Grafičar Beograd, previously brought from Borac Čačak)
—	MF	GAM	Ousman Marong (on loan to Grafičar Beograd, previously brought from the Trayal Kruševac)
22	FW	BRA	Jonathan Cafu (loan return to (France) Bordeaux)
36	MF	SVK	Erik Jirka (on loan to Radnički Niš)
8	MF	SRB	Dejan Meleg (on loan to Radnički Niš, was on loan at (Greece) Levadiakos)
20	MF	SRB	Goran Čaušić (to (Russia) Arsenal Tula)
—	MF	SRB	Stefan Cvetković (to Čukarički, was on loan at Grafičar Beograd)
—	DF	SRB	Damjan Daničić (to Voždovac, was on loan at Grafičar Beograd)
90	DF	SRB	Vujadin Savić (to (Cyprus) APOEL)
37	DF	GHA	Rashid Sumaila (loan return to (Kuwait) Qadsia)
44	DF	BRA	Zé Marcos (to (Brazil) Avaí, was on loan at (Montenegro) OFK Grbalj)
—	FW	GHA	Ibrahim Tanko (to Mladost Lučani, was on loan at Bežanija)
34	DF	SRB	Stefan Hajdin (on loan to Voždovac)
11	MF	NED	Lorenzo Ebecilio (to (Japan) Jubilo Iwata)
73	FW	SRB	Jug Stanojev (loan extension to Grafičar Beograd)
—	DF	SRB	Marko Konatar (loan extension to Grafičar Beograd)
—	MF	SRB	Željko Gavrić (loan extension to Grafičar Beograd)
—	FW	SRB	Dejan Vidić (on loan to Grafičar Beograd, was on loan at Zemun)
—	GK	SRB	Strahinja Savić (loan extension to Grafičar Beograd)
—	DF	SRB	Nemanja Stojić (loan extension to Grafičar Beograd)
—	MF	BIH	Stefan Santrač (loan extension to Grafičar Beograd)
—	MF	SRB	Miloš Nikolić (loan extension to Grafičar Beograd)
—	MF	SRB	Mateja Stojanović (on loan to Bačka BP)
—	MF	SRB	Nenad Adžibaba (on loan to Zemun)
—	FW	MKD	Strahinja Krstevski (on loan to (North Macedonia) Rabotnički, was on loan at Grafičar Beograd)
—	FW	SRB	Mihajlo Baić (to Spartak Subotica)
—	MF	SRB	Bogdan Jočić (to (Italy) Verona)
30	DF	MNE	Filip Stojković (to (Austria) Rapid Wien)

=== Radnički Niš ===
In: Note: Flags indicate national team as defined under FIFA eligibility rules; some limited exceptions apply. Players may hold more than one non-FIFA nationality.

No.	Pos.	Nation	Player
70	MF	MNE	Veljko Batrović (from (Bulgaria) Etar Veliko Tarnovo)
89	GK	SRB	Marko Knežević (from Voždovac)
45	GK	SRB	Nikola Petrović (from Napredak Kruševac)
6	DF	SRB	Ivan Ostojić (from (Czech Republic) Dukla Prague)
12	DF	SRB	Lazar Đorđević (from (Czech Republic) MFK Karviná)
33	MF	SVK	Erik Jirka (on loan from Red Star Belgrade)
23	MF	SRB	Dejan Meleg (on loan from Red Star Belgrade)
19	FW	SRB	Vladimir Đilas (from Jedinstvo Surčin)
29	FW	SRB	Stefan Mihajlović (from Rad)
2	DF	BIH	Nemanja Nikolić (on loan from (Greece) Olympiacos)
18	MF	SRB	Uroš Miloradović (from Brodarac)
24	DF	IRQ	Rebin Sulaka (from (Qatar) Al-Shahania)
35	MF	SRB	Dušan Pantelić (from (Greece) PAS Giannina)

Out: Note: Flags indicate national team as defined under FIFA eligibility rules; some limited exceptions apply. Players may hold more than one non-FIFA nationality.

No.	Pos.	Nation	Player
18	MF	MNE	Petar Grbić (to (Montenegro) Budućnost Podgorica)
19	GK	SRB	Borivoje Ristić (to (Greece) AEL)
20	MF	MNE	Nikola Drinčić (to Vojvodina)
22	MF	MNE	Damir Kojašević (to (Montenegro) Sutjeska Nikšić)
77	MF	SRB	Lazar Ranđelović (loan return to (Greece) Olympiacos)
4	DF	SRB	Radovan Pankov (to Red Star Belgrade)
33	DF	SRB	Nikola Stanković (to (Greece) AEL)
47	MF	AUT	Aleksandar Kostić (to (Austria) Blau-Weiß Linz)
15	DF	SRB	Đorđe Crnomarković (to (Poland) Lech Poznań)
2	DF	SRB	Marko Živković (to Voždovac)
80	MF	MKD	Petar Krstić (released)
90	FW	SRB	Slađan Nikodijević (to Radnički 1923)
24	MF	SRB	Aleksandar Jovanović (to Kolubara)
11	MF	SWE	Petar Petrović (to (Sweden) Västerås)
9	MF	SRB	Milan Makarić (to Radnik Surdulica, previously brought from Bačka BP)
4	MF	SRB	Luka Čermelj (to Inđija, previously brought from Teleoptik)
88	FW	SRB	Milan Bojović (to Mladost Lučani, previously brought from same club)
77	MF	SRB	Nemanja Tomić (to Radnik Surdulica, previously brought from Zemun)
27	DF	SRB	Petar Ćirković (loan extension to Radnički Pirot)

=== Partizan ===
In: Note: Flags indicate national team as defined under FIFA eligibility rules; some limited exceptions apply. Players may hold more than one non-FIFA nationality.

No.	Pos.	Nation	Player
20	MF	GUI	Seydouba Soumah (loan return from (Israel) Maccabi Haifa)
85	GK	SRB	Nemanja Stevanović (loan return from Čukarički)
90	FW	SRB	Strahinja Jovanović (loan return from Teleoptik)
27	FW	SRB	Nikola Lakčević (loan return from Teleoptik)
5	DF	MNE	Igor Vujačić (from (Montenegro) Zeta)
2	DF	MNE	Periša Pešukić (from (Montenegro) Budućnost Podgorica)
67	DF	SRB	Dominik Dinga (on loan from (Russia) Ural Yekaterinburg)
97	FW	SRB	Aleksandar Lutovac (from Rad)
9	FW	NGR	Umar Sadiq (on loan from (Italy) Roma)
31	DF	SRB	Rajko Brežančić (from (Spain) Málaga)
45	FW	SRB	Petar Gigić (from Mačva Šabac)
—	GK	BIH	Luka Kačavenda (from Vojvodina, to youth team)
11	FW	JPN	Takuma Asano (from (England) Arsenal)
6	MF	ISR	Bibras Natkho (from (Greece) Olympiacos)
50	FW	SRB	Lazar Marković (from (England) Fulham)

Out: Note: Flags indicate national team as defined under FIFA eligibility rules; some limited exceptions apply. Players may hold more than one non-FIFA nationality.

No.	Pos.	Nation	Player
22	MF	SRB	Saša Ilić (retired)
—	MF	SRB	Filip Čermelj (to Mačva Šabac, was on loan at Teleoptik)
61	GK	SRB	Marko Jovičić (loan extension to (Malta) Hibernians)
—	FW	SRB	Stefan Ilić (to Mačva Šabac, was on loan at Teleoptik)
—	DF	SRB	Bojan Balaž (to TSC)
—	DF	SRB	Luka Cucin (loan extension to Spartak Subotica)
—	DF	SRB	Jovan Vlalukin (to Metalac G. M., was on loan at Teleoptik)
30	MF	SRB	Veljko Birmančević (was on loan, now signed for Čukarički)
—	GK	SRB	Nikola Stepanović (to (Greece) Xanthi)
—	DF	SRB	Nikša Stanojević (on loan to Teleoptik, previously brought from Voždovac)
—	MF	SRB	Jovan Kokir (to Vojvodina, was on loan at Teleoptik)
14	FW	SRB	Dejan Georgijević (loan return to (Hungary) Ferencváros)
—	FW	SRB	Nikola Nović (to Metalac G. M., was on loan at Teleoptik)
—	DF	BIH	Aleksandar Subić (to (Bosnia and Herzegovina) Borac Banja Luka)
—	MF	UKR	Yuriy Vakulko (to (Ukraine) Dnipro-1, was on loan at (Ukraine) Arsenal Kyiv)
15	DF	SRB	Svetozar Marković (to (Greece) Olympiacos)
—	DF	SRB	Mihailo Ilić (to (Bosnia and Herzegovina) Radnik Bijeljina)
—	DF	SRB	Lazar Vujanić (to (Croatia) Sesvete, was on loan at Teleoptik)
—	MF	SRB	Strahinja Karišić (to Voždovac, was on loan at Teleoptik)
—	FW	SRB	Matija Babović (to Dinamo Vranje, was on loan at Teleoptik)
6	DF	ESP	Marc Valiente (to (Spain) Sporting de Gijón)
11	FW	CPV	Ricardo Gomes (to (United Arab Emirates) Sharjah)
—	MF	MNE	Ognjen Peličić (to (Montenegro) Iskra Danilovgrad, was on loan at Teleoptik)
21	MF	NOR	Moussa Njie (on loan to (Norway) Odd)
—	GK	SRB	Jovan Trnić (to Radnički Sremska Mitrovica, was on loan to Teleoptik)
8	MF	SRB	Armin Đerlek (to (Turkey) Sivasspor)
45	FW	SRB	Radivoj Bosić (to (Switzerland) Wil)
9	FW	SRB	Nemanja Nikolić (on loan to Vojvodina)
—	FW	BIH	Sergej Vintonji (released)
14	MF	SRB	Ivan Milosavljević (on loan to Teleoptik)
—	DF	BIH	Nemanja Vještica (to Bačka BP)
55	MF	SRB	Danilo Pantić (loan return to Chelsea)
51	FW	SRB	Ognjen Ožegović (to (Germany) Darmstadt 98, was on loan at (Russia) Arsenal Tula)
77	MF	BIH	Goran Zakarić (to (Romania) Universitatea Craiova)
26	DF	SRB	Nemanja Miletić (to (Poland) Korona Kielce)
44	DF	ROU	Gabriel Enache (to (Romania) Astra Giurgiu, was on loan at (Romania) Dunărea Călărași)

=== Čukarički ===
In: Note: Flags indicate national team as defined under FIFA eligibility rules; some limited exceptions apply. Players may hold more than one non-FIFA nationality.

No.	Pos.	Nation	Player
86	MF	SRB	Veljko Birmančević (was on loan, now signed from Partizan)
30	MF	SRB	Nikola Ćirković (from Voždovac)
17	MF	SRB	Stefan Cvetković (from Red Star Belgrade)
7	FW	NED	Mink Peeters (from (Spain) Real Madrid B)
40	DF	SRB	Miloš Ostojić (from Napredak Kruševac)
15	FW	SEN	Ibrahima Mame N'Diaye (from Napredak Kruševac)
18	FW	SRB	Petar Mićin (on loan from (Italy) Udinese)
—	FW	GHA	Vilson Kwame Owusu (from (Ghana) Vision)
88	MF	SRB	Viktor Lukić (from Brodarac)

Out: Note: Flags indicate national team as defined under FIFA eligibility rules; some limited exceptions apply. Players may hold more than one non-FIFA nationality.

No.	Pos.	Nation	Player
42	GK	SRB	Nemanja Stevanović (loan return to Partizan)
—	FW	SRB	Predrag Radić (to Metalac G.M., was on loan at IMT)
26	DF	SRB	Đorđe Đurić (to Vojvodina)
7	FW	SRB	Ognjen Mudrinski (to (Poland) Jagiellonia Białystok)
2	DF	SRB	Sava Radić (to Trayal Kruševac, was on loan at Bečej)
15	DF	MNE	Boris Kopitović (to (Belarus) BATE Borisov)
12	DF	SRB	Vasilije Bakić (to Voždovac)
89	DF	SRB	Slobodan Rubežić (to Novi Pazar)
15	MF	GHA	Samuel Owusu (to (Saudi Arabia) Al-Fayha)
—	DF	SRB	Andrija Radovanović (to (United Arab Emirates) Al Ain)
28	MF	BIH	Nenad Kiso (was on loan, now signed with Zemun)

=== Mladost Lučani ===
In: Note: Flags indicate national team as defined under FIFA eligibility rules; some limited exceptions apply. Players may hold more than one non-FIFA nationality.

No.	Pos.	Nation	Player
8	MF	SRB	Ivan Obrovac (from Mačva Šabac)
44	DF	SRB	Bogdan Milošević (from (France) Laval)
88	MF	SRB	Filip Stojanović (from Radnik Surdulica)
9	FW	GHA	Zakaria Suraka (from Dinamo Vranje)
20	MF	SRB	Danilo Sekulić (from (Hungary) Debrecen)
14	FW	GHA	Ibrahim Tanko (from Red Star Belgrade)
3	MF	SRB	Stefan Jaraković (from LFK Mladost Lučani)
18	FW	SRB	Milan Bojović (from Radnički Niš, previously sold to same club)
23	GK	MNE	Maksim Milović (from (Spain) San Fernando)

Out: Note: Flags indicate national team as defined under FIFA eligibility rules; some limited exceptions apply. Players may hold more than one non-FIFA nationality.

No.	Pos.	Nation	Player
3	DF	SRB	Marko Jevremović (to Javor Ivanjica)
31	MF	MNE	Janko Tumbasević (to TSC)
7	DF	SRB	Stefan Dimić (to (Malta) Balzan)
5	MF	SRB	Jovan Markoski (to Napredak Kruševac)
10	MF	SRB	Petar Bojić (to Vojvodina)
15	MF	SRB	Aleksandar Pejović (to (Belarus) Dinamo Minsk)
44	DF	SRB	Petar Jovanović (to Zlatibor Čajetina)
—	MF	SRB	Danko Kiković (was on loan, now signed for OFK Žarkovo)
23	GK	SRB	Dragan Rosić (to (Spain) Almería)
—	FW	SRB	Despot Obrenović (to Bačka BP, was on loan at Sloga Požega)

=== Napredak Kruševac ===
In: Note: Flags indicate national team as defined under FIFA eligibility rules; some limited exceptions apply. Players may hold more than one non-FIFA nationality.

No.	Pos.	Nation	Player
7	MF	SRB	Jovan Markoski (from Mladost Lučani)
33	DF	SRB	Tomislav Pajović (from Radnik Surdulica)
20	FW	SRB	Đuro Zec (from (Bosnia and Herzegovina) Krupa)
3	DF	SRB	Miloš Milovanović (from Radnik Surdulica)
5	MF	SRB	Miloš Ožegović (from Dinamo Vranje)
23	MF	SRB	Milan Spremo (from Bačka BP)
34	GK	SRB	Marko Milošević (from Zemun)
49	MF	SRB	Aleksandar Mesarović (from Vojvodina)
77	FW	SRB	Marko Pavićević (from (Montenegro) OFK Titograd)
88	MF	SRB	Aleksandar Desančić (from Bežanija)
95	DF	MNE	Mitar Ćuković (from Proleter Novi Sad)
15	MF	SRB	Miroslav Bjeloš (from Bačka BP)
12	FW	SRB	Nenad Gavrić (from Mačva Šabac)
36	FW	SRB	Nemanja Kojić (from (Japan) Tokyo Verdy)

Out: Note: Flags indicate national team as defined under FIFA eligibility rules; some limited exceptions apply. Players may hold more than one non-FIFA nationality.

No.	Pos.	Nation	Player
23	DF	SRB	Stefan Deak (to (Hungary) MTK Budapest)
45	GK	SRB	Nikola Petrović (to Radnički Niš)
5	DF	SRB	Marko Marinković (to (Slovakia) Spartak Trnava)
—	MF	GHA	Baba Musah (to Trayal Kruševac)
40	DF	SRB	Miloš Ostojić (to Čukarički)
14	MF	SRB	Krsta Bojić (loan return to Bežanija)
11	FW	SEN	Ibrahima Mame N'Diaye (to Čukarički)
9	FW	SRB	Anes Rušević (to Proleter Novi Sad)
8	FW	SRB	Enver Alivodić (to Novi Pazar)
41	DF	SRB	Nemanja Petrović (to Rad)
21	MF	SRB	Filip Jović (to Novi Pazar, previously bought from Teleoptik)

=== Vojvodina ===
In: Note: Flags indicate national team as defined under FIFA eligibility rules; some limited exceptions apply. Players may hold more than one non-FIFA nationality.

No.	Pos.	Nation	Player
—	DF	SRB	Đorđe Knežević (loan return from Kabel)
18	MF	MNE	Nikola Drinčić (from Radnički Niš)
10	MF	SRB	Jovan Kokir (from Partizan)
11	DF	SRB	Nemanja Vučić (from Zemun)
4	MF	SRB	Marko Đurišić (from Dinamo Vranje)
24	MF	SRB	Petar Bojić (from Mladost Lučani)
20	DF	SRB	Đorđe Đurić (from Čukarički)
15	DF	SRB	Nikola Vasiljević (free, last with (Belarus) BATE Borisov)
28	FW	SRB	Miodrag Gemović (from Mačva Šabac)
7	FW	SRB	Nemanja Čović (from Proleter Novi Sad)
55	MF	SLO	Željko Filipović (from (Kazakhstan) Atyrau)
22	FW	SRB	Nemanja Nikolić (on loan from Partizan)
13	DF	SRB	Nikola Petković (from (China) Sichuan Longfor)

Out: Note: Flags indicate national team as defined under FIFA eligibility rules; some limited exceptions apply. Players may hold more than one non-FIFA nationality.

No.	Pos.	Nation	Player
15	DF	BIH	Daniel Graovac (to (Romania) Astra Giurgiu)
26	MF	SRB	Nikola Srećković (to Spartak Subotica)
21	MF	BIH	Damir Zlomislić (to (Bosnia and Herzegovina) Zrinjski Mostar)
44	DF	SRB	Danilo Mitrović (to (Austria) Blau-Weiß Linz)
37	FW	SRB	Dragoljub Savić (to (Austria) Rapid Wien II)
29	MF	BIH	Dobrica Tegeltija (to (Austria) First Vienna)
17	MF	SRB	Aleksandar Mesarović (to Napredak Kruševac)
—	MF	BIH	Predrag Vladić (loan extension to Kabel)
—	FW	BIH	Đorđe Pantelić (loan extension to Kabel)
—	DF	SRB	Marko Mandić (on loan to Kabel, was on loan at Bečej)
39	DF	SRB	Marko Bjeković (on loan to Kabel)
13	MF	SRB	Damjan Gojkov (to Spartak Subotica)
22	MF	GRE	Nemanja Milojević (to (Greece) Panionios)
42	FW	SRB	Milan Vidakov (on loan to OFK Vršac)
—	MF	SRB	Aleksandar Mirkov (to Smederevo 1924, was on loan at Bečej)
—	GK	BIH	Luka Kačavenda (to Partizan)
—	DF	BIH	Nenad Lalić (to (Bosnia and Herzegovina) Alfa Modriča)
98	FW	SRB	Nikola Gajić (to (Spain) Extremadura B)
7	MF	SRB	Milan Đurić (to (Australia) Central Coast Mariners)
6	MF	SRB	Nemanja Ahčin (to Dinamo Pančevo)
11	MF	SRB	Kristijan Živković (to Mladi Radnik)
—	FW	BIH	Miloš Milijašević (to (Slovenia) Adria Miren)
31	MF	SRB	Vuk Mitošević (to Radnik Surdulica)
—	GK	SRB	Vukašin Pilipović (loan extension to Kabel)

=== Proleter Novi Sad ===
In: Note: Flags indicate national team as defined under FIFA eligibility rules; some limited exceptions apply. Players may hold more than one non-FIFA nationality.

No.	Pos.	Nation	Player
9	FW	SRB	Milan Mirosavljev (from (Kazakhstan) Irtysh Pavlodar)
4	DF	BLR	Ilya Lukashevich (from (Belarus) Torpedo-BelAZ Zhodino)
91	GK	SRB	Nikola Petrić (from (Greece) Panachaiki)
17	MF	SRB	Uglješa Radinović (from Bačka BP)
8	MF	SRB	Milorad Balabanović (from Rad)
90	GK	SRB	Ivan Knežević (from Cement Beočin)
66	DF	SRB	Stefan Jovanović (from Bačka BP)
21	MF	SRB	Marko Pantić (from Bačka BP)
32	MF	SRB	Uros Lukić (from Brodarac)
6	MF	SRB	Aleksa Pejić (from Brodarac)
12	MF	SRB	Lazar Marjanović (from (Bosnia and Herzegovina) Krupa)
44	DF	SRB	Bojan Kovačević (from Voždovac)
26	DF	SRB	Aleksandar Tanasin (from Radnik Surdulica)
99	FW	SRB	Anes Rušević (from Napredak Kruševac)
20	MF	SRB	Branislav Jovanović (from Rad)
30	FW	SRB	Siniša Babić (from (Bosnia and Herzegovina) Krupa)

Out: Note: Flags indicate national team as defined under FIFA eligibility rules; some limited exceptions apply. Players may hold more than one non-FIFA nationality.

No.	Pos.	Nation	Player
7	FW	SRB	Nemanja Čović (to Vojvodina)
5	DF	SRB	Zarija Lambulić (to (Belarus) Shakhtyor Soligorsk)
69	FW	SRB	Srđan Vujaklija (to (Bosnia and Herzegovina) Borac Banja Luka)
14	DF	MNE	Mitar Ćuković (to Napredak Kruševac)
5	DF	SRB	Mihajlo Ivančević (to Spartak Subotica, previously bought from Brodarac)
70	MF	SRB	Predrag Govedarica (to Grafičar Beograd)
20	MF	GHA	Joseph Bempah (to Radnički Pirot)
7	MF	ARM	Artur Yedigaryan (to (Armenia) Alashkert, previously bought from the same club)
14	FW	SRB	Mladen Lukić (to Žarkovo, previously bought from the same club)
20	MF	SRB	Nikola Ilić (to Žarkovo)
69	FW	SRB	Andrija Ratković (to Kolubara, previously bought from (Czech Republic) Písek)
77	DF	SRB	Stefan Golubović (to Žarkovo, previously bought from Brodarac)
31	FW	SRB	Uroš Stamenić (to Zlatibor Čajetina)
—	MF	SRB	Saša Filipović (to Zemun)

=== Radnik Surdulica ===
In: Note: Flags indicate national team as defined under FIFA eligibility rules; some limited exceptions apply. Players may hold more than one non-FIFA nationality.

No.	Pos.	Nation	Player
12	GK	SRB	Ivan Kostić (from Metalac G.M.)
28	FW	SRB	Luka Mićić (from Bačka BP)
24	DF	SRB	Uroš Stojanović (from Bežanija)
9	MF	SRB	Milan Makarić (from Radnički Niš)
2	MF	SRB	Miroljub Kostić (from (Uzbekistan) AGMK)
7	FW	MKD	Boban Georgiev (from (North Macedonia) Sileks)
6	DF	SRB	Nenad Stanković (from Sinđelić Beograd)
19	MF	SRB	Ognjen Dimitrić (from IMT)
3	DF	SRB	Ranko Jokić (from Bačka 1901)
29	MF	SRB	Vuk Mitošević (from Vojvodina)
33	DF	SRB	Aleksandar Stanisavljević (from (Bulgaria) Slavia Sofia)
4	DF	SRB	Žarko Marković (from (Kazakhstan) Kairat)
77	MF	SRB	Nemanja Tomić (from Radnički Niš)
91	FW	UKR	Yevhen Pavlov (from (Cyprus) Doxa Katokopias)
—	GK	SRB	Nikola Vujanac (from (North Macedonia) Belasica)

Out: Note: Flags indicate national team as defined under FIFA eligibility rules; some limited exceptions apply. Players may hold more than one non-FIFA nationality.

No.	Pos.	Nation	Player
9	FW	MNE	Stefan Nikolić (to (Montenegro) Sutjeska Nikšić)
4	DF	SRB	Tomislav Pajović (to Napredak Kruševac)
1	GK	SRB	Nikola Vasiljević (to Red Star Belgrade)
28	MF	SRB	Nikola Kovačević (to Mačva Šabac)
8	MF	SRB	Filip Stojanović (to Mladost Lučani)
3	DF	SRB	Miloš Milovanović (to Napredak Kruševac)
22	GK	SRB	Milovan Lekić (to Mačva Šabac)
27	FW	SRB	Igor Zlatanović (to (Spain) Mallorca)
26	MF	SRB	Sead Islamović (to Novi Pazar, previously bought from same club)
—	DF	SRB	Aleksandar Tanasin (to Proleter Novi Sad)

=== Spartak Subotica ===
In: Note: Flags indicate national team as defined under FIFA eligibility rules; some limited exceptions apply. Players may hold more than one non-FIFA nationality.

No.	Pos.	Nation	Player
22	DF	SRB	Luka Cucin (loan extension from Partizan)
7	MF	SRB	Nikola Srećković (from Vojvodina)
14	MF	SRB	Vladan Vidaković (from Hajduk Kula)
40	FW	JPN	Sho Yamamoto (from (Montenegro) Petrovac)
19	MF	SRB	Damjan Gojkov (from Vojvodina)
5	DF	SRB	Mihajlo Ivančević (from Proleter Novi Sad)
30	DF	SRB	Aleksa Urošević (from Borac Čačak)
20	MF	POR	Andrezinho (from (Portugal) Estoril)
28	FW	SRB	Mihajlo Baić (from Red Star Belgrade)
55	DF	SRB	Mihailo Milutinović (from Zemun)

Out: Note: Flags indicate national team as defined under FIFA eligibility rules; some limited exceptions apply. Players may hold more than one non-FIFA nationality.

No.	Pos.	Nation	Player
8	MF	SRB	Vladimir Torbica (retired)
28	MF	NGR	Bassey Inyang Howells (released)
5	DF	SRB	Dejan Kerkez (to (Portugal) Marítimo)
15	MF	SRB	Nemanja Glavčić (to (Croatia) Slaven Belupo)
9	FW	SRB	Dejan Đenić (to Kolubara)
21	DF	MNE	Andrija Vukčević (to (Belgium) Waasland-Beveren)
14	MF	SRB	Đorđe Radovanović (to Trayal Kruševac)
96	GK	SRB	Ivan Lučić (to Smederevo 1924)
27	DF	SRB	Slađan Rakić (to Smederevo 1924)
—	DF	SRB	Filip Milićević (to Sinđelić Beograd, was on loan at Zvezdara)
13	DF	SRB	Draško Đorđević (from Sinđelić Beograd)

=== Voždovac ===
In: Note: Flags indicate national team as defined under FIFA eligibility rules; some limited exceptions apply. Players may hold more than one non-FIFA nationality.

No.	Pos.	Nation	Player
—	DF	SRB	Filip Damjanović (loan return from IMT)
5	DF	SRB	Nenad Cvetković (from Zemun)
1	GK	SRB	Marko Trkulja (from Sinđelić Beograd)
26	FW	SRB	Viktor Živojinović (from Jedinstvo Ub)
25	MF	MNE	Nemanja Nikolić (from (Belarus) Minsk)
22	DF	SRB	Marko Živković (from Radnički Niš)
14	MF	LTU	Justas Lasickas (from (Poland) Jagiellonia Białystok)
9	MF	MNE	Miloš Stojčev (from (Bosnia and Herzegovina) Tuzla City)
15	DF	SRB	Damjan Daničić (from Red Star Belgrade)
8	MF	SRB	Strahinja Karišić (from Partizan)
30	MF	SRB	Ognjen Krasić (from (Armenia) Banants)
44	DF	SRB	Stefan Hajdin (on loan from Red Star Belgrade)
35	FW	MKD	Marko Gjorgjievski (from (North Macedonia) Borec)
27	DF	SRB	Vasilije Bakić (from Čukarički)
3	DF	SRB	Nemanja Lakić-Pešić (from (India) Kerala Blasters)
18	FW	UKR	Marko Dević (from (Azerbaijan) Sabah)
17	FW	SRB	Aleksandar Stanisavljević (from (Israel) Bnei Sakhnin)

Out: Note: Flags indicate national team as defined under FIFA eligibility rules; some limited exceptions apply. Players may hold more than one non-FIFA nationality.

No.	Pos.	Nation	Player
18	FW	SRB	Filip Stuparević (loan return to (England) Watford)
42	MF	SRB	Dragoljub Srnić (to (Poland) ŁKS Łódź)
20	MF	SRB	Andrija Luković (to (Poland) Raków Częstochowa)
25	MF	SRB	Miloš Pavlović (Zemun)
27	DF	SRB	Marko Jovanović (to (Bosnia and Herzegovina) Borac Banja Luka)
—	GK	GER	Luka Lošić (to (Germany) Kickers Offenbach)
11	MF	SRB	Lazar Arsić (to (China) Meizhou Hakka)
22	GK	SRB	Marko Knežević (to Radnički Niš)
81	DF	SRB	Dušan Matović (released)
8	FW	SRB	Predrag Sikimić (to (Slovenia) Tabor Sežana)
30	MF	SRB	Nikola Ćirković (to Čukarički)
—	DF	SRB	Nikša Stanojević (to Partizan)
—	DF	SRB	Božidar Veličković (to (Sweden) Trelleborg, was on loan at Inđija)
12	FW	SRB	Nikola Trujić (to (Hungary) Debrecen)
7	FW	SRB	Borko Duronjić (to TSC)
—	MF	SRB	Jovica Blagojević (to (Montenegro) Kom, was on loan at Sinđelić Beograd)
—	MF	SRB	Radovan Avram (to Budućnost Dobanovci, was on loan at Bežanija)
17	DF	SRB	Bojan Kovačević (to Proleter Novi Sad)
2	MF	SRB	Miloš Bosančić (to Rad, previously bought from (Azerbaijan) Sabah)
17	DF	SRB	Miloš Stojanović (to Budućnost Dobanovci)
—	MF	SRB	Igor Maksimović (to Metalac G. M., was on loan at Inđija)

=== Mačva Šabac ===
In: Note: Flags indicate national team as defined under FIFA eligibility rules; some limited exceptions apply. Players may hold more than one non-FIFA nationality.

No.	Pos.	Nation	Player
78	MF	SRB	Filip Čermelj (from Partizan)
17	FW	SRB	Stefan Ilić (from Partizan)
16	DF	SRB	Nikola Đukić (from (Italy) Chievo)
10	MF	SRB	Mile Vujasin (from Radnički 1923)
28	MF	SRB	Nikola Kovačević (from Radnik Surdulica)
1	GK	SRB	Milovan Lekić (from Radnik Surdulica)
22	FW	SRB	Marko Jeremić (from Bežanija)
9	FW	SRB	Nikola Ašćerić (from (Sweden) GAIS)
50	FW	SRB	Nenad Marinković (from (Russia) Tyumen)

Out: Note: Flags indicate national team as defined under FIFA eligibility rules; some limited exceptions apply. Players may hold more than one non-FIFA nationality.

No.	Pos.	Nation	Player
8	MF	SRB	Ivan Obrovac (to Mladost Lučani)
33	FW	SRB	Miodrag Gemović (to Vojvodina)
9	FW	SRB	Petar Gigić (to Partizan)
—	MF	SRB	Matija Miketić (to Novi Pazar, was on loan at IMT)
12	FW	SRB	Nenad Gavrić (to Napredak Kruševac)
—	MF	SRB	Dejan Babić (to Žarkovo)

=== Rad ===
In: Note: Flags indicate national team as defined under FIFA eligibility rules; some limited exceptions apply. Players may hold more than one non-FIFA nationality.

No.	Pos.	Nation	Player
16	DF	SRB	Milan Jagodić (from Budućnost Dobanovci)
2	DF	SRB	Marko Nikolić (free, last with (Ukraine) Arsenal Kyiv)
28	MF	SRB	Branko Riznić (from Zvezdara)
11	FW	UKR	Yevhen Kovalenko (from Žarkovo)
23	MF	SRB	Miloš Šaka (from Žarkovo)
17	MF	MKD	Ostoja Stjepanović (from (North Macedonia) Makedonija Gjorče Petrov)
30	FW	SRB	Darko Bjedov (from (Kazakhstan) Atyrau)
20	DF	SRB	Branislav Milošević (from (Czech Republic) Dukla Prague)
10	MF	SRB	Miloš Bosančić (from Voždovac)
18	DF	SRB	Nemanja Petrović (from Napredak Kruševac)
21	FW	MNE	Ljubomir Kovačević (free, last with Zemun)
87	MF	SRB	Aleksandar Trninić (from (Kuwait) Al-Shabab)

Out: Note: Flags indicate national team as defined under FIFA eligibility rules; some limited exceptions apply. Players may hold more than one non-FIFA nationality.

No.	Pos.	Nation	Player
1	GK	SRB	Rastko Šuljagić (to Radnički Pirot)
17	FW	SRB	Aleksandar Lutovac (to Partizan)
16	FW	SRB	Luka Čumić (to Metalac G.M.)
44	MF	SRB	Filip Bainović (to (Poland) Górnik Zabrze)
47	FW	SRB	Stefan Mihajlović (to Radnički Niš)
23	DF	SRB	Nikola Šipčić (to (Spain) Tenerife)
33	MF	SRB	Milorad Balabanović (to Proleter Novi Sad)
—	MF	SRB	Marko Stojanović (to Bačka BP, was on loan at Vršac)
19	FW	SRB	Borko Veselinović (to Sinđelić Beograd)
99	FW	SRB	Dejan Parađina (to Kolubara)
14	MF	SRB	Njegoš Petrović (to Red Star Belgrade)
11	FW	SRB	Bogdan Mladenović (to (Portugal) Gil Vicente)
20	MF	SRB	Branislav Jovanović (to Proleter Novi Sad)
—	DF	SRB	Miloš Marković (to Dinamo Vranje)
3	DF	MNE	Vladimir Volkov (to (Bosnia and Herzegovina) Borac Banja Luka)

=== TSC ===
In: Note: Flags indicate national team as defined under FIFA eligibility rules; some limited exceptions apply. Players may hold more than one non-FIFA nationality.

No.	Pos.	Nation	Player
24	MF	SRB	Srđan Grabež (from Bačka BP)
17	DF	SRB	Goran Antonić (from (Armenia) Alashkert)
7	MF	MNE	Janko Tumbasević (from Mladost Lučani)
26	DF	SRB	Bojan Balaž (from Partizan)
22	MF	ROU	Barna Antal (from (Romania) Miercurea Ciuc)
20	FW	SRB	Borko Duronjić (from Voždovac)

Out: Note: Flags indicate national team as defined under FIFA eligibility rules; some limited exceptions apply. Players may hold more than one non-FIFA nationality.

No.	Pos.	Nation	Player
20	MF	SRB	Miloš Plavšić (to (Bosnia and Herzegovina) Radnik Bijeljina)
16	MF	HUN	Norbert Pintér (to (Hungary) Szeged 2011)
7	MF	SRB	Miloš Milisavljević (to Kolubara)
14	DF	SRB	Nebojša Mezei (to Bačka 1901)
22	FW	SRB	Aleksandar Erak (to Hajduk Kula)
24	DF	SRB	Dejan Stojaković (released)
—	GK	SRB	Luka Krstović (on loan to Smederevo 1924, previously brought from Red Star Belgrade)

=== Javor Ivanjica ===
In: Note: Flags indicate national team as defined under FIFA eligibility rules; some limited exceptions apply. Players may hold more than one non-FIFA nationality.

No.	Pos.	Nation	Player
4	DF	SRB	Marko Jevremović (from Mladost Lučani)
15	DF	SRB	Filip Pavišić (from Dinamo Vranje)
31	FW	SRB	Vladimir Jovanović (from Brodarac)
30	MF	SRB	Vanja Zvekanov (from (Italy) Genoa)
19	FW	SRB	Nikola Milošević (from Bežanija)
2	DF	SRB	Veljko Filipović (from Borac Čačak)

Out: Note: Flags indicate national team as defined under FIFA eligibility rules; some limited exceptions apply. Players may hold more than one non-FIFA nationality.

No.	Pos.	Nation	Player
26	DF	SRB	Jovan Marinković (to Bačka BP)
3	DF	SRB	Ivan Josović (to Inđija)
4	DF	SRB	Nemanja Anđelković (on loan to Zlatibor Čajetina)
19	MF	SRB	Nemanja Milovanović (to Bačka BP)

=== Inđija ===
In: Note: Flags indicate national team as defined under FIFA eligibility rules; some limited exceptions apply. Players may hold more than one non-FIFA nationality.

No.	Pos.	Nation	Player
22	MF	SRB	Milan Janjić (from (Kazakhstan) Caspiy)
25	MF	SRB	Vasilije Janjić (from Zemun)
27	MF	SRB	Branislav Tomić (from Bačka BP)
33	DF	SRB	Ivan Josović (from Javor Ivanjica)
32	FW	SRB	Filip Rajevac (from (Uzbekistan) Lokomotiv Tashkent)
5	DF	SRB	Žarko Marković (from (Kazakhstan) Kairat)
4	DF	PHI	Diego Bardanca (from (Poland) Bytovia Bytów)
30	FW	SRB	Brana Ilić (from (Hungary) Kisvárda)
35	FW	SRB	Vladan Milosavljev (from (Russia) Tyumen)
9	MF	SRB	Miloš Podunavac (from Zemun)
7	FW	SRB	Saša Jovanović (from (Austria) Wolfsberger AC)
31	MF	SRB	Luka Čermelj (from Radnički Niš)

Out: Note: Flags indicate national team as defined under FIFA eligibility rules; some limited exceptions apply. Players may hold more than one non-FIFA nationality.

No.	Pos.	Nation	Player
14	MF	MLT	Jamie Zerafa (loan return to (Malta) Balzan)
2	DF	SRB	Božidar Veličković (loan return to Voždovac)
16	MF	SRB	Igor Maksimović (loan return to Voždovac)
19	DF	SRB	Nenad Kočović (to Kabel)
24	FW	SEN	Badara Badji (to (Bosnia and Herzegovina) Zvijezda 09)
9	FW	SRB	Ognjen Damnjanović (to Sloboda Užice)
20	FW	SRB	Aleksa Andrejić (to (Malta) Tarxien Rainbows)
7	FW	SRB	Milan Bubalo (to Novi Pazar, previously bought from (Thailand) Lamphun Warrior)
—	FW	SRB	Nebojša Ivančević (to Radnički 1923)

== Serbian First League ==
=== Dinamo Vranje ===
In: Note: Flags indicate national team as defined under FIFA eligibility rules; some limited exceptions apply. Players may hold more than one non-FIFA nationality.

No.	Pos.	Nation	Player
9	FW	SRB	Matija Babović (from Partizan)
—	DF	SRB	Miloš Miličković (from Hajduk Kula)
—		SRB	Nemanja Božović (from BASK)
29	DF	SRB	Filip Stamenković (from Radnički Beograd)
7	MF	SRB	Filip Bajić (from Bečej)
—	DF	SRB	Dragoslav Sremčević (from Bratstvo Prigrevica)
30	FW	SRB	Stefan Đokić (from Temnić 1924)
—		SRB	Miloš Branković (from (Slovakia) MFK Nová Baňa)
1	GK	MNE	Stefan Popović (from (Montenegro) Petrovac)
5	MF	SRB	Milan Ilić (from Jedinstvo Ub)
—		SRB	Xhavit Veliu (from Lugina)
4	DF	SRB	Miloš Zlatković (from Zemun)
27	DF	SRB	Nikola Jaćimović (from (North Macedonia) Pobeda)
9	FW	SRB	Mladen Popović (from Cement Beočin)
25	DF	MNE	Janko Simović (from (Montenegro) Rudar Pljevlja)
17	FW	SRB	Enes Dolovac (from (Greece) PAS Giannina)
20	MF	SRB	Nikola Mitić (from (Malta) Senglea Athletic)
28	FW	SRB	Vladimir Radočaj (from (Lithuania) Palanga)
33	DF	SRB	Miloš Marković (from Rad)

Out: Note: Flags indicate national team as defined under FIFA eligibility rules; some limited exceptions apply. Players may hold more than one non-FIFA nationality.

No.	Pos.	Nation	Player
15	DF	SRB	Danijel Gašić (retired)
9	DF	SRB	Željko Dimitrov (released)
21	GK	SRB	Nikola Lakić (to (Bosnia and Herzegovina) Sloboda Tuzla)
10	FW	GHA	Zakaria Suraka (to Mladost Lučani)
12	DF	MNE	Lazar Đokić (to (Switzerland) Pajde Möhlin)
7	DF	SRB	Nikola Vukajlović (to Zemun)
8	MF	SRB	Marko Đurišić (to Vojvodina)
22	MF	SRB	Miloš Ožegović (to Napredak Kruševac)
2	DF	SRB	Vladimir Ilić (to Sinđelić Beograd)
—	FW	SRB	Luka Ratković (released)

=== Zemun ===
In: Note: Flags indicate national team as defined under FIFA eligibility rules; some limited exceptions apply. Players may hold more than one non-FIFA nationality.

No.	Pos.	Nation	Player
2	DF	SRB	Igor Spajić (from Bežanija)
7	DF	SRB	Nikola Vujaklović (from Dinamo Vranje)
8	FW	SRB	Luka Grgić (from Hajduk Kula)
17	FW	SRB	Zoran Mihailović (from Žarkovo)
25	MF	SRB	Miloš Pavlović (from Voždovac)
26	MF	SRB	Strahinja Bosanac (from Brodarac)
31	MF	SRB	Igor Krmar (from (Bosnia and Herzegovina) Sloga Gornje Crnjelovo)
44	MF	SRB	Nenad Adžibaba (on loan from Red Star Belgrade)
55	FW	SRB	Dean Tišma (from Sloboda Užice)
17	FW	SRB	Jovan Kastratović (from Bačka BP)
13	MF	SRB	Saša Filipović (from Proleter Novi Sad)
21	MF	CHN	Deng Yanlin (from (China) Guangzhou R&F)
28	MF	BIH	Nenad Kiso (was on loan, now signed from Čukarički)
30	MF	GER	Dušan Crnomut (free, last with from (Luxembourg) US Mondorf-les-Bains)

Out: Note: Flags indicate national team as defined under FIFA eligibility rules; some limited exceptions apply. Players may hold more than one non-FIFA nationality.

No.	Pos.	Nation	Player
27	MF	SRB	Nikola Stojković (to Smederevo 1924)
26	MF	SRB	Nemanja Tomić (to Radnički Niš)
5	DF	SRB	Nenad Cvetković (to Voždovac)
17	DF	BIH	Borislav Terzić (to (Bosnia and Herzegovina) Tuzla City)
24	DF	SRB	Milan Savić (to (Croatia) Inter Zaprešić)
31	DF	SRB	Nemanja Vučić (to Vojvodina)
16	MF	SRB	Vasilije Janjić (to Inđija)
15	DF	MNE	Emir Azemović (to (Poland) Raków Częstochowa)
30	DF	SRB	Filip Pavišić (to Javor Ivanjica)
1	GK	SRB	Marko Milošević (to Napredak Kruševac)
27	MF	SRB	Nikola Stojković (to Smederevo 1924)
32	MF	SRB	Miloš Podunavac (to Inđija)
13	DF	SRB	Miloš Zlatković (to Dinamo Vranje)
8	MF	SRB	Luka Sinđić (to Sinđelić Beograd)
55	MF	SRB	Vladimir Petrović (to OFK Žarkovo)
14	FW	NGR	Moses John (to Novi Pazar)
9	FW	MNE	Filip Kukuličić (to Grafičar Beograd)
25	DF	SRB	Mihailo Milutinović (to Spartak Subotica)
2	DF	SRB	Siniša Mladenović (to Grafičar Beograd)

=== Bačka BP ===
In: Note: Flags indicate national team as defined under FIFA eligibility rules; some limited exceptions apply. Players may hold more than one non-FIFA nationality.

No.	Pos.	Nation	Player
4	DF	SRB	Jovan Marinković (from Javor Matis)
3	DF	SRB	Mladen Veselinović (from Hajduk Kula)
21	MF	SRB	Nikola Stojanović (from (Greece) Sparti)
8	FW	SRB	Marko Simić (from Sloboda Užice)
7	MF	SRB	Elmir Asani (from (Albania) Skënderbeu Korçë)
5	DF	SRB	Dimitrije Tomović (from Hajduk Kula)
24	FW	SRB	Krsta Djordjević (free, last with Žarkovo)
10	MF	SRB	Nemanja Krstić (from Metalac G. M.)
11	FW	SRB	Aleksandar Dimitrić (from Radnički 1923)
6	MF	SRB	Nemanja Obrenović (from (Belarus) Energetik-BGU)
29	MF	SRB	Marko Stojanović (from Rad)
22	MF	SRB	Nemanja Milovanović (from Javor Matis)
27	MF	SRB	Mateja Stojanović (from Red Star Belgrade)
25	FW	MNE	Drago Milović (from OFK Žarkovo)
14	FW	SRB	Despot Obrenović (from Mladost Lučani)
9	FW	SRB	Stefan Ilić (from Metalac G. M.)
28	DF	BIH	Nemanja Vještica (from Partizan)
13	MF	SRB	Ivan Perić (from (Greece) Kalamata)
30	FW	SRB	Nikola Gajić (from (Spain) Extremadura B)
19	DF	SRB	Dejan Kukić (from (Slovenia) Fužinar)

Out: Note: Flags indicate national team as defined under FIFA eligibility rules; some limited exceptions apply. Players may hold more than one non-FIFA nationality.

No.	Pos.	Nation	Player
2	DF	SRB	Nikola Đurić (to (Montenegro) Budućnost Podgorica)
19	MF	SRB	Srđan Grabež (to TSC)
9	MF	SRB	Milan Makarić (to Radnički Niš)
1	GK	MNE	Bojan Zogović (to (Azerbaijan) Zira)
4	DF	SRB	Nemanja Ilić (to (North Macedonia) Rabotnički)
5	DF	SRB	Darko Gojković (to Metalac G. M.)
6	DF	SRB	Dragan Žarković (released)
7	FW	SRB	Miloš Gordić (to Smederevo 1924)
8	MF	SRB	Miroslav Bjeloš (to Napredak Kruševac)
14	FW	SRB	Luka Mićić (to Radnik Surdulica)
22	MF	SRB	Vojislav Balabanović (to Kabel)
24	MF	SRB	Dušan Kuveljić (to Smederevo 1924)
27	MF	SRB	Nebojša Gavrić (to (Bosnia and Herzegovina) Sarajevo)
21	MF	SRB	Branislav Tomić (to Inđija)
23	MF	SRB	Milan Spremo (to Napredak Kruševac)
25	MF	SRB	Uglješa Radinović (to Proleter Novi Sad)
13	DF	SRB	Stefan Jovanović (to Proleter Novi Sad)
16	MF	SRB	Marko Pantić (to Proleter Novi Sad)
—	GK	SRB	Kristijan Župić (was on loan, now signed with (Croatia) NK Osijek II)
18	FW	BIH	Luka Asentić (to (Slovenia) Mura)
—	FW	SRB	Jovan Kastratović (to Zemun, previously bought from BSK Borča)

=== Radnički 1923 ===
In: Note: Flags indicate national team as defined under FIFA eligibility rules; some limited exceptions apply. Players may hold more than one non-FIFA nationality.

No.	Pos.	Nation	Player
11	MF	SRB	Vladimir Ćirović (from Kolubara)
1	GK	SRB	Vladimir Savić (from Mladi Radnik 1926)
16	MF	SRB	Uroš Vidović (from Hong Kong Rangers)
20	FW	SRB	Velimir Popović (from Jedinstvo Ub)
14	MF	SRB	Miodrag Milenković (from Novi Pazar)
35	DF	SRB	Stefan Filipović (from (Montenegro) Budućnost Podgorica)
3	DF	SRB	Slađan Mijatović (from Žarkovo)
9	FW	SRB	Slađan Nikodijević (from Radnički Niš)
77	FW	SRB	Nebojša Ivančević (from Inđija)

Out: Note: Flags indicate national team as defined under FIFA eligibility rules; some limited exceptions apply. Players may hold more than one non-FIFA nationality.

No.	Pos.	Nation	Player
11	MF	SRB	Mile Vujasin (to Mačva Šabac)
10	FW	SRB	Jovan Lukić (to Novi Pazar)
8	FW	SRB	Aleksandar Dimitrić (to Bačka BP)

=== Metalac G. M. ===
In: Note: Flags indicate national team as defined under FIFA eligibility rules; some limited exceptions apply. Players may hold more than one non-FIFA nationality.

No.	Pos.	Nation	Player
77	DF	SRB	Jovan Vlalukin (from Partizan)
22	MF	SRB	Milan Jokić (from Zlatibor Čajetina)
99	FW	SRB	Luka Čumić (from Rad)
14	FW	SRB	Predrag Radić (from Čukarički)
12	GK	MNE	Nemanja Šćekić (from Žarkovo)
9	FW	SRB	Nikola Nović (from Partizan)
23	MF	MNE	Bojan Vlaović (from Brodarac)
15	FW	SRB	Aleksandar Katanić (from Bežanija)
5	DF	SRB	Darko Gojković (from Bačka BP)
17	MF	SRB	Marko Zoćević (from (Uzbekistan) AGMK)
4	MF	SRB	Igor Maksimović (from Voždovac, was on loan at Inđija)

Out: Note: Flags indicate national team as defined under FIFA eligibility rules; some limited exceptions apply. Players may hold more than one non-FIFA nationality.

No.	Pos.	Nation	Player
15	FW	SRB	Stefan Ilić (to Bačka BP)
12	GK	SRB	Ivan Kostić (to Radnik Surdulica)
14	FW	SRB	Admir Kecap (to Trayal Kruševac)
5	DF	SRB	Boris Milekić (released)
21	MF	SRB	Nemanja Krstić (to Bačka BP)
—	MF	SRB	Stefan Vukadin (to Grafičar Beograd)

=== Zlatibor Čajetina ===
In: Note: Flags indicate national team as defined under FIFA eligibility rules; some limited exceptions apply. Players may hold more than one non-FIFA nationality.

No.	Pos.	Nation	Player
5	MF	SRB	Nikola Nikodijević (from Bežanija)
7	DF	SRB	Petar Jovanović (from Mladost Lučani)
26	DF	SRB	Nemanja Anđelković (on loan from Javor Ivanjica)
19	DF	JPN	Ryoya Tachibana (from (Montenegro) Petrovac)
2	DF	SRB	Milan Jezdimirović (from Sloboda Užice)
8	MF	SRB	Marko Stojanović (from Rad)
29	MF	SRB	Krsta Bojić (from Bežanija)
24	FW	SRB	Luka Đokić (from OFK Beograd)
33	MF	SRB	Nikola Divac (from Bežanija)
18	MF	JPN	Hiroya Kiyomoto (from (Montenegro) Igalo 1929)
25	FW	SRB	Uroš Vesić (from Trayal Kruševac)
30	FW	RUS	Maksim Artemchuk (from (Russia) Sochi)
9	FW	SRB	Milan Đokić (from Moravac Mrštane)
14	FW	SRB	Uroš Stamenić (from Proleter Novi Sad)
20	DF	KOR	Geehyeon Lee (from)
6	MF	MNE	Danilo Dašić (from (Montenegro) Berane)

Out: Note: Flags indicate national team as defined under FIFA eligibility rules; some limited exceptions apply. Players may hold more than one non-FIFA nationality.

No.	Pos.	Nation	Player
10	MF	SRB	Milan Jokić (to Metalac G. M.)
23	DF	SRB	Bogdan Miličić (to (Armenia) Shirak)
30	DF	SRB	Aleksandar Dragačević (to Sinđelić Beograd)
22	GK	SRB	Dalibor Divac (to Novi Pazar)
4	MF	SRB	Marko Živanović (to Budućnost Dobanovci)
15	DF	SRB	Milan Milanović (to Novi Pazar)
19	DF	SRB	Nenad Rašević (to (Bosnia and Herzegovina) Tekstilac Derventa)

=== Sinđelić Beograd ===
In: Note: Flags indicate national team as defined under FIFA eligibility rules; some limited exceptions apply. Players may hold more than one non-FIFA nationality.

No.	Pos.	Nation	Player
21	DF	SRB	Aleksandar Dragačević (from Zlatibor Čajetina)
9	FW	SRB	Vanja Vučićević (from (Russia) Krylia Sovetov Samara)
21	MF	SRB	Luka Sinđić (from Zemun)
30	MF	SRB	Tigran Goranović (from IMT)
8	FW	SRB	Borko Veselinović (from Rad)
29	DF	SRB	Vladimir Ilić (from Dinamo Vranje)
14	FW	SRB	Uroš Tomović (from Radnički Pirot)
23	DF	SRB	Filip Milićević (from Spartak Subotica)
3	DF	SRB	Draško Đorđević (from Spartak Subotica)
20	FW	SRB	Pavle Radunović (free, last with (Russia) Baltika Kaliningrad)
12	FW	SRB	Mihajlo Cakić (from (Tajikistan) Istiklol)
15	MF	SRB	Milosav Sićović (from Kabel)

Out: Note: Flags indicate national team as defined under FIFA eligibility rules; some limited exceptions apply. Players may hold more than one non-FIFA nationality.

No.	Pos.	Nation	Player
3	MF	SRB	Jovica Blagojević (loan return to Voždovac)
1	GK	SRB	Marko Trkulja (to Voždovac)
7	MF	SRB	Stefan Matijević (to Smederevo 1924)
8	MF	SRB	Nenad Stanković (to Radnik Surdulica)
28	MF	SRB	Aleksa Denković (to Budućnost Dobanovci)
20	MF	SRB	Aleksa Vujić (to Kabel)
—	MF	SRB	Miloš Krstić (to Kolubara)

=== Trayal Kruševac ===
In: Note: Flags indicate national team as defined under FIFA eligibility rules; some limited exceptions apply. Players may hold more than one non-FIFA nationality.

No.	Pos.	Nation	Player
14	FW	SRB	Admir Kecap (from Metalac G. M.)
10	MF	SRB	Đorđe Radovanović (from Spartak Subotica)
2	DF	SRB	Sava Radić (from Čukarički)
11	MF	GAM	Ousman Joof (from (The Gambia) Marimoo)
6	DF	SRB	Nemanja Trajković (from Smederevo 1924)
45	MF	GHA	Baba Musah (from Napredak Kruševac)

Out: Note: Flags indicate national team as defined under FIFA eligibility rules; some limited exceptions apply. Players may hold more than one non-FIFA nationality.

No.	Pos.	Nation	Player
14	MF	GAM	Ousman Marong (to Red Star Belgrade)
19	FW	SRB	Uroš Vesić (to Zlatibor Čajetina)

=== Budućnost Dobanovci ===
In: Note: Flags indicate national team as defined under FIFA eligibility rules; some limited exceptions apply. Players may hold more than one non-FIFA nationality.

No.	Pos.	Nation	Player
23	MF	SRB	Aleksa Denković (from Sinđelić Beograd)
69	GK	SRB	Lazar Tatić (from (Greece) AO Trikala)
19	FW	SRB	Uroš Vuković (free, last with (Slovakia) Sereď)
1	GK	SRB	Stevan Jovanović (from Jagodina)
8	MF	SRB	Filip Markišić (free, last with Radnički 1923)
26	FW	SRB	Nemanja Perić (from Borac Čačak)
25	MF	SRB	Radovan Avram (from Voždovac)
16	MF	SRB	Marko Živanović (from Zlatibor Čajetina)
16	MF	SRB	Marko Živanović (from Zlatibor Čajetina)
5	DF	SRB	Miloš Stojanović (from Voždovac)
13	MF	SRB	Marko Despotović (from Bežanija)
24	MF	SRB	Ivan Jovanović (from Radnički Sremska Mitrovica)

Out: Note: Flags indicate national team as defined under FIFA eligibility rules; some limited exceptions apply. Players may hold more than one non-FIFA nationality.

No.	Pos.	Nation	Player
20	FW	SRB	Lazar Milošev (to (Slovenia) Tabor Sežana)
13	DF	SRB	Milan Jagodić (to Rad)
19	MF	SRB	Stevan Luković (to (Austria) SV Lafnitz)
12	GK	SRB	Aleksandar Kirovski (to OFK Žarkovo)
—	FW	SRB	Milorad Dabić (to Sloboda Užice)

=== OFK Žarkovo ===
In: Note: Flags indicate national team as defined under FIFA eligibility rules; some limited exceptions apply. Players may hold more than one non-FIFA nationality.

No.	Pos.	Nation	Player
8	MF	SRB	Danko Kiković (was on loan, now signed from Mladost Lučani)
6	DF	SRB	Marko Šiškov (from Teleoptik)
17	MF	BIH	Saša Perić (from (Switzerland) Schaffhausen)
12	GK	SRB	Aleksandar Kirovski (from Budućnost Dobanovci)
24	FW	BIH	Stevo Nikolić (from (Bosnia and Herzegovina) Čelik Zenica)
3	DF	BIH	Marko Čubrilo (from (Slovenia) Domžale)
20	MF	SRB	Vladimir Petrović (from Zemun)
77	FW	SRB	Igor Aničić (from (Bosnia and Herzegovina) Borac Banja Luka)
7	MF	MKD	Nikola Bogdanovski (from Bežanija)
23	MF	SRB	Stefan Kovačević (from Borac Čačak)
32	MF	SRB	Dejan Babić (from Mačva Šabac)
9	FW	SRB	Mladen Lukić (from Proleter Novi Sad, previously sold to same club)
18	MF	SRB	Nikola Ilić (from Proleter Novi Sad)
15	DF	SRB	Stefan Golubović (from Proleter Novi Sad)
19	DF	SRB	Nikola Tasić (from Borac Čačak)

Out: Note: Flags indicate national team as defined under FIFA eligibility rules; some limited exceptions apply. Players may hold more than one non-FIFA nationality.

No.	Pos.	Nation	Player
1	GK	MNE	Nemanja Šćekić (to Metalac G. M.)
20	DF	SRB	Slađan Mijatović (to Radnički 1923)
11	FW	UKR	Yevhen Kovalenko (to Rad)
5	MF	SRB	Miloš Šaka (to Rad)
17	FW	SRB	Zoran Mihailović (to Zemun)
—	FW	MNE	Drago Milović (to Bačka BP)

=== Kabel ===
In: Note: Flags indicate national team as defined under FIFA eligibility rules; some limited exceptions apply. Players may hold more than one non-FIFA nationality.

No.	Pos.	Nation	Player
15	DF	SRB	Nemanja Kojčić (from Hajduk Kula)
10	FW	SRB	Kosta Dražić (from Bečej)
13	DF	SRB	Nenad Kočović (from Inđija)
22	MF	BIH	Predrag Vladić (loan extension from Vojvodina)
7	FW	BIH	Đorđe Pantelić (loan extension from Vojvodina)
21	DF	SRB	Marko Mandić (on loan from Vojvodina)
3	DF	SRB	Marko Bjeković (on loan from Vojvodina)
5	DF	SRB	Milovan Petrić (from Bečej)
9	FW	SRB	Luka Jovanić (from Hajduk Kula)
11	DF	SRB	Milan Srbijanac (from Bratstvo 1946)
20	DF	SRB	Faruk Bihorac (from Novi Pazar)
18	MF	SRB	Aleksa Vujić (from Sinđelić Beograd)
17	MF	SRB	Vojislav Balabanović (from Bačka BP)
23	MF	SRB	Predrag Govedarica (from Grafičar Beograd)
12	GK	SRB	Vukašin Pilipović (loan extension from Vojvodina)

Out: Note: Flags indicate national team as defined under FIFA eligibility rules; some limited exceptions apply. Players may hold more than one non-FIFA nationality.

No.	Pos.	Nation	Player
—	DF	SRB	Đorđe Knežević (loan return to Vojvodina)
—	MF	SRB	Milosav Sićović (to Sinđelić Beograd)

=== Novi Pazar ===
In: Note: Flags indicate national team as defined under FIFA eligibility rules; some limited exceptions apply. Players may hold more than one non-FIFA nationality.

No.	Pos.	Nation	Player
11	MF	SRB	Matija Miketić (from Mačva Šabac)
2	DF	SRB	Denis Biševac (from (Bosnia and Herzegovina) Velež Mostar)
1	GK	SRB	Dalibor Divac (from Zlatibor Čajetina)
21	MF	SRB	Lazar Pajović (from (Montenegro) Petrovac)
5	MF	BIH	Mirza Delimeđac (from (Singapore) Tampines Rovers)
8	DF	SRB	Slobodan Rubežić (from Čukarički)
4	DF	SRB	Miloš Lekić (from Loznica)
14	MF	MNE	Ivan Pejaković (from (Montenegro) Lovćen)
15	DF	SRB	Milan Milanović (from Zlatibor Čajetina)
26	MF	SRB	Sead Islamović (from Radnik Surdulica, previously sold to same club)
29	FW	SRB	Milan Bubalo (from Inđija)
84	FW	SRB	Enver Alivodić (from Napredak Kruševac)
16	MF	SRB	Filip Jović (from Napredak Kruševac)

Out: Note: Flags indicate national team as defined under FIFA eligibility rules; some limited exceptions apply. Players may hold more than one non-FIFA nationality.

No.	Pos.	Nation	Player
51	FW	SRB	Nemanja Petrov (to (Montenegro) Grbalj)
5	DF	SRB	Faruk Bihorac (to Kabel)
91	MF	SRB	Miodrag Milenković (to Radnički 1923)
21	GK	MNE	Zoran Aković (to (Montenegro) Zeta)
18	FW	NGR	Moses John (to Smederevo 1924, previously bought from Zemun)

=== Grafičar Beograd ===
In: Note: Flags indicate national team as defined under FIFA eligibility rules; some limited exceptions apply. Players may hold more than one non-FIFA nationality.

No.	Pos.	Nation	Player
11	MF	GAM	Ousman Marong (on loan from Red Star Belgrade)
2	FW	SRB	Jug Stanojev (loan extension from Red Star Belgrade)
3	DF	SRB	Marko Konatar (loan extension from Red Star Belgrade)
10	MF	SRB	Željko Gavrić (loan extension from Red Star Belgrade)
9	FW	SRB	Dejan Vidić (on loan from Red Star Belgrade)
12	GK	SRB	Strahinja Savić (loan extension from Red Star Belgrade)
4	DF	SRB	Nemanja Stojić (loan extension from Red Star Belgrade)
8	MF	BIH	Stefan Santrač (loan extension from Red Star Belgrade)
16	MF	SRB	Miloš Nikolić (loan extension from Red Star Belgrade)
24	MF	SRB	Stefan Fićović (on loan from Red Star Belgrade)
18	FW	SRB	Milan Panović (from IMT)
23	FW	SRB	Miloš Džugurdić (from (Montenegro) Grbalj)
26	FW	MNE	Filip Kukuličić (from Zemun)
27	MF	SRB	Stefan Vukadin (from Metalac G. M.)
28	DF	SRB	Siniša Mladenović (from Zemun)

Out: Note: Flags indicate national team as defined under FIFA eligibility rules; some limited exceptions apply. Players may hold more than one non-FIFA nationality.

No.	Pos.	Nation	Player
—	DF	SRB	Aleksa Terzić (loan return to Red Star Belgrade)
—	MF	SRB	Stefan Cvetković (loan return to Red Star Belgrade)
—	DF	SRB	Damjan Daničić (loan return to Red Star Belgrade)
—	GK	SRB	Aleksandar Stanković (loan return to Red Star Belgrade)
—	FW	BIH	Aleksa Spaić (to (Montenegro) Grbalj)
—	FW	SRB	Radomir Krstin (to (Montenegro) Bokelj)
19	MF	SRB	Veljko Nikolić (loan return to Red Star Belgrade)
—	DF	SRB	Matija Košanin (to (Croatia) BSK Bijelo Brdo)
—	FW	MKD	Strahinja Krstevski (loan return to Red Star Belgrade)
19	MF	SRB	Predrag Govedarica (to Kabel, previously bought from Proleter Novi Sad)

=== Radnički Pirot ===
In: Note: Flags indicate national team as defined under FIFA eligibility rules; some limited exceptions apply. Players may hold more than one non-FIFA nationality.

No.	Pos.	Nation	Player
32	MF	SRB	Marko Milenković (from Sloboda Užice)
37	GK	SRB	Rastko Šuljagić (from Rad)
44	MF	SRB	Nemanja Spasojević (from (Slovakia) Spartak Trnava)
30	MF	SRB	Strahinja Petrović (from Car Konstantin)
7	MF	SRB	Lazar Manić (from Dunav Prahovo)
28	MF	SRB	Aleksa Kostić-Milutinović (from Dubočica)
11	FW	GRE	Konstantinos Galeadis (from (Italy) Nuorese)
9	FW	SRB	Mitar Radivojević (from Moravac Orion)
23	MF	SRB	Uroš Mirković (from Sinđelić Beograd)
17	MF	CMR	Guy Edoa (free, last with (United States) Tacoma Defiance)
19	MF	GHA	Joseph Bempah (from Proleter Novi Sad)
27	DF	SRB	Petar Ćirković (loan extension from Radnički Niš)
31	GK	SRB	Nikola Stanimirović (from Dunav Prahovo)

Out: Note: Flags indicate national team as defined under FIFA eligibility rules; some limited exceptions apply. Players may hold more than one non-FIFA nationality.

No.	Pos.	Nation	Player
—	DF	SRB	Petar Ćirković (loan return to Radnički Niš)
26	FW	SRB	Miloš Rnić (to Smederevo 1924)
—	FW	SRB	Miloš Bajić (to Smederevo 1924)

=== Smederevo 1924 ===
In: Note: Flags indicate national team as defined under FIFA eligibility rules; some limited exceptions apply. Players may hold more than one non-FIFA nationality.

No.	Pos.	Nation	Player
14	MF	SRB	Aleksandar Mirkov (from Vojvodina)
16	FW	SRB	Miloš Đorđević (from (Bosnia and Herzegovina) Tekstilac Derventa)
23	MF	SRB	Stefan Matijević (from Sinđelić Beograd)
77	FW	SRB	Miloš Gordić (from Bačka BP)
19	DF	AUT	Tode Đaković (from (Austria) Deutschlandsberger SC)
8	MF	SRB	Nikola Stojković (from Zemun)
22	MF	SRB	Dušan Kuveljić (from Bačka BP)
12	GK	SRB	Ivan Lučić (from Spartak Subotica)
33	DF	SRB	Sreten Atanasković (from Borac Sakule)
44	DF	SRB	Lazar Marković (from Vršac)
69	DF	SRB	Slađan Rakić (from Spartak Subotica)
17	FW	SRB	Nikola Đorđević (from Sloga PM)
20	MF	CHN	Qingshen Zeng (from (Denmark) Vejle)
21	FW	NGR	Moses John (from Novi Pazar)
26	FW	SRB	Miloš Rnić (from Radnički Pirot)
29	MF	SRB	Filip Ilić (from Teleoptik)
30	MF	CHN	Li Siqi (from (China) Beijing Sinobo Guoan)
99	FW	SRB	Miloš Bajić (from Radnički Pirot)
24	DF	CRO	Arian Mršulja (from (Malta) Birkirkara)
94	FW	SUI	Milan Basrak (from (Slovakia) 1. FC Tatran)
1	GK	SRB	Luka Krstović (on loan from TSC)
15	MF	AUS	Anthony Trajkoski (from (Armenia) Ararat Yerevan)

Out: Note: Flags indicate national team as defined under FIFA eligibility rules; some limited exceptions apply. Players may hold more than one non-FIFA nationality.

No.	Pos.	Nation	Player
—	MF	SRB	Stefan Stojanović (to Jagodina)
—	FW	SRB	Ninoslav Nikolić (to Jagodina)
—	DF	SRB	Nemanja Trajković (to Trayal Kruševac)

=== Kolubara ===
In: Note: Flags indicate national team as defined under FIFA eligibility rules; some limited exceptions apply. Players may hold more than one non-FIFA nationality.

No.	Pos.	Nation	Player
17	MF	SRB	Aleksandar Jovanović (from Radnički Niš)
24	MF	SRB	Filip Osman (from Sinđelić Beograd)
25	FW	SRB	Dejan Parađina (from Rad)
1	GK	SRB	Miloš Rnić (from Bežanija)
9	FW	SRB	Dejan Đenić (from Spartak Subotica)
23	MF	SRB	Marko Vučetić (from Bežanija)
5	DF	SRB	Luka Jeličić (from Bežanija)
20	MF	SRB	Miloš Krstić (from Sinđelić Beograd)
27	DF	SRB	Josip Projić (from (Russia) Fakel Voronezh)
26	FW	SRB	Andrija Ratković (from Proleter Novi Sad)
14	MF	SRB	Miloš Milisavljević (from TSC)

Out: Note: Flags indicate national team as defined under FIFA eligibility rules; some limited exceptions apply. Players may hold more than one non-FIFA nationality.

No.	Pos.	Nation	Player
—	MF	SRB	Vladimir Ćirović (to Radnički 1923)

== See also ==
- Serbian SuperLiga
- Serbian First League
