= Marko Stojanović =

Marko Stojanović may refer to:

- Marko Stojanović (actor) (born 1971), Serbian celebrity
- Marko Stojanović (footballer, born 1994), German-Serbian footballer
- Marko Stojanović (footballer, born 1998), Serbian footballer
- Marko Stojanović, (volleyball coach, born 1994), Serbian volleyball coach

== See also ==
- Mirko Stojanović (born 1939), Croatian footballer
