= Drazic =

Drazic may refer to:

- Dražić, a Serbo-Croatian surname
- Dražíč, a municipality and village in the Czech Republic
