= Katanić =

Katanić (Serbian: Катанић) is a surname found in Serbia and Croatia. People with the name include:

- Aleksandar Katanić (born 1995), Serbian football player
- Jelena Katanić (born 1988), Serbian biochemist
- Marko Katanić (volleyball) (born 1961), Luxembourgian volleyball player
- Marko Katanić (colonel) (1830–1907), Serbian honorary general
- Mihailo Katanić, Serbian officer
- Sasa Katanić (born 1993), American / Serbian Entrepreneur
