= Ivan Lučić =

Ivan Lučić may refer to:

- Ivan Lučić-Lucius (1604–1679), Dalmatian historian
- Ivan Lučić (footballer, born 1995), Austrian football goalkeeper
- Ivan Lučić (footballer, born 1996), Serbian football goalkeeper
