= Nikola Gajić =

Serbian footballer

Personal information
- Full name: Nikola Gajić
- Date of birth: 23 April 1998 (age 28)
- Place of birth: Novi Sad, FR Yugoslavia
- Height: 1.90 m (6 ft 3 in)
- Position: Striker

Youth career
- 2006–2017: Vojvodina

Senior career*
Years	Team	Apps	(Gls)
2017–2019	Vojvodina	27	(1)
2017–2018	→ Cement Beočin (loan)	20	(9)
2019	Extremadura	0	(0)
2019	OFK Bačka	9	(1)
2020–2021	Kabel	10	(1)
2021	Radnički Pirot	13	(0)
2021	Radnik Bijeljina	8	(0)
2022	Rad	4	(0)
2022	Kabel		
2023	Ušće		
2023	RFK Novi Sad	1	(0)

International career
2015	Serbia U17	3	(0)
2018	Serbia U21	1	(0)
- * Club domestic league appearances and goals as of 22 May 2022

Nikola Gajić (Serbian Cyrillic: Никола Гајић; born 23 April 1998) is a Serbian footballer.

== Club career ==
=== Vojvodina ===
On 25 April 2018 Gajić made his debut for Vojvodina, in 2–1 away loss to Voždovac.

==== Loan to Cement ====
After the first unsuccessful 6-month-loan in Cement which ended with injury, Gajić got another chance to prove his talent in August 2017 with another loan. He scored 9 goals and had 5 assists in 15 games what recommended him to the first team of Vojvodina.

=== Extremadura ===
On 4 August 2019 Gajić agreed a four-year deal with Spanish side Extremadura. although the team fell into financial difficulties and collapsed during 2022.

== International career ==
Gajić was called in Serbia U17 national team squad during the 2015. He made his debut for the under-21 team in a friendly against the Macedonia U21s in November 2018.

== Career statistics ==
As of 20 October 2020

Appearances and goals by club, season and competition
Club	Season	League			Cup		Continental		Total	
Club	Season	Division	Apps	Goals	Apps	Goals	Apps	Goals	Apps	Goals
Cement Beočin (loan)	2016–17	Serbian League Vojvodina	5	0	—		—		5	0
Cement Beočin (loan)	2017–18	Serbian League Vojvodina	15	9	—		—		15	9
Cement Beočin (loan)	Total		20	9	—		—		20	9
Vojvodina	2017–18	Serbian SuperLiga	5	0	0	0	—		5	0
Vojvodina	2018–19	Serbian SuperLiga	22	1	3	0	—		25	1
Vojvodina	Total		27	1	3	0	—		30	1
Extremadura	2019–20	Segunda División	0	0	0	0	—		0	0
OFK Bačka	2019–20	Serbian First League	9	1	1	0	—		10	1
Kabel	2019–20	Serbian First League	5	1	0	0	—		5	1
Kabel	2020–21	Serbian First League	3	0	0	0	—		3	0
Kabel	Total		8	1	0	0	—		8	1
Career total			64	12	4	0	0	0	68	12
