= Zakaria Suraka =

Ghanaian footballer (born 1996)

Personal information
- Full name: Zakaria Isa Suraka
- Date of birth: 17 January 1996 (age 30)
- Place of birth: Accra, Ghana
- Height: 1.86 m (6 ft 1 in)
- Position: Forward

Team information
- Current team: Rudar Pljevlja
- Number: 7

Youth career
- Vision

Senior career*
| Years | Team | Apps | (Gls) |
| 2014 | Sloga Petrovac na Mlavi | 3 | (1) |
| 2014–2015 | Inđija | 19 | (3) |
| 2015–2016 | Radnik Surdulica | 7 | (0) |
| 2016–2019 | Dinamo Vranje | 74 | (23) |
| 2019–2020 | Mladost Lučani | 7 | (0) |
| 2020–2021 | Železničar Pančevo | 12 | (0) |
| 2021–2022 | Rudar Pljevlja | 15 | (2) |
| 2022 | Hong Linh Ha Tinh | 2 | (0) |
- * Club domestic league appearances and goals as of 17:45, 17 March 2021 (UTC)

Zakaria Isa Suraka (born 17 January 1996) is a Ghanaian professional footballer who plays as a forward for FK Rudar Pljevlja.

== Club career ==
Suraka arrived to Serbia from Vision F.C. in the spring of 2014. He joined Sloga Petrovac na Mlavi, and he made just 3 appearances for that club, but he scored 1 goal at the only match he started on the pitch. That was the last fixture of 2013–14 season, against Radnik Surdulica. People from FK Inđija recognized Suraka's football potential and take him in their club in summer 2014. There were some speculations about his transfer to Netherlands in the winter break off-season, but he stayed with club until the end of season.

For the 2014–15 season he made 19 Serbian First League appearances and scored 3 goals, against Moravac Mrštane in 2nd, Bežanija in 5th, Mačva Šabac in the 25th fixture. He also played 2 cup matches, against Javor Ivanjica, when he scored 2 goals, and Radnički Niš. Zakaria signed one-year contract with Radnik Surdulica in summer 2015. He made his SuperLiga in the 6th fixture of 2015–16, against Red Star Belgrade, when he was substituted in for Lazar Arsić in second half of the match.

In summer 2016, Suraka moved to Dinamo Vranje. He stayed at Dinamo for three years, becoming the club's best player. After Dinamo Vranje, he joined Mladost Lučani in summer 2019.

== Career statistics ==
=== Club ===
As of match played 29 November 2019.

Appearances and goals by club, season and competition
| Club | Season | League | | | Cup | | Continental | | Total | |
| Club | Season | Division | Apps | Goals | Apps | Goals | Apps | Goals | Apps | Goals |
|---|---|---|---|---|---|---|---|---|---|---|
| Sloga Petrovac na Mlavi | 2013–14 | Serbian First League | 3 | 1 | — | | — | | 3 | 1 |
| Inđija | 2014–15 | Serbian First League | 19 | 3 | 2 | 2 | — | | 21 | 5 |
| Radnik Surdulica | 2015–16 | Serbian SuperLiga | 7 | 0 | 1 | 0 | — | | 8 | 0 |
| Dinamo Vranje | 2016–17 | Serbian First League | 23 | 5 | 1 | 0 | — | | 24 | 5 |
| Dinamo Vranje | 2017–18 | Serbian First League | 28 | 17 | 1 | 0 | — | | 29 | 17 |
| Dinamo Vranje | 2018–19 | Serbian SuperLiga | 23 | 1 | 1 | 0 | — | | 24 | 1 |
| Dinamo Vranje | Total | | 74 | 23 | 3 | 0 | — | | 77 | 23 |
| Mladost Lučani | 2019–20 | Serbian SuperLiga | 7 | 0 | 1 | 0 | — | | 8 | 0 |
| Career total | | | 110 | 27 | 7 | 2 | — | | 117 | 27 |
