= Dražić =

Dražić (Cyrillic: Дражић) is a Serbo-Croatian surname, a patronymic derived from the given name Dražen. Notable people with the surname include:

- Darko Dražić (born 1963), Bosnian Croat football player and manager
- Dejan Dražić (born 1995), Serbian footballer
- Firmilijan Dražić (1852–1903), Metropolitan of Skopje
- Kosta Dražić (born 1998), Serbian footballer
- Mariana Dražić (born 1995), Croatian tennis player
- Stefan Dražić (born 1992), Serbian footballer

== See also ==
- Dražíč, village in the Czech Republic
