= Vladimir Ilić (footballer, born 1999) =

Serbian footballer

Personal information
- Full name: Vladimir Ilić
- Date of birth: 24 February 1999 (age 27)
- Place of birth: Sremska Mitrovica, FR Yugoslavia
- Height: 1.80 m (5 ft 11 in)
- Position: Right back

Team information
- Current team: Mačva Šabac
- Number: 4

Youth career
- Internacional Beograd

Senior career*
Years	Team	Apps	(Gls)
2018–2019	Dinamo Vranje	6	(0)
2019–2020	Sinđelić Beograd	21	(1)
2020–2024	Radnički Sremska Mitrovica	112	(1)
2024–2025	Sloven Ruma	11	(0)
2025–	Mačva Šabac	28	(0)
- * Club domestic league appearances and goals as of 16 August 2026

Vladimir Ilić (Serbian Cyrillic: Владимир Илић; born 24 February 1999) is a Serbian professional footballer who plays as a defender for Mačva Šabac.

== Club career ==
He spent his youth career with Intenacional Beograd. In summer 2018 he signed with Dinamo Vranje.
