= Marko Stojanović (footballer, born 1994) =

Serbian-German footballer

Personal information
- Date of birth: 31 May 1994 (age 32)
- Height: 1.89 m (6 ft 2 in)
- Position: Forward

Team information
- Current team: Wuppertaler SV
- Number: 26

Youth career
- 2010–2013: Fortuna Köln

Senior career*
Years	Team	Apps	(Gls)
2014–2015	Fortuna Köln	5	(0)
2014–2015	Fortuna Köln II	6	(7)
2015–2016	VfL Leverkusen	13	(5)
2016–2017	SC Wiedenbrück	30	(3)
2016–2017	SC Wiedenbrück II	4	(0)
2017–2018	Schwarz-Weiß Rehden	25	(1)
2018–2019	SC Verl	26	(3)
2019–2022	Rot-Weiß Koblenz	81	(3)
2022–2025	1. FC Bocholt	61	(1)
2026–	Wuppertaler SV	15	(0)
- * Club domestic league appearances and goals as of 24 June 2026

Marko Stojanović (Serbian: Марко Стојановић; born 31 May 1994) is a Serbian-German footballer who plays as a forward for Wuppertaler SV.
