= Nikola Stojković =

Serbian footballer

Personal information
- Full name: Nikola Stojković
- Date of birth: 2 February 1995 (age 31)
- Place of birth: Smederevo, FR Yugoslavia
- Height: 1.81 m (5 ft 11 in)
- Position: Central midfielder

Team information
- Current team: Smederevo 1924
- Number: 8

Youth career
- Red Star Belgrade

Senior career*
Years	Team	Apps	(Gls)
2013–2015	Red Star Belgrade	1	(0)
2014–2015	→ BSK Borča (loan)	28	(3)
2015–2018	Metalac Gornji Milanovac	55	(0)
2018–2019	Zemun	15	(2)
2019–2020	Smederevo 1924	24	(3)
2020–2021	Dubočica	25	(0)
2022	Mauerwerk	12	(1)
2023–2024	Smederevo 1924	29	(1)
2024–2025	Dubočica	19	(0)
2025–	Smederevo 1924	23	(1)
- * Club domestic league appearances and goals as of 14 May 2026

Nikola Stojković (Serbian Cyrillic: Никола Стојковић; born 2 February 1995) is a Serbian football midfielder who plays for Smederevo 1924 in the Serbian First League.
