= 2019–20 Serbian First League =

Serbian First League
- Season: 2019–20
- Champions: Zlatibor
- Promoted: Zlatibor; Metalac; Bačka; Novi Pazar
- Relegated: Sinđelić; Smederevo 1924
- Matches: 240
- Goals: 516 (2.15 per match)
- Top goalscorer: Aleksandar Katanić (19)
- Biggest home win: Radnički 1923 5–1 Sinđelić; Žarkovo 4–0 Budućnost; Radnički Pirot 4–0 Smederevo 1924; Bačka 4–0 Novi Pazar
- Biggest away win: Sinđelić 0–5 Grafičar
- Highest scoring: Radnički 1923 5–1 Sinđelić; Zlatibor 4–2 Sinđelić; Metalac 4–2 Sinđelić; Grafičar 4–2 Dinamo; Smederevo 1924 3–3 Žarkovo; Novi Pazar 2–4 Žarkovo
- Longest winning run: Zlatibor 5 games
- Longest unbeaten run: Kabel 12 games
- Longest winless run: Budućnost 14 games
- Longest losing run: Smederevo 1924 7 games

The 2019–20 Serbian First League was the 15th season of the Serbian First League since its establishment.

== 2019–20 league format ==
In 2019–20 season 16 teams competed in regular season. At the end of regular season top 8 teams were supposed to play promotion playoff round, while 8 lowest placed teams were supposed to play in the relegation playoff round. At the end of relegation playoff four bottom placed teams will be relegated to the Serbian League. At the end of promotion playoff round two top placed teams will earn promotion into Serbian SuperLiga, while third and fourth placed teams will play additional two round promotion playoff games against thirteen and fourteen placed teams from 2019–20 Serbian SuperLiga.

== Team changes ==
The following teams have changed division since the 2018–19 season.

=== To First League ===
Promoted from Serbian League

- Grafičar
- Radnički Pirot
- Kabel
- Smederevo 1924
- Kolubara (Note: Bežanija and Borac were relegated due to financial issues. Their places was taken by Kolubara who was promoted from Serbian League Belgrade and Novi Pazar who avoided relegation.)

Relegated from 2018–19 Serbian SuperLiga

- Dinamo
- Zemun
- Bačka

=== From First League ===
Relegated to Serbian League

- Bečej 1918
- Teleoptik
- Sloboda
- Bežanija
- Borac

Promoted to 2019–20 Serbian SuperLiga

- TSC
- Javor
- Inđija

== Teams ==
Location of the 2019–20 Serbian First League teams
Locations of the 2019–20 Serbian First League teams on the territory of Belgrade

Team	City	Stadium	Capacity
Bačka	Bačka Palanka	Stadion Slavko Maletin Vava	4,000
Budućnost Dobanovci	Belgrade	Stadion FK Budućnost	1,000
Dinamo Vranje	Vranje	Surdulica City Stadium	3,312
Grafičar	Belgrade	Topčiderska zvezda	1,000
Kabel	Novi Sad	Stadion FK Kabel	2,000
Kolubara	Lazarevac	Stadion FK Kolubara	2,500
Metalac	Gornji Milanovac	Stadion Metalac	4,400
Novi Pazar	Novi Pazar	Gradski Stadion	13,000
Radnički 1923	Kragujevac	Čika Dača	15,100
Radnički Pirot	Pirot	Stadion Dragan Nikolić	13,816
Sinđelić	Belgrade	Stadion FK Sinđelić	1,500
Smederevo 1924	Smederevo	Smederevo Stadium	17,200
Trayal	Kruševac	Stadion FK Trayal	1,500
Žarkovo	Belgrade	Stadion FK Žarkovo	610
Zemun	Belgrade	Zemun Stadium	9,588
Zlatibor	Čajetina	Stadion Švajcarija	1,040

== Transfers ==
For the list of transfers involving First League clubs during 2019–20 season, please see: List of Serbian football transfers summer 2019, List of Serbian football transfers winter 2019–20.

== Regular season ==
=== League table ===
Pos	Team	Pld	W	D	L	GF	GA	GD	Pts	Qualification
1	Zlatibor	30	14	12	4	33	18	+15	54 (Note: Head-to-head points: Zlatibor 4, Grafičar 1.)	Promotion to the Serbian SuperLiga
2	Grafičar (Note: Graficar decided to reject promotion to SuperLiga.)	30	16	6	8	49	27	+22	54	
3	Bačka	30	16	5	9	40	26	+14	53 (Note: Head-to-head away goals: Metalac G.M. 1, Bačka 0.)	Promotion to the Serbian SuperLiga
4	Metalac Gornji Milanovac	30	16	5	9	41	34	+7	53	Promotion to the Serbian SuperLiga
5	Kolubara	30	13	8	9	35	25	+10	47	
6	Radnički Pirot	30	12	7	11	34	33	+1	43	
7	Kabel	30	14	10	6	31	20	+11	42 (Note: Head-to-head points: Kabel 6, Radnički 1923 0.) (Note: Kabel were deducted 10 points due to match fixing.)	
8	Radnički 1923	30	11	9	10	31	26	+5	42	
9	Žarkovo	30	10	10	10	35	36	−1	40 (Note: Head-to-head points: Žarkovo 4, Novi Pazar 1.)	
10	Novi Pazar (Note: Novi Pazar promotion to SuperLiga, after Graficar rejected.)	30	11	7	12	32	31	+1	40	Promotion to the Serbian SuperLiga
11	Dinamo	30	10	7	13	34	38	−4	37	
12	Zemun	30	8	9	13	25	29	−4	33	
13	Trayal	30	7	10	13	21	30	−9	31	
14	Sinđelić Beograd (Note: Sinđelić were relegated due to financial issues.)	30	6	7	17	27	55	−28	25	Relegation to Serbian League
15	Budućnost	30	5	7	18	21	41	−20	22 (Note: Head-to-head points: Budućnost 6, Smederevo 1924 0.)	
16	Smederevo 1924 (Note: Smederevo relegation to Serbian League due to match fixing.)	30	9	5	16	27	47	−20	22 (Note: Smederevo 1924 were deducted 10 points due to match fixing.)	Relegation to Serbian League

Source: Prva Liga (in Serbian), Soccerway
Rules for classification: 1) Points; 2) Head-to-head points; 3) Head-to-head goal difference; 4) Head-to-head goals scored; 5) Head-to-head away goals scored (if two teams tied); 6) Goal difference; 7) Goals scored; 8) Fair play ranking; 9) Draw.

=== Results ===
Home \ Away	BAČ	BDO	DVR	GRA	KBL	KOL	MET	NPZ	RDK	RDP	SIN	SMD	TRA	ŽAR	ZEM	ZLA
Bačka		2–1	2–0	2–2	2–1	0–2	3–1	4–0	1–1	3–0	3–2	3–0	1–0	0–2	1–0	1–0
Budućnost	1–1		0–1	2–2	0–1	0–0	0–1	1–0	2–1	1–1	2–0	3–1	0–1	0–1	1–1	1–2
Dinamo	2–1	2–0		1–4	1–0	2–3	2–3	0–0	1–0	2–1	4–1	3–1	0–0	2–2	0–2	0–0
Grafičar	0–0	2–0	4–2		0–1	3–0	2–1	1–0	0–2	3–1	1–0	3–1	3–1	1–0	1–0	0–2
Kabel	1–1	0–0	1–0	1–1		0–0	3–1	2–1	3–2	0–0	1–0	0–1	2–0	0–0	2–0	0–0
Kolubara	1–0	0–0	0–1	3–1	1–2		3–0	3–1	1–0	1–0	2–1	2–1	2–1	0–0	0–0	1–2
Metalac Gornji Milanovac	2–0	1–0	3–2	0–0	1–3	2–1		2–0	0–0	1–0	4–2	0–1	1–0	2–0	1–0	1–1
Novi Pazar	0–1	2–0	3–0	1–0	3–1	0–0	2–1		1–1	2–0	0–1	3–1	3–1	2–4	2–1	2–0
Radnički 1923	2–1	1–0	0–4	3–2	0–1	0–0	1–2	0–1		3–0	5–1	3–0	0–0	2–2	1–0	1–0
Radnički Pirot	3–0	2–0	1–0	0–3	0–1	1–1	2–1	1–1	1–0		1–0	4–0	2–1	2–3	2–1	1–1
Sinđelić Beograd	0–2	3–2	1–0	0–5	1–1	1–3	1–2	1–1	0–0	1–1		1–3	0–0	0–1	2–1	2–1
Smederevo 1924	0–1	0–2	2–1	1–2	2–1	0–3	0–1	1–0	0–1	1–0	0–0		1–2	3–3	2–1	0–0
Trayal	0–2	2–1	2–0	1–0	1–1	2–1	1–1	1–0	0–1	0–1	0–0	0–0		0–0	1–1	1–2
Žarkovo	1–0	4–0	0–0	0–3	0–1	2–1	1–3	0–0	2–0	1–3	2–3	1–2	1–1		0–1	0–3
Zemun	0–2	3–1	0–0	1–0	1–0	1–0	2–2	1–1	0–0	0–2	3–0	1–1	2–1	0–1		1–1
Zlatibor	1–0	3–0	1–1	0–0	0–0	1–0	1–0	1–0	0–0	1–1	4–2	2–1	1–0	1–1	1–0	

Source: Prva liga (in Serbian)
Legend: Blue = home team win; Yellow = draw; Red = away team win.
For upcoming matches, an "a" indicates there is an article about the rivalry between the two participants.

== Individual statistics ==
=== Top scorers ===
As of matches played on 20 June 2020.

Pos	Scorer	Teams	Goals
1	(Serbia) Aleksandar Katanić	Metalac	19
2	(Serbia) Dimitrije Pobulić	Radnički Pirot / Grafičar	14
3	(Serbia) Slađan Nikodijević	Radnički 1923	11
3	(Serbia) Dejan Đenić	Kolubara	11
3	(Serbia) Krsta Đorđević	Bačka	11

=== Hat-tricks ===
Player	For	Against	Result	Date
(Serbia) Dejan Đenić	Kolubara	Smederevo 1924	3–0	10 August 2019
(Serbia) Aleksandar Katanić	Metalac	Dinamo	3–2	18 August 2019
(Montenegro) Filip Kukuličić	Grafičar	Radnički Pirot	3–1	15 September 2019
(Serbia) Željko Gavrić	Grafičar	Dinamo	4–2	29 September 2019
(Serbia) Nikola Nedeljković	Zlatibor	Sinđelić	4–2	7 March 2020
(Serbia) Krsta Đorđević	Bačka	Novi Pazar	4–0	6 June 2020
