= Andrija Ratković =

Serbian footballer

Personal information
- Full name: Andrija Ratković
- Date of birth: 14 November 1997 (age 28)
- Place of birth: Belgrade, FR Yugoslavia
- Height: 1.92 m (6 ft 4 in)
- Position: Forward

Team information
- Current team: Neman Grodno
- Number: 7

Youth career
- Šumadija Aranđelovac
- Radnički Kragujevac
- Javor Ivanjica

Senior career*
Years	Team	Apps	(Gls)
2014–2016	Javor Ivanjica	10	(2)
2015	→ Sloga Požega (loan)	5	(1)
2016	→ Radnički Obrenovac (loan)	6	(2)
2017	Karađorđe Topola		
2017–2018	Metalac GM	8	(0)
2018	→ Šumadija Aranđelovac (loan)		
2018–2019	Radnički 1923	16	(3)
2019	Písek	7	(0)
2019	Proleter Novi Sad	4	(0)
2019–2020	Kolubara	5	(0)
2020–2022	Borac Čačak	26	(5)
2022	Radnički SM	5	(1)
2022	Metalac GM	17	(0)
2023	Rad	15	(2)
2023–2024	Radnički Obrenovac		
2024–2025	Zemun	30	(5)
2025	Sloven Ruma		
2026	Dubočica	13	(2)
2026–	Neman Grodno	3	(1)
- * Club domestic league appearances and goals as of 29 August 2026

Andrija Ratković (Serbian Cyrillic: Андрија Ратковић; born 14 November 1997) is a Serbian footballer who plays as a forward for Neman Grodno.

== Club career ==
=== Javor Ivanjica ===
Born in Belgrade, Ratković played for Šumadija Aranđelovac and Radnički Kragujevac in youth categories, before he joined Javor Ivanjica. As a youth forward, he collected 6 First League caps usually as the substitution and scored 1 goal for the 2014–15 season. He also spent a period on trial with AEK during the season. For the 2015–16 season, Ratković was licensed for the Serbian SuperLiga, and also loaned to Serbian League West team Sloga Požega on dual registration. He made his SuperLiga debut in the 16th fixture of 2015–16 season, played on 31 October 2015. During the same season, Ratković collected 4 and 2 cup matches and scored 1 goal. In summer 2016, Ratković moved to Radnički Obrenovac on six-month loan. After the loan ended, he terminated the contract with Javor and left the club.

=== Other clubs ===
In 2017, he joined Karađorđe Topola. He played there until August 2017, where he joined Metalac. In February 2018, he was loaned out to Šumadija Aranđelovac for the rest of the season. In August 2018 he left Metalac and joined Radnički 1923.

In March 2019, Ratković joined Czech club FC Písek for a half year.

== Career statistics ==
As of 13 December 2016

Club	Season	League			Cup		Continental		Other		Total	
Club	Season	Division	Apps	Goals	Apps	Goals	Apps	Goals	Apps	Goals	Apps	Goals
Javor Ivanjica	2014–15	Serbian First League	6	1	0	0	—		—		6	1
Javor Ivanjica	2015–16	Serbian SuperLiga	4	0	2	0	—		—		6	1
Javor Ivanjica	2016–17	Serbian SuperLiga	0	0	0	0	—		—		0	0
Javor Ivanjica	Total		10	2	2	0	—		—		12	2
Sloga Požega (loan)	2015–16	Serbian League West	5	1	—		—		—		5	1
Radnički Obrenovac (loan)	2016–17	Serbian League Belgrade	6	2	—		—		—		6	2
Career total			21	5	2	0	—		—		23	5
