= Vasilije Bakić =

Serban footballer (born 2000)

Personal information
- Date of birth: 24 May 2000 (age 26)
- Place of birth: Belgrade, Serbia
- Height: 1.92 m (6 ft 4 in)
- Position: Centre back

Team information
- Current team: Zemun
- Number: 66

Youth career
- –2019: Čukarički

Senior career*
Years	Team	Apps	(Gls)
2019	Čukarički	0	(0)
2019–2020	Voždovac	3	(0)
2020–2021	Inđija	24	(1)
2021–2023	Kolubara	53	(3)
2023–2024	Radnički Niš	14	(0)
2024–2025	Shamakhi	23	(1)
2025	Ilves	2	(0)
2026–	Zemun	3	(0)

International career
- Serbia U17
- * Club domestic league appearances and goals as of 14 May 2026

Vasilije Bakić (Serbian: Василије Бакић; born 24 May 2000) is a Serbian professional footballer who plays as a centre back for Zemun.

== Club career ==
Bakić started football in his hometown Belgrade with Čukarički.

He made his senior debut in Serbian SuperLiga with Voždovac in 2019. Later he played for Inđija, Kolubara and Radnički Niš in his native Serbia, before joining Shamakhi in Azerbaijan Premier League in 2024.

On 8 August 2025, Bakić signed with Ilves in Finnish Veikkausliiga.

== Career statistics ==
As of 6 August 2025

Appearances and goals by club, season and competition
Club	Season	League			National cup (Note: Includes Serbian Cup and Azerbaijan Cup)		Europe		Total	
Club	Season	Division	Apps	Goals	Apps	Goals	Apps	Goals	Apps	Goals
Čukarički	2018–19	Serbian SuperLiga	0	0	0	0	–		0	0
Voždovac	2019–20	Serbian SuperLiga	3	0	1	0	–		4	0
Inđija	2020–21	Serbian SuperLiga	24	1	1	0	–		25	1
Kolubara	2021–22	Serbian SuperLiga	24	3	3	0	–		27	3
Kolubara	2022–23	Serbian SuperLiga	29	0	1	0	–		30	0
Kolubara	Total		53	3	4	0	0	0	57	3
Radnički Niš	2023–24	Serbian SuperLiga	14	0	2	0	–		16	0
Shamakhi	2024–25	Azerbaijan Premier League	23	1	2	0	–		25	1
Ilves	2025	Veikkausliiga	2	0	0	0	0	0	0	0
Career total			117	5	10	0	0	0	127	5
