= Milosav Sićović =

Serbian footballer

Personal information
- Date of birth: 12 November 1999 (age 27)
- Place of birth: Zemun, FR Yugoslavia
- Height: 1.78 m (5 ft 10 in)
- Position: Midfielder

Team information
- Current team: Budućnost Dobanovci

Youth career
- –2018: Internacional Beograd

Senior career*
Years	Team	Apps	(Gls)
2018–2019	Dinamo Vranje	12	(0)
2019	Kabel	0	(0)
2019	Sinđelić Beograd	16	(1)
2020	Radnički Niš	2	(0)
2020–2021	BASK		
2021	Drina Zvornik	14	(1)
2021	Brodarac		
2021	Zlatibor Čajetina	4	(0)
2022	Brodarac		
2022	Radnički Beograd		
2023	Stepojevac Vaga		
2023–	Budućnost Dobanovci		
- * Club domestic league appearances and goals as of 6 October 2021

Milosav Sićović (Serbian Cyrillic: Милосав Сићовић; born 12 November 1999) is a Serbian football midfielder who plays for Budućnost Dobanovci.

== Club career ==
After he spent his youth career with Internacional Beograd, in summer 2018 he signed with Dinamo Vranje. Sićović made his official debut for Dinamo Vranje in 1 fixture match of the 2018–19 Serbian SuperLiga season against Red Star.

== Career statistics ==
=== Club ===
As of 26 November 2018

Appearances and goals by club, season and competition
Club	Season	League			Cup		Continental		Other		Total	
Club	Season	Division	Apps	Goals	Apps	Goals	Apps	Goals	Apps	Goals	Apps	Goals
Dinamo Vranje	2018–19	SuperLiga	9	0	0	0	0	0	—		9	0
Career total			9	0	0	0	1	0	—		9	0
