= Nebojša Ivančević =

Serbian/Croatian footballer

Personal information
- Date of birth: 1 September 1994 (age 32)
- Place of birth: Vojnić, Krajina
- Height: 1.83 m (6 ft 0 in)
- Position: Forward

Team information
- Current team: Göfis
- Number: 10

Youth career
- Radnički Nova Pazova

Senior career*
Years	Team	Apps	(Gls)
2012–2016	Radnički Nova Pazova	70	(7)
2014	→ Jedinstvo Stara Pazova		
2017	Montana	5	(0)
2018–2019	Inđija	44	(4)
2019–2020	Radnički 1923	8	(0)
2020–2021	Budućnost Dobanovci	16	(2)
2021	Bačka Palanka	7	(0)
2021	Drava Ptuj	8	(1)
2022	Ripensia Timișoara	6	(0)
2022	Omladinac NB		
2023	Hard	10	(5)
2023-	Göfis	21	(11)
- * Club domestic league appearances and goals as of 15:25, 23 June 2022 (UTC)

Nebojša Ivančević (Serbian Cyrillic: Небојша Иванчевић; born 1 September 1994) is a Serbian/Croatian footballer who plays as a forward for Austrian side Göfis.

== Career ==
Born in Vojnić, Republic of Serbian Krajina, nowadays Croatia, he played with Serbian lower-league side Radnički Nova Pazova.

In January 2017, Ivančević signed a 3-year contract with Bulgarian First League side Montana. On 12 February 2017, he made his professional debut in a 0–4 home loss against Ludogorets Razgrad, coming on as a substitute for Steven Petkov. On 7 September 2017, his contract was terminated by mutual consent.

During the winter-break of 2017–18 he joined Serbian First League side Inđija.
