= Luka Sinđić =

Serbian footballer

Luka Sinđić Лука Синђић
Personal information
- Full name: Luka Sinđić
- Date of birth: 19 September 1993 (age 33)
- Place of birth: Belgrade, FR Jugoslavia
- Height: 1.84 m (6 ft 0 in)
- Position: Midfielder

Team information
- Current team: Avezzano
- Number: 8

Youth career
- Jedinstvo Ub

Senior career*
Years	Team	Apps	(Gls)
2009–2011	Jedinstvo Ub	43	(2)
2011	Srem	12	(1)
2012	Kolubara	14	(0)
2012–2013	Zemun	17	(2)
2013–2014	Francavilla	20	(2)
2014	→ Turbina Vreoci (loan)	9	(0)
2015	Donji Srem	12	(0)
2015	Slavija Sarajevo	2	(0)
2016	Kolubara	21	(2)
2017	Novi Pazar	9	(0)
2017–2018	Maccabi Herzliya	7	(1)
2018–2019	Vojvodina	0	(0)
2018	→ ČSK Čelarevo (loan)	14	(0)
2019	Zemun	7	(0)
2019	Sinđelić Beograd	5	(0)
2019–2021	Audace Cerignola	9	(0)
2021–2022	Melfi		
2022–2024	Montefano		
2024–2025	Montegranaro		
2026–	Avezzano		
- * Club domestic league appearances and goals

Luka Sinđić (Serbian Cyrillic: Лука Синђић; born 19 September 1993) is a Serbian football midfielder, playing for Italian club Forza e Coraggio Avezzano.
