= Miloš Šaka =

Serbian footballer

Personal information
- Full name: Miloš Šaka
- Date of birth: 12 April 1994 (age 32)
- Place of birth: Belgrade, FR Yugoslavia
- Height: 1.83 m (6 ft 0 in)
- Position: Midfielder

Team information
- Current team: Kačer Belanovica

Youth career
- Bežanija
- 2005–2011: Partizan

Senior career*
Years	Team	Apps	(Gls)
2011–2013	Teleoptik	40	(1)
2013–2015	Bežanija	38	(1)
2015–2016	Brodarac	21	(6)
2017–2019	Žarkovo	52	(4)
2019–2020	Rad	17	(4)
2020	Aluminij	13	(0)
2020–2021	Jedinstvo Ub		
2023-	FK Kačer Belanovica		

International career
	Serbia U16	9	(4)
2009–2011	Serbia U17	18	(7)
- Serbia U19
- * Club domestic league appearances and goals as of 15 September 2019

Miloš Šaka (Serbian Cyrillic: Милош Шака; born 12 April 1994) is a Serbian footballer who plays as a midfielder for FK Kačer Belanovica.

== Club career ==
After playing in the youth categories of Partizan, Šaka made his senior debut with Teleoptik. In the summer of 2013, he moved to Bežanija. After two seasons at Bežanija, Šaka left the club in the summer of 2015.

In September 2020, Šaka joined FK Jedinstvo Ub.

== International career ==
In October 2009, Šaka made his Serbia under-17 debut in the qualification round for the 2010 UEFA European Championship. In May 2011, he was part of the same team at the 2011 UEFA European Championship, which the country hosted, but didn't make any appearance due to ankle injury.
