= Konstantinos Galeadis =

Greek footballer

Personal information
- Date of birth: 21 August 1999 (age 27)
- Place of birth: Thessaloniki, Greece
- Height: 1.75 m (5 ft 9 in)
- Position: Forward

Team information
- Current team: Aiolikos
- Number: 30

Youth career
- 2017–2018: AEL

Senior career*
Years	Team	Apps	(Gls)
2018–2019	Nuorese		
2019–2020	Radnički Pirot	3	(0)
2020–2022	Karaiskakis	31	(0)
2022–2023	Irodotos	3	(0)
2023–	Apollon Pontus	2	(0)
- * Club domestic league appearances and goals as of 15 June 2023 ‡ National team caps and goals as of 30 July 2018

Konstantinos Galeadis (Greek: Κωνσταντίνος Γαλεάδης; born 21 August 1999) is a Greek professional footballer who plays as a forward for Super League 2 club Aiolikos.

== Career ==
Born in Thessaloniki, he played with youth team of AEL. He then moved to Italy and joined Nuorese Calcio. In summer 2019 he joined FK Radnički Pirot and debuted in Serbian First League.
