= Miloš Krstić (footballer, born 1987) =

Serbian footballer

Personal information
- Date of birth: 7 March 1987 (age 39)
- Place of birth: Svrljig, SFR Yugoslavia
- Position: Midfielder

Youth career
- Partizan
- Čukarički
- Radnički Niš

Senior career*
Years	Team	Apps	(Gls)
2005–2007	Rad	38	(5)
2007–2009	Marseille	0	(0)
2009	→ Ajaccio (loan)	7	(0)
2009–2012	OFK Beograd	51	(4)
2012	Jagodina	15	(7)
2012–2014	Thun	21	(0)
2014	→ Radnički Niš (loan)	11	(1)
2014	Nea Salamina	11	(2)
2015	Diósgyőr	8	(1)
2015	Radnički Niš	7	(0)
2016	Rad	10	(0)
2017	Novi Pazar	13	(1)
2017–2018	OFK Beograd	30	(13)
2018–2020	Sinđelić Beograd	40	(3)
2020–2021	OFK Beograd		
2021-2022	FC Affoltern		
- * Club domestic league appearances and goals

Miloš Krstić (born 7 March 1987) is a Serbian retired footballer who played as a midfielder.

== Club career ==
=== Early career ===
Krstić first began training with Partizan's youth academy before moving to Čukarički's youth team. In 2005, having played in Čukarički's youth system, Krstić trialled with Chelsea as an 18-year-old, although did not sign a contract with them. Krstić made his professional debut with FK Rad after which he signed for Olympique de Marseille in 2007. Initially he succeeded in Marseille's reserve side and was recognized as a good prospect. He was loaned out to Ajaccio in 2008, with whom he appeared in seven Ligue 2 matches.

=== OFK Beograd ===
In 2009, Krstić returned to Serbia and signed with OFK Beograd. He played in one of the most accomplished generation of OFK players in recent years, as the team finished in third place only behind Partizan and Red Star at the end of the 2009-10 season. In the summer of 2011, he became a transfer target of Red Star Belgrade.

=== Jagodina ===
On January 25, 2012, Krstić signed for FK Jagodina on a two-year contract. Krstić scored a total of seven goals in the Jelen SuperLiga while with Jagodina. He only played for a half-season up to summer of 2012, when it was announced that Krstić travelled to South Korea to respond to offers from Incheon United FC, Suwon Samsung Bluewings, and Daegu FC.

=== Thun ===
On June 29, 2012, he signed for FC Thun on a three-year contract, with an undisclosed fee paid to FK Jagodina. Before making his season debut he broke his fibula and had to wait until the winter to return to competition form.

=== Radnički Niš ===
Krstić signed for FK Radnički Niš on February 5, 2014.

=== Nea Salamina ===
On August 30, 2014 he signed for Nea Salamina.

=== Return to OFK Beograd ===
In January 2020, Krstić returned to OFK Beograd for the third time.

He last played for Swiss side FC Affoltern.
