= Drago Milović =

Montenegrin footballer

Personal information
- Date of birth: 23 May 1994 (age 32)
- Place of birth: Budva, FR Yugoslavia
- Height: 1.98 m (6 ft 6 in)
- Position: Forward

Team information
- Current team: OFK Bačka
- Number: 25

Senior career*
Years	Team	Apps	(Gls)
2013	Arsenal Tivat		
2014–2015	Mogren	6	(1)
2017	Hajduk Bar		
2017–2018	Amkar Perm	0	(0)
2018	TPS	12	(1)
2018–2019	Grbalj	1	(0)
2019	Žarkovo	3	(0)
2019	Kabel Novi Sad	1	(0)
2019–	OFK Bačka	0	(0)
- * Club domestic league appearances and goals as of 17:14, 17 January 2020 (UTC)

Drago Milović (born 23 May 1994) is a Montenegrin professional footballer who plays for Serbian club OFK Bačka, as a forward.

== Career ==
Born in Budva, Milović has played for Mogren, Amkar Perm, TPS, Grbalj and Žarkovo.
