= Petar Ćirković =

Serbian footballer

Personal information
- Full name: Petar Ćirković
- Date of birth: 19 November 1999 (age 26)
- Place of birth: Kuršumlija, FR Yugoslavia
- Height: 1.73 m (5 ft 8 in)
- Position: Full-back

Team information
- Current team: Loznica
- Number: 18

Youth career
- Kosanica
- 2015–2018: Radnički Niš

Senior career*
| Years | Team | Apps | (Gls) |
| 2018–2022 | Radnički Niš | 48 | (0) |
| 2018–2019 | → Radnički Pirot (loan) | 37 | (4) |
| 2022–2024 | IMT | 57 | (0) |
| 2024–2025 | Napredak Kruševac | 7 | (0) |
| 2025– | Loznica | 32 | (2) |
- * Club domestic league appearances and goals as of 14 May 2026

Petar Ćirković (Serbian Cyrillic: Петар Ћирковић; born 19 November 1999) is a Serbian footballer who plays as a defender for Loznica.

== Club career ==
Ćirković passed Kosanica youth categories, and also spent three years in Radnički youth categories. On 14 February 2018, Ćirković signed a five-year deal with Radnički Niš. His official debut for Radnički Niš in 23 fixture match of the 2017–18 Serbian SuperLiga season against Bačka, played on 18 February 2018, replacing Siniša Babić in 89 minutes.

== Career statistics ==
As of 7 August 2018

Appearances and goals by club, season and competition
| Club | Season | League | | | Cup | | Continental | | Other | | Total | |
| Club | Season | Division | Apps | Goals | Apps | Goals | Apps | Goals | Apps | Goals | Apps | Goals |
|---|---|---|---|---|---|---|---|---|---|---|---|---|
| Radnički Niš | 2017–18 | Serbian SuperLiga | 2 | 0 | 0 | 0 | 0 | 0 | — | | 2 | 0 |
| Radnički Niš | 2018–19 | Serbian SuperLiga | 1 | 0 | 0 | 0 | 1 | 0 | — | | 2 | 0 |
| Radnički Pirot (loan) | 2018–19 | Serbian League East | 0 | 0 | 0 | 0 | — | | — | | 0 | 0 |
| Career total | | | 3 | 0 | 0 | 0 | 1 | 0 | — | | 4 | 0 |
