= Faruk Bihorac =

Serbian professional footballer

Personal information
- Full name: Faruk Bihorac
- Date of birth: 12 May 1996 (age 30)
- Place of birth: Novi Pazar, FR Yugoslavia
- Height: 1.85 m (6 ft 1 in)
- Position: Centre-back

Team information
- Current team: Jošanica

Youth career
- 2006–2012: Novi Pazar

Senior career*
Years	Team	Apps	(Gls)
2012–2013	Novi Pazar	4	(0)
2014–2015	Hajduk Kula	3	(1)
2015–2019	Novi Pazar	37	(3)
2016	→ Železničar Lajkovac (loan)	13	(1)
2017	→ Jošanica (loan)	15	(1)
2019–2020	Kabel	20	(3)
2020–2021	Velež Mostar	12	(0)
2021	Kabel	11	(0)
2021–2022	Akademija Pandev	23	(3)
2022	Sileks	4	(0)
2023	Malisheva	17	(1)
2023–2024	Tuzla City	20	(1)
2024–2025	Trayal Kruševac	16	(0)
2025	Inđija	8	(0)
2025–2026	Bashkimi	8	(0)
2026–	Jošanica	0	(0)
- * Club domestic league appearances and goals as of 15 March 2026

Faruk Bihorac (Serbian Cyrillic: Фарук Бихорац; born 12 May 1996) is a Serbian professional footballer who plays as a centre-back for Serbian League West club Jošanica.

== Career ==
He has also played for Bosnian Premier League club Velež Mostar among other clubs. In January 2023 Bihorac joined Kosovan side Malisheva from Macedonian club Sileks and he was presented by Tuzla City as their new signing in summer 2023.
