= Luka Čermelj =

Serbian footballer (born 1995)

Personal information
- Full name: Luka Čermelj
- Date of birth: 29 July 1995 (age 31)
- Place of birth: Belgrade, FR Yugoslavia
- Height: 1.83 m (6 ft 0 in)
- Position: Defensive midfielder

Team information
- Current team: Turan
- Number: 4

Youth career
- OFK Beograd

Senior career*
Years	Team	Apps	(Gls)
2014	Sinđelić Beograd	2	(0)
2015	Brodarac 1947	7	(0)
2015–2017	IMT	48	(5)
2017–2019	Teleoptik	56	(4)
2019	Radnički Niš	0	(0)
2019–2020	Inđija	21	(0)
2021–2022	Sogdiana Jizzakh	50	(2)
2023	Navbahor Namangan	9	(0)
2024	Novi Pazar	3	(0)
2025–	Turan	9	(1)
- * Club domestic league appearances and goals as of 2 November 2025

Luka Čermelj (Serbian Cyrillic: Лука Чермељ; born 29 July 1995) is a Serbian professional footballer who plays as a defensive midfielder for Kazakhstan Premier League club Turan.

== Personal life ==
He is a son of former footballer Miroslav Čermelj and the older brother of footballer Filip Čermelj.
