= Filip Čermelj =

Serbian footballer (born 1998)

Personal information
- Date of birth: 28 September 1998 (age 28)
- Place of birth: Mérida, Spain
- Height: 1.79 m (5 ft 10 in)
- Position: Midfielder

Team information
- Current team: Bokelj

Youth career
- 2005–2009: OFK Beograd
- 2009–2016: Partizan

Senior career*
Years	Team	Apps	(Gls)
2016–2019	Partizan	0	(0)
2016–2019	→ Teleoptik (loan)	70	(8)
2019	Mačva Šabac	2	(0)
2020	Teleoptik		
2020–2021	Budućnost Dobanovci	14	(0)
2021–2023	Teleoptik		
2023	Omladinac NB		
2024–	Bokelj	1	(0)

International career
2014–2015	Serbia U17 (Note: Only official UEFA matches included)	4	(0)
- * Club domestic league appearances and goals as of 19 May 2024

Filip Čermelj (Serbian Cyrillic: Филип Чермељ; born 28 September 1998) is a Serbian professional footballer who plays as a midfielder for North Macedonia second-tier side Bokelj.

== Club career ==
Čermelj made his first footballing steps at OFK Beograd. He spent four years in the club's youth setup, before joining Partizan at the age of 10. In June 2015, Čermelj was one of the seven youngsters promoted to the senior squad at the start of preparations for the 2015–16 campaign. He was later sent back to the youth team to finish his formation.

In July 2016, Čermelj was loaned to affiliated side Teleoptik. He signed his first professional contract with Partizan on 31 January 2017, on a three-year deal. Afterwards, Čermelj continued to play regularly for Teleoptik and helped them win the Serbian League Belgrade in the 2016–17 season, thus earning promotion to the Serbian First League.

== International career ==
Čermelj represented Serbia at under-17 level, appearing in four games during the 2015 UEFA European Under-17 Championship qualifying stage.

== Personal life ==
Čermelj was born in Mérida, Spain, as his father, Miroslav, played for Extremadura at the time. His older brother, Luka, is also a footballer.

== Honours ==
Teleoptik

- Serbian League Belgrade: 2016–17
