= Yevhen Kovalenko =

Ukrainian footballer

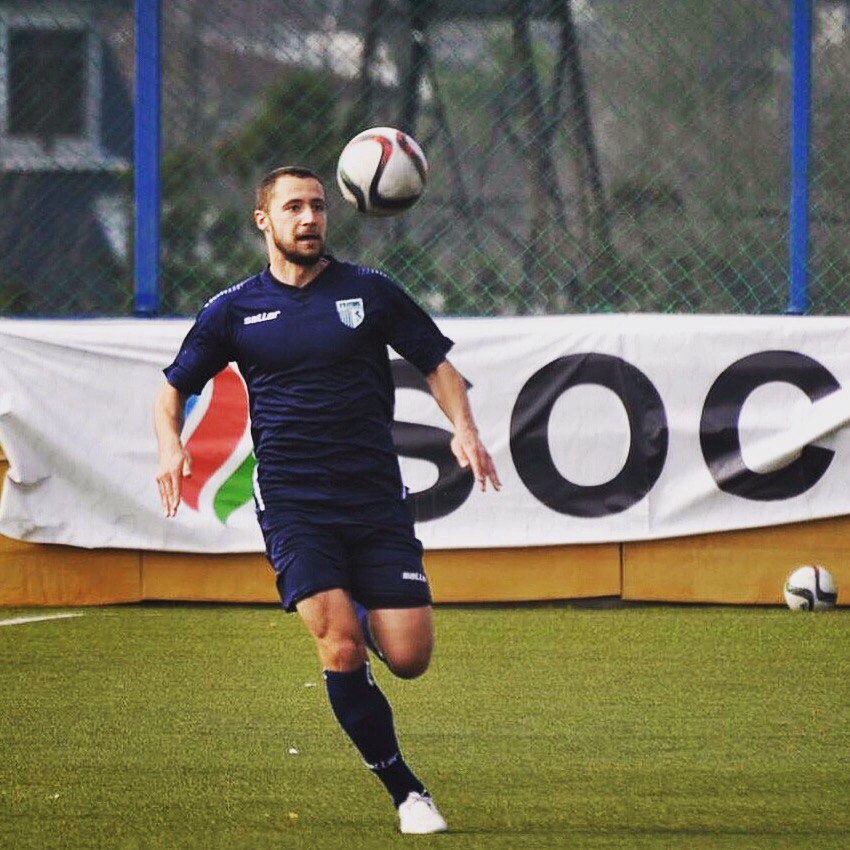

Personal information
- Full name: Yevhen Olehovych Kovalenko
- Date of birth: 11 August 1992 (age 34)
- Place of birth: Zaporizhzhia, Ukraine
- Height: 1.76 m (5 ft 9 1/2 in)
- Position: Midfielder

Team information
- Current team: Slavoj Trebišov

Youth career
- 2005–2009: Metalurh Zaporizhzhia

Senior career*
Years	Team	Apps	(Gls)
2009–2014	Metalurh Zaporizhzhia	0	(0)
2009–2012	→ Metalurh-2 Zaporizhzhia	37	(2)
2014–2015	Poltava	23	(0)
2015	Mykolaiv	2	(0)
2016	Zugdidi	10	(1)
2016	Avanhard Kramatorsk	11	(0)
2017	Hirnyk-Sport Horishni Plavni	29	(1)
2018	Kremin Kremenchuk	11	(0)
2018–2019	Žarkovo	27	(8)
2019	Rad	7	(0)
2020	Grbalj	12	(0)
2020	Mykolaiv	3	(0)
2020–2022	Metalurh Zaporizhzhia	32	(8)
2022–	Slavoj Trebišov	6	(0)
- * Club domestic league appearances and goals as of 23 May 2023

Yevhen Kovalenko (Ukrainian: Євген Олегович Коваленко; born 11 August 1992) is a Ukrainian football midfielder who plays for Slavoj Trebišov in 2. Liga (Slovakia).

== Career ==
Kovalenko is a product of the youth team system of FC Metalurh Zaporizhzhia. He played for FC Metalurh in the Ukrainian Premier League Reserves and then in the Ukrainian First League sides FC Poltava and MFK Mykolaiv. In January 2016 he signed a contract with Georgian FC Zugdidi from the Umaglesi Liga.

After playing back in Ukraine with Kremin Kremenchuk, Kovalenko moved again abroad in summer 2018, this time to Serbia to play with OFK Žarkovo.

In summer 2018 he moved abroad again, and signed with OFK Žarkovo in Serbian First League. After one season at Serbian second level, in following summer he signed with FK Rad playing in the Serbian SuperLiga.
