= Ousman Marong =

Gambian footballer

Personal information
- Full name: Ousman Marong
- Date of birth: 21 June 1999 (age 27)
- Place of birth: Kololi, The Gambia
- Height: 1.73 m (5 ft 8 in)
- Position: Midfielder

Youth career
- –2019: Superstars Academy
- 2017–2018: → Beitar Nes Tubruk

Senior career*
Years	Team	Apps	(Gls)
2019	Trayal Kruševac	14	(6)
2019–2021	Red Star Belgrade	0	(0)
2019–2020	→ Grafičar Beograd (loan)	26	(5)
2020–2021	→ Hapoel Ra'anana (loan)	15	(2)
2021	→ Grafičar Beograd (loan)	11	(2)
2021–2022	Akademija Pandev	31	(4)
2022–2023	Radnik Surdulica	11	(0)
2023	Voska Sport	14	(0)
2024–2025	Sileks	44	(4)
2025–2026	Concordia Chiajna	22	(0)
- * Club domestic league appearances and goals as of 9 May 2026

Ousman Marong (born 21 June 1999) is a Gambian professional footballer who plays as a midfielder.

== Club career ==
Born in Kololi, Marong started playing in Gambia at the Superstars Academy. They sent him on loan to Israeli club Beitar Nes Tubruk where he made 24 appearances and scored 9 goals in the 2017–18 Israeli youth league.

In the winter-break of the 2018–19 season, he signed with Serbian club Trayal Kruševac along his compatriot Lamin Jobe. Marong adapted immediately in Serbia, contributing with 6 goals in 14 appearances in the second half of the season. His performances called the attention of bigger clubs, and by June there were rumors he was going to sign with current Serbian champions, Red Star Belgrade.

== International career ==
Before arriving to Serbia, Marong had already been member of the Gambian U-23 national team.
