= Sava Radić =

Serbian footballer

Personal information
- Full name: Sava Radić
- Date of birth: 4 March 1998 (age 28)
- Place of birth: Niš, FR Yugoslavia
- Height: 1.81 m (5 ft 11 in)
- Positions: Right-back; centre-back

Team information
- Current team: Valletta
- Number: 55

Youth career
- –2013: Nacional Niš
- 2013–2017: Čukarički

Senior career*
Years	Team	Apps	(Gls)
2015–2019	Čukarički	10	(0)
2018–2019	→ Bečej (loan)	32	(0)
2019–2020	Trayal Kruševac	15	(0)
2020	Bačka Palanka	0	(0)
2020–2021	Dubočica	30	(0)
2021	Akademija Pandev	17	(1)
2022–2025	Struga	91	(6)
2025–	Valletta	29	(2)

International career
2013–2014	Serbia U16	10	(0)
2014–2015	Serbia U17	11	(0)
2015–2016	Serbia U18	9	(0)
2016–2017	Serbia U19	8	(0)
- * Club domestic league appearances and goals as of 7 May 2026

Sava Radić (Serbian Cyrillic: Сава Радић; born 4 March 1998) is a Serbian footballer who plays as a defender for Valletta in Maltese Premier League.

== Club career ==
=== Čukarički ===
Born in Niš, Sava played for youth selections of Nacional Niš. He moved to Čukarički as a cadet in 2013. After two years spent with youth team, Radić signed his first three-year professional contract with club at the beginning of December 2015. He also continued playing with youth team and was a member of generation which won Serbian youth league and promotion in 2016–17 UEFA Youth League. Radić made his senior debut in the 6th fixture match of the 2016–17 Serbian SuperLiga campaign against Vojvodina, played on 21 August 2016, when he performed as a right-back. While with youth setup, Radić collected 6 games as a senior in both domestic competitions until the end of 2016–17 season. After overgrowing youth team, Radić has permanently joined first squad in summer 2017, when he converted his squad number, being assigned number 2 jersey. On 18 April 2018, Radić scored own goal in the first leg of the semifinal cup match against Partizan, after which he was replaced by Stefan Veličković in second half.

== International career ==
Radić was a member of Serbia U16, U17 and U18 national football teams between 2013 and 2016. Radić was also called into Serbia U19 level for memorial tournament "Stevan Vilotić - Ćele" in August 2016. He played as a member of the selection until 2017.

== Career statistics ==
As of 18 April 2018

Appearances and goals by club, season and competition
Club	Season	League			Cup		Continental		Other		Total	
Club	Season	Division	Apps	Goals	Apps	Goals	Apps	Goals	Apps	Goals	Apps	Goals
Čukarički	2015–16	Serbian SuperLiga	0	0	0	0	0	0	—		0	0
Čukarički	2016–17	Serbian SuperLiga	5	0	1	0	0	0	—		6	0
Čukarički	2017–18	Serbian SuperLiga	5	0	2	0	—		—		7	0
Čukarički	Total		10	0	3	0	0	0	—		13	0
