= Luka Kačavenda =

Bosnian footballer

Personal information
- Full name: Luka Kačavenda
- Date of birth: 1 November 2001 (age 25)
- Place of birth: Prijedor, Bosnia and Herzegovina
- Height: 1.90 m (6 ft 3 in)
- Position: Goalkeeper

Team information
- Current team: Potkozarje Aleksandrovac
- Number: 1

Youth career
- –2017: Rudar Prijedor
- 2017–2019: Vojvodina
- 2019–2020: Partizan

Senior career*
Years	Team	Apps	(Gls)
2020	Radnik Bijeljina	0	(0)
2021	Olimpik Sarajevo	2	(0)
2021	Velež Mostar	7	(0)
2022–2023	Travnik	45	(0)
2023–2026	Kozara Gradiška	72	(0)
2026–	Potkozarje Aleksandrovac	2	(0)

International career
2017–2018	Bosnia and Herzegovina U17	9	(0)
2019	Bosnia and Herzegovina U18	1	(0)
2019	Bosnia and Herzegovina U19	2	(0)
- * Club domestic league appearances and goals as of 19 July 2021

Luka Kačavenda (born 1 November 2001) is a Bosnian professional footballer who plays as a goalkeeper for First League of the Republika Srpska club Potkozarje Aleksandrovac.

== Club career ==
Kačavenda made two appearances for Radnik Bijeljina in the 2020–21 Bosnian Cup, including a match against fellow Bosnian Premier League side Tuzla City, which finished as a 1–3 loss. On 23 January 2021, he joined Olimpik.

On 18 June 2021, Kačavenda signed a one-year contract with Velež Mostar. He debuted for Velež in a league game against Posušje on 19 July 2021.

== International career ==
Kačavenda represented Bosnia and Herzegovina on various youth levels.
