= Aleksandar Dimitrić =

Serbian footballer

Personal information
- Date of birth: 29 February 1996 (age 30)
- Place of birth: Loznica, FR Yugoslavia
- Height: 1.80 m (5 ft 11 in)
- Position: Forward

Team information
- Current team: Inđija
- Number: 22

Youth career
- Inđija

Senior career*
| Years | Team | Apps | (Gls) |
| 2013–2015 | Inđija | 35 | (4) |
| 2014 | → Ljukovo (loan) | | |
| 2016–2017 | Javor Ivanjica | 10 | (0) |
| 2016 | → Kolubara (loan) | 12 | (0) |
| 2018–2019 | Radnički 1923 | 14 | (1) |
| 2019 | OFK Bačka | 7 | (1) |
| 2020 | Radnički Sombor | | |
| 2021 | Feniks 1995 | | |
| 2021 | Mladost Novi Sad | 16 | (1) |
| 2022 | Feniks 1995 | | |
| 2022 | Jagodina | | |
| 2023 | Sloga Kraljevo | | |
| 2024-2025 | Hajduk 1912 | | |
| 2025- | Inđija | | |
- * Club domestic league appearances and goals as of 6 October 2021

Aleksandar Dimitrić (Serbian Cyrillic: Александар Димитрић; born 29 February 1996) is a Serbian football forward who plays for Inđija.

== Club career ==
=== Inđija ===
Born in Loznica, Dimitrić started his senior career with Inđija, and he made 6 appearances until the end of in the 2013–14 Serbian First League season, all as a back-up player. At the beginning of next season, Dimitrić was loaned to zone league club Ljukovo, where he spent 6 months. During the spring half of 2014–15 season, Dimitrić collected 14 appearances, usually in starting 11. He also scored 3 goals, 2 against Moravac Mrštane, and 1 against Mačva Šabac. For the first half of 2015–16 Serbian First League season, Dimitrić played all 15 fixtures scoring 1 goal, and also appeared in 2 cup matches.

=== Javor Ivanjica ===
Dimitrić signed a three-year contract with Javor Ivanjica in January 2016. He made his SuperLiga debut in a home match against Radnik Surdulica, played on 12 March 2016, under coach Mladen Dodić, replacing Marko Kolaković in 76 minute of match. Coach Miloš Veselinović gave a chance to Dimitrić at the beginning of 2016–17 Serbian SuperLiga season in starting 11, but later he moved on six-month loan to Kolubara in last days of summer transfer window 2016. In summer 2017, Dimitrić terminated a contract with Javor.

=== Radnički Sombor ===
In January 2020, Dimitrić moved to FK Radnički Sombor.

== Career statistics ==
As of 12 December 2016

| Club | Season | League | | | Cup | | Continental | | Other | | Total | |
| Club | Season | Division | Apps | Goals | Apps | Goals | Apps | Goals | Apps | Goals | Apps | Goals |
|---|---|---|---|---|---|---|---|---|---|---|---|---|
| Inđija | 2013–14 | Serbian First League | 6 | 0 | 0 | 0 | — | | — | | 6 | 0 |
| Inđija | 2014–15 | Serbian First League | 14 | 3 | 0 | 0 | — | | — | | 14 | 3 |
| Inđija | 2015–16 | Serbian First League | 15 | 1 | 2 | 0 | — | | — | | 17 | 1 |
| Inđija | Total | | 35 | 4 | 2 | 0 | — | | — | | 37 | 4 |
| Javor Ivanjica | 2015–16 | Serbian SuperLiga | 6 | 0 | 0 | 0 | — | | — | | 6 | 0 |
| Javor Ivanjica | 2016–17 | Serbian SuperLiga | 4 | 0 | — | | — | | — | | 4 | 0 |
| Javor Ivanjica | Total | | 10 | 0 | 0 | 0 | — | | — | | 10 | 4 |
| Kolubara (loan) | 2016–17 | Serbian First League | 12 | 0 | 1 | 0 | — | | — | | 13 | 0 |
| Career total | | | 57 | 4 | 3 | 0 | — | | — | | 60 | 4 |
