= Ivan Lučić (footballer, born 1996) =

Serbian footballer

Personal information
- Full name: Ivan Lučić
- Date of birth: 17 October 1996 (age 30)
- Place of birth: Prijepolje, FR Yugoslavia
- Height: 1.88 m (6 ft 2 in)
- Position: Goalkeeper

Team information
- Current team: Loznica

Youth career
- Zemun
- Zlatibor Čajetina
- Brodarac

Senior career*
Years	Team	Apps	(Gls)
2014	Polimlje		
2015	Zlatar Nova Varoš		
2016	Metalul Reșița	6	(0)
2016	Zlatibor Čajetina	8	(0)
2017	FAP	15	(0)
2017	Bačka Palanka	3	(0)
2018–2019	Spartak Subotica	5	(0)
2019	Smederevo	1	(0)
2019–2020	RSK Rabrovo		
2020	Smederevo	6	(0)
2020	Železničar Pančevo	4	(0)
2021	Dubočica	6	(0)
2021-2022	Zlatibor Čajetina	12	(0)
2022-	Loznica	5	(0)
- * Club domestic league appearances and goals as of 13:48, 16 January 2021 (UTC)

2021 Polimlje Prijepolje 2024 Fap Priboj

Ivan Lučić (Serbian Cyrillic: Иван Лучић; born 17 October 1996) is a Serbian footballer, who plays as a goalkeeper for Loznica.

== Club career ==
=== Early years ===
Born in Prijepolje, Lučić was with Zemun, Zlatibor Čajetina and Brodarac in early years of his football career. In summer 2014, Lučić returned to his home town and joined Polimlje. He also a short spell in 2015 with Zlatar Nova Varoš, playing in the Drina Zone League. In summer same year, Lučić left the club. At the beginning of 2016, Lučić joined Romanian side Metalul Reșița where he spent next six months, after which he rejoined Zlatibor Čajetina until the end of same year. He also played with FAP in early 2017, making 15 all appearances in the Serbian League West for the second half-season.

=== Bačka ===
In summer 2017, Lučić signed with the Serbian SuperLiga club OFK Bačka. Lučić made his professional debut for new club in a match against Vojvodina on 5 August 2017 under coach Dragan Ivanović. During the season, Lučić was usually used as a back-up choice for Nemanja Jevrić under manager Zvezdan Milošević. Lučić kept a clean sheet in first round match of the Serbian Cup, against Mačva Šabac. He was also named as a player of the match in 2–2 draw to Red Star Belgrade at the Slavko Maletin Vava Stadium on 2 December 2017.

=== Spartak Subotica ===
At the beginning of 2018, Lučić started training with the Serbian First League side Inđija, and he was planned to stay on loan deal until the end of the 2017–18 campaign. However, as the agreement failed, Lučić later moved to Spartak Subotica as a single player. The transfer had been announced on January 24, and confirmed by the club's president, Dragan Simović in February 2018. He officially promoted on 24 February 2018, penning a three-and-a-half-year deal with the club. Lučić made his debut for Spartak in 4–0 away defeat against Red Star Belgrade on 5 May 2018. He also played in the last fixture match of the season, against Partizan.

== Career statistics ==
As of 1 January 2019

Appearances and goals by club, season and competition
Club	Season	League			Cup		Continental		Other		Total	
Club	Season	Division	Apps	Goals	Apps	Goals	Apps	Goals	Apps	Goals	Apps	Goals
Metalul Reșița	2015–16	Liga II	6 (Note: Does not include 20 fixture match against Bihor Oradea, which was registered with an official result afterwards)	0	—		—		—		6	0
Zlatibor Čajetina	2016–17	Serbian League West	8	0	—		—		—		8	0
FAP	2016–17	Serbian League West	15	0	—		—		—		15	0
OFK Bačka	2017–18	Serbian SuperLiga	3	0	1	0	—		—		4	0
Spartak Subotica	2017–18	Serbian SuperLiga	2	0	—		—		—		2	0
Spartak Subotica	2018–19	Serbian SuperLiga	1	0	2	0	0	0	—		3	0
Spartak Subotica	Total		3	0	2	0	0	0	—		5	0
Career total			35	0	3	0	0	0	—		38	0
