= Kosta Dražić =

Serbian football player

Personal information
- Date of birth: 21 April 1998 (age 28)
- Place of birth: Subotica, FR Yugoslavia
- Height: 1.82 m (6 ft 0 in)
- Position: Forward

Team information
- Current team: SV Rehberg
- Number: 11

Youth career
- Vojvodina
- Mačva Šabac
- 2016–2017: Brodarac

Senior career*
| Years | Team | Apps | (Gls) |
| 2015–2016 | Mačva Šabac | 6 | (1) |
| 2017 | Budućnost Krušik | 9 | (1) |
| 2018–2019 | Bečej | 46 | (9) |
| 2019–2020 | Kabel | 22 | (2) |
| 2020–2021 | Loznica | 12 | (3) |
| 2021 | Zvijezda 09 | 10 | (2) |
| 2021 | Bečej | | |
| 2022 | SC Melk | 10 | (1) |
| 2022 | FK Tisa | | |
| 2023 | US Furth/Göttweig | 10 | (3) |
| 2023- | SV Rehberg | 26 | (20) |
- * Club domestic league appearances and goals as of 1 May 2021

Kosta Dražić (Serbian Cyrillic: Коста Дражић; born 21 April 1998) is a Serbian football forward who plays for Austrian lower league side SV Rehberg. He also played for Bečej.
