= Aleksandar Katanić =

Serbian footballer

Personal information
- Date of birth: 15 August 1995 (age 31)
- Place of birth: Loznica, FR Yugoslavia
- Height: 1.83 m (6 ft 0 in)
- Position: Forward

Team information
- Current team: Dinamo Jug
- Number: 30

Senior career*
Years	Team	Apps	(Gls)
2012–2014	Radnički Klupci	15	(3)
2014–2015	Loznica	26	(2)
2015–2017	Dunav Stari Banovci	57	(28)
2017	Teleoptik	5	(0)
2018	Dunav Stari Banovci	15	(19)
2018	Bačka	5	(0)
2019	Bežanija	10	(5)
2019–2021	Metalac Gornji Milanovac	61	(27)
2021	Mladost Lučani	12	(0)
2022	Honka	8	(0)
2022	Honka II	1	(1)
2022	Mladost Novi Sad	16	(0)
2023	Sileks	11	(4)
2023–2024	Balzan	21	(3)
2024	Pelister	7	(1)
2025	Swieqi United	8	(6)
2025	Arsenal Tivat	9	(0)
2026-	Dinamo Jug	11	(0)
- * Club domestic league appearances and goals as of 14 May 2026

Aleksandar Katanić (Serbian Cyrillic: Александар Катанић; born 15 August 1995) is a Serbian footballer who plays as a forward for Dinamo Jug.

== Club career ==
On 21 January 2022, Katanić signed with Honka in Finland. His contract with Honka was terminated by mutual consent on 5 July 2022.

== Career statistics ==
As of 23 October 2024

Appearances and goals by club, season and competition
Club	Season	League			National cup (Note: Includes Serbian Cup, Suomen Cup and Maltese FA Trophy)		League cup (Note: Includes Finnish League Cup)		Total	
Club	Season	Division	Apps	Goals	Apps	Goals	Apps	Goals	Apps	Goals
Radnički Klupci	2012–13	Serbian League West	15	3	—		—		15	3
Radnički Klupci	2013–14	Drina Zone League			—		—			
Radnički Klupci	Total		15	3	0	0	0	0	15	3
Loznica	2014–15	Serbian League West	26	2	—		—		26	2
Dunav Stari Banovci	2015–16	Serbian League Vojvodina	29	8	—		—		29	8
Dunav Stari Banovci	2016–17	Serbian League Vojvodina	28	20	—		—		28	20
Dunav Stari Banovci	Total		57	28	0	0	0	0	57	28
Teleoptik	2017–18	Serbian First League	5	0	—		—		5	0
Dunav Stari Banovci	2017–18	Serbian League Vojvodina	15	19	—		—		15	19
Bačka	2018–19	Serbian SuperLiga	5	0	0	0	—		5	0
Bežanija	2018–19	Serbian First League	10	5	0	0	—		10	5
Metalac Gornji Milanovac	2019–20	Serbian First League	29	19	1	0	—		30	19
Metalac Gornji Milanovac	2020–21	Serbian SuperLiga	31	8	1	0	—		32	8
Metalac Gornji Milanovac	2021–22	Serbian SuperLiga	1	0	0	0	—		1	0
Metalac Gornji Milanovac	Total		61	27	2	0	0	0	63	27
Mladost Lučani	2021–22	Serbian SuperLiga	12	0	0	0	—		12	0
Honka	2022	Veikkausliiga	8	0	1	0	4	2	13	2
Honka II	2022	Kakkonen	1	1	—		—		1	1
Mladost Novi Sad	2022–23	Serbian SuperLiga	16	0	0	0	—		16	0
Sileks	2023–24	Macedonian First League	11	4	0	0	—		11	4
Balzan	2023–24	Maltese Premier League	21	3	2	0	—		23	3
Pelister	2024–25	Macedonian First League	7	1	1	0	—		8	1
Career total			270	93	6	0	4	2	280	95

== Honours ==
Honka

- Finnish League Cup: 2022

Individual

- Serbian First League Top Scorer: 2019–20
- Serbian SuperLiga Player of the Week: 2020–21 (Round 5)
