= Marko Stojanović (footballer, born 1998) =

Serbian footballer

Personal information
- Date of birth: 1 February 1998 (age 28)
- Place of birth: Belgrade, FR Yugoslavia
- Height: 1.79 m (5 ft 10 in)
- Position: Attacking midfielder

Team information
- Current team: Umka

Youth career
- Rad

Senior career*
Years	Team	Apps	(Gls)
2017–2019	Rad	24	(0)
2019	→ OFK Vršac (loan)		
2019	Zlatibor Čajetina	18	(1)
2020	Smederevo	5	(0)
2020–2021	Slavia Mozyr	8	(0)
2021–2022	OFK Žarkovo	28	(1)
2022	BASK		
2023	Loznica	9	(0)
2023–	Umka		
- * Club domestic league appearances and goals as of 28 May 2023

Marko Stojanović (Serbian Cyrillic: Марко Стојановић; born 1 February 1998) is a Serbian professional footballer who plays as an attacking midfielder for Umka.

== Career ==
On 26 January 2019, OFK Vršac announced that they had signed Stojanović on loan. Ahead of the 2019/20 season, he then joined FK Zlatibor Čajetina.
