= Dejan Đenić =

Serbian footballer

Personal information
- Date of birth: June 2, 1986 (age 40)
- Place of birth: Čačak, SFR Yugoslavia
- Height: 1.81 m (5 ft 11 in)
- Position: Forward

Senior career*
Years	Team	Apps	(Gls)
2004–2005	Remont Čačak	5	(0)
2006	Drava Ptuj	1	(0)
2006	Heerenveen B	11	(2)
2007	Novi Pazar	16	(3)
2007	Standard Bakı	6	(0)
2008	Sloga Kraljevo	9	(1)
2008	Jedinstvo Bijelo Polje	13	(2)
2009	ŁKS Łódź	10	(1)
2010	Bežanija	11	(6)
2010–2013	Jagodina	70	(10)
2013	Ekranas	11	(2)
2014	Borac Čačak	25	(4)
2015	Metalac	31	(3)
2016	Bokelj	14	(8)
2016–2017	Rad	23	(5)
2017–2018	Zemun	16	(3)
2018–2019	Spartak Subotica	26	(3)
2019–2022	Kolubara	78	(21)
- * Club domestic league appearances and goals as of 14 June 2024

Dejan Đenić (Serbian Cyrillic: Дejaн Ђeнић: also transliterated Dejan Djenić; born 2 June 1986) is a Serbian retired footballer.

== Career ==
Dejan Đenić started his career in his hometown club FK Remont Čačak in the 4th league. In his first season, he accomplished promotion with the club to the 2005-06 Serbian League West, 3rd League. In the winter break of that season he moved to Slovenia but he only played one match for the club in the Slovenian First League. In summer 2007, still young, he went to the Netherlands and played six months with the B squad of SC Heerenveen before returning in winter to Serbia to play the rest of the season with FK Novi Pazar in the Serbian First League, second national division. While playing there he became a standard player having for the first time the chance of playing 16 league matches in half season. This did not go unnoticed, and an ambitious club from Azerbaijan, Standard Baku signed him that summer, in 2007. However next winter he went back to Serbia and helped the Vlade Divac backed club FK Sloga Kraljevo to be promoted to the Serbian First League. Next summer he moved, this time to Montenegrin First League club FK Jedinstvo Bijelo Polje. But this was only for a half season spell, since he moved next winter to Poland to play with Ekstraklasa historical club ŁKS Łódź. That year was not successful for the club and at the end of the season they were relegated. Đenić however stayed this time, but after six months playing in Polish second level he returned to Serbia and signed with FK Bežanija who were playing in the Serbian second level. This proved to be good for him since he managed to score 6 times in 11 league matches attracting the attention of the Serbian SuperLiga clubs. The most persistent was FK Jagodina and they signed him in summer 2010.

== Honours ==
Jagodina

- Serbian Cup: 2013
