= List of Serbian football transfers summer 2017 =

- This is a list of transfers in Serbian football for the 2017–18 summer transfer window.
- Moves featuring Serbian SuperLiga and Serbian First League sides are listed.
- The order by which the clubs are listed is equal to the classifications at the end of the 2016–17 season.

== Serbian SuperLiga ==
=== Partizan ===
In: Note: Flags indicate national team as defined under FIFA eligibility rules; some limited exceptions apply. Players may hold more than one non-FIFA nationality.

No.	Pos.	Nation	Player
44	MF	Serbia	Armin Đerlek (free, last with OFK Beograd)
1	GK	Serbia	Đorđe Lazović (loan return from Teleoptik)
5	DF	Serbia	Strahinja Bošnjak (loan return from Teleoptik)
99	FW	Serbia	Đorđe Jovanović (loan return from Teleoptik)
55	MF	Serbia	Danilo Pantić (on loan from (England) Chelsea)
73	DF	Serbia	Nemanja R. Miletić (from (Belgium) Westerlo)
20	MF	Guinea	Seydouba Soumah (from (Slovakia) Slovan Bratislava)
77	FW	Nigeria	Theophilus Solomon (on loan from (Croatia) Rijeka)
88	GK	Serbia	Vladimir Stojković (from (England) Nottingham Forest)
9	FW	Serbia	Dušan Vlahović (on loan from, previously sold to (Italy) Fiorentina)
7	MF	Serbia	Zoran Tošić (from (Russia) CSKA Moscow)
30	DF	Serbia	Milan Mitrović (from (Turkey) Mersin İdmanyurdu)
33	DF	Serbia	Nemanja Antonov (on loan from (Switzerland) Grasshopper)
51	FW	Serbia	Ognjen Ožegović (from Čukarički)

Out: Note: Flags indicate national team as defined under FIFA eligibility rules; some limited exceptions apply. Players may hold more than one non-FIFA nationality.

No.	Pos.	Nation	Player
28	MF	Serbia	Ivan Petrović (to (Slovenia) Brežice 1919)
31	DF	Serbia	Nikola Milenković (to (Italy) Fiorentina)
—	MF	Serbia	Tomislav Todorović (to (Montenegro) Zeta, was on loan at Teleoptik)
—	DF	Serbia	Uroš Zlatović (to Radnički NP, was on loan at Teleoptik)
80	MF	Serbia	Marko Golubović (to Radnički Niš, was on loan at Sinđelić Beograd)
—	MF	Montenegro	Jovan Čađenović (to Zemun, was on loan at Bežanija)
—	DF	Serbia	Miloš Perišić (to Borac Čačak, was on loan at OFK Odžaci)
—	MF	Serbia	Igor Maksimović (to Voždovac)
19	DF	Bosnia and Herzegovina	Aleksandar Subić (on loan to Radnički Niš, was on loan at (Bosnia and Herzegovina) Sloboda Tuzla)
37	FW	Serbia	Miloš Kukolj (on loan to Dinamo Pančevo, was on loan at IMT)
7	MF	Serbia	Nemanja Mihajlović (to (Netherlands) Heerenveen)
42	MF	Brazil	Leonardo (to (Saudi Arabia) Al-Ahli)
—	DF	Bosnia and Herzegovina	Marko Čubrilo (loan extension to Teleoptik)
—	FW	Serbia	Stefan Đurić (loan extension to Teleoptik)
—	MF	Serbia	Saša Manić (to Dinamo Vranje)
—	FW	Serbia	Živorad Arnautović (to Čukarički, was on loan at Lokomotiva Beograd)
—	GK	Serbia	Stevan Jovanović (on loan to Jedinstvo Surčin)
—	DF	Serbia	Luka Cucin (loan extension to Teleoptik)
—	MF	Serbia	Lazar Vujanić (loan extension to Teleoptik)
—	MF	Serbia	Filip Čermelj (loan extension to Teleoptik)
45	MF	Serbia	Jovan Nišić (loan extension to Teleoptik)
—	MF	Serbia	Filip Jović (loan extension to Teleoptik)
—	FW	Serbia	Stefan Ilić (loan extension to Teleoptik)
—	FW	Serbia	Strahinja Jovanović (loan extension to Teleoptik)
30	MF	Serbia	Veljko Birmančević (loan extension to Teleoptik)
—	DF	Serbia	Jovan Krstić (loan extension to Teleoptik)
—	DF	Montenegro	Peđa Savić (loan extension to Teleoptik)
—	GK	Serbia	Jovan Trnić (loan extension to Teleoptik)
—	DF	Serbia	Dušan Todorović (to Kolubara, was on loan at Cement Beočin)
—		Serbia	Uroš Arsović (on loan to Radnički Obrenovac)
32	FW	Serbia	Uroš Đurđević (to (Greece) Olympiacos)
—	MF	Serbia	Filip Minić (was on loan, now signed with Teleoptik)
70	FW	Serbia	Sava Petrov (to Spartak Subotica, was on loan at Teleoptik)
—	GK	Serbia	Aleksandar Popović (on loan to Teleoptik)
—	FW	Serbia	Nikola Lakčević (on loan to Teleoptik)
—	DF	Serbia	Adnan Islamović (loan extension to Teleoptik)
8	FW	Serbia	Vladimir Đilas (on loan to Teleoptik)
85	GK	Serbia	Nemanja Stevanović (on loan to Teleoptik)

=== Red Star Belgrade ===
In: Note: Flags indicate national team as defined under FIFA eligibility rules; some limited exceptions apply. Players may hold more than one non-FIFA nationality.

No.	Pos.	Nation	Player
77	MF	Serbia	Marko Gobeljić (from Napredak Kruševac)
30	DF	Montenegro	Filip Stojković (from (Germany) 1860 Munich)
89	MF	Brazil	Ricardinho (from (Moldova) Sheriff Tiraspol)
90	DF	Serbia	Vujadin Savić (from (Moldova) Sheriff Tiraspol)
14	FW	Ghana	Richmond Boakye (was on loan, now signed from (Italy) Latina)
45	FW	Serbia	Aleksandar Pešić (from (France) Toulouse)
15	DF	Serbia	Srđan Babić (on loan from (Spain) Real Sociedad)
44	DF	Brazil	Zé Marcos (from (Brazil) Atlético Paranaense)
3	MF	Serbia	Branko Jovičić (from (Russia) Amkar Perm)
23	DF	Serbia	Milan Rodić (from (Russia) Krylia Sovetov)
49	FW	Serbia	Nemanja Radonjić (on loan from (Italy) Roma)
82	GK	Canada	Milan Borjan (from (Bulgaria) Ludogorets)
40	MF	Serbia	Luka Ilić (on loan from, previously sold to (England) Manchester City)
95	MF	Serbia	Ivan Ilić (on loan from, previously sold to (England) Manchester City)
7	MF	Serbia	Nenad Krstičić (from (Spain) Alavés)
21	MF	Serbia	Filip Bainović (from Rad)
—	FW	Ghana	Ibrahim Tanko (from (Ghana) Mighty Jets, to youth team)
—	MF	Serbia	Pavle Tošković (from Kiker, to youth team)

Out: Note: Flags indicate national team as defined under FIFA eligibility rules; some limited exceptions apply. Players may hold more than one non-FIFA nationality.

No.	Pos.	Nation	Player
93	MF	Serbia	Marko Poletanović (loan return to (Belgium) Gent)
3	DF	Serbia	Aleksandar Luković (retired)
2	DF	Serbia	Marko Petković (to (Russia) Spartak Moscow)
81	FW	Serbia	Predrag Sikimić (to (Kazakhstan) Atyrau)
—	GK	Montenegro	Maksim Milović (to Voždovac)
99	FW	Montenegro	Petar Orlandić (to (Portugal) União da Madeira)
17	MF	Serbia	Srđan Plavšić (to (Czech Republic) Sparta Prague)
73	MF	Serbia	Mihailo Ristić (to (Russia) Krasnodar)
69	FW	Serbia	Srđan Vujaklija (to (Kazakhstan) Ordabasy)
—	FW	Serbia	Stefan Ilić (to Bežanija, was on loan at Radnički Niš)
—	FW	Serbia	Lazar Romanić (on loan to Borac Čačak, was on loan at OFK Beograd)
—	FW	Serbia	Marko Platiša (to (Malta) Balzan, was on loan at Grafičar Beograd)
22	GK	Serbia	Filip Manojlović (to (Spain) Getafe)
—	DF	Serbia	Filip Maksić (to (Czech Republic) Sparta Prague)
—	DF	Montenegro	Balša Goranović (to (Montenegro) Zeta)
9	FW	Serbia	Milan Pavkov (on loan to Radnički Niš)
—	DF	Serbia	Filip Stanković (to Radnički Niš)
94	MF	Montenegro	Vladimir Jovović (to (Czech Republic) Jablonec, was on loan at Spartak Subotica)
7	FW	Costa Rica	John Jairo Ruiz (to (Saudi Arabia) Al-Fayha)
41	GK	Serbia	Jovan Vićić (on loan to (Bosnia and Herzegovina) Drina Zvornik, was on loan at Bežanija)
—	DF	Serbia	Bogdan Račić (loan extension to Sremac Vojka)
—	MF	Serbia	Damjan Gojkov (on loan to Bežanija, previously brought from OFK Beograd)
—	MF	Serbia	Nemanja Tomašević (to Rad)
—	MF	Serbia	Đorđe Petrović (to Prva Iskra)
34	DF	Serbia	Miloš Stojanović (on loan to Sinđelić Beograd, was on loan at Bežanija)
32	GK	Serbia	Aleksandar Stanković (loan extension to Grafičar Beograd)
—	FW	Iceland	Đorđe Panić (on loan to Grafičar Beograd)
—	FW	Serbia	Stefan Vudragović (on loan to Grafičar Beograd)
—	MF	Serbia	Andrija Crnadak (loan extension to Grafičar Beograd)
—	DF	Serbia	Marko Konatar (on loan to Grafičar Beograd)
—	FW	Serbia	Aleksandar Bogdanović (on loan to Grafičar Beograd)
—	MF	Serbia	Miloš Z. Nikolić (loan extension to Grafičar Beograd)
—	MF	Serbia	Nikola Puzić (loan extension to Grafičar Beograd)
—	GK	Serbia	Ilija Ćatić (loan extension to Grafičar Beograd)
—	MF	Serbia	Viktor Živojinović (loan extension to Grafičar Beograd)
—	MF	Bosnia and Herzegovina	Jovan Ilić (on loan to Grafičar Beograd)
—	MF	Serbia	Stefan Cvetković (on loan to Grafičar Beograd)
—	FW	Serbia	Milan Panović (to Radnički Beograd, was on loan at Bežanija)
—	DF	Serbia	Marko Mijailović (to Rad, was on loan at Bežanija)
—	FW	North Macedonia	Darko Grozdanoski (on loan to Žarkovo, was on loan at BASK)
—	GK	Serbia	Uroš Kostić (to BSK Borča)
—	GK	Serbia	Strahinja Savić (on loan to Sopot)
23	MF	Serbia	Andrija Luković (on loan to Voždovac)
—	DF	Serbia	Draško Đorđević (on loan to Bežanija, was on loan at OFK Beograd)
—	DF	North Macedonia	Antonio Mitrev (to (Malta) Balzan)
—	MF	Serbia	Milan Milanović (to Dinamo Vranje, was on loan at Grafičar Beograd)
—	MF	Serbia	Stefan Mihajlović (to Voždovac)
29	DF	Brazil	Mateus Viveiros (on loan to Bežanija)
—	DF	Serbia	Nemanja Stojić (on loan to Grafičar Beograd)
—	MF	Serbia	Milan Senić (on loan to (Hungary) Siófok, was on loan at OFK Beograd)
98	FW	Serbia	Vanja Vučićević (on loan to Borac Čačak)

=== Vojvodina ===
In: Note: Flags indicate national team as defined under FIFA eligibility rules; some limited exceptions apply. Players may hold more than one non-FIFA nationality.

No.	Pos.	Nation	Player
2	DF	Serbia	Milan Lazarević (loan return from Proleter Novi Sad)
32	GK	Serbia	Marko Ilić (loan return from Proleter Novi Sad)
27	DF	Bosnia and Herzegovina	Dženan Bureković (loan return from (Bosnia and Herzegovina) Čelik Zenica)
—	FW	Ghana	Francis Afriyie (was on loan, now signed from (Ghana) Bechem United)
18	MF	Serbia	Nemanja Subotić (from Budućnost Dobanovci)
—	FW	Serbia	Milan Bubalo (from (Thailand) Pattaya United)
6	DF	Brazil	Renan (from (Azerbaijan) Kapaz)
99	FW	Serbia	Stefan Mihajlović (from Borac Čačak)
—	MF	Croatia	Hrvoje Rizvanović (from (Germany) Anadolu Bayern II)
7	MF	Canada	Stefan Cebara (from (Lithuania) Utenis Utena)
28	MF	Montenegro	Luka Vujanović (from (Montenegro) Lovćen)
22	FW	Serbia	Ivica Jovanović (from (Iceland) Vikingur Reykjavik)
70	MF	Montenegro	Vasko Kalezić (from (Montenegro) Zeta)
—	DF	Bosnia and Herzegovina	Bojan Batar (from (Bosnia and Herzegovina) Borac Banja Luka)
—	DF	Serbia	Jevrem Kosnić (from (Italy) Reggina)
5	DF	Bosnia and Herzegovina	Siniša Saničanin (from Mladost Lučani)
24	MF	Bosnia and Herzegovina	Ognjen Đelmić (from (Hungary) Debrecen)
15	FW	South Korea	Park In-hyeok (on loan from (Germany) TSG 1899 Hoffenheim)
80	MF	North Macedonia	Daniel Avramovski (on loan from (Slovenia) Olimpija Ljubljana)
10	MF	Montenegro	Damir Kojašević (from (North Macedonia) Vardar)
—	GK	Spain	Marko Cicović (from (Spain) Las Palmas)
—	FW	Denmark	Adda Djeziri (free, last with (Algeria) ASO Chlef)

Out: Note: Flags indicate national team as defined under FIFA eligibility rules; some limited exceptions apply. Players may hold more than one non-FIFA nationality.

No.	Pos.	Nation	Player
6	DF	Serbia	Nino Pekarić (retired)
8	MF	Serbia	Darko Puškarić (to Čukarički)
10	MF	Serbia	Aleksandar Paločević (to (Portugal) Arouca)
16	MF	Serbia	Siniša Babić (to (Greece) AEL)
51	DF	Serbia	Mario Maslać (to (Kazakhstan) Irtysh Pavlodar)
4	DF	Serbia	Emir Lotinac (released)
—	DF	Serbia	Igor Vukomanović (loan return to Borac Čačak)
80	MF	Serbia	Filip Knežević (to Borac Čačak)
7	MF	Serbia	Dejan Meleg (to (Turkey) Kayserispor)
—	FW	Bosnia and Herzegovina	Vladimir Kremenović (released)
13	DF	Serbia	Nikola Aksentijević (to Radnički Niš)
—	MF	Serbia	David Dunđerski (to Spartak Subotica)
31	FW	Serbia	Uroš Stamenić (to Borac Čačak)
5	MF	Serbia	Nikola Kovačević (to Radnički Niš)
95	MF	Serbia	Milan Spremo (to Bačka BP)
92	FW	Serbia	Nikola Trujić (to (Russia) Tosno)
11	FW	Serbia	Saša Ćurko (to Proleter Novi Sad)
21	FW	Montenegro	Stefan Đorđević (to (Montenegro) Petrovac)
25	GK	Montenegro	Marko Kordić (released)
—	DF	Serbia	Stefan Kostić (to Inđija)
—	GK	Serbia	Dušan Vojvodić (to Inđija)
24	MF	Serbia	Marko Đurišić (to Mačva Šabac, was on loan at Proleter Novi Sad)
—	MF	Serbia	Ognjen Mitrović (to Brodarac)
—	DF	Montenegro	Stefan Zogović (to OFK Odžaci, was on loan at ČSK Čelarevo)
—	MF	Serbia	Srđan Šćepanović (loan extension to Proleter Novi Sad)
19	FW	Serbia	Milan Mirosavljev (on loan to Proleter Novi Sad, previously brought from the same club)
—	FW	Serbia	Milutin Miletić (on loan to Cement Beočin)
—	FW	Serbia	Nikola Gajić (on loan to Cement Beočin)
—	MF	Bosnia and Herzegovina	Darko Jović (on loan to ČSK Čelarevo, was on loan at OFK Odžaci)
—	DF	Serbia	Đorđe Knežević (on loan to Radnički Zrenjanin, was on loan at Crvena Zvezda NS)
—		Serbia	Miloš Tepavčević (to Inđija)
—	MF	Serbia	Nemanja Drča (to Radnički Šid)
22	FW	Serbia	Filip Malbašić (to (Spain) Tenerife)
15	FW	Serbia	Bogdan Planić (to (Romania) Steaua București)
38	FW	Serbia	Marko Bačanin (to (Greece) Chania Kissamikos)
9	MF	Serbia	Petar Mićin (to Čukarički, was on loan at Crvena Zvezda NS)
37	DF	Serbia	Slobodan Rubežić (to Čukarički)
—	DF	Serbia	Mitar Ergelaš (to Čukarički)
—	DF	Bosnia and Herzegovina	Marko Bogojević (on loan to Radnički Šid, previously brought from (Germany) 1865 Dachau)
35	FW	Serbia	Slobodan Tedić (to Čukarički)

=== Mladost Lučani ===
In: Note: Flags indicate national team as defined under FIFA eligibility rules; some limited exceptions apply. Players may hold more than one non-FIFA nationality.

No.	Pos.	Nation	Player
23	GK	Serbia	Dragan Rosić (loan return from Kolubara)
10	MF	Uzbekistan	Husniddin Gafurov (from Javor Ivanjica)
13	FW	Ghana	Bismarck Appiah (from Bačka BP)
99	MF	Serbia	Veljko Kijevčanin (from BIP Čačak)
20	MF	Serbia	Nenad Marinković (from Voždovac)
11	MF	Serbia	Uroš Sinđić (from Voždovac)
32	FW	Serbia	Ivan Marković (from Novi Pazar)
14	FW	Serbia	Miloš Trifunović (from Radnik Surdulica)
98	MF	Serbia	Zehrudin Mehmedović (from Čukarički)
26	DF	Serbia	Slavko Marić (from Novi Pazar)
1	GK	Serbia	Nikola Petrić (from Čukarički)
16	MF	Serbia	Nikola Cuckić (from OFK Beograd)
5	MF	China	Wang Lei (from Temnić)
88	MF	Serbia	Stefan Milosavljević (from Zemun)
21	DF	Serbia	Stefan Jovanović (from Zemun)

Out: Note: Flags indicate national team as defined under FIFA eligibility rules; some limited exceptions apply. Players may hold more than one non-FIFA nationality.

No.	Pos.	Nation	Player
13	DF	Serbia	Darko Rakočević (released)
10	FW	Serbia	Radomir Milosavljević (to (Switzerland) Lugano)
11	MF	Serbia	Nebojša Gavrić (to Voždovac)
33	DF	Serbia	Radoš Protić (to Mačva Šabac)
16	FW	Serbia	Bojan Čečarić (to Spartak Subotica)
14	FW	Serbia	Marko Simić (to Novi Pazar)
88	FW	Serbia	Milan Bojović (to (Kazakhstan) Kaisar)
—	MF	Serbia	Predrag Luka (to Temnić, was on loan at OFK Beograd)
—	FW	Serbia	Nikola Pantović (on loan to LFK Mladost Lučani, previously brought from the same club)
—	MF	Serbia	Filip Glišović (on loan to LFK Mladost Lučani)
—	DF	Serbia	Milutin Bugarčić (on loan to LFK Mladost Lučani)
—	MF	Serbia	Filip Bugarčić (on loan to LFK Mladost Lučani)
—	FW	Serbia	Ivan Plazinić (on loan to LFK Mladost Lučani)
58	DF	Serbia	Miloš Ristić (loan extension to Sloga Požega)
—	DF	Serbia	Nikola Terzin (to Loznica, previously brought from Polet Nakovo)
—		Serbia	Đorđe Nešovanović (on loan to Ovčar Markovica)
—		Serbia	Nikola Nešovanović (on loan to Ovčar Markovica)
7	FW	Serbia	Saša Jovanović (to (Spain) Córdoba)
1	GK	Serbia	Nemanja Krznarić (to Radnički Niš)
12	FW	Serbia	Nenad Gavrić (to Mačva Šabac)
20	MF	Serbia	Matija Protić (on loan to Sloga Požega)
5	DF	Bosnia and Herzegovina	Siniša Saničanin (to Vojvodina)

=== Radnički Niš ===
In: Note: Flags indicate national team as defined under FIFA eligibility rules; some limited exceptions apply. Players may hold more than one non-FIFA nationality.

No.	Pos.	Nation	Player
—	MF	Serbia	Ilija Stojančić (loan return from Real Niš, to youth team)
—	MF	Serbia	Ivan Krstić (loan return from Real Niš, to youth team)
—	DF	Serbia	Mladen Mitrović (loan return from Car Konstantin)
—	DF	Serbia	Dragomir Nikolić (loan return from Car Konstantin)
26	DF	Serbia	Vladimir Simunović (from Inđija)
13	DF	Serbia	Nikola Aksentijević (from Vojvodina)
80	MF	Serbia	Marko Golubović (from Partizan)
1	GK	Serbia	Mladen Živković (from Novi Pazar)
3	DF	Serbia	Predrag Stanković (from Brodarac)
8	FW	Serbia	Slaviša Stojanović (from (Israel) Hapoel Kfar Saba)
12	GK	Serbia	Bojan Brać (from (Slovakia) Dukla Banská Bystrica)
4	DF	Serbia	Andrija Mijailović (from Bežanija)
19	DF	Bosnia and Herzegovina	Aleksandar Subić (on loan from Partizan)
25	FW	Serbia	Milan Pavkov (on loan from Red Star Belgrade)
2	DF	Serbia	Filip Stanković (from Red Star Belgrade)
18	MF	Serbia	Nikola Kovačević (from Vojvodina)
23	FW	Serbia	Milutin Ivanović (from (Armenia) Shirak)
84	GK	Serbia	Nemanja Krznarić (from Mladost Lučani)
45	DF	Serbia	Ivan Miladinović (from Jagodina)
15	DF	Serbia	Nikola Raspopović (from (Turkey) Adana Demirspor)

Out: Note: Flags indicate national team as defined under FIFA eligibility rules; some limited exceptions apply. Players may hold more than one non-FIFA nationality.

No.	Pos.	Nation	Player
3	DF	Montenegro	Vladimir Volkov (to Rad)
40	DF	Serbia	Milan Perendija (to (Romania) Gaz Metan Mediaș)
95	FW	Serbia	Stefan Ilić (loan return to Red Star Belgrade)
36	FW	Serbia	Nemanja Kojić (to (Turkey) İstanbulspor)
89	GK	Montenegro	Bojan Zogović (to Rad)
67	MF	Serbia	Nikola Mitrović (to (Bosnia and Herzegovina) Sloga Simin Han)
—	MF	Serbia	Lazar Kostić (to AZ Borac, was on loan at Car Konstantin)
8	MF	Serbia	Pavle Popara (to Zemun)
4	DF	Serbia	Radoš Bulatović (to Radnik Surdulica)
6	DF	Serbia	Miloš Živković (to Bačka BP)
30	GK	Serbia	Vladimir Bajić (to Borac Čačak)
23	MF	Serbia	Miloš Stanojević (to (Bosnia and Herzegovina) Sarajevo)
—	MF	Bosnia and Herzegovina	Elmin Hadžikadunić (to (Bosnia and Herzegovina) Čelik Zenica)
—	MF	Serbia	Aleksandar Pešić (to Budućnost Popovac)
—	DF	Serbia	Aleksa Ivanović (to Budućnost Popovac)
—	MF	Serbia	Saša Domić (on loan to Dunav Prahovo)
—	MF	Serbia	Stefan Zdravković (to Ozren Sokobanja, was on loan at Car Konstantin)
22	DF	Serbia	Lazar Anđelković (on loan to Radnički Pirot, was on loan at Dunav Prahovo)
—	FW	Serbia	Amir Zeka (on loan to Rudar Alpos)
75	FW	Serbia	Lazar Ranđelović (on loan to Dinamo Vranje, was on loan at Car Konstantin)
—	DF	Serbia	Ivan Mladenović (to Car Konstantin, was on loan to Budućnost Popovac)
—	MF	Serbia	Mario Stojanović (on loan to Car Konstantin)
—	MF	Serbia	Filip Alija (was on loan, now signed with Sinđelić Niš)
—	FW	Serbia	Marko Branković (on loan to Sinđelić Niš, was on loan at Ozren Sokobanja)
—		Serbia	Uroš Stanojević (to Budućnost Popovac)
—	MF	Turkey	Günkut Özer (to Palilulac Niš)
—	DF	Serbia	Stefan Mihajlović (to Radnički Pirot)
—	DF	Serbia	Mitar Mladenović (to (Germany) Bad Dürrheim, was on loan at Sinđelić Niš)
15	DF	Serbia	Nemanja Ljubisavljević (to (Croatia) Gorica, was on loan at Dinamo Vranje)
50	FW	Serbia	Nikola Petković (to Radnički NP, was on loan at Car Konstantin)
69	MF	Serbia	Marko Listeš (on loan to Sinđelić Niš)
—	FW	Serbia	Mladen Radenković (on loan to Radnički Pirot)
—	DF	Serbia	Petar Bogdanović (on loan to Timok, was on loan at Car Konstantin)
—	DF	Serbia	Rastko Stojanović (to Rudar Alpos, was on loan at Sinđelić Niš)
—	FW	Serbia	Ilija Šuković (was on loan, now signed with Sinđelić Niš)
—	DF	Serbia	Srđan Marinković (loan extension to Sinđelić Niš)
22	MF	Montenegro	Savo Gazivoda (to (Montenegro) Iskra Danilovgrad, previously brought from Radnik Surdulica)
—	MF	Serbia	Dušan Žikić (to Timok)
—	FW	Serbia	Lazar Nikolić (on loan to Jedinstvo Bošnjace, was on loan at Dunav Prahovo)
—	FW	Serbia	Lazar Mitrović (was on loan, now signed for (Czech Republic) Bohemians 1905)

=== Napredak Kruševac ===
In: Note: Flags indicate national team as defined under FIFA eligibility rules; some limited exceptions apply. Players may hold more than one non-FIFA nationality.

No.	Pos.	Nation	Player
—		Serbia	Dušan Marković (loan return from Moravica Subotinac)
77	FW	Serbia	Filip Bajić (from Bačka BP)
9	MF	Serbia	Nemanja Milisavljević (from Kopaonik Brus)
12	DF	Serbia	Nemanja Petrović (from (Portugal) Chaves)
69	FW	Bosnia and Herzegovina	Uroš Đerić (from Sloboda Užice)
25	DF	Serbia	Nikola Boranijašević (from (Latvia) Ventspils)
19	FW	Serbia	Mitar Radivojević (from Trstenik PPT)
—	GK	Serbia	Mattia Miljojković (from Metalac G. M., to youth team)
—	MF	Serbia	Andrija Pecić (from Trstenik PPT, to youth team)
—	GK	Serbia	Nemanja Andrijanić (from Spartak Subotica, to youth team)
15	DF	Serbia	Dušan Veškovac (from (France) Toulouse)
21	MF	Serbia	Igor Ivanović (from Jagodina)
14	MF	Serbia	Nikola Mitrović (from (Cyprus) Anorthosis)

Out: Note: Flags indicate national team as defined under FIFA eligibility rules; some limited exceptions apply. Players may hold more than one non-FIFA nationality.

No.	Pos.	Nation	Player
77	MF	Serbia	Marko Gobeljić (to Red Star Belgrade)
3	DF	Serbia	Miloš Cvetković (to (Bulgaria) Levski Sofia)
—	GK	Serbia	Matija Savović (to Trayal)
—	MF	Serbia	Filip Gogić (on loan to Trayal)
—	DF	Serbia	Filip Đurović (on loan to Trayal)
9	FW	Serbia	Nemanja Vidaković (released)
19	MF	Serbia	Marko Ristić (to Trayal, was on loan at Trstenik PPT)
72	FW	Senegal	Ibrahima Mame N'Diaye (to (Denmark) Randers)
11	MF	Serbia	Branimir Petrović (released)
88	MF	Serbia	Bojan Beljić (to Jedinstvo Ub)
28	MF	Serbia	Dino Šarac (to Bačka BP)
21	DF	Serbia	Dragan Žarković (to (Iran) Gostaresh Foulad, was on loan at Radnik Surdulica)
23	DF	Serbia	Josip Projić (to (Bosnia and Herzegovina) Željezničar Sarajevo)
31	MF	Serbia	Luka Marković (on loan to Trayal)
—	DF	Serbia	Nikola Radmanovac (on loan to Bežanija, was on loan at Brodarac 1947)
55	DF	Serbia	Nemanja Tubić (released)
66	MF	Serbia	Marko Stanojević (loan extension to Temnić)
79	FW	Serbia	Andrija Majdevac (on loan to Temnić, was on loan at Dinamo Vranje)
—	GK	Serbia	Filip Janaćković (released, was on loan at Dubočica)
18	FW	Russia	Daur Kvekveskiri (released)
—	FW	Serbia	Lazar Popić (on loan to Bošnjane)
—	DF	Serbia	Filip Krstić (was on loan, now signed with Jedinstvo Paraćin)
—	FW	Serbia	Nikola Palurović (on loan to Jedinstvo Paraćin)
—		Serbia	Pavle Ivelja (to OFK Odžaci)
—		Serbia	Vukašin Đurić (on loan to Trstenik PPT)

=== Voždovac ===
In: Note: Flags indicate national team as defined under FIFA eligibility rules; some limited exceptions apply. Players may hold more than one non-FIFA nationality.

No.	Pos.	Nation	Player
12	GK	Montenegro	Maksim Milović (from Red Star Belgrade)
44	FW	Serbia	Alen Mašović (from Čukarički)
22	GK	Serbia	Marko Knežević (from Smederevo)
14	MF	Serbia	Igor Maksimović (from Partizan)
11	FW	Montenegro	Mihailo Perović (from (Hungary) Újpest)
27	MF	Serbia	Nebojša Gavrić (from Mladost Lučani)
20	MF	Serbia	Andrija Luković (on loan from Red Star Belgrade)
36	GK	Serbia	Mihajlo Karadžić (from Čukarički)
16	MF	Serbia	Marko Pavlovski (from (Croatia) RNK Split)
—	MF	Serbia	Stefan Mihajlović (from Red Star Belgrade, to youth team)
—		Bosnia and Herzegovina	Aleksa Mrđa (from (Bosnia and Herzegovina) Krupa, to youth team)
—	MF	Serbia	Stevan Marinković (from Jagodina, to youth team)

Out: Note: Flags indicate national team as defined under FIFA eligibility rules; some limited exceptions apply. Players may hold more than one non-FIFA nationality.

No.	Pos.	Nation	Player
13	MF	Serbia	Nenad Marinković (to Mladost Lučani)
4	MF	Serbia	Uroš Sinđić (to Mladost Lučani)
20	MF	Montenegro	Nemanja Nikolić (released)
—	MF	Serbia	Aleksandar Mirković (to Dinamo Pančevo)
14	MF	Serbia	Elmir Asani (to Zemun)
11	MF	Serbia	Ivan Marković (to Radnik Surdulica)
9	FW	Serbia	Stefan Dražić (to (Belgium) Mechelen)
3	MF	Serbia	Ognjen Krasić (to (Armenia) Banants)
22	GK	Serbia	Marko Milošević (to Zemun)
12	GK	Serbia	Petar Čarapić (to IMT)
19	DF	Serbia	Filip Damnjanović (on loan to IMT)
—	FW	Serbia	Bogdan Mandić (on loan to IMT)
16	MF	Serbia	Mihailo Oreščanin (loan extension to Radnički Obrenovac)
—		Serbia	Aleksa Stegnjaić (on loan to BSK Borča, previously brought from Hajduk Beograd)
8	FW	Montenegro	Dejan Račić (on loan to BSK Borča)

=== Javor Ivanjica ===
In: Note: Flags indicate national team as defined under FIFA eligibility rules; some limited exceptions apply. Players may hold more than one non-FIFA nationality.

No.	Pos.	Nation	Player
33	DF	Serbia	Nikola Bjelanović (loan return from IMT)
17	MF	Serbia	Nenad Sević (loan return from Kolubara)
19	FW	Serbia	Filip Obadović (loan return from Budućnost Krušik)
15	MF	Serbia	Filip Lakićević (loan return from Zlatibor Čajetina)
11	MF	Montenegro	Alija Krnić (from (Spain) Almudévar)
22	FW	North Macedonia	Filip Ivanovski (from (North Macedonia) Rabotnički)
5	MF	Serbia	Stevan Kovačević (from (Montenegro) Sutjeska Nikšić)
4	MF	Serbia	Milan Marčić (from Borac Čačak)
6	MF	Serbia	Nikola Mitić (from Borac Čačak)

Out: Note: Flags indicate national team as defined under FIFA eligibility rules; some limited exceptions apply. Players may hold more than one non-FIFA nationality.

No.	Pos.	Nation	Player
16	MF	Serbia	Nikola Karaklajić (to (Montenegro) Iskra Danilovgrad)
10	MF	Serbia	Igor Stojaković (to Sloga Požega)
11	MF	Uzbekistan	Husniddin Gafurov (to Mladost Lučani)
—	FW	Serbia	Marko Zečević (was on loan, now signed with Bačka BP)
—	FW	Serbia	Aleksandar Dimitrić (to Jedinstvo SP)
12	GK	Serbia	Toma Koković (released)
5	MF	Serbia	Saša Tomanović (to TSC)
—	MF	Serbia	Jordan Jovanović (to Mačva Šabac, was on loan at BSK Borča)
—	MF	Serbia	Nemanja Živković (to Loznica)
13	FW	Angola	Alexander Christovão (to (Poland) Zagłębie Sosnowiec)
9	FW	Serbia	Nikola Dišić (on loan to Lokomotiva Beograd, was on loan at Mihajlovac 1934)
—		Serbia	Ognjen Luković (on loan to Brodarac)
4	MF	Serbia	Mladen Mićanović (to Bežanja)
—	FW	Ivory Coast	Herve Bostan Amani (on loan to Radnički Kragujevac, previously brought from (Togo) Entente)
6	DF	North Macedonia	Nikola Stojanov (to Lokomotiva Beograd, was on loan at IMT)

=== Čukarički ===
In: Note: Flags indicate national team as defined under FIFA eligibility rules; some limited exceptions apply. Players may hold more than one non-FIFA nationality.

No.	Pos.	Nation	Player
—	DF	Serbia	Miloš Maksimović (loan return from Brodarac 1947)
—	MF	Serbia	Stefan Paštar (loan return from Sinđelić Beograd)
—	FW	Serbia	Nemanja Stanković (loan return from Lokomotiva Beograd)
42	MF	Serbia	Ivan Jovanović (loan return from IMT)
8	MF	Montenegro	Nikola Drinčić (free, last with Rad)
4	DF	Serbia	Đorđe Crnomarković (from (Slovenia) Olimpija Ljubljana)
12	GK	Serbia	Aleksandar Kirovski (from Zemun)
21	MF	Serbia	Darko Puškarić (from Vojvodina)
7	FW	Serbia	Ognjen Mudrinski (from Spartak Subotica)
1	GK	Serbia	Nemanja Belić (from Metalac G. M.)
—	FW	Serbia	Aleksa Denić (on loan from Kiker, to youth team)
19	MF	Ghana	Samuel Owusu (from (Turkey) Ankaragücü)
18	MF	Serbia	Petar Mićin (from Vojvodina)
88	MF	Serbia	Nenad Adamović (from (Israel) Maccabi Petah Tikva)
77	DF	Montenegro	Lazar Đokić (from Dinamo Vranje)
—	DF	Serbia	Slobodan Rubežić (from Vojvodina, to youth team)
—	DF	Serbia	Mitar Ergelaš (from Vojvodina, to youth team)
51	FW	Serbia	Slobodan Tedić (from Vojvodina)
35	GK	Serbia	Damjan Knežević (from ČSK Čelarevo)

Out: Note: Flags indicate national team as defined under FIFA eligibility rules; some limited exceptions apply. Players may hold more than one non-FIFA nationality.

No.	Pos.	Nation	Player
55	DF	Serbia	Erhan Mašović (to (Belgium) Club Brugge)
10	MF	Serbia	Igor Matić (retired)
71	GK	Serbia	Filip Pajović (to (Hungary) Újpest)
42	DF	Serbia	Nemanja Cvetković (to Sloboda Užice, was on loan at BASK)
21	FW	Serbia	Aleksandar Jevtić (to (Thailand) Pattaya United)
6	MF	Serbia	Dragoljub Srnić (to (Poland) Śląsk Wrocław)
11	FW	Serbia	Alen Mašović (to Voždovac)
—	GK	Serbia	Nemanja Radović (was on loan, now signed with Radnički Zrenjanin)
28	FW	Serbia	Nemanja Radonjić (loan return to (Italy) Roma)
—	GK	Serbia	Teodor Obadal (was on loan, now signed with Lokomotiva Beograd)
57	MF	Serbia	Zehrudin Mehmedović (to Mladost Lučani)
7	FW	Montenegro	Staniša Mandić (on loan to (Norway) Sogndal)
—	FW	Serbia	Stefan Ilić (to Inđija)
1	GK	Serbia	Nikola Petrić (to Mladost Lučani)
65	MF	Serbia	Stefan Šapić (loan extension to Sinđelić Beograd)
61	GK	Serbia	Petar Ćulibrk (to Žarkovo)
—	FW	Serbia	Živorad Arnautović (on loan to Internacional, previously brought from Partizan)
—	MF	Serbia	Milan Mirić (to Sloboda Užice)
—	DF	Serbia	Marko Kilibarda (to BASK)
—	DF	Bosnia and Herzegovina	Seid Preljević (to BASK)
—	MF	Serbia	Predrag Jovanović (on loan to BASK, was on loan at IMT)
—	MF	Serbia	Luka Zorić (on loan to Grafičar Beograd)
—		Serbia	Uroš Mladenović (to IMT, was on loan at Brodarac 1947)
—	GK	Serbia	Luka Radotić (to Inđija)
—	DF	Serbia	Uroš Vukićević (to Spartak Subotica)
20	MF	Ghana	Obeng Regan (on loan to (Croatia) Inter Zaprešić)
36	GK	Serbia	Mihajlo Karadžić (to Voždovac)
18	MF	Serbia	Nemanja Obradović (to (Ukraine) Stal Kamianske)
51	FW	Serbia	Ognjen Ožegović (to Partizan)

=== Spartak Subotica ===
In: Note: Flags indicate national team as defined under FIFA eligibility rules; some limited exceptions apply. Players may hold more than one non-FIFA nationality.

No.	Pos.	Nation	Player
5	DF	Serbia	Dejan Kerkez (loan return from ČSK Čelarevo)
3	MF	Japan	Noboru Shimura (from (Montenegro) Sutjeska Nikšić)
18	MF	Serbia	David Dunđerski (from Vojvodina)
14	DF	Serbia	Stefan Hajdin (from Radnički NP)
21	DF	Montenegro	Andrija Vukčević (from (Spain) Sevilla Atlético)
29	FW	Serbia	Bojan Čečarić (from Mladost Lučani)
—	MF	Serbia	Uroš Vukićević (from Čukarički, to youth team)
—		Serbia	Vido Marković (from Vrbas, to youth team)
11	FW	Montenegro	Andjelo Rudović (from (Montenegro) Petrovac)
7	FW	Serbia	Luka Belić (from (Slovenia) Celje)
—	DF	Serbia	Ivan Tomac (from (Slovenia) Maribor, to youth team)
70	FW	Serbia	Sava Petrov (from Partizan)
—	GK	Serbia	Dino Žužo (loan return from Bačka 1901, previously on loan at Potisje Kanjiža)
—	GK	Serbia	Filip Stančić (loan return from Potisje Kanjiža, to youth team)

Out: Note: Flags indicate national team as defined under FIFA eligibility rules; some limited exceptions apply. Players may hold more than one non-FIFA nationality.

No.	Pos.	Nation	Player
9	MF	Montenegro	Vladimir Jovović (loan return to Red Star Belgrade)
21	DF	Slovenia	Aljaž Krefl (loan return to (Slovenia) Olimpija Ljubljana)
6	DF	Montenegro	Savo Pavićević (retired, became assistant coach)
3	DF	Serbia	Marko Anđić (to Metalac G. M.)
26	FW	Montenegro	Milan Purović (to Radnik Surdulica)
—	FW	Serbia	Aleksandar Crnojački (to Crvena Zvezda NS)
22	DF	Serbia	Nikola Banjac (to (Hungary) STC Salgótarján)
7	FW	Serbia	Ognjen Mudrinski (to Čukarički)
—		Serbia	Aleksandar Babić (to Bečej, was on loan at Tavankut)
11	DF	Serbia	Marko Bašanović (to Bačka BP)
—	MF	Serbia	Miloš Tadić (was on loan, now signed with SFS Borac Paraćin)
—	DF	Serbia	Aleksandar Popović (was on loan, now signed with Bratstvo Prigrevica)
13	FW	Serbia	Igor Antunić (on loan to Bratstvo Prigrevica)
20	FW	Serbia	Bogdan Stamenković (on loan to Bratstvo Prigrevica, was on loan at Bačka 1901)
—	FW	Serbia	Zvonko Jakovljević (to Jedinstvo Paraćin, was on loan at Bačka 1901)
—	FW	Serbia	Marko Varga (on loan to Indeks Novi Sad)
—		Serbia	Nemanja Tomić (on loan to Sloga Temerin)
—	MF	Serbia	Kristijan Poturica (on loan to Potisje Kanjiža)
—		Serbia	Risto Ristić (on loan to Potisje Kanjiža)
—	FW	Serbia	Goran Kozomora (on loan to Potisje Kanjiža)
2	DF	Serbia	Boško Gajić (on loan to Omladinac Novi Banovci)
—	DF	Serbia	Momčilo Arežina (to Bačka 1901)
—		Serbia	Đorđe Glišović (to Bačka 1901)
—	DF	Serbia	Danilo Pejović (was on loan, now signed with Bačka 1901)
—	MF	Serbia	Danijel Zlatković (to Bačka 1901, was on loan at TSC)
—	FW	Serbia	Lazar Jovanović (to Bačka 1901)
—		Serbia	Stefan Simić (to Bačka 1901, was on loan at Potisje Kanjiža)
—	DF	Serbia	Luka Đurović (on loan to Bačka 1901)
17	MF	Serbia	Milivoj Krmar (on loan to Bačka 1901)
—		Serbia	Mihailo Mihailović (on loan to Bačka 1901)
—		Serbia	Mateja Nenadović (on loan to Bačka 1901)
—	MF	Serbia	Marko Stošić (to Vranjska Banja, was on loan at Bačka 1901)
—	FW	Serbia	Saša Besedeš (to Bačka 1901)
—	GK	Serbia	Nemanja Andrijanić (to Napredak Kruševac)
27	DF	Serbia	Dimitrije Tomović (on loan to Bačka 1901)
—	DF	Serbia	Dejan Parezanović (to Sloga Kraljevo, was on loan at OFK Odžaci)
—	FW	Serbia	Milan Đokić (on loan to Moravac Mrštane, was on loan at Bačka 1901, previously on loan at TSC)
—	DF	Serbia	Bojan Bjelobrk (on loan to Potisje Kanjiža, was on loan at Bačka 1901)
25	GK	Serbia	Ivan Dokić (on loan to Bačka 1901)
22	MF	Serbia	Predrag Medić (on loan to Bačka 1901, was on loan at Omladinac Novi Banovci)

=== Rad ===
In: Note: Flags indicate national team as defined under FIFA eligibility rules; some limited exceptions apply. Players may hold more than one non-FIFA nationality.

No.	Pos.	Nation	Player
98	FW	Serbia	Marko Jović (loan return from Žarkovo)
26	GK	Serbia	Dušan Marković (loan return from Žarkovo)
8	MF	Serbia	Marko Stojanović (loan return from Žarkovo)
29	FW	Montenegro	Vule Vujačić (from (Montenegro) Dečić)
55	MF	Serbia	Nenad Lukić (from Zemun)
20	MF	Serbia	Nedeljko Piščević (from Sinđelić Beograd)
34	DF	Montenegro	Igor Zonjić (from (Montenegro) Sutjeska Nikšić)
4	DF	Serbia	Filip Matović (free, last with OFK Beograd)
3	DF	Montenegro	Vladimir Volkov (from Radnički Niš)
89	GK	Montenegro	Bojan Zogović (from Radnički Niš)
—	FW	Montenegro	Božidar Damjanović (from (Montenegro) Bokelj, to youth team)
—	MF	Serbia	Nemanja Tomašević (from Red Star Belgrade, to youth team)
—		Russia	Semen Sheptitsky (from (Russia) Krasnodar, to youth team)
43	MF	Montenegro	Srđan Ajković (from (Montenegro) Grbalj)
22	DF	Serbia	Marko Mijailović (from Red Star Belgrade)
—	FW	Serbia	Lazar Đurović (from Zemun)
21	FW	Serbia	Luka Ratković (from (Cyprus) Apollon Limassol)
77	DF	Serbia	Zoran Rendulić (from (Kazakhstan) Ordabasy)
88	MF	Montenegro	Žarko Grbović (from (Spain) Toledo)
19	DF	Serbia	Strahinja Tanasijević (from Žarkovo)
—	MF	Austria	Saša Lazić (from (Austria) First Vienna)
80	MF	Serbia	Nebojša Marinković (free, last with (Australia) Perth Glory)

Out: Note: Flags indicate national team as defined under FIFA eligibility rules; some limited exceptions apply. Players may hold more than one non-FIFA nationality.

No.	Pos.	Nation	Player
50	DF	Serbia	Miloš Radivojević (to (Israel) Ironi Kiryat Shmona)
20	DF	Montenegro	Vladimir Rodić (loan return to (Turkey) Kardemir)
8	MF	Serbia	Milan Ćulum (to (Bosnia and Herzegovina) Sloboda Tuzla)
19	FW	Serbia	Dejan Đenić (to Zemun)
21	DF	Serbia	Tomislav Pajović (to Zemun)
—	DF	Serbia	Ivan Kričak (was on loan, now signed with Sinđelić Beograd)
—	FW	Serbia	Georgije Ilić (was on loan, now signed with ČSK Čelarevo)
11	FW	Serbia	Milorad Dabić (to (Czech Republic) Vyškov, was on loan at Sinđelić Beograd)
32	MF	Serbia	Nikola Dimitrijević (to Budućnost Dobanovci)
4	DF	Serbia	Strahinja Bačanin (released)
26	GK	Serbia	Nenad Filipović (to Mačva Šabac)
80	GK	Serbia	Marko Lazarević (to (Portugal) Arouca)
91	GK	Serbia	Nikola Mirković (to (Greece) Atromitos)
77	FW	Serbia	Borko Veselinović (to Zlatibor)
3	DF	Serbia	Luka Petrović (on loan to Dinamo Pančevo, was on loan at Žarkovo)
70	FW	Serbia	Duško Petković (to Žarkovo)
44	MF	Serbia	Filip Bainović (to Red Star Belgrade)
—	FW	Serbia	Momčilo Krstić (to Žarkovo)
—	FW	Serbia	Veljko Trifunović (on loan to Žarkovo)
—	MF	Serbia	Aleksandar Busnić (on loan to Bežanija, previously brought from Žarkovo)
—	MF	South Korea	Joon-Hyo Son (on loan to Bežanija, previously brought from (Croatia) Dugo Selo)
2	DF	Serbia	Matija Košanin (to Radnički Obrenovac, was on loan at IMT)
—	DF	Serbia	Aleksandar Leđanac (to Inđija)
—	MF	Serbia	Veljko Roganović (on loan to Omladinac Novi Banovci)
—	FW	Serbia	Luka Mihajlović (on loan to Omladinac Novi Banovci)
—		Serbia	Ognjen Bodlović (was on loan, now signed with Dinamo Pančevo)
25	DF	Serbia	Nikola Maraš (to (Portugal) Chaves)
55	DF	Serbia	Stevan Bates (retired)

=== Radnik Surdulica ===
In: Note: Flags indicate national team as defined under FIFA eligibility rules; some limited exceptions apply. Players may hold more than one non-FIFA nationality.

No.	Pos.	Nation	Player
9	FW	Montenegro	Milan Purović (from Spartak Subotica)
25	MF	Serbia	Miloš Plavšić (from Novi Pazar)
5	DF	Serbia	Filip Ivanović (from Inđija)
4	DF	Serbia	Radoš Bulatović (from Radnički Niš)
14	MF	Serbia	Nemanja Mirosavljević (from Omladinac Novi Banovci)
26	DF	Serbia	Aleksandar Tanasin (free, last with Borac Čačak)
23	MF	Serbia	Dušan Mićić (from (Uzbekistan) Bunyodkor)
6	MF	Serbia	Dušan Pantelić (from Novi Pazar)
19	FW	Serbia	Miloš Podunavac (from (Croatia) Lokomotiva Zagreb)
24	MF	Serbia	Miloš Mijić (from Metalac G. M.)
28	MF	Serbia	Ivan Marković (from Voždovac)

Out: Note: Flags indicate national team as defined under FIFA eligibility rules; some limited exceptions apply. Players may hold more than one non-FIFA nationality.

No.	Pos.	Nation	Player
25	DF	Serbia	Dragan Žarković (loan return to Napredak Kruševac)
4	MF	Montenegro	Nedeljko Vlahović (to (Montenegro) Mladost Podgorica)
—	MF	Serbia	Stefan Ristić (released)
18	FW	Serbia	Miloš Trifunović (to Mladost Lučani)
14	FW	Montenegro	Mladen Vukasović (to OFK Odžaci)
—	MF	Austria	Dejan Nešović (to (Austria) Horn)
—	MF	China	Yuan Xue (to (Montenegro) Dečić)
6	MF	Serbia	Lazar Ivić (to Mačva Šabac)
8	MF	Serbia	Miloš Adamović (to Mačva Šabac)
26	DF	Serbia	Slobodan Vuković (to Zemun)
23	MF	Montenegro	Savo Gazivoda (to Radnički Niš)
24	DF	Serbia	Milan Milinković (released)
20	MF	Serbia	Nemanja Arsenijević (released)
19	MF	Serbia	Ivan Đorić (to Bačka BP)
—		Serbia	Miljan Petković (to Vlasina)
8	MF	Serbia	Milan Stojanović (on loan to Car Konstantin, was on loan at Temnić)
18	FW	Serbia	Zulfiu Iljasa (on loan to Ozren, was on loan Pukovac)
5	DF	Serbia	Nemanja Anđelković (to ČSK Čelarevo)
16	FW	Serbia	Jovan Jovanović (on loan to Novi Pazar)

=== Bačka BP ===
In: Note: Flags indicate national team as defined under FIFA eligibility rules; some limited exceptions apply. Players may hold more than one non-FIFA nationality.

No.	Pos.	Nation	Player
—	DF	Serbia	Nikola Jovanović (from Dinamo Vranje)
12	GK	Serbia	Ivan Lučić (from FAP)
20	MF	Serbia	Dino Šarac (from Napredak Kruševac)
14	FW	Serbia	Luka Mićić (from BSK Batajnica)
8	MF	Serbia	Miroslav Bjeloš (from (Costa Rica) Limón)
24	MF	Serbia	Ivan Đorić (from Radnik Surdulica)
23	MF	Serbia	Milan Spremo (from Vojvodina)
26	DF	Serbia	Miloš Živković (from Radnički Niš)
3	DF	Serbia	Marko Bašanović (from Spartak Subotica)
29	FW	Nigeria	Okosi Edhere (from (Nigeria) Ikorodu United)
—		Serbia	Nikola Varga (from Vrbas, to youth team)
—		Serbia	Marko Borojević (from ČSK Čelarevo, to youth team)
25	MF	Serbia	Uglješa Radinović (from (Bosnia and Herzegovina) Željezničar Sarajevo)

Out: Note: Flags indicate national team as defined under FIFA eligibility rules; some limited exceptions apply. Players may hold more than one non-FIFA nationality.

No.	Pos.	Nation	Player
7	FW	Serbia	Filip Bajić (to Napredak Kruševac)
16	FW	Ghana	Bismarck Appiah (to Mladost Lučani)
23	DF	Serbia	Damjan Rodić (was on loan now signed for Radnički Šid)
14	DF	Serbia	Igor Đurić (released)
—	DF	Serbia	Milivoje Mušikić (to Proleter Novi Sad, was on loan at Radnički Šid)
12	GK	Serbia	Nenad Mitrović (on loan to Radnički Šid, was on loan at Žarkovo)
—	FW	Serbia	Mladen Plavanski (to Krila Krajine, was on loan at Radnički Šid)
24	DF	Serbia	Luka Miljević (to Cement Beočin)
6	MF	Serbia	Ivan Rogač (to Inđija)
33	GK	Serbia	Dejan Stanivuković (to Proleter Novi Sad, previously brought from Inđija)
19	FW	Serbia	Marko Zečević (released, previously brought from Javor Ivanjica)
28	DF	Serbia	Bojan Mlađović (to Inđija, previously brought from Teleoptik)
—	FW	Serbia	Marko Marčeta (to Budućnost Mladenovo)
3	DF	Serbia	Dušan Mijić (to TSC)
27	MF	Montenegro	Darko Bošković (to OFK Odžaci)
22	MF	Serbia	Strahinja Macanović (released)
17	MF	Serbia	Uroš Stepanović (to Novi Pazar)
1	GK	Russia	Ivan Konovalov (to (Belarus) Torpedo-BelAZ)
17	FW	Serbia	Stevan Račić (to (Albania) Kamza, previously brought from (Malta) Pembroke Athleta)
16	DF	Serbia	Luka Slijepčević (to OFK Odžaci, previously brought from Cement Beočin)
11	FW	Serbia	Milan Stavrić (released)

=== Borac Čačak ===
In: Note: Flags indicate national team as defined under FIFA eligibility rules; some limited exceptions apply. Players may hold more than one non-FIFA nationality.

No.	Pos.	Nation	Player
—	FW	Serbia	Lazar Jolović (loan return from Polet Ljubić)
8	MF	Serbia	Dušan Kuveljić (from Proleter Vranovo)
32	DF	Serbia	Lazar Pajović (from Novi Pazar)
25	MF	Serbia	Stefan Janković (from BSK Borča)
15	DF	Serbia	Miloš Perišić (from Partizan)
26	FW	Serbia	Nemanja Perić (free, last with Partizan)
2	DF	Serbia	Njegoš Janjušević (from Jedinstvo Putevi)
23	GK	Serbia	Vladimir Bajić (from Radnički Niš)
33	MF	Serbia	Uroš Stamenić (from Vojvodina)
30	FW	Montenegro	Filip Vorotović (from (Slovenia) Olimpija Ljubljana)
12	FW	Serbia	Lazar Romanić (on loan from Red Star Belgrade)
34	MF	Serbia	Saša Filipović (from (Armenia) Alashkert)
35	DF	Serbia	Vladimir Otašević (from Metalac G. M.)
—		Serbia	Ilija Zekavica (from Sloboda Čačak, to youth team)
13	DF	Serbia	Jovica Vasilić (from Novi Pazar)
14	DF	Bosnia and Herzegovina	Amer Dupovac (from (Croatia) Split)
21	FW	Brazil	Mateus Lima (from (Brazil) Santos)
31	FW	Serbia	Vanja Vučićević (on loan from Red Star Belgrade)
—	MF	China	Zhong Haoran (from Proleter Novi Sad)
3	MF	Montenegro	Jovan Čađenović (from Zemun)
—	MF	Serbia	Nemanja Bosančić (from Inđija)
16	FW	North Macedonia	Destan Haciya (from (North Macedonia) Makedonija Gj. P.)
1	FW	Serbia	Filip Knežević (from Vojvodina)

Out: Note: Flags indicate national team as defined under FIFA eligibility rules; some limited exceptions apply. Players may hold more than one non-FIFA nationality.

No.	Pos.	Nation	Player
14	MF	Serbia	Zoran Kostić (retired)
5	DF	Serbia	Sreten Sretenović (released)
6	DF	Bosnia and Herzegovina	Nemanja Janičić (to (Bosnia and Herzegovina) Borac Banja Luka)
19	DF	Serbia	Stefan Drašković (to (Moldova) Dacia Chișinău)
3	DF	Serbia	Nenad Kočović (to Loznica)
55	FW	Serbia	Bratislav Punoševac (to (Moldova) Dacia Chișinău)
30	FW	Serbia	Stefan Mihajlović (to Vojvodina)
20	FW	Brazil	Tiago Galvão (to (Portugal) Chaves)
1	GK	Serbia	Branimir Aleksić (released)
12	GK	Serbia	Nenad Jovanović (to Trayal)
13	MF	Serbia	Milan Marčić (to Javor Ivanjica)
—	DF	Serbia	Igor Vukomanović (to LFK Mladost Lučani, was on loan at Vojvodina)
—	DF	Serbia	Veljko Đukanović (to Prijevor)
—	GK	Serbia	Marko Drobnjak (was on loan, now signed with Polet Ljubić)
—	MF	Serbia	Stefan Kovačević (on loan to Polet Ljubić, previously brought from Inđija)
16	MF	Serbia	Stefan Fićović (on loan to Polet Ljubić)
22	DF	Serbia	Dušan Đorđević (loan extension to Polet Ljubić)
—	DF	Serbia	Srđan Pantelić (on loan to Polet Ljubić)
21	MF	Serbia	Uroš Sekulić (on loan to Polet Ljubić, previously brought from Brodarac)
30	MF	Serbia	Nikola Mitić (to Javor Ivanjica, previously brought from Dinamo Vranje)
—	GK	Serbia	Nikola Tasić (on loan to IMT, previously brought from Sloboda Užice)
—	DF	Serbia	Milan Matović (loan extension to Polet Ljubić)
9	FW	Serbia	Dragoljub Anđelković (to Grafičar Beograd)
—	DF	Serbia	Deni Pavlović (to Novi Pazar, previously brought from Mačva Šabac)
14	DF	Serbia	Dušan Ivanov (to (Slovenia) Radomlje)
—	FW	Russia	Daur Chanba (to Lokomotiva Beograd, previously bought from the same club)
18	MF	Serbia	Nemanja Stanković (released, was on loan at Polet Ljubić)
33	MF	Serbia	Boris Živanović (released)

=== Mačva Šabac ===
In: Note: Flags indicate national team as defined under FIFA eligibility rules; some limited exceptions apply. Players may hold more than one non-FIFA nationality.

No.	Pos.	Nation	Player
—		Serbia	Miloš Radovanović (loan return from Jevremovac, to youth team)
1	GK	Serbia	Nenad Filipović (from Rad)
3	DF	Serbia	Radoš Protić (from Mladost Lučani)
4	MF	Serbia	Lazar Ivić (from Radnik Surdulica)
20	MF	Serbia	Miloš Adamović (from Radnik Surdulica)
21	MF	Serbia	Jordan Jovanović (from Javor Ivanjica)
63	FW	Serbia	Lazar Vladisavljević (from Budućnost Dobanovci)
14	DF	North Macedonia	Bojan Gjorgievski (from (North Macedonia) Pobeda Prilep)
29	MF	Serbia	Marko Đurišić (from Vojvodina)
7	MF	Serbia	Filip Arsenijević (from (Greece) AEEK INKA)
12	FW	Serbia	Nenad Gavrić (from Mladost Lučani)
99	FW	Serbia	Petar Gigić (from OFK Beograd)
23	DF	Serbia	David Hrubik (from (Switzerland) Lausanne-Sport)

Out: Note: Flags indicate national team as defined under FIFA eligibility rules; some limited exceptions apply. Players may hold more than one non-FIFA nationality.

No.	Pos.	Nation	Player
1	GK	Serbia	Mitar Pejović (to Kolubara)
7	FW	Serbia	Marko Stančetić (to Kolubara)
—	DF	Serbia	Darko Isailović (loan extension to Provo)
—		Serbia	Dušan Nikolić (loan extension to Provo)
—		Serbia	Nikola Vasić (loan extension to Provo)
4	MF	Bosnia and Herzegovina	Nemanja Matović (to Radnički Pirot)
23	MF	Serbia	Nemanja Milovanović (to Dinamo Vranje)
21	FW	Serbia	Ognjen Damnjanović (to TSC)
—	MF	Serbia	Nikša Vujčić (to Provo)
—	DF	Serbia	Nikola Milutinović (to Provo)
29	DF	Serbia	Mirko Đermanović (to Budućnost Krušik)
—	MF	Serbia	Filip Blagojević (to Budućnost Krušik)
—	MF	Serbia	Nenad Bojić (to Radnički SM)
—	FW	Serbia	Marko Bojić (to Partizan Vitojevci)
—	DF	Serbia	Vladimir Tomić (on loan to Železničar Lajkovac)
—	DF	Serbia	Deni Pavlović (to Borac Čačak)
—	GK	Serbia	Zdravko Vasić (to Provo)
5	DF	Serbia	Nemanja Živković (on loan to Jedinstvo Putevi)
—	FW	Serbia	Veljko Zlatarić (to Jevremovac)
—		Serbia	Dejan Zrnić (was on loan, now signed with Radnički Šabački)
—		Serbia	Stefan Vasić (to Karađorđe Mišar)
94	MF	Serbia	Nemanja Ahčin (to Inđija)
77	MF	Bosnia and Herzegovina	Nemanja Lekanić (to Sinđelić Beograd)
—	MF	Serbia	Matija Miketić (on loan to IMT, previously brought from (Slovenia) Zavrč)
—	MF	Serbia	Ognjen Lekić (to Sloga Bogosavac)
88	GK	Serbia	Miloš Savić (was on loan, now signed for Dunav Prahovo)
—	FW	Serbia	Ivan Mijailović (on loan to Crvena zvezda NS, was on loan at Zlatibor)
11	MF	Serbia	Stevan Živković (to (Armenia) Gandzasar Kapan)

=== Zemun ===
In: Note: Flags indicate national team as defined under FIFA eligibility rules; some limited exceptions apply. Players may hold more than one non-FIFA nationality.

No.	Pos.	Nation	Player
—	GK	Serbia	Dušan Stegnjaja (loan return from Novi Beograd, to youth team)
—		Serbia	Stefan Kanazir (loan return from Milutinac)
—		Serbia	Filip Pantelić (loan return from Milutinac)
—		Serbia	Luka Kapetanović (loan return from Milutinac)
—		Serbia	Vojislav Petrović (loan return from Milutinac)
26	DF	Serbia	Slobodan Vuković (from Radnik Surdulica)
4	MF	Serbia	Pavle Popara (from Radnički Niš)
9	FW	Serbia	Dejan Đenić (from Rad)
7	MF	Serbia	Elmir Asani (from Voždovac)
1	GK	Serbia	Marko Milošević (from Voždovac)
14	MF	Lithuania	Justas Lasickas (on loan from (Lithuania) Žalgiris)
32	DF	Serbia	Tomislav Pajović (from Rad)
33	MF	Serbia	Nemanja Mladenović (from (Norway) Bodø/Glimt)
28	MF	Bosnia and Herzegovina	Nenad Kiso (from (Bosnia and Herzegovina) Olimpik Sarajevo)
3	FW	Serbia	Miroslav Lečić (from Jagodina)
20	FW	Finland	Lauri Dalla Valle (free, last with (England) Crewe Alexandra)
30	DF	Serbia	Branislav Trajković (free, last with (Kazakhstan) Ordabasy)
25	DF	Serbia	Mihailo Milutinović (from (Hungary) Mezőkövesd)
50	GK	Serbia	Bojan Šaranov (from (Azerbaijan) Qarabağ)
—	FW	Serbia	Nikola Savić (from Jagodina, to youth team)
16	FW	Canada	Aleksa Marković (loan return from Inđija, previously on loan at Brodarac 1947)

Out: Note: Flags indicate national team as defined under FIFA eligibility rules; some limited exceptions apply. Players may hold more than one non-FIFA nationality.

No.	Pos.	Nation	Player
—	DF	Bosnia and Herzegovina	Slaviša Radović (to (Bosnia and Herzegovina) Radnik Bijeljina)
—	MF	Serbia	Uroš Ljubomirac (to (Malta) Balzan)
—	MF	Serbia	Risto Ristović (to (Montenegro) Budućnost Podgorica)
—	GK	Serbia	Aleksandar Kirovski (to Čukarički)
—	MF	Serbia	Igor Stanojević (to (Armenia) Shirak)
—	DF	Bosnia and Herzegovina	Željko Đokić (released)
—	MF	Serbia	Nemanja Grujić (to TSC)
—	FW	Georgia	Davit Volkovi (to (Georgia (country)) Saburtalo Tbilisi)
—	MF	Serbia	Nenad Lukić (to Rad)
—	DF	Serbia	Ivan Šubert (to Novi Pazar)
—	MF	Bosnia and Herzegovina	Amer Osmanagić (to (Bosnia and Herzegovina) Sloboda Tuzla)
—	MF	Serbia	Miloš Čudić (to (Bosnia and Herzegovina) Borac Banja Luka)
—		Serbia	Aleksa Paranosić (was on loan, now signed with Milutinac)
—	FW	Serbia	Vladimir Radočaj (to Milutinac)
—	FW	Serbia	Aleksandar Miodragović (to Omladinac Novi Banovci)
—	MF	Serbia	Mladen Preradović (to Grafičar Beograd, was on loan at Dorćol)
—		Serbia	Nenad Gavrilović (to Bežanija, was on loan at Milutinac)
—	DF	Serbia	Aleksa Milošević (loan extension to Milutinac)
—		Serbia	Stefan Pavić (loan extension to Milutinac)
—	GK	Serbia	Predrag Kovačević (loan extension to Milutinac)
25	DF	Serbia	Marko Nikolić (on loan to Inđija, previously brought from Omladinac Novi Banovci)
—	FW	Serbia	Lazar Đurović (to Rad)
—	MF	Serbia	Luka Bilanović (to KMF FON, was on loan at Milutinac)
10	MF	Serbia	Stefan Milosavljević (to Mladost Lučani)
21	DF	Serbia	Stefan Jovanović (to Mladost Lučani)
8	MF	Montenegro	Jovan Čađenović (to Borac Čačak, previously brought from Partizan)
—	FW	Serbia	Marko Jakšić (to Šumadija Aranđelovac)
—		Serbia	Stefan Stašić (to Sopot)
—	MF	Serbia	Bogdan Mirić (on loan to Stepojevac Vaga)
—	MF	Sierra Leone	Mustapha Bangura (to (Greece) Rodos)
—		Serbia	Nemanja Mratinković (to Žarkovo, was on loan at Milutinac)

== Serbian First League ==
=== Metalac G. M. ===
In: Note: Flags indicate national team as defined under FIFA eligibility rules; some limited exceptions apply. Players may hold more than one non-FIFA nationality.

No.	Pos.	Nation	Player
4	DF	Serbia	Bojan Gočanin (loan return from Karađorđe Topola)
10	DF	Serbia	Marko Anđić (from Spartak Subotica)
9	FW	Serbia	Marko Rajković (from Kolubara)
18	FW	Serbia	Andrija Ratković (from Karađorđe Topola)
—	GK	Montenegro	Milan Jelovac (from (Montenegro) Ibar Rožaje)
3	MF	Serbia	Milan Svojić (from (Greece) Kalloni)
23	DF	Serbia	Boris Milekić (from (Poland) Stal Mielec)
99	FW	Nigeria	Augustine Nwagwu (from Austria Klagenfurt)
77	FW	Nigeria	Eze Okeuhie (free, last with (Tunisia) Bizertin)

Out: Note: Flags indicate national team as defined under FIFA eligibility rules; some limited exceptions apply. Players may hold more than one non-FIFA nationality.

No.	Pos.	Nation	Player
10	FW	Serbia	Ivica Jovanović (to (Iceland) Vikingur Reykjavik)
9	MF	Montenegro	Miloš Krkotić (to (Montenegro) Mladost Podgorica)
3	MF	Serbia	Stefan Panić (to (Czech Republic) Baník Ostrava)
25	DF	Serbia	Saša Nikodijević (to (Bosnia and Herzegovina) Krupa)
5	MF	Serbia	Božidar Veškovac (to OFK Beograd)
18	MF	Serbia	Miloš Mijić (to Radnik Surdulica)
33	GK	Serbia	Nemanja Belić (to Čukarički)
15	DF	Serbia	Vladimir Otašević (to Borac Čačak)
—	FW	Serbia	Nikola Grbović (on loan to Budućnost Krušik)
—	MF	Serbia	Nemanja Kruševac (to Sloga Kraljevo)
—	GK	Serbia	Mattia Miljojković (to Napredak Kruševac)
—	FW	Serbia	Andrija Đunisijević (on loan to Karađorđe Topola)
—	MF	Serbia	Njegoš Drecun (to Stepojevac Vaga)
23	MF	Serbia	Aleksandar Martinović (on loan to Loznica)
—	GK	Bosnia and Herzegovina	Čedomir Radić (to (Bosnia and Herzegovina) Podrinje Janja)
—		Serbia	Emil Bugarin (to Dunav Novi Slankamen)
11	FW	Serbia	Marko Nikolić (on loan to Stepojevac Vaga)
99	FW	Ecuador	Walberto Caicedo (to (Ecuador) Guayaquil City)

=== Novi Pazar ===
In: Note: Flags indicate national team as defined under FIFA eligibility rules; some limited exceptions apply. Players may hold more than one non-FIFA nationality.

No.	Pos.	Nation	Player
27	GK	Serbia	Jasmin Koč (loan return from Jošanica)
24	MF	Serbia	Denis Ristov (from Radnički Pirot)
15	MF	Serbia	Stefan Marković (from Radnički Pirot)
5	DF	Serbia	Ivan Šubert (from Zemun)
13	GK	Bosnia and Herzegovina	Goran Vukliš (from OFK Beograd)
2	DF	Serbia	Predrag Đorđević (from OFK Beograd)
9	FW	Serbia	Jovan Mihajlović (from Jošanica)
44	MF	Serbia	Amel Lakota (from Jošanica)
—	MF	Serbia	Emir Hazirović (from Jošanica)
88	MF	Serbia	Ensar Bajramlić (from Jošanica)
—	FW	Serbia	Sead Hadžibulić (from (Montenegro) Iskra Danilovgrad)
8	MF	Serbia	Kenan Ragipović (from (Montenegro) Petrovac)
19	DF	Serbia	Stefan Radovanović (from (Montenegro) Petrovac)
31	MF	Bosnia and Herzegovina	Dejan Vukomanović (from (Bosnia and Herzegovina) Olimpik Sarajevo)
—	DF	Serbia	Luka Šarac (from (Germany) Viktoria Berlin)
7	FW	Serbia	Marko Simić (from Mladost Lučani)
20	FW	Serbia	Jovan Jovanović (on loan from Radnik Surdulica)
22	DF	Serbia	Deni Pavlović (from Borac Čačak)
18	MF	Serbia	Uroš Stepanović (from Bačka BP)
10	MF	Serbia	Marko Vučetić (from (North Macedonia) Bregalnica Štip)

Out: Note: Flags indicate national team as defined under FIFA eligibility rules; some limited exceptions apply. Players may hold more than one non-FIFA nationality.

No.	Pos.	Nation	Player
54	DF	Serbia	Milan Savić (to (Malta) Balzan)
32	FW	Serbia	Ivan Marković (to Mladost Lučani)
10	MF	Serbia	Stefan Milojević (to (Finland) KPV)
25	GK	Serbia	Miloš Budaković (released)
11	FW	Serbia	Aleksandar Đoković (to (Armenia) Banants)
57	MF	Serbia	Miloš Plavšić (to Radnik Surdulica)
23	GK	Serbia	Mladen Živković (to Radnički Niš)
55	DF	Serbia	Aleksandar Ignjatović (to (Bosnia and Herzegovina) Sloboda Tuzla)
9	FW	Serbia	Mladen Popović (to (Montenegro) Petrovac)
21	DF	Serbia	Lazar Pajović (to Borac Čačak)
8	MF	Serbia	Dušan Pantelić (to Radnik Surdulica)
84	MF	Austria	Kenan Muslimović (to (Germany) Kaiserslautern II)
77	DF	Serbia	Slavko Marić (to Mladost Lučani)
17	FW	Serbia	Mirza Delimeđac (to Jošanica)
97	GK	Serbia	Pavle Nićiforović (loan extension to Jošanica)
19	DF	Serbia	Ervin Kačar (to (North Macedonia) Pobeda Prilep)
29	FW	Serbia	Nenad Perović (to Dunav Stari Banovci)
3	DF	Serbia	Ermin Ibrahimović (on loan to Tutin, was on loan at Jošanica)
—	GK	Serbia	Tamer Preljević (on loan to Tutin)
24	DF	Serbia	Srđa Knežević (to Žarkovo)
13	MF	Serbia	Dejan Babić (to Bežanija)
4	DF	Serbia	Aleksandar Tasić (to (Moldova) Speranța Nisporeni)
2	DF	Serbia	Jovica Vasilić (to Borac Čačak)
5	MF	Serbia	Miljan Mutavdžić (to Bane Raška)
88	MF	Serbia	Miloš Krstić (to OFK Beograd)

=== Sloboda Užice ===
In: Note: Flags indicate national team as defined under FIFA eligibility rules; some limited exceptions apply. Players may hold more than one non-FIFA nationality.

No.	Pos.	Nation	Player
31	DF	Serbia	Nikola Vučković (loan return from Jedinstvo Putevi)
—	DF	Serbia	Đorđe Caković (from OFK Beograd, to youth team)
21	FW	Serbia	Nemanja Plećić (from Želeničar Lajkovac)
7	MF	Serbia	Igor Krmar (from Bežanija)
23	DF	Serbia	Aleksandar Cvetić (from Dorćol)
6	MF	Serbia	Darko Stanojević (from Loznica)
4	DF	Montenegro	Ognjen Peličić (from Brodarac)
13	MF	Bosnia and Herzegovina	Milan Mirić (from Čukarički)
33	FW	Serbia	Dejan Đorđević (free, last with Zemun)
9	FW	Serbia	Milan Perić (from TSC)
8	MF	Serbia	Aleksandar Janković (from (Slovakia) Lokomotíva Zvolen)
79	MF	Serbia	Nemanja Stošković (from (Armenia) Shirak)
55	MF	Serbia	Velibor Perućica (from (Czech Republic) Třebíč)
—	DF	South Korea	Shim Tae-soo (from (South Korea) Hanyang University)
25	GK	Serbia	Dušan Čubraković (from BASK)
88	MF	Serbia	Aleksandar Alempijević (free, last with (Uzbekistan) Bunyodkor)
17	FW	Serbia	Nikola Stojanović (from (Romania) Gaz Metan Mediaș)
22	FW	England	Benjamin Agyeman-Badu (from (England) Blackpool)
14	MF	Zimbabwe	Tinotenda Chibharo (from (England) Liversedge)
16	FW	Nigeria	Peter Kolawole (from (Saudi Arabia) Damac)

Out: Note: Flags indicate national team as defined under FIFA eligibility rules; some limited exceptions apply. Players may hold more than one non-FIFA nationality.

No.	Pos.	Nation	Player
55	FW	Bosnia and Herzegovina	Uroš Đerić (to Napredak Kruševac)
15	MF	Montenegro	Boris Došljak (to (Montenegro) Iskra Danilovgrad)
1	GK	Serbia	Nikola Tasić (to Borac Čačak)
11	DF	Serbia	Milan Joksimović (to (Belarus) Gorodeya)
66	FW	Serbia	Igor Vučićević (to Budućnost Arilje, was on loan at Zlatibor Čajetina)
7	FW	Nigeria	Emeka Emerun (to Radnički Pirot)
25	GK	Serbia	Luka Radojičić (to Sloga Požega, was on loan at Zlatibor Čajetina)
—	MF	Serbia	Nikola Šalipur (was on loan, now signed with FAP)
23	DF	Serbia	Bogdan Miličić (to Zlatibor)
—		Serbia	Aleksandar Savić (to Zlatibor)
88	MF	Serbia	Branislav Stanić (released)
20	MF	Serbia	Aleksandar Mitrović (loan extension to Zlatibor)
14	MF	Serbia	Luka Slavković (to Polet Ljubić)
8	FW	Serbia	Dobrivoje Velemir (to Cement Beočin)
9	FW	Serbia	Branko Radović (to Jedinstvo Putevi)
—	DF	Serbia	Nemanja Cvetković (to Jedinstvo Putevi, previously brought from Čukarički)
17	MF	Serbia	Nenad Cvetković (to Jedinstvo Putevi)
—		Serbia	Ognjen Petrović (to Zlatibor)
79	MF	Serbia	Milan Jeremić (to Dinamo Vranje)
4	MF	Serbia	Aleksa Vujić (to Karađorđe Topola)

=== Inđija ===
In: Note: Flags indicate national team as defined under FIFA eligibility rules; some limited exceptions apply. Players may hold more than one non-FIFA nationality.

No.	Pos.	Nation	Player
13	FW	Serbia	Nikola Mojsilović (free, last with Bačka BP)
5	DF	Serbia	Filip Ungar (from (Slovakia) Dukla Banská Bystrica)
—	MF	Serbia	Vojin Puzić (from Sloven Ruma)
24	MF	Serbia	Boško Vraštanović (from Radnički Obrenovac)
21	FW	Serbia	Željko Žerađanin (from BSK Borča)
12	GK	Serbia	Nemanja Jeveričić (from Sloga Požega)
6	DF	Croatia	Predrag Počuča (from BSK Borča)
—	FW	Serbia	Stefan Ilić (from Čukarički)
—	DF	Serbia	Stefan Kostić (from Vojvodina)
—	GK	Serbia	Dušan Vojvodić (from Vojvodina)
—		Serbia	Miloš Tepavčević (from Vojvodina)
22	MF	Serbia	Ivan Rogač (from Bačka BP)
14	DF	Serbia	Bojan Mlađović (from Bačka BP)
4	MF	Serbia	Nemanja Ahčin (from Mačva Šabac)
18	FW	Serbia	Ognjen Bjeličić (from Sinđelić Beograd)
2	DF	Serbia	Marko Nikolić (on loan from Zemun)
—	GK	Serbia	Luka Radotić (from Čukarički)
—	DF	Serbia	Aleksandar Leđanac (from Rad)
23	FW	Serbia	Dušan Stoiljković (from (Slovenia) Radomlje)
—	GK	Serbia	Rastko Šuljagić (free, last with (Germany) Stuttgart II)

Out: Note: Flags indicate national team as defined under FIFA eligibility rules; some limited exceptions apply. Players may hold more than one non-FIFA nationality.

No.	Pos.	Nation	Player
5	DF	Serbia	Vladimir Simunović (to Radnički Niš)
22	FW	Serbia	Darko Lemajić (to (Latvia) Riga)
13	DF	Serbia	Filip Ivanović (to Radnik Surdulica)
1	GK	Serbia	Dejan Stanivuković (to Bačka BP)
4	DF	Serbia	Slobodan Lalić (to TSC)
2	MF	Serbia	Dino Dolmagić (to (Iceland) Breiðablik)
20	MF	Serbia	Stefan Kovačević (to Borac Čačak)
—		Serbia	Bojan Dizdarević (to Jedinstvo SP)
—	DF	Serbia	Nikola Đurić (to Kabel)
16	MF	Serbia	Marko Bičkeji (to Borac Novi Sad)
21	DF	Serbia	Damjan Todorović (to ČSK Čelarevo)
—	MF	Serbia	Peđa Zvekan (to Hajduk Beška)
—		Serbia	Danilo Živanović (to Hajduk Beška)
—	GK	Russia	Igor Sveshnikov (to Železničar Inđija)
—		Serbia	Slobodan Grković (to Železničar Inđija)
—	FW	Serbia	Miloš Savanović (to Borac Sakule, was on loan at Radnički Zrenjanin)
—	GK	Serbia	Miloš Blagojević (to Hajduk Beška)
—		Serbia	Nikola Ostojić (to Sloven Ruma)
—		Serbia	Miloš Čiča (to Slavija Novi Sad)
18	MF	Serbia	Nemanja Bosančić (to Borac Čačak)
—	FW	Canada	Aleksa Marković (loan return to Zemun)

=== Bežanija ===
In: Note: Flags indicate national team as defined under FIFA eligibility rules; some limited exceptions apply. Players may hold more than one non-FIFA nationality.

No.	Pos.	Nation	Player
—	DF	Australia	Salvatore Russo (from Lokomotiva Beograd)
19	DF	Serbia	Petar Šušnjar (from Dorćol)
20	MF	Serbia	Milan Jokić (from BSK Borča)
—	MF	Serbia	Nikola Radmanovac (on loan from Napredak Kruševac)
7	MF	Serbia	Damjan Gojkov (on loan from Red Star Belgrade)
17	MF	Serbia	Aleksandar Desančić (from ČSK Čelarevo)
—	MF	Serbia	Mladen Mićanović (from Javor Ivanjica)
—		Serbia	Nenad Gavrilović (from Zemun, to youth team)
1	GK	Armenia	Artem Karapetyan (from (Cyprus) Anagennisi Deryneia)
5	MF	Serbia	Aleksandar Busnić (on loan from Rad)
3	MF	South Korea	Son Joon-hyo (on loan from Rad)
—	MF	Serbia	Dejan Babić (from Novi Pazar)
18	MF	Serbia	Goran Smiljanić (from Hajduk Beška)
13	DF	Serbia	Draško Đorđević (on loan from Red Star Belgrade)
—	FW	Serbia	Stefan Ilić (from Red Star Belgrade)
14	DF	Brazil	Mateus Viveiros (on loan from Red Star Belgrade)
—	DF	Azerbaijan	David Samedov (from BASK)
—	MF	Russia	Nikita Arshinov (from (Russia) Vorobyovy)
—	GK	Serbia	Miško Imro (from OFK Beograd)
—	DF	China	Liu Bin (from (China) Guizhou Zhicheng)

Out: Note: Flags indicate national team as defined under FIFA eligibility rules; some limited exceptions apply. Players may hold more than one non-FIFA nationality.

No.	Pos.	Nation	Player
1	GK	Serbia	Jovan Vićić (loan return to Red Star Belgrade)
16	FW	Serbia	Milan Panović (loan return to Red Star Belgrade)
18	DF	Serbia	Miloš Stojanović (loan return to Red Star Belgrade)
20	DF	Serbia	Marko Mijailović (loan return to Red Star Belgrade)
13	MF	Montenegro	Jovan Čađenović (loan return to Partizan)
—	MF	Serbia	Predrag Veličković (to Dunav Prahovo)
7	MF	Serbia	Igor Krmar (to Sloboda Užice)
—	DF	Serbia	Andrija Mijailović (to Radnički Niš)
—	DF	Serbia	Marko Turan (to (Slovakia) Nová Baňa)
—	FW	Kyrgyzstan	Viktor Kelm (to (Kyrgyzstan) Alay Osh)
3	DF	Serbia	Luka Savićević (to Radnički Beograd)
—	MF	Serbia	Luka Sekulić (on loan to Jedinstvo Surčin)
—	MF	South Korea	Kim Do-hyun (to (Croatia) Dugo Selo, previously brought from (South Korea) Goyang Citizen)

=== Radnički Pirot ===
In: Note: Flags indicate national team as defined under FIFA eligibility rules; some limited exceptions apply. Players may hold more than one non-FIFA nationality.

No.	Pos.	Nation	Player
—	FW	Serbia	Željko Dimitrov (from Dinamo Vranje)
—	DF	Serbia	Bojan Dojkić (from (Greece) Olympiacos Volos)
—	FW	Nigeria	Emeka Emerun (from Sloboda Užice)
—	FW	Serbia	Miloš Živanović (from Dinamo Vranje)
—	MF	Bosnia and Herzegovina	Nemanja Matović (from Mačva Šabac)
—	DF	Serbia	Lazar Anđelković (on loan from Radnički Niš)
—	DF	Serbia	Stefan Mihajlović (from Radnički Niš, to youth team)
—	FW	Serbia	Darko Nikolić (from Vlasina, to youth team)
—	FW	Serbia	Mladen Radenković (on loan from Radnički Niš, to youth team)
—	FW	Serbia	Igor Grkajac (from (Malta) Victoria Wanderers)
—	DF	Serbia	Miloš Rnić (from (Albania) Flamurtari)
—		Serbia	Aleksa Pavlović (loan return from Tanasko Rajić, to youth team)

Out: Note: Flags indicate national team as defined under FIFA eligibility rules; some limited exceptions apply. Players may hold more than one non-FIFA nationality.

No.	Pos.	Nation	Player
8	MF	Serbia	Lazar Čordašić (to TSC)
—	MF	Serbia	Aleksandar Bandić (on loan to Tanasko Rajić)
—		Serbia	Nikola Rančić (to Zadrugar Krupac, was on loan at Lužnica)
—		Serbia	Nikola Manić (to Zadrugar Krupac, was on loan at Lužnica)
13	FW	Serbia	Marko Memedović (to Sloga Kraljevo)
2	DF	Serbia	Miljan Bućković (released)
—	MF	Serbia	Mirko Baroševčić (to Borac Sakule)
—	GK	Serbia	Nikola Savić (on loan to Zaplanjac)
—	MF	Serbia	Stefan Dimitrijević (to Timočanin)
—		Serbia	Jovan Velev (on loan to Tanasko Rajić)
—		Serbia	Filip Đorđev (to Mladost Poljska Ržana)
10	MF	Serbia	Denis Ristov (to Novi Pazar)
4	MF	Serbia	Stefan Marković (to Novi Pazar)
—	GK	Serbia	Nemanja Đorđević (loan extension to Lužnica)
—		Serbia	Miloš Milojević (on loan to Lužnica, was on loan at Jedinstvo Pirot)
—	DF	Serbia	Luka Vasov (on loan to Tanasko Rajić)
—	FW	Serbia	Uroš Đurić (on loan to Tanasko Rajić)
—	MF	Serbia	Igor Kostadinović (on loan to Jedinstvo Bošnjace)
—	GK	Serbia	Boris Dimitrov (was on loan, now signed with Balkanski)
—		Serbia	Nikola Ćirić (on loan to Balkanski, was on loan at Lužnica)
—	DF	Serbia	Marko Davidović (on loan to Balkanski)
—		Serbia	Lazar Filipović (to Senjak Pirot, was on loan at Jedinstvo Pirot)
—		Serbia	Željko Stamenković (to Senjak Pirot, was on loan at Jedinstvo Pirot)
—		Serbia	Lazar Branković (to Senjak Pirot, was on loan at Jedinstvo Pirot)
—	DF	Serbia	Branislav Pešić (to Senjak Pirot, was on loan at Jedinstvo Pirot)
—	GK	Serbia	Igor Nešić (to Hajduk Beška, was on loan at Jedinstvo Pirot)
—	MF	Serbia	Stefan Todorović (on loan to Balkanski, was on loan at Jedinstvo Pirot)
—	FW	Serbia	Miloš Stojanov (on loan to Balkanski)
14	MF	Serbia	Darko Vasić (on loan to Tanasko Rajić)

=== Jagodina ===
In: Note: Flags indicate national team as defined under FIFA eligibility rules; some limited exceptions apply. Players may hold more than one non-FIFA nationality.

No.	Pos.	Nation	Player
31	MF	Serbia	Đorđe Ivljanin (loan return from Tabane)
35	FW	Serbia	Mladen Stoicev (loan return from Sinđelić Niš)
23	MF	Serbia	Marko Radosavljević (loan return from Tabane)
17	MF	Serbia	Aleksa Janjušević (loan return from Tabane)
2	DF	Serbia	Nikola Džolić (loan return from Tabane)
—	GK	Serbia	Nikola Stanimirović (loan return from Levač)

Out: Note: Flags indicate national team as defined under FIFA eligibility rules; some limited exceptions apply. Players may hold more than one non-FIFA nationality.

No.	Pos.	Nation	Player
20	MF	Montenegro	Marko Ilinčić (to (Montenegro) Lovćen)
—	MF	Serbia	Nikola Tasić (released)
—		Serbia	Miloš Radić (was on loan, now signed with Lugomir)
—		Serbia	Jovan Stević (on loan to Lugomir)
7	FW	Serbia	Stanimir Milošković (to (Sweden) Ängelholms FF)
—	DF	Serbia	Marko Žikić (released)
8	FW	Serbia	Srđan Ristić (retired)
—	MF	Serbia	Željko Sofronijević (to Sloga Despotovac, was on loan at Tabane)
—	DF	Serbia	Boban Dobrosavljević (loan extension to Kolare)
26	DF	Montenegro	Momčilo Dulović (to (Montenegro) Mladost Lješkopolje)
—	FW	Serbia	Miloš Živanović (released, was on loan at Sloga Despotovac)
9	FW	Serbia	Andreja Lazović (to Proleter Vranovo)
17	FW	Serbia	Miroslav Lečić (to Zemun)
—	GK	Serbia	Stefan Vasić (to FAP, was on loan at Tabane)
—		Serbia	Aleksandar Kopričanec (to Morava Ćuprija)
—	MF	Serbia	Miljan Milićević (to Morava Ćuprija)
—		Serbia	Aleksandar Tacković (on loan to Tabane)
—		Serbia	Lazar Panić (on loan to Tabane)
—	MF	Serbia	Aleksa Najdanović (on loan to Tabane)
—		Serbia	Lazar Stojanović (on loan to Tabane)
—	FW	Serbia	Luka Milisavljević (loan extension to Tabane)
—		Serbia	Nikola Obradović (on loan to Tabane)
—	GK	Serbia	Lazar Jevremović (on loan to Tabane, was on loan at Sloga Despotovac)
—	DF	Australia	Marko Milutinović (to OFK Beograd, was on loan at Tabane)
35	MF	Serbia	Ivan Marić (to (Malta) Mosta)
91	FW	Serbia	Vladimir Petrović (to (Czech Republic) Prostějov, was on loan at Tabane)
—	FW	Serbia	Ivan Pejčić (to OFK Niš)
—	MF	Serbia	Stevan Marinković (to Voždovac)
—	MF	Serbia	Igor Ivanović (to Napredak Kruševac)
—	GK	Serbia	Veljko Huskić (on loan to Lugomir)
2	DF	Croatia	Duško Dukić (to (Greece) Panargiakos)
3	DF	Serbia	Ivan Miladinović (to Radnički Niš)
—	MF	Japan	Gentaro Murakami (to (Romania) Progresul Pecica)
23	FW	Serbia	Nikola Savić (to Zemun)
—	FW	China	Pan Qi (released)
—	MF	Serbia	Nikola Unković (to Radnički Kragujevac, was on loan at Tabane)

=== Dinamo Vranje ===
In: Note: Flags indicate national team as defined under FIFA eligibility rules; some limited exceptions apply. Players may hold more than one non-FIFA nationality.

No.	Pos.	Nation	Player
8	MF	Serbia	Aleksandar Jović (loan return from Vlasina)
1	GK	Serbia	Dragan Cakić (from Moravac Mrštane)
27	DF	Serbia	Mlađan Stevanović (from (France) Decazeville)
—	MF	Serbia	Aleksandar Mitrović (from Moravac Mrštane)
—	FW	Serbia	Dušan Stamenković (from Car Konstantin)
—	DF	Serbia	Aleksandar Petrović (from Žitorađa)
23	MF	Montenegro	Todor Babović (from Vrčin)
30	MF	Serbia	Saša Manić (from Partizan)
17	MF	Serbia	Veljko Antonijević (from BSK Borča)
18	FW	Serbia	Lazar Ranđelović (on loan from Radnički Niš)
—	DF	Serbia	Marko Bulat (from Brodarac 1947)
21	DF	Serbia	Dušan Mladenović (free, last with (Montenegro) Iskra Danilovgrad)
19	MF	Serbia	Nemanja Milovanović (from Mačva Šabac)
—	MF	Serbia	Milan Milanović (from Red Star Belgrade, to youth squad)
—	FW	Serbia	Nikola Đorđević (from (Slovakia) Košice)
9	FW	Serbia	Lazar Vidić (from Hong Kong Sapling)
7	MF	Serbia	Milan Jeremić (from Sloboda Užice)
26	FW	Serbia	Nikola Stošić (loan return from Moravac Mrštane)

Out: Note: Flags indicate national team as defined under FIFA eligibility rules; some limited exceptions apply. Players may hold more than one non-FIFA nationality.

No.	Pos.	Nation	Player
30	DF	Serbia	Nemanja Ljubisavljević (loan return to Radnički Niš)
9	FW	Serbia	Andrija Majdevac (loan return to Napredak Kruševac)
21	DF	Serbia	Nikola Jovanović (to Bačka BP)
8	MF	Serbia	Nikola Mitić (to Borac Čačak)
10	FW	Serbia	Željko Dimitrov (to Radnički Pirot)
11	FW	Serbia	Miloš Živanović (to Radnički Pirot)
1	GK	Serbia	Janko Langura (to Takovo)
19	FW	Serbia	Bojan Spasojević (to Mladi Borac)
—	MF	Serbia	Uroš Krunić (released)
27	DF	Serbia	Predrag Radojević (to IMT)
—	DF	Serbia	Miljan Stojanović (to Moravac Mrštane, was on loan at Pusta Reka)
5	DF	Serbia	Miljan Stajić (to Vranjska Banja)
4	MF	Serbia	Marko Mitić (on loan to Vranjska Banja)
18	MF	Serbia	Dušan Mladenović (to Jedinstvo Paraćin)
—	MF	Serbia	Petar Veličković (to Karađorđe Topola, was on loan at Vlasina)
12	MF	Serbia	Marko Nestorović (to Avala Beli Potok)
—	DF	Serbia	Nemanja Gorčić (on loan to Moravac Mrštane, previously brought from the same club)
—	FW	Serbia	Miodrag Todorović (to Radnički NP, previously brought from the same club)
—	DF	Serbia	Vladimir Stojanović (to Car Konstantin)
14	DF	Montenegro	Lazar Đokić (to Čukarički)
26	MF	Serbia	Zoran Šćepanović (on loan to Moravac Mrštane)
—	FW	Serbia	Momčilo Mladenović (on loan to Moravac Mrštane, previously brought from OFK Beograd)
7	MF	Serbia	Nikola Stefanović (to (Germany) Türkiye Wilhelmsburg)

=== Sinđelić Beograd ===
In: Note: Flags indicate national team as defined under FIFA eligibility rules; some limited exceptions apply. Players may hold more than one non-FIFA nationality.

No.	Pos.	Nation	Player
—	MF	Serbia	Nemanja Obrenović (from Kolubara)
—	DF	Serbia	Filip Pavišić (free, last with Beograd 1929)
—	MF	Serbia	Dušan Petronijević (from BSK Borča)
—	DF	Serbia	Radomir Nešić (from GSP Polet)
—	DF	Serbia	Ivan Kričak (was on loan, now signed from Rad)
—	GK	Serbia	Đorđe Vukašinović (from Radnički Obrenovac)
—	MF	Serbia	Stefan Šapić (loan extension from Čukarički)
—	DF	Serbia	Miloš Stojanović (on loan from Red Star Belgrade)
—	MF	Serbia	Strahinja Pavišić (from GSP Polet)
—	MF	Bosnia and Herzegovina	Esmir Ahmetović (free, last with (Bosnia and Herzegovina) Bratstvo Gračanica)
—	MF	Bosnia and Herzegovina	Nemanja Lekanić (from Mačva Šabac)

Out: Note: Flags indicate national team as defined under FIFA eligibility rules; some limited exceptions apply. Players may hold more than one non-FIFA nationality.

No.	Pos.	Nation	Player
—	FW	Serbia	Marko Golubović (loan return to Partizan)
—	FW	Serbia	Milorad Dabić (loan return to Rad)
—	MF	Serbia	Nedeljko Piščević (to Rad)
—	DF	Serbia	Predrag Stanimirović (to Dinamo Pančevo)
—		Serbia	Milan Panić (to Crvena Zvezda MML)
—	DF	Serbia	Filip Davidović (to Hajduk Beograd)
—	MF	Serbia	Nikola Petrović (to IMT)
—	MF	Serbia	Veljko Selaković (to Grafičar Beograd)
—	FW	Serbia	Ognjen Bjeličić (to Inđija)
—	MF	Serbia	Ivan Janković (to BSK Borča)
—	GK	Serbia	Stefan Krstić (to Lokomotiva Beograd)
—	MF	Serbia	Nikola Jovanović (to BASK)

=== Budućnost Dobanovci ===
In: Note: Flags indicate national team as defined under FIFA eligibility rules; some limited exceptions apply. Players may hold more than one non-FIFA nationality.

No.	Pos.	Nation	Player
—	DF	Serbia	Filip Milošević (loan return from Jedinstvo Surčin)
—	DF	Serbia	Miloš Tanović (loan return from Radnički NP)
—	MF	Serbia	Stefan Krkobabić (loan return from Radnički NP)
—	DF	Serbia	Milan Jagodić (from Kolubara)
—	MF	Serbia	David Dujić (from Radnički NP)
—	DF	Serbia	Aleksandar Gangolj (from Radnički Beograd)
—	FW	Serbia	Nebojša Bastajić (from Smederevo)
—	MF	Serbia	Nikola Kokir (from BSK Batajnica)
—	FW	Serbia	Ninoslav Nikolić (from Moravac Mrštane)
—	GK	Serbia	Veljko Bažalac (from Rakovica)
—	DF	Serbia	Nikola Vukajlović (on loan from (Czech Republic) Viktoria Plzeň)
—	MF	Serbia	Nikola Dimitrijević (from Rad)

Out: Note: Flags indicate national team as defined under FIFA eligibility rules; some limited exceptions apply. Players may hold more than one non-FIFA nationality.

No.	Pos.	Nation	Player
11	MF	Serbia	Nemanja Subotić (to Vojvodina)
13	DF	Serbia	Stevan Radulović (to Dinamo Pančevo)
14	FW	Serbia	Lazar Vladisavljević (to Mačva Šabac)
19	FW	Serbia	Vuk Ranđić (to Šumadija Aranđelovac)
—	GK	Serbia	Marko Đorđić (to Studentski Grad)
—	MF	Serbia	Vladimir Petrović (to Šumadinac Bečmen)
—	FW	Serbia	Zoran Komazec (to Proleter Vranovo, previously brought from Žarkovo)
—	DF	Bosnia and Herzegovina	Aleksandar Vasiljević (to Brodarac)
—	DF	Serbia	Jovan Simić (on loan to Proleter Vranovo, previously brought from Dunav Prahovo)

=== Proleter Novi Sad ===
In: Note: Flags indicate national team as defined under FIFA eligibility rules; some limited exceptions apply. Players may hold more than one non-FIFA nationality.

No.	Pos.	Nation	Player
16	MF	Serbia	Stefan Čolović (from Kolubara)
14	DF	Montenegro	Mitar Ćuković (from (Montenegro) Lovćen)
23	DF	Serbia	Predrag Jović (from (Malta) Birkirkara)
27	MF	Serbia	Dušan Plavšić (from Kolubara)
7	FW	Serbia	Vladimir Peralović (from Kolubara)
5	DF	Serbia	Miloš Brajović (from Kolubara)
25	MF	Serbia	Mladen Lukić (from Kolubara)
18	FW	Serbia	Luka Lemić (from Kolubara)
24	FW	Serbia	Zoran Mihailović (from Kolubara)
20	MF	Serbia	Nikola Ilić (from Kolubara)
26	DF	Serbia	Danilo Nikolić (from OFK Beograd)
19	DF	Serbia	Zarija Lambulić (from Brodarac)
3	DF	Serbia	Milivoje Mušikić (from Bačka BP)
32	GK	North Macedonia	Nikola Tošeski (from (North Macedonia) Pobeda Prilep)
8	MF	Serbia	Srđan Šćepanović (loan extension from Vojvodina)
9	FW	Serbia	Milan Mirosavljev (on loan from, previously sold to Vojvodina)
94	GK	Serbia	Dejan Stanivuković (from Bačka BP)
15	FW	Serbia	Saša Ćurko (from Vojvodina)
21	DF	Serbia	Marko Prljević (from (Armenia) Shirak)
12	GK	Serbia	Dejan Bogunović (from Hajduk Čurug)
1	GK	Serbia	Miloš Sekicki (from Indeks Novi Sad)
2	DF	Montenegro	Vasilije Radenović (from (Montenegro) Dečić)

Out: Note: Flags indicate national team as defined under FIFA eligibility rules; some limited exceptions apply. Players may hold more than one non-FIFA nationality.

No.	Pos.	Nation	Player
1	GK	Serbia	Marko Ilić (loan return to Vojvodina)
2	DF	Serbia	Milan Lazarević (loan return to Vojvodina)
6	MF	Serbia	Marko Đurišić (loan return to Vojvodina)
8	MF	Serbia	Dejan Milićević (to TSC)
7	MF	Serbia	Dragan Karanov (to (Germany) FC Frittlingen)
—	DF	Serbia	Miloš Ubović (was on loan, now signed with Srbobran)
—	DF	Serbia	Nikola Kulpinski (to Srbobran)
—	DF	Serbia	Vladimir Radaković (to Srbobran)
16	FW	Serbia	Luka Grgić (to Borac Šajkaš)
—		Serbia	Miloš Vukov (to Borac Šajkaš, was on loan at Titel)
17	FW	Serbia	Miloš Manojlović (on loan to Radnički Šid)
19	DF	Serbia	Branko Žigić (retired, became assistant coach)
—	DF	Serbia	Dejan Peković (on loan to Cement Beočin, previously brought from Crvena Zvezda NS)
20	MF	Montenegro	Nemanja Bošković (to Radnički Sombor)
—	FW	Serbia	David Stojisavljević (to Cement Beočin, was on loan at Sloga Temerin)
5	MF	Serbia	Stefan Petrović (to ČSK Čelarevo)
12	GK	Serbia	Stefan Šurlan (on loan to Mladost Bački Petrovac)
—		Serbia	Srđan Ostojić (to Srbobran)
—	FW	Serbia	Dino Kasumović (to Kabel, previously brought from BSK Batajnica)
—	MF	Serbia	Nemanja Kisić (to Indeks Novi Sad)
13	FW	North Macedonia	Strahinja Krstevski (on loan to Borac Šajkaš)
—	FW	Serbia	Luka Bošković (on loan to Brodarac)
—	FW	Serbia	Luka Kosmajac (was on loan, now signed for Srbobran)
3	MF	Serbia	Vladimir Ilić (loan extension to Cement Beočin)
11	DF	Serbia	Nemanja Stojšić (on loan to Borac Novi Sad)
14	MF	Serbia	Zoran Karać (to ČSK Čelarevo)
32	GK	Serbia	Vladan Elesin (to ČSK Čelarevo)
6	MF	China	Zhong Haoran (to Borac Čačak)
—	DF	Serbia	Dejan Zeljković (on loan to Mladost Bački Petrovac, was on loan at Veternik)
—	DF	Serbia	Srđan Vukaljević (released, was on loan at Sloga Temerin)
18	MF	Serbia	Pavle Šljivančanin (released)
15	DF	Serbia	Bojan Šalipur (released)

=== ČSK Čelarevo ===
In: Note: Flags indicate national team as defined under FIFA eligibility rules; some limited exceptions apply. Players may hold more than one non-FIFA nationality.

No.	Pos.	Nation	Player
—	MF	Serbia	Stefan Petrović (from Proleter Novi Sad)
—	DF	Serbia	Nemanja Anđelković (from Radnik Surdulica)
—	DF	Serbia	Miloš Vilotijević (from Srbobran)
—	DF	Serbia	Igor Stepančev (from Radnički Zrenjanin)
—	FW	Serbia	Georgije Ilić (was on loan, now signed from Rad)
—	MF	Bosnia and Herzegovina	Darko Jović (on loan from Vojvodina)
—	DF	Cameroon	Ibrahim Walidjo (from (Greece) Ialysos)
—	FW	Serbia	Goran Potkozarac (from OFK Odžaci)
—	FW	Serbia	Nikola Popović (from BSK Borča)
—	FW	Serbia	Kosta Bajić (from (Kazakhstan) Kyzylzhar)
—	DF	Serbia	Srđan Drašković (from (Malta) Victoria Wanderers)
—	DF	Bosnia and Herzegovina	Dajan Ponjević (from OFK Odžaci)
—	FW	South Korea	Cho Min-se (from (Germany) Oberkasseler FV 1910 e.V.)
—	GK	Serbia	Vladan Elesin (from Proleter Novi Sad)
—	MF	Serbia	Zoran Karać (from Proleter Novi Sad)
—	FW	Russia	Aleksei Zolotarenko (free, last with (Belarus) Vitebsk)
—	DF	Serbia	Josip Hadrava (from Krila Krajine)
—		Serbia	Luka Latković (from Kikinda)
—		Serbia	Nikola Živanov (from Budućnost Gložan)
—	FW	Nigeria	Kelvin Obasi (from (Nigeria) Alpha FC)
—	DF	Guatemala	Adolfo Alvarez (free)

Out: Note: Flags indicate national team as defined under FIFA eligibility rules; some limited exceptions apply. Players may hold more than one non-FIFA nationality.

No.	Pos.	Nation	Player
—	DF	Montenegro	Stefan Zogović (loan return to Vojvodina)
—	DF	Serbia	Dejan Kerkez (loan return to Spartak Subotica)
—	FW	Serbia	Luka Rudan (to IMT)
—	DF	Serbia	Nebojša Mezei (to TSC)
—	DF	Serbia	Srđan Bečelić (to TSC)
—	MF	Serbia	Aleksandar Davidov (to TSC)
—	MF	Serbia	Bojan Jelić (released)
—	MF	Bosnia and Herzegovina	Miloš Đurđić (to (Bosnia and Herzegovina) Travnik)
—	GK	Serbia	Damjan Knežević (to Čukarički)
—	DF	Serbia	Ivan Vasiljević (to (Slovenia) Rudar Velenje)
—	DF	Serbia	Filip Radović (to Temnić, was on loan at Crvena Zvezda NS)
—		Serbia	Strahinja Ilić (was on loan, now signed with Budućnost Gložan)
—		Serbia	Aleksandar Alempić (to Budućnost Gložan)
—	FW	Zimbabwe	Tendai Chitiza (to TSC)
—	DF	Serbia	Miloš Zečević (to Borac Aleksandrovo)
—		Serbia	Jovan Dokić (was on loan, now signed with Budućnost Gložan)
—	DF	Serbia	Milan Medić (to Budućnost Gložan)
—	MF	Serbia	Petar Tanasić (to Cement Beočin)
—	FW	Serbia	Bogdan Tepić (to Cement Beočin)
—	MF	Serbia	Aleksandar Desančić (to Bežanija)
—	MF	Serbia	Marko Tadić (to (Bosnia and Herzegovina) Modriča Alfa)
—	DF	Serbia	Branislav Tucakov (loan extension to Sloga Temerin)
—	DF	Serbia	Aleksandar Jovanić (to Budućnost Mladenovo)
—	MF	Serbia	Aleksandar Stanić (to OFK Odžaci)
—	MF	Serbia	Ognjen Dučić (on loan to Radnički Zrenjanin, was on loan at Borac Sakule)
—	MF	Serbia	Dejan Mitrović (to Kabel, was on loan at Cement Beočin)
—	MF	Serbia	Marko Ris (to Jugović Kać, was on loan at Crvena Zvezda NS)
—		Serbia	Srđan Mirković (loan extension to Mladost Kruščić)
—	DF	Serbia	Damjan Todorović (on loan to Crvena Zvezda NS, previously brought from Inđija)
—		Serbia	Marko Borojević (to Bačka BP)
—	MF	Bosnia and Herzegovina	Zoran Vuković (to Sutjeska Bačko Dobro Polje)
—	GK	Serbia	Vuk Vlajić (to KMF Kruna)

=== Teleoptik ===
In: Note: Flags indicate national team as defined under FIFA eligibility rules; some limited exceptions apply. Players may hold more than one non-FIFA nationality.

No.	Pos.	Nation	Player
—	MF	Serbia	Marko Šiškov (from OFK Beograd)
—	FW	Serbia	Aleksandar Katanić (from Dunav Stari Banovci)
—	FW	Serbia	Stefan Serdar (from IMT)
—	MF	Serbia	Luka Čermelj (from IMT)
—	DF	Bosnia and Herzegovina	Marko Čubrilo (loan extension from Partizan)
—	FW	Serbia	Stefan Đurić (loan extension from Partizan)
—	DF	Serbia	Luka Cucin (loan extension from Partizan)
—	MF	Serbia	Lazar Vujanić (on loan from Partizan)
—	MF	Serbia	Filip Čermelj (loan extension from Partizan)
—	MF	Serbia	Jovan Nišić (loan extension from Partizan)
—	MF	Serbia	Filip Jović (loan extension from Partizan)
—	FW	Serbia	Stefan Ilić (loan extension from Partizan)
—	FW	Serbia	Strahinja Jovanović (loan extension from Partizan)
—	MF	Serbia	Veljko Birmančević (loan extension from Partizan)
—	DF	Serbia	Jovan Krstić (loan extension from Partizan)
—	DF	Montenegro	Peđa Savić (loan extension from Partizan)
—	GK	Serbia	Jovan Trnić (loan extension from Partizan)
—	MF	Russia	Maksim Lada (from (Russia) Zenit)
—	MF	Serbia	Filip Minić (was on loan, now signed from Partizan)
—	GK	Serbia	Aleksandar Popović (on loan from Partizan)
—	FW	Serbia	Nikola Lakčević (on loan from Partizan)
—	DF	Serbia	Adnan Islamović (loan extension from Partizan)
—	FW	Serbia	Vladimir Đilas (on loan from Partizan)
—	GK	Serbia	Nemanja Stevanović (on loan from Partizan)

Out: Note: Flags indicate national team as defined under FIFA eligibility rules; some limited exceptions apply. Players may hold more than one non-FIFA nationality.

No.	Pos.	Nation	Player
—	GK	Serbia	Đorđe Lazović (loan return to Partizan)
—	DF	Serbia	Strahinja Bošnjak (loan return to Partizan)
—	FW	Serbia	Sava Petrov (loan return to Partizan)
—	FW	Serbia	Đorđe Jovanović (loan return to Partizan)
—	MF	Serbia	Tomislav Todorović (loan return to Partizan)
—	DF	Serbia	Uroš Zlatović (loan return to Partizan)
—	DF	Serbia	Bojan Mlađović (to Bačka BP)
—	GK	Serbia	Ivan Nemet (to Tvrđava Bač)
—	MF	Serbia	Vasilije Janjić (to OFK Beograd)

=== Temnić ===
In: Note: Flags indicate national team as defined under FIFA eligibility rules; some limited exceptions apply. Players may hold more than one non-FIFA nationality.

No.	Pos.	Nation	Player
—	DF	Serbia	Miloš Mijokov (from BASK)
—	GK	Serbia	Aleksa Dodić (free, last with Jagodina)
—	MF	Serbia	Predrag Luka (from Mladost Lučani)
—	GK	Serbia	Petar Jokić (from Jedinstvo Paraćin)
—	DF	Serbia	Borko Milenković (from Jedinstvo Paraćin)
—	FW	Serbia	Matija Pavlović (from Jedinstvo Paraćin)
—	MF	Serbia	Zoran Marušić (from BSK Borča)
—	FW	Serbia	Andrija Majdevac (on loan from Napredak Kruševac)
—	MF	Serbia	Marko Stanojević (loan extension from Napredak Kruševac)
—	DF	Serbia	Stefan Todorović (from Trayal)
—	FW	Serbia	Dušan Ristić (from Budućnost Krušik)
—	FW	North Macedonia	Stevica Ristić (free, last with (South Korea) Jeonnam Dragons)
—	GK	Serbia	Lazar Azdejković (from Trstenik PPT)
—	FW	China	Zhang Wu (from (China) Tianjin Teda)

Out: Note: Flags indicate national team as defined under FIFA eligibility rules; some limited exceptions apply. Players may hold more than one non-FIFA nationality.

No.	Pos.	Nation	Player
—	MF	Serbia	Milan Stojanović (loan return to Radnik Surdulica)
—	DF	Serbia	Dušan Mijailović (to Ozren)
—	GK	Serbia	Slobodan Marković (to Jedinstvo Paraćin)
—	MF	Serbia	Ivan Stojanović (to Varvarin)
—		Serbia	Jovan Milutinović (to Varvarin)
—	DF	Serbia	Dušan Ćosić (to Juhor Obrež)
—	FW	Serbia	Dušan Manojlović (to Morava Ćuprija)
—	DF	Serbia	Dalibor Simonović (to Sloga Ćićevac)
—	MF	Serbia	Nemanja Boškovac (on loan to Bukovik Ražanj)
—	MF	Serbia	Jovan Jovanović (on loan to Bošnjane)
—	FW	Serbia	Ilija Stojanović (on loan to Jedinstvo Paraćin, previously brought from Tabane)
—	MF	China	Wang Lei (to Mladost Lučani)
—	DF	Serbia	Filip Radović (on loan to Trstenik PPT, previously brought from ČSK Čelarevo)

=== Radnički Kragujevac ===
In: Note: Flags indicate national team as defined under FIFA eligibility rules; some limited exceptions apply. Players may hold more than one non-FIFA nationality.

No.	Pos.	Nation	Player
—	FW	Serbia	Stefan Nikolić (loan return from Sušica)
—	DF	Serbia	Aleksandar Dragačević (from Karađorđe Topola)
—	DF	Serbia	Igor Vićentijević (from Smederevo)
—	FW	Serbia	Nenad Đurđević (from Šumadija 1903)
—	MF	Serbia	Stefan Nedović (from Šumadija 1903)
—	MF	Serbia	Nemanja Danilović (from Sloga Kraljevo, to youth team)
—	GK	Serbia	Spasoje Stefanović (free, last with BASK)
—	FW	Ivory Coast	Herve Bostan Amani (on loan from Javor Ivanjica)
—	MF	Serbia	Nikola Unković (from Jagodina, to youth team)

Out: Note: Flags indicate national team as defined under FIFA eligibility rules; some limited exceptions apply. Players may hold more than one non-FIFA nationality.

No.	Pos.	Nation	Player
8	MF	Serbia	Marko Krasić (to Hong Kong Rangers)
—	FW	Serbia	David Veselinović (to Napredak Markovac)
—	MF	Serbia	Nikola Arsenijević (was on loan, now signed with Gruža)
28	MF	Serbia	Marko Milovanović (loan extension to Gruža)
—	GK	Serbia	Marko Živak (on loan to Gruža)
—	DF	Serbia	Nikola Ilić (on loan to Šumadija Aranđelovac)
25	DF	Serbia	Goran Milojević (on loan to Sušica, was on loan at Šumadija 1903)
—	MF	Serbia	Miloš Erić (on loan to Sušica)
—	DF	Serbia	Lazar Vasojević (loan extension to Sušica)
4	MF	Serbia	Filip Aleksić (on loan to Šumadija 1903)
—		Serbia	Nemanja Jotović (on loan to Šumadija 1903)
—		Serbia	Lazar Božović (on loan to Šumadija 1903)
—		Serbia	Vuk Jašović (on loan to Šumadija 1903)
—	DF	Serbia	Miloš Lazarević (on loan to Sušica, was on loan at Arsenal Kragujevac)
—	MF	Serbia	Vuk Obradović (loan extension to Arsenal Kragujevac)
97	GK	Serbia	Jovan Najdanović (on loan to Zlatibor)
24	DF	Serbia	Bojan Andrić (on loan to Šumadija 1903)
84	MF	Serbia	Vasilije Veljko Milovanović (on loan to Smederevo)
—		Serbia	Miloš Mijailović (on loan to Arsenal Kragujevac)
—		Serbia	Dušan Vučićević (on loan to Šumadija 1903)
—		Serbia	Luka Marković (on loan to Šumadija 1903)
—		Serbia	Matija Stojanović (on loan to Šumadija 1903)
—		Serbia	Miloš Desivojević (on loan to Marjan Knić)

=== TSC ===
In: Note: Flags indicate national team as defined under FIFA eligibility rules; some limited exceptions apply. Players may hold more than one non-FIFA nationality.

No.	Pos.	Nation	Player
3	DF	Serbia	Nebojša Mezei (from ČSK Čelarevo)
18	DF	Serbia	Srđan Bečelić (from ČSK Čelarevo)
10	MF	Serbia	Aleksandar Davidov (from ČSK Čelarevo)
6	MF	Serbia	Saša Tomanović (from Javor Ivanjica)
14	DF	Serbia	Slobodan Lalić (from Inđija)
21	FW	Serbia	Ognjen Damnjanović (from Mačva Šabac)
4	DF	Serbia	Nebojša Skopljak (from (Cyprus) AEZ Zakakiou)
8	MF	Serbia	Dejan Milićević (from Proleter Novi Sad)
17	MF	Serbia	Lazar Čordašić (from Radnički Pirot)
7	MF	Serbia	Nemanja Grujić (from Zemun)
2	DF	Serbia	Dragan Svitić (from OFK Odžaci)
15	FW	Zimbabwe	Tendai Chitiza (from ČSK Čelarevo)
—			Kristian Pinter (from (Hungary) Hódmezővásárhelyi, to youth team)
20	DF	Serbia	Dušan Mijić (from Bačka BP)
—		Serbia	Lazar Vajagić (from Vrbas, to youth team)
—		Serbia	Luka Jakić (from Vrbas, to youth team)
—		Serbia	Luka Mihailović (from Vrbas, to youth team)

Out: Note: Flags indicate national team as defined under FIFA eligibility rules; some limited exceptions apply. Players may hold more than one non-FIFA nationality.

No.	Pos.	Nation	Player
13	MF	Serbia	Danijel Zlatković (loan return to Spartak Subotica)
3	FW	Serbia	Milan Đokić (loan return to Spartak Subotica)
2	MF	Montenegro	Igor Radović (released)
5	DF	Serbia	Marjan Cvetković (to Bečej)
4	DF	Serbia	Nenad Todorović (to Tisa Adorjan)
—		Serbia	Marko Jerković (to Bajša)
22	DF	Serbia	Nemanja Tresiglavić (was on loan, now signed with Bajša)
—	MF	Serbia	Danilo Žmukić (was on loan, now signed with Bajša)
8	FW	Serbia	Milan Perić (to Sloboda Užice)
17	DF	Serbia	Nikola Marjanović (to Bajša)
20	DF	Serbia	Nedo Nedić (to Preporod)
19	FW	Serbia	Luka Jovanić (to Dinamo Pančevo)
—	DF	Serbia	Srđan Bortnik (to OFK Odžaci)

== See also ==
- Serbian SuperLiga
- 2017–18 Serbian SuperLiga
- Serbian First League
- 2017–18 Serbian First League
