= Tinotenda Chibharo =

Zimbabwean footballer (born 1992)

Personal information
- Full name: Tinotenda Chibharo
- Date of birth: 11 November 1992 (age 34)
- Place of birth: Harare, Zimbabwe
- Position: Striker

Youth career
- 2010–2012: Winthrop University

Senior career*
Years	Team	Apps	(Gls)
2015–2016	Liversedge		
2017–2018	Sloboda Užice	7	(0)
- * Club domestic league appearances and goals as of 19 July 2018

Tinotenda Chibharo (born 11 November 1992) is a Zimbabwean professional footballer who plays as an attacking midfielder or striker.

== Career ==
Born in Zimbabwean capital Harare he was the youngest in a family of 11 which, he started playing soccer at the age of 7. He was studying at Prince Edward School where he was scouted from Winthrop University in United States where he continued his studies. Chibharo then went on to play with English side Liversedge of Cleckheaton.

In summer 2017, Chibharo, moved to Serbian football together with Tendai Chitiza in a move facilitated by former Zimbabwe and Chapungu midfielder Kennedy Chihuri and his partner Trevor Mazhande. He made 7 appearances for FK Sloboda Užice in the 2017–18 Serbian First League this way further widening the selection base for the Warriors. Sloboda spotted him at the 2017 edition of the African Nations Cup UK which Chibharo was star at.
