= Bojan Spasojević (footballer, born 1992) =

Serbian footballer

Personal information
- Full name: Bojan Spasojević
- Date of birth: 18 January 1992 (age 34)
- Place of birth: Kosovska Mitrovica, SFR Yugoslavia
- Height: 1.87 m (6 ft 2 in)
- Position: Striker

Youth career
- ŠF Fitness
- Erdoglija
- Šumadija Kragujevac
- 2010–2011: Javor Ivanjica

Senior career*
| Years | Team | Apps | (Gls) |
| 2008–2009 | Šumadija Kragujevac | | |
| 2010–2014 | Javor Ivanjica | 1 | (0) |
| 2011–2012 | → Sloga Petrovac (loan) | 19 | (3) |
| 2013 | → Šumadija Kragujevac (loan) | | |
| 2013 | → Kopaonik Brus (loan) | 14 | (2) |
| 2014 | → Tabane Trgovački (loan) | 11 | (2) |
| 2015 | Pobeda Beloševac | 8 | (1) |
| 2015–2016 | Arsenal Kragujevac | | |
| 2016 | Vodojaža | | |
| 2017-2021 | Dinamo Vranje | | |
| 2021 | Gruža | | |
| 2022 | Resnik | | |
- * Club domestic league appearances and goals as of 12 May 2017

Bojan Spasojević (Serbian Cyrillic: Бојан Спасојевић; born 18 January 1992) is a Serbian football forward.

== Club career ==
Born in Kosovska Mitrovica, Spasojević moved in Kragujevac as a kid and started playing football with football school "Fitness" at the age of 7. Later he played with local Erdoglija and Šumadija through his youth categories. After the fusion of two clubs, Spasojević made his senior debut for Šumadija 1903 at the age of 16. As a teenager, he signed a five-year contract with Javor Ivanjica, where he also spent a period with youth team. During the time he was under contract with Javor, Spasojević mostly spent as a loaned player with Sloga Petrovac na Mlavi, Šumadija Kragujevac, Kopaonik Brus and Tabane Trgovački. In the meantime, he made his Serbian SuperLiga debut in the 13th fixture match of the 2012–13 season, against Novi Pazar, played on 17 November 2012. After the end of contract, he played with Pobeda Beloševac, Arsenal Kragujevac and Vodojaža, where he was the best scorer with 17 goals in the first-half of the 2016–17 season. At the beginning of 2017, he joined Serbian First League side Dinamo Vranje. Spasojević left Dinamo after the end of a season, making single appearance in the First League.
