= Filip Bajić =

Serbian footballer

Personal information
- Date of birth: 18 November 1993 (age 32)
- Place of birth: Novi Sad, SFR Yugoslavia
- Height: 1.70 m (5 ft 7 in)
- Position: Winger

Team information
- Current team: OFK Bačka

Senior career*
Years	Team	Apps	(Gls)
2010–2013	Novi Sad	77	(3)
2013	Inđija	6	(0)
2014	Novi Sad	14	(4)
2014–2017	OFK Bačka	83	(11)
2017	Napredak Kruševac	7	(0)
2018	OFK Bačka	23	(4)
2019	Bečej	15	(3)
2019–2020	Dinamo Vranje	27	(2)
2020–2021	Borac Čačak	28	(4)
2021–2022	Tekstilac		
2023-	OFK Bačka		
- * Club domestic league appearances and goals as of 7 July 2021

Filip Bajić (Serbian Cyrillic: Филип Бајић; born 18 November 1993) is a Serbian professional footballer who plays as a forward.

== Career ==
=== Dinami Vranje ===
Bajić joined FK Dinamo Vranje in the summer 2019. In January 2020 it was confirmed, that Bajić had left the club.
