= Deni Pavlović =

Serbian footballer

Personal information
- Full name: Deni Pavlović
- Date of birth: 1 September 1993 (age 33)
- Place of birth: Belgrade, FR Yugoslavia
- Height: 1.85 m (6 ft 1 in)
- Position: Centre-back

Team information
- Current team: KÍ
- Number: 5

Youth career
- 2008–2011: Red Star Belgrade
- 2011–2012: Nacional

Senior career*
Years	Team	Apps	(Gls)
2012–2014	Čukarički	36	(1)
2015–2016	Voždovac	19	(0)
2016	Zeta	2	(0)
2017	Novi Pazar	5	(1)
2018–	KÍ	173	(20)
- * Club domestic league appearances and goals as of 1 November 2026

Deni Pavlović (Serbian Cyrillic: Дени Павловић; born 1 September 1993) is a Serbian footballer who plays for KÍ as a defender.
