= Miloš Đurđić =

Bosnian footballer (born 1994)

Personal information
- Date of birth: 30 April 1994 (age 32)
- Place of birth: Banja Luka, Bosnia and Herzegovina
- Position: Centre-back

Youth career
- Borac Banja Luka

Senior career*
Years	Team	Apps	(Gls)
2013–2014	Naprijed		
2014–2016	Sloga Srbac		
2017	ČSK Čelarevo	1	(0)
2017	Travnik	9	(0)
- * Club domestic league appearances and goals as of 11 November 2017

Miloš Đurđić (Serbian Cyrillic: Милош Ђурђић; born 30 April 1994) is a Bosnian-Herzegovinian footballer who most recently played as a centre-back for NK Travnik.

== Club career ==
Đurđić started training football in Borac Banja Luka academy where he passed throw the whole youth categories. He stayed with the club until summer 2013 when he overgrown youth selection and permanently moved to local football club Naprijed. After a season he spent with the club, Đurđić joined Sloga Srbac in 2014. During the first season with Sloga Srbac, Đurđić scored 2 goals in the Regional League West, including one in an 8–1 victory against Gomionica. Making promotion in the Second League of the Republika Srpska, Đurđić continued playing with the club in the 2015–16 season. He had been penalized with a red card in a match against Laktaši. Đurđić was also a scorer of two goals in a match against Liješće. In the first half of the 2016–17 season, Đurđić made 10 appearances with 1 goal for the club. At the beginning of 2017 he signed with ČSK Čelarevo, where he made a debut in the 25 fixture of the 2016–17 Serbian First League season, replacing Bogdan Tepić in second half of the match against Zemun. In summer 2017, Đurđić left the club. Later same year, he joined Travnik. He left the club on 1 January 2018, where his contract expired.

== Honours ==
Sloga Srbac

- Regional League West (Republika Srpska): 2014–15
