= David Samedov =

Russian footballer

Personal information
- Full name: David Fizulievich Samedov
- Date of birth: 24 May 1998 (age 28)
- Place of birth: Belorechensk, Russia
- Height: 1.78 m (5 ft 10 in)
- Position: Right back

Youth career
- 201x–2017: Kuban Krasnodar
- 2017–2018: Bežanija

Senior career*
Years	Team	Apps	(Gls)
2018–2019	Orsha	10	(0)
2020	Lida	2	(0)
2020	Geraklion Moscow (amateur)		
- * Club domestic league appearances and goals

David Fizulievich Samedov (Russian: Давид Физулиевич Самедов; born 24 May 1998) is a Russian former football defender.

== Career ==
Born in Belorechensk, he was playing in the youth team of FC Kuban Krasnodar when, in summer 2017, he moved abroad to Serbia and signed to second-tier club FK Bežanija. He spend one year there but played only for youth team, so in next summer he decided to depart in search for chances to debut in a senior level.

Samedov made his Belarusian First League debut for Orsha in a 0–0 home draw against Baranovichi on 18 May 2019.

On 17 February 2020, Samedov signed contract with Lida.
