= Vladan Elesin =

Serbian footballer

Personal information
- Date of birth: 12 December 1995 (age 30)
- Place of birth: Novi Sad, FR Yugoslavia
- Height: 1.90 m (6 ft 3 in)
- Position: Goalkeeper

Team information
- Current team: Mladost Novi Sad
- Number: 12

Youth career
- Vojvodina

Senior career*
Years	Team	Apps	(Gls)
2013–2014	Novi Sad	0	(0)
2014–2015	Kabel		
2015–2016	Cement Beočin	29	(0)
2016–2017	Proleter Novi Sad	9	(0)
2017–2018	ČSK Čelarevo	12	(0)
2018–2020	Proleter Novi Sad	5	(0)
2020	Trayal	5	(0)
2020	Proleter Novi Sad	2	(0)
2021–2022	Kabel	37	(0)
2022	Loznica	7	(0)
2022–2023	Novi Sad	26	(0)
2023–	Mladost Novi Sad	17	(0)
- * Club domestic league appearances and goals as of 26 December 2023

Vladan Elesin (Serbian Cyrillic: Владан Елесин; born 12 December 1995) is a Serbian footballer who plays for Mladost Novi Sad in the Serbian First League.
