= Dejan Milićević (footballer) =

Serbian footballer (born 1992)

Personal information
- Full name: Dejan Milićević
- Date of birth: 10 March 1992 (age 34)
- Place of birth: Novi Sad, SR Serbia, SFR Yugoslavia
- Height: 1.79 m (5 ft 10 1/2 in)
- Position: Midfielder

Team information
- Current team: Bor

Youth career
- 2007–2010: Vojvodina

Senior career*
Years	Team	Apps	(Gls)
2010–2013	Vojvodina	0	(0)
2011–2013	→ Cement Beočin (loan)	55	(11)
2013–2014	Proleter Novi Sad	22	(0)
2014–2016	SC Röthis	49	(20)
2016–2017	Proleter Novi Sad	27	(2)
2017–2022	TSC	149	(32)
2022	Riteriai	15	(2)
2023–2024	Jedinstvo Ub	37	(4)
2024–2025	Sloga Meridian	8	(0)
2025–2026	Zemun	34	(5)
2026–	Bor	10	(4)
- * Club domestic league appearances and goals as of 23 September 2026

Dejan Milićević (Serbian Cyrillic: Дејан Милићевић; born 10 March 1992) is a Serbian footballer who plays as a midfielder for Serbian First League club Bor.

In the 2022 season he played for Lithuanian club Riteriai in A Lyga.

== Honours ==
TSC

- Serbian First League: 2018–19

Individual

- Serbian SuperLiga Player of the Week: 2020–21 (Round 27)
