= Marko Šiškov =

Serbian footballer

Personal information
- Full name: Marko Šiškov
- Date of birth: 8 January 1998 (age 28)
- Place of birth: Pančevo, FR Yugoslavia
- Height: 1.84 m (6 ft 0 in)
- Position: Centre back

Team information
- Current team: Radnički Obrenovac

Youth career
- Arena Pančevo
- OFK Beograd
- Partizan
- 2014–2016: OFK Beograd

Senior career*
Years	Team	Apps	(Gls)
2016–2017	OFK Beograd	10	(1)
2017–2019	Teleoptik	56	(2)
2019–2020	Žarkovo	7	(0)
2020	Dinamo Pančevo		
2021	Borac Sakule		
2022	Grafičar		
2022–2023	Tekstilac		
2023-	Radnički Obrenovac		

International career
2014–2015	Serbia U17 (Note: Only official UEFA matches included)	5	(0)
- * Club domestic league appearances and goals as of 20:47, 9 October 2019 (UTC)

Marko Šiškov (Serbian Cyrillic: Марко Шишков; born 8 January 1998) is a Serbian professional footballer who plays as a defender for Radnički Obrenovac.

== Club career ==
Šiškov made his senior debuts with OFK Beograd in the 2016–17 Serbian First League, collecting 10 appearances and scoring once. He left the club following their relegation from the second tier and joined newly promoted Teleoptik in July 2017. Throughout the 2017–18 Serbian First League, Šiškov played regularly for the side, making 27 appearances and netting twice in the process.

== International career ==
Šiškov was a member of the Serbia U17s, recording five appearances in the 2015 UEFA European Under-17 Championship qualifiers.

== Statistics ==
As of 21 May 2019

Club	Season	League		Cup		Continental		Total	
Club	Season	Apps	Goals	Apps	Goals	Apps	Goals	Apps	Goals
OFK Beograd	2016–17	10	1	0	0	—		10	1
Teleoptik	2017–18	27	2	—		—		27	2
Teleoptik	2018–19	29	0	1	0	—		30	0
Teleoptik	Total	56	2	1	0	—		57	2
Career total		66	3	1	0	—		67	3
