= Milan Mirić (footballer) =

Bosnian footballer

Personal information
- Full name: Milan Mirić
- Place of birth: Bijeljina, Bosnia and Herzegovina
- Height: 6 ft 2 in (1.88 m)
- Position: Centre back

Team information
- Current team: Loyola Greyhounds
- Number: 15

Youth career
- –2017: Partizan

College career
| Years | Team | Apps | (Gls) |
| 2021 | Dayton Flyers | 11 | (0) |
| 2022– | Loyola Greyhounds | 10 | (0) |

Senior career*
| Years | Team | Apps | (Gls) |
| 2017–2018 | Sloboda Užice | 25 | (1) |
| 2019 | Zlatibor Čajetina | 4 | (0) |
| 2019–2020 | Borac Čačak | | |
| 2022– | Texas United | 5 | (1) |

International career
| 2015–2016 | Bosnia and Herzegovina U17 | 8 | (0) |
- * Club domestic league appearances and goals as of 30 October 2022

Milan Mirić is a Bosnian footballer who plays as a defender for the Loyola University Maryland men's soccer team.

== Club career ==
=== FK Zlatibor Čajetina ===
In mid-January 2019, Mirić joined FK Zlatibor Čajetina.

== Personal life ==
They were born to Velibor and Slavica, has two sisters, Ana and Sonja.
