= Zoran Karać =

Serbian footballer

Personal information
- Full name: Zoran Karać
- Date of birth: 30 June 1995 (age 31)
- Place of birth: Novi Sad, FR Yugoslavia
- Height: 1.80 m (5 ft 11 in)
- Position: Winger

Team information
- Current team: Kabel Novi Sad
- Number: 14

Youth career
- Vojvodina

Senior career*
Years	Team	Apps	(Gls)
2014–2015	Cement Beočin	25	(4)
2015–2016	ČSK Čelarevo	4	(0)
2016	→ Cement Beočin (loan)	12	(4)
2016	Sloga Temerin	8	(0)
2017	Proleter Novi Sad	10	(1)
2017–2018	ČSK Čelarevo	14	(3)
2017–2021	Kabel	85	(22)
2021–2022	Mladost Novi Sad	28	(5)
2023	Zlatibor Čajetina	15	(2)
2023–2025	Sloga Meridian	43	(1)
2025–	Kabel Novi Sad	43	(1)
- * Club domestic league appearances and goals as of 14 May 2026

Zoran Karać (Serbian Cyrillic: Зоран Караћ; born 30 June 1995) is a Serbian professional footballer who plays as a winger for Kabel Novi Sad.

== Honours ==
Kabel

- Serbian League Vojvodina: 2018–19
