= Stefan Marković (footballer) =

Serbian footballer

Personal information
- Full name: Stefan Marković
- Date of birth: 22 July 1993 (age 33)
- Place of birth: Priština, FR Yugoslavia
- Height: 1.88 m (6 ft 2 in)
- Position: Defender

Senior career*
Years	Team	Apps	(Gls)
2011–2014	Radnički Niš	1	(0)
2012–2013	→ Car Konstantin (loan)	41	(2)
2014	→ Moravac Mrštane (loan)	12	(0)
2014–2015	Moravac Mrštane	25	(0)
2015–2017	Radnički Pirot	53	(2)
2017–2018	Novi Pazar	26	(1)
2019–2020	Radnički Pirot	28	(0)
2020–2022	Car Konstantin		
- * Club domestic league appearances and goals as of 7 March 2024

Stefan Marković (Serbian Cyrillic: Стефан Марковић; born 22 July 1993) is a Serbian footballer who plays as a defender.
