= Damjan Knežević =

Serbian footballer

Personal information
- Date of birth: 8 January 2000 (age 26)
- Place of birth: Zemun, FR Yugoslavia
- Height: 1.93 m (6 ft 4 in)
- Position: Goalkeeper

Team information
- Current team: Smederevo
- Number: 1

Youth career
- Partizan
- OFK Beograd
- Red Star Belgrade
- Brodarac

Senior career*
Years	Team	Apps	(Gls)
2017	ČSK Čelarevo	6	(0)
2017–2018	Čukarički	0	(0)
2018–2021	Mladost Lučani	8	(0)
2021	Inđija	0	(0)
2021	→ Železničar Pančevo (loan)	4	(0)
2021-2022	Zvijezda 09		
2022	Jadran Dekani		
2022-2023	BASK		
2024	Harstad	19	(0)
2025	Inđija	8	(0)
2026–	Smederevo	0	(0)
- * Club domestic league appearances and goals as of 14 May 2026

Damjan Knežević (Serbian Cyrillic: Дамјан Кнежевић; born 8 January 2000) is a Serbian football goalkeeper for Smederevo.

== Club career ==
=== ČSK Čelarevo ===
Born in Zemun, Knežević passed throw the youth categories of Partizan, OFK Beograd, Red Star Belgrade and Brodarac. At the beginning of 2017, Knežević moved to Serbian First League side ČSK Čelarevo. After he spent the winter break off-season playing several friendly matches, Knežević signed with the club and became the regular first team member for the second half of the 2016–17 season, being mostly used as a back-up choice. Knežević made his senior debut on 7 April 2017 in the 21 season fixture, replacing Miroslav Tankosić during the match against Dinamo Vranje. Making 6 appearances with the club until the end of a season, Knežević left the club in summer 2017.

== International career ==
Knežević was a part of the first Serbia under-15 national team squad, formed ending of 2014.

== Career statistics ==
As of 1 June 2017

Appearances and goals by club, season and competition
Club	Season	League			Cup		Continental		Other		Total	
Club	Season	Division	Apps	Goals	Apps	Goals	Apps	Goals	Apps	Goals	Apps	Goals
ČSK Čelarevo	2016–17	Serbian First League	6	0	—		—		—		6	0
