= Augustine Nwagwu =

Nigerian footballer

Personal information
- Full name: Augustine Nwagwu Ejike
- Date of birth: 12 December 1996 (age 29)
- Place of birth: Anambra, Nigeria
- Position: Forward

Senior career*
Years	Team	Apps	(Gls)
2008–2009	Hamitköy Ş.H.S.K.		
2010	Olimpia Bălți		
2010	→ Sfîntul Gheorghe (loan)		
2010	Lapta TBSK		
2013–2014	Rhapsody FC		
2015–2016	Orzeł Parzęczew		
2017	Austria Klagenfurt		
2017	Metalac Gornji Milanovac	2	(0)
2018	Ibar Rožaje	0	(0)
2018–2019	Górnik Piaski	26	(2)
2019	Unia Kosztowy	15	(5)
2021	Podlesianka Katowice	15	(4)
- * Club domestic league appearances and goals as of 26 June 2021

Augustine Nwagwu // (born 12 December 1996) is a Nigerian footballer who plays as a forward.

== Club career ==
In the 2015–16 and 2016–17 seasons, he played in Poland for Orzeł Parzęczew. Although, during winter-break of the 2016–17 season, he signed with Austrian club Austria Klagenfurt. In the summer of 2017, he signed with Serbian First League side FK Metalac Gornji Milanovac. During the winter-break of the 2017–18 season, he moved to FK Ibar playing in the Montenegrin Second League.

In the summer of 2018, he returned to Poland and joined lower league side Górnik Piaski.

== Honours ==
Podlesianka Katowice

- Regional league Silesia IV: 2020–21
