= Maksim Milović =

Montenegrin footballer

Personal information
- Full name: Maksim Milović
- Date of birth: 23 April 1999 (age 27)
- Place of birth: Herceg Novi, Yugoslavia
- Position: Goalkeeper

Youth career
- –2016: Crvena Zvezda
- 2016–2017: Brodarac

Senior career*
Years	Team	Apps	(Gls)
2017–2018	Voždovac	0	(0)
2018–2019	San Fernando CD	4	(0)
2019–2023	Mladost Lučani	22	(0)
2024	Arsenal Tivat	0	(0)

International career
2017	Montenegro U19	3	(0)
- * Club domestic league appearances and goals

Maksim Milović (born 23 April 1999) is a Montenegrin professional footballer who plays for Arsenal Tivat. Earlier in career, he played for Voždovac, San Fernando CD and Mladost Lučani. He also collected 2 caps for Montenegro U19.
