= Yuan Xue =

Chinese association football player

Personal information
- Date of birth: 25 January 1991 (age 35)
- Height: 1.86 m (6 ft 1 in)
- Position: Midfielder

Senior career*
Years	Team	Apps	(Gls)
- Shenzhen Fengpeng
2013	Gansu Aoxin		
2013	→ Shenzhen Fengpeng (loan)		
2014	Lijiang Jiayunhao		
2015–2016	Hunan Billows	3	(0)
2017	Radnik Surdulica	0	(0)
2017	Dečić	0	(0)
2017–2018	Jumilla B		
2018	Yunnan Flying Tigers	20	(3)
2019–2020	Shanxi Longjin	6	(0)
- * Club domestic league appearances and goals as of 15 January 2022

Yuan Xue (Chinese: 薛源; born 25 January 1991) is a Chinese footballer who plays as a midfielder.

== Club career ==
Having played in the lower leagues in China, Yuan became the first Chinese player to play in Montenegro, when he signed for FK Dečić in 2017. He went on to play in Spain with the 'B' team of FC Jumilla.

== Career statistics ==
=== Club ===
As of 15 January 2022.

Club	Season	League			Cup		Other		Total	
Club	Season	Division	Apps	Goals	Apps	Goals	Apps	Goals	Apps	Goals
Hunan Billows	2015	China League One	0	0	0	0	0	0	0	0
Hunan Billows	2016	China League One	3	0	1 (Note: Appearances in the Chinese FA Cup)	0	0	0	4	0
Hunan Billows	Total		3	0	1	0	0	0	4	0
Radnik Surdulica	2016–17	Serbian SuperLiga	0	0	0	0	0	0	0	0
Dečić	2017–18	1. CFL	0	0	0	0	0	0	0	0
Hunan Billows	2018	China League Two	20	3	0	0	2 (Note: Appearances in the China League Two playoffs)	0	22	3
Shanxi Longjin	2019	China League Two	6	0	1	0	0	0	7	0
Shanxi Longjin	2020	China League Two	0	0	0	0	0	0	0	0
Shanxi Longjin	Total		6	0	1	0	0	0	7	0
Career total			29	2	2	0	2	0	33	2
