= Nemanja Milovanović =

Serbian footballer

Personal information
- Full name: Nemanja Milovanović
- Date of birth: 16 June 1991 (age 35)
- Place of birth: Kruševac, SFR Yugoslavia
- Height: 1.89 m (6 ft 2 in)
- Position: Midfielder

Youth career
- Partizan

Senior career*
Years	Team	Apps	(Gls)
2009–2010	Napredak Kruševac	12	(0)
2011–2014	Teleoptik	91	(1)
2014–2015	Mosta	18	(1)
2015	Gżira United		
2015	Mladost Lučani	6	(0)
2016	BSK Borča	1	(0)
2016	Gorodeya	21	(1)
2017	Mačva Šabac	8	(0)
2017–2018	Dinamo Vranje	23	(2)
2018–2019	Javor Ivanjica	33	(0)
2019–2020	OFK Bačka	22	(1)
2020	Kolubara	4	(0)
2020–2022	Napredak Kruševac	32	(0)
2023	Meševo		
- * Club domestic league appearances and goals as of 19 May 2022

Nemanja Milovanović (Serbian Cyrillic: Немања Миловановић; born 16 June 1991) is a Serbian football midfielder.

He joined Maltese second-tier side Gżira United in January 2015.
