= Mirko Đermanović =

Serbian footballer

Personal information
- Full name: Mirko Đermanović
- Date of birth: 2 January 1995 (age 31)
- Place of birth: Belgrade, FR Yugoslavia
- Position: Left-back

Team information
- Current team: Budućnost Krušik 2014

Youth career
- BSK Borča

Senior career*
Years	Team	Apps	(Gls)
2013–2014	BSK Borča	0	(0)
2014	Železničar Lajkovac	4	(0)
2015	Budućnost Krušik 2014	24	(2)
2016–2017	Mačva Šabac	24	(0)
2017–2018	Budućnost Krušik 2014	0	(0)
2018–2020	Jagodina Tabane		
2020–2021	Železničar Lajkovac		
2021–2022	Jedinstvo Ub		
2022–	Budućnost Krušik 2014		
- * Club domestic league appearances and goals as of 2 September 2017

Mirko Đermanović (Serbian Cyrillic: Мирко Ђермановић; also transliterated Mirko Djermanović; born 2 January 1995) is a Serbian football defender, who plays for Budućnost Krušik.

== Club career ==
Born in Belgrade, Đermanović came throw the BSK Borča youth academy. He made his first senior appearances with Železničar Lajkovac in the Serbian League West. After he spent the whole 2015 with Budućnost Krušik 2014, Đermanović signed with Mačva Šabac in 2016. Playing with Mačva, Đermanović won the Serbian League West and Serbian First League. In summer 2017, Đermanović returned to Budućnost Krušik 2014.

== Career statistics ==
As of 23 July 2017

Club	Season	League			Cup		Continental		Other		Total	
Club	Season	Division	Apps	Goals	Apps	Goals	Apps	Goals	Apps	Goals	Apps	Goals
BSK Borča	2013–14	Serbian First League	0	0	0	0	—		—		0	0
Železničar Lajkovac	2014–15	Serbian League West	4	0	—		—		—		4	0
Budućnost Krušik 2014	2014–15	Serbian League West	12	1	—		—		—		12	1
Budućnost Krušik 2014	2015–16	Serbian League West	12	1	—		—		—		12	1
Budućnost Krušik 2014	Total		24	2	—		—		—		24	2
Mačva Šabac	2015–16	Serbian League West	14	0	0	0	—		—		14	0
Mačva Šabac	2016–17	Serbian First League	10	0	—		—		—		10	0
Mačva Šabac	Total		24	0	0	0	—		—		24	0
Budućnost Krušik 2014	2017–18	Serbian League West	0	0	—		—		—		0	0
Career total			52	2	0	0	—		—		52	2

== Honours ==
Mačva Šabac

- Serbian League West: 2015–16
- Serbian First League: 2016–17
