= Stefan Mihajlović (footballer, born 1999) =

Serbian footballer

Personal information
- Date of birth: 1 February 1999 (age 27)
- Place of birth: Gnjilane, FR Yugoslavia
- Height: 1.82 m (6 ft 0 in)
- Position: Winger

Team information
- Current team: Radnički Obrenovac
- Number: 14

Youth career
- Red Star Belgrade
- Voždovac

Senior career*
Years	Team	Apps	(Gls)
2018–2019	Mladost Lučani	6	(0)
2019	→ Sloga Požega (loan)		
2019	Zlatibor Čajetina	12	(0)
2019	Žarkovo	4	(0)
2020	Blau-Weiß Linz II	0	(0)
2020–2021	Mačva Šabac	14	(0)
2021	Proleter Novi Sad	9	(0)
2022–2023	Rad	39	(7)
2023–2024	Novi Pazar	0	(0)
2023	→ Sloboda Užice (loan)	7	(0)
2024–2025	Inđija	22	(1)
2025–	Radnički Obrenovac	37	(2)

International career
2014–2015	Serbia U16	6	(1)
- * Club domestic league appearances and goals as of 19:13, 15 February 2026 (UTC)

Stefan Mihajlović (Serbian Cyrillic: Стефан Михајловић born 1 February 1999) is a Serbian footballer who plays as a winger for Radnički Obrenovac.
