= Jovan Milutinović =

Serbian footballer

Personal information
- Full name: Jovan Milutinović
- Date of birth: 14 January 2000 (age 26)
- Place of birth: Serbia
- Height: 1.87 m (6 ft 2 in)
- Position: Forward

Youth career
- 2013–2015: Mauerwerk Sport
- 2015–2016: 1210 Wien
- 2016–2018: Floridsdorfer AC

Senior career*
Years	Team	Apps	(Gls)
2017–2020	Floridsdorfer II	58	(49)
2018–2020	Floridsdorfer AC	4	(0)
2020	→ Donaufeld (loan)	2	(1)
2020–2021	Kolubara	3	(0)
2021	TEK Sloga		
2022	SV Stockerau	21	(5)
2023	SK Wullersdorf	14	(4)
- * Club domestic league appearances and goals as of 19:10, 24 January 2024 (UTC)

Jovan Milutinović (Serbian Cyrillic: Јован Милутиновић; born 14 January 2000) is a Serbian footballer who plays as a forward.

== Club career ==
=== Floridsdorfer ===
After spells at Mauerwerk Sport and 1210 Wien, Milutinović joined Floridsdorfer AC in 2016. In 2017, Milutinović began playing with the reserve team of Floridsdorfer.

He got his professional debut for the club in the 2. Liga against Young Violets on 9 November 2018. He ended the 2018-19 season with four appearances 2. Liga. Beside that, he made 25 games and scored 20 goals for the reserve team, helping them reaching a fifth place in the Austrian 2. Landesliga. On 27 June 2019, Milutinović signed his first professional contract with Floridsdorfer AC.

In January 2020, he was loaned out to Wiener Stadtliga club SR Donaufeld for the rest of the 2019-20 season to gain some experience, as he at the time, only was playing for Floridsdorfer's reserve team. He played a total of three appearances for Donaufeld.

=== Kolubara ===
Milutinović moved to Serbian First League club FK Kolubara in the summer 2020. He made three appearances for the club, before leaving again at the end of the season.

=== Return to Austria ===
After a spell at TEK Sloga in 2021, Milutinović returned to Austria in 2022, where he joined SV Stockerau. In January 2023, Milutinović joined SK Wullersdorf.
