= FK Arsenal 1930 =

Serbian football club

Arsenal 1930
- Full name: Fudbalski Klub Arsenal 1930
- Founded: 1930; 95 years ago 2022; 3 years ago (refounded)
- Ground: Stadion Palilula
- Capacity: 1,000
- President: Milašin Tomović
- League: Kragujevac First League
- 2024–25: Kragujevac Second League, 2nd of 14 (promoted)
Home colours	Away colours

FK Arsenal 1930 (Serbian Cyrillic: ФК Арсенал 1930) is a football club based in Kragujevac, Serbia. They compete in the Kragujevac First League, the 5th tier of the national league system.

== History ==
Founded in 1930, the club won the Serbian League Morava in the 1995–96 season, earning promotion to the Second League of FR Yugoslavia. They placed second from the bottom in Group West in their debut appearance and were instantly relegated from the second tier.

In 2022, the club was refounded as FK Arsenal 1930.

=== Recent league history ===
Season	Division	P	W	D	L	F	A	Pts	Pos
2022–23	Kragujevac Third League	20	11	2	7	56	28	35	5th
2023–24	Kragujevac Second League	26	18	5	3	74	24	59	2nd
2024–25	Kragujevac Second League	22	14	3	5	43	18	45	2nd

== Honours ==
Serbian League Morava (Tier 3)

- 1995–96

Kragujevac First League (Tier 5)

- 2012–13, 2014–15
