= Tendai Chitiza =

Zimbabwean footballer (born 1995)

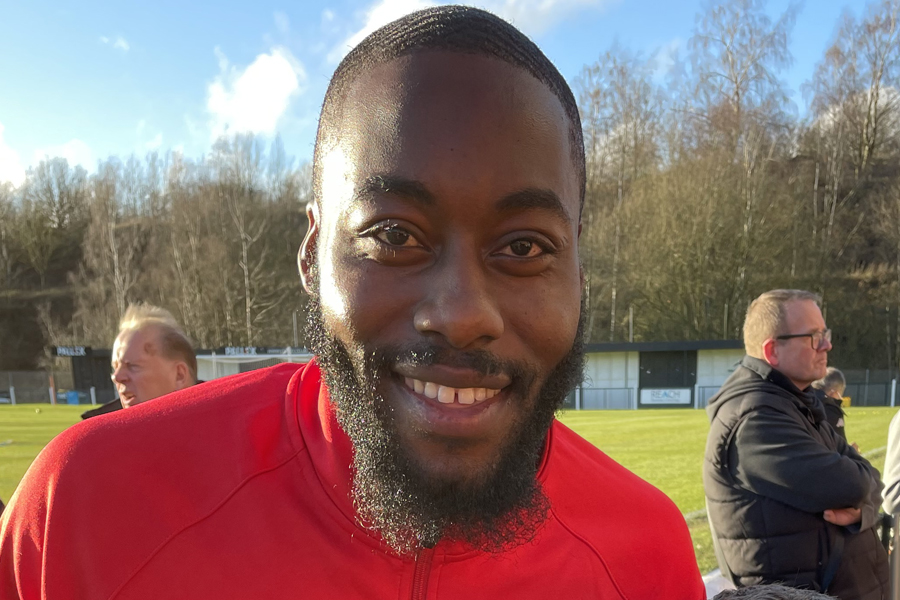
- Chitiza with Coalville Town in January 2023

Personal information
- Full name: Ronald Tendai Chitiza
- Date of birth: 4 July 1995 (age 31)
- Place of birth: Bulawayo, Zimbabwe
- Position: Midfielder

Team information
- Current team: Stamford

Youth career
- Olympia Sport Academy UK

Senior career*
Years	Team	Apps	(Gls)
2012–2014	Gemeg FDC		
2014–2015	Ellistown & Ibstock United		
2015	Aylestone Park		
2015–2016	Leicester Nirvana		
2016	Gresley		
2017	ČSK Čelarevo	14	(2)
2017–2018	TSC	13	(0)
2018–2022	Stamford		
2022–2023	Coalville Town		
2023–	Stamford	0	(0)
- * Club domestic league appearances and goals as of 10:19, 14 August 2023 (UTC)

Ronald Tendai Chitiza (born 4 July 1995) is a Zimbabwean footballer who plays as a midfielder for Southern League Premier Division Central side Stamford.

== Career ==
He was born in Bulawayo, second largest city of Zimbabwe. Playing mostly as centre forward, but also as wide midfielder, he joined Gemeg FDC in August 2012. He made 17 appearances and scored 12 goals until summer 2014 when he left the club.

Chitiza played two seasons with Ellistown & Ibstock United. Afterwards he played with Aylestone Park and Leicester Nirvana. By January 2016 Chitiza was still playing with Leicester Nirvana.

In 2016, he was part of the Team Zimbabwe UK, a team formed by Zimbabwean players living in UK, which participated in The UK 2016 AFCON.

In July 2016 he signed with Gresley F.C.

During the winter-break of the 2016–17 season, he moved to Serbia and signed with FK ČSK Čelarevo. He made his professional debut by playing as starter in the first round after the winter-break, in the round 16 of the 2016–17 Serbian First League, played on March 5, 2017, against FK Inđija, a 0–0 draw.

The following summer he moved to another Serbian club, FK TSC, where he played during the 2017–18 Serbian First League.

On 6 July 2022, Chitiza was announced as a signing for Southern League Premier Division Central side Coalville Town, with manager Adam Stevens saying the move suited all parties as the player had recently moved to live in Coalville.

Tendai made his Southern League Premier Division Central for Coalville Town on 6 August 2022, in an away fixture against Rushall Olympic. Coalville won the match 3–0, with Tendai completing 78 minutes of the match, before being replaced by Luke Shaw.
