= List of Serbian football transfers winter 2018–19 =

- This is a list of transfers in Serbian football for the 2018–19 winter transfer window.
- Moves featuring Serbian SuperLiga and Serbian First League sides are listed.
- The order by which the clubs are listed is equal to the classification at the mid-season of the 2018–19 Serbian SuperLiga and 2018–19 Serbian First League.

== Serbian SuperLiga ==
=== Red Star Belgrade ===
In: Note: Flags indicate national team as defined under FIFA eligibility rules; some limited exceptions apply. Players may hold more than one non-FIFA nationality.

No.	Pos.	Nation	Player
19	DF	SRB	Nemanja Milunović (from (Belarus) BATE Borisov)
7	MF	SRB	Miloš Vulić (from Napredak Kruševac)
36	MF	SVK	Erik Jirka (loan return from (Slovakia) Spartak Trnava)
92	FW	SRB	Aleksa Vukanović (from Napredak Kruševac)
2	DF	SRB	Milan Gajić (from (France) Bordeaux)
8	MF	MNE	Mirko Ivanić (from (Belarus) BATE Borisov)
—	MF	SRB	Martin Novaković (from Partizan, to youth team)

Out: Note: Flags indicate national team as defined under FIFA eligibility rules; some limited exceptions apply. Players may hold more than one non-FIFA nationality.

No.	Pos.	Nation	Player
16	FW	SRB	Nemanja Milić (to (Belarus) BATE Borisov)
7	MF	SRB	Nenad Krstičić (to (Greece) AEK Athens)
5	DF	AUS	Miloš Degenek (to (Saudi Arabia) Al-Hilal)
—	FW	MKD	Strahinja Krstevski (on loan to Grafičar Beograd, previously brought from (Bulgaria) Lokomotiv Sofia)
—	FW	SRB	Dejan Vidić (on loan to Zemun, previously brought from Zlatibor Čajetina)
19	FW	SRB	Nikola Stojiljković (loan return to (Portugal) Braga)
—	MF	BIH	Stefan Kovač (to Čukarički, was on loan at IMT)
—	FW	SRB	Radivoj Bosić (to Partizan, was on loan at Grafičar Beograd)
8	MF	SRB	Dejan Meleg (on loan to (Greece) Levadiakos)
14	FW	SRB	Slavoljub Srnić (to (Spain) Las Palmas)
93	DF	SRB	Aleksa Terzić (on loan to Grafičar Beograd)
44	DF	BRA	Zé Marcos (on loan to (Montenegro) Grbalj, was on loan at Rad)
—	DF	SRB	Ranko Jokić (to Bačka 1901, was on loan at Grafičar Beograd)
—	FW	MNE	Nikola Krstović (on loan to (Montenegro) Zeta, previously brought from the same club)
—	MF	SRB	Stefan Cvetković (on loan to Grafičar Beograd, was on loan at Bačka BP)
95	MF	SRB	Ivan Ilić (loan return to (England) Manchester City)
—	GK	SRB	Mateja Radosavljević (on loan to Internacional, was on loan at IMT)

=== Radnički Niš ===
In: Note: Flags indicate national team as defined under FIFA eligibility rules; some limited exceptions apply. Players may hold more than one non-FIFA nationality.

No.	Pos.	Nation	Player
32	GK	SRB	Milorad Kojić (loan return from Jedinstvo Bošnjace)
55	MF	SWE	Petar Petrović (from (Sweden) Brommapojkarna)
31	FW	SRB	Nikola Čumić (from Metalac G. M.)
2	DF	SRB	Marko Živković (from (Slovakia) DAC Dunajska Streda)
87	MF	MNE	Damir Kojašević (from (Kazakhstan) Shakhter Karagandy)
47	MF	AUT	Aleksandar Kostić (from (Austria) Rapid Wien)

Out: Note: Flags indicate national team as defined under FIFA eligibility rules; some limited exceptions apply. Players may hold more than one non-FIFA nationality.

No.	Pos.	Nation	Player
11	MF	SRB	Aleksandar Stanisavljević (to (Israel) Bnei Sakhnin)
30	FW	SRB	Siniša Babić (to (Bosnia and Herzegovina) Krupa)
1	GK	SRB	Mladen Živković (to Rad)
4	DF	SRB	Andrija Mijailović (to Zemun)
13	DF	SRB	Nikola Aksentijević (to Napredak Kruševac)
98	MF	SRB	Uroš Damnjanović (to Radnik Surdulica)
31	DF	SRB	Dušan Lalatović (to (Bulgaria) Slavia Sofia, was on loan at Dinamo Vranje)
5	DF	SRB	Nikola Stevanović (loan extension to Dinamo Vranje)
99	FW	SWE	Marko Mitrović (on loan to Dinamo Vranje)
—	MF	SRB	Uroš Jemović (on loan to IMT)
—		SRB	Aleksa Ristić (to Bukovik Ražanj)
2	DF	SRB	Filip Stanković (loan extension to Car Konstantin)
—	DF	SRB	Petar Ćirković (loan extension to Radnički Pirot)
9	FW	SRB	Marko Mrkić (released)

=== Partizan ===
In: Note: Flags indicate national team as defined under FIFA eligibility rules; some limited exceptions apply. Players may hold more than one non-FIFA nationality.

No.	Pos.	Nation	Player
41	GK	SRB	Aleksandar Popović (loan return from Teleoptik)
21	MF	NOR	Moussa Njie (from (Norway) Stabæk)
14	FW	SRB	Dejan Georgijević (on loan from (Hungary) Ferencváros)
45	FW	SRB	Radivoj Bosić (from Red Star Belgrade)
—	DF	BIH	Nemanja Vještica (loan return from Teleoptik)

Out: Note: Flags indicate national team as defined under FIFA eligibility rules; some limited exceptions apply. Players may hold more than one non-FIFA nationality.

No.	Pos.	Nation	Player
2	DF	SRB	Luka Cucin (on loan to Spartak Subotica)
5	DF	SRB	Strahinja Bošnjak (to Voždovac, was on loan at Zemun)
61	GK	SRB	Marko Jovičić (on loan to (Malta) Hibernians)
10	MF	MNE	Marko Janković (to (Italy) SPAL)
40	MF	SRB	Jovan Kokir (on loan to Teleoptik)
44	DF	ROU	Gabriel Enache (on loan to (Romania) Dunărea Călărași)
37	FW	SRB	Miloš Kukolj (loan extension to Budućnost Dobanovci)
90	MF	SRB	Strahinja Jovanović (on loan to Teleoptik, was on loan at Proleter Novi Sad)
—	FW	SRB	Nikola Lakčević (loan extension to Teleoptik)
—	FW	SRB	Bogdan Jakšić (to Brodarac)
—	MF	SRB	Martin Novaković (to Red Star Belgrade)
—	DF	SRB	Aleksa Damjanac (on loan to Teleoptik, previously brought from (Belgium) Mouscron)
—	FW	SRB	Matija Babović (on loan to Teleoptik, previously brought from Hajduk Kula)
—	DF	MKD	Marko Simunović (on loan to Teleoptik, previously brought from the same club)
—	GK	SRB	Đorđe Vukanić (on loan to Teleoptik)
—	DF	SRB	Adnan Islamović (on loan to Novi Pazar, was on loan at Žarkovo)
—	MF	BFA	Dramane Salou (released, was on loan at Teleoptik)
27	MF	MNE	Nebojša Kosović (to (Kazakhstan) Kairat)
—	FW	SRB	Luka Cvetićanin (to Voždovac)

=== Čukarički ===
In: Note: Flags indicate national team as defined under FIFA eligibility rules; some limited exceptions apply. Players may hold more than one non-FIFA nationality.

No.	Pos.	Nation	Player
77	MF	BIH	Stefan Kovač (from Red Star Belgrade)
30	MF	SRB	Luka Luković (from (Belgium) Mouscron)

Out: Note: Flags indicate national team as defined under FIFA eligibility rules; some limited exceptions apply. Players may hold more than one non-FIFA nationality.

No.	Pos.	Nation	Player
—	GK	SRB	Aleksandar Knežević (loan return to Apolon Kovači)
—	DF	SRB	Aleksa Denić (loan return to Kiker)
10	MF	SRB	Petar Bojić (to Mladost Lučani)
—	FW	SRB	Luka Ristivojević (to Stepojevac Vaga, was on loan at IMT)
8	MF	MNE	Darko Zorić (to (Kazakhstan) Okzhetpes)
28	MF	BIH	Nenad Kiso (on loan to Zemun)
—	DF	SRB	Mihajlo Kovačević (loan extension to Internacional)
—	DF	SRB	Aleksandar Gusnić (on loan to Internacional)
—	FW	SRB	Predrag Radić (on loan to IMT)
—	MF	SRB	Nenad Ilić (to Bežanija)
27	MF	SRB	Nemanja Belaković (to (Latvia) Spartaks Jūrmala)
32	FW	SRB	Kosta Aleksić (on loan to Bečej)
—	FW	SRB	Vanja Marković (to Grafičar Beograd)

=== Napredak Kruševac ===
In: Note: Flags indicate national team as defined under FIFA eligibility rules; some limited exceptions apply. Players may hold more than one non-FIFA nationality.

No.	Pos.	Nation	Player
13	DF	SRB	Nikola Aksentijević (from Radnički Niš)
23	DF	SRB	Stefan Deák (from (Hungary) Budapest Honvéd)
28	MF	SRB	Ivan Đorić (from Bačka BP)
20	FW	SRB	Miloš Zukanović (from (France) Red Star)
14	MF	SRB	Krsta Bojić (on loan from Bežanija)
17	MF	SRB	Miljan Vukadinović (from Zemun)
2	DF	SRB	Milan Obradović (loan return from GSP Polet Dorćol)

Out: Note: Flags indicate national team as defined under FIFA eligibility rules; some limited exceptions apply. Players may hold more than one non-FIFA nationality.

No.	Pos.	Nation	Player
10	MF	SRB	Miloš Vulić (to Red Star Belgrade)
25	DF	SRB	Nikola Boranijašević (to (Switzerland) Lausanne)
17	FW	SRB	Aleksa Vukanović (to Red Star Belgrade)
4	DF	SRB	Bojan Miladinović (retired)
2	DF	SRB	Miroljub Kostić (to (Uzbekistan) AGMK)
3	DF	SRB	Josip Projić (to (Russia) Fakel Voronezh)
—	GK	SRB	Denis Krasić (to Novi Pazar)
—	FW	SRB	Ivan Bošković (to Crvena Zvezda Novi Sad)
—	GK	SRB	Veljko Marković (to Trayal)
—	MF	GHA	George Ofosu (on loan to (Croatia) Novigrad, previously brought from (Portugal) São Martinho)
—	DF	SRB	Uroš Živanović (released)
4	DF	SRB	Bojan Miladinović (retired)
90	MF	SRB	Đuro Zec (to (Bosnia and Herzegovina) Krupa)

=== Mladost Lučani ===
In: Note: Flags indicate national team as defined under FIFA eligibility rules; some limited exceptions apply. Players may hold more than one non-FIFA nationality.

No.	Pos.	Nation	Player
16	DF	SRB	Nemanja Mićević (loan return from LFK Mladost Lučani)
12	FW	SRB	Đorđe Babić (loan return from LFK Mladost Lučani)
45	FW	SRB	Stefan Tešić (loan return from LFK Mladost Lučani)
—	FW	CMR	Michel Vaillant (loan return from Trayal)
88	FW	SRB	Milan Bojović (from (Kazakhstan) Zhetysu)
10	MF	SRB	Petar Bojić (from Čukarički)

Out: Note: Flags indicate national team as defined under FIFA eligibility rules; some limited exceptions apply. Players may hold more than one non-FIFA nationality.

No.	Pos.	Nation	Player
—	FW	GHA	Bismarck Appiah (to (Ethiopia) Jimma Aba Jifar)
—	FW	SRB	Marko Kilibarda (on loan to Trayal, was on loan at Radnički Beograd)
—	MF	SRB	Veljko Kijevčanin (on loan to Sloga Požega, was on loan at LFK Mladost Lučani)
21	MF	SRB	Despot Obrenović (on loan to Sloga Požega)
—	MF	SRB	Danko Kiković (on loan to Žarkovo, was on loan at Inđija)
40	MF	SRB	Stefan Mihajlović (to Zlatibor Čajetina)
1	GK	SRB	Nemanja Krznarić (retired)

=== Proleter Novi Sad ===
In: Note: Flags indicate national team as defined under FIFA eligibility rules; some limited exceptions apply. Players may hold more than one non-FIFA nationality.

No.	Pos.	Nation	Player
—	DF	SRB	Dejan Zeljković (loan return from ČSK Čelarevo)
—	MF	SRB	Vladimir Ilić (loan return from Kabel)
87	MF	SRB	Miloš Jokić (from Dinamo Vranje)
70	MF	SRB	Predrag Govedarica (from (Kazakhstan) Taraz)
20	MF	GHA	Joseph Bempah (from Sloboda Užice)
13	DF	BRA	Leandro Pinto (from (Greece) Olympiacos Volos)
95	MF	SRB	Nikola Ilić (from Mačva Šabac)

Out: Note: Flags indicate national team as defined under FIFA eligibility rules; some limited exceptions apply. Players may hold more than one non-FIFA nationality.

No.	Pos.	Nation	Player
90	MF	SRB	Strahinja Jovanović (loan return to Partizan)
32	DF	MNE	Vasilije Radenović (to OFK Žarkovo)
25	MF	SRB	Stefan Bukorac (to (Belarus) Torpedo-BelAZ Zhodino)
—	FW	SRB	Zoran Mihailović (to Žarkovo, was on loan at Sloboda Užice)
13	DF	SRB	Nenad Kočović (to Inđija)
—	FW	SRB	Lazar Veselinović (was on loan, now signed for Borac Šajkaš)
84	MF	SRB	Dušan Mićić (retired)
9	FW	SRB	Milan Mirosavljev (to (Kazakhstan) Irtysh Pavlodar)

=== Vojvodina ===
In: Note: Flags indicate national team as defined under FIFA eligibility rules; some limited exceptions apply. Players may hold more than one non-FIFA nationality.

No.	Pos.	Nation	Player
3	DF	SRB	Mladen Devetak (loan return from Kabel)
11	MF	SRB	Kristijan Živković (loan return from Jagodina Tabane)
31	MF	SRB	Vuk Mitošević (from (Hungary) Kisvárda)
99	FW	LBR	Seku Conneh (from (South Korea) Ansan Greeners)
9	FW	SRB	Bojan Matić (from (South Korea) Seoul)

Out: Note: Flags indicate national team as defined under FIFA eligibility rules; some limited exceptions apply. Players may hold more than one non-FIFA nationality.

No.	Pos.	Nation	Player
11	FW	CIV	Ismaël Béko Fofana (to (Azerbaijan) Zira)
14	DF	SRB	Lazar Đorđević (to (Czech Republic) Karviná)
31	FW	SRB	Darko Bjedov (to (Kazakhstan) Atyrau)
—	DF	SRB	Marko Mandić (loan extension to Bečej)
28	MF	SRB	Aleksandar Mirkov (on loan to Bečej)
—	FW	SRB	Miloš Zličić (to Hajduk Kula, was on loan at Cement)
10	MF	SRB	Lazar Arsić (to Voždovac)
20	DF	SRB	Nikola Antić (to (Belarus) Shakhtyor Soligorsk)
—	MF	CRO	Hrvoje Rizvanović (to (Bulgaria) Vereya)
—	MF	SRB	Luka Sinđić (to Zemun)
12	GK	SLO	Filip Starič (to (Spain) San Sebastián de los Reyes B)
19	DF	GRE	Diamantis Chouchoumis (released)
—	MF	BRA	Patrick (to (Croatia) Osijek)

=== Radnik Surdulica ===
In: Note: Flags indicate national team as defined under FIFA eligibility rules; some limited exceptions apply. Players may hold more than one non-FIFA nationality.

No.	Pos.	Nation	Player
4	DF	SRB	Tomislav Pajović (from (Uzbekistan) Navbahor)
20	DF	SRB	Ivan Kričak (from Sinđelić Beograd)
11	FW	SRB	Bogdan Stamenković (from Bratstvo Prigrevica)
24	MF	SRB	Uroš Damnjanović (from Radnički Niš)
19	MF	SRB	Lazar Kojić (on loan from (Netherlands) Fortuna Sittard)
—	MF	SRB	Dušan Trajković (loan return from Pukovac)

Out: Note: Flags indicate national team as defined under FIFA eligibility rules; some limited exceptions apply. Players may hold more than one non-FIFA nationality.

No.	Pos.	Nation	Player
11	FW	SRB	Nikola Radović (to Bačka BP)
20	DF	ALB	Faton Xhemaili (to (Albania) Kukësi)
2	DF	SRB	Siniša Mladenović (to Zemun)
4	DF	SRB	Dragan Žarković (to Bačka BP)
7	DF	BIH	Marko Čubrilo (to (Slovenia) Domžale)
19	MF	SRB	Milan Stojanović (to (Kazakhstan) Okzhetpes)
6	MF	SRB	Dušan Pantelić (to (Greece) PAS Giannina)
—	MF	SRB	Marko Stoiljković (on loan to Car Konstantin, was on loan at Pukovac)
24	MF	GRE	Andreas Dermitzakis (to (Greece) Niki Traganou)

=== Mačva Šabac ===
In: Note: Flags indicate national team as defined under FIFA eligibility rules; some limited exceptions apply. Players may hold more than one non-FIFA nationality.

No.	Pos.	Nation	Player
—	MF	SRB	Dušan Nikolić (loan return from Provo)
45	MF	BIH	Filip Božić (loan return from Sloga Požega)
15	DF	SRB	Marko Mijailović (from Bežanija)

Out: Note: Flags indicate national team as defined under FIFA eligibility rules; some limited exceptions apply. Players may hold more than one non-FIFA nationality.

No.	Pos.	Nation	Player
21	MF	SRB	Nikola Žakula (to Bačka BP)
—	FW	SRB	Lazar Vladisavljević (to (Albania) Apolonia Fier, was on loan at Budućnost Dobanovci)
—	MF	SRB	Matija Miketić (on loan to IMT, was on loan at Sloboda Užice)
—	MF	SRB	Đorđe Belić (on loan to Loznica, was on loan at Drina Ljubovija)
—	DF	SRB	Vladimir Tomić (loan extension to Jedinstvo Ub)
—	DF	SRB	Nikola Popović (on loan to Sloga Erdevik, was on loan at Cement)
95	MF	SRB	Mladen Lukić (to Žarkovo)
23	MF	SRB	Nikola Ilić (to Proleter Novi Sad)
—	DF	SRB	Nenad Rašević (to Zlatibor Čajetina)
—		SRB	Dragan Prodanović (to OFK Šabac, was on loan at Radnički Šabački)

=== Voždovac ===
In: Note: Flags indicate national team as defined under FIFA eligibility rules; some limited exceptions apply. Players may hold more than one non-FIFA nationality.

No.	Pos.	Nation	Player
8	FW	SRB	Predrag Sikimić (from (Kazakhstan) Atyrau)
18	FW	SRB	Filip Stuparević (on loan from (England) Watford, previously sold to the same club)
81	DF	SRB	Dušan Matović (from (Belarus) Minsk)
6	DF	SRB	Strahinja Bošnjak (from Partizan)
42	MF	SRB	Dragoljub Srnić (from (Poland) Śląsk Wrocław)
11	MF	SRB	Lazar Arsić (from Vojvodina)
12	FW	SRB	Nikola Trujić (from (Romania) Botoșani)
—	FW	SRB	Luka Cvetićanin (from Partizan, to youth team)

Out: Note: Flags indicate national team as defined under FIFA eligibility rules; some limited exceptions apply. Players may hold more than one non-FIFA nationality.

No.	Pos.	Nation	Player
23	MF	SRB	Aleksandar Ješić (to Metalac G. M.)
6	MF	BIH	Todor Petrović (to (Ukraine) Vorskla Poltava)
55	DF	BIH	Branko Ostojić (to Radnički Kragujevac)
3	DF	SRB	Nemanja Zlatković (to (Bosnia and Herzegovina) Tuzla City)
11	MF	SRB	Marko Zoćević (to (Uzbekistan) AGMK)
5	DF	SRB	Božidar Veličković (on loan to Inđija)
8	MF	BIH	Zoran Milutinović (to (Bosnia and Herzegovina) Borac Banja Luka)
—	MF	SRB	Vladan Vidaković (to Hajduk Kula, was on loan at Radnički Obrenovac)
—	FW	MNE	Dejan Račić (to (Montenegro) Mornar, was on loan at (Montenegro) Iskra Danilovgrad)
—	DF	SRB	Filip Damjanović (on loan to IMT)
—	MF	SRB	Radovan Avram (on loan to Bežanija, was on loan at GSP Polet Dorćol)
28	MF	SRB	Jovica Blagojević (on loan to Sinđelić Beograd)
—	MF	SRB	Vasilije Janjić (to Zemun, was on loan at Sinđelić Beograd)
14	MF	SRB	Igor Maksimović (on loan to Inđija)
16	FW	SRB	Luka Milunović (to (Malaysia) Melaka United)

=== Spartak Subotica ===
In: Note: Flags indicate national team as defined under FIFA eligibility rules; some limited exceptions apply. Players may hold more than one non-FIFA nationality.

No.	Pos.	Nation	Player
—	MF	SRB	Jovan Lazić (loan return from Bačka 1901)
—	FW	SRB	Stefan Šormaz (loan return from Bačka 1901)
—	DF	SRB	Ensar Brunčević (loan return from Jošanica)
—	GK	SRB	Vojin Stajković (loan return from Hajduk Kula)
—	DF	SRB	Sergej Budimir (loan return from Vinogradar)
—	DF	SRB	Lazar Kaurin (loan return from Vinogradar)
—	MF	SRB	Pavle Stojanović (loan return from Vinogradar)
—	DF	SRB	Nemanja Lazić (loan return from Tisa Adorjan)
13	DF	SRB	Draško Đorđević (from (Saudi Arabia) Al-Mujazzal)
33	MF	SRB	Nemanja Mladenović (from Bačka BP)
14	MF	SRB	Đorđe Radovanović (from Bežanija)
22	DF	SRB	Luka Cucin (on loan from Partizan)
29	MF	SRB	Lazar Tufegdžić (from Sinđelić Beograd)
24	FW	SRB	Nikola Tripković (from Borac Čačak)
32	DF	SRB	Vladimir Otašević (from Borac Čačak)
1	GK	MNE	Mišo Dubljanić (from (Czech Republic) Dynamo České Budějovice)
—	DF	SRB	Igor Tatić (from TSC)

Out: Note: Flags indicate national team as defined under FIFA eligibility rules; some limited exceptions apply. Players may hold more than one non-FIFA nationality.

No.	Pos.	Nation	Player
24	MF	MKD	Benjamin Demir (to (North Macedonia) Makedonija GP)
77	FW	GHA	Samuel Afum (to (Finland) Ilves)
55	DF	UKR	Serhiy Kulynych (released)
—	FW	SRB	Marko Varga (released)
29	FW	SRB	Bojan Čečarić (to (Poland) Cracovia)
40	DF	SRB	Nemanja Ćalasan (to (Portugal) Chaves)
3	MF	JPN	Noboru Shimura (on loan to (Japan) Machida Zelvia)
1	GK	SRB	Nikola Perić (to Dinamo Vranje)
—	MF	SRB	Milivoj Krmar (to Hajduk Kula, was on loan at Bačka 1901)
—	MF	SRB	Predrag Medić (to Zlatibor Čajetina, was on loan at Bačka 1901)
—	MF	SRB	Nemanja Matijević (to Bačka 1901, was on loan at Bačka 1901)
—	DF	MNE	Nikola Popović (released, was on loan at (Montenegro) Mornar Bar)
—	DF	SRB	Filip Milićević (on loan to Zvezdara, previously brought from the same club)
—	FW	SRB	Vido Marković (to Bačka BP)
—	DF	SRB	Branko Milošević (released)
—	DF	SRB	Nikola Cetina (to TSC)
25	GK	SRB	Ivan Dokić (on loan to Bačka 1901)
70	FW	SRB	Luka Bijelović (on loan to Bačka 1901)
26	MF	SRB	Andrija Milić (on loan to Bačka 1901)
2	DF	SRB	Filip Jović (on loan to Bačka 1901)
66	FW	SRB	Uroš Vukićević (to Zlatibor Čajetina)
39	MF	TPE	Tim Chow (to (China) Henan Jianye)
—		SRB	Mateja Nenadović (to Bačka 1901)
—	MF	SRB	Strahinja Lukić (to Bačka 1901)

=== Bačka BP ===
In: Note: Flags indicate national team as defined under FIFA eligibility rules; some limited exceptions apply. Players may hold more than one non-FIFA nationality.

No.	Pos.	Nation	Player
11	FW	SRB	Nikola Radović (from Radnik Surdulica)
6	DF	SRB	Dragan Žarković (from Radnik Surdulica)
24	MF	SRB	Dušan Kuveljić (from Borac Čačak)
15	MF	SRB	Nikola Žakula (from Mačva Šabac)
2	DF	SRB	Nikola Đurić (from Dinamo Vranje)
5	DF	SRB	Darko Gojković (from (Uzbekistan) Kokand 1912)
7	FW	SRB	Miloš Gordić (from Mladi Radnik)
20	FW	SRB	Vido Marković (from Spartak Subotica)
33	GK	SRB	Aleksa Ćirić (from Proleter Mihajlovac)
21	MF	SRB	Branislav Tomić (from Metalac G. M.)
22	MF	SRB	Vojislav Balabanović (from (Montenegro) Kom)
18	FW	BIH	Luka Asentić (from (Bosnia and Herzegovina) Zvijezda 09)

Out: Note: Flags indicate national team as defined under FIFA eligibility rules; some limited exceptions apply. Players may hold more than one non-FIFA nationality.

No.	Pos.	Nation	Player
22	MF	SRB	Stefan Cvetković (loan return to Red Star Belgrade)
11	MF	SRB	Nemanja Mladenović (to Spartak Subotica)
5	DF	SRB	Ivan Šubert (to (Bosnia and Herzegovina) Radnik Bijeljina)
7	FW	SRB	Filip Bajić (to Bečej)
20	MF	SRB	Igor Pantić (released)
24	MF	SRB	Ivan Đorić (to Napredak Kruševac)
—	GK	SRB	Nemanja Jevrić (to Javor Ivanjica)
6	DF	SRB	Miloš Živković (to Bečej)
—	GK	SRB	Kristijan Župić (on loan to (Croatia) NK Osijek II, was on loan at Cement)
21	MF	SRB	Lazar Kojić (loan return to (Netherlands) Fortuna Sittard)
15	FW	SRB	Aleksandar Katanić (to Bežanija)
10	MF	SRB	Veseljko Trivunović (to ČSK Čelarevo)

=== Rad ===
In: Note: Flags indicate national team as defined under FIFA eligibility rules; some limited exceptions apply. Players may hold more than one non-FIFA nationality.

No.	Pos.	Nation	Player
99	FW	SRB	Dejan Parađina (loan return from Bežanija)
21	MF	SRB	Veljko Roganović (loan return from Omladinac Novi Banovci)
25	DF	SRB	Dušan Stević (from (North Macedonia) Rabotnički)
3	DF	MNE	Vladimir Volkov (from (Cyprus) Ermis Aradippou)
20	MF	SRB	Branislav Jovanović (from (Israel) Hapoel Ramat Gan Givatayim)
12	DF	SRB	Đorđe Bašanović (from Zemun)
33	MF	SRB	Milorad Balabanović (from (Bosnia and Herzegovina) Krupa)
14	FW	SRB	Miloš Trifunović (from (Uzbekistan) AGMK)
89	GK	SRB	Mladen Živković (from Radnički Niš)
2	MF	SRB	Goran Smiljanić (from Inđija)

Out: Note: Flags indicate national team as defined under FIFA eligibility rules; some limited exceptions apply. Players may hold more than one non-FIFA nationality.

No.	Pos.	Nation	Player
4	DF	BRA	Zé Marcos (loan return to Red Star Belgrade)
—	FW	SUI	Dejan Subotić (released)
77	MF	SRB	Nenad Marinković (to (Russia) Tyumen)
—	MF	SRB	Nedeljko Piščević (to Javor Ivanjica, was on loan at Sinđelić Beograd)
6	DF	SRB	Zoran Ljubinković (to Kolubara)
—	GK	SRB	Danijel Mićanović (loan extension to Zvezdara)
25	MF	SRB	Branko Riznić (on loan to Zvezdara)
—	MF	SRB	Nikola Vujević (to OFK Vršac)
8	MF	SRB	Marko Stojanović (on loan to OFK Vršac)
—	FW	KOR	Hwang Jong-won (on loan to Žarkovo, was on loan at Radnički Kragujevac)
24	DF	MNE	Stefan Vico (to (Denmark) Næstved)
—	FW	SRB	Marko Jović (on loan to Sinđelić Beograd)
—	MF	SRB	Marko Džodan (on loan to Jedinstvo Surčin, was on loan at Prva Iskra)
—	MF	SRB	Uroš Mutavdžić (to Metalac G. M.)
—	MF	SRB	Stefan Levićanin (on loan to Smederevo 1924)

=== Zemun ===
In: Note: Flags indicate national team as defined under FIFA eligibility rules; some limited exceptions apply. Players may hold more than one non-FIFA nationality.

No.	Pos.	Nation	Player
22	GK	SRB	Miloš Krunić (loan return from Bežanija)
24	FW	SRB	Nikola Savić (loan return from Vranjska Banja)
30	FW	SRB	Dejan Vidić (on loan from Red Star Belgrade)
2	DF	SRB	Siniša Mladenović (from Radnik Surdulica)
4	MF	BIH	Nenad Kiso (on loan from Čukarički)
8	MF	SRB	Luka Sinđić (from Vojvodina)
24	DF	SRB	Milan Savić (from (Latvia) RFS)
33	DF	SRB	Andrija Mijailović (from Radnički Niš)
21	MF	SRB	Ivan Ilić (on loan from (England) Manchester City)
14	FW	NGR	Moses John (from (Portugal) Porto B)
13	DF	SRB	Miloš Zlatković (from (Bosnia and Herzegovina) Zvijezda 09)
23	GK	SRB	Srđan Ostojić (from (Indonesia) Arema)
16	MF	SRB	Vasilije Janjić (from Voždovac)
—	FW	SRB	Andrej Vukas (from BSK Borča)
17	DF	BIH	Borislav Terzić (from (Bosnia and Herzegovina) Sloboda Tuzla)
55	FW	SRB	Vladimir Petrović (from Zlatibor Čajetina)

Out: Note: Flags indicate national team as defined under FIFA eligibility rules; some limited exceptions apply. Players may hold more than one non-FIFA nationality.

No.	Pos.	Nation	Player
16	FW	CAN	Aleksa Marković (released)
11	DF	SRB	Stefan Živković (to (Greece) AEL)
55	DF	SRB	Slavko Lukić (to (Uzbekistan) Navbahor)
21	DF	SRB	Strahinja Bošnjak (loan return to Partizan)
8	MF	SRB	Miljan Vukadinović (to Napredak Kruševac)
95	MF	BIH	Dejan Maksimović (to (Bosnia and Herzegovina) Radnik Bijeljina)
12	DF	SRB	Đorđe Bašanović (to Rad)
—	FW	MNE	Ljubomir Kovačević (to Sloboda Užice)
23	GK	MNE	Nemanja Šćekić (to Žarkovo)
17	MF	SRB	Stevan Luković (to Budućnost Dobanovci)
—		SRB	Jovan Velev (to Stepojevac Vaga)
—		SRB	Nikola Rajković (on loan to Mladenovac)
30	DF	SRB	Branislav Trajković (to (Belarus) Isloch)
33	FW	MKD	Dušan Savić (to (North Macedonia) Belasica)
10	MF	LTU	Daniel Romanovskij (to (Lithuania) Kauno Žalgiris)

=== Dinamo Vranje ===
In: Note: Flags indicate national team as defined under FIFA eligibility rules; some limited exceptions apply. Players may hold more than one non-FIFA nationality.

No.	Pos.	Nation	Player
18	FW	SRB	Vasilije Spasić (loan return from Jedinstvo Bošnjace)
5	DF	SRB	Nikola Stevanović (loan extension from Radnički Niš)
29	FW	SWE	Marko Mitrović (on loan from Radnički Niš)
25	MF	SEN	Seydou Bocar Seck (free, last with (Sweden) Ljungskile)
22	MF	SRB	Miloš Ožegović (from (Iceland) Vikingur)
45	FW	SRB	Nikola Popović (from (Montenegro) Grbalj)
20	FW	GRE	Lefteris Matsoukas (from (Greece) Aittitos Spata)
1	GK	SRB	Nikola Perić (from Spartak Subotica)
28	DF	KOR	Byeon Jae-min (from (Slovenia) Brežice 1919)
31	GK	MKD	Borjan Pančevski (from (North Macedonia) Teteks)
—	GK	MKD	Vasko Vasilev (from (North Macedonia) Vardar, to youth team)
24	MF	SUI	Nemanja Cvijanović (from (Switzerland) Aarau)
4	DF	NGR	Samuel Okon (free, last with (Nigeria) Akwa United)

Out: Note: Flags indicate national team as defined under FIFA eligibility rules; some limited exceptions apply. Players may hold more than one non-FIFA nationality.

No.	Pos.	Nation	Player
45	DF	SRB	Dušan Lalatović (loan return to Radnički Niš)
24	DF	BRA	Taigo (to (Brazil) São Paulo-RS)
25	MF	SRB	Marko Stanojević (to Trayal)
4	DF	SRB	Milan Stanković (to Radan Lebane)
14	DF	SRB	Nikola Đurić (to Bačka BP)
17	DF	SRB	Jovan Zucović (released)
20	MF	SRB	Aleksandar Stojković (to Budućnost Dobanovci)
28	MF	SRB	Miloš Jokić (to Proleter Novi Sad)
31	GK	SRB	Aleksandar Kostić (released)
33	MF	SRB	Pavle Propadalo (released)
—	FW	MNE	Miloš Vukić (to (Montenegro) Rudar Pljevlja)
22	FW	SRB	Marko Radivojević (on loan to Trayal)
—	DF	SRB	Nemanja Gorčić (on loan to Jagodina Tabane, was on loan at Dubočica)
—	FW	SRB	Marko Hristić (loan extension to Vranjska Banja)
—	GK	SRB	Dragan Cakić (was on loan, now signed for Moravac Mrštane)
29	FW	CMR	Ferdinand Fru Fon (released)
1	GK	SRB	Uroš Đurić (to (North Macedonia) Renova)
—	GK	SRB	Aleksandar Jovanović (on loan to Budućnost Popovac, previously brought from Rtanj Boljevac)

== Serbian First League ==
=== Javor Ivanjica ===
In: Note: Flags indicate national team as defined under FIFA eligibility rules; some limited exceptions apply. Players may hold more than one non-FIFA nationality.

No.	Pos.	Nation	Player
6	MF	SRB	Nedeljko Piščević (from Rad)
16	FW	SRB	Marko Bačanin (from (Slovenia) Tabor Sežana)
1	GK	SRB	Nemanja Jevrić (from Bačka BP)
4	DF	SRB	Nemanja Anđelković (from Zlatibor)
34	GK	SRB	Đorđe Lazović (from Kolubara)

Out: Note: Flags indicate national team as defined under FIFA eligibility rules; some limited exceptions apply. Players may hold more than one non-FIFA nationality.

No.	Pos.	Nation	Player
1	GK	SRB	Vladan Đogatović (to (Iceland) Grindavík)
4	DF	SRB	Njegoš Bajović (released)
13	DF	CAN	Derek Cornelius (to (United States) Vancouver Whitecaps)
15	DF	SRB	Nemanja Marković (to Žarkovo)
—	MF	SRB	Ognjen Luković (loan extension to Brodarac)
19	FW	SRB	Filip Obadović (on loan to Grafičar Beograd)

=== Inđija ===
In: Note: Flags indicate national team as defined under FIFA eligibility rules; some limited exceptions apply. Players may hold more than one non-FIFA nationality.

No.	Pos.	Nation	Player
17	MF	SRB	Nebojša Bastajić (from TSC)
2	DF	SRB	Božidar Veličković (on loan from Voždovac)
26	FW	BIH	Aleksa Mrđa (from Lokomotiva Beograd)
9	FW	SRB	Ognjen Damnjanović (from TSC)
—	FW	SRB	David Panjak (from Dunav Stari Banovci)
20	FW	SRB	Aleksa Andrejić (from Trayal)
19	DF	SRB	Nenad Kočović (from Proleter Novi Sad)
3	MF	SRB	Nikola Dimitrijević (from (Slovakia) ViOn Zlaté Moravce)
5	DF	SRB	Alija Izberović (from Tutin)
25	MF	SRB	Nemanja Vidić (from Budućnost Dobanovci)
16	MF	SRB	Igor Maksimović (on loan from Voždovac)
10	MF	SRB	Srđan Dimitrov (from (Thailand) Ubon United)
—	MF	GHA	Justice Neequaye (from (Ghana) Barbarossa)

Out: Note: Flags indicate national team as defined under FIFA eligibility rules; some limited exceptions apply. Players may hold more than one non-FIFA nationality.

No.	Pos.	Nation	Player
16	MF	SRB	Danko Kiković (loan return to Mladost Lučani)
10	FW	SRB	Nikola Mitić (to (Malta) Senglea Athletic)
9	MF	SRB	Nenad Lukić (to TSC)
17	FW	SRB	Dušan Stoiljković (to (Montenegro) Budućnost Podgorica)
20	MF	SRB	Nemanja Mirosavljević (to (Spain) Conquense)
5	DF	SRB	Bojan Ciger (to (Montenegro) Sutjeska Nikšić)
2	MF	SRB	Goran Smiljanić (to Rad)
15	MF	SRB	Dimitrije Zajić (released)
—	FW	SRB	Dušan Isailović (to Hajduk Kula)
19	MF	SRB	Nemanja Stojanović (to Smederevo 1924)
3	DF	SRB	Lazar Vuković (on loan to Borac Sakule)
22	MF	SRB	Milan Janjić (to (Kazakhstan) Caspiy Aktau)
—	FW	SRB	Lazar Milutinović (on loan to Grafičar Beograd, previously brought from Lokomotiva Beograd)

=== TSC ===
In: Note: Flags indicate national team as defined under FIFA eligibility rules; some limited exceptions apply. Players may hold more than one non-FIFA nationality.

No.	Pos.	Nation	Player
22	MF	SRB	Aleksandar Erak (loan return from Bečej)
10	MF	SRB	Ersan Rovčanin (from Metalac G. M.)
27	MF	SRB	Nenad Lukić (from Inđija)
24	DF	SRB	Dejan Stojaković (from Cement Beočin)
21	DF	SRB	Nikola Cetina (from Spartak Subotica)

Out: Note: Flags indicate national team as defined under FIFA eligibility rules; some limited exceptions apply. Players may hold more than one non-FIFA nationality.

No.	Pos.	Nation	Player
10	MF	SRB	Lazar Čordašić (to Radnički 1912 Sombor)
14	FW	SRB	Aleksa Denković (to Sinđelić Beograd)
17	MF	SRB	Nebojša Bastajić (to Inđija)
21	FW	SRB	Ognjen Damnjanović (to Inđija)
24	DF	SRB	Srđan Bečelić (to (Bosnia and Herzegovina) Radnik Bijeljina)
15	DF	SRB	Slobodan Lalić (to (Romania) Miercurea Ciuc)
12	GK	SRB	Tamás Hajagos (to (Hungary) Szentlőrinc)
26	DF	SRB	Nemanja Nenezić (to Bačka 1901)
—	DF	SRB	Igor Tatić (to Spartak Subotica)

=== Zlatibor Čajetina ===
In: Note: Flags indicate national team as defined under FIFA eligibility rules; some limited exceptions apply. Players may hold more than one non-FIFA nationality.

No.	Pos.	Nation	Player
11	FW	SRB	Aleksandar Stojanovski (from Dinamo Pančevo)
9	FW	SRB	Milan Đokić (from Moravac Mrštane)
20	MF	SRB	Stefan Mihajlović (from Mladost Lučani)
29	MF	SRB	Predrag Medić (from Spartak Subotica)
19	FW	SRB	Uroš Vukićević (from Spartak Subotica)
26	GK	SRB	Marko Ristanović (from Sloboda Užice)
18	FW	SRB	Miloš Stojanović (from (Thailand) Udon Thani)
25	DF	BIH	Milan Mirić (from Sloboda Užice)
8	MF	SRB	Nikola Lukić (from Dinamo Minsk)
3	DF	MNE	Mihailo Tomković (free, last with (Latvia) Liepāja)
6	DF	SRB	Nenad Rašević (from Mačva Šabac)

Out: Note: Flags indicate national team as defined under FIFA eligibility rules; some limited exceptions apply. Players may hold more than one non-FIFA nationality.

No.	Pos.	Nation	Player
9	FW	SRB	Dejan Vidić (to Red Star Belgrade)
26	DF	SRB	Nemanja Anđelković (to Javor)
14	MF	SRB	Stefan Grbović (to Radnički Kragujevac)
8	MF	SRB	Aleksa Vujić (to Sinđelić Beograd)
20	FW	SRB	Vladimir Petrović (to Zemun)
6	DF	SRB	Stevan Radulović (to Kolubara)
11	MF	SRB	Vladimir Ćirović (to Kolubara)
29	DF	SRB	Đorđe Mihailović (to Kolubara)
27	FW	MNE	Nikola Vućić (to FAP)
19	FW	SRB	Goran Potkozarac (to ČSK Čelarevo)
33	DF	SRB	Aleksandar Tasić (to (Sweden) Vasalund)

=== Sinđelić Beograd ===
In: Note: Flags indicate national team as defined under FIFA eligibility rules; some limited exceptions apply. Players may hold more than one non-FIFA nationality.

No.	Pos.	Nation	Player
4	DF	CHN	Zhang Yue (loan return from Bežanija)
3	MF	SRB	Jovica Blagojević (on loan from Voždovac)
7	MF	SRB	Stefan Matijević (from Kolubara)
9	FW	SRB	Đorđe Ivković (from Stepojevac Vaga)
23	FW	SRB	Marko Jović (on loan from Rad)
28	DF	CHN	Yimuran Kuerban (from (Czech Republic) Mohelnice)
15	FW	SRB	Aleksa Denković (from TSC)
20	MF	SRB	Aleksa Vujić (from Zlatibor Čajetina)
6	MF	SRB	Filip Osman (from Budućnost Dobanovci)
21	FW	SRB	Dragan Radosavljević (from Polet Ljubić)
31	FW	KEN	Albert Muema (from (Kenya) Ligi Ndogo)
12	MF	AUS	Stephen Frantzeskakis (from (Australia) Box Hill United)

Out: Note: Flags indicate national team as defined under FIFA eligibility rules; some limited exceptions apply. Players may hold more than one non-FIFA nationality.

No.	Pos.	Nation	Player
6	MF	SRB	Nedeljko Piščević (loan return to Rad)
25	MF	SRB	Vasilije Janjić (loan return to Voždovac)
9	FW	SRB	Nemanja Ivanović (to (Ukraine) Zorya Luhansk)
12	DF	SRB	Ivan Kričak (to Radnik Surdulica)
10	MF	SRB	Lazar Tufegdžić (to Spartak Subotica)
23	FW	SRB	Marko Ćirić (to OFK Beograd)
3	MF	SRB	Aleksa Bajčić (to Lokomotiva Beograd)
29	FW	SRB	Marko Radman (to Radnički Nova Pazova)
—	MF	SRB	Ognjen Popadić (to Radnički Beograd)
4	MF	SRB	Mihajlo Cakić (to (Tajikistan) Istiklol)
7	MF	SRB	Miloš Đorđević (to (Bosnia and Herzegovina) Tekstilac Derventa)

=== Metalac G. M. ===
In: Note: Flags indicate national team as defined under FIFA eligibility rules; some limited exceptions apply. Players may hold more than one non-FIFA nationality.

No.	Pos.	Nation	Player
7	DF	SRB	Bojan Gočanin (loan return from Takovo)
—		SRB	Aleksa Milićević (loan return from Lunjevica)
10	FW	SRB	Aleksandar Ješić (from Voždovac)
9	FW	SRB	Veljko Plazinić (from Sloga Požega)
8	MF	SRB	Stefan Đurić (from Teleoptik)
23	DF	SRB	Igor Vukomanović (from LFK Mladost Lučani)
20	DF	SRB	Miloš Pajević (from Šumadija Aranđelovac)
—	MF	SRB	Uroš Mutavdžić (from Rad)
—		SRB	Stefan Gojković (from Sloga Kraljevo)

Out: Note: Flags indicate national team as defined under FIFA eligibility rules; some limited exceptions apply. Players may hold more than one non-FIFA nationality.

No.	Pos.	Nation	Player
20	FW	SRB	Nikola Čumić (to Radnički Niš)
7	MF	SRB	Ersan Rovčanin (to TSC)
23	DF	SRB	Igor Filipović (to (Kuwait) Al-Shabab)
10	DF	SRB	Marko Anđić (to (Bosnia and Herzegovina) Zvijezda 09)
16	MF	SRB	Branislav Tomić (to Bačka BP)
9	FW	SRB	Stefan Radojičić (on loan to Takovo)
—	GK	SRB	Miloš Jokić (to Lunjevica, was on loan at Prijevor)
77	MF	SRB	Dino Šarac (to Novi Pazar)
22	DF	SRB	Petar Pavlović (on loan to Bežanija)

=== Radnički Kragujevac ===
In: Note: Flags indicate national team as defined under FIFA eligibility rules; some limited exceptions apply. Players may hold more than one non-FIFA nationality.

No.	Pos.	Nation	Player
30	FW	SRB	Miloš Đorđević (from Šumadija 1903)
6	MF	SRB	Stefan Grbović (from Zlatibor Čajetina)
25	DF	SRB	Luka Milisavljević (from Jagodina)
4	DF	SRB	Aleksandar Popović (from Tutin)
1	GK	SRB	Stefan Vasić (from Jagodina)
33	MF	SRB	Željko Žerađanin (from Vršac)
28	DF	SRB	Nikola Rađen (from Crvena Zvezda Novi Sad)
25	FW	SRB	Luka Milisavljević (from Dunav Prahovo)
30	FW	SRB	Miloš Đorđević (from Šumadija Kragujevac)
—	DF	SRB	Dejan Dimitrijević (from Karađorđe Topola)
—	MF	SRB	Milentije Lepović (from Karađorđe Topola)
—	FW	SRB	Petar Simović (from Karađorđe Topola)
5	DF	BIH	Branko Ostojić (from Voždovac)

Out: Note: Flags indicate national team as defined under FIFA eligibility rules; some limited exceptions apply. Players may hold more than one non-FIFA nationality.

No.	Pos.	Nation	Player
25	FW	SRB	Slavko Cvjetinović (to Radnički Nova Pazova)
4	MF	SRB	Filip Markišić (released)
28	FW	KOR	Hwang Jong-won (loan return to Rad)
—		KOR	Suh Bo-hyeon (on loan to Radnički Beograd)
6	DF	BIH	Milan Lalić (to Budućnost Dobanovci)
9	MF	SRB	Nikola Cvijović (on loan to Šumadija Kragujevac)
1	GK	SRB	Borivoje Rumenić (to Polet Ljubić)
5	DF	SRB	Milan Ilić (to (Slovenia) Krško)
19	FW	SRB	Andrija Ratković (to (Czech Republic) Písek)

=== Bežanija ===
In: Note: Flags indicate national team as defined under FIFA eligibility rules; some limited exceptions apply. Players may hold more than one non-FIFA nationality.

No.	Pos.	Nation	Player
20	MF	SRB	Radovan Avram (on loan from Voždovac)
8	FW	SRB	Aleksandar Katanić (from Bačka BP)
2	DF	SRB	Nikola Petrović (from Crvena zvezda MML)
21	MF	SRB	Marko Vučetić (from Sloboda Užice)
—		SRB	Dušan Nedović (from OFK Beograd)
16	MF	SRB	Nenad Ilić (from Čukarički)
6	DF	SRB	Luka Jeličić (from Kolubara)
13	DF	SRB	Petar Pavlović (on loan from Metalac G. M.)
7	MF	SRB	Nikola Divac (from (Montenegro) Igalo 1929)
22	GK	SRB	Miloš Rnić (from (Mongolia) Deren)

Out: Note: Flags indicate national team as defined under FIFA eligibility rules; some limited exceptions apply. Players may hold more than one non-FIFA nationality.

No.	Pos.	Nation	Player
16	FW	SRB	Dejan Parađina (loan return to Rad)
22	GK	SRB	Miloš Krunić (loan return to Zemun)
8	MF	SRB	Đorđe Radovanović (to Spartak Subotica)
2	DF	SRB	Marko Mijailović (to Mačva Šabac)
15	DF	SRB	Marko Bašanović (to (Bosnia and Herzegovina) Zvijezda 09)
21	MF	SRB	Krsta Bojić (on loan to Napredak Kruševac)
99	FW	SRB	Lazar Lekić (on loan to Leštane)
4	DF	CHN	Zhang Yue (loan return from Bežanija)
—	MF	SRB	Luka Sekulić (loan extension to Sremčica)
18	FW	SRB	Marko Simić (to Sloboda Užice)
6	DF	SRB	Stefan Filipović (to (Montenegro) Budućnost Podgorica)

=== Trayal ===
In: Note: Flags indicate national team as defined under FIFA eligibility rules; some limited exceptions apply. Players may hold more than one non-FIFA nationality.

No.	Pos.	Nation	Player
—	MF	SRB	Nemanja Radmanović (loan return from SFS Borac Paraćin)
77	MF	SRB	Marko Stanojević (from Dinamo Vranje)
14	MF	GAM	Ousman Marong (from (The Gambia) Superstars Academy)
11	FW	SRB	Marko Kilibarda (on loan from Mladost Lučani)
9	FW	SRB	Marko Radivojević (on loan from Dinamo Vranje)
—	FW	GAM	Lamin Jobe (from (The Gambia) Superstars Academy)
—	GK	SRB	Veljko Marković (from Napredak Kruševac)

Out: Note: Flags indicate national team as defined under FIFA eligibility rules; some limited exceptions apply. Players may hold more than one non-FIFA nationality.

No.	Pos.	Nation	Player
9	FW	CMR	Michel Vaillant (loan return to Mladost Lučani)
—		SRB	Jovan Milošević (on loan to Temnić 1924, was on loan at Trstenik PPT)
77	MF	SRB	Sreten Atanasković (to Borac Sakule)
—	MF	SRB	Miodrag Maljković (to Lokomotiva Beograd)
—		SRB	Dimitrije Tomić (to Bukovik Ražanj)
23	MF	SRB	Miloš Cvetković (to Tutin)
—	MF	SRB	Christian Vujčić (loan extension to SFS Borac Paraćin)
—	MF	SRB	Marko Ristić (to Trstenik PPT, was on loan at Jedinstvo Mudrakovac)
11	FW	SRB	Aleksa Andrejić (to Inđija)

=== Žarkovo ===
In: Note: Flags indicate national team as defined under FIFA eligibility rules; some limited exceptions apply. Players may hold more than one non-FIFA nationality.

No.	Pos.	Nation	Player
32	DF	MNE	Vasilije Radenović (from Proleter Novi Sad)
4	DF	SRB	Nemanja Marković (from Javor Ivanjica)
50	FW	KOR	Hwang Jong-won (on loan from Rad)
1	GK	MNE	Nemanja Šćekić (from Zemun)
14	FW	MNE	Drago Milović (from (Montenegro) Grbalj)
15	DF	SRB	Đorđe Kovačević (from Crvena zvezda MML)
10	MF	SRB	Mladen Lukić (from Mačva Šabac)
17	FW	SRB	Zoran Mihailović (from Proleter Novi Sad)
8	MF	SRB	Danko Kiković (on loan from Mladost Lučani)
19	MF	SRB	Miloš Čudić (from (Bosnia and Herzegovina) Borac Banja Luka)
12	GK	SRB	Nemanja Bjelan (free, last with (Lithuania) Jonava)
6	DF	SRB	Milenko Škorić (from (Romania) Pandurii Târgu Jiu)
24	MF	SRB	Uroš Jovanović (free, last with (Slovenia) Krško)
—		IND	Rahul Soni (from (India) Jaipur)

Out: Note: Flags indicate national team as defined under FIFA eligibility rules; some limited exceptions apply. Players may hold more than one non-FIFA nationality.

No.	Pos.	Nation	Player
32	DF	SRB	Adnan Islamović (loan return to Partizan)
12	GK	BIH	Slaviša Bogdanović (to (Bosnia and Herzegovina) Velež Mostar)
15	DF	SRB	Aleksandar Milanović (to Grafičar Beograd)
14	DF	LBR	Omega Roberts (to Novi Pazar)
10	MF	SRB	Miodrag Milenković (to Novi Pazar)
24	FW	SRB	Stefan Trivković (to Polet Ljubić)
33	DF	SRB	Srđa Knežević (to Radnički Beograd)
17	FW	SRB	Miloš Bogunović (to Donji Petrovci)

=== Bečej ===
In: Note: Flags indicate national team as defined under FIFA eligibility rules; some limited exceptions apply. Players may hold more than one non-FIFA nationality.

No.	Pos.	Nation	Player
—	GK	SRB	Isidor Milovanov (loan return from Vojvodina Bačko Gradište)
—		SRB	Lazar Vranješ (loan return from Jedinstvo Novi Bečej)
—	MF	SRB	Davor Jelić (loan return from Borac Novi Sad)
17	DF	SRB	Marko Mandić (loan extension from Vojvodina)
14	MF	SRB	Aleksandar Mirkov (on loan from Vojvodina)
15	DF	SRB	Milovan Petrić (from OFK Vršac)
27	MF	SRB	Mehmed Avdić (from (Spain) Coruxo)
10	FW	SRB	Filip Bajić (from Bačka BP)
6	DF	SRB	Miloš Živković (from Bačka BP)
9	FW	SRB	Marko Matijašević (from Radnički 1912 Sombor)
21	MF	SRB	Dragoljub Vasić (from Mladost Bački Jarak)
23	FW	SRB	Kosta Aleksić (on loan from Čukarički)

Out: Note: Flags indicate national team as defined under FIFA eligibility rules; some limited exceptions apply. Players may hold more than one non-FIFA nationality.

No.	Pos.	Nation	Player
23	MF	SRB	Aleksandar Erak (loan return to TSC)
9	FW	SRB	Mladen Kovačević (to (China) Nantong Zhiyun)
3	DF	SRB	Vukašin Jelić (to Hajduk Kula)
—	MF	SRB	David Dujić (was on loan, now signed for Radnički Nova Pazova)
10	FW	SRB	Nemanja Grujić (to Kabel)
15	DF	SRB	Igor Tatić (to Radnički Zrenjanin)
18	FW	SRB	David Knežević (to Radnički 1912 Sombor)
14	MF	SRB	Stefan Cvijić (to Sloga Erdevik)

=== Borac Čačak ===
In: Note: Flags indicate national team as defined under FIFA eligibility rules; some limited exceptions apply. Players may hold more than one non-FIFA nationality.

No.	Pos.	Nation	Player

Out: Note: Flags indicate national team as defined under FIFA eligibility rules; some limited exceptions apply. Players may hold more than one non-FIFA nationality.

No.	Pos.	Nation	Player
8	MF	SRB	Dušan Kuveljić (to Bačka BP)
9	FW	SRB	Nikola Tripković (to Spartak Subotica)
35	DF	SRB	Vladimir Otašević (to Spartak Subotica)
17	MF	SRB	Nemanja Radosavljević (on loan to Polet Ljubić)
11	MF	SRB	Filip Pantović (to BIP Čačak)

=== Budućnost Dobanovci ===
In: Note: Flags indicate national team as defined under FIFA eligibility rules; some limited exceptions apply. Players may hold more than one non-FIFA nationality.

No.	Pos.	Nation	Player
12	GK	SRB	Aleksandar Kirovski (from (North Macedonia) Vardar)
15	FW	SRB	Miloš Kukolj (loan extension from Partizan)
2	DF	BIH	Milan Lalić (from Radnički Kragujevac)
5	MF	SRB	Aleksandar Stojković (from Dinamo Vranje)
23	MF	SRB	Saša Filipović (from (Bosnia and Herzegovina) Zvijezda 09)
25	FW	SRB	Filip Beriša (from BSK Borča)
8	FW	SRB	Luka Lemić (from Brodarac)
3	DF	SRB	Mihajlo Radjčić (from Omladinac Novi Banovci)
32	GK	SRB	Milan Opačić (from Borac Sakule)
19	MF	SRB	Stevan Luković (from Zemun)
16	MF	LBN	Mohamad Abdallah Jawad (from (Luxembourg) Union Titus Pétange)

Out: Note: Flags indicate national team as defined under FIFA eligibility rules; some limited exceptions apply. Players may hold more than one non-FIFA nationality.

No.	Pos.	Nation	Player
22	FW	SRB	Lazar Vladisavljević (loan return to Mačva Šabac)
—		SRB	Nikola Eraković (on loan to GSP Polet Dorćol, was on loan at Radnički Sutjeska)
5	MF	SRB	Filip Osman (to Sinđelić Beograd)
16	FW	SRB	Miloš Reljić (to Sloboda Užice)
8	FW	SRB	Vladimir Peralović (to Sloboda Užice)
19	MF	SRB	Nemanja Vidić (to Inđija)
23	FW	SRB	Marko Peršić (to Dunav Stari Banovci)
3	DF	BIH	Milenko Malović (to (Bosnia and Herzegovina) Tekstilac Derventa)
12	GK	SRB	Bojan Knežević (to (Uzbekistan) Kokand 1912)

=== Teleoptik ===
In: Note: Flags indicate national team as defined under FIFA eligibility rules; some limited exceptions apply. Players may hold more than one non-FIFA nationality.

No.	Pos.	Nation	Player
22	MF	SRB	Jovan Kokir (on loan from Partizan)
11	MF	SRB	Strahinja Jovanović (on loan from Partizan)
27	FW	SRB	Nikola Lakčević (loan extension from Partizan)
19	FW	MNE	Filip Vorotović (from (Montenegro) Iskra Danilovgrad)
31	DF	SRB	Aleksa Damjanac (on loan from Partizan)
20	FW	SRB	Matija Babović (on loan from Partizan)
23	DF	MKD	Marko Simunović (on loan from, previously sold to Partizan)
41	GK	SRB	Đorđe Vukanić (on loan from Partizan)
21	MF	SRB	Filip Ilić (from free)

Out: Note: Flags indicate national team as defined under FIFA eligibility rules; some limited exceptions apply. Players may hold more than one non-FIFA nationality.

No.	Pos.	Nation	Player
41	GK	SRB	Aleksandar Popović (loan return to Partizan)
11	MF	SRB	Stefan Đurić (to Metalac G. M.)
19	MF	SRB	Milan Ilić (to IMT)
20	MF	SRB	Marko Jerotijević (to IMT)
—	GK	SRB	Jovica Mitrović (to Sloboda Užice)
28	DF	SRB	Lazar Petrović (to Sopot)
25	DF	BIH	Nemanja Vještica (loan return to Partizan)
14	MF	BFA	Dramane Salou (loan return to Partizan)

=== Sloboda Užice ===
In: Note: Flags indicate national team as defined under FIFA eligibility rules; some limited exceptions apply. Players may hold more than one non-FIFA nationality.

No.	Pos.	Nation	Player
—	DF	SRB	Dimitrije Tvrdišić (from Kolubara)
8	MF	SRB	Vladimir Molerović (from (Bosnia and Herzegovina) Drina Zvornik)
10	MF	SRB	Ivan Petrović (from Drina Ljubovija)
12	GK	SRB	Marko Jovanović (from Sevojno)
6	MF	SRB	Đorđe Simić (from Jedinstvo Surčin)
22	MF	SRB	Uroš Veljović (from FAP)
9	FW	SRB	Stefan Đurić (from Jagodina Tabane)
1	GK	SRB	Jovica Mitrović (from Teleoptik)
25	FW	SRB	Marko Simić (from Bežanija)
—	FW	MNE	Ljubomir Kovačević (from Zemun)
3	DF	SRB	Nikola Vučković (from Timočanin)
15	DF	SRB	Nemanja Živković (from OFK Beograd)
31	FW	SRB	Miloš Reljić (from Budućnost Dobanovci)
24	FW	SRB	Vladimir Peralović (from Budućnost Dobanovci)
19	DF	SRB	Đorđe Lazović (from Crvena Zvezda Novi Sad)
4	DF	SRB	Miloš Sekulić (from (Slovakia) MŠK Rimavská Sobota)
32	MF	SRB	Marko Milenković (from (Croatia) Rudeš)

Out: Note: Flags indicate national team as defined under FIFA eligibility rules; some limited exceptions apply. Players may hold more than one non-FIFA nationality.

No.	Pos.	Nation	Player
11	FW	SRB	Zoran Mihailović (loan return to Proleter Novi Sad)
19	MF	SRB	Matija Miketić (loan return to Mačva Šabac)
10	MF	SRB	Zoran Marušić (to (Belarus) Dnyapro Mogilev)
21	FW	SRB	Marko Rajković (to (North Macedonia) Sileks)
15	DF	SRB	Marko Ristić (to (Slovenia) Tabor)
5	MF	GHA	Joseph Bempah (to Proleter Novi Sad)
24	MF	SRB	Marko Vučetić (to Bežanija)
3	DF	SRB	Luka Šarac (to Jošanica)
1	GK	SRB	Jasmin Koč (to Jošanica)
4	DF	SRB	Dušan Tamindžić (to Radnički Obrenovac)
8	FW	MNE	Milovan Ilić (to Radnički Pirot)
23	GK	SRB	Marko Ristanović (to Zlatibor Čajetina)
29	DF	BIH	Milan Mirić (to Zlatibor Čajetina)
26	MF	SRB	Nikola Trifković (to Loznica)
5	DF	MDA	Serghei Diulgher (to (Moldova) Dinamo-Auto Tiraspol, previously brought from the same club)
30	MF	SRB	Aleksandar Mitrović (to (Slovakia) Tatran Prešov)
31	MF	SRB	Nemanja Obrenović (to (Belarus) Energetik-BGU Minsk)

=== Novi Pazar ===
In: Note: Flags indicate national team as defined under FIFA eligibility rules; some limited exceptions apply. Players may hold more than one non-FIFA nationality.

No.	Pos.	Nation	Player
32	MF	SRB	Ertan Marovac (on loan from Jošanica)
31	DF	SRB	Adnan Islamović (on loan from Partizan)
29	MF	SRB	Dino Šarac (from Metalac G. M.)
35	MF	SRB	Sead Župić (from Jagodina Tabane)
30	DF	LBR	Omega Roberts (from Žarkovo)
91	MF	SRB	Miodrag Milenković (from Žarkovo)
90	GK	SRB	Denis Krasić (from Napredak Kruševac)
38	MF	SRB	Edin Selimović (from Moravac Mrštane)
41	FW	SRB	Marko Platiša (from Stepojevac Vaga)
9	FW	SRB	Dženan Plojović (from Jagodina Tabane)
33	FW	SRB	Aleksandar Milić (from (Greece) Enosi Aspropyrgou)
7	MF	SRB	Irfan Vusljanin (from (North Macedonia) Belasica)
13	DF	SRB	Jasmin Trtovac (from (Turkey) Erzurum BB)
21	GK	MNE	Zoran Aković (from (Montenegro) Rudar Pljevlja)
51	MF	SRB	Nemanja Petrov (from (North Macedonia) Belasica)
34	MF	SRB	Ervin Kačar (from (Kosovo) Ferizaj)

Out: Note: Flags indicate national team as defined under FIFA eligibility rules; some limited exceptions apply. Players may hold more than one non-FIFA nationality.

No.	Pos.	Nation	Player
55	MF	SRB	Anel Ramović (on loan to Novi Pazar 1928)
90	GK	SRB	Tamer Preljević (on loan to Jošanica)
21	MF	SRB	Abdulaziz Ragipović (on loan to Tutin)
13	DF	SRB	Kerim Halilović (to Jošanica)
9	FW	SRB	Jovan Mihajlović (to Sloga Požega)
28	MF	MNE	Bogdan Rmuš (to Internacional)
20	DF	SRB	Anes Husović (to Internacional)

== See also ==
- Serbian SuperLiga
- 2018–19 Serbian SuperLiga
- Serbian First League
- 2018–19 Serbian First League
