= 2020–21 Serbian First League =

Serbian First League
- Season: 2020–21
- Dates: 14 August 2020 – 19 May 2021
- Champions: Radnički 1923
- Promoted: Radnički 1923; Kolubara
- Relegated: Borac 1926; Dinamo; Dubočica; Trayal; Radnički Pirot; Sloga Kraljevo; Zemun; Jagodina
- Matches: 306
- Goals: 704 (2.3 per match)
- Top goalscorer: Dragiša Komarčević (14 goals)
- Biggest home win: Loznica 7–0 Dubočica
- Biggest away win: Trayal 0–4 Borac 1926
- Highest scoring: Loznica 4–4 Borac 1926
- Longest winning run: Kabel 7 games
- Longest unbeaten run: Radnički 1923 12 games
- Longest winless run: Jagodina 16 games
- Longest losing run: Sloga 6 games

The 2020–21 Serbian First League was the 16th season of the Serbian First League since its establishment.

== League format ==
The league consisted of 18 teams: ten teams from the 2019–20 Serbian First League and eight new teams promoted from 2019–20 Serbian League. Teams played each other in double round-robin format, with top two teams being promoted to Serbian SuperLiga and bottom eight teams being relegated to Serbian League.

== Team changes ==
The following teams have changed division since the 2019–20 season.

=== To First League ===
Promoted from Serbian League

- Borac 1926
- Dubočica
- IMT
- Jagodina
- Loznica
- Radnički Sremska Mitrovica
- Sloga
- Železničar

=== From First League ===
Relegated to Serbian League

- Sinđelić
- Smederevo 1924

Promoted to 2020–21 Serbian SuperLiga

- Bačka
- Metalac
- Novi Pazar
- Zlatibor

== Teams ==
Location of teams in the 2020–21 Serbian First league
Locations of the 2020–21 Serbian First League teams from Belgrade

Team	City	Stadium	Capacity
Borac 1926	Čačak	Čačak City Stadium	8,000
Budućnost Dobanovci	Dobanovci	FK Budućnost Dobanovci Stadium	1,000
Dinamo	Vranje	Stadion Yumco	4,000
Dubočica	Leskovac	Leskovac City Stadium	7,000
Grafičar	Belgrade	Topčiderska zvezda	1,000
IMT	Belgrade	Stadion FK IMT	1,150
Jagodina	Jagodina	Jagodina City Stadium	15,000
Kabel	Novi Sad	FK Kabel Stadium	2,000
Kolubara	Lazarevac	FK Kolubara Stadium	2,500
Loznica	Loznica	Lagator Stadium	5,000
Radnički 1923	Kragujevac	Čika Dača	15,100
Radnički	Pirot	Stadion Dragan Nikolić	13,816
Radnički	Sremska Mitrovica	Stadion FK Radnički	2,000
Sloga	Kraljevo	Kraljevo City Stadium	4,000
Trayal	Kruševac	FK Trayal Stadium	1,500
Zemun	Belgrade	Zemun Stadium	9,588
Žarkovo	Belgrade	FK Žarkovo Stadium	610
Železničar	Pančevo	SC Mladost	1,200

=== Personnel, Kits and Main sponsor ===
Note: Flags indicate national team as has been defined under FIFA eligibility rules. Players and Managers may hold more than one non-FIFA nationality.

Team	Head coach	Captain	Kit manufacturer	General Sponsor
Borac 1926	(Serbia) Vladimir Stanisavljević	(Serbia) Lazar Obradović	Givova	Auto Čačak doo
Budućnost Dobanovci	(Serbia) Dušan Kljajić	(Serbia) Slobodan Lučić	Macron	Gebrüder Weiss
Dinamo	(Serbia) Dragan Antić	(Serbia) Mlađan Stevanović	Nike	mt:s
Dubočica	(Serbia) Aleksandar Kuzmanović	(North Macedonia) Dušan Savić	NAAI	ButanGas Group
Grafičar*	(Serbia) Milija Žižić	(Serbia) Aleksandar Stanković	NAAI	Millenium Team
IMT	(Serbia) Zoran Rendulić	(Serbia) Nemanja Marković	NAAI	SI 011 International doo Beograd
Jagodina	(Serbia) Darko Milisavljević	(Serbia) Strahinja Jovančić	NAAI	Municipality of Jagodina
Kabel	(Serbia) Zoran Vasiljević	(Serbia) Stefan Petrović	Kelme	Put-invest doo
Kolubara	(Serbia) Zoran Milinković	(Serbia) Nikola Vasiljević	Seven	EPS RB Kolubara
Loznica	(Serbia) Dragan Micić	(Serbia) Miloš Spasenović	Bull	Municipality of Loznica
Radnički 1923	(Serbia) Aleksandar Linta	(Serbia) Stevan Kovačević	Jako	Municipality of Kragujevac
Radnički Pirot	(Serbia) Dragan Perišić	(Serbia) Filip Tolić	Umbro	Municipality of Pirot
Radnički Sremska Mitrovica	(Serbia) Goran Dragoljić	(Serbia) Nemanja Petrović	Macron	Metalfer Steel Mill doo
Sloga	(Serbia) Boris Bunjak	(Serbia) Đorđe Andrić	NAAI	Municipality of Kraljevo
Trayal	(Serbia) Goran Lazarević	(Serbia) Milan Gašić	Jako	Trayal Corporation
Zemun	(Serbia) Milan Rašić	(Serbia) Marko Đalović	Joma	Dunav Insurance
Žarkovo	(Serbia) Milan Kuljić	(Montenegro) Nemanja Šćekić	Macron	Rubikon SC
Železničar	(Serbia) Marko Perović	(Serbia) Dušan Plavšić	NAAI	Municipality of Pančevo

Nike is the official ball supplier for Serbian First League.

Kelme is the official sponsor of the Referee's Committee of the Football Association of Serbia.

- Grafičar is affiliated and branched with Red Star Belgrade

=== Managerial changes ===
Team	Outgoing manager	Manner of departure	Date of vacancy	Position in table	Incoming manager	Date of appointment
Sloga	(Serbia) Petar Divić	Sacked	06 September 2020	18th	(Serbia) Boris Bunjak	06 September 2020
Radnički Pirot	(Serbia) Dejan Čelar	Resigned	11 September 2020	10th	(Serbia) Nikola Puača	25 September 2020
Grafičar	(Serbia) Milija Žižić	Resigned	14 September 2020	6th	(Serbia) Radomir Koković	23 September 2020
Dubočica	(Serbia) Aleksandar Kuzmanović	Resigned	21 September 2020	15th	(Serbia) Saša Mrkić	22 September 2020
Radnički Pirot	(Serbia) Nikola Puača	Resigned	11 April 2021	16th	(Serbia) Dragan Perišić	15 April 2021

=== Foreign players ===
- Foreign players: The number of foreign players that clubs can use during the game is four.

Team	Player 1	Player 2	Player 3	Player 4	Naturalized Players
Borac Čačak	(Ghana) Joseph Bempah	(Ghana) Abdul Rashid Obuobi	(Russia) Stanislav Goldin		
Budućnost Dobanovci	(Nigeria) Emeka Emerun	(South Korea) Lee Jong-chan	(Cameroon) Michel Vaillant		
Dinamo Vranje	(Austria) Miroslav Orlić	(Brazil) Val Baiano			(Bosnia and Herzegovina) → (Serbia) Marko Čubrilo
Dubočica	(Nigeria) Okomayin Segun Onimisi	(Ukraine) Maksym Andrushchenko			(North Macedonia) → (Serbia) Dušan Savić
Grafičar	(Kenya) Richard Odada	(Slovenia) Vanja Panić	(Bulgaria) Preslav Petrov	(Jamaica) Norman Campbell	(North Macedonia) → (Serbia) Aleksandar Todorovski
IMT	(Ivory Coast) Ismaël Béko Fofana				(Greece) → (Serbia) Dimitrios Tzinovits
Jagodina					
Kabel	(Nigeria) Cyril Nebo	(Montenegro) Petar Pavlićević			
Kolubara	(Bosnia and Herzegovina) Arsen Knežević				
Loznica					(Bosnia and Herzegovina) → (Serbia) Branislav Ružić (Switzerland) → (Serbia) Mihailo Bogićević
Žarkovo	(Russia) Kyril Pakhonov				(Montenegro) → (Serbia) Nemanja Šćekić (Bosnia and Herzegovina) → (Serbia) Nenad Kiso
Radnički 1923					
Radnički Pirot	(North Macedonia) Marko Gjorgjievski	(Cameroon) Guy Edoa			
Radnički Sremska Mitrovica	(Montenegro) Milan Jelovac	(Ghana) Sadick Abubakar	(Georgia (country)) Revaz Injgia		
Sloga Kraljevo	(Nigeria) Moses John				(Montenegro) → (Serbia) Marko Vidović (Bosnia and Herzegovina) → (Serbia) Marko Mihajlović
Trayal	(The Gambia) Ousman Joof	(Montenegro) Mirko Drašković			
Zemun	(Montenegro) Nikola Pejović				
Železničar	(Ghana) Zakaria Suraka				(North Macedonia) → (Serbia) Georgije Jankulov

== Transfers ==
For the list of transfers involving First League clubs during 2020–21 season, please see: List of Serbian football transfers summer 2020.

== League table ==
Pos	Team	Pld	W	D	L	GF	GA	GD	Pts	Qualification
1	Radnički 1923 (C, P)	34	20	9	5	52	26	+26	69 (Note: Head-to-head away goals: Radnički 1923 1, Kolubara 0.)	Promotion to the Serbian SuperLiga
2	Kolubara (P)	34	21	6	7	53	31	+22	69	Promotion to the Serbian SuperLiga
3	Kabel	34	18	11	5	41	18	+23	65	
4	IMT	34	18	6	10	57	35	+22	60	
5	Loznica	34	15	9	10	57	42	+15	54	
6	Žarkovo	34	16	5	13	35	34	+1	53	
7	Grafičar	34	13	12	9	46	34	+12	51	
8	Budućnost	34	14	8	12	39	37	+2	50	
9	Radnički Sremska Mitrovica	34	14	5	15	39	30	+9	47	
10	Železničar	34	13	5	16	38	43	−5	44	
11	Radnički Pirot (R)	34	10	9	15	32	46	−14	39 (Note: Head-to-head away goals: Radnički Pirot 1, Dubočica 0.)	Relegation to Serbian League
12	Dubočica (R)	34	9	12	13	30	43	−13	39	Relegation to Serbian League
13	Dinamo (R)	34	11	5	18	39	53	−14	38	Relegation to Serbian League
14	Borac 1926 (R)	34	11	9	14	38	37	+1	36 (Note: Borac were deducted 6 points due to match fixing.)	Relegation to Serbian League
15	Trayal (R)	34	9	8	17	31	44	−13	35	Relegation to Serbian League
16	Jagodina (R)	34	7	14	13	30	48	−18	29 (Note: Jagodina were deducted 6 points due to match fixing.)	Relegation to Serbian League
17	Zemun (R)	34	7	6	21	24	51	−27	27	Relegation to Serbian League
18	Sloga (R)	34	5	11	18	24	53	−29	26	Relegation to Serbian League

Updated to match(es) played on 19 May 2021. Source: Prva Liga (in Serbian), Soccerway
Rules for classification: 1) Points; 2) Head-to-head points; 3) Head-to-head goal difference; 4) Head-to-head goals scored; 5) Head-to-head away goals scored (if two teams tied); 6) Goal difference; 7) Goals scored; 8) Fair play ranking; 9) Draw.
(C) Champions; (P) Promoted; (R) Relegated

== Results ==
Home \ Away	RDK	KOL	KBL	IMT	ŽAR	BDO	LOZ	GRA	RDS	ŽEL	BOR	DVR	DUB	TRA	RDP	ZEM	JAG	SLO
Radnički 1923		2–0	0–0	3–1	3–2	2–0	1–0	3–1	2–0	3–1	3–0	2–0	0–0	1–0	2–1	2–1	4–2	4–0
Kolubara	3–1		0–0	2–2	1–0	1–0	1–2	1–0	1–0	3–1	3–1	1–0	1–0	2–1	2–1	1–1	1–0	2–1
Kabel	1–1	0–1		2–0	2–0	0–1	0–0	1–1	1–0	2–0	0–1	2–1	3–1	1–1	1–1	1–0	2–2	2–0
IMT	0–1	1–0	0–2		1–0	5–2	2–3	1–0	0–2	1–3	0–1	3–0	3–1	0–0	2–0	2–0	2–0	6–1
Žarkovo	2–0	0–3	0–2	1–3		2–0	2–0	2–1	1–0	0–1	1–0	2–2	1–0	1–0	1–0	0–1	0–0	2–0
Budućnost	1–1	0–1	0–1	2–1	2–1		2–0	1–1	1–1	1–1	2–1	0–1	1–1	1–0	3–1	1–0	3–0	1–0
Loznica	3–1	4–2	0–0	1–2	1–2	0–0		1–2	2–1	0–3	4–4	3–3	7–0	1–0	1–1	6–0	4–2	2–1
Grafičar	0–2	0–0	1–2	2–2	1–1	2–1	1–2		2–0	3–0	1–1	2–0	1–1	4–1	0–0	1–0	2–0	5–1
Radnički Sremska Mitrovica	0–1	1–1	1–1	1–2	0–1	2–1	0–1	3–1		2–0	1–2	3–0	3–0	1–2	1–2	2–0	1–1	1–0
Železničar	0–1	2–1	0–2	0–3	2–2	2–1	1–0	1–1	0–1		1–0	2–0	0–0	1–2	0–1	2–0	5–2	1–0
Borac 1926	1–2	1–2	1–1	1–1	2–0	1–2	0–1	0–1	0–1	2–1		0–1	1–0	2–2	3–1	1–0	0–0	3–0
Dinamo	2–1	2–4	0–2	1–3	2–0	2–3	2–3	0–0	1–0	3–1	0–1		1–2	3–1	3–2	1–0	0–1	3–1
Dubočica	2–2	1–3	1–0	1–0	1–2	0–1	0–0	0–0	0–1	2–1	1–1	1–2		1–0	3–2	3–1	3–1	0–0
Trayal	0–0	1–0	0–1	2–3	0–2	2–1	1–0	4–1	0–2	2–1	0–4	0–0	0–1		1–2	2–1	3–0	0–1
Radnički Pirot	1–0	1–1	0–1	0–2	2–1	2–2	2–1	0–3	1–0	0–1	0–0	1–0	1–0	1–1		2–1	0–1	1–1
Zemun	1–1	1–4	1–0	0–0	0–1	0–1	1–2	1–2	0–3	0–2	1–1	3–2	0–0	3–1	2–1		0–1	1–0
Jagodina	0–0	0–3	2–3	0–3	0–0	1–1	0–0	0–0	1–3	1–0	2–1	1–1	1–1	1–1	4–0	1–1		2–0
Sloga	0–0	3–1	0–2	0–0	1–2	1–0	2–2	1–3	1–1	1–1	1–0	2–0	2–2	0–0	1–1	1–2	0–0	

Updated to match(es) played on 19 May 2021. Source: Prva liga (in Serbian)
Legend: Blue = home team win; Yellow = draw; Red = away team win.
For upcoming matches, an "a" indicates there is an article about the rivalry between the two participants.

== Individual statistics ==
=== Top goalscorers ===
As of matches played on 19 May 2021.

Pos	Scorer	Teams	Goals
1	(Bosnia and Herzegovina) Dragiša Komarčević	Loznica	14
2	(North Macedonia) Dušan Savić	Dubočica	12
2	(Serbia) Aleksandar Mesarović	Kabel	12
4	(Serbia) Goran Matić	Loznica	11
4	(Serbia) Slobodan Stanojlović	Loznica	11

=== Hat-tricks ===
Player	For	Against	Result	Date
(Serbia) Nemanja Stojić	Grafičar	Sloga	5–1	21 November 2020
(North Macedonia) Dušan Savić	Dubočica	Radnički Pirot	3–2	28 November 2020
(Serbia) Predrag Sikimić	Železničar	Jagodina	5–2	7 April 2021
(Serbia) Slobodan Stanojlović	Loznica	Zemun	6–0	15 May 2021
