= Marko Mandić (footballer) =

Serbian footballer

Personal information
- Date of birth: 11 March 1999 (age 27)
- Place of birth: Novi Sad, FR Yugoslavia
- Height: 1.85 m (6 ft 1 in)
- Position: Full-back

Team information
- Current team: FA Šiauliai
- Number: 21

Youth career
- Partizan
- Vojvodina

Senior career*
Years	Team	Apps	(Gls)
2018–2021	Vojvodina	1	(0)
2018–2019	→ Bečej (loan)	26	(0)
2019–2021	→ Kabel (loan)	35	(0)
2021–2022	Bačka Palanka	29	(0)
2022–2023	Mladost GAT	18	(0)
2024	Novi Sad 1921	16	(0)
2024	GOŠK Gabela	12	(1)
2025–	Šiauliai	40	(0)
- * Club domestic league appearances and goals as of 11 March 2026

Marko Mandić (Serbian Cyrillic: Марко Мандић; born 11 March 1999) is a Serbian footballer who plays for a lyga club FA Šiauliai.

== Club career ==
=== Vojvodina ===
On 17 May 2018 Mandić made his debut for Vojvodina, replacing Lazar Zličić in 6–1 away win against Čukarički. In July 2018, Mandić signed a four-year deal with the club.

=== Bačka ===
On 5 July 2021, he joined Bačka.

=== FA Šiauliai ===
On 31 January 2025 Marko Mandić signed with FA Šiauliai.

== Career statistics ==
As of 28 November 2020

Appearances and goals by club, season and competition
Club	Season	League			Cup		Continental		Total	
Club	Season	Division	Apps	Goals	Apps	Goals	Apps	Goals	Apps	Goals
Vojvodina	2017–18	Serbian SuperLiga	1	0	—		—		1	0
Vojvodina	Total		1	0	0	0	0	0	1	0
Bečej (loan)	2018–19	Serbian First League	26	0	—		—		26	0
Kabel (loan)	2019–20	Serbian First League	14	0	—		—		14	0
Kabel (loan)	2020–21	Serbian First League	10	0	1	0	—		11	0
Kabel (loan)	Total		24	0	1	0	0	0	25	0
Career total			51	0	1	0	0	0	52	0
