= Dejan Vidić =

Serbian footballer (born 1993)

Personal information
- Date of birth: 10 August 1993 (age 33)
- Place of birth: Peć, FR Yugoslavia
- Height: 1.97 m (6 ft 6 in)
- Position: Centre-forward

Team information
- Current team: Čelik Zenica
- Number: 9

Senior career*
Years	Team	Apps	(Gls)
- Morava Velika Plana
2012–2013	Napredak Markovac		
2013–2015	Pobeda Beloševac	39	(5)
2015–2016	Napredak Markovac		
2017	Karađorđe Topola	31	(11)
2018	Zlatibor Čajetina	32	(20)
2019–2022	Red Star Belgrade	0	(0)
2019	→ Zemun (loan)	11	(0)
2019	→ Grafičar Beograd (loan)	20	(3)
2020	→ Napredak Kruševac (loan)	4	(0)
2021–2022	→ Grafičar Beograd (loan)	40	(10)
2022–2023	IMT	33	(7)
2023–2026	Sloga Doboj	84	(24)
2026	Irtysh Pavlodar	2	(0)
2026–	Čelik Zenica	9	(0)
- * Club domestic league appearances and goals as of 31 October 2026

Dejan Vidić (Serbian Cyrillic: Дејан Видић; born 10 August 1993) is a Serbian professional footballer who plays as a forward for Bosnian Premier League club Čelik Zenica.

== Career statistics ==
=== Club ===
As of match played 31 October 2026

Appearances and goals by club, season and competition
Club	Season	League			National cup (Note: Includes Serbian Cup, Bosnian Cup)		Total	
Club	Season	Division	Apps	Goals	Apps	Goals	Apps	Goals
Zlatibor Čajetina	2018–19	Serbian First League	16	10	–		16	10
Zemun (loan)	2018–19	Serbian SuperLiga	11	0	–		11	0
Grafičar Beograd (loan)	2019–20	Serbian First League	20	3	–		20	3
Grafičar Beograd (loan)	2020–21	Serbian First League	16	4	0	0	16	4
Grafičar Beograd (loan)	2021–22	Serbian First League	24	6	1	0	25	6
Grafičar Beograd (loan)	Total		60	13	1	0	61	13
Napredak Kruševac (loan)	2019–20	Serbian SuperLiga	4	0	–		4	0
IMT	2022–23	Serbian First League	33	7	2	0	35	7
Sloga Doboj	2023–24	Bosnian Premier League	23	16	4	2	27	18
Sloga Doboj	2024–25	Bosnian Premier League	32	7	1	0	33	7
Sloga Doboj	2025–26	Bosnian Premier League	29	1	4	1	33	2
Sloga Doboj	Total		84	24	9	3	93	27
Irtysh Pavlodar	2026	Kazakhstan Premier League	2	0	–		2	0
Čelik Zenica	2026–27	Bosnian Premier League	9	0	0	0	9	0
Career total			219	54	12	3	231	57
