= Veljko Bogićević =

Serbian footballer

Personal information
- Full name: Veljko Bogićević
- Date of birth: 27 April 1999 (age 27)
- Place of birth: Peć, FR Yugoslavia
- Height: 1.84 m (6 ft 0 in)
- Position: Winger

Team information
- Current team: Borac Čačak
- Number: 9

Senior career*
Years	Team	Apps	(Gls)
2017–2019	Borac Čačak	46	(4)
2020–2022	Sloga Požega		
2022	Radnički Sombor		
2022	FAP Priboj		
2023-	Borac Čačak	25	(2)
- * Club domestic league appearances and goals as of 1 July 2025

Veljko Bogićević (Serbian Cyrillic: Вељко Богићевић; born 27 April 1999) is a Serbian footballer who played for Borac Čačak.

== Career statistics ==
As of 5 May 2019

Club	Season	League			Cup		Continental		Other		Total	
Club	Season	Division	Apps	Goals	Apps	Goals	Apps	Goals	Apps	Goals	Apps	Goals
Borac Čačak	2017–18	Serbian SuperLiga	10	0	1	0	—		—		11	0
Borac Čačak	2018–19	Serbian First League	36	4	2	0	—		—		38	4
Borac Čačak	Total		46	4	3	0	—		—		49	4
Career total			46	4	3	0	—		—		49	4
