= Nikola Šutić =

Serbian association football player

Personal information
- Full name: Nikola Šutić
- Date of birth: 14 April 1999 (age 27)
- Place of birth: Čačak, FR Yugoslavia
- Height: 1.76 m (5 ft 9 in)
- Position: Midfielder

Team information
- Current team: Polet Ljubić

Senior career*
Years	Team	Apps	(Gls)
2018–2019	Borac Čačak	34	(0)
2019–2020	BSK Borča		
2020–2021	Tutin		
2021–2022	Sloga Bajina Bašta		
2022–2023	Oratory Youths		
2023	Real Podunavci		
2024	Loznica		
2024	Đerdap Kladovo		
2024-	Polet Ljubić		
- * Club domestic league appearances and goals as of 5 May 2019

Nikola Šutić (Serbian Cyrillic: Никола Шутић; born 14 April 1999) is a Serbian footballer who plays as a midfielder for Polet Ljubić.

== Career ==
Ahead of the 2019–20 season, Šutić joined FK BSK Borča. He had a spell at Gozitan side Oratory Youths.

== Career statistics ==
As of 5 May 2019

Club	Season	League			Cup		Continental		Other		Total	
Club	Season	Division	Apps	Goals	Apps	Goals	Apps	Goals	Apps	Goals	Apps	Goals
Borac Čačak	2018–19	Serbian First League	34	0	2	0	—		—		36	0
Career total			34	0	2	0	—		—		36	0
