= Moussa Diakité (footballer, born 2003) =

Malian footballer (born 2003)

Personal information
- Date of birth: 4 November 2003 (age 22)
- Place of birth: Bamako, Mali
- Height: 1.89 m (6 ft 2 in)
- Position: Midfielder

Team information
- Current team: Çaykur Rizespor (on loan from Cádiz)

Youth career
- Etoiles Mandé
- 2022: Cádiz

Senior career*
Years	Team	Apps	(Gls)
2022–2024	Cádiz B	65	(0)
2023–	Cádiz	59	(4)
2026–	→ Çaykur Rizespor (loan)	0	(0)

International career^{‡}
2024–	Mali U23	3	(0)
2026–	Mali	1	(0)
- * Club domestic league appearances and goals as of 9 June 2026 ‡ National team caps and goals as of 31 March 2026

Moussa Diakité (born 4 November 2003) is a Malian professional footballer who plays as a midfielder for Turkish club Çaykur Rizespor, on loan from Spanish club Cádiz CF, and the Mali national team.

== Club career ==
Born in Bamako, Diakité played for local side Académie des Étoiles du Mandé before joining the youth categories of Cádiz CF in January 2022. He made his senior debut with the latter's reserves late in that month, coming on as a second-half substitute for Luka Cvetićanin in a 4–0 Segunda División RFEF home loss to Córdoba CF.

Diakité established himself as a regular starter for the B's during the 2022–23 season, and made his first team – and La Liga – debut on 4 December 2023, replacing Rubén Alcaraz late into a 1–1 away draw against RC Celta de Vigo.

On 26 August 2024, Diakité renewed his contract with the Andalusians until 2029. He scored his first professional goal on 25 May of the following year, netting the opener in a 4–0 home routing of SD Huesca.

On 14 August 2026, Diakité was loaned to Süper Lig club Çaykur Rizespor for one year.

== International career ==
On 8 July 2024, Diakité was included in the squad of the Mali national under-23 team for the 2024 Summer Olympics.

== Career statistics ==
=== Club ===
As of match played 21 March 2026

Appearances and goals by club, season and competition
Club	Season	League			Cup		Other		Total	
Club	Season	Division	Apps	Goals	Apps	Goals	Apps	Goals	Apps	Goals
Cádiz B	2021–22	Segunda Federación	1	0	—		—		1	0
Cádiz B	2022–23	Segunda Federación	30	0	—		—		30	0
Cádiz B	2023–24	Segunda Federación	30	0	—		—		30	0
Cádiz B	2024–25	Segunda Federación	4	0	—		—		4	0
Cádiz B	Total		65	0	—		—		65	0
Cádiz	2023–24	La Liga	1	0	0	0	—		1	0
Cádiz	2024–25	Segunda División	22	2	0	0	—		22	2
Cádiz	2025–26	Segunda División	29	2	2	0	—		31	2
Cádiz	Total		52	4	2	0	—		54	4
Career total			117	4	2	0	0	0	119	4

=== International ===
As of match played 31 March 2026

Appearances and goals by national team and year
National team	Year	Apps	Goals
Mali	2026	1	0
Total		1	0
