= Zoran Mihailović =

Serbian footballer

Personal information
- Full name: Zoran Mihailović
- Date of birth: 2 June 1996 (age 30)
- Place of birth: Šabac, FR Yugoslavia
- Height: 1.83 m (6 ft 0 in)
- Position: Second striker

Team information
- Current team: SV Horn
- Number: 9

Youth career
- Brodarac

Senior career*
Years	Team	Apps	(Gls)
2015–2016	Jagodina	17	(0)
2016	→ Sloga Petrovac (loan)	5	(0)
2016–2017	Kolubara	9	(2)
2017	→ Brodarac 1947 (loan)	13	(6)
2017–2019	Proleter Novi Sad	11	(1)
2018	→ Sloboda Užice (loan)	15	(1)
2019	Žarkovo	8	(0)
2019	Zemun	3	(0)
2019–2020	Brodarac		
2021	Mačva Bogatić		
2021–2023	Wiener Viktoria	46	(14)
2024	FavAC	13	(2)
2024–2025	Marchfeld Donauauen	28	(13)
2025–	SV Horn	32	(18)
- * Club domestic league appearances and goals as of 27 June 2026

Zoran Mihailović (Serbian Cyrillic: Зоран Михаиловић; born 2 June 1996) is a Serbian football forward who plays for Austrian Regionalliga club SV Horn.

== Club career ==
On 11 July 2025, Mihailović joined SV Horn.
