= Imran Qurban =

Chinese footballer

Personal information
- Date of birth: 1 January 1999 (age 27)
- Height: 1.70 m (5 ft 7 in)
- Position: Defender

Youth career
- –2017: Guangzhou Evergrande
- 2017–2019: Mohelnice

Senior career*
Years	Team	Apps	(Gls)
2019	Sinđelić Beograd	6	(0)
- * Club domestic league appearances and goals as of 13:54, 31 December 2019 (UTC)

Imran Qurban (Chinese: 伊木然·库尔班; pinyin: Yīmùrán Kùěrbān; born 1 January 1999) is a Chinese footballer.

== Career statistics ==
=== Club ===
As of 31 December 2019.

Club	Season	League			Cup		Continental		Other		Total	
Club	Season	Division	Apps	Goals	Apps	Goals	Apps	Goals	Apps	Goals	Apps	Goals
Sinđelić Beograd	2018–19	Serbian First League	6	0	0	0	–		0	0	6	0
Career total			6	0	0	0	0	0	0	0	6	0
