= Vasilije Radenović =

Montenegrin footballer (born 1994)

Personal information
- Date of birth: 10 May 1994 (age 32)
- Place of birth: Podgorica, FR Yugoslavia
- Height: 1.88 m (6 ft 2 in)
- Position: Fullback

Youth career
- –2012: BSK Borča

Senior career*
| Years | Team | Apps | (Gls) |
| 2012–2013 | BSK Borča | | |
| 2013–2016 | Kolubara | | |
| 2016 | OFK Titograd | | |
| 2016–2017 | BSK Borča | 0 | (0) |
| 2017 | Lovćen | 2 | (0) |
| 2017 | Dečić | 0 | (0) |
| 2017–2019 | Proleter Novi Sad | 26 | (2) |
| 2019 | Žarkovo | 11 | (0) |
| 2019 | Brodarac | | |
| 2020 | Žarkovo | 4 | (0) |
| 2020–2021 | Lichtenauer FV | 10 | (2) |
| 2021 | Jagodina | 14 | (0) |
| 2021–2022 | Jezero | 33 | (2) |
| 2022–2023 | OFK Petrovac | 30 | (2) |
| 2023–2024 | GOŠK Gabela | 26 | (0) |
| 2024–2025 | Shamakhi | 24 | (0) |
| 2025 | Žalgiris | 11 | (0) |
| 2026 | Riteriai | 10 | (0) |
- * Club domestic league appearances and goals as of 19 June 2026

Vasilije Radenović (born 10 May 1994) is a Montenegrin footballer.

== Career ==
Radenović enjoyed a career year with Proleter Novi Sad during the 2017–18 season, registering three goals and eight assists through 25 appearances.

Upon returning to his native Montenegro with OFK Žarkovo in 2019, Radenović stated that the country had substantial footballing talent, but struggled with sporting infrastructure.

In January 2021, Radenović joined Serbian club Jagodina for the remainder of the 2020–21 season. He made his league debut for the club in February, in a 0–0 draw with former club Žarkovo.

In July 2021, he moved to FK Jezero. At the conclusion of the 2021–22 season, Radenović left the club and became a free agent.

In June 2022, Radenović joined OFK Petrovac. In an interview with news publication CDM, he stated that the club's goal was to qualify for European competition during the 2022–23 season.

On 22 June 2025 Žalgiris Club officially introduced player.
