= Danko Kiković =

Serbian footballer

Personal information
- Date of birth: 21 September 1994 (age 32)
- Place of birth: Belgrade, FR Yugoslavia
- Height: 1.87 m (6 ft 2 in)
- Position: Midfielder

Team information
- Current team: OFK Vršac
- Number: 8

Youth career
- 2013: Porto

Senior career*
Years	Team	Apps	(Gls)
2015–2016	BSK Borča	40	(4)
2017	Javor Ivanjica	14	(0)
2018	Mladost Lučani	5	(0)
2018	Inđija	20	(0)
2019–2020	Žarkovo	54	(10)
2021–2023	Novi Pazar	55	(3)
2023–2024	Kolubara	24	(1)
2024–	OFK Vršac	64	(4)
- * Club domestic league appearances and goals as of 14 May 2026

Danko Kiković (born 21 September 1994) is a Serbian footballer who plays as a midfielder for OFK Vršac.

== Career ==
In 2013, Kiković joined the youth academy of Porto, one of Portugal's most successful clubs.

In 2015, he signed for BSK Borča in the Serbian second division, where he made 40 league appearances and scored 4 goals, before joining Žarkovo.

Before the second half of the 2020–21 season, Kiković signed for Serbian top flight side Novi Pazar.

== Honours ==
Individual

- Serbian SuperLiga Player of the Week: 2020–21 (Round 28)
