= Ivan Marković (footballer, born 1991) =

Serbian footballer

Personal information
- Date of birth: 23 December 1991 (age 34)
- Place of birth: Belgrade, SFR Yugoslavia
- Height: 1.82 m (6 ft 0 in)
- Position: Striker

Team information
- Current team: Thrissur Magic

Senior career*
Years	Team	Apps	(Gls)
2009–2010	Čukarički	0	(0)
2010–2012	Železničar Lajkovac	57	(16)
2013	Banat Zrenjanin	16	(5)
2013	Gyeongnam	0	(0)
2013	→ Gimhae (loan)	10	(4)
2014–2015	Rad	17	(0)
2015–2016	Rudar Pljevlja	38	(11)
2017	Novi Pazar	16	(6)
2017–2018	Mladost Lučani	6	(0)
2018–2019	Javor Ivanjica	47	(31)
2019–2020	Mohammédia	10	(2)
2020	Inđija	3	(0)
2021	Zlatibor Čajetina	1	(0)
2021	Javor Ivanjica		
2022	Rad	15	(0)
2023	Hajduk 1912		
2024	Šušnjar		
2024	Radnički Valjevo		
2025–	Thrissur Magic		
- * Club domestic league appearances and goals as of 6 February 2021

Ivan Marković (Serbian Cyrillic: Иван Марковић; born 23 December 1991) is a Serbian football striker who plays for the Super League Kerala club Thrissur Magic.

== Professional career ==
In the winter's transfer window of 2017–18 season, Marković signed with Javor Ivanjica. In 2018–19 season, he was the 2018–19 Serbian First League top goalscorer, helping the club to gain promotion to the Serbian Superliga.

In September 2019, he signed a contract with the Moroccan club Mohammédia.
