= Vladimir Peralović =

Serbian footballer

Personal information
- Full name: Vladimir Peralović
- Date of birth: 10 October 1991 (age 35)
- Place of birth: Belgrade, SFR Yugoslavia
- Height: 1.81 m (5 ft 11 in)
- Position: Winger

Team information
- Current team: OFK Aranđelovac

Senior career*
Years	Team	Apps	(Gls)
2010–2012	Smederevo	4	(0)
2012–2013	Žarkovo	8	(1)
2013–2014	Zemun	21	(7)
2014–2015	Brodarac 1947	22	(4)
2015	IMT	14	(4)
2016–2017	Kolubara	43	(8)
2017–2018	Proleter Novi Sad	25	(5)
2018	Budućnost Dobanovci	18	(2)
2019	Sloboda Užice	11	(2)
2019-2020	IMT	15	(0)
2021	Brodarac		
2021-2023	Kačer Belanovica		
2024-	OFK Aranđelovac		
- * Club domestic league appearances and goals as of 15:09, 24 May 2019 (UTC)

Vladimir Peralović (Serbian Cyrillic: Владимир Пераловић; born 10 October 1991) is a Serbian football winger who plays for OFK Aranđelovac.
