= Nassor Hamoud =

Tanzanian footballer

Personal information
- Full name: Nassor Saadun Hamoud
- Date of birth: 23 March 2001 (age 25)
- Place of birth: Temeke District, Dar es Salaam; Tanzania
- Position: Midfielder

Team information
- Current team: Šumadija Aranđelovac

Senior career*
Years	Team	Apps	(Gls)
2017	Kagera Sugar		
2018–2019	Tersana		
2020	Žarkovo	2	(0)
2020–	Šumadija Aranđelovac		
2021	→ Vyškov (loan)		

International career^{‡}
2021	Tanzania U20	3	(0)
- * Club domestic league appearances and goals ‡ National team caps and goals as of 14:19, 14 July 2021 (UTC)

Nassor Saadun Hamoud (born 23 March 2001), commonly known as Nassor Hamoud, is a Tanzanian footballer who plays for Azam Football Club in Tanzania PremierLeague .

== Club career ==
In his native Tanzania Hamoud played for Kagera Sugar of the Tanzanian Premier League. From 2018 to 2020 he played for Tersana SC of the Egyptian Second Division. In February 2020 he made the jump to Europe and signed for OFK Žarkovo of the Serbian First League for the 2019–20 season on a two-year contract. In total, he made two league appearances for the club with his debut coming on 30 May 2020 against FK Zlatibor Čajetina. He then switched to FK Šumadija Aranđelovac before being loaned out to MFK Vyškov in 2021.

== International career ==
Hamoud was named to Tanzania's squad for the 2021 Africa U-20 Cup of Nations and appeared in all three of the team's matches. In March 2021 Hamoud was named as one of the few foreign-based players on Kim Poulsen's provisional roster for two senior friendlies against Kenya. In May the same year, he was again included in the provisional squad for a friendly against Malawi but did not make the final roster.
