= Miloš Čudić =

Serbian footballer

Personal information
- Date of birth: 21 August 1996 (age 30)
- Place of birth: Banja Luka, Bosnia and Herzegovina
- Height: 1.73 m (5 ft 8 in)
- Position: Midfielder

Youth career
- Rad

Senior career*
Years	Team	Apps	(Gls)
2014–2015	Rad	2	(0)
2015–2016	Žarkovo	25	(3)
2017	Zemun	1	(0)
2017–2019	Borac Banja Luka	29	(0)
2019–2020	Žarkovo	28	(3)
2021	Tekstilac Derventa		
2022–2023	Ljubić Prnjavor		

International career
2014–2015	Serbia U19	3	(0)
- * Club domestic league appearances and goals as of 11:23, 22 May 2019 (UTC)

Miloš Čudić (Serbian Cyrillic: Милош Чудић; born 21 August 1996) is a Serbian professional footballer who plays as a midfielder.

== Club career ==
Čudić played for the FK Rad main team from the 2014–15 season. After he spent a period between 2015 and 2016 with satellite club Žarkovo, he decided to leave the club at the beginning of 2017. He joined Zemun shortly after.

== International career ==
Having been born in Banja Luka, Republika Srpska, Bosnia and Herzegovina, he has been playing for the Serbian U-19 team.

He was part of the Republika Srpska U-18 team in September 2013.
