= Ivan Kričak =

Serbian footballer

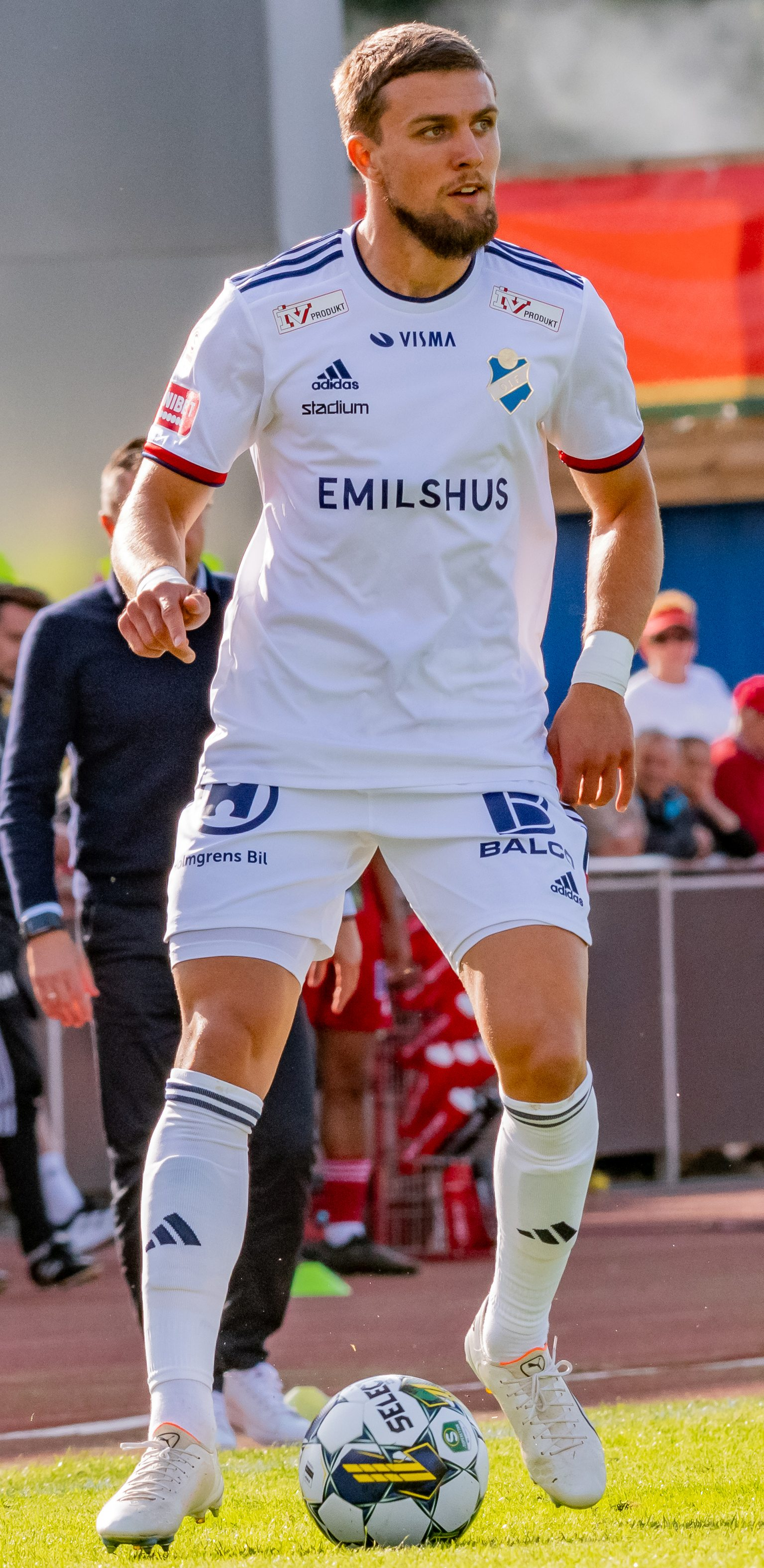

Personal information
- Date of birth: 19 July 1996 (age 30)
- Place of birth: Belgrade, FR Yugoslavia
- Height: 1.82 m (6 ft 0 in)
- Positions: Centre-back; right-back

Team information
- Current team: Hapoel Haifa
- Number: 5

Youth career
- Partizan
- Rad

Senior career*
Years	Team	Apps	(Gls)
2015–2017	Rad	1	(0)
2016	→ OFK Žarkovo (loan)		
2017–2019	Sinđelić Beograd	56	(0)
2019–2021	Radnik Surdulica	60	(2)
2021–2023	Mjällby	58	(2)
2023–2025	Öster	61	(6)
2026–	Hapoel Haifa	14	(0)
- * Club domestic league appearances and goals as of 24 June 2026

Ivan Kričak (Serbian Cyrillic: Иван Кричак; born 19 July 1996) is a Serbian professional footballer who plays as a defender for Hapoel Haifa in the Israeli Premier League.

== Career ==
=== Rad ===
Kričak was a member of generation which won the Serbian youth league 2015, and promoted in 2015–16 UEFA Youth League. Previously, he was a member of FK Partizan youth school. He made his SuperLiga debut against in the 13th fixture of 2015–16 season, on 14 October 2015.
