= Michel Vaillant Mbiobe Mouegni =

Cameroonian footballer (born 1996)

Michel Vaillant
Personal information
- Full name: Michel Vaillant Mbiobe Mouegni
- Date of birth: 3 February 1996 (age 30)
- Place of birth: Yaoundé, Cameroon
- Height: 1.90 m (6 ft 3 in)
- Position: Forward

Youth career
- AS Green City
- 2014–2015: Napredak Kruševac

Senior career*
Years	Team	Apps	(Gls)
2014–2016	Napredak Kruševac	0	(0)
2015–2016	→ Mladost Lučani (loan)	21	(2)
2016–2019	Mladost Lučani	3	(0)
2018–2019	→ Trayal (loan)	16	(2)
2019	Bylis	3	(0)
2020–2021	Budućnost Dobanovci	14	(0)

International career
2016–2017	Cameroon U23	4	(0)
- * Club domestic league appearances and goals as of 19 May 2021

Michel Vaillant Mbiobe Mouegni (3 February 1996) is a Cameroonian footballer, who plays as a forward.

== Club career ==
Born in Yaoundé, Vaillant joined Napredak Kruševac in summer 2015. He used to play for AS Green City. For the season 2014–15, he was with the first team, but also played for Napredak's youth team. After the end of his youth career, he was with Napredak's reserves and was once time in protocol for the Serbian First League. Later, the player was loaned to Mladost Lučani.

After he did not get a real chance for playing at Napredak, Vaillant moved to Mladost Lučani in September 2015. He made his Serbian SuperLiga debut on 19 September 2015 in the 10th fixture of the 2015–16 season against Voždovac, under coach Nenad Milovanović. After a season playing with Mladost Lučani as a loaned player, he signed a one-year contract with the club.

In summer 2018, Vaillant returned to Kruševac and joined newly promoted Serbian First League side Trayal, on six-month loan deal. He made his debut for the club on 29 August 2018, replacing Uroš Vesić in 1–1 draw to Zlatibor Čajetina.

== International career ==
In October 2016, Vaillant received a call for the Cameroon national under-23 football team for a game played on October 6 against Morocco U23.

In August 2017, Vaillant was part of the Cameroon U23 team playing at the 2017 Islamic Solidarity Games held in Baku, Azerbaijan. There he played along his older brother, Macky Bagnack who is a defender.

== Career statistics ==
=== Club ===
As of 29 August 2018

Appearances and goals by club, season and competition
Club	Season	League			Cup		Continental		Other		Total	
Club	Season	Division	Apps	Goals	Apps	Goals	Apps	Goals	Apps	Goals	Apps	Goals
Napredak Kruševac	2014–15	SuperLiga	0	0	0	0	—		0	0	0	0
Napredak Kruševac	2015–16	First League	0	0	0	0	—		—		0	0
Napredak Kruševac	Total		0	0	0	0	—		0	0	0	0
Mladost Lučani	2015–16 (loan)	SuperLiga	21	2	1	0	—		—		22	2
Mladost Lučani	2016–17	SuperLiga	3	0	1	0	—		—		4	0
Mladost Lučani	2017–18	SuperLiga	0	0	0	0	0	0	—		0	0
Mladost Lučani	Total		24	2	2	0	0	0	—		26	1
Trayal (loan)	2018–19	First League	1	0	0	0	—		—		1	0
Career total			25	2	2	0	0	0	0	0	27	2
