= Tamás Hajagos =

Serbian footballer (born 1996)

Personal information
- Date of birth: 10 May 1996 (age 30)
- Place of birth: Vrbas, Serbia
- Height: 1.81 m (5 ft 11 in)
- Position: Goalkeeper

Team information
- Current team: III. Kerületi TVE

Senior career*
Years	Team	Apps	(Gls)
2015	Szeged-Csanád	9	(0)
2016–2018	TSC		
2019–2022	Szentlőrinci SE	62	(0)
2022	Nagykanizsa FC	18	(0)
2023–	III. Kerületi TVE	19	(0)

International career
- Délvidék
- * Club domestic league appearances and goals

Tamás Hajagos (born 10 May 1996) is a footballer who plays as a goalkeeper for III. Kerületi TVE.

== Early life ==
Hajagos is a native of Vojvodina, Serbia. He played as a field player for five years before becoming a goalkeeper. He grew up supporting idolizing Spain international Pepe Reina.

== Club career ==
In 2019, he signed for Hungarian side Szentlőrinci SE, where he was regarded as an important played for the club. He then helped the club avoid relegation the first season after promotion, keeping ten clean sheets during the season. In 2022, he signed for Hungarian side Nagykanizsa FC, where he alternated matches with Hungarian goalkeeper Bence Borsi. In 2023, he signed for Hungarian side III. Kerületi TVE.

== International career ==
Hajagos played for the Délvidék football team during the 2018 CONIFA World Football Cup qualification.

== Style of play ==
Hajagos mainly operates as a goalkeeper and is known for his leadership.

== Personal life ==
Hajagos has been a supporter of English Premier League side Liverpool.
