= Mladen Živković =

Serbian footballer

Personal information
- Date of birth: 26 August 1989 (age 37)
- Place of birth: Požarevac, SFR Yugoslavia
- Height: 1.88 m (6 ft 2 in)
- Position: Goalkeeper

Team information
- Current team: Zemun
- Number: 89

Youth career
- Carevac
- VGSK

Senior career*
| Years | Team | Apps | (Gls) |
| 2007–2009 | INON | 42 | (0) |
| 2009–2010 | Sloga 33 | 25 | (0) |
| 2010–2013 | Smederevo | 35 | (0) |
| 2013 | Donji Srem | 0 | (0) |
| 2014 | Chernomorets Burgas | 13 | (0) |
| 2014 | Sinđelić Beograd | 6 | (0) |
| 2015–2017 | Novi Pazar | 31 | (0) |
| 2017–2018 | Radnički Niš | 30 | (0) |
| 2019 | Mjøndalen | 0 | (0) |
| 2019 | Rad | 1 | (0) |
| 2019 | Mladost Lučani | 4 | (0) |
| 2020 | Mačva Šabac | 7 | (0) |
| 2020–2021 | Napredak Kruševac | 2 | (0) |
| 2021–2023 | Železničar Pančevo | 72 | (0) |
| 2024–2025 | Mladost Novi Sad | 17 | (0) |
| 2025– | Zemun | 35 | (0) |
- * Club domestic league appearances and goals as of 14 May 2026

Mladen Živković (Serbian Cyrillic: Младен Живковић; born 26 August 1989) is a Serbian professional footballer who plays as a goalkeeper for Zemun.

== Career ==
On 16 January 2019, Živković moved to Norway and joined Mjøndalen IF on a 6-month contract to replace Sosha Makani, who was injured. Only 9 days later, he left the club by mutual consent and moved back to Serbia for personal reasons. On 30 January, he then joined FK Rad.
