= Milija Žižić =

Serbian football manager and player

Personal information
- Full name: Milija Žižić
- Date of birth: 28 February 1979 (age 47)
- Place of birth: Sarajevo, SFR Yugoslavia
- Height: 1.93 m (6 ft 4 in)
- Position: Defender

Team information
- Current team: AEK Athens (assistant manager)

Senior career*
Years	Team	Apps	(Gls)
1999–2000	Mogren		(1)
2002–2003	Javor Ivanjica	1	(0)
2005–2006	Posavac	17	(4)
2006–2007	ČSK Čelarevo	3	(0)
2007–2008	Kitchee	5	(1)
2008–2009	Gabala	15	(0)
2009–2010	Grafičar Beograd	5	(1)

Managerial career
- Rad (youth)
- 2015–2016: Žarkovo
- 2017: Bežanija
- 2018–2020: Grafičar Beograd
- 2021–2022: Metalac Gornji Milanovac
- * Club domestic league appearances and goals

Milija Žižić (Serbian Cyrillic: Милија Жижић; born 28 February 1979) is a Serbian football manager and former player. He is an assistant manager for Greek Super League club AEK Athens.

== Playing career ==
During his playing career, Žižić played for Mogren and Javor Ivanjica in the First League of FR Yugoslavia. He also played professionally in Hong Kong and Azerbaijan.

== Managerial career ==
On 29 November 2021, Žižić was appointed as manager of Serbian SuperLiga club Metalac Gornji Milanovac.
