= Miroslav Orlić =

Austrian association football player (1993-)

Personal information
- Date of birth: 13 January 1993 (age 33)
- Place of birth: Austria
- Height: 1.90 m (6 ft 3 in)
- Position: Goalkeeper

Senior career*
Years	Team	Apps	(Gls)
2009	USV Eggelsberg/Moosdorf	12	(0)
2009-2010	Union Henndorf	12	(0)
2009	→ Union Henndorf II (loan)	3	(0)
2010-2013	TSV St. Johann	7	(0)
2013-2014	SV Wals-Grünau	13	(0)
2014	Seekirchen	0	(0)
2014	→ SV Seekirchen II (loan)	1	(0)
- Zvijezda 09
-2017	ENAD		
2017-2018	Omonia Aradippou	19	(0)
2018-2019	UTA Arad	16	(0)
2019	OFK Petrovac	6	(0)
2020	Dinamo Vranje	9	(0)
- * Club domestic league appearances and goals

Miroslav Orlić (born 13 January 1993) is an Austrian footballer who is last known to have played as a goalkeeper for FK Dinamo Vranje.

== Career ==
In 2009, Orlić signed for Austrian fifth division side Union Henndorf after playing for USV Eggelsberg/Moosdorf in the Austrian sixth division.

In 2010, he signed for Austrian third division club TSV St. Johann. After that, he signed for Zvijezda 09 in the Bosnian second division.

In 2017, Orlić signed for Cypriot team Omonia Aradippou.

In 2018, he signed for UTA in Romania, where he received an offer from Kuwait.

In 2019, Orlić signed for Montenegrin outfit OFK Petrovac.

In 2020, Orlić signed for Dinamo Vranje in the Serbian second division, where he made 10 appearances and scored 0 goals and was accused of match-fixing after throwing the ball into his own goal during a 3–1 win against Železničar (Pančevo).
