= Lazar Milutinović =

Serbian footballer

Personal information
- Date of birth: 20 September 1998 (age 28)
- Place of birth: Kragujevac, Serbia
- Height: 1.78 m (5 ft 10 in)
- Position: Forward

Youth career
- Radnički Kragujevac

Senior career*
Years	Team	Apps	(Gls)
2015	Radnički Kragujevac	1	(0)
2015–2019	Lokomotiva Beograd		
2019	Inđija		
2019	→ Grafičar Beograd (loan)		
2019–2020	Lokomotiva Beograd		
2020–2022	Feniks 1995		
2022	Spartak Subotica	0	(0)
- * Club domestic league appearances and goals as of 18 May 2015

Lazar Milutinović (Serbian Cyrillic: Лазар Милутиновић; born 20 September 1998) is a Serbian football forward who most recently played for FK Spartak Subotica.

== Career ==
He made his SuperLiga debut on 16 May 2015, in the 29th fixture of the 2014–15 season, against Jagodina.

In January 2022, Milutinović joined FK Spartak Subotica on a three-year deal.

== Career statistics ==
As of 18 May 2015

Club performance			League		Cup		Continental		Total	
Season	Club	League	Apps	Goals	Apps	Goals	Apps	Goals	Apps	Goals
Serbia			League		Serbian Cup		Europe		Total	
2014–15	Radnički 1923	SuperLiga	1	0	0	0	0	0	1	0
Total	Serbia		1	0	0	0	0	0	1	0
Career total			1	0	0	0	0	0	1	0
