= Seydou Bocar Seck =

Senegalese footballer (born 1991)

Personal information
- Date of birth: 8 February 1991 (age 35)
- Place of birth: Ziguinchor, Senegal
- Height: 1.85 m (6 ft 1 in)
- Position: Defender

Youth career
- Diambars FC

Senior career*
| Years | Team | Apps | (Gls) |
| 2008–2011 | Bordeaux | 0 | (0) |
| 2008–2011 | → Bordeaux B | | |
| 2011–2014 | Diambars FC | | |
| 2015 | Bærum | 9 | (0) |
| 2016 | Kristiansund | 10 | (0) |
| 2016 | Ljungskile | 0 | (0) |
| 2019 | Dinamo Vranje | 6 | (0) |
- * Club domestic league appearances and goals

Seydou Bocar Seck (born 8 February 1991) is a Senegalese former professional footballer who played as a defender.

== Career ==
By the age of 15 he was 1.81 m in height and playing with Diambars FC, a club where his father, Saër Seck, is president. His position was defender although coaches would also crop him to play as defensive midfielder. By then his dream was to play for Bordeaux and then for Chelsea F.C. His dream to play with Bordeaux was partially realised in 2008.

He arrived in France when he was 17 and signed with Bordeaux when the 2008–09 season already started. After a few trainings with the first-team, the club decided he would play with reserves squad in the Championnat de France Amateur rather than being part of the U-18 team. However, problems with the international transfer certificate resulted in Bocar starting to play only by the end of the season. That season Bordeaux won the French championship and Bocar had the chance to play with the first-team in a friendly game by the end of the season. Afterwards, Bocar had problems with injuries that resulted in him leaving Bordeaux and France.

He played in Senegal again with Diambars FC until he left the club at the end of the 2013–14 season when in May Norwegian side Tromsø IL intended to sign him; however, in June the deal was canceled. Bocar made a break in his career and moved to London where he spent a year resuming his bachelor's degree in Business Management. In the spring of 2015 he started recovering his physical condition and the following summer he moved to Norway where he continued his studies and also his football career by signing with Bærum SK. With Bærum he played in the 2015 Norwegian First Division. At the end of the season Bærum was relegated and Bocar moved to Kristiansund BK playing with them in the first half of the 2016 Norwegian First Division.

In summer 2016 Bocar moved to Sweden and signed with Ljungskile SK, however he was only an unused substitute during August and September in club games in the 2016 Superettan. Bocar left Ljungskile which was facing difficulties at that time and ended that season relegated. At the end of 2016 Bocar received the news that Kristiansund BK where he played the first half of the season, became champions and won promotion to the Eliteserien.

After a new career-break, Bocar decided to return to professional football, and during the winter-break of the 2018–19 Serbian SuperLiga, he signed with Serbian side Dinamo Vranje. He made 3 appearances in the league, however, by the end of the season. Dinamo was relegated. Seck stayed in the club and made his debut in the 2019–20 Serbian First League on 4 August 2019, in a home win against FK Smederevo by 3–1.

== Personal life ==
Seydou Bocar Seck's father, Saër Seck, is the president of Senegalese top-flight club Diambars FC and also the president of the Senegalese Ligue Professionelle.

== Honours ==
Diambars

- Senegal Premier League: 2013

Kristiansund

- Norwegian First Division: 2016
