= Marko Vučetić =

Serbian footballer

Personal information
- Full name: Marko Vučetić
- Date of birth: 24 June 1986 (age 40)
- Place of birth: Belgrade, SFR Yugoslavia
- Height: 1.80 m (5 ft 11 in)
- Position: Central midfielder

Team information
- Current team: Šumadija 1962 Jagnjilo

Senior career*
Years	Team	Apps	(Gls)
2004–2005	→ Dorćol (loan)	29	(2)
2005–2006	Radnički Beograd	30	(2)
2006–2007	Železničar Beograd	26	(4)
2007–2009	Big Bull Bačinci	66	(10)
2010–2011	Inđija	38	(5)
2011–2013	Bregalnica Štip	59	(6)
2013	Ekranas	5	(1)
2013–2014	Adanaspor	28	(2)
2015	Napredak Kruševac	12	(0)
2015	Inđija	12	(3)
2016	Radnik Surdulica	3	(0)
2016	Bežanija	12	(3)
2017	Bregalnica Štip	18	(0)
2017–2018	Novi Pazar	23	(1)
2018	Sloboda Užice	4	(0)
2019	Bežanija	11	(1)
2019–2022	Kolubara	15	(0)
2022–2023	Omladinac Novi Banovci		
2023–2024	Brodarac		
2025–	Ljukovo		
2025–	Šumadija 1962 Jagnjilo		
- * Club domestic league appearances and goals as of 00:28, 30 November 2019 (UTC)

Marko Vučetić (Serbian Cyrillic: Марко Вучетић; born 24 June 1986) is a Serbian football midfielder who plays for Šumadija 1962 Jagnjilo.
