= Marko Čubrilo =

Bosnian footballer

Personal information
- Date of birth: 3 May 1992 (age 34)
- Place of birth: Novi Sad, FR Yugoslavia
- Height: 1.73 m (5 ft 8 in)
- Position: Left-back

Youth career
- –2016: Partizan

Senior career*
| Years | Team | Apps | (Gls) |
| 2016–2017 | Partizan | 0 | (0) |
| 2017 | → Teleoptik (loan) | 8 | (1) |
| 2018–2019 | Radnik Surdulica | 16 | (0) |
| 2019 | Domžale | 0 | (0) |
| 2019–2020 | Žarkovo | 6 | (0) |
| 2020 | Budućnost Dobanovci | 6 | (0) |
| 2020–2021 | Dinamo Vranje | 26 | (0) |
| 2021–2022 | Mladost Novi Sad | 4 | (0) |
| 2022–2023 | Leotar | 42 | (0) |
| 2023–2024 | Igman Konjic | 30 | (1) |
| 2024–2025 | Zalaegerszeg | 1 | (0) |
| 2025–2026 | Radnik Bijeljina | 20 | (0) |

International career
| 2016 | Bosnia and Herzegovina U19 | 6 | (0) |
- * Club domestic league appearances and goals as of 12 June 2026

Marko Čubrilo (Serbian Cyrillic: Марко Чубрило; born 3 May 1998) is a Bosnian footballer.

== Club career ==
Born in Novi Sad, Čubrilo came through FK Partizan academy where he played in the youth team and then in Partizan's satellite team FK Teleoptik. With Teleoptik he played in the 2016–17 Serbian League Belgrade and next in the first half of the 2017–18 Serbian First League. During winter-break of the 2017–18 season he signed with FK Radnik Surdulica.

== International career ==
Despite having been born in Novi Sad, Serbia, he decided to represent Bosnia and Herzegovina internationally having debuted for their under 19 team in 2016.
