= Nikola Dimitrijević =

Serbian footballer

Personal information
- Full name: Nikola Dimitrijević
- Date of birth: 10 May 1991 (age 35)
- Place of birth: Belgrade, SFR Yugoslavia
- Height: 1.81 m (5 ft 11 in)
- Position: Right wing-back

Team information
- Current team: Smederevo 1924
- Number: 10

Senior career*
Years	Team	Apps	(Gls)
2007–2009	Obilić	4	(0)
2008–2009	→ Voždovac (loan)	1	(0)
2009–2010	Voždovac	23	(2)
2010–2012	PKB Padinska Skela	23	(0)
2012	Srem	23	(3)
2013	Smederevo 1924	1	(0)
2013	Spartak Bánovce	1	(0)
2014–2015	Zemun	40	(8)
2015–2016	Metalac Gornji Milanovac	29	(3)
2016	Novi Pazar	18	(2)
2017	Rad	8	(0)
2017	Radnik Surdulica	0	(0)
2017	Budućnost Dobanovci	10	(2)
2018	Bačka Palanka	13	(1)
2018	Zlaté Moravce	14	(1)
2019–2020	Inđija	43	(1)
2021–2022	Javor Ivanjica	37	(1)
2022–	Smederevo 1924	33	(5)
- * Club domestic league appearances and goals as of 21 June 2024

Nikola Dimitrijević (Serbian Cyrillic: Никола Димитријевић; born 10 May 1991) is a Serbian footballer who plays for Smederevo 1924.

== Club career ==
Dimitrijević started his career at Obilić, and later played for Voždovac, PKB Padinska Skela, Srem, Smederevo, Spartak Bánovce and Zemun. He signed a two-year contract with Metalac Gornji Milanovac in summer 2015. After a season with Metalac, Dimitrijević joined Novi Pazar in summer 2016. He also played with Rad in early 2017.

== Career statistics ==
As of 22 June 2017

Club performance			League		Cup		Continental		Total	
Season	Club	League	Apps	Goals	Apps	Goals	Apps	Goals	Apps	Goals
2007–08	Obilić	Serbian League Belgrade	4	0	—		—		4	0
2008–09	Voždovac	Serbian First League	1	0	—		—		1	0
2009–10	Voždovac	Serbian League Belgrade	23	2	—		—		23	2
2011–12	PKB Padinska Skela	Serbian League Belgrade	23	2	—		—		23	2
2012–13	Srem	Serbian League Vojvodina	23	3	—		—		23	3
2013–14	Smederevo	Serbian First League	1	0	—		—		1	0
2013–14	Spartak Bánovce	4. Liga	1	0	—		—		1	0
2013–14	Zemun	Serbian League Belgrade	14	1	—		—		14	1
2014–15	Zemun	Serbian League Belgrade	26	7	—		—		26	7
2015–16	Metalac Gornji Milanovac	Serbian SuperLiga	29	3	0	0	—		29	3
2016–17	Novi Pazar	Serbian SuperLiga	18	2	1	0	—		19	2
2016–17	Rad	Serbian SuperLiga	8	0	—		—		8	0
Career total			171	17	1	0	—		172	17

== Honours ==
PKB Padinska Skela

- Belgrade Zone League: 2010–11

Zemun

- Serbian League Belgrade: 2014–15
