= Luka Cvetićanin =

Serbian association football player

Personal information
- Date of birth: 11 February 2003 (age 23)
- Place of birth: Zrenjanin, Serbia and Montenegro
- Height: 1.86 m (6 ft 1 in)
- Position: Forward

Team information
- Current team: Radnik Bijeljina
- Number: 17

Youth career
- –2019: Partizan
- 2018: → Teleoptik (loan)

Senior career*
Years	Team	Apps	(Gls)
2019–2021	Voždovac	43	(1)
2021–2023	Cádiz B	33	(1)
2021–2022	→ San Fernando (loan)	9	(2)
2023–2024	Kolubara	22	(1)
2024–2025	Sloboda Užice	18	(5)
2025	Zemun	16	(1)
2026	Zvijezda 09	13	(2)
2026–	Radnik Bijeljina	7	(0)

International career
2018–2019	Serbia U16	6	(2)
2018–2019	Serbia U17	11	(0)
- * Club domestic league appearances and goals as of 17 October 2026

Luka Cvetićanin (Serbian Cyrillic: Лука Цветићанин; born 11 February 2003) is a Serbian footballer who currently plays as a forward for Bosnian Premier League club Radnik Bijeljina. He was included in The Guardian's Next Generation 2020.

== Club career ==
On 18 August 2021, Cvetićanin joined Segunda División RFEF side Cádiz B from Voždovac on a five-year contract, and was immediately loaned to Primera División RFEF side San Fernando CD.

== Career statistics ==
As of match played 27 October 2026

Appearances and goals by club, season and competition
Club	Season	League			National cup (Note: Includes Serbian Cup, Copa del Rey, Bosnian Cup)		Total	
Club	Season	Division	Apps	Goals	Apps	Goals	Apps	Goals
Voždovac	2019–20	Serbian SuperLiga	13	0	1	0	14	0
Voždovac	2020–21	Serbian SuperLiga	29	1	3	0	32	1
Voždovac	2021–22	Serbian SuperLiga	1	0	—		1	0
Voždovac	Total		43	1	4	0	47	1
Cádiz B	2021–22	Segunda División RFEF	16	1	—		16	1
Cádiz B	2022–23	Segunda Federación	17	0	—		17	0
Cádiz B	Total		33	1	—		33	1
San Fernando (loan)	2021–22	Primera División RFEF	9	2	1	0	10	2
Kolubara	2023–24	Serbian First League	22	1	1	0	23	1
Sloboda Užice	2024–25	Serbian First League	18	5	1	0	19	5
Zemun	2024–25	Serbian First League	16	1	—		16	1
Zvijezda 09	2025–26	First League of RS	13	2	—		13	2
Radnik Bijeljina	2026–27	Bosnian Premier League	7	0	1	0	8	0
Career total			161	13	8	0	169	13
