= Nikola Tripković =

Serbian footballer

Personal information
- Date of birth: 28 January 1998 (age 28)
- Place of birth: Čačak, FR Yugoslavia
- Height: 1.84 m (6 ft 0 in)
- Position: Forward

Team information
- Current team: Polet Ljubić

Youth career
- –2017: Borac Čačak

Senior career*
Years	Team	Apps	(Gls)
2017–2019	Borac Čačak	25	(10)
2018	→ Polet Ljubić (loan)	14	(8)
2019–2021	Spartak Subotica	6	(0)
2020	→ Smederevo (loan)	7	(2)
2020	→ Inđija (loan)	7	(0)
2021	Lori	5	(1)
2021–2022	Budućnost Dobanovci	35	(10)
2023	Zlatibor Čajetina	9	(1)
2023	Radnički Sremska Mitrovica		
2024-	Polet Ljubić		
- * Club domestic league appearances and goals as of 20:50, 8 July 2023 (UTC)

Nikola Tripković (born 28 January 1998) is a Serbian football striker who plays for Polet Ljubić.

== Club career ==
He made his Serbian Super Liga debut with FK Borac Čačak in July 2017.
