= 2018–19 Serbian First League =

Serbian First League
- Season: 2018–19
- Champions: TSC
- Promoted: TSC; Javor; Inđija
- Relegated: Bečej; Novi Pazar; Teleoptik; Sloboda
- Matches: 296
- Goals: 705 (2.38 per match)
- Top goalscorer: Ivan Marković (29)
- Biggest home win: Metalac 7–0 Sloboda
- Biggest away win: Novi Pazar 0–5 Radnički
- Highest scoring: Javor 6–3 Novi Pazar
- Longest winning run: TSC 13 games
- Longest unbeaten run: TSC 31 games
- Longest winless run: Novi Pazar 23 games
- Longest losing run: Sloboda 8 games

The Serbian First League (Serbian: Prva liga Srbije) is the second-highest football league in Serbia. The league is operated by the Serbian FA. 16 teams compete in the league for the 2018–19 season.

== Format 2018–19 ==
As of the 2018-19 season, the league reverted to its previous playoff system, whereby the top 8 placed teams compete in the promoted round at the end of the season and the 8 lowest placed teams play in the relegation playoff round. The four bottom placed teams are relegated to the Serbian League. The Fourteenth team from Super League is then sent to a playoff against the winner of the First League play off. At the end of the season, the top two teams and the winner of the play-offs are promoted to the Super League. The First League play-offs is a knock-out competition for the teams finishing the season in third to sixth place with the winner being promoted to the Super League. In the play-offs, the third-placed team plays against the sixth-placed team and the fourth-placed team plays against the fifth-placed team.

== Team changes ==
The following teams have changed division since the 2017–18 season.

=== To First League ===
Promoted from Serbian League

- Žarkovo
- Trayal Kruševac
- Bečej
- Zlatibor

Relegated from Serbian SuperLiga

- Borac Čačak
- Javor

=== From First League ===
Relegated to Serbian League

- ČSK
- Jagodina
- Radnički Pirot
- Temnić 1924

Promoted to Serbian SuperLiga

- Dinamo Vranje
- Proleter Novi Sad

== 2018–19 teams ==
Location of teams in the 2018–19 Serbian First League

Team	City	Stadium	Capacity	Kit manufacturer	Shirt Sponsor
Bečej	Bečej	Gradski stadion kraj Tise	1,296	NAAI	Gebrüder Weiss
Bežanija	Belgrade	Stadion FK Bežanija	4,000	Macron	BIOeliksir
Borac	Čačak	Čačak Stadium	8,000	NAAI	Škoda Auto
Budućnost Dobanovci	Belgrade	Stadion FK Budućnost	1,000	Legea	
Inđija	Inđija	Stadion FK Inđija	4,500	NAAI	ZUTI Market
Javor	Ivanjica	Javor Stadium	4,000	Miteks	Matis
Metalac	Gornji Milanovac	Stadion Metalac	4,400	NAAI	Metalac a.d.
Novi Pazar	Novi Pazar	Novi Pazar City Stadium	13,000	Givova	
Radnički 1923	Kragujevac	Čika Dača Stadium	15,100	NAAI	Grad Kragujevac
Sinđelić	Belgrade	Stadion FK Sinđelić	1,500	NAAI	AMS Osiguranje
Sloboda	Užice	Užice City Stadium	12,000	NAAI	UNITRAG
Teleoptik	Zemun	SC Partizan-Teleoptik	5,000	Nike	
Trayal	Kruševac	Stadion FK Trayal	1,500	Hummel	Trayal Corporation
TSC	Bačka Topola	Bačka Topola City Stadium	5,000	Adidas	SAT-TRAKT Communications
Žarkovo	Belgrade	Stadion FK Žarkovo	610	NAAI	Rubikon Shipping Company
Zlatibor	Čajetina	Stadion Švajcarija	1,040	Ardu Sport	Galens Invest

== Transfers ==
For the list of transfers involving First League clubs during 2018–19 season, please see: List of Serbian football transfers summer 2018 and List of Serbian football transfers winter 2018–19.

== Regular season ==
=== League table ===
Pos	Team	Pld	W	D	L	GF	GA	GD	Pts	Qualification
1	TSC	30	20	8	2	64	19	+45	68	Qualification for the Championship round
2	Javor Matis	30	19	6	5	61	27	+34	63	Qualification for the Championship round
3	Inđija	30	17	6	7	48	21	+27	57	Qualification for the Championship round
4	Zlatibor	30	16	2	12	41	30	+11	50	Qualification for the Championship round
5	Radnički 1923	30	14	7	9	36	32	+4	49	Qualification for the Championship round
6	Metalac Gornji Milanovac	30	13	9	8	45	32	+13	48	Qualification for the Championship round
7	Bežanija	30	14	3	13	40	38	+2	45	Qualification for the Championship round
8	Sinđelić	30	11	11	8	28	24	+4	44	Qualification for the Championship round
9	Žarkovo	30	11	8	11	37	38	−1	41	Qualification for the Relegation round
10	Trayal Kruševac	30	12	5	13	27	32	−5	41	Qualification for the Relegation round
11	Bečej	30	10	6	14	33	37	−4	36	Qualification for the Relegation round
12	Budućnost Dobanovci	30	8	9	13	26	35	−9	33	Qualification for the Relegation round
13	Teleoptik	30	6	9	15	26	44	−18	27	Qualification for the Relegation round
14	Borac Čačak	30	6	7	17	23	44	−21	25	Qualification for the Relegation round
15	Sloboda Užice	30	5	6	19	16	56	−40	21	Qualification for the Relegation round
16	Novi Pazar	30	3	8	19	13	55	−42	17	Qualification for the Relegation round

Source: Prva Liga (in Serbian), Soccerway
Rules for classification: 1) Points; 2) Head-to-head points; 3) Head-to-head goal difference; 4) Head-to-head goals scored; 5) Head-to-head away goals scored (if two teams tied); 6) Goal difference; 7) Goals scored; 8) Fair play ranking; 9) Draw.

=== Results ===
Home \ Away	BEČ	BEŽ	BOR	BDO	INĐ	JAV	MET	NPZ	RDK	SIN	SLO	TLO	TRA	TSC	ŽAR	ZLA
Bečej		1–2	0–0	5–1	1–0	1–3	1–1	3–0	1–2	0–1	3–0	1–0	1–0	0–0	1–5	0–2
Bežanija	1–0		1–2	2–0	0–1	1–2	1–1	2–0	0–1	3–0	4–1	1–0	2–0	0–1	3–2	1–3
Borac Čačak	1–1	0–3		1–2	0–4	1–1	0–1	1–0	1–0	1–1	0–1	3–0	0–1	0–3	3–1	2–0
Budućnost Dobanovci	0–1	3–0	1–1		0–1	0–0	2–1	3–0	0–1	1–1	2–0	1–1	0–1	0–3	1–1	1–0
Inđija	3–1	2–0	2–0	2–2		1–1	0–0	5–0	3–1	0–0	3–0	1–0	1–2	4–0	2–1	2–0
Javor Matis	1–2	4–1	4–0	1–0	1–0		1–1	6–3	4–0	1–0	2–0	1–0	1–0	2–2	7–1	2–1
Metalac Gornji Milanovac	2–0	1–1	2–1	2–1	2–2	4–1		2–1	1–2	1–0	7–0	1–1	3–1	2–5	0–0	2–0
Novi Pazar	0–4	2–2	0–0	1–2	0–1	0–3	2–0		0–5	0–1	0–0	0–1	1–0	0–1	1–1	1–0
Radnički 1923	2–0	1–0	1–0	1–0	0–1	1–1	2–1	1–1		1–1	2–0	2–2	3–1	2–2	1–1	0–2
Sinđelić Beograd	0–0	3–0	3–1	0–0	0–0	1–0	1–0	0–0	2–0		3–2	3–1	1–0	0–0	1–3	1–0
Sloboda Užice	1–0	0–2	2–1	0–0	0–2	0–1	0–2	0–0	2–0	2–1		3–3	0–1	0–2	0–0	0–3
Teleoptik	3–0	0–1	3–1	2–0	1–4	0–4	1–2	0–0	0–0	0–0	1–1		1–1	0–4	2–1	0–1
Trayal Kruševac	1–1	1–2	2–1	0–2	3–0	1–3	1–1	1–0	2–0	2–1	2–1	0–1		0–0	1–0	1–1
TSC	2–1	4–1	0–0	4–1	2–1	3–1	2–0	6–0	2–0	1–1	4–0	3–0	2–0		2–0	1–2
Žarkovo	2–1	2–0	2–1	0–0	2–0	1–0	1–2	2–0	0–1	2–1	2–0	2–1	0–1	0–0		2–2
Zlatibor	1–2	0–3	2–0	2–0	1–0	1–2	1–0	2–0	1–3	2–0	3–0	2–1	2–0	1–3	3–0	

Source: Prva liga (in Serbian)
Legend: Blue = home team win; Yellow = draw; Red = away team win.
For upcoming matches, an "a" indicates there is an article about the rivalry between the two participants.

== Play-offs ==
=== Promotion round ===
The top eight teams advanced from the regular season. Points from the regular season were halved with half points rounded up. Teams played each other once.

==== League table ====
Pos	Team	Pld	W	D	L	GF	GA	GD	Pts	Qualification
1	TSC (C, P)	37	26	9	2	80	27	+53	53	Promotion to the Serbian SuperLiga
2	Javor Matis (P)	37	23	8	6	78	37	+41	46	Promotion to the Serbian SuperLiga
3	Inđija (P)	37	20	7	10	57	29	+28	39	Qualification for promotion play-off
4	Radnički 1923	37	16	11	10	42	36	+6	35	Qualification for promotion play-off
5	Metalac Gornji Milanovac	37	15	12	10	51	35	+16	33	Qualification for promotion play-off
6	Zlatibor	37	18	3	16	48	42	+6	32	Qualification for promotion play-off
7	Bežanija (Note: (Note: Bežanija and Borac were relegated due to financial issues. Their places was taken by Kolubara who was promoted from Serbian League Belgrade and Novi Pazar who avoided relegation.)) (R)	37	15	5	17	48	50	−2	28	Relegation to Serbian League
8	Sinđelić	37	11	13	13	35	43	−8	24	

Source: Prva Liga (in Serbian), Soccerway
Rules for classification: 1) Points; 2) Points in regular season; 3) Head-to-head points in regular season; 4) Head-to-head goal difference in regular season; 5) Head-to-head goals scored in regular season; 6) Head-to-head away goals scored in regular season (if two teams tied); 7) Goal difference; 8) Goals scored; 9) Fair play ranking; 10) Drawing of lots.
(C) Champions; (P) Promoted; (R) Relegated

==== Results ====
Home \ Away	BEŽ	INĐ	JAV	MET	RDK	SIN	TSC	ZLA
Bežanija		3–1				2–2	2–3	
Inđija				1–0	0–0	3–1		3–0
Javor Matis	3–1	3–1			1–1			4–1
Metalac Gornji Milanovac	2–0		1–1			3–0		
Radnički 1923	0–0			0–0				2–0
Sinđelić Beograd			1–3		1–2		2–2	
TSC		1–0	4–2	1–0	2–1			
Zlatibor	1–0			0–0		4–0	1–3	

Source: Prva liga (in Serbian)
Legend: Blue = home team win; Yellow = draw; Red = away team win.
For upcoming matches, an "a" indicates there is an article about the rivalry between the two participants.

=== Relegation round ===
The bottom eight teams from the regular season play in the relegation round. Points from the regular season are halved with half points rounded up. Teams play each other once.

==== League table ====
Pos	Team	Pld	W	D	L	GF	GA	GD	Pts	Qualification
9	Trayal	37	15	7	15	38	40	−2	32	
10	Budućnost Dobanovci	37	13	9	15	35	41	−6	32	
11	Žarkovo	37	14	9	14	42	44	−2	31	
12	Borac Čačak (R)	37	10	9	18	34	49	−15	27	Relegation to Serbian League
13	Bečej (R)	37	12	8	17	39	44	−5	26	Relegation to Serbian League
14	Novi Pazar	37	7	8	22	28	63	−35	21	
15	Teleoptik (R)	37	7	10	20	31	58	−27	18	Relegation to Serbian League
16	Sloboda Užice (R)	37	6	8	23	22	70	−48	16	Relegation to Serbian League

Source: Prva Liga (in Serbian), Soccerway
Rules for classification: 1) Points; 2) Points in regular season; 3) Head-to-head points in regular season; 4) Head-to-head goal difference in regular season; 5) Head-to-head goals scored in regular season; 6) Head-to-head away goals scored in regular season (if two teams tied); 7) Goal difference; 8) Goals scored; 9) Fair play ranking; 10) Drawing of lots.
(R) Relegated

==== Results ====
Home \ Away	BEČ	BOR	BDO	NPZ	SLO	TLO	TRA	ŽAR
Bečej		1–1	2–1	1–2		1–0		
Borac Čačak				3–1	2–0			1–0
Budućnost Dobanovci		0–2		1–0	2–0		3–2	
Novi Pazar						5–0	0–2	3–0
Sloboda Užice	1–1			1–4			2–1	
Teleoptik		2–1	0–1		2–2			
Trayal	1–0	1–1				3–1		1–1
Žarkovo	1–0		0–1		2–0	1–0		

Source: Prva liga (in Serbian)
Legend: Blue = home team win; Yellow = draw; Red = away team win.
For upcoming matches, an "a" indicates there is an article about the rivalry between the two participants.

== Promotion play-off ==
Promotions round final position
Pos	Team	Pld	W	D	L	GF	GA	GD	Pts
3	Inđija	37	20	7	10	57	29	+28	39
4	Radnički 1923	37	16	11	10	42	36	+6	35
5	Metalac Gornji Milanovac	37	15	12	10	51	35	+16	33
6	Zlatibor	37	18	3	16	48	42	+6	32

=== Semi-finals ===
11 May 2019
16:00

Inđija	2–1	Zlatibor
Dimitrov 28'; Dimitrijević 53'	Report	Miličić 35' (pen.)

Inđija Stadium, Inđija
Attendance: 1,000
Referee: Srđan Jovanović
11 May 2019
16:00

Radnički 1923	2–2	Metalac Gornji Milanovac
Vujasin 46'; Zdravković 50'	Report	Ješić 46'; Kecap 88'
Penalties
	4–1

Čika Dača Stadium, Kragujevac
Attendance: 7,000
Referee: Igor Stojiljković

=== Final ===
19 May 2019
16:00

Inđija	1–1	Radnički 1923
Dimitrov 41'	Report	Lukić 23'
Penalties
	3–0

Inđija Stadium, Inđija
Referee: Novak Simović

== Individual statistics ==
=== Top scorers ===
As of matches played on 5 May 2019.

Pos	Scorer	Teams	Goals
1	(Serbia) Ivan Marković	Javor Matis	29
2	(Serbia) Nenad Lukić	Inđija / TSC	22
2	(Serbia) Nikola Petković	Javor Matis	22
4	(Serbia) Vladimir Silađi	TSC	19
5	(Serbia) Lazar Milošev	Budućnost Dobanovci	15

=== Hat-tricks ===
Player	For	Against	Result	Date
(Serbia) Ivan Marković	Javor Matis	Teleoptik	4–0	8 September 2018
(Serbia) Marko Rajić	Žarkovo	Bečej	5–1	9 September 2018
(Serbia) Nikola Tripković	Borac Čačak	Žarkovo	3–1	8 October 2018
(Serbia) Mladen Kovačević	Bečej	Sloboda Užice	3–0	13 October 2018
(Serbia) Mladen Kovačević	Bečej	Budućnost Dobanovci	5–1	9 November 2018
(Serbia) Ivan Marković	Javor Matis	Žarkovo	7–1	18 November 2018
(Serbia) Nikola Petković	Javor Matis	Novi Pazar	6–3	6 March 2019
(Serbia) Ivan Marković	Javor Matis	Zlatibor	4–1	14 April 2019
