= OFK Žarkovo =

Serbian football club

Žarkovo
- Full name: Omladinski Fudbalski Klub Žarkovo
- Founded: 1925; 101 years ago
- Ground: Stadion OFK Žarkovo
- Capacity: 1,000
- President: Marko Pražić
- Head coach: Dušan Jevrić
- 2024–25: Belgrade First League – Group A, 14th of 14 (relegated)
Home colours	Away colours

OFK Žarkovo (Serbian Cyrillic: ОФК Жарково) is a football club based in Žarkovo, Belgrade, Serbia. They most recently competed in the Belgrade First League, the fifth tier of the national league system.

== History ==
Old club crest

In 2010, the club won first place in the Belgrade Zone League and took promotion to the Serbian League Belgrade. They spent eight seasons in the third tier, before finishing as champions in 2018 and earning promotion to the Serbian First League. In the 2016–17 Serbian Cup, the club defeated Metalac Gornji Milanovac on penalties in the opening round. They were subsequently eliminated by Partizan, losing 2–0. After spending four seasons in the second tier of Serbian football, the club withdrew from the league due to financial problems in June 2022.

== Honours ==
Serbian League Belgrade (Tier 3)

- 2017–18

Belgrade Zone League (Tier 4)

- 2009–10

== Seasons ==
Season	League									Cup
Season	Division	Pld	W	D	L	GF	GA	Pts	Pos	Cup
Serbia and Montenegro
2002–03	4 – Belgrade	34	17	7	10	66	37	58	5th	—
2003–04	4 – Belgrade	34	14	7	13	52	38	49	5th	—
2004–05	3 – Belgrade	34	16	5	13	51	43	53	7th	—
2005–06	3 – Belgrade	38	11	12	15	28	46	45	18th	—
Serbia
2006–07	4 – Belgrade	34	12	6	16	55	47	42	13th	—
2007–08	4 – Belgrade	34	12	10	12	35	37	46	8th	—
2008–09	4 – Belgrade	34	13	9	12	47	44	48	6th	—
2009–10	4 – Belgrade	34	27	4	3	66	20	85	1st	—
2010–11	3 – Belgrade	29	9	11	9	35	30	38	11th	—
2011–12	3 – Belgrade	30	14	5	11	37	26	47	4th	—
2012–13	3 – Belgrade	30	10	4	16	35	49	34	11th	—
2013–14	3 – Belgrade	30	14	9	7	45	38	51	2nd	—
2014–15	3 – Belgrade	30	12	5	13	40	38	41	10th	—
2015–16	3 – Belgrade	30	14	9	7	48	28	51	4th	—
2016–17	3 – Belgrade	30	14	7	9	53	36	49	4th	Round of 16
2017–18	3 – Belgrade	30	25	3	2	71	19	78	1st	—
2018–19	2	37	14	9	14	42	44	31	11th	—
2019–20	2	30 (Note: The season was shortened due to the COVID-19 pandemic in Serbia.)	10	10	10	35	36	40	9th	Round of 32
2020–21	2	34	16	5	13	35	34	53	6th	Round of 32
2021–22	2	37	14	7	16	40	41	49	6th (Note: The club withdrew from the league due to financial problems and was administratively relegated to the fourth tier.)	Round of 32
2022–23	4 – Belgrade	30	16	6	8	62	35	54	4th	Round of 32
2023–24	4 – Belgrade	30	7	8	15	49	62	29	11th	—
2024–25	5 – Belgrade First League - Group A	26	0	1	25	18	125	0	14th (Note: The club was docked one point.)	—

== Notable players ==
This is a list of players who have played at full international level.

- (Bosnia and Herzegovina) Stevo Nikolić
- (Liberia) Omega Roberts
- (Montenegro) Nikola Šipčić
- (Serbia) Miloš Bogunović
- (Serbia) Aleksandar Busnić
- (Serbia) Milan Lukač
- (Serbia) Bogdan Mladenović
- (Tanzania) Nassor Hamoud

For a list of all OFK Žarkovo players with a Wikipedia article, see Category:OFK Žarkovo players.

== Historical list of coaches ==
- (Serbia) Nikola Kavazović (2006-2008)
- (Serbia) Srđan Blagojević (2013)
- (Serbia) Goran Milošević (2014)
- (Serbia) Slobodan Živković (2014–2015)
- (Serbia) Milija Žižić (2015–2016)
- (Serbia) Dejan Rađenović (2016–2019)
- (Serbia) Ognjen Koroman (2019)
- (Serbia) Milan Kuljić (2019–2020)
- (Serbia) Dejan Nikolić (2021)
- (Serbia) Igor Savić (2021–2022)
- (Serbia) Zoran Ljubinković (2022)
- (Serbia) Milan Ćulum (2022–2023)
- (Serbia) Momčilo Ramić (2023)
- (Serbia) Dušan Jevrić (2024)
- (Serbia) Miljan Gajić (2025)
- (North Macedonia) Ivica Zdravkovski (2025)
