= Nemanja Ljubisavljević =

Serbian footballer (born 1996)

Nemanja Ljubisavljević Немања Љубисављевић
Personal information
- Date of birth: 26 November 1996 (age 29)
- Place of birth: Kruševac, FR Yugoslavia
- Height: 1.90 m (6 ft 3 in)
- Position: Centre-back

Team information
- Current team: Ironi Kiryat Shmona
- Number: 26

Youth career
- Trstenik PPT

Senior career*
Years	Team	Apps	(Gls)
2013–2015	Trstenik PPT	37	(2)
2016	Jagodina	0	(0)
2016	→ Tabane (loan)	13	(1)
2017	Radnički Niš	1	(0)
2017	→ Dinamo Vranje (loan)	3	(0)
2017–2020	Gorica	33	(2)
2020–2022	Žalgiris	72	(2)
2023	Vojvodina	12	(0)
2023–2025	Maccabi Bnei Reineh	63	(1)
2025–	Ironi Kiryat Shmona	29	(1)
- * Club domestic league appearances and goals as of 24 June 2026

Nemanja Ljubisavljević (Serbian Cyrillic: Немања Љубисављевић; born 26 November 1996) is a Serbian professional footballer who plays as a centre-back for Ironi Kiryat Shmona.

== Career ==
=== Prva Petoletka ===
Originating from Trstenik, Ljubisavljević started his career with local club Trstenik PPT in 2012–13 season in the Serbian League East at the age of 16. He noted 25 senior appearances between 2013 and 2014. Ljubisavljević earned an anterior cruciate ligament injury during the pre-season in a friendly match against Napredak Kruševac. After full recovery, he noted 4 appearances until the end of 2015–16 Serbian League East season. Ljubisavljević was involved in the incident after one duel with Andrija Radovanović during the match against Temnić on 24 October 2015. Playing for the club, Ljubisavljević made 37 appearances and scored 2 goals for 2 years as a bonus player in the Serbian League East at total as also the one cup match and several district cup matches.

=== Radnički Niš ===
After the whole 2016 he spent as a member of football club Jagodina, being also loaned to the satellite club Tabane Trgovački, Ljubisavljević moved to the Serbian top tier club Radnički Niš. Passing the trial period successfully, Ljubisavljević signed a four-year professional contract with the club. He was optionally loaned on dual registration to the Serbian First League side Dinamo Vranje until the end of 2016–17 season, where he made 3 appearances under coach Dragan Antić. Ljubisavljević made his official debut for Radnički Niš in last fixture match of the 2016–17 Serbian SuperLiga season against Red Star Belgrade at the Rajko Mitić Stadium on 21 May 2017 under coach Milan Rastavac.

=== Gorica ===
On 10 August 2017, Ljubisavljević moved to the Croatian Second Football League club Gorica, penning a two-year contract. He made his debut for new club in opening match of the 2017–18 campaign, against Dinamo Zagreb II. He scored his first goal for Gorica in the 5th fixture match for 1–0 victory over Hrvatski Dragovoljac on 9 September 2017. He also played Croatian Football Cup matches against Moslavina, GOŠK Dubrovnik. and Rijeka Ljubisavljević scored his second goal in 3–0 victory over Hajduk Split II on 10 March 2018. Securing promotion to the top tier of the Croatian football pyramid in 32nd fixture of the Croatian Second League, against Šibenik, Ljubisavljević won the competition with Gorica, after 1–0 victory over Dinamo Zagreb reserves in final game of the season. Next he missed the opening match of the 2018–19 campaign, against Rijeka as an unused substitution on the bench, Ljubisavljević made his debut in the Croatian First League on 4 August 2018, replacing Łukasz Zwoliński in 3–3 draw to Slaven Belupo.

== Career statistics ==
As of 1 June 2025

Appearances and goals by club, season and competition
Club	Season	League			Cup		Continental		Other		Total	
Club	Season	Division	Apps	Goals	Apps	Goals	Apps	Goals	Apps	Goals	Apps	Goals
Trstenik PPT	2012–13	Serbian League East	4	0	—		—		2 (Note: Including appearances in the Rasina District Cup match against Mladost Makrešane and Southern and Eastern Serbia cup match against Radnički Svilajnac)	0	6	0
Trstenik PPT	2013–14	Serbian League East	21	0	1 (Note: Including preliminary round match against Timok)	0	—		6 (Note: Including appearances in the OFS Trstenik Cup match against Poljoprivrednik, Rasina District Cup matches against Kopaonik Brus and Temnić and Southern and Eastern Serbia Cup matches against OFK Bor and Moravac Mrštane)	0	28	0
Trstenik PPT	2014–15	Serbian League East	4	1	—		—		—		4	1
Trstenik PPT	2015–16	Serbian League East	8	1	—		—		—		8	1
Trstenik PPT	Total		37	2	1	0	—		8	0	46	2
Tabane (loan)	2015–16	Serbian League East	13	1	—		—		—		13	1
Dinamo Vranje (loan)	2016–17	Serbian First League	3	0	—		—		—		3	0
Radnički Niš	2016–17	Serbian SuperLiga	1	0	—		—		—		1	0
Radnički Niš	Total		1	0	—		—		—		1	0
Gorica	2017–18	2. HNL	27	2	3 (Note: Including appearances in the preliminary round against Moslavina, first round against GOŠK Dubrovnik, and second round match against Rijeka)	0	—		—		30	2
Gorica	2018–19	1. HNL	3	0	0	0	—		—		3	0
Gorica	2019–20	1. HNL	3	0	2	0	—		—		5	0
Gorica	Total		33	0	5	0	—		—		38	0
Žalgiris	2020	A Lyga	19	0	0	0	2	0	1	0	22	0
Žalgiris	2021	A Lyga	29	1	1	0	7	0	1	0	38	1
Žalgiris	2022	A Lyga	24	1	5	0	13	0	1	0	43	1
Žalgiris	Total		72	2	6	0	22	0	3	0	103	2
Vojvodina	2022–23	SuperLiga	12	0	2	0	—		—		14	0
Vojvodina	Total		12	0	2	0	0	0	0	0	14	0
Maccabi Bnei Reineh	2023–24	Israeli Premier League	33	1	1	0	—		5	1	39	2
Maccabi Bnei Reineh	2024–25	Israeli Premier League	30	1	4	0	—		4	0	38	1
Maccabi Bnei Reineh	Total		61	1	5	0	0	0	9	1	77	3
Ironi Kiryat Shmona	2025–26	Israeli Premier League	0	0	0	0	—		0	0	0	0
Ironi Kiryat Shmona	Total		0	0	0	0	0	0	0	0	0	0
Career total			234	7	19	0	22	0	20	1	295	8

== Honours ==
Gorica

- 2. HNL: 2017–18

FK Žalgiris

- A Lyga: 2020, 2021, 2022
- Lithuanian Football Cup: 2021, 2022
- Lithuanian Supercup: 2020
