= Ivan Kostić (footballer, born 1995) =

Serbian footballer

Personal information
- Date of birth: 24 October 1995 (age 31)
- Place of birth: Zaječar, FR Yugoslavia
- Height: 1.91 m (6 ft 3 in)
- Position: Goalkeeper

Team information
- Current team: Omonia Aradippou
- Number: 12

Youth career
- Radnički Niš

Senior career*
Years	Team	Apps	(Gls)
2013–2015	Timočanin	40	(0)
2016	Radnički Pirot	15	(0)
2017–2019	Metalac Gornji Milanovac	50	(0)
2019–2021	Radnik Surdulica	50	(0)
2021–2022	Mladost Lučani	30	(0)
2022–2023	Enosis Neon Paralimni	33	(0)
2023–2024	Volos	10	(0)
2024–2025	Lamia	21	(0)
2025–	Omonia Aradippou	31	(0)
- * Club domestic league appearances and goals as of 14 June 2026

Ivan Kostić (Serbian Cyrillic: Иван Костић; born 24 October 1995) is a Serbian professional footballer who plays as a goalkeeper for Cypriot First Division club Omonia Aradippou.

== Career ==
=== Timočanin ===
Born in Zaječar, Kostić passed throw through the Radnički Niš youth categories and later started his senior career with Timočanin in the 2013–14 season, making 7 appearances in the Serbian League East. He also continued playing with the club as a bonus player in the next season. In the winter break-off season, he was elected for the best sportsman of Knjaževac in 2014. Playing for Timočanin, Kostić made 40 appearances in the Serbian League East at total between 2013 and 2015.

=== Radnički Pirot ===
After he had been nominated for the man of the match played between Timočanin and Radnički Pirot in the first half of the 2015–16 Serbian League East season, Kostić moved to Pirot at the beginning of 2016 and signed with Radnički. Kostić made his official debut for new club in the 17 fixture match of the season against Dunav Prahovo, when he was substituted in after Ivan Bulajić got a red card. In the next fixture match, against Sloga Despotovac, Kostić made his first league start for Radnički Pirot. In the last fixture match of the season, against Car Konstantin, Kostić replaced Bulajić in second half. Saving a goal until the end of a game, he won the Serbian League East with Radnički Pirot and made promotion to the Serbian First League. Kostić also played several Pirot district and Southern and Eastern Serbia cup matches against Jedinstvo Pirot, Lužnica, Rudar Podvis, Radnički Svilajnac and Radan Lebane. After Ivan Bulajić earned an injury at the beginning of 2016–17 Serbian First League, Kostić became starting goalkeeper from the 3rd fixture match against Mačva Šabac. After two lost matches and 4 goals conceded, Kostić saved his goal on the next 9 matches, spending 841 minute without a conceded goal.

=== Metalac Gornji Milanovac ===
At the beginning of 2017, Kostić joined Metalac Gornji Milanovac.

=== Mladost Lučani ===
On 22 September 2021, he signed with Mladost Lučani.

=== Volos ===
Kostić joined Volos on 23 July 2023. His transfer was negotiated by FIFA-licensed agent Spyridon Papavlasopoulos. He made his first league appearance on 24 November, against OFI Crete which ended in a 1–1 draw.

== Career statistics ==
As of 28 June 2026

Club	Season	League			Cup		Continental		Other		Total	
Club	Season	Division	Apps	Goals	Apps	Goals	Apps	Goals	Apps	Goals	Apps	Goals
Timočanin	2013–14	Serbian League East	7	0	—		—		—		7	0
Timočanin	2014–15	Serbian League East	19	0	—		—		—		19	0
Timočanin	2015–16	Serbian League East	14	0	—		—		—		14	0
Timočanin	Total		40	0	—		—		—		40	0
Radnički Pirot	2015–16	Serbian League East	3	0	—		—		2 (Note: Appearances in Pirot District Cup)	0	5	0
Radnički Pirot	2016–17	Serbian First League	12	0	—		—		3 (Note: Appearances in Southern and Eastern Serbia Cup)	0	15	0
Radnički Pirot	Total		15	0	—		—		5	0	20	0
Metalac Gornji Milanovac	2016–17	Serbian SuperLiga	1	0	0	0	—		—		1	0
Metalac Gornji Milanovac	2017–18	Serbian First League	30	0	0	0	—		—		30	0
Metalac Gornji Milanovac	2018–19	Serbian First League	19	0	1	0	—		—		20	0
Metalac Gornji Milanovac	Total		50	0	1	0	—		—		51	0
Radnik Surdulica	2019–20	Serbian SuperLiga	20	0	0	0	—		—		20	0
Radnik Surdulica	2020–21	Serbian SuperLiga	30	0	2	0	—		—		32	0
Radnik Surdulica	Total		50	0	2	0	—		—		52	0
Mladost Lučani	2021–22	Serbian SuperLiga	30	0	1	0	—		—		31	0
Enosis Neon Paralimni	2022–23	Cypriot First Division	33	0	0	0	—		—		33	0
Volos	2023–24	Superleague Greece	10	0	1	0	—		—		11	0
Lamia	2024–25	Superleague Greece	21	0	0	0	—		—		21	0
Omonia Aradippou	2025–26	Cypriot First Division	30	0	1	0	—		—		31	0
Career total			279	0	6	0	—		5	0	290	0

== Honours ==
Radnički Pirot

- Serbian League East: 2015–16
