= Miodrag Todorović =

Serbian footballer

Personal information
- Full name: Miodrag Todorović
- Date of birth: 10 September 1995 (age 31)
- Place of birth: Niš, FR Yugoslavia
- Height: 1.86 m (6 ft 1 in)
- Position: Striker

Team information
- Current team: Car Konstantin

Senior career*
Years	Team	Apps	(Gls)
2011–2014	Car Konstantin	70	(20)
2014–2016	Radnički Niš	16	(1)
2014–2015	→ Car Konstantin (loan)	28	(8)
2016	Babīte	5	(5)
2017	Radnički Nova Pazova		
2017	Dinamo Vranje	0	(0)
2017–2018	Radnički Nova Pazova		
2018–2019	Smederevo 1924		
2019	Tomášov		
2019	Tutin		
2019–	Car Konstantin		
- * Club domestic league appearances and goals as of 15 September 2019

Miodrag Todorović (Serbian Cyrillic: Миодраг Тодоровић; born 10 September 1995) is a Serbian football forward who plays for Car Konstantin.

== Career ==
=== Car Konstantin ===
Born in Niš, Todorović started his career with local club Car Konstantin. Beginning of 2012, Todorović signed two-year deal, and became the youngest player with scholarship contract in club history. Later, in 2014, Todorović contract with Radnički Niš, but stayed with Car as a loaned player. For the first 3 seasons, he scored 20 goals on 70 matches in Serbian League East. Miodrag also appeared in final cup matches in the district of Niš for 2013 and 2014. Although he had started 2014–15 season with first team of Radnički Niš, Todorović returned in Car Konstantin on dual registration until the end of season. He also continued playing with club on dual registration for the 2015–16 season.

=== Radnički Niš ===
Todorović signed five-year professional contract with Radnički Niš beginning of 2014, but he joined the first team 6 months later, for the 2014–15 season, and he was licensed with jersey number 44, later was given to Bauyrzhan Turysbek, after Todorović left on loan. Todorović made his official debut for Radnički Niš in the Serbian SuperLiga match against Red Star Belgrade, played on 10 August 2014, under coach Dragoslav Stepanović. Later, the same month, he made 1 more appearance, against Jagodina, but later he was to Car Konstantin, where he stayed until 2015. He scored his first SuperLiga goal for Radnički Niš in a match against Javor Ivanjica, played on 21 February 2016. Todorović left the club in summer 2016.

== Career statistics ==
As of 21 May 2016

Club	Season	League			Cup		Europe		Other		Total	
Club	Season	Division	Apps	Goals	Apps	Goals	Apps	Goals	Apps	Goals	Apps	Goals
Car Konstantin	2011–12	Serbian League East	20	8	–	–	–	–	–	–	20	8
Car Konstantin	2012–13	Serbian League East	26	9	–	–	–	–	1 (Note: Niš district cup)	0	27	9
Car Konstantin	2013–14	Serbian League East	24	3	–	–	–	–	1	0	25	3
Car Konstantin	2014–15	Serbian League East	16 (Note: Statistics by www.sportskastranajuga.com. Todorović scored 5 goals on 16 matches, and several matches missed. No information available about some fixtures.)	5	–	–	–	–	–	–	16	5
Car Konstantin	2015–16	Serbian League East	12 (Note: Statistics by www.sportskastranajuga.com and Sportski žurnal. Todorović scored 2 goals against Jedinstvo Bošnjace and 1 against Timok. Without info for the 13th fixture match against Radnički Svilajnac.)	3	–	–	–	–	–	–	12	3
Car Konstantin	Total		98	28	–	–	–	–	2	0	100	28
Radnički Niš	2014–15	Serbian SuperLiga	2	0	–	–	–	–	–	–	2	0
Radnički Niš	2015–16	Serbian SuperLiga	14	1	1	0	–	–	–	–	15	1
Radnički Niš	Total		16	1	1	0	–	–	–	–	17	1
Career total			114	29	1	0	0	0	2	0	117	29

== Honours ==
Car Konstantin

- Niš district cup (2): 2013, 2014
