= Stefan Stojanović (footballer, born 1988) =

Serbian footballer

Personal information
- Date of birth: 12 January 1988 (age 38)
- Place of birth: Jagodina, SFR Yugoslavia
- Height: 1.88 m (6 ft 2 in)
- Position: Forward

Youth career
- Rudar Plažane
- Građanski Svilajnac
- 2002–2006: OFK Beograd

Senior career*
Years	Team	Apps	(Gls)
2005–2006	OFK Beograd	(Note: In an interview made in late 2017, Stojanović was talking about the career, when also said he made a professional debut with OFK Beograd at the age of 17. Although he was listed as a member of the first team for the 2005–06 campaign in the First League of Serbia and Montenegro, there is no statistic parameters for the season.) 0	(0)
2006–2008	Diósgyőr	0	(0)
2008–2011	BSK Borča	48	(9)
2011–2014	Radnički Svilajnac	82	(66)
2014–2015	Radnički Kragujevac	6	(1)
2014–2015	→ Radnički Svilajnac (loan)	22	(25)
2015	Radnički Svilajnac	12	(12)
2016	Radnički Pirot	27	(10)
2017	Radnički Svilajnac	29	(36)
2018–2019	Smederevo 1924	38	(26)
2019	Jagodina Tabane	12	(6)
2020–2021	Radnički Svilajnac		
- * Club domestic league appearances and goals

Stefan "Šilja" Stojanović (Serbian Cyrillic: Cтeфaн Cтojaнoвић; born 12 January 1988) is a Serbian former professional footballer who played as a forward.

== Career ==
=== Early years ===
Born in Jagodina, Stojanović started playing football with football club Rudar, based in Plažane, after which he moved to Svilajnac, where he also played in academy since the age of 14, when he moved to OFK Beograd. He joined the first team at the age of 17, during the 2005–06 Serbia and Montenegro SuperLiga campaign. Later he moved in Hungary, where he spent 2 seasons with Diósgyőri VTK between 2006 and 2008, but without official caps for the first team.

=== BSK Borča ===
Stojanović returned to Serbia and joined BSK Borča for the 2008–09 season. In the first season with club, Stojanović made his first senior appearances and noted 10 Serbian First League caps. Winning First League side, BSK Borča was promoted in the best level league of Serbia for the next season, and Stojanović made his Serbian SuperLiga debut in the match against Mladi Radnik, played on 15 August 2009. During the time he spent with BSK Borča, he was mostly used as a defender, usually as a left side full-back or wing-back. Stojanović also made 9 SuperLiga appearances for the 2009–10 season, equal as the previous season, but scored 1 goal from the direct free kick in 3rd fixture match against Smederevo.

=== Radnički Svilajnac ===
After leaving BSK Borča, Stojanović moved to Serbian League East club Radnički Svilajnac for the 2011–12 season. Over the course of 2012, Stojanović scored 25 goals in the Serbian League East and was one of the most effective footballers of the Pomoravlje District. He was also nominated for the best footballer and sportsman in Svilajnac for 2013 year. After 3 seasons spent with Radnički Svilajnac and 66 goals scored in the Serbian League East, Stefan moved in Radnički Kragujevac in summer 2014, but shortly, after just 2 matches played, he returned in Radnički Svilajnac on loan. At the end of season, with 25 goals scored, Stojanović became the best scorer of the Serbian League East the fourth time in a row. In the first half of the 2015–16 season, Stojanović missed 2 matches because of yellow card accumulation, but scored 12 league goals on the rest of matches. Playing for Radnički Svilajnac, Stojanović scored over 100 goals in the Serbian League East until the end of the 2015. After a one-year period with Radnički Pirot, Stojanović returned to Radnički Svilajnac during the winter-break of the 2016–17 season. While with the club in 2017, Stojanović collected 36 goals in 29 matches at total.

=== Radnički Pirot ===
On 21 February 2016, Stojanović signed with Radnički Pirot. His first goal for the new club was in a second match, against Dunav Prahovo. Later he was a scorer in a matches against OFK Bor, and Temnić. Next he scored 2 goals each against his ex-club Radnički Svilajnac, and Timočanin. He also scored a goal in away match against Tabane for the first place of the 2015–16 Serbian League East season. Stojanović made 13 caps for the half-season scoring 8 league goals and missed 2 matches because of yellow card accumulation. He also played 2 matches in a cup of Pirot District against Jedinstvo Pirot and Lužnica and scored goals in a both of them, for winning a trophy in that competition. At the opening match of the 2016–17 season, Stojanović scored a goal against his former club Radnički Svilajnac in semi-final cup match of the Southern and Eastern Serbia. During the first half of the 2016–17 Serbian First League campaign, Stojanović collected 14 caps and scored 2 goals, in matches against Dinamo Vranje and Sinđelić Beograd.

=== Smederevo 1924 ===
In January 2018, Stojanović officially joined Serbian League West side Smederevo 1924, when he was given number 22 jersey. He made his debut for the club scoring 4 goals in the Smederevo Cup match against Osipaonica. He also made his league debut in 18th fixture match of the 2017–18 campaign against Zlatibor Čajetina. In the next fixture match, Stojanović scored the only goal for Smederevo in 3–1 home defeat against Tutin. On 15 April 2018, Stojanović scored a twice and made an assist in 7–1 victory over Karađorđe Topola.

== Career statistics ==
As of 15 April 2018

Appearances and goals by club, season and competition
Club	Season	League			Cup		Continental		Other		Total	
Club	Season	Division	Apps	Goals	Apps	Goals	Apps	Goals	Apps	Goals	Apps	Goals
BSK Borča	2008–09	Serbian First League	10	0	—		—		—		10	0
BSK Borča	2009–10	Serbian SuperLiga	9	0	—		—		—		9	0
BSK Borča	2010–11	Serbian SuperLiga	9	1	—		—		—		9	1
BSK Borča	Total		28	1	—		—		—		28	1
Radnički Svilajnac	2011–12	Serbian League East	28	16	—		—		—		28	16
Radnički Svilajnac	2012–13	Serbian League East	26	25	—		—		—		26	25
Radnički Svilajnac	2013–14	Serbian League East	28	25	—		—		—		28	25
Radnički Svilajnac	2014–15 (loan)	Serbian League East	22	25	—		—		—		22	25
Radnički Svilajnac	2015–16	Serbian League East	12	12	—		—		—		12	12
Radnički Svilajnac	2016–17	Serbian League East	14	15	—		—		—		14	15
Radnički Svilajnac	2017–18	Serbian League East	15	21	—		—		—		15	21
Radnički Svilajnac	Total		145	139	—		—		—		145	139
Radnički Kragujevac	2014–15	Serbian SuperLiga	2	0	—		—		—		2	0
Radnički Pirot	2015–16	Serbian League East	13	8	—		—		2 (Note: Including Pirot District Cup matches against Jedinstvo Pirot and Lužnica)	2	15	10
Radnički Pirot	2016–17	Serbian First League	14	2	—		—		2 (Note: Including appearances in the Southern and Eastern Serbia Cup against Radnički Svilajnac, and Radan Lebane)	1	16	3
Radnički Pirot	Total		27	10	—		—		4	3	31	13
Smederevo 1924	2017–18	Serbian League West	5	4	—		—		1 (Note: Including GFS Smederevo Cup match against Osipaonica)	4	6	8
Career total			207	154	—		—		5	7	212	161

== Honours ==
BSK Borča

- Serbian First League: 2008–09

Radnički Pirot

- Serbian League East: 2015–16

Individual

- Serbian League East best scorer (5): 2011–12, 2012–13, 2013–14, 2014–15, 2015–16
