= Srđan Ristić =

Serbian footballer

Personal information
- Full name: Srđan Ristić
- Date of birth: 10 August 1992 (age 34)
- Place of birth: Gnjilane, FR Yugoslavia
- Height: 1.76 m (5 ft 9 in)
- Position: Second striker

Team information
- Current team: Alto Astico Cogollo

Senior career*
Years	Team	Apps	(Gls)
2010–2013	Napredak Kruševac	35	(1)
2012	→ Bežanija (loan)	7	(0)
2013	→ Prva Petoletka (loan)	10	(1)
2013–2014	Radnik Surdulica	28	(3)
2015	Dinamo Vranje	12	(3)
2015–2017	Jagodina	2	(0)
2015–2016	→ Tabane (loan)	25	(8)
2017–2022	ATSV Salzburg	94	(72)
2023-	Alto Astico Cogollo		
- * Club domestic league appearances and goals as of 19 June 2017

Srđan Ristić (Serbian Cyrillic: Срђан Ристић; born 10 August 1992) is a Serbian footballer.

== Club career ==
Born in Gnjilane, Ristić started his senior career with Napredak Kruševac, where he stayed until 2013. After he appeared with Bežanija and Prva Petoletka as a loaned player during the 2012–13 season, Ristić permanently moved to Radnik Surdulica. Playing with the club, he noted 28 caps with 3 goals in the Serbian First League between 2013 and 2014. Ristić was also with Dinamo Vranje in early 2015. Shortly after he joined Serbian SuperLiga side Jagodina in summer 2015, Ristić moved on a one-year loan deal to satellite club Tabane Trgovački, where he scored 8 goals on 25 matches in the Serbian League East for the 2015–16 season. Signing a one-year professional contract with Jagodina in summer 2016, Ristić started new season with the club, but he needed to break his career due to injury he earned in the second fixture match of the 2016–17 Serbian First League against Kolubara, after which he lost one kidney.

== Career statistics ==
As of 19 June 2017

Club	Season	League			Cup		Continental		Other		Total	
Club	Season	Division	Apps	Goals	Apps	Goals	Apps	Goals	Apps	Goals	Apps	Goals
Napredak Kruševac	2010–11	Serbian First League	15	0	—		—		—		15	0
Napredak Kruševac	2011–12	Serbian First League	20	1	—		—		—		20	1
Napredak Kruševac	2012–13	Serbian First League	0	0	—		—		—		0	0
Napredak Kruševac	Total		35	1	—		—		—		35	1
Bežanija (loan)	2012–13	Serbian First League	7	0	1	0	—		—		8	0
Prva Petoletka (loan)	2012–13	Serbian League East	10	1	—		—		5 (Note: Including appearances in the OFS Trstenik Cup matches against Gradina and Poljoprivrednik, Rasina District Cup match against Mladost Makrešane and Southern and Eastern Serbia Cup matches against Kosanica and Moravac Mrštane)	7	15	8
Radnik Surdulica	2013–14	Serbian First League	20	3	—		—		—		20	3
Radnik Surdulica	2014–15	Serbian First League	8	0	—		—		—		8	0
Radnik Surdulica	Total		28	3	—		—		—		28	3
Dinamo Vranje	2014–15	Serbian League East	12	3	—		—		—		12	3
Tabane (loan)	2015–16	Serbian League East	25	8	—		—		—		25	8
Jagodina	2015–16	Serbian SuperLiga	0	0	—		—		—		0	0
Jagodina	2016–17	Serbian First League	2	0	0	0	—		—		2	0
Jagodina	Total		2	0	0	0	—		—		2	0
Career total			119	16	1	0	—		5	7	125	25

== Honours ==
Radnik Surdulica

- Serbian First League: 2014–15
