= 2018–19 Serbian League East =

Serbian League East
- Season: 2018–19
- Champions: Radnički Pirot
- Promoted: Radnički Pirot
- Matches: 306
- Goals: 915 (2.99 per match)
- Biggest home win: Jedinstvo B. 6–0 Dubočica
- Biggest away win: Tabane-Jagodina 0–3 Moravac
- Highest scoring: OFK Sinđelić 4–3 Dubočica
- Longest winning run: two clubs 4 games
- Longest unbeaten run: three clubs 7 games
- Longest winless run: two clubs 5 games
- Longest losing run: five clubs 3 games

The 2018–19 Serbian League East was the 16th season of one of the four third level leagues in Serbian football. The league consists of 18 teams. A higher level of competition is the First League, while the lower three Zone Leagues are West, East and South.

== Clubs ==
Jagodina withdrew from the Serbian League East for financial difficulties and inability to register players, and Tabane will play instead, from the full name FK Tabane-Jagodina.

=== Stadiums and locations ===
Location of teams in 2018–19 Serbian League East

Team	City	Stadium	Capacity
Budućnost	Popovac	Stadion Begavica	2,000
Car Konstantin	Niš	Stadion FK Car Konstantin	5,000
Dubočica	Leskovac	Gradski Stadion Leskovac	10,000
Dunav	Prahovo	Stadion FK Dunav	500
Jedinstvo	Bošnjace	Stadion FK Jedinstvo	500
Jedinstvo	Paraćin	Gradski Stadion Paraćin	12,000
Moravac Orion	Mrštane	Sportski centar Orion	2,000
OFK Sinđelić	Niš	Stadion FK Sinđelić	2,000
Pukovac	Pukovac	Stadion FK Pukovac	2,000
Radan	Lebane	Gradski stadion Lebane	3,000
Radnički	Pirot	Stadion Dragan Nikolić	13,816
Radnički	Svilajnac	Stadion Bojača	1,000
Rtanj	Boljevac	Stadion FK Rtanj	5,000
SFS Borac	Paraćin	Stadion SFS Borac	1,000
Tabane-Jagodina	Jagodina	Stadion FK Jagodina	15,000
Temnić 1924	Varvarin	Stadion FK Temnić	1,500
Trstenik PPT	Trstenik	Gradski Stadion Trstenik	3,000
Zaplanjac	Gadžin Han	Stadion FK Zaplanjac	500

== League table ==
Pos	Team	Pld	W	D	L	GF	GA	GD	Pts	Promotion or relegation
1	Radnički Pirot (C, P)	34	27	4	3	96	19	+77	85	Promotion to Serbian First League
2	Temnić 1924	34	25	5	4	66	20	+46	80	
3	Budućnost Popovac (Note: 1 point deducted)	34	20	4	10	74	36	+38	63	
4	Tabane-Jagodina (Note: 3 points deducted)	34	19	7	8	53	26	+27	61	
5	Car Konstantin	34	18	6	10	64	39	+25	60	
6	Moravac Orion	34	18	5	11	60	37	+23	59	
7	OFK Sinđelić Niš	34	15	6	13	53	41	+12	51	
8	Dubočica	34	14	3	17	62	66	−4	45	
9	Dunav Prahovo	34	14	3	17	54	54	0	45	
10	SFS Borac	34	13	6	15	37	44	−7	45	
11	Jedinstvo Bošnjace	34	14	2	18	41	55	−14	44	
12	Trstenik PPT (Note: 1 point deducted)	34	11	7	16	37	49	−12	39	
13	Zaplanjac	34	10	8	16	38	63	−25	38	
14	Radan (Note: 1 bonus point?)	34	10	6	18	31	52	−21	37	
15	Jedinstvo Paraćin (R)	34	11	3	20	36	72	−36	36	Relegation to Zone League
16	Rtanj (R)	34	10	4	20	45	62	−17	34	Relegation to Zone League
17	Radnički Svilajnac (R)	34	8	6	20	39	79	−40	30	Relegation to Zone League
18	Pukovac (R)	34	4	4	26	29	101	−72	16	Relegation to Zone League

Source: Liga Istok (in Serbian), srbijasport.net
(C) Champions; (P) Promoted; (R) Relegated

== Results ==
Home \ Away	BUD	CAR	DUB	DUN	JBO	JPN	MOR	SIN	PUK	RAD	RPI	RSV	RTA	SFS	JTA	TEM	PPT	ZAP
Budućnost Popovac		0–3	4–1	3–0	3–1	5–1	3–1	3–2	4–0	3–2	0–2	10–0	2–0	3–0	2–1	0–2	4–0	4–1
Car Konstantin	0–1		5–0	4–0	3–1	5–1	2–0	0–0	5–2	2–0	1–2	3–0	2–0	0–1	2–0	2–2	1–0	2–0
Dubočica	1–2	2–1		3–0	1–3	6–1	3–0	2–2	6–2	2–0	0–1	0–1	1–0	3–2	0–2	1–0	3–3	1–0
Dunav Prahovo	0–3	2–3	4–2		2–0	4–0	1–0	1–0	4–1	2–0	1–2	3–1	2–3	2–1	0–1	1–1	5–0	0–0
Jedinstvo Bošnjace	1–0	1–0	6–0	3–1		2–0	0–3	2–1	2–0	1–0	3–2	1–3	2–0	0–1	0–2	2–3	2–0	0–0
Jedinstvo Paraćin	0–4	1–0	2–1	2–1	3–2		0–3	3–0	2–5	2–0	0–3	1–1	3–1	1–1	0–2	1–2	1–1	1–2
Moravac Orion	3–0	1–1	4–1	3–1	2–3	3–2		1–3	2–0	2–2	1–1	4–3	3–2	1–0	1–1	0–0	1–0	6–0
OFK Sinđelić Niš	2–1	2–3	4–3	0–1	0–0	2–0	2–0		4–0	1–2	0–2	2–0	3–0	4–0	2–0	0–0	3–1	1–0
Pukovac	0–3	1–2	1–4	1–2	1–3	0–1	0–2	1–0		1–0	0–6	2–0	1–1	0–0	0–1	0–1	2–2	5–6
Radan	1–0	2–2	1–0	2–0	2–0	2–1	0–3	0–5	1–0		1–1	1–1	0–1	1–0	2–1	0–1	0–1	1–2
Radnički Pirot	5–0	1–3	5–0	4–0	5–0	5–0	1–0	3–1	4–0	7–0		6–0	6–1	3–0	1–1	2–1	0–0	2–0
Radnički Svilajnac	1–1	3–1	1–2	2–1	2–0	1–0	0–3	0–0	7–0	2–2	2–4		2–1	1–1	1–3	0–3	1–2	0–1
Rtanj	1–4	0–0	1–0	3–5	2–0	2–0	0–1	2–1	7–1	1–1	0–1	4–1		1–2	1–3	2–1	3–2	0–0
SFS Borac	1–1	1–1	1–1	3–2	1–0	0–3	1–0	0–3	6–0	1–0	0–3	1–0	2–0		1–2	0–1	2–1	4–0
Tabane-Jagodina	1–1	8–0	2–1	0–0	2–0	4–0	0–3	3–0	3–0	1–1	0–1	1–0	1–0	2–1		0–1	1–1	0–0
Temnić 1924	1–0	2–1	4–2	1–0	2–0	1–0	1–0	5–0	5–1	2–1	3–0	7–0	4–2	2–0	2–0		1–0	3–0
Trstenik PPT	1–0	0–3	0–3	2–1	3–0	0–1	1–0	2–3	4–0	2–0	0–1	4–1	3–2	1–0	0–1	0–0		0–0
Zaplanjac	0–0	2–1	1–6	0–5	5–0	1–2	2–3	0–0	1–1	1–3	0–4	4–1	2–1	1–2	1–3	2–1	3–0	

Source: FSRIS (in Serbian), srbijasport.net (in Serbian)
Legend: Blue = home team win; Yellow = draw; Red = away team win.
