= Željko Dimitrov =

Serbian footballer

Personal information
- Date of birth: 19 February 1994 (age 32)
- Place of birth: Pirot, FR Yugoslavia
- Height: 1.83 m (6 ft 0 in)
- Position: Forward

Team information
- Current team: Liaoning Shenyang Urban

Youth career
- Radnički Pirot

Senior career*
Years	Team	Apps	(Gls)
2011–2013	Radnički Pirot	23	(6)
2013	Radnik Surdulica	4	(0)
2014	Hajduk Beograd	13	(5)
2014–2015	Radnički Pirot	29	(18)
2015–2016	OFK Beograd	4	(0)
2016	→ Kolubara (loan)	14	(4)
2016	Fjarðabyggðar	7	(3)
2016–2017	Dinamo Vranje	20	(7)
2017–2018	Radnički Pirot	30	(11)
2018–2020	Dinamo Vranje	57	(21)
2021	Inđija	19	(4)
2021–2022	Radnik Surdulica	20	(0)
2022	Liaoning Shenyang Urban	12	(5)
- * Club domestic league appearances and goals as of 2 December 2022

Željko Dimitrov (Serbian Cyrillic: Жељко Димитров; born 19 February 1994) is a Serbian footballer who plays as a forward for Liaoning Shenyang Urban.

== Club career ==
Born in Pirot, Dimitrov started playing football with the local club Radnički. He made his first senior appearances in the 2011–12 Serbian League East. During the 2013–14 season, Dimitrov played with Radnik Surdulica in the Serbian First League and Hajduk Beograd in the Serbian League Belgrade. He rejoined Radnički Pirot in 2014. Dimitrov promoted himself as the best team scorer for the 2014–15 season with 22 goals in 32 matches. Dimitrov signed with OFK Beograd in summer 2015. In 2016, he played on loan at Kolubara. Later that year, he moved to Knattspyrnufélag Fjarðabyggðar, where he scored 3 goals in 7 appearances in the 1. deild karla. After the end of the season, Dimitrov returned to Serbia and joined Dinamo Vranje.

In summer 2018, Dimitrov returned to FK Dinamo Vranje for the second time. He left the club again at the end of the season.

== Career statistics ==
As of 27 November 2017

Club performance			League		Cup		Continental		Other		Total	
Season	Club	League	Apps	Goals	Apps	Goals	Apps	Goals	Apps	Goals	Apps	Goals
2011–12	Radnički Pirot	Serbian League East	4	0	—		—		—		4	0
2012–13	Radnički Pirot	Serbian League East	19	6	—		—		—		19	6
2013–14	Radnik Surdulica	Serbian First League	4	0	—		—		—		4	0
2013–14	Hajduk Beograd	Serbian League Belgrade	13	5	—		—		—		13	5
2014–15	Radnički Pirot	Serbian League East	29	18	—		—		3 (Note: Including cup matches of Pirot District and Eastern Serbia)	3	32	21
2015–16	OFK Beograd	Serbian SuperLiga	4	0	0	0	—		—		4	0
2015–16	Kolubara	Serbian First League	14	4	—		—		—		14	4
2016	Fjarðabyggðar	1. deild karla	7	3	—		—		—		7	3
2016–17	Dinamo Vranje	Serbian First League	20	7	0	0	—		—		20	7
2017–18	Radnički Pirot	Serbian First League	30	11	1	0	—		—		31	11
Career total			144	54	1	0	—		3	3	148	57
