= Stefan Sibinović =

Serbian footballer

Personal information
- Full name: Stefan Sibinović
- Date of birth: 25 August 1992 (age 34)
- Place of birth: Ćuprija, FR Yugoslavia
- Height: 1.79 m (5 ft 10 in)
- Position: Second striker

Team information
- Current team: Sloga Ćićevac

Senior career*
Years	Team	Apps	(Gls)
2009–2010	Jedinstvo Paraćin	13	(6)
2010–2013	Jagodina	0	(0)
2011–2013	→ Radnik Surdulica (loan)	48	(5)
2013	→ Sloga Despotovac (loan)	14	(7)
2014–2017	Temnić	100	(72)
2018	Tutin	4	(1)
2019	Jedinstvo Paraćin		
2019-2020	SFS Borac Paraćin		
2023	Morava Ćuprija		
2024-	Sloga Ćićevac		
- * Club domestic league appearances and goals as of 4 April 2018

Stefan Sibinović (Serbian Cyrillic: Стефан Сибиновић; born 25 August 1992) is a Serbian footballer who plays as a forward for Sloga Ćićevac.

== Club career ==
=== Early years ===
Born in Ćuprija, Sibinović grown up in Beograd, where he started playing football with local club. He started his senior career with Serbian League East side Jedinstvo Paraćin. Playing with the first a bonus player, he scored 6 goals on 13 matches for the first half of 2009–10 season. Sibinović moved to the Serbian SuperLiga side Jagodina in the mid season and signed a contract with the club at the age of 17. In summer 2011, Sibinović joined Radnik Surdulica, as a loaned player. He stayed with Radnik Surdulica for 2 seasons, helping team to make promotion in the Serbian First League. He also spent the rest of 2013 as a loaned player with Sloga Despotovac. After the end of contract with the club Sibinović left Jagodina in late 2013.

=== Temnić ===
Next he left Jagodina, Sibinović agreed on a deal with Temnić. He made his debut in the cup match under OFS Varvarin against Kostrež in February 2014, scoring a twice in 14–0 away victory, after which he also scored double in the next round match against Sloga Ćićevac. Noting a second successive hat-trick in 28th fixture match against Poljoprivrednik, Sibinović collected 18 goals in 11 league matches. Helping the team to make promotion to higher level, Sibinović came to be second league scorer with 22 goals. Sibinović made 16 appearances for the second half-season in the Rasina District league, missing a single match against Gradina in 33rd week of the competition. Sibinović also played Rasina District cup matches against Borac Bivolje and Prva Petoletka until the end of season.

At the beginning of the 2014–15 campaign in the Zone League West, Sibinović scored a twice in 4–0 victory over Lugomir. During the first half-season, Sibinović scored 25 goals in 12 games, including five against Dragocvet and two hat-tricks in matches against Poljoprivrednik and Levač. After scoring the only goal in the game, Sibinović injured during the home match against his ex club, Jedinstvo Paraćin. Later he missed the rest of a season due to knee injury, collecting 26 goals in 13 matches.

Having promoted in the Serbian League East, Sibinović also started new season as the first choice. He made 28 appearances and scored 11 goals during the 2015–16 campaign. He promoted himself as the best team scorer for the season, in front of Igor Pavlović, who scored 10 times. Sibinović also made two Rasina District cup matches against Poljioprivrednik and Trayal. During the 2016–17 Serbian League East campaign, Sibinović collected 12 goals in 29 matches, missing a single match in second-half. He was also awarded for a player of the match once time, helping the team to make promotion to the Serbian First League. Making 14 appearances with 1 goal in the first half of the 2017–18 Serbian First League campaign, Sibinović left the club in the winter break off-season.

=== Tutin ===
At the beginning of 2018, Sibinović moved to the Serbian League West side Tutin, along with former teammates Stefan Todorović and Borko Milenković. He made his debut under coach Ivan Babić in 1–0 friendly against Sloga Kraljevo on 10 February 2018, after which he scored his first goal for the club in a friendly game against Novi Pazar on 13 February 2018. Sibinović made his official debut for Tutin in 2–0 victory over Karađorđe Topola on 10 March 2018. Sibinović scored his first official goal for Tutin in 4–2 away defeat against FAP on 4 April 2018.

== Playing style ==
Standing at 5-foot-10-inches (1.79 m), Sibinović usually operates as an offensive player. He mainly plays as a second striker, being capable of playing as a centre forward. While playing in lower ranks of the Serbian football pyramid, Sibinović have scored double per appearance in average. Pairing with Igor Pavlović in attack, Sibinović figured as one of the most productive players in the team. He is also an accurate penalty taker. Through the time he spent with Temnić, Sibinović scored several hat-tricks, including a match against Dragocvet, played on 23 November 2014, when he noted five goals in the game.

== Career statistics ==
As of 4 April 2018

Appearances and goals by club, season and competition
Club	Season	League			Cup		Continental		Other		Total	
Club	Season	Division	Apps	Goals	Apps	Goals	Apps	Goals	Apps	Goals	Apps	Goals
Jedinstvo Paraćin	2009–10	Serbian League East	13	6	—		—		—		13	6
Jagodina	2009–10	Serbian SuperLiga	0	0	—		—		—		0	0
Jagodina	2010–11	Serbian SuperLiga	0	0	0	0	—		—		0	0
Jagodina	2011–12	Serbian SuperLiga	0	0	—		—		—		0	0
Jagodina	2012–13	Serbian SuperLiga	0	0	—		0	0	—		0	0
Jagodina	2013–14	Serbian SuperLiga	0	0	—		0	0	—		0	0
Jagodina	Total		0	0	0	0	0	0	—		0	0
Radnik Surdulica (loan)	2011–12	Serbian League East	27	4	—		—		—		27	4
Radnik Surdulica (loan)	2012–13	Serbian League East	21	1	—		—		—		21	1
Radnik Surdulica (loan)	Total		48	5	—		—		—		48	5
Sloga Despotovac (loan)	2013–14	Serbian League East	14	7	—		—		—		14	7
Temnić	2013–14	Rasina District League	16 (Note: Sibinović missed 33rd fixture match against Gradina)	22	—		—		4 (Note: Including OFS Varvarin Cup matches against Kostrež and Sloga Ćićevac and Rasina District Cup matches against Borac Bivolje and Prva Petoletka)	5	20	27
Temnić	2014–15	Zone League West	13	26	—		—		0	0	13	26
Temnić	2015–16	Serbian League East	28	11	—		—		2 (Note: Including Rasina District Cup matches against Poljoprivrednik and Trayal)	1	30	12
Temnić	2016–17	Serbian League East	29	12	—		—		—		29	12
Temnić	2017–18	Serbian First League	14	1	—		—		—		14	1
Temnić	Total		100	72	—		—		6	6	106	78
Tutin	2017–18	Serbian League West	4	1	—		—		—		4	1
Career total			179	91	0	0	0	0	6	6	185	97
