= Denis Ristov =

Serbian footballer

Personal information
- Full name: Denis Ristov
- Date of birth: 24 June 1990 (age 36)
- Place of birth: Pirot, SFR Yugoslavia
- Height: 1.75 m (5 ft 9 in)
- Position: Attacking midfielder

Team information
- Current team: Radnički Pirot

Youth career
- 1998–2008: Radnički Pirot
- 2009: Partizan

Senior career*
Years	Team	Apps	(Gls)
2006–2008	Radnički Pirot	1	(0)
2009–2010	Teleoptik	0	(0)
2009	→ Balkanski (loan)	7	(3)
2010	→ Radnički Pirot (loan)		
2011–2013	Donji Srem	30	(2)
2013–2017	Radnički Pirot	107	(41)
2017–2018	Novi Pazar	28	(5)
2018	Radnički Pirot		
2019–2021	Sileks	55	(10)
2021-	Radnički Pirot		
- * Club domestic league appearances and goals as of 19 June 2021

Denis Ristov (Serbian Cyrillic: Дeниc Pиcтoв; born 24 June 1990) is a Serbian football midfielder, playing for Radnički Pirot.

== Club career ==
=== Early career ===
Born in Pirot, Ristov started playing football with local club Radnički at the age of 8. He joined the first team of Radnički Pirot when he was 17, and made his debut in the last fixture of the 2007–08 Serbian First League season. Later, after club relegated in the Serbian League East, Ristov was sold to Partizan at the beginning of 2009, where he spent 6 months until the end of his youth career and scored 14 goals on 15 matches for youth team. Later he moved to Teleoptik, but he spent mostly time as a loaned player with Balkanski and Radnički Pirot between 2009 and 2010 period.

=== Donji Srem ===
Ristov joined Donji Srem at the beginning of 2011. After winning 2010–11 Serbian League Vojvodina, he was also one of the most standard players in squad during the 2011–12 Serbian First League with 2 goals on 26 league matches and 1 cup match. After Donji Srem promoted in the Serbian SuperLiga, Ristov made just 4 league caps, including historical win against his ex-club Partizan in which he played last 5 minutes of the match, and 1 cup appearance during the 2012–13 season.

=== Radnički Pirot ===
In summer 2013, Ristov decided to return in his home club Radnički Pirot. During the first half-season, he was used mostly as a reserve although he started season in first 11. Later, for the second half-season, he was standard player, missing 1 match and was also replaced just once time in the last match of 2013–14 Serbian League East season, and he scored 4 goals for the season. He also played Pirot district cup match against Balkanski. During the 2014–15 Serbian League East season, Ristov noted 26 league caps with 11 goals, and also played Pirot district cup match against Balkanski as the last year, and was in protocol in the final match against Lužnica. Later he also played against Železničar Vranjska Banja in the semi-final regional cup match. Ristov was one of the most important players in the 2015–16 season, scoring 16 goals on 27 Serbian League East matches. He also played Pirot district matches against Jedinstvo Pirot, and Lužnica.

== Career statistics ==
=== Club ===
As of 19 November 2017

Club	Season	League			Cup		Continental		Other		Total	
Club	Season	Division	Apps	Goals	Apps	Goals	Apps	Goals	Apps	Goals	Apps	Goals
Donji Srem	2010–11	Serbian League Vojvodina	3	0	—		—		—		3	0
Donji Srem	2011–12	Serbian First League	26	2	1	0	—		—		27	2
Donji Srem	2012–13	Serbian SuperLiga	4	0	1	0	—		—		5	0
Donji Srem	Total		33	2	2	0	—		—		35	2
Radnički Pirot	2013–14	Serbian League East	25	4	—		—		1 (Note: Appearances in Pirot District Cup)	0	26	4
Radnički Pirot	2014–15	Serbian League East	26	11	—		—		2 (Note: Appearances in Pirot District Cup and Eastern Serbia Cup)	0	28	11
Radnički Pirot	2015–16	Serbian League East	27	16	—		—		2	1	29	17
Radnički Pirot	2016–17	Serbian First League	29	10	—		—		1 (Note: Appearances Southern and Eastern Serbia Cup)	0	30	10
Radnički Pirot	Total		107	41	—		—		6	1	113	42
Novi Pazar	2017–18	Serbian First League	13	4	1	0	—		—		14	4
Novi Pazar	Total		13	4	1	0	—		—		14	4
Career total			153	47	3	0	—		6	1	162	48

== Honours ==
=== Club ===
Donji Srem

- Serbian League Vojvodina: 2010–11

Radnički Pirot

- Serbian League East: 2015–16
