= 2023–24 Serbian League East =

Serbian League East
- Season: 2023–24
- Matches: 240
- Goals: 777 (3.24 per match)
- Highest scoring: FK Timočanin 10-1 FK Žitorađa (26 May 2024)
- Longest winning run: 30 games FK Trayal
- Longest unbeaten run: 30 games FK Trayal

The 2023–24 Serbian League East was the 21st season of one of the four third level leagues in Serbian football. The league consists of 16 teams. A higher level of competition is the First League, while the lower three Zone Leagues are West, East and South.

== Clubs 2023–24 ==
=== Clubs and locations ===
Location of teams in the 2023–24 Serbian League East

The following 16 clubs compete in the Serbian League East during the 2023–24 season.

Club	Location
Budućnost	Popovac
Đerdap	Kladovo
Dunav	Prahovo
Jagodina	Jagodina
Jedinstvo 1936	Kruševac
Jedinstvo Paraćin	Paraćin
Meševo	Meševo
OFK Sinđelić	Niš
Pčinja	Trgovište
Radnički Pirot	Pirot
Radnički Svilajnac	Svilajnac
SFS Borac	Paraćin
Timočanin	Knjaževac
Trayal	Kruševac
Vlasina	Vlasotince
Žitorađa	Žitorađa

== League table ==
Pos	Team	Pld	W	D	L	GF	GA	GD	Pts	Promotion or relegation
1	Trayal Kruševac (C, P)	30	30	0	0	84	16	+68	90	Promotion to Serbian First League
2	OFK Sinđelić	30	16	4	10	52	45	+7	52	
3	Meševo (Note: 1 point deducted)	30	16	4	10	54	45	+9	51	
4	Radnički Pirot	30	16	2	12	61	43	+18	50	
5	Jedinstvo 1936	30	15	5	10	37	28	+9	50	
6	Jagodina	30	14	6	10	49	37	+12	48	
7	Dunav	30	13	4	13	43	43	0	43	
8	SFS Borac	30	13	4	13	53	54	−1	43	
9	Đerdap	30	13	4	13	39	52	−13	43	
10	Jedinstvo Paraćin	30	12	5	13	42	50	−8	41	
11	Radnički Svilajnac	30	12	3	15	62	51	+11	39	
12	Vlasina	30	11	6	13	51	44	+7	39	
13	Budućnost	30	10	8	12	51	53	−2	38	
14	Pčinja (Note: 4 point deducted) (R)	30	9	2	19	45	64	−19	25	Relegation to Zone League
15	Timočanin (Note: 5 point deducted) (R)	30	6	3	21	45	64	−19	16	Relegation to Zone League
16	Žitorađa (Note: 1 point deducted) (R)	30	3	2	25	21	100	−79	10	Relegation to Zone League

Source: Liga Istok (in Serbian), srbijasport.net
(C) Champions; (P) Promoted; (R) Relegated

== Results ==
Home \ Away	TRY	VLA	PCI	JPN	RPI	JAG	ŽIT	TIM	DUN	SIN	BRC	RSV	ĐER	JED	BUD	MES
Trayal Kruševac		2–0	3–1	3–0	4–1	2–0	4–2	2–0	3–0	3–1	2–1	2–1	4–1	3–0	4–1	1–0
Vlasina	0–1		3–2	2–0	0–1	3–0	4–1	3–2	1–1	5–1	1–2	3–1	2–1	0–1	1–3	2–2
Pčinja	1–3	3–2		4–3	2–1	0–3	5–0	4–0	0–3	1–0	1–3	3–2	0–0	1–0	1–1	2–1
Jedinstvo Paraćin	1–3	1–0	2–1		0–3	3–1	4–1	3–2	1–0	1–3	3–2	2–1	0–0	2–1	2–2	1–0
Radnički Pirot	0–1	0–0	5–2	4–1		1–0	6–1	2–1	0–0	1–2	2–1	4–3	2–0	1–2	6–1	1–2
Jagodina	0–2	3–2	2–0	0–0	3–0		1–0	3–2	2–0	4–2	2–1	2–1	6–0	1–1	1–1	1–1
Žitorađa	0–4	2–5	2–0	0–4	2–4	0–5			1–7	0–2	0–4	3–0	1–1	1–1	0–1	0–1
Timočanin	0–3	3–2	3–1	3–0	2–4	1–0	10–1		0–1	2–2	2–2	0–3	2–1	1–2	1–3	2–3
Dunav	1–3	0–2	1–0	2–1	2–1	2–2	5–0	1–0		3–1	2–0	0–4	3–0	1–0	2–1	2–3
OFK Sinđelić	1–2	0–0	5–1	2–1	3–1	4–1	2–1	2–0	3–0		2–1	0–4	1–0	1–1	2–1	3–2
SFS Borac	0–4	3–4	3–2	2–2	1–2	1–0	2–1	3–1	2–1	1–3		2–1	6–4	1–0	2–2	2–1
Radnički Svilajnac	0–5	2–2	5–4	3–1	2–0	0–2	6–0	1–1	3–0	2–1	3–2		5–1	0–1	4–0	1–1
Đerdap	2–4	3–2	2–0	2–0	1–4	1–1	1–0	1–0	1–0	2–0	0–1	1–0		1–0	4–3	3–0
Jedinstvo 1936	0–3	2–0	1–0	1–0	1–0	0–1	3–0	4–2	3–1	2–0	0–0	3–2	0–1		2–2	3–1
Budućnost	0–1	0–0	2–1	1–1	2–4	2–0	5–0	3–1	2–2	0–1	3–0	3–1	1–3	0–2		3–0
Meševo	1–3	1–0	3–2	1–2	1–0	4–2	3–0	3–1	3–0	2–2	3–2	2–1	4–1	1–0	4–2	

Source: FSRIS (in Serbian), srbijasport.net (in Serbian)
Legend: Blue = home team win; Yellow = draw; Red = away team win.
