= Vrlane =

- Village
- Location within Serbia
- Coordinates: 44°10′07″N 21°15′0″E
- Country: Serbia
- District: Pomoravlje District
- Municipality: Svilajnac

Population (2002)
  - Total: 180
- Time zone: UTC+1 (CET)
  - Summer (DST): UTC+2 (CEST)

Vrlane is a village in the municipality of Svilajnac, Serbia. According to the 2002 census, the village has a population of 180 people.
