= Troponje =

- Village
- Location within Serbia
- Coordinates: 44°09′52″N 21°17′16″E
- Country: Serbia
- District: Pomoravlje District
- Municipality: Svilajnac

Population (2002)
  - Total: 901
- Time zone: UTC+1 (CET)
  - Summer (DST): UTC+2 (CEST)

Troponje is a village in the municipality of Svilajnac, Serbia. According to the 2002 census, the village has a population of 901 people.
