= Radaca =

Radaca may refer to:

- Radac, a village located in Pejë, Kosovo
- Vladan Radača (born 1955), Serbian footballer
