= Marko Mančić =

Serbian footballer (born 1983)

Personal information
- Full name: Marko Mančić
- Date of birth: 16 November 1983 (age 42)
- Place of birth: Pirot, SFR Yugoslavia
- Height: 1.82 m (6 ft 0 in)
- Position: Forward

Team information
- Current team: Radnički Pirot (assistant coach)

Youth career
- Radnički Pirot

Senior career*
Years	Team	Apps	(Gls)
2001–2002	Radnički Pirot	46	(10)
2003–2006	Hajduk Kula	2	(1)
2003	→ Vrbas (loan)	6	(1)
2004	→ Elan Srbobran (loan)	6	(0)
2004–2005	→ Radnički Pirot (loan)		
2006	→ Radnički Pirot (loan)	16	(5)
2006–2008	Radnički Pirot	33	(8)
2008	Vlasina		
2009	Balkanski	10	(1)
2010–2012	Radnički Niš	42	(11)
2012–2018	Radnički Pirot	161	(37)

Managerial career
- 2018–: Radnički Pirot (assistant)
- * Club domestic league appearances and goals as of 14 July 2018

Marko Mančić (Serbian Cyrillic: Марко Манчић; born 16 November 1983) is a Serbian retired footballer, who last played as a forward for Radnički Pirot.

== Career ==
Mančić started out at his hometown club Radnički Pirot, making his senior debut in the early 2000s. He switched to Hajduk Kula in the 2003 winter transfer window, recording two appearances and scoring once until the end of the 2002–03 First League of Serbia and Montenegro. In the next three years, Mančić was sent out on loan to Vrbas, Elan Srbobran, and Radnički Pirot (twice).

In mid-2006, Mančić permanently returned to Radnički Pirot, spending two seasons at the club. He subsequently went on to play for Vlasina, Balkanski, and Radnički Niš. In the summer of 2012, Mančić returned again to his parent club Radnički Pirot, helping them win the Serbian League East in 2016, thus earning promotion to the Serbian First League.

In summer 2018, following the end of the 2017–18 Serbian First League campaign and relegation in the Serbian League East, Mančić retired from playing football professionally. He also stayed with Radnički Pirot as an assistant coach.

== Honours ==
Radnički Pirot

- Serbian League East: 2004–05, 2015–16

Radnički Niš

- Serbian League East: 2010–11
