= Mačevac =

- Village
- Location within Serbia
- Coordinates: 44°06′00″N 21°14′47″E
- Country: Serbia
- District: Pomoravlje District
- Municipality: Svilajnac

Population (2002)
  - Total: 217
- Time zone: UTC+1 (CET)
  - Summer (DST): UTC+2 (CEST)

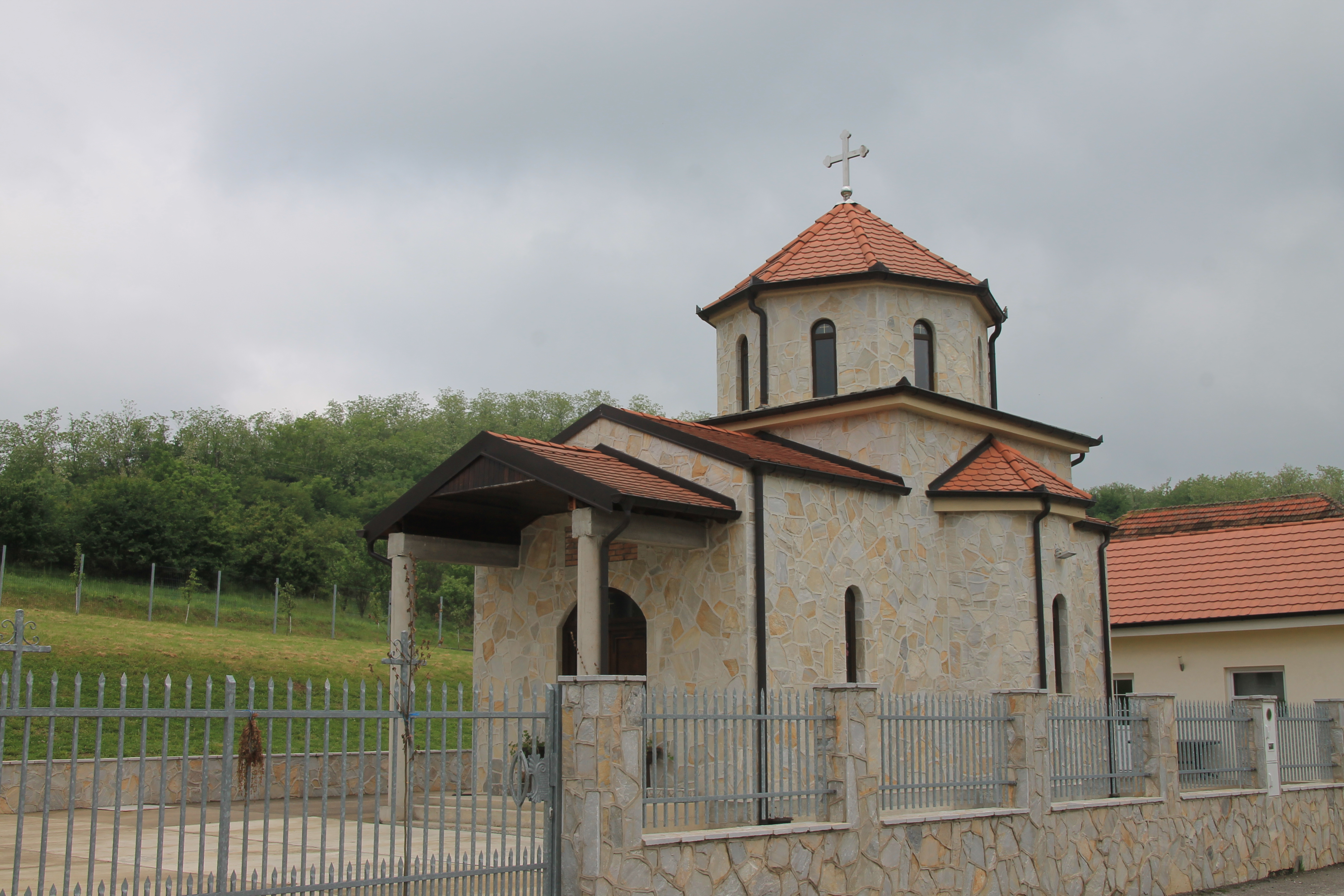
Church of the Holy Prophet Elijah in Mačevac

Mačevac is a village in the municipality of Svilajnac, Serbia. The village moved to it current site as a result of a combination of plagues, strong winds, and the threat of Ottoman invaders during the fall of the Serbian Despotate. According to the Svilajnac authorities, the village has a current population of 372 people, spread out across 73 households. Facilities include the Church of the Holy Prophet Elijah, who is the Patron Saint of the village.
