= Vladimir Sandulović =

Serbian footballer and manager

Personal information
- Full name: Vladimir Sandulović
- Date of birth: 18 May 1977 (age 49)
- Place of birth: Negotin, SFR Yugoslavia
- Height: 1.95 m (6 ft 5 in)
- Position: Centre-back

Senior career*
Years	Team	Apps	(Gls)
1997–1998	Timok		
1998–1999	OFK Beograd	23	(2)
2000	Stjarnan	14	(1)
2001–2002	Big Bull Bačinci	6	(0)
2002–2003	Timok	45	(2)
2004	Zemun	15	(0)
2005	Vorskla Poltava	11	(0)
2005–2006	Zemun	11	(1)
2006	Górnik Łęczna	1	(0)
2007	Național București	6	(0)
2008	Vasalund	4	(0)
2008–2009	Smederevo	26	(2)
2009–2010	Sevojno	22	(0)
2010–2014	Timok	33	(0)
Total		216	(8)

Managerial career
- 2014–2017: Timok
- 2024–: Red Star Belgrade U-18
- * Club domestic league appearances and goals

Vladimir Sandulović (Serbian Cyrillic: Владимир Сандуловић; born 18 May 1977) is a Serbian football manager and former player.

== Playing career ==
A towering defender, Sandulović started his playing career with Timok, before transferring to OFK Beograd in the summer of 1998. He would go on to play professionally in Iceland (Stjarnan in 2000), Ukraine (Vorskla Poltava in 2005), Poland (Górnik Łęczna in 2006), Romania (Național București in 2007), and Sweden (Vasalunds IF in 2008), before moving back to his homeland. After spending one year at both Smederevo (2008–09) and Sevojno (2009–10), Sandulović returned to Timok to finish his journeyman career.

== Managerial career ==
Following his retirement as a player in the summer of 2014, Sandulović was appointed manager of his former club Timok. He led the team to a fifth-place finish in the Serbian League East in his first season as a manager.
