= Mančić =

Mančić (Serbian: Манчић) is a Serbian surname. Notable people with the surname include:

- Anita Mančić (born 1968), Serbian actress
- Marko Mančić (born 1983), Serbian footballer
- Suzana Mančić (born 1956), Serbian actress
