= Ivan Bulajić =

Serbian footballer

Personal information
- Date of birth: 29 March 1995 (age 31)
- Place of birth: Belgrade, FR Yugoslavia
- Height: 1.93 m (6 ft 4 in)
- Position: Goalkeeper

Senior career*
Years	Team	Apps	(Gls)
2013–2014	Lokomotiva Železnik	0	(0)
2015	→ IMT (loan)	5	(0)
2015–2018	Radnički Pirot	53	(0)
2018–2019	Radnički Niš	2	(0)
- * Club domestic league appearances and goals as of 16 February 2019

Ivan Bulajić (Serbian Cyrillic: Иван Булајић; born 29 March 1995) is a Serbian retired footballer who played as a goalkeeper.

== Club career ==
On 27 June 2018, Bulajić signed with Radnički Niš. Bulajić made his official debut for Radnički Niš in 3 fixture match of the 2018–19 Serbian SuperLiga season against Dinamo Vranje, played on 5 August 2018, replacing Mladen Živković in the 34th minute after injury.

== Honours ==
Radnički Pirot

- Serbian League (1): 2015–16
