= 2012–13 Serbian League East =

Serbian League East
- Season: 2012–13
- Champions: Radnik Surdulica
- Promoted: Radnik Surdulica
- Relegated: Dinamo Vranje; Borac Bivolje
- Matches: 120
- Top goalscorer: Stefan Stojanović (13.goals)
- Biggest home win: FK Trgovački 6–0 FK Borac Bivolje (9 September 2012)
- Biggest away win: FK Radnički Svilajnac 1–7FK Car Konstantin (4 November 2012)
- Highest scoring: FK Dinamo Vranje 6–2 FK Car Konstantin (19 August 2012); FK Radnik Surdulica 5-3 FK Car Konstantin (14 October 2012)

The 2012–13 Serbian League East season. It began on 19 August 2012 and ended on 9 June 2013.

== Clubs 2012–13 ==
Clubs
Team	City	Stadium	Capacity
Borac	Bivolje	Stadion FK Borac Bivolje	1,000
Car Konstantin	Niš	Stadion FK Car Konstantin	5,000
Dinamo	Vranje	Stadion Yumco	5,000
Dubočica	Leskovac	Gradski Stadion Leskovac	10,000
Hajduk Veljko	Negotin	Gradski Stadion Negotin	4,000
Kopaonik	Brus	Stadion FK Kopaonik	2,000
Morava	Ćuprija	Gradski Stadion Ćuprija	10,000
Moravac	Mrštane	Stadion FK Moravac	2,000
Radnički	Pirot	Stadion kraj Nišave	13,816
Radnički	Svilajnac	Stadion Bojača	1,000
Radnik	Surdulica	Stadion FK Radnik	5,000
Sinđelić	Niš	Stadion FK Sinđelić	2,000
Sloga	Despotovac	Stadion FK Sloga	3,000
Trgovački	Jagodina	Stadion FK Trgovački	1,000
Trstenik PPT	Trstenik	Gradski Stadion Trstenik	3,000
Žitorađa	Žitorađa	Stadion FK Žitorađa	1,000

== League table ==
Pos	Team	Pld	W	D	L	GF	GA	GD	Pts	Promotion or relegation
1	Radnik Surdulica (Note: From Radnik Surdulica, Kopaonik, Trstenik was taken 1 point away.) (C, P)	30	21	3	6	62	34	+28	65 (Note: SIN 0–3 RSU; RSU 0–1 SIN; Radnik played playoffs for gaining promotion against Sinđelić as they had both 65 points. Radnik won 3-1 on aggregate.)	Promotion to Serbian First League
2	Sinđelić Niš	30	20	5	5	32	14	+18	65	
3	Radnički Pirot	30	19	4	7	46	14	+32	61	
4	Moravac Orion	30	13	10	7	49	30	+19	49	
5	Žitorađa	30	14	5	11	36	26	+10	47	
6	Dubočica	30	13	5	12	36	31	+5	44	
7	Hajduk Veljko	30	11	8	11	36	36	0	41	
8	Sloga Despotovac	30	12	5	13	44	47	−3	41	
9	Morava Ćuprija	30	13	2	15	34	53	−19	41	
10	Kopaonik	30	11	7	12	32	43	−11	39	
11	Radnički Svilajnac	30	11	5	14	52	56	−4	38	
12	Trgovački Jagodina	30	11	4	15	49	54	−5	37	
13	Car Konstantin	30	10	6	14	52	53	−1	36	
14	Trstenik	30	10	6	14	35	36	−1	35	
15	Dinamo Vranje (R)	30	9	4	17	38	50	−12	31	Relegation to Zone League
16	Borac Bivolje (R)	30	1	3	26	16	72	−56	6	Relegation to Zone League

Source: srbijasport.net
Rules for classification: 1) points; 2) goal difference; 3) number of goals scored.
(C) Champions; (P) Promoted; (R) Relegated

== Top goalscorers ==
13 (Serbia) Stefan Stojanović| Radnički Svilajnac

11 (Serbia) Milan Lazarević| Car Konstantin

o8 (Serbia) Milan Tasić| Hajduk Veljko

o8 (Serbia) Miroslav Petković| Sloga Despotovac

o7 (Serbia) Miloš Ilić| Trgovački Jagodina

o7 (Serbia) Nikola Pecić| Trstenik PTT
