= Vladan Radača =

Serbian footballer

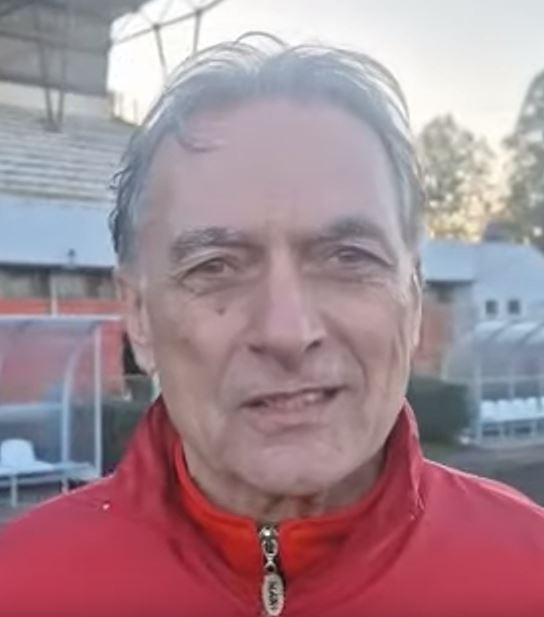
- Radača in 2023

Personal information
- Full name: Vladan Radača
- Date of birth: 15 July 1955 (age 71)
- Place of birth: Svilajnac, PR Serbia, FPR Yugoslavia
- Height: 1.86 m (6 ft 1 in)
- Position: Goalkeeper

Youth career
- Radnički Svilajnac

Senior career*
Years	Team	Apps	(Gls)
1972–1974	Radnički Svilajnac		
1974–1975	Radnički Kragujevac	0	(0)
1976–1977	Bor	46	(0)
1977–1978	Priština	21	(0)
1979–1980	Trepča	14	(0)
1981–1982	Majdanpek		
1982–1988	Rad	185	(0)
1988–1989	Željezničar Sarajevo	2	(0)
1989–1993	Samsunspor	105	(0)
Total		373	(0)

International career
1987–1988	Yugoslavia	5	(0)
- * Club domestic league appearances and goals

Vladan Radača (Serbian Cyrillic: Владан Радача; born 15 July 1955) is a Serbian former professional footballer who played as a goalkeeper.

At international level, Radača was capped five times by Yugoslavia in 1987 and 1988.

== Club career ==
Radača started out at his hometown club Radnički Svilajnac, making his senior debut at the age of 17. He subsequently joined Yugoslav First League newcomers Radnički Kragujevac in 1974, serving as the team's third-choice goalkeeper behind Aleksandar Stojanović and Vladimir Vučković.

Between 1982 and 1988, Radača spent six seasons at Rad, helping them win promotion to the Yugoslav First League in 1987. He became the club's most capped goalkeeper with 185 league appearances. After leaving Rad, Radača went to England and spent some time on trial at Blackburn Rovers, but left without earning a contract.

In 1989, Radača moved abroad to Turkey and played for Samsunspor over the next four seasons, making 105 league appearances.

== International career ==
At the age of 32, Radača became the oldest player to make a debut for Yugoslavia, coming on as a half-time substitute for Mauro Ravnić and keeping a clean sheet in a 4–1 loss to England on 11 November 1987. His fifth and final cap came on 4 June 1988 in a 1–1 friendly draw against West Germany.

== Post-playing career ==
After hanging up his boots, Radača worked as a goalkeeping coach for numerous clubs, including Rad, Sartid Smederevo, Radnički Niš, Red Star Belgrade, and Spartak Subotica.

In January 2021, following Zoran Filipović's appointment as Libya manager, Radača was hired as the team's goalkeeping coach.
