= Nemanja Milošević (footballer) =

Serbian association football player

Personal information
- Full name: Nemanja Milošević
- Date of birth: 18 August 1996 (age 30)
- Place of birth: Leskovac, FR Yugoslavia
- Height: 1.74 m (5 ft 9 in)
- Position: Midfielder

Youth career
- Sloga Leskovac
- Jagodina

Senior career*
Years	Team	Apps	(Gls)
2015–2018	Jagodina	48	(5)
2015–2016	→ Tabane Trgovački (loan)	22	(14)
2018–2019	Radnički Pirot		
2019–2020	Arcella	10	(2)
2020–2021	Radnički Pirot	27	(5)
2021-2023	Chiampo	33	(8)
- * Club domestic league appearances and goals as of 25 September 2018

Nemanja Milošević (Serbian Cyrillic: Немања Милошевић; born 18 August 1996) is a Serbian football midfielder who played for Radnički Pirot.

He later played in the Italian lower leagues for Arcella and Ciampo.
