= 2015–16 Serbian League East =

Serbian League East
- Season: 2015–16
- Champions: Radnički Pirot
- Promoted: Radnički Pirot
- Relegated: Timočanin; OFK Bor
- Matches played: 240
- Goals scored: 654 (2.73 per match)
- Top goalscorer: Stefan Stojanović (20)
- Biggest home win: Tabane 1970 13:0 OFK Bor
- Biggest away win: Radnički Sv. 1:4 Jedinstvo; Car Konstantin 1:4 Radan; OFK Bor 0:3 Trstenik PPT; Timočanin 0:3 Moravac; Radan 1:4 Sinđelić
- Highest scoring: Tabane 1970 13:0 OFK Bor (13 goals)

The 2015–16 Serbian League East is the 13th season of one of the four third level leagues in Serbian football. The league consists of 16 teams. A higher level of competition is the First League, while the lower three Zone Leagues are West, East and South.

== Clubs 2015–16 ==
=== Stadiums and locations ===
Location of teams in 2015–16 Serbian SuperLiga

Team	City	Stadium	Capacity
Car Konstantin	Niš	Stadion FK Car Konstantin	5,000
Dunav Prahovo	Prahovo	—	—
Jedinstvo Bošnjace	Bošnjace	—	—
Moravac Orion	Mrštane	Sportski centar Orion	2,000
OFK Bor	Bor	Stadion kraj Pirita	4,000
Ozren	Sokobanja	Stadion Bata Nole	2,000
Radan	Lebane	Gradski stadion Lebane	3,000
Radnički Pirot	Pirot	Stadion Dragan Nikolić	13,816
Radnički Svilajnac	Svilajnac	Stadion Bojača	1,000
Sinđelić	Niš	Stadion FK Sinđelić	2,000
Sloga Despotovac	Despotovac	Stadion FK Sloga	3,000
Tabane 1970	Jagodina	Stadion FK Tabane	1,000
Temnić 1924	Varvarin	—	—
Timok	Zaječar	Stadion Kraljevica	10,000
Timočanin	Knjaževac	Gradski stadion Knjaževac	4,000
Trstenik PPT	Trstenik	Gradski Stadion Trstenik	3,000

== League table ==
Pos	Team	Pld	W	D	L	GF	GA	GD	Pts	Promotion or relegation
1	Radnički Pirot (C, P)	30	19	9	2	54	20	+34	66	Promotion to Serbian First League
2	Tabane 1970	30	19	8	3	67	21	+46	65	
3	Sinđelić Niš	30	15	7	8	48	27	+21	52	
4	Car Konstantin	30	12	10	8	55	48	+7	46	
5	Dunav Prahovo	30	13	7	10	44	31	+13	46	
6	Temnić 1924 (Note: 5 points deducted)	30	14	8	8	43	26	+17	45	
7	Ozren	30	11	9	10	48	42	+6	42	
8	Radan	30	11	8	11	33	32	+1	41	
9	Trstenik PPT	30	11	7	12	35	35	0	40	
10	Moravac Orion	30	10	10	10	35	23	+12	40	
11	Timok	30	9	10	11	39	42	−3	37	
12	Jedinstvo Bošnjace	30	8	12	10	39	32	+7	36	
13	Radnički Svilajnac	30	10	5	15	40	61	−21	35	
14	Sloga Despotovac	30	9	6	15	30	49	−19	33	
15	Timočanin (R)	30	5	7	18	27	53	−26	22	Relegation to Zone League
16	OFK Bor (R)	30	1	3	26	17	112	−95	6	Relegation to Zone League

Source: srbijasport.net (in Serbian)
Rules for classification: 1) points; 2) goal difference; 3) number of goals scored.
(C) Champions; (P) Promoted; (R) Relegated

== Results ==
Home \ Away	CAR	DUN	JED	MOR	OFK	OZR	RAD	RAP	RAS	SIN	SLO	TAB	TEM	TIM	TMC	TRS
Car Konstantin		3–1	2–2	3–0	2–0	4–2	1–4	0–1	3–1	2–3	5–0	3–2	2–1	1–1	3–2	1–0
Dunav Prahovo	1–3		3–1	1–0	4–0	2–1	0–0	2–1	4–2	1–1	3–0	0–0	1–0	0–0	3–1	2–1
Jedinstvo Bošnjace	4–0	2–1		1–3	3–0	0–0	0–1	1–2	0–0	0–0	3–0	1–1	0–1	5–1	2–0	0–2
Moravac Mrštane	0–0	0–0	1–0		10–0	1–0	1–0	0–1	1–1	1–0	0–1	1–2	0–0	2–1	3–0	1–2
Bor	0–3	0–5	0–4	1–1		0–0	0–0	2–4	2–3	0–2	2–1	1–3	0–1	1–2	2–5	0–3
Ozren	2–2	1–1	1–1	1–1	6–0		3–0	2–2	2–0	2–0	4–0	1–1	2–1	1–1	3–1	2–1
Radan	4–1	1–0	1–1	0–2	4–0	2–1		0–0	3–0	1–4	1–0	1–1	0–0	3–0	1–0	4–0
Radnički Pirot	3–0	4–0	0–0	1–0	3–1	3–0	1–0		4–2	1–0	1–1	1–1	2–0	1–1	1–0	3–0
Radnički Svilajnac	3–2	1–0	1–4	3–1	4–3	2–3	3–0	0–2		1–3	2–0	1–1	0–4	2–1	5–1	3–1
Sinđelić Niš	2–2	2–1	1–1	1–0	3–0	3–0	4–0	0–0	0–0		3–0	1–2	1–0	2–0	2–2	4–0
Sloga Despotovac	2–2	2–1	2–0	1–1	3–0	2–3	1–1	1–3	2–0	3–1		0–1	0–1	0–0	1–0	2–0
Tabane 1970	2–2	1–1	2–1	1–0	13–0	2–0	3–1	0–2	3–0	2–1	4–0		2–0	2–0	8–1	2–0
Temnić 1924	1–1	1–0	6–2	1–1	3–0	3–0	1–0	2–2	2–0	3–0	1–3	0–1		4–0	1–0	2–1
Timok	3–1	0–2	0–0	0–0	6–1	3–1	2–0	4–2	4–0	0–2	2–0	0–3	2–2		3–1	2–2
Timočanin	0–0	1–0	0–0	0–3	4–1	0–3	0–0	0–3	5–0	1–2	1–1	0–1	0–0	0–0		0–1
Trstenik PPT	1–1	1–2	0–0	0–0	7–0	3–1	2–0	0–0	0–0	1–0	3–1	1–0	1–1	1–0	0–1	

Source: srbijasport.net (in Serbian)
Legend: Blue = home team win; Yellow = draw; Red = away team win.

== Top goalscorers ==
As of matches played on 29 May 2016.

Top goalscorers
Pos	Scorer	Team	Goals
1	(Serbia) Stefan Stojanović	Radnički Svilajnac / Radnički Pirot	20
2	(Serbia) Milan Lazarević	Sinđelić Niš	17
3	(Serbia) Denis Ristov	Radnički Pirot	16
4	(Serbia) Nemanja Milošević	Tabane 1970	15
5	(Serbia) Aleksandar Stojković	Car Konstantin	11
5	(Serbia) Stefan Sibinović	Temnić 1924	11
7	(Serbia) Igor Pavlović	Temnić 1924	10
7	(Serbia) Nikola Mladenović	Jedinstvo Bošnjace	10
7	(Serbia) Nemanja Stojaković	Ozren	10
7	(Serbia) Srđan Ristić	Tabane 1970	10
