= 2009–10 Serbian League East =

Serbian League East
- Season: 2009–10
- Champions: Sinđelić
- Promoted: Sinđelić
- Relegated: Jedinstvo (B); Župa; Balkanski
- Matches played: 240
- Goals scored: 687 (2.86 per match)
- Biggest home win: Radnički (P) 6–0 Rudar (8 November 2009)
- Biggest away win: Jedinstvo (B) 0–4 Timok (17 October 2009); Župa 0–4 Sinđelić (29 May 2010)
- Highest scoring: Balkanski 5–3 Dubočica (6 June 2010)

The 2009–10 Serbian League East season was the seventh season of the league under its current title. It began on 15 August 2009 and ended on 6 June 2010.

== League table ==
Pos	Team	Pld	W	D	L	GF	GA	GD	Pts	Promotion or relegation
1	Sinđelić Niš (C, P)	30	23	5	2	55	17	+38	74	Promotion to Serbian First League
2	Timok	30	22	5	3	58	20	+38	71	
3	Radnički Svilajnac	30	20	3	7	48	29	+19	63	
4	Radnički Pirot	30	13	4	13	53	40	+13	43	
5	Dubočica	30	12	3	15	46	49	−3	39	
6	Kopaonik	30	11	6	13	43	36	+7	39	
7	Radnik Surdulica	30	10	8	12	42	41	+1	38	
8	Car Konstantin	30	10	7	13	45	53	−8	37	
9	Svrljig	30	11	4	15	41	48	−7	37	
10	Hajduk Veljko	30	9	10	11	41	47	−6	37	
11	Vlasina	30	11	4	15	42	42	0	37	
12	Rudar Aleksinac	30	10	6	14	40	60	−20	36	
13	Jedinstvo Paraćin	30	11	2	17	36	42	−6	35	
14	Balkanski (R)	30	10	4	16	43	57	−14	34	Relegation to Zone League
15	Župa (R)	30	7	9	14	28	54	−26	30	Relegation to Zone League
16	Jedinstvo Bošnjace (R)	30	6	8	16	26	52	−26	26	Relegation to Zone League

Source: srbijasport.net
Rules for classification: 1) points; 2) goal difference; 3) number of goals scored.
(C) Champions; (P) Promoted; (R) Relegated
