= Bivolje =

Coordinates: 43°35′00″N 21°19′36″E

Bivolje Бивоље
- Village in Kruševac
- Interactive map of Bivolje
- Country: Serbia
- District: Rasina District
- City: Kruševac

Population (2011)
  - Total: 271
- Time zone: UTC+1 (CET)
  - Summer (DST): UTC+2 (CEST)
- Postal code: 37000

Bivolje is a village near the city of Kruševac, Serbia. According to the 2012 census, it has a population of 271.
