= 2022–23 Serbian League East =

Serbian League East
- Season: 2022–23
- Champions: Dubočica
- Matches: 240
- Goals: 710 (2.96 per match)
- Biggest home win: Dubočica 8–0 Brzi Brod
- Biggest away win: Dunav 1–6 Radnički Pirot

The 2022–23 Serbian League East was the 20th season of one of the four third level leagues in Serbian football. The league consists of 16 teams. A higher level of competition is the First League, while the lower three Zone Leagues are West, East and South.
