= FK Moravac Mrštane =

Serbian football club

Moravac Mrštane
- Full name: FSU Moravac 1947
- Founded: 21 May 1947; 78 years ago
- Ground: Blato, Mrštane
- Capacity: 608
- President: Milan Cvetković
- League: City League Leskovac
Home colours	Away colours

FSU Moravac 1947 (Serbian Cyrillic: ФК Моравац Мрштане) is a football club based in Mrštane, Serbia. They compete in the Gradska Liga Leskovac (City League Leskovac), the 7th tier of the national league system.

== History ==
The club was founded on 21 May 1947. They finished as Niš Zone League champions in the 2011–12 season and earned promotion to the third tier. The club won the Serbian League East in the 2013–14 season and got promoted to the Serbian First League, reaching the second tier for the first time in history. However, after finishing 13th in the 2014–15 season, they were immediately relegated back to the Serbian League East. The club would spend the next six seasons in the third tier, before suffering relegation to the fourth tier in 2021.

They were known as FK Moravac Orion until they withdrew in 2024 and were refounded as FSU Moravac 1947.

== Honours ==
Serbian League East (Tier 3)

- 2013–14

Niš Zone League (Tier 4)

- 2011–12

== Seasons ==
Season	League									Cup
Season	Division	Pld	W	D	L	GF	GA	Pts	Pos	Cup
Serbia
2012–13	3 – East	30	13	10	7	49	30	49	4th	—
2013–14	3 – East	30	19	6	5	44	13	63	1st	—
2014–15	2	30	10	5	15	32	41	35	13th	Round of 32
2015–16	3 – East	30	10	10	10	35	23	40	10th	Round of 32
2016–17	3 – East	30	19	4	7	53	19	61	2nd	—
2017–18	3 – East	30	13	2	15	46	40	41	12th	—
2018–19	3 – East	34	18	5	11	60	37	59	6th	—
2019–20	3 – East	17 (Note: The season was cut short due to the COVID-19 pandemic in Serbia.)	7	3	7	21	22	24	9th	—
2020–21	3 – East	38	2	1	35	33	182	6	20th	—
2021–22	4 – South	26	0	1	25	24	119	0 (Note: The club was docked one point.)	14th	—
2022–23	5 – Jablanica	30	1	0	29	27	156	2	16th	—
2023–24	6 – Inter-municipal Jablanica League	28	13	2	13	62	61	41	8th	—

== Notable players ==
This is a list of players who have played at full international level.

- (North Macedonia) Tihomir Kostadinov

For a list of all FK Moravac Mrštane players with a Wikipedia article, see Category:FK Moravac Mrštane players.
