= FK Timok =

Serbian football club

Timok
- Full name: Fudbalski Klub Timok 1919
- Nickname: Beli labudovi (The White Swans)
- Founded: 1919; 107 years ago
- Ground: Kraljevica Stadium, Zaječar
- Capacity: 8,168
- President: Milorad Vučković
- Head coach: Milan Ćirić
- League: Serbian League East
- 2024–25: Serbian League East, 7th
Home colours	Away colours

FK Timok 1919 (Serbian Cyrillic: ФК Тимок 1919) is a football club based in Zaječar, Serbia. They compete in the Serbian League East, the third tier of the national league system.

== History ==
Founded in 1919, the club participated in the regional leagues during its early stages. They achieved their first notable success by defeating Dinamo Zagreb 3–1 in the first round of the 1973 Yugoslav Cup. The club also competed in the Yugoslav Second League for three seasons between 1981 and 1984.

After the dissolution of SFR Yugoslavia, the club reached the second tier for the second time, but finished bottom of the table in the 1992–93 Second League of FR Yugoslavia. They would later spend two seasons in the Second League of Serbia and Montenegro from 2002 to 2004, when they were relegated to the Serbian League East.

On 26 October 2005, the club made one of its greatest achievements in its history by eliminating Partizan away in the 2005–06 Serbia and Montenegro Cup round of 16. They won 5–4 on penalties after a 1–1 draw in regular time. The club was eventually knocked out of the competition in the quarter-final after losing 2–0 away to Radnički Niš.

In the 2008–09 season, the club finished second in the Serbian League East, subsequently losing 5–4 on penalties to Teleoptik (after two 1–1 draws) in the promotion play-offs. They were finally promoted to the Serbian First League after winning the 2011–12 Serbian League East title. The club spent two seasons in the second tier of Serbian football, before being relegated back to the Serbian League East in 2014.

After finishing second from the bottom in the 2017–18 Serbian League East, the club got relegated to the fourth tier and was supposed to play in the Zone League East. However, they were unable to compete due to financial reasons, causing them to go inactive. Simultaneously, the Zaječar District League champions and the Zone League East newcomers, FK Radnički Lubnica was relocated to Zaječar and renamed to FK Timok 1919, becoming FK Timok's de facto successor.

== Honours ==
Serbian League Timok / Serbian League East (Tier 3)

- 2001–02 / 2011–12, 2020–21

Zone League East (Tier 4)

- 2023–24

== Seasons ==
Season	League									Cup
Season	Division	Pld	W	D	L	GF	GA	Pts	Pos	Cup
Serbia and Montenegro
1995–96	3 – Timok	34	16	0	18	72	65	48	6th	—
1996–97	3 – Timok	34	16	5	13	73	42	53	4th	—
1997–98	3 – Timok	34	15	6	13	71	40	51	5th	—
1998–99	3 – Timok	17 (Note: The season was cut short due to the NATO bombing of Yugoslavia.)	–	–	–	–	–	23	11th	—
1999–2000	3 – Timok	38	17	6	15	67	49	57	6th	—
2000–01	3 – Timok	34	25	3	6	62	23	78	2nd	—
2001–02	3 – Timok	34	23	2	9	105	34	71	1st	—
2002–03	2 – East	33	13	11	9	45	29	50	3rd	—
2003–04	2 – East	36	13	6	17	43	52	45	9th	—
2004–05	3 – East	34	15	7	12	68	46	52	8th	—
2005–06	3 – East	34	15	6	13	50	38	51	7th	Quarter-finals
Serbia
2006–07	3 – East	34	13	11	10	52	32	50	9th	Round of 32
2007–08	3 – East	30	12	7	11	45	36	43	6th	—
2008–09	3 – East	28	17	6	5	44	14	57	2nd	—
2009–10	3 – East	30	22	5	3	58	20	71	2nd	—
2010–11	3 – East	30	12	6	12	39	34	42	12th	—
2011–12	3 – East	30	19	6	5	43	18	63	1st	—
2012–13	2	34	11	10	13	37	48	43	11th	Round of 32
2013–14	2	30	8	10	12	26	35	34	13th	Preliminary round
2014–15	3 – East	30	14	6	10	36	27	48	5th	Preliminary round
2015–16	3 – East	30	9	10	11	39	42	37	11th	—
2016–17	3 – East	30	11	10	9	28	21	36 (Note: The club was docked seven points.)	10th	—
2017–18	3 – East	30	5	4	21	33	58	19	15th	—
2018–19	4 – East	30	22	5	3	62	28	71	2nd	—
2019–20	4 – East	17 (Note: The season was cut short due to the COVID-19 pandemic in Serbia.)	12	3	2	36	13	39	2nd	—
2020–21	3 – East	38	26	5	7	73	26	83	1st	—
2021–22	2	37	11	7	19	38	44	40	14th	—
2022–23	3 – East	30	6	6	18	24	59	24	15th	Preliminary round
2023–24	4 – East	28	25	2	1	84	11	77	1st	—
2024–25	3 – East	30	13	6	11	39	37	45	7th	—
2025–26	3 – East									—

== Supporters ==
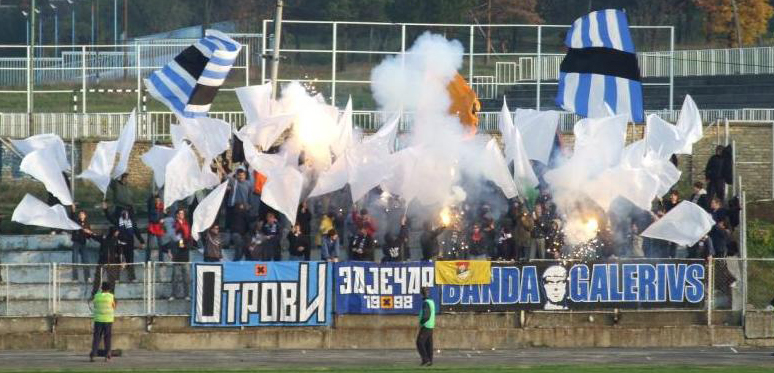
Otrovi celebrating their 10-year anniversary in 2008

The club's main supporters group is known as Otrovi (The Poisons). They were founded in 1998, celebrating their 10-year anniversary in a Serbian League East fixture with Župa Aleksandrovac on 15 November 2008. The group is traditionally situated in the east stand of the stadium.

== Notable players ==
This is a list of players who have played at full international level.

- (Ghana) Yaw Antwi
- (Montenegro) Darko Božović
- (Serbia) Aleksandar Andrejević
- (Serbia) Miloš Simonović
- (Socialist Federal Republic of Yugoslavia) Milorad Janković
- (Socialist Federal Republic of Yugoslavia) Živan Ljukovčan
- (Socialist Federal Republic of Yugoslavia) Dragan Pantelić

For a list of all FK Timok players with a Wikipedia article, see Category:FK Timok players.

== Historical list of coaches ==
- (Serbia and Montenegro) Zoran Đorđević (2000-2001)
- (Serbia and Montenegro) Ljubiša Stamenković (2002-2003)
- (Serbia and Montenegro) Dragutin Ivković
- (Serbia) Dragoslav Đokić
- (Serbia) Nebojša Vučićević (2009)
- (Serbia) Milan Dimoski (2009)
- (Serbia) Miljojko Gošić (2010)
- (Serbia) Žarko Soldo (2011)
- (Serbia) Momčilo Raičević (2011–2013)
- (Serbia) Dragutin Ivković (2013)
- (Serbia) Dragan Antić (2013)
- (Serbia) Nenad Grozdić (2013)
- (Serbia) Nebojša Vučićević (2014)
- (Serbia) Dragutin Ivković (2014)
- (Serbia) Vladimir Sandulović (2014–2017)
- (Serbia) Goran Stanković (2017)
- (Serbia) Konstantin Đurić (2018)
- (Serbia) Zaviša Milosavljević (2018)
- (Serbia) Miroslav Trujkić (2018)
- (Serbia) Predrag Živković (2019)
- (Serbia) Miroslav Nikolić (2019)
- (Serbia) Vojkan Rajčić (2020–2021)
- (Germany) Thomas Vasov (2021)
- (Serbia) Srđan Stojčevski (2021–2022)
- (Serbia) Jovan Dabić (2022)
- (Serbia) Miroslav Trujkić (2022)
- (Bosnia and Herzegovina) Slobodan Halilović (2022)
- (Serbia) Vojkan Rajčić (2022–2023)
- (Serbia) Miroslav Nikolić (2023–2024)
- (Serbia) Žarko Jovanović (2024)
- (Serbia) Denis Jovan (2024-2025)
- (Serbia) Vojkan Rajčić (2025)
- (Serbia) Nebojša Maksimović (2025)
- (Serbia) Milan Ćirić (2025-)
