= FK Radnički Svilajnac =

Serbian football club

Radnički Svilajnac
- Full name: Fudbalski Klub Radnički Svilajnac
- Founded: 1938; 88 years ago
- Ground: Stadion Bojača, Svilajnac
- Capacity: 1,000
- President: Dragan Vićentijević
- Head coach: Zoran Terzić
- League: Zone League West
- 2024–25: Serbian League East, 15th of 16
Home colours	Away colours

FK Radnički Svilajnac (Serbian Cyrillic: ФК Раднички Свилајнац) is a football club based in Svilajnac, Serbia. They compete in the Zone League West, the fourth tier of the national league system.

== History ==
The club started competing in the newly formed Serbian League Timok in 1995. They finished as runners-up in the NATO bombing-suspended 1998–99 season and gained promotion to the Second League of FR Yugoslavia. The club spent three seasons in the second tier, competing in Group East from 1999 to 2002. In 2003, they were relegated to the Pomoravlje Zone League, the fourth tier of Serbia and Montenegro football. The club would win the title in the 2004–05 season and earn promotion to the Serbian League East.

Between 2009 and 2019, the club spent 10 consecutive seasons in the Serbian League East. They marked their 80th anniversary in 2018. After placing first in the Zone League West in the COVID-19-interrupted 2019–20 season, the club was promoted back to the third tier of Serbian football.

== Honours ==
Pomoravlje Zone League / Pomoravlje-Timok Zone League / Zone League West (Tier 4)

- 2004–05 / 2008–09 / 2019–20

== Seasons ==
Season	League									Cup
Season	Division	Pld	W	D	L	GF	GA	Pts	Pos	Cup
Serbia and Montenegro
1995–96	3 – Timok	34	21	6	7	57	30	69	3rd	—
1996–97	3 – Timok	34	13	8	13	36	38	47	15th	—
1997–98	3 – Timok	34	15	6	13	71	41	51	6th	—
1998–99	3 – Timok	17 (Note: The season was cut short due to the NATO bombing of Yugoslavia.)	–	–	–	–	–	33	2nd	—
1999–2000	2 – East	32	15	4	13	45	40	49	6th	—
2000–01	2 – East	34	15	2	17	39	48	47	12th	—
2001–02	2 – East	34	5	6	23	33	83	21	16th	—
2002–03	3 – Timok	33	17	0	16	67	64	51	10th	—
2003–04	4 – Pomoravlje	24	10	5	9	70	36	35	12th	—
2004–05	4 – Pomoravlje	34	27	4	3	111	30	85	1st	—
2005–06	3 – East	34	11	5	18	44	52	38	15th	—
Serbia
2006–07	4 – Pomoravlje	30	19	4	7	79	27	61	2nd	—
2007–08	4 – Pomoravlje-Timok	34	19	6	9	63	43	63	3rd	—
2008–09	4 – Pomoravlje-Timok	34	27	2	5	94	30	83	1st	—
2009–10	3 – East	30	20	3	7	48	29	63	3rd	Round of 32
2010–11	3 – East	30	14	4	12	43	44	46	4th	—
2011–12	3 – East	30	15	5	10	44	24	50	2nd	—
2012–13	3 – East	30	11	5	14	52	56	38	11th	—
2013–14	3 – East	30	12	4	14	43	39	40	11th	—
2014–15	3 – East	30	13	3	14	42	44	42	8th	—
2015–16	3 – East	30	10	5	15	40	61	35	13th	—
2016–17	3 – East	30	11	8	11	45	47	41	8th	—
2017–18	3 – East	30	12	5	13	50	49	41	9th	—
2018–19	3 – East	34	8	6	20	39	79	30	17th	—
2019–20	4 – West	17 (Note: The season was cut short due to the COVID-19 pandemic in Serbia.)	15	2	0	69	4	47	1st	—
2020–21	3 – East	38	23	6	9	75	26	75	3rd	—
2021–22	3 – East	28	14	6	8	48	30	48	3rd	—
2022–23	3 – East	30	13	7	10	54	38	46	5th	—
2023–24	3 – East	30	12	3	15	62	51	39	11th	—
2024–25	3 – East	30	7	8	15	44	62	29	15th	—
2025–26	4 – West									—

== Notable players ==
This is a list of players who have played at full international level.

- (Socialist Federal Republic of Yugoslavia) Vladan Radača

For a list of all FK Radnički Svilajnac players with a Wikipedia article, see Category:FK Radnički Svilajnac players.

== Historical list of coaches ==
- (Serbia) Goran Urošević
- (Serbia) Nenad Trailović
- (Serbia) Vladan Radača (2020-2021)
- (Serbia) Vladan Petrović (2021)
- (Serbia) Goran Urošević (2022)
- (Serbia) Zoran Terzić (2022–2024)
- (Serbia) Nenad Trailović (2024–)
