= Bošnjace =

Bošnjace Бошњаце (Serbian)
- Village
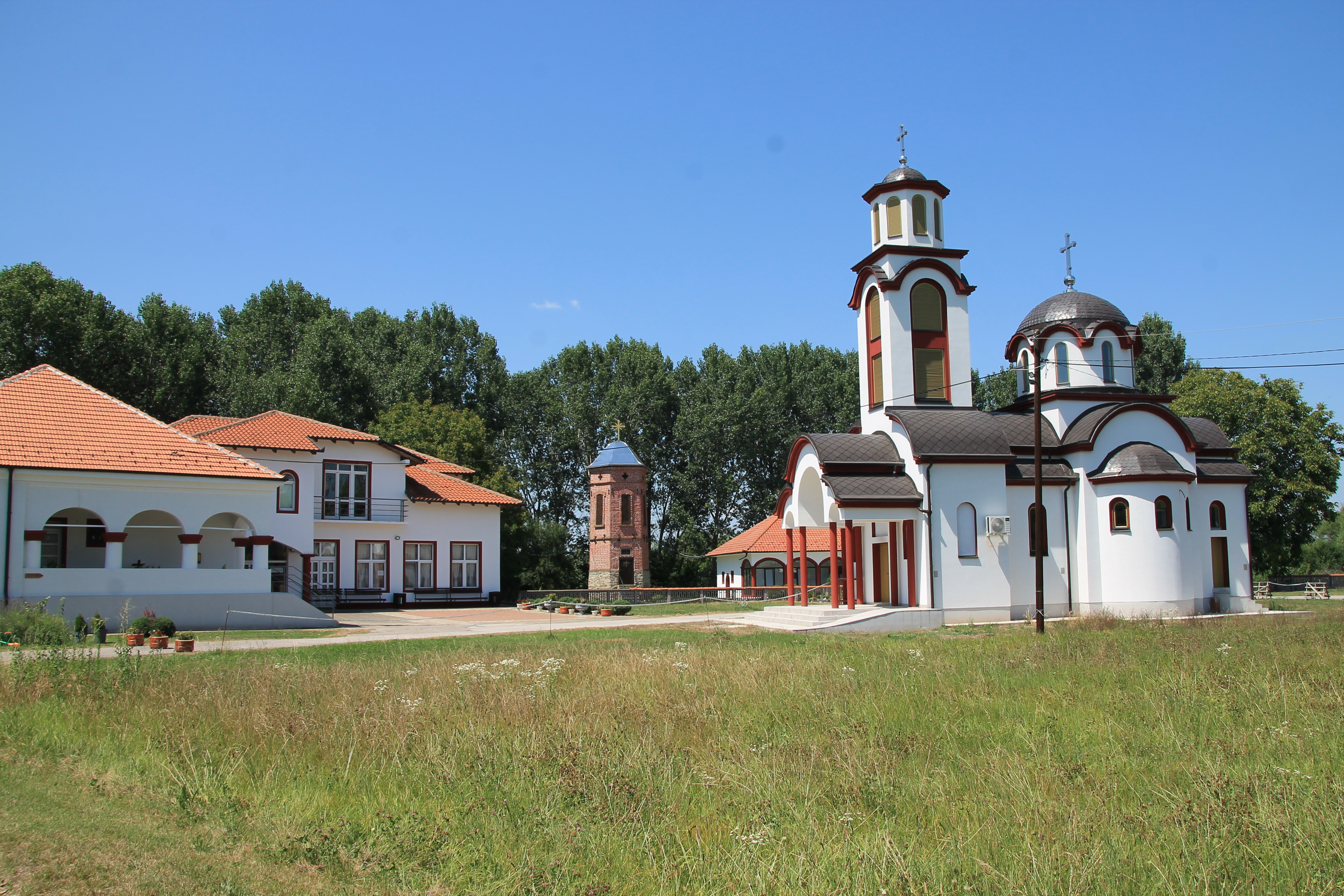

- Location within Serbia
- Coordinates: 42°56′50″N 21°49′34″E
- Country: Serbia
- District: Jablanica District
- Municipality: Lebane

Population (2002)
  - Total: 1,629
- Time zone: UTC+1 (CET)
  - Summer (DST): UTC+2 (CEST)

Bošnjace is a village in the municipality of Lebane, Serbia.

== Census ==
According to the 2002 census, the village has a population of 1629 people.
