= Yumco =

Village and lake in Tibet, China

Coordinates: 31°49′N 84°37′E

Yumco is a village and lake in the Shannan Prefecture Tibet Autonomous Region of China in southern-central Tibet. It lies at an altitude of 4,802 metres (15,757 feet). The village is situated on the lake of the same name.

It lies approximately 21.1 miles south of Dongco.

== See also ==
- List of towns and villages in Tibet
