= Prahovo =

- Village
- Location within Serbia
- Coordinates: 44°17′32″N 22°35′34″E
- Country: Serbia
- District: Bor District
- Municipality: Negotin

Population (2002)
  - Total: 1,506
- Time zone: UTC+1 (CET)
  - Summer (DST): UTC+2 (CEST)

Prahovo is a village on the river Danube in the municipality of Negotin, Serbia with a population of 1506 people at the 2002 census. The battle of Prahovo took place in 1810 near the village during the First Serbian Uprising (1804–1813).

Nearby sections of the river are still crowded with German shipwrecks sunk during the Second World War in late 1944 to block passage to the Soviet military, restricting the navigable channel.

Drought in 2022 dropped river levels and exposed dozens of the sunken warships, still laden with ammunition and explosives, presenting a safety hazard.
