= 2014–15 Serbian League East =

Serbian League East
- Season: 2014-2015
- Champions: Dinamo Vranje
- Promoted: Dinamo Vranje
- Relegated: Kopaonik; Đerdap; Hajduk Veljko
- Matches: 240
- Goals: 677 (2.82 per match)
- Biggest home win: Radnički Pirot 8:1 Hajduk Veljko; Sinđelić Niš 7:0 Sloga Despotovac; Radnički Pirot 7:0 Sloga Despotovac
- Biggest away win: Sloga 2:7 Radnički Pirot
- Highest scoring: Radnički Svilajnac 6:4 Kopaonik

The 2014–15 Serbian League East season. It began on 16 August 2014 and ended on 7 June 2015. Serbian League East is one of four Serbian league in football, which is the third level of football contest in Serbia. League consists of 16 teams. A higher level of competition is the First League, while the lower three Zone League - West, East and South.

== Clubs 2014–15 ==
=== Teams and Stadiums ===
Team	City	Stadium	Capacity
Car Konstantin	Niš	Stadion FK Car Konstantin	5,000
Dinamo	Vranje	Stadion Yumco	5,000
Đerdap	Kladovo	Gradski stadion Kladovo	3,000
Hajduk Veljko	Negotin	Gradski Stadion Negotin	4,000
Kopaonik	Brus	Stadion FK Kopaonik	2,000
OFK Bor	Bor	Stadion kraj Pirita	4,000
Ozren	Sokobanja	Stadion Bata Nole	2,000
Radan	Lebane	Gradski stadion Lebane	3,000
Radnički Pirot	Pirot	Stadion kraj Nišave	13,816
Radnički Svilajnac	Svilajnac	Stadion Bojača	1,000
Sinđelić	Niš	Stadion FK Sinđelić	2,000
Sloga Despotovac	Despotovac	Stadion FK Sloga	3,000
Tabane 1970	Jagodina	Stadion FK Tabane	1,000
Timok	Zaječar	Stadion Kraljevica	10,000
Timočanin	Knjaževac	Gradski stadion Knjaževac	4,000
Trstenik PPT	Trstenik	Gradski Stadion Trstenik	3,000

== League table ==
Pos	Team	Pld	W	D	L	GF	GA	GD	Pts	Promotion or relegation
1	Dinamo Vranje (C, P)	30	21	2	7	57	30	+27	65	Promotion to Serbian First League
2	Radnički Pirot	30	18	5	7	68	25	+43	59	
3	Trstenik PPT	30	15	6	9	51	35	+16	51	
4	Car Konstantin	30	14	6	10	46	37	+9	48	
5	Timok	30	14	6	10	36	27	+9	48	
6	Radan	30	14	6	10	32	26	+6	48	
7	Tabane 1970	30	13	6	11	40	30	+10	45	
8	Radnički Svilajnac	30	13	3	14	42	44	−2	42	
9	OFK Bor	30	13	3	14	46	52	−6	42	
10	Ozren	30	12	3	15	48	43	+5	39	
11	Timočanin	30	13	0	17	36	49	−13	39	
12	Sloga Despotovac	30	11	5	14	36	63	−27	38	
13	Sinđelić Niš	30	10	6	14	40	46	−6	36	
14	Kopaonik (R)	30	10	6	14	33	43	−10	36	Relegation to Zone League
15	Đerdap (R)	30	9	1	20	34	51	−17	28	Relegation to Zone League
16	Hajduk Veljko (R)	30	6	4	20	32	76	−44	22	Relegation to Zone League

(C) Champions; (P) Promoted; (R) Relegated
