= Stadion Dragan Nikolić =

Sports venue in Pirot, Serbia

Coordinates: 43.1517°N 22.5961°E

- Stadion kraj Nišave
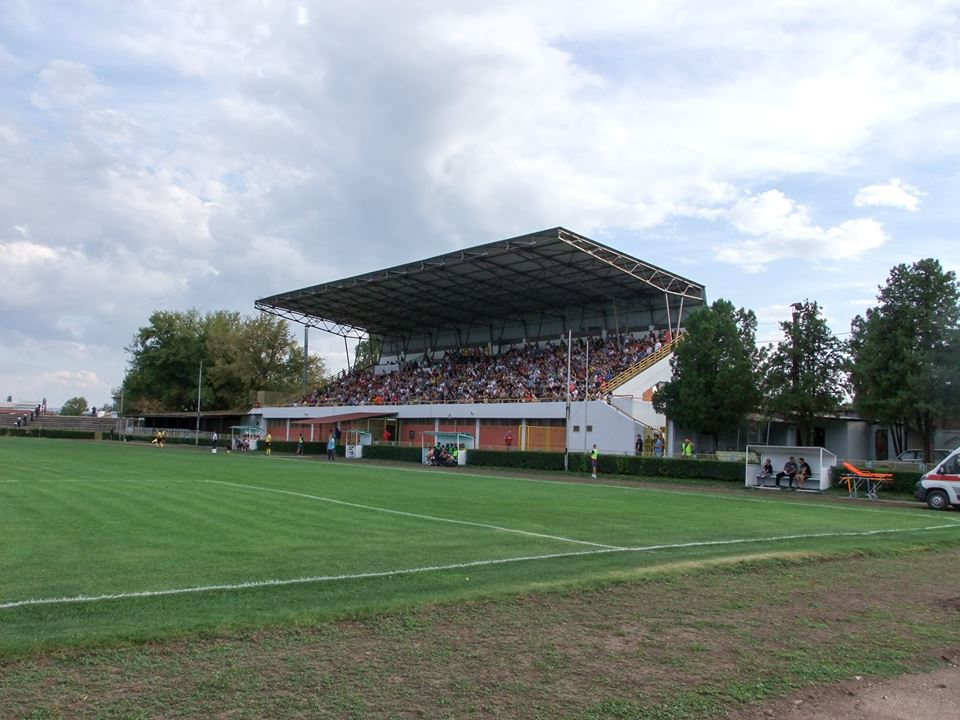
- StadionDraganNikolic
- Interactive map of Stadion Dragan Nikolić
- Location: Pirot, Serbia
- Capacity: 13,816
- Surface: Grass

Construction
- Opened: 1960s
- Expanded: 1980s

Tenants
- Radnički Pirot (Association football); Jedinstvo Pirot (Association football); Vitezovi Pirot (American football)

Stadion Dragan Nikolić, commonly known as Stadion kraj Nišave, is a multi-purpose stadium in Pirot, Serbia. Named after Dragan Nikolić, it is primarily the home venue of football clubs Jedinstvo and Radnički Pirot.

The current capacity of the stadium is 13,816.
