= 2016–17 Serbian First League =

Serbian First League
- Season: 2016–17
- Champions: Mačva
- Promoted: Mačva, Zemun
- Relegated: Kolubara, BSK, OFK Odžaci, OFK Beograd
- Matches played: 240
- Goals scored: 541 (2.25 per match)
- Top goalscorer: Uroš Đerić (Sloboda), 19 goals
- Biggest home win: Radnički 5–1 Dinamo (21 August 2016); Sinđelić 4–0 OFK Beograd (3 September 2016); Zemun 4–0 Radnički (9 April 2017); Sloboda 4–0 Budućnost (13 May 2017)
- Biggest away win: Inđija 1–5 Bežanija (17 May 2017)
- Highest scoring: OFK Beograd 5–2 Kolubara (27 May 2017)

The Serbian First Football League (Serbian: Prva liga Srbije) is the second-highest football league in Serbia. The league is operated by the Serbian FA. 16 teams competed in the league for the 2016–17 season. Two teams were promoted to the Serbian SuperLiga. Four teams were relegated to the Serbian League, the third-highest division overall in the Serbian football league system. Due to extreme financial difficulties, Sloga Petrovac application for 2016–17 season was rejected. On an emergency meeting in the Serbian FA, on 18 July 2016, it was announced that Sloboda Užice would, as a consequence of Sloga's relegation, stay in the league for 2016–17 season. The season begun in August 2016 and ended in May 2017.

== 2016–17 teams ==
Location of teams in the 2016–17 Serbian First league

Team	City	Stadium	Capacity	Kit manufacturer	Shirt Sponsor
Bežanija	Belgrade	Stadion FK Bežanija	4,000	Sportika SA	
BSK Borča	Belgrade	Vizelj Park	2,500	Hummel	
Budućnost Dobanovci	Belgrade	Stadion FK Budućnost	1,000	Legea	
Dinamo Vranje	Vranje	Stadion Yumco	4,000	Nike	
ČSK Čelarevo	Čelarevo	Stadion Pivare	3,000	Joma	Lav pivo
Zemun	Zemun	Zemun Stadium	10,000	Umbro	
Inđija	Inđija	Stadion FK Inđija	4,500	NAAI	
Jagodina	Jagodina	Jagodina City Stadium	15,000	Legea	
Kolubara	Lazarevac	Stadion FK Kolubara	2,000	Erima	Lasta Beograd
Mačva Šabac	Šabac	Stadion FK Mačva	8,000	NAAI	
OFK Beograd	Belgrade	Omladinski Stadium	19,100	Joma	DDOR
OFK Odžaci	Odžaci	Gradski stadion	2,000	NAAI	Vimeksim
Proleter Novi Sad	Novi Sad	Stadion Slana Bara	2,000	NAAI	Elektrovojvodina d.o.o.
Radnički Pirot	Pirot	Stadion Dragan Nikolić	13,816	Umbro	Tigar Tyres
Sinđelić Beograd	Belgrade	Stadion FK Sinđelić	1,500	Unit	Rubikon
Sloboda Užice	Užice	Užice City Stadium	12,000	Jako	UNITRAG

== League table ==
Pos	Team	Pld	W	D	L	GF	GA	GD	Pts	Promotion or relegation
1	Mačva Šabac (Note: Mačva Šabac, BSK Borča, ČSK and Bežanija deducted one point for suspected match fixing.) (C, P)	30	19	6	5	49	26	+23	62	Promotion to the Serbian SuperLiga
2	Zemun (P)	30	17	10	3	44	18	+26	61	Promotion to the Serbian SuperLiga
3	Sloboda Užice	30	15	9	6	43	28	+15	54	
4	Inđija	30	14	6	10	34	30	+4	48	
5	Bežanija	30	12	12	6	36	22	+14	47	
6	Radnički Pirot	30	12	7	11	30	31	−1	43	
7	Jagodina	30	12	5	13	39	35	+4	41	
8	Dinamo Vranje	30	10	9	11	33	43	−10	39	
9	Sinđelić Beograd	30	8	13	9	32	31	+1	37	
10	Budućnost Dobanovci	30	10	7	13	32	43	−11	37	
11	Proleter Novi Sad	30	9	9	12	34	40	−6	36	
12	ČSK	30	8	11	11	31	32	−1	34	
13	Kolubara (R)	30	7	11	12	28	35	−7	32	Relegation to the Serbian League
14	BSK Borča (R)	30	9	6	15	27	39	−12	32	Relegation to the Serbian League
15	OFK Odžaci (R)	30	6	8	16	24	35	−11	26	Relegation to the Serbian League
16	OFK Beograd (R)	30	3	9	18	25	53	−28	18	Relegation to the Serbian League

Source: Football Association of Serbia (in Serbian)
Rules for classification: 1) points; 2) head-to-head points; 3) head-to-head goal difference; 4) head-to-head goals scored; 5) goal difference; 6) number of goals scored.
(C) Champions; (P) Promoted; (R) Relegated

== Results ==
Home \ Away	BEŽ	BSK	BDO	DVR	ČSK	ZEM	INĐ	JAG	KOL	MAČ	OFK	ODŽ	PNS	RPI	SIN	SUŽ
Bežanija		1–1	1–0	2–0	0–0	0–0	0–0	1–0	1–0	2–0	0–0	0–0	3–1	1–0	1–1	4–1
BSK Borča	1–0		3–0	0–0	3–2	0–1	1–2	2–1	1–1	1–3	2–1	2–1	1–2	1–1	1–1	0–2
Budućnost Dobanovci	1–0	0–2		3–0	1–0	0–3	2–0	2–4	0–0	1–3	2–1	1–1	1–1	3–0	1–0	1–1
Dinamo Vranje	1–0	2–0	1–2		2–1	3–3	2–0	2–1	0–0	2–4	1–0	2–0	1–1	3–2	0–0	1–0
ČSK Čelarevo	1–2	1–2	4–2	2–0		0–0	2–0	1–1	0–1	1–0	1–1	2–1	1–0	0–0	0–0	0–0
Zemun	1–1	0–0	3–0	3–0	1–0		1–0	1–0	1–0	1–3	3–0	1–0	1–1	4–0	0–0	2–1
Inđija	1–5	3–1	2–1	2–0	0–0	1–1		2–0	1–0	2–0	3–1	1–0	2–0	0–1	1–1	0–1
Jagodina	1–1	2–0	2–1	1–0	1–1	1–2	0–2		3–0	0–2	3–3	3–0	3–1	1–0	1–0	3–0
Kolubara	1–1	3–0	0–1	1–1	2–0	1–2	1–0	1–1		1–2	3–3	2–0	0–0	3–1	0–0	1–1
Mačva Šabac	1–3	1–0	2–1	2–1	2–2	2–1	1–2	1–0	1–0		3–0	0–0	1–0	1–1	3–0	2–1
OFK Beograd	0–1	0–1	0–0	3–3	0–2	0–2	1–0	1–3	5–2	0–1		0–2	2–2	0–1	1–0	1–3
OFK Odžaci	3–1	1–0	1–1	2–0	2–4	0–0	2–3	2–0	0–1	0–0	0–0		3–1	0–0	1–2	0–1
Proleter Novi Sad	2–1	2–0	2–2	1–2	0–0	1–3	3–1	2–1	4–1	0–2	3–0	1–0		0–1	1–1	0–0
Radnički Pirot	1–0	1–0	1–2	5–1	1–0	1–0	1–1	0–1	1–0	0–3	1–1	2–0	3–0		3–0	0–0
Sinđelić Beograd	1–1	2–0	1–0	1–1	3–1	2–3	0–0	1–0	1–1	2–2	4–0	3–2	0–1	4–1		1–2
Sloboda Užice	2–2	2–1	4–0	1–1	4–2	0–0	1–2	3–1	3–1	1–1	1–0	1–0	3–1	1–0	2–0	

Source: Prva liga
Legend: Blue = home team win; Yellow = draw; Red = away team win.

== Top goalscorers ==
Source: Prva liga official website

Pos	Scorer	Team	Goals
1	(Bosnia and Herzegovina) Uroš Đerić	Sloboda	19
2	(Serbia) Bojan Matić	Mačva	14
3	(Serbia) Nemanja Subotić	Budućnost	13
4	(Serbia) Miroslav Lečić	Jagodina	10
4	(Serbia) Nenad Lukić	Zemun	10
4	(Serbia) Denis Ristov	Radnički	10
7	(Serbia) Stefan Dimić	Zemun	9
7	(Serbia) Mladen Lazarević	Mačva	9
7	(Serbia) Milan Mirosavljev	Proleter	9
7	(Serbia) Lazar Tufegdžić	OFK Beograd / Sinđelić	9

=== Own goals ===
Player	For	Game	Date
(Serbia) Lazar Tufegdžić (OFK Beograd)	OFK Odžaci	OFK Beograd – OFK Odžaci 0:2	13 August 2016
(Serbia) Draško Đorđević (Bežanija)	BSK	BSK – Bežanija 1:0	17 September 2016
(Serbia) Nikola Jaćimović (Budućnost)	Proleter	Budućnost – Proleter 1:1	13 November 2016
(Serbia) Mladen Lazarević (Mačva)	Sinđelić	Sinđelić – Mačva 2:2	29 April 2017
(Serbia) Milan Joksimović (Sloboda)	Bežanija	Bežanija – Sloboda 4:1	27 May 2017

=== Hat-tricks ===
Player	For	Against	Result	Date
(Serbia) Miroslav Lečić	Jagodina	Kolubara	3:0	11 March 2017
(Serbia) Nemanja Subotić	Budućnost	Dinamo	3:0	29 April 2017
(Serbia) Stefan Dimić	Zemun	OFK Beograd	3:0	13 May 2017
(Serbia) Lazar Vladisavljević	Budućnost	Radnički	3:0	27 May 2017
