= FK Radnički Pirot =

Serbian football club

Radnički Pirot
- Full name: FK Radnički Pirot
- Nickname: Beli (The Whites)
- Founded: 1945; 81 years ago
- Ground: Stadion Dragan Nikolić
- Capacity: 13,816
- President: Gvozden Ignjatović
- Head coach: Ivica Momčilović
- League: Serbian League East
- 2024–25: Serbian League East, 2nd of 16
Home colours	Away colours

FK Radnički Pirot (Serbian Cyrillic: ФК Раднички Пирот) is a football club based in Pirot, Serbia. They compete in the Serbian League East, the third tier of the national league system.

== History ==
The club was founded immediately after World War II in 1945. They made their Yugoslav Second League debut in the 1969–70 campaign. Over the next 12 seasons, the club competed in the second tier of Yugoslav football, before being relegated in 1981. They were promoted back the following year and played another six seasons in the Second League (1982–1988), before the competition was reorganized. In the 1975–76 Yugoslav Cup, the club made one of the greatest accomplishments in its history by eliminating Red Star Belgrade to reach the quarter-finals, eventually losing to Dinamo Zagreb.

Following the dissolution of SFR Yugoslavia, the club competed in the newly formed Second League of FR Yugoslavia in the 1992–93 season, but failed to avoid relegation. They returned to the second tier three years later and subsequently placed third in Group East in their comeback appearance. However, the club suffered relegation to the third tier in 1998.

In the new millennium, the club surprisingly reached the quarter-finals of the 2004–05 Serbia and Montenegro Cup, being eliminated by Rad after losing 1–0 at home. They also earned promotion to the Serbian First League in the same season by winning the Serbian League East. The club spent the next three seasons in the second tier of Serbian football, before being relegated back to the Serbian League East in 2008. In the meantime, they achieved another success in the national cup by reaching the 2006–07 Serbian Cup quarter-finals, but lost 2–1 to Vojvodina at home.

After spending eight consecutive seasons in the Serbian League East, the club was promoted as champions to the Serbian First League in 2016. They were relegated back to the third tier in 2018, only to return to the second tier in 2019.

== Honours ==
- Serbian League Timok / Serbian League Niš / Serbian League East (Tier 3)
  - Champions (5): 1995–96, 2000–01, 2004–05, 2015–16, 2018–19

== Seasons ==
Season	League									Cup
Season	Division	Pld	W	D	L	GF	GA	Pts	Pos	Cup
Serbia and Montenegro
1992–93	2	38	13	4	21	41	74	30	18th	—
1993–94	3 – East	34	16	12	6	70	45	44	4th	—
1994–95	3 – East	34	20	5	9	83	37	65	2nd	—
1995–96	3 – Timok	34	27	2	5	100	23	83	1st	—
1996–97	2 – East	34	17	11	6	56	41	62	3rd	—
1997–98	2 – East	34	16	3	15	45	59	51	13th	—
1998–99	3 – Niš	17 (Note: The season was cut short due to the NATO bombing of Yugoslavia.)	–	–	–	–	–	29	5th	—
1999–2000	3 – Niš	38	19	7	12	105	59	64	3rd	—
2000–01	3 – Niš	33	17	9	7	83	45	60	1st	—
2001–02	2 – East	34	16	7	11	63	45	55	6th	—
2002–03	2 – East	33	13	6	14	52	57	45	8th	Round of 16
2003–04	2 – East	36	16	6	14	54	45	54	8th	—
2004–05	3 – East	34	23	6	5	114	33	75	1st	Quarter-finals
2005–06	2 – Serbia	38	13	7	18	50	52	46	13th	—
Serbia
2006–07	2	38	17	8	13	52	36	59	6th	Quarter-finals
2007–08	2	34	1	6	27	16	55	9	18th	Round of 32
2008–09	3 – East	28	9	5	14	22	30	32	10th	Preliminary round
2009–10	3 – East	30	13	4	13	53	40	43	4th	—
2010–11	3 – East	30	16	4	10	51	34	52	2nd	—
2011–12	3 – East	30	10	10	10	34	30	40	10th	—
2012–13	3 – East	30	19	4	7	46	14	61	3rd	—
2013–14	3 – East	30	15	3	12	44	32	48	4th	—
2014–15	3 – East	30	18	5	7	68	25	59	2nd	—
2015–16	3 – East	30	19	9	2	54	20	66	1st	—
2016–17	2	30	12	7	11	30	31	43	6th	—
2017–18	2	30	8	7	15	28	39	31	13th	Round of 16
2018–19	3 – East	34	27	4	3	96	19	85	1st	Round of 32
2019–20	2	30 (Note: The season was shortened due to the COVID-19 pandemic in Serbia.)	12	7	11	34	33	43	6th	—
2020–21	2	34	10	9	15	32	46	39	11th	Round of 32
2021–22	3 – East	28	14	5	9	62	31	47	4th	Preliminary round
2022–23	3 – East	30	21	4	5	66	27	67	2nd	—
2023–24	3 – East	30	16	2	12	61	43	50	4th	—
2024–25	3 – East	30	17	7	6	56	31	58	2nd	—
2025–26	3 – East	30	13	6	11	59	50	45	7th	—
2026–27	3 – East									—

== Supporters ==
The club's main supporters' group is known as Pirgosi. They were founded in the summer of 1990. The group is traditionally situated in the east stand of the stadium.

== Notable players ==
This is a list of players who have played at full international level.

- (Serbia) Nikola Đurđić
- (Serbia) Andrija Kaluđerović
- (Serbia and Montenegro) Ivan Gvozdenović
- (Serbia and Montenegro) Nenad Jestrović
- (Serbia and Montenegro) Mateja Kežman
- (Serbia and Montenegro) Radivoje Manić
- (Serbia and Montenegro) Zoran Ranković
- (Serbia and Montenegro) Jovan Stanković
- (Socialist Federal Republic of Yugoslavia) Jovan Anđelković

For a list of all FK Radnički Pirot players with a Wikipedia article, see Category:FK Radnički Pirot players.

== Historical list of coaches ==
Period	Name
2005	(Serbia and Montenegro) Čeda Matić
2005–2006	(Serbia and Montenegro) Marjan Živković
2006	(Serbia and Montenegro) Vladimir Jocić
2006–2007	(Serbia) Nebojša Vignjević
2007	(Bosnia and Herzegovina) Cvijetin Blagojević
2007	(Serbia) Zoran Nikolić
2007	(Serbia) Miloš Joksić
2008	(Serbia) Čeda Matić
2008	(Serbia) Ljubomir Veljković
2009	(Serbia) Goran Cvetković

Period	Name
2009	(Serbia) Slobodan Đošev
2009	(Serbia) Marjan Živković
2010	(Serbia) Slobodan Đošev
2010–2011	(Serbia) Vojkan Aleksić
2011–2012	(Serbia) Radivoje Manić
2012	(North Macedonia) Milan Stojanoski
2012–2013	(Serbia) Mile Tomić
2013–2014	(Serbia) Aleksandar Kuzmanović
2014–2015	(Serbia) Vojkan Aleksić
2015–2017	(Serbia) Marjan Živković

Period	Name
2017	(Serbia) Dražen Dukić
2017–2018	(Serbia) Goran Lazarević
2018	(Serbia) Aleksandar Kuzmanović
2018–2019	(Serbia) Marko Vidojević
2019–2020	(Serbia) Dejan Čelar
2020–2021	(Serbia) Nikola Puača
2021	(Serbia) Dragan Perišić
2021–2022	(Serbia) Marko Vidojević
2022–2024	(Serbia) Goran Lazarević
2024–2025	(Serbia) Boban Stanković

Period	Name
2026–	(Serbia) Ivica Momčilović
