= FK Car Konstantin =

Car Konstantin
- Full name: Fudbalski Klub Car Konstantin
- Nickname: Carevi (The Czars)
- Founded: 24 August 1932; 93 years ago
- Ground: Car Konstantin Ground, Niš
- Capacity: 8,000
- Chairman: Miroslav Milivojević
- Manager: Dobrivoje Đurđević
- League: Zone League Centre
- 2024-25: Zone League Centre, 2nd
Home colours	Away colours

FK Car Konstantin (Serbian Cyrillic: ФК Цар Константин) is a football club based in Niš, Serbia.

The clubs competes in the 2025–26 season in the Zone League Centre, 4th national tier.

== History ==
=== Name origin ===
The name comes in honour of the Roman Emperor Constantine the Great that was born precisely in Niš, then called Naisus. He was the first Roman Emperor to accept Christianity initiating the expansion of the faith throughout the "civilized world".

The neighbouring areas of Bubanj, Ledena stena and the Rail station were formed mostly by the railway workers. From 1860 on the railway workers chosen as the traditional Serbian slava (the celebration of a patron Saint) the St. Emperor Constantin and Empress Helena and celebrated on 3 June each year. The club was formed following the tradition of the Railway workers musical and singing society "Konstantin" formed in 1893.

=== Club formation ===
The club was officially formed on 24 August 1932 in the hotel "Atina" in the proximity of the railway station. After Sinđelić, Pobeda, Železničar, Građanski and Jugoslavija, Car Konstantin becomes the 6th football club in the city of Niš. The club founders were the population of the suburban area of Bubanj and Ledena stena, and the employees and workers of the railway station, "Car Konstantin" typography and the commercial cooperative society "Eparhija Niška" located in Niš since 1925.

=== SK Car Konstantin (1932–1944) ===
The club soon begins playing matches against other city clubs and other clubs from Serbia. The club in this period won twice the Niš subassociation championship. The main player was Dimitrije "Mita" Belić.

=== Recent league history ===
Season	Division	P	W	D	L	F	A	Pts	Pos
2020–21	Serbian League East	38	18	4	16	82	59	58	11th
2021–22	Zone League Centre	30	27	2	1	88	25	83	1st
2022–23	Serbian League East	30	1	1	28	22	83	4	16th
2023–24	Zone League Centre	30	13	5	12	90	85	44	9th
2024–25	Zone League Centre	22	12	5	5	56	29	41	2nd

== Players ==
For the list of former and current players with Wikipedia article, please see: Category:FK Car Konstantin players.
