= 2013–14 Serbian League East =

Serbian League East
- Season: 2013–14
- Champions: Moravac Mrštane
- Promoted: Moravac Mrštane
- Relegated: Dubočica; Žitorađa; Jedinstvo Paraćin

The 2013–14 Serbian League East season was the eleventh season of the league under its current title.
