= Svilajnac =

Svilajnac Свилајнац (Serbian)
- Town and municipality
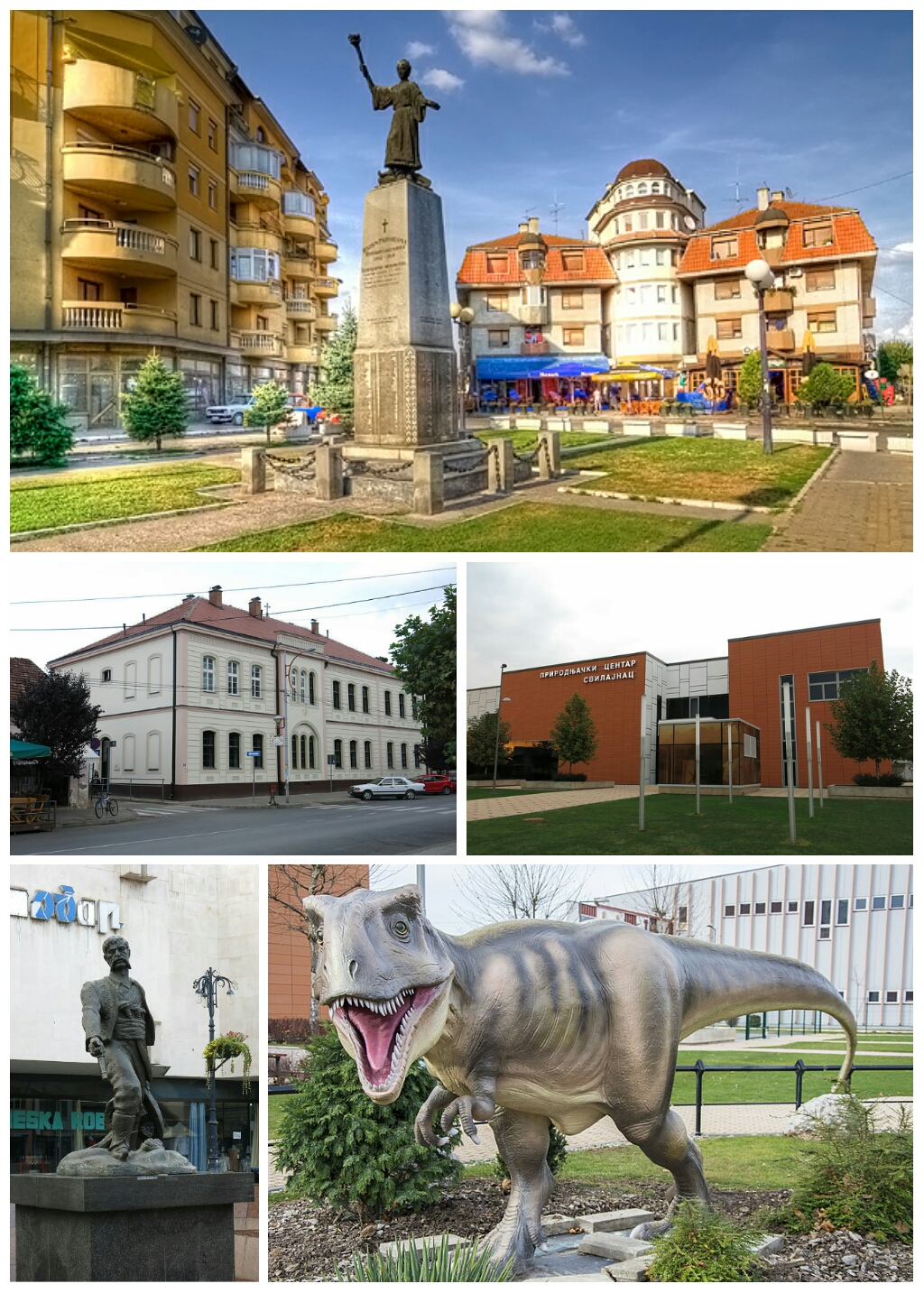
- Svilajnac- collage of image (Mara Resavkinja square, High School, Natural History Center Svilajnac, Stevan Sinđelić monument, Statue of a tyrannosaurus in a natural history center)

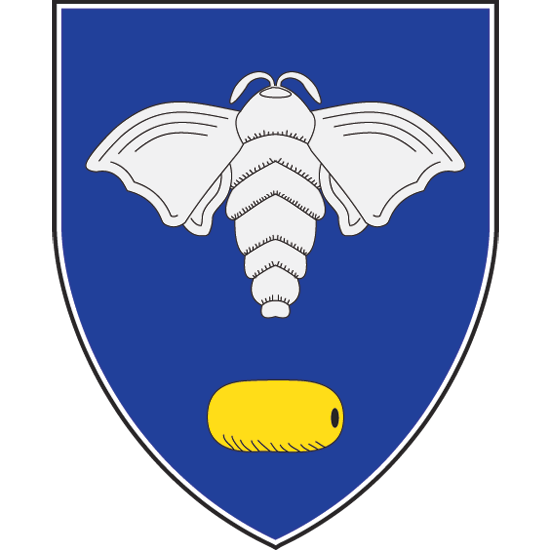
- Coat of arms

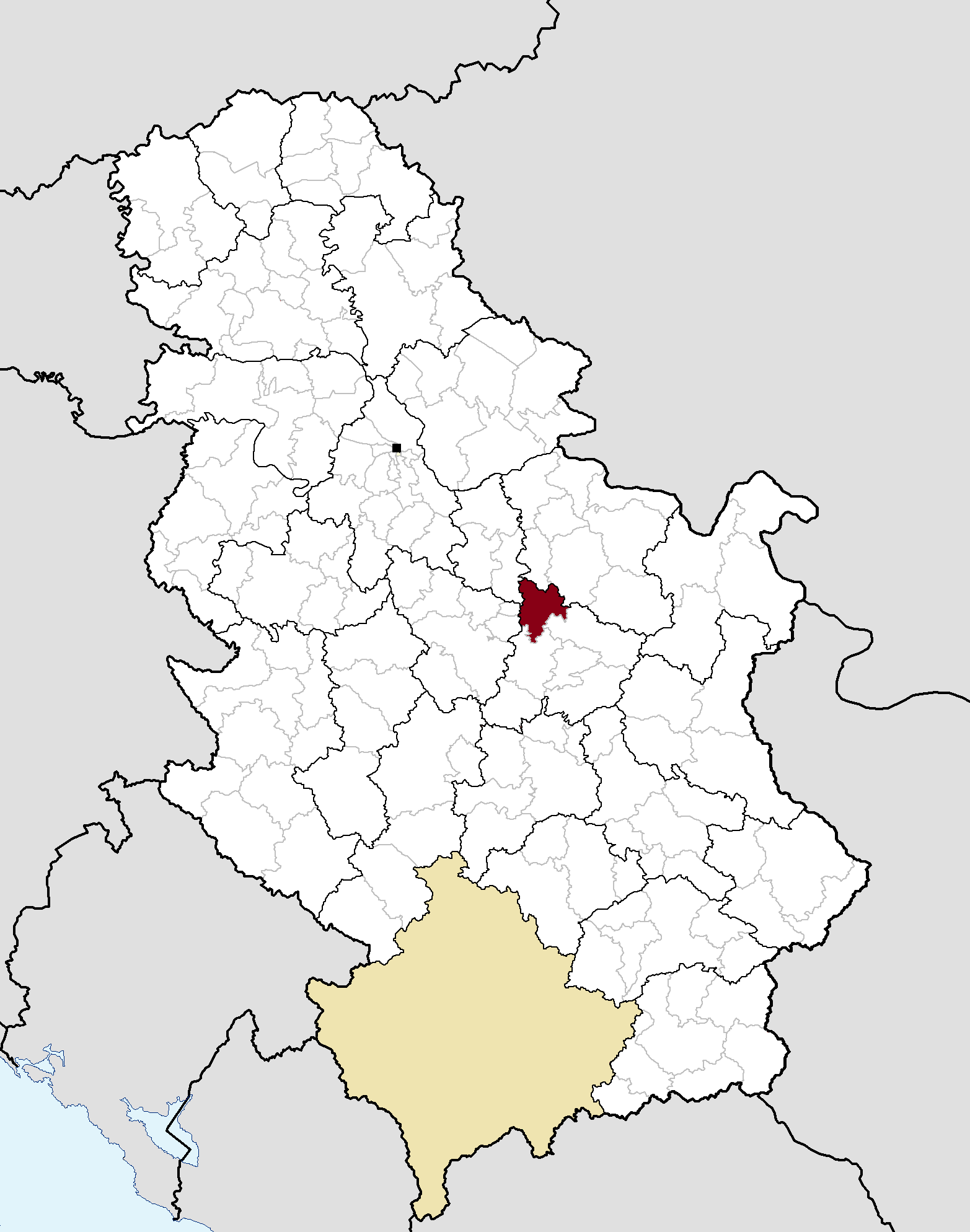
- Location of the municipality of Svilajnac within Serbia
- Coordinates: 44°14′08″N 21°11′47″E
- Country: Serbia
- Region: Šumadija and Western Serbia
- District: Pomoravlje
- Settlements: 22

Government
  - Mayor: Predrag Milanović (Ind.)

Area
  - Town: 28 km^{2} (11 sq mi)
  - Municipality: 326 km^{2} (126 sq mi)
- Elevation: 100 m (330 ft)

Population (2022 census)
  - Town: 8,593
  - Municipality: 20,141
- Time zone: UTC+1 (CET)
  - Summer (DST): UTC+2 (CEST)
- Postal code: 35210
- Area code: +381(0)35
- Car plates: SV
- Website: www.svilajnac.rs

Svilajnac (Serbian Cyrillic: Свилајнац, pronounced [sviːlaɪnʌt͡s]) is a town and municipality located in the Pomoravlje District of central Serbia. The population of the town is 8,593 inhabitants, while the municipality has 20,141 inhabitants (2022 census).

It is located 100 km (62 mi) south-east of Belgrade, on the banks of the river Resava, and bordering the river Morava. Its name stems from the word for silk in Serbian.

== History ==
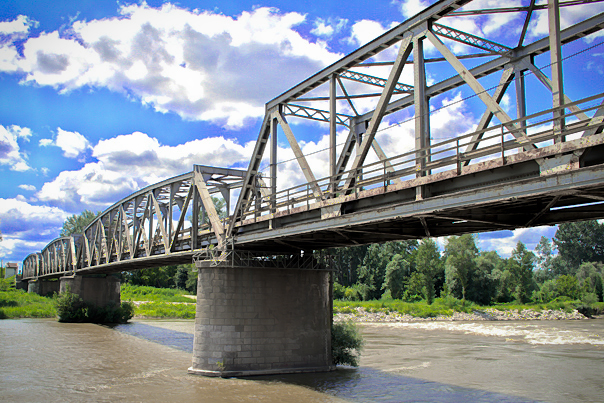
The Velika Morava Bridge

Svilajnac was first mentioned in Ottoman records in 1467 as a village with a hundred households. The village, and later town, gained prominence through its silk production, from which it derives its name (svila, "silk"). Located in central Serbia, it flourished as a trading center, where silk, wool and livestock were traded.

The First Serbian Uprising revolutionary Stevan Sinđelić was born in the village of Grabovac near Svilajnac. His birth house serves as an exhibition space with a display depicting the period of the First Serbian Uprising, including original furniture from this region. A statue in his honor was raised in the central square of Svilajnac, in the pedestrian zone of Kriva čaršija. It was erected in 1991 after the design of sculptor Mihailo Paunović. The bronze monument marks the decisive moment in the Battle of Čegar, when Sinđelić, standing in the trench shot the powder keg.

In 1832 a hospital was established in Svilajnac, one of the first medical centers in this part of Serbia. Due to its architectural and historical importance, the building of the Old Hospital has been declared a cultural monument and placed under the state protection.

Modern town began to develop on the location of the medieval village in 1820. It was based on the urban regulatory plan which consisted of four main streets: Prava čaršija (today Saint Sava Street), Kriva čaršija, Gospodska (today Ustanička Street) and Resava Square (today Park of the European friendship). Kriva čaršija is one of the best preserved ambient units in the town. It was later called Kneza Mihailova, then Lenjinova after the World War II, then Stevana Sinđelića before its original name was returned. Today it is the central pedestrian zone in Svilajnac.

On 29 June 1866 Prince Mihailo Obrenović officially declared Svliajnac a varošica ("small town"). In 1868 a library was open. The building previously belonged to Dimitrije Mita Isaković, founder of the Resava Savings Bank, the first money institution in Svilajnac. The building was declared a cultural monument in 2001 and the library today holds 60,000 books and 9,000 non-book units. A gymnasium was open in 1877. The school building was also declared a cultural monument and was fully renovated in 2015.

In 1923 it was decided to erect the monument in honor of the soldiers from Svilajnac, killed in the Balkan Wars and World War I from 1912 to 1918. The foundation stone was laid in 1923 and the monument was dedicated on 27 October 1926. The monument was designed by Slovene sculptor Ivan Zajec and the model for the bronze sculpture was a local woman Zora Milosavljević Bidžić. There are several stories on her identity. A mythical ones, claim that Mara was a fighter in the Resava region against the Ottoman invasion in 14th century or a daughter of legendary Jug Bogdan who became a nun with her mother after the Battle of Kosovo in 1389. One of the plausible stories mentions Mara, a daughter of Kosovo migrant Joksa Resavac, from the period of the First Serbian Uprising, who fought the Turks with Sinđelić and the Resava knez Petar Jakovljević Erčić. Soon a cult of Mara Resavkinja developed and she was considered a symbol of maternity, freedom and life, with numerous songs being written about her. The monument shows Mara holding a torch in the right hand and laurel wreath in the left. Under her feet are the trumpet and a drum, symbols of monarchy. Because of this, a representative of the King Alexander on the monument's dedication left the ceremony. Due to this symbolism, the monument was attacked and finally in 1934 it was decided to demolish it. Actually, mayor of Svilajnac Mihajlo R. Milenković officially pleaded for the figure to be replaced with some other, "more appropriate", so the demolition was announced on 3 October 1934, but ban of the Morava Banovina nullified the decision of the town's administration on 26 October. King Alexander was assassinated in the meantime (9 October), situation in the state became unstable, followed by the breakout of the World War II, so the monument survived. However, it was destroyed during the World War II. The local Četniks' unit knocked down the bronze figure and melted it into the hand grenades. After the war, citizens decided to rebuild the monument. Sculptor Lojze Dolinar used the surviving Zajec's molds to cast the identical figure which was unveiled on 29 November 1951.

From 1929 to 1941, Svilajnac was part of the Morava Banovina of the Kingdom of Yugoslavia. During the Interbellum a building of the Sokol Hall "Dušan Silni" was constructed. It was reconstructed in 2012 and adapted into the cultural center.

One of the largest buildings in town is the Agricultural and veterinary school, with the campus "Svilajnac", built in 1957. After the liberalisation of international travel in SFR Yugoslavia significant number of residents of the town moved to Paris as guest workers.

On 3 September 2007 there was a Democratic Party initiative to depose the president of the municipality Dobrivoje Budimirović "Bidža" (Serbian Radical Party). It failed, partially due to the opposition of the Democratic Party of Serbia.

The town was damaged during the 2014 Southeast Europe floods.

In 2015 a Natural History Center of Serbia, 3,000 m^{2} (32,000 sq ft), was open in Svilajnac. It became a major tourist attraction in the entire region, mostly due to its exhibition of dinosaur remains in the Dino Park. The center is located close to the downtown and the Kriva čaršija. Out of 20 dinosaur replicas, the largest is Diplodocus, 11 m (36 ft) tall and 20 m (66 ft) long.

== Demographics ==
Historical population
Year	Pop.	±% p.a.
1948	33,268	—
1953	33,969	+0.42%
1961	33,677	−0.11%
1971	34,256	+0.17%
1981	34,888	+0.18%
1991	33,136	−0.51%
2002	25,511	−2.35%
2011	23,551	−0.88%
2022	20,141	−1.41%

As of 2022 census, the municipality of Svilajnac has 20,141 inhabitants.

== Economy ==
Apart from commercial services, Svilajnac's economy is largely dependent on agricultural activities. Svilajnac has developed two fully equipped industrial zones. One of the facilities is of Panasonic since 2011.

During the existence of SFR Yugoslavia, the state-owned companies contributed substantially to the local economy, until the 1990s, when international sanctions imposed on FR Yugoslavia lead to the massive closure of the companies.

As of September 2017, Svilajnac has one of 14 free economic zones established in Serbia.

Economic preview

The following table gives a preview of total number of registered people employed in legal entities per their core activity (as of 2018):

Activity	Total
Agriculture, forestry and fishing	57
Mining and quarrying	7
Manufacturing	1,317
Electricity, gas, steam and air conditioning supply	153
Water supply; sewerage, waste management and remediation activities	71
Construction	121
Wholesale and retail trade, repair of motor vehicles and motorcycles	1,221
Transportation and storage	143
Accommodation and food services	314
Information and communication	51
Financial and insurance activities	72
Real estate activities	9
Professional, scientific and technical activities	148
Administrative and support service activities	94
Public administration and defense; compulsory social security	266
Education	385
Human health and social work activities	310
Arts, entertainment and recreation	50
Other service activities	114
Individual agricultural workers	817
Total	5,720

== Infrastructure ==
One of only several bridges across the Morava is located in Svilajnac, giving it a unique strategic value. During the Second World War, the original bridge was destroyed by the retreating Royal Yugoslav Army. After the war, the bridge was rebuilt with German war reparations.

Svilajnac is also the location of a coal-fired power plant TPP Morava. Built in 1969, only several hundred meters upriver from the bridge, it has an energy output of 108 MW. The town is also the location to now decommissioned military barracks which could house up to 5,000 soldiers at any one time.

== Sports ==
Local football club Radnički has competed in the second tier of Serbian football.

== Notable people ==
- Stevan Sinđelić (1771–1809)
- Andra Gavrilović (1864–1929)
- Miloš Savčić (1865–1941)
- Darko F. Ribnikar (1878–1914)

== Twin towns ==
- Kanjiža (Serbia)
- Radovljica (Slovenia)
- Drancy (France)

== See also ==
- Šumadija
- Pomoravlje
- Resava
- List of cities in Serbia
- Dublje (Svilajnac)
- Grabovac (Svilajnac)
