= List of Serbian football transfers winter 2019–20 =

- This is a list of transfers in Serbian football for the 2019–20 winter transfer window.
- Moves featuring Serbian SuperLiga and Serbian First League sides are listed.
- The order by which the clubs are listed is equal to the classification at the mid-season of the 2019–20 season.

== Serbian SuperLiga ==
=== Red Star Belgrade ===
In: Note: Flags indicate national team as defined under FIFA eligibility rules; some limited exceptions apply. Players may hold more than one non-FIFA nationality.

No.	Pos.	Nation	Player
24	MF	SRB	Željko Gavrić (loan return from Grafičar Beograd)
33	DF	SRB	Marko Konatar (loan return from Grafičar Beograd)
35	MF	CIV	Sékou Sanogo (on loan from (Saudi Arabia) Al-Ittihad)
—	MF	GHA	Ibrahim Mustapha (from (Ghana) EurAfrica, to youth team)
—	FW	SLO	Vanja Panić (from (Slovenia) Olimpija Ljubljana, to youth team)

Out: Note: Flags indicate national team as defined under FIFA eligibility rules; some limited exceptions apply. Players may hold more than one non-FIFA nationality.

No.	Pos.	Nation	Player
10	MF	GER	Marko Marin (to (Saudi Arabia) Al-Ahli)
27	GK	SRB	Nikola Vasiljević (on loan to Radnik Surdulica)
30	MF	SRB	Miloš Pantović (on loan to Grafičar Beograd)
32	GK	SRB	Aleksandar Stanković (on loan to Napredak Kruševac)
33	MF	SRB	Milan Jevtović (on loan to (Cyprus) APOEL)
36	MF	SVK	Erik Jirka (on loan to (Poland) Górnik Zabrze, was on loan at Radnički Niš)
51	GK	SRB	Miloš Gordić (on loan to Mačva Šabac, was on loan at Grafičar Beograd)
99	FW	MNE	Nikola Krstović (on loan to Grafičar Beograd)
—	GK	SRB	Miloš Čupić (on loan to Grafičar Beograd, was on loan at Zlatibor Čajetina)
—	MF	KEN	Richard Odada (on loan to Grafičar Beograd)
—	MF	SRB	Stefan Cvetković (on loan to Grafičar Beograd, was on loan at Čukarički)
—	MF	SRB	Edin Ajdinović (was on loan, now signed at Voždovac)
—	FW	SRB	Uroš Milovanović (on loan to Grafičar Beograd)
—	FW	SRB	Dejan Vidić (on loan to Napredak Kruševac, was on loan at Grafičar Beograd)
—	FW	MKD	Strahinja Krstevski (to (Georgia (country)) Samtredia, was on loan at (North Macedonia) Rabotnički)
—	FW	SRB	Marko Dedijer (to Rad)
—	GK	SRB	Luka Savić (to Sloboda Užice)
—	MF	SRB	Mihailo Đorđević (to OFK Beograd)
—	MF	SRB	Miloš Nikolić (on loan to Sinđelić Beograd, was on loan at Grafičar Beograd)

=== Partizan ===
In: Note: Flags indicate national team as defined under FIFA eligibility rules; some limited exceptions apply. Players may hold more than one non-FIFA nationality.

No.	Pos.	Nation	Player
3	DF	SRB	Strahinja Pavlović (on loan from (France) Monaco, previously sold to same club)
91	FW	SRB	Bojan Matić (from Vojvodina)
9	FW	NGR	Umar Sadiq (was on loan, now signed from (Italy) Roma)
15	DF	SRB	Uroš Vitas (from (Kazakhstan) Irtysh Pavlodar)

Out: Note: Flags indicate national team as defined under FIFA eligibility rules; some limited exceptions apply. Players may hold more than one non-FIFA nationality.

No.	Pos.	Nation	Player
12	GK	SRB	Filip Kljajić (to (Japan) Omiya Ardija)
4	DF	SRB	Miroslav Vulićević (retired)
2	DF	MNE	Periša Pešukić (on loan to (Montenegro) Budućnost Podgorica)
—	MF	SRB	Aleksa Janković (to Voždovac, was on loan at Teleoptik)
—	FW	SRB	Miloš Milivojević (to Čukarički)
45	FW	SRB	Petar Gigić (on loan to Mačva Šabac)
17	DF	SRB	Zlatan Šehović (on loan to (Israel) Maccabi Netanya)
—	MF	MNE	Nikša Vujanović (to Spartak Subotica)
90	MF	SRB	Strahinja Jovanović (to Spartak Subotica)
14	MF	SRB	Ivan Milosavljević (on loan to Voždovac, was on loan at Teleoptik)
—	DF	SRB	Nikola Mirić (to Vojvodina)
—	FW	SRB	Nemanja Nikolić (on loan to Spartak Subotica, was on loan at Vojvodina)
—	DF	SRB	Ivan Ćorković (on loan to Teleoptik)
—	DF	SRB	Luka Cucin (on loan to Inđija, was on loan at Spartak Subotica)
67	DF	SRB	Dominik Dinga (loan return to (Russia) Ural Yekaterinburg)
21	MF	NOR	Moussa Njie (released, was on loan at (Norway) Odd)
—	DF	SRB	Adnan Islamović (to (Croatia) Novigrad)
7	MF	SRB	Zoran Tošić (to (China) Taizhou Yuanda)

=== Vojvodina ===
In: Note: Flags indicate national team as defined under FIFA eligibility rules; some limited exceptions apply. Players may hold more than one non-FIFA nationality.

No.	Pos.	Nation	Player
90	MF	SRB	Miljan Vukadinović (from Napredak Kruševac)
41	DF	SRB	Lazar Stojsavljević (free, last with (England) Newport County)
15	DF	SRB	Nikola Andrić (from Mladost Lučani)
16	DF	SRB	Nikola Mirić (from Partizan)
23	FW	BIH	Momčilo Mrkaić (from Javor Ivanjica)
22	MF	SRB	Bogdan Mladenović (from (Portugal) Gil Vicente)
11	DF	SRB	Stefan Đorđević (from Radnički Niš)
—	DF	ROU	Constantin Nica (from (Romania) Voluntari)
—	DF	SRB	Marko Bjeković (loan return from Kabel)
29	DF	CRO	Slavko Bralić (from (Greece) AEL)

Out: Note: Flags indicate national team as defined under FIFA eligibility rules; some limited exceptions apply. Players may hold more than one non-FIFA nationality.

No.	Pos.	Nation	Player
55	MF	SLO	Željko Filipović (released)
13	DF	SRB	Nikola Petković (released)
22	FW	SRB	Nemanja Nikolić (loan return to Partizan)
—	DF	SRB	Andrej Jakovljević (to Javor Ivanjica)
9	FW	SRB	Bojan Matić (to Partizan)
93	FW	NGR	Eze Vincent Okeuhie (to Čukarički)
—	MF	MNE	Petar Pavlićević (on loan to Kabel, previously bought from (Portugal) Benfica)
11	DF	SRB	Nemanja Vučić (to Voždovac)
2	DF	SRB	Milan Lazarević (to Rad)
33	DF	SRB	Ranko Veselinović (on loan to (Canada) Vancouver Whitecaps)
5	DF	SRB	Nikola Vasiljević (to Kolubara)
4	MF	SRB	Marko Đurišić (to (Latvia) Riga)

=== Čukarički ===
In: Note: Flags indicate national team as defined under FIFA eligibility rules; some limited exceptions apply. Players may hold more than one non-FIFA nationality.

No.	Pos.	Nation	Player
—	FW	SRB	Miloš Milivojević (from Partizan)
27	MF	BIH	Milan Savić (from (Belgium) Mechelen)
9	FW	SRB	Slobodan Tedić (on loan from (England) Manchester City, previously sold to same club)
93	FW	NGR	Eze Vincent Okeuhie (from Vojvodina)
25	FW	SRB	Luka Zorić (from IMT)
17	FW	COL	Dilan Ortiz (on loan from (Colombia) Atlético Nacional)

Out: Note: Flags indicate national team as defined under FIFA eligibility rules; some limited exceptions apply. Players may hold more than one non-FIFA nationality.

No.	Pos.	Nation	Player
8	MF	SRB	Luka Luković (to Javor Ivanjica)
7	FW	NED	Mink Peeters (to (Netherlands) Volendam)
25	DF	SRB	Đorđe Šošević (Sinđelić Beograd)
17	MF	SRB	Stefan Cvetković (loan return to Red Star Belgrade)
18	FW	GHA	Vilson Kwame Owusu (released)
35	GK	SRB	Novak Mićović (on loan to IMT)
11	FW	SRB	Marko Šarić (on loan to Radnički Pirot)
49	MF	MNE	Bojica Nikčević (on loan to Radnički Pirot)
88	FW	SRB	Viktor Lukić (to Radnik Surdulica)
32	FW	SRB	Kosta Aleksić (on loan to Napredak Kruševac)
23	DF	SRB	Miroslav Bogosavac (on loan to (Russia) Akhmat Grozny)
22	MF	SRB	Luka Stojanović (to (United States) Chicago Fire)

=== TSC ===
In: Note: Flags indicate national team as defined under FIFA eligibility rules; some limited exceptions apply. Players may hold more than one non-FIFA nationality.

No.	Pos.	Nation	Player
10	FW	SRB	Đuro Zec (from Napredak Kruševac)
16	MF	SRB	Vasilije Đurić (from Sinđelić Beograd)

Out: Note: Flags indicate national team as defined under FIFA eligibility rules; some limited exceptions apply. Players may hold more than one non-FIFA nationality.

No.	Pos.	Nation	Player
10	MF	SRB	Ersan Rovčanin (released)
5	DF	SRB	Vladimir Branković (to Radnički Sombor)

=== Voždovac ===
In: Note: Flags indicate national team as defined under FIFA eligibility rules; some limited exceptions apply. Players may hold more than one non-FIFA nationality.

No.	Pos.	Nation	Player
70	MF	SRB	Aleksa Janković (from Partizan)
21	MF	SRB	Edin Ajdinović (was on loan, now signed from Voždovac)
8	MF	SRB	Ivan Milosavljević (on loan from Partizan)
7	DF	SRB	Nemanja Vučić (from Vojvodina)
20	FW	SRB	Filip Stuparević (on loan from (England) Watford)
12	GK	SRB	Despot Mihailović (from Zvezdara)
33	DF	SRB	Nemanja Pejčinović (free, last with (China) Changchun Yatai)

Out: Note: Flags indicate national team as defined under FIFA eligibility rules; some limited exceptions apply. Players may hold more than one non-FIFA nationality.

No.	Pos.	Nation	Player
3	DF	SRB	Nemanja Lakić-Pešić (to Napredak Kruševac)
18	FW	UKR	Marko Dević (to (Azerbaijan) Sabah)
21	DF	SRB	Miloš Mihajlov (to Inđija)
20	FW	SRB	Aleksandar Jevtić (retired)
7	FW	SRB	Alen Mašović (to (Japan) Machida Zelvia)
30	FW	SRB	Ognjen Krasić (to Inđija)
17	FW	SRB	Aleksandar Stanisavljević (to (Kazakhstan) Caspiy)
15	DF	SRB	Damjan Daničić (to (Croatia) Dinamo Zagreb II)
24	MF	SRB	Stefan Purtić (on loan to Inđija)
6	DF	SRB	Strahinja Bošnjak (on loan to Kolubara)
8	MF	SRB	Strahinja Karišić (to Sinđelić Beograd)

=== Radnički Niš ===
In: Note: Flags indicate national team as defined under FIFA eligibility rules; some limited exceptions apply. Players may hold more than one non-FIFA nationality.

No.	Pos.	Nation	Player
20	MF	SRB	Nikola Čumić (on loan from, previously sold to (Greece) Olympiacos)
51	DF	SRB	Mario Maslać (from (North Macedonia) Akademija Pandev)
11	MF	SRB	Nemanja Subotić (from (Kazakhstan) Taraz)
15	MF	SRB	Aleksandar Pejović (from (Belarus) Dinamo Minsk)
36	FW	SRB	Nemanja Kojić (from Napredak Kruševac)
6	MF	SRB	Ognjen Bjeličić (from Inđija)
77	MF	SRB	Stefan Milosavljević (from Mačva Šabac)
21	DF	BIH	Bojan Letić (from (Bosnia and Herzegovina) Sarajevo)
17	GK	SRB	Borivoje Ristić (from (Greece) AEL)
70	MF	SRB	Milosav Sićović (from Sinđelić Beograd)
27	DF	SRB	Petar Ćirković (loan return from Radnički Pirot)
22	DF	CHN	Runze Hao (from (Spain) Recreativo Granada)

Out: Note: Flags indicate national team as defined under FIFA eligibility rules; some limited exceptions apply. Players may hold more than one non-FIFA nationality.

No.	Pos.	Nation	Player
25	DF	IRQ	Rebin Sulaka (released)
17	FW	BIH	Nermin Haskić (to (Japan) Omiya Ardija)
33	MF	SVK	Erik Jirka (loan return to Red Star Belgrade)
89	GK	SRB	Marko Knežević (to Inđija)
6	DF	SRB	Ivan Ostojić (to (Finland) HJK Helsinki)
14	DF	UKR	Taras Bondarenko (to (Kazakhstan) Caspiy)
21	MF	SRB	Aleksa Jovanović (to Inđija)
3	DF	SRB	Stefan Đorđević (to Vojvodina)
—	DF	SRB	Filip Stanković (to Car Konstantin)
32	GK	SRB	Milorad Kojić (on loan to Radnički Pirot)
28	MF	JPN	Ryota Noma (released)
2	DF	BIH	Nemanja Nikolić (loan return to (Greece) Olympiacos)
99	FW	SWE	Marko Mitrović (to (Portugal) Beira-Mar)
70	MF	MNE	Veljko Batrović (to (Bulgaria) Septemvri Sofia)

=== Spartak Subotica ===
In: Note: Flags indicate national team as defined under FIFA eligibility rules; some limited exceptions apply. Players may hold more than one non-FIFA nationality.

No.	Pos.	Nation	Player
3	MF	JPN	Noboru Shimura (loan return from (Japan) Machida Zelvia)
11	MF	MNE	Nikša Vujanović (from Partizan)
15	MF	SRB	Milan Milanović (from Novi Pazar)
90	MF	SRB	Strahinja Jovanović (from Partizan)
99	MF	BIH	Filip Dujmović (on loan from (Bosnia and Herzegovina) Mladost Doboj Kakanj)
22	FW	SRB	Nemanja Nikolić (on from Partizan)
77	FW	SRB	Luka Bijelović (loan return from Bačka 1901)
91	FW	SRB	Andrija Milić (loan return from Bačka 1901)

Out: Note: Flags indicate national team as defined under FIFA eligibility rules; some limited exceptions apply. Players may hold more than one non-FIFA nationality.

No.	Pos.	Nation	Player
23	FW	SRB	Nemanja Obradović (to (Hungary) Kisvárda)
33	MF	SRB	Nemanja Mladenović (to Javor Ivanjica)
22	DF	SRB	Luka Cucin (loan return to Partizan)
40	FW	JPN	Sho Yamamoto (on loan to (Montenegro) Iskra Danilovgrad)
2	DF	SRB	Filip Jović (on loan to Smederevo 1924)
27	DF	SRB	Slađan Rakić (loan extension to Smederevo 1924)
15	DF	SRB	Filip Damjanović (released)
12	GK	SRB	Miloš Ostojić (on loan to Kolubara)
24	FW	SRB	Nikola Tripković (on loan to Smederevo 1924)

=== Mladost Lučani ===
In: Note: Flags indicate national team as defined under FIFA eligibility rules; some limited exceptions apply. Players may hold more than one non-FIFA nationality.

No.	Pos.	Nation	Player
55	DF	BIH	Petar Jovanović (from Zlatibor Čajetina)
42	MF	SRB	Aleksandar Ješić (from Metalac GM)
29	MF	SRB	Veljko Kijevčanin (loan return from Borac Čačak)
45	FW	SRB	Stefan Tešić (loan return from Borac Čačak)
8	MF	BIH	Damjan Krajišnik (free, last with (Denmark) Næstved BK)
13	DF	SRB	Nikola Tričković (from Rad)

Out: Note: Flags indicate national team as defined under FIFA eligibility rules; some limited exceptions apply. Players may hold more than one non-FIFA nationality.

No.	Pos.	Nation	Player
35	FW	SRB	Nikola Leković (to (Bosnia and Herzegovina) Tuzla City)
8	MF	SRB	Ivan Obrovac (to Mačva Šabac)
1	GK	SRB	Mladen Živković (to Mačva Šabac)
28	DF	SRB	Nikola Andrić (to Vojvodina)
55	MF	SRB	Miloš Ristić (released)
9	FW	GHA	Zakaria Suraka (to (Bosnia and Herzegovina) Mladost Doboj Kakanj)
20	MF	SRB	Danilo Sekulić (to (Indonesia) Barito Putera)

=== Napredak Kruševac ===
In: Note: Flags indicate national team as defined under FIFA eligibility rules; some limited exceptions apply. Players may hold more than one non-FIFA nationality.

No.	Pos.	Nation	Player
11	MF	MNE	Milan Vušurović (from (Bulgaria) Botev Vratsa)
20	MF	SRB	Miloš Mijić (from (Montenegro) Budućnost Podgorica)
25	DF	SRB	Dušan Stević (from Rad)
98	GK	SRB	Aleksandar Stanković (on loan from Red Star Belgrade)
14	FW	SRB	Dejan Vidić (on loan from Red Star Belgrade)
52	GK	MNE	Marko Kordić (from (Montenegro) Bokelj)
8	MF	SRB	Marko Mrkić (free, last with Radnički Niš)
10	FW	CMR	Aboubakar Oumarou (free, last with (Saudi Arabia) Al-Qadsiah)
4	DF	SRB	Nemanja Lakić-Pešić (from Voždovac)
21	FW	SRB	Kosta Aleksić (on loan from Čukarički)

Out: Note: Flags indicate national team as defined under FIFA eligibility rules; some limited exceptions apply. Players may hold more than one non-FIFA nationality.

No.	Pos.	Nation	Player
20	FW	SRB	Đuro Zec (to TSC)
10	FW	SRB	Igor Ivanović (to (Belarus) Shakhtyor Soligorsk)
17	MF	SRB	Miljan Vukadinović (to Vojvodina)
22	DF	SRB	Dušan Veškovac (retired)
36	FW	SRB	Nemanja Kojić (to Radnički Niš)
49	MF	SRB	Aleksandar Mesarović (to Kabel)
20	FW	SRB	Miloš Zukanović (to Mačva Šabac)
34	GK	SRB	Marko Milošević (to (Kazakhstan) Caspiy)
—	FW	SRB	Slobodan Babić (on loan to Smederevo 1924, previously bought from Sloga Kraljevo)

=== Proleter Novi Sad ===
In: Note: Flags indicate national team as defined under FIFA eligibility rules; some limited exceptions apply. Players may hold more than one non-FIFA nationality.

No.	Pos.	Nation	Player
77	DF	SRB	Goran Smiljanić (from Rad)
7	MF	SRB	Petar Karaklajić (from Brodarac)
1	GK	SRB	Nikola Perić (free, last with Dinamo Vranje)
15	DF	SRB	Dušan Joković (from (Croatia) Lokomotiva)
—	FW	SRB	Jovan Ilić (from Brodarac)
—	MF	SRB	Danilo Bacanović (from Brodarac)
75	MF	SRB	Uroš Vesić (from Zlatibor Čajetina)

Out: Note: Flags indicate national team as defined under FIFA eligibility rules; some limited exceptions apply. Players may hold more than one non-FIFA nationality.

No.	Pos.	Nation	Player
21	MF	SRB	Marko Pantić (to OFK Bačka)
20	MF	SRB	Branislav Jovanović (released)
55	DF	SRB	Miljan Jablan (to Kabel)
11	FW	SRB	Stefan Čolović (to (Republic of Ireland) Dundalk)
1	GK	SRB	Vladan Elesin (to Trayal)
13	DF	SRB	Stefan Jovanović (to OFK Bačka)
44	DF	SRB	Bojan Kovačević (on loan to (Kazakhstan) Caspiy)

=== Javor Ivanjica ===
In: Note: Flags indicate national team as defined under FIFA eligibility rules; some limited exceptions apply. Players may hold more than one non-FIFA nationality.

No.	Pos.	Nation	Player
19	MF	SRB	Ivan Rogač (from Inđija)
14	MF	SRB	Luka Radivojević (from Jedinstvo Ub)
22	DF	SRB	Ivan Vasiljević (from (Slovenia) Rudar Velenje)
33	MF	SRB	Nemanja Mladenović (from Spartak Subotica)
9	FW	SRB	Saša Varga (from (Slovenia) Radomlje)
16	MF	SRB	Luka Luković (from Čukarički)
1	GK	SRB	Rastko Šuljagić (from Radnički Pirot)
3	DF	SRB	Andrej Jakovljević (from Vojvodina)
5	MF	SRB	Zoran Švonja (from (Bulgaria) Lokomotiv Sofia)

Out: Note: Flags indicate national team as defined under FIFA eligibility rules; some limited exceptions apply. Players may hold more than one non-FIFA nationality.

No.	Pos.	Nation	Player
2	DF	SRB	Veljko Filipović (on loan to Sinđelić Beograd)
31	MF	SRB	Vladimir Jovanović (on loan to Sinđelić Beograd)
5	MF	SRB	Nikola Kuveljić (to (Poland) Wisła Kraków)
22	FW	BIH	Momčilo Mrkaić (to Vojvodina)
14	DF	SRB	Marko Kolaković (to (Uzbekistan) Soʻgʻdiyona PFK)
24	DF	MKD	Aleksa Amanović (to (Kazakhstan) Tobol)
33	MF	SRB	Nikola Cuckić (to (Kazakhstan) Aktobe)

=== Radnik Surdulica ===
In: Note: Flags indicate national team as defined under FIFA eligibility rules; some limited exceptions apply. Players may hold more than one non-FIFA nationality.

No.	Pos.	Nation	Player
40	GK	SRB	Nikola Vasiljević (on loan from Red Star Belgrade)
25	MF	SRB	Filip Jović (from Novi Pazar)
8	MF	SRB	Viktor Lukić (from Čukarički)
88	MF	IDN	Witan Sulaeman (from (Indonesia) PSIM Yogyakarta)

Out: Note: Flags indicate national team as defined under FIFA eligibility rules; some limited exceptions apply. Players may hold more than one non-FIFA nationality.

No.	Pos.	Nation	Player
33	DF	SRB	Aleksandar Stanisavljević (to (Bulgaria) Botev Vratsa)
—	MF	MKD	Nikola Bogdanovski (to Novi Pazar, was on loan at Žarkovo)
8	MF	SRB	Uroš Damnjanović (from Rad)
1	GK	SRB	Nikola Vujanac (to (Bosnia and Herzegovina) Zvijezda 09)
14	MF	SRB	Risto Ristović (to Kolubara)

=== Inđija ===
In: Note: Flags indicate national team as defined under FIFA eligibility rules; some limited exceptions apply. Players may hold more than one non-FIFA nationality.

No.	Pos.	Nation	Player
4	DF	SRB	Miloš Mihajlov (from Voždovac)
23	MF	MNE	Vojin Pavlović (from (Montenegro) OFK Titograd)
2	DF	SRB	Luka Cucin (on loan from Partizan)
7	FW	SRB	Ognjen Krasić (from Voždovac)
20	MF	SRB	Aleksa Jovanović (from Radnički Niš)
29	GK	SRB	Marko Knežević (from Radnički Niš)
9	FW	SRB	Miroslav Marković (from (Morocco) Hassania Agadir)
24	MF	SRB	Stefan Purtić (on loan from Voždovac)
5	DF	SRB	Mihailo Jovanović (from (Kazakhstan) Taraz)
37	DF	CHN	Li Siqi (from Smederevo 1924)

Out: Note: Flags indicate national team as defined under FIFA eligibility rules; some limited exceptions apply. Players may hold more than one non-FIFA nationality.

No.	Pos.	Nation	Player
23	MF	SRB	Ivan Rogač (to Javor Ivanjica)
6	MF	SRB	Ognjen Bjeličić (to Radnički Niš)
33	DF	SRB	Ivan Josović (to (Uzbekistan) Kokand 1912)
20	DF	SRB	Nikola Janković (to (Bosnia and Herzegovina) Zvijezda 09)
7	MF	SRB	Saša Jovanović (to Rad)
4	DF	ESP	Diego Bardanca (to (Slovenia) ND Gorica)
—	MF	SRB	Boško Vraštanovć (to Sinđelić Beograd)

=== Rad ===
In: Note: Flags indicate national team as defined under FIFA eligibility rules; some limited exceptions apply. Players may hold more than one non-FIFA nationality.

No.	Pos.	Nation	Player
99	FW	SRB	Andrija Kaluđerović (from (Croatia) Inter Zaprešić)
25	DF	SRB	Milan Lazarević (from Vojvodina)
10	MF	SRB	Saša Jovanović (from Inđija)
19	DF	SRB	Strahinja Tanasijević (on loan from (Italy) Chievo)
74	FW	SRB	Marko Dedijer (from Red Star Belgrade)
8	MF	SRB	Uroš Damnjanović (from Radnik Surdulica)
77	DF	SRB	Dejan Parađina (loan return from Kolubara)
6	DF	SRB	Uroš Sekulić (from (Slovenia) Triglav Kranj)

Out: Note: Flags indicate national team as defined under FIFA eligibility rules; some limited exceptions apply. Players may hold more than one non-FIFA nationality.

No.	Pos.	Nation	Player
25	DF	SRB	Dušan Stević (to Napredak Kruševac)
30	FW	SRB	Darko Bjedov (to (Iran) Zob Ahan)
—	DF	SRB	Goran Smiljanić (to Proleter Novi Sad)
11	MF	UKR	Yevhen Kovalenko (to (Montenegro) Grbalj)
13	DF	SRB	Nikola Tričković (to Mladost Lučani)
23	MF	SRB	Miloš Šaka (to (Slovenia) Aluminij)
6	MF	SRB	Veljko Roganović (to Kolubara)

=== Mačva Šabac ===
In: Note: Flags indicate national team as defined under FIFA eligibility rules; some limited exceptions apply. Players may hold more than one non-FIFA nationality.

No.	Pos.	Nation	Player
—	MF	SRB	Đorđe Belić (loan return from Loznica)
9	FW	SRB	Petar Gigić (on loan from Partizan)
8	MF	SRB	Ivan Obrovac (from Mladost Lučani)
1	GK	SRB	Mladen Živković (from Mladost Lučani)
51	GK	SRB	Miloš Gordić (on loan from Red Star Belgrade)
18	FW	SRB	Miloš Zukanović (from Napredak Kruševac)
12	FW	SRB	Branko Mihajlović (from (Hungary) Diósgyőri VTK)
22	MF	SRB	Igor Stanojević (from (Armenia) Urartu)
10	MF	SRB	Nikola Milinković (from (Uzbekistan) Soʻgʻdiyona PFK)

Out: Note: Flags indicate national team as defined under FIFA eligibility rules; some limited exceptions apply. Players may hold more than one non-FIFA nationality.

No.	Pos.	Nation	Player
55	GK	SRB	Dušan Puletić (to Metalac GM)
78	MF	SRB	Filip Čermelj (released)
10	MF	SRB	Mile Vujasin (to Kolubara)
9	FW	SRB	Nikola Ašćerić (to (Indonesia) Persik Kediri)
77	MF	SRB	Stefan Milosavljević (to Radnički Niš)
50	MF	SRB	Nenad Marinković (to (North Macedonia) Sileks)
8	DF	AUS	Andrew Marveggio (to (Montenegro) Bokelj)
23	FW	SRB	Marko Jeremić (to Žarkovo)

== Serbian First League ==
=== Grafičar ===
In: Note: Flags indicate national team as defined under FIFA eligibility rules; some limited exceptions apply. Players may hold more than one non-FIFA nationality.

No.	Pos.	Nation	Player
1	GK	SRB	Miloš Čupić (on loan from Red Star Belgrade)
17	MF	SRB	Miloš Pantović (on loan from Red Star Belgrade)
18	MF	SRB	Stefan Cvetković (on loan from Red Star Belgrade)
16	MF	KEN	Richard Odada (on loan from Red Star Belgrade)
19	FW	SRB	Uroš Milovanović (on loan from Red Star Belgrade)
25	DF	SRB	Matija Gočobija (from Brodarac)
33	MF	SRB	Dimitrije Pobulić (from Radnički Pirot)
9	FW	MNE	Nikola Krstović (on loan from Red Star Belgrade)

Out: Note: Flags indicate national team as defined under FIFA eligibility rules; some limited exceptions apply. Players may hold more than one non-FIFA nationality.

No.	Pos.	Nation	Player
3	DF	SRB	Marko Konatar (loan return to Red Star Belgrade)
9	FW	SRB	Dejan Vidić (loan return to Red Star Belgrade)
10	MF	SRB	Željko Gavrić (loan return to Red Star Belgrade)
18	FW	SRB	Milan Panović (released)
25	FW	SRB	Aleksandar Stojković (released)
—	GK	SRB	Miloš Gordić (loan return to Red Star Belgrade)
5	DF	SRB	Stefan Marjanović (to (Montenegro) Podgorica)
16	MF	SRB	Miloš Nikolić (loan return to Red Star Belgrade)

=== Metalac GM ===
In: Note: Flags indicate national team as defined under FIFA eligibility rules; some limited exceptions apply. Players may hold more than one non-FIFA nationality.

No.	Pos.	Nation	Player
55	GK	SRB	Dušan Puletić (from Mačva Šabac)
9	FW	SRB	Nikola Popović (from Dinamo Vranje)
88	FW	CGO	Prestige Mboungou (from (Czech Republic) MFK Vyškov)
14	DF	SRB	Marko Vančagović (from BSK Borča)
20	DF	SRB	Igor Vićentijević (from Budućnost Krušik 2014)
25	FW	SRB	Damir Anđelović (from Takovo)
33	MF	SRB	David Spasojević (from (Austria) SV Ried U19)

Out: Note: Flags indicate national team as defined under FIFA eligibility rules; some limited exceptions apply. Players may hold more than one non-FIFA nationality.

No.	Pos.	Nation	Player
10	MF	SRB	Aleksandar Ješić (to Mladost Lučani)
2	DF	SRB	Dejan Koraksić (to Novi Pazar)
1	GK	MNE	Milan Jelovac (to (Montenegro) Grbalj)
14	FW	SRB	Predrag Radić (to Žarkovo)
9	FW	SRB	Nikola Nović (to Sinđelić Beograd)
24	MF	SRB	Nemanja Vukmanović (to Sinđelić Beograd)

=== Zlatibor Čajetina ===
In: Note: Flags indicate national team as defined under FIFA eligibility rules; some limited exceptions apply. Players may hold more than one non-FIFA nationality.

No.	Pos.	Nation	Player
1	GK	SRB	Miloš Rnić (from Kolubara)
7	MF	SRB	Miloš Stanković (from Vlasina)
8	MF	SRB	Ifet Đakovac (from Tutin)
19	FW	SRB	Stefan Vukić (from Budućnost Dobanovci)
20	DF	SRB	Sreten Atanasković (from Smederevo 1924)
30	DF	MNE	Danilo Bracanović (from (Montenegro) Lovćen)
17	MF	MNE	Božidar Bujiša (from (Montenegro) Lovćen)

Out: Note: Flags indicate national team as defined under FIFA eligibility rules; some limited exceptions apply. Players may hold more than one non-FIFA nationality.

No.	Pos.	Nation	Player
7	DF	BIH	Petar Jovanović (to Mladost Lučani)
1	GK	SRB	Miloš Čupić (loan return to Red Star Belgrade)
25	MF	SRB	Uroš Vesić (to Proleter Novi Sad)
70	DF	KOR	Lee Gee-hyeon (to Trayal)
17	MF	SRB	Uroš Vukićević (to Sinđelić Beograd)
8	MF	SRB	Marko Stojanović (to Smederevo 1924)
18	MF	JPN	Hiroya Kiyomoto (to (Montenegro) Arsenal Tivat)
19	MF	JPN	Ryo Tachibana (to (Montenegro) Arsenal Tivat)

=== OFK Bačka ===
In: Note: Flags indicate national team as defined under FIFA eligibility rules; some limited exceptions apply. Players may hold more than one non-FIFA nationality.

No.	Pos.	Nation	Player
8	MF	SRB	Marko Pantić (from Proleter Novi Sad)
14	DF	SRB	Sava Radić (from Trayal)
13	MF	SRB	Milenko Škorić (from Žarkovo)
21	DF	SRB	Stefan Jovanović (from Proleter Novi Sad)
99	GK	SRB	Nenad Mitrović (from (Slovakia) MŠK Fomat Martin)
6	DF	SRB	Dragan Žarković (free, last with same team)
7	MF	SRB	Mladen Lukić (from Žarkovo)
17	MF	RUS	Shabat Logua (from (Russia) Tyumen)
20	FW	SRB	Miloš Zličić (from Bečej 1918)
22	FW	SRB	Danilo Aleksić (from Brodarac)

Out: Note: Flags indicate national team as defined under FIFA eligibility rules; some limited exceptions apply. Players may hold more than one non-FIFA nationality.

No.	Pos.	Nation	Player
21	MF	SRB	Nikola Stojanović (to (Montenegro) Dečić)
30	FW	SRB	Nikola Gajić (to Kabel)
8	FW	SRB	Marko Simić (to Kolubara)
22	MF	SRB	Nemanja Milovanović (to Kolubara)

=== Kabel ===
In: Note: Flags indicate national team as defined under FIFA eligibility rules; some limited exceptions apply. Players may hold more than one non-FIFA nationality.

No.	Pos.	Nation	Player
17	MF	SRB	Aleksandar Mesarović (from Napredak Kruševac)
24	MF	MNE	Petar Pavlićević (on loan from Vojvodina)
12	GK	SRB	Bojan Brač (from Hajduk Kula)
9	FW	SRB	Milan Vidakov (on loan from Vojvodina)
18	FW	SRB	Nikola Gajić (from OFK Bačka)
20	DF	SRB	Miljan Jablan (from Proleter Novi Sad)

Out: Note: Flags indicate national team as defined under FIFA eligibility rules; some limited exceptions apply. Players may hold more than one non-FIFA nationality.

No.	Pos.	Nation	Player
18	MF	SRB	Aleksa Vujić (released)
20	DF	SRB	Faruk Bihorac (to (Bosnia and Herzegovina) Velež Mostar)
5	DF	SRB	Marko Bjeković (loan return to Vojvodina)

=== Kolubara ===
In: Note: Flags indicate national team as defined under FIFA eligibility rules; some limited exceptions apply. Players may hold more than one non-FIFA nationality.

No.	Pos.	Nation	Player
1	GK	SRB	Miloš Ostojić (on loan from Spartak Subotica)
3	DF	BIH	Ljubiša Pecelj (from (Bosnia and Herzegovina) Čelik Zenica)
4	DF	SRB	Filip Antonijević (from Teleoptik)
5	DF	SRB	Nikola Vasiljević (from Vojvodina)
6	MF	SRB	Veljko Roganović (from Rad)
8	MF	SRB	Risto Ristović (from Radnik Surdulica)
11	FW	SRB	Marko Simić (from OFK Bačka)
16	MF	SRB	Petar Bojović (from (Switzerland) Srbija Zürich)
18	MF	SRB	Mile Vujasin (from Mačva Šabac)
19	MF	SRB	Nemanja Milovanović (from OFK Bačka)
24	DF	SRB	Strahinja Bošnjak (on loan from Voždovac)
25	FW	SRB	Luka Jovanić (from Kabel)
27	MF	SRB	Andreja Stojanović (from Zemun)

Out: Note: Flags indicate national team as defined under FIFA eligibility rules; some limited exceptions apply. Players may hold more than one non-FIFA nationality.

No.	Pos.	Nation	Player
25	DF	SRB	Dejan Parađina (loan return to Rad)
5	DF	SRB	Luka Jeličić (to Budućnost Dobanovci)
—	FW	SRB	Nenad Radonjić (to Radnički 1923)
1	GK	SRB	Miloš Rnić (to Zlatibor Čajetina)

=== Radnički Pirot ===
In: Note: Flags indicate national team as defined under FIFA eligibility rules; some limited exceptions apply. Players may hold more than one non-FIFA nationality.

No.	Pos.	Nation	Player
20	FW	SRB	Marko Šarić (on loan from Čukarički)
33	MF	MNE	Bojica Nikčević (on loan from Čukarički)
37	GK	SRB	Milorad Kojić (on loan from Radnički Niš)
1	GK	SRB	Stefan Stojanović (from Trayal)
5	DF	SRB	Dimitrije Mijalković (from Zvezdara)
7	MF	SRB	Irfan Vusljanin (from Novi Pazar)
18	DF	SRB	Dušan Savićević (from BSK Borča)

Out: Note: Flags indicate national team as defined under FIFA eligibility rules; some limited exceptions apply. Players may hold more than one non-FIFA nationality.

No.	Pos.	Nation	Player
37	GK	SRB	Rastko Šuljagić (to Javor Ivanjica)
33	MF	SRB	Dimitrije Pobulić (to Grafičar Beograd)
27	DF	SRB	Petar Ćirković (loan return to Radnički Niš)
1	GK	SRB	Zvezdan Cvetanović (to Dinamo Vranje)

=== Novi Pazar ===
In: Note: Flags indicate national team as defined under FIFA eligibility rules; some limited exceptions apply. Players may hold more than one non-FIFA nationality.

No.	Pos.	Nation	Player
11	MF	SRB	Semir Hadžibulić (from (Faroe Islands) KÍ Klaksvík)
3	DF	SRB	Dejan Koraksić (from Metalac GM)
4	DF	SRB	Nemanja Trajković (from Trayal)
7	MF	MKD	Nikola Bogdanovski (from Radnik Surdulica)
19	MF	SRB	Admir Kecap (from Trayal Kruševac)
1	GK	SRB	Marko Drobnjak (from Jošanica)
15	DF	SRB	Vahid Zimonjić (from Jošanica)
20	MF	SRB	Goran Lončar (from Brodarac)
77	FW	SRB	Miloš Gordić (from Smederevo 1924)

Out: Note: Flags indicate national team as defined under FIFA eligibility rules; some limited exceptions apply. Players may hold more than one non-FIFA nationality.

No.	Pos.	Nation	Player
15	MF	SRB	Milan Milanović (to Spartak Subotica)
9	FW	SRB	Dženan Plojović (to Dinamo Vranje)
35	MF	SRB	Filip Jović (to Radnik Surdulica)
4	DF	MNE	Filip Mitrović (to (Montenegro) Kom)
29	FW	SRB	Milan Bubalo (to Budućnost Dobanovci)
7	MF	SRB	Irfan Vusljanin (to Radnički Pirot)

=== Dinamo Vranje ===
In: Note: Flags indicate national team as defined under FIFA eligibility rules; some limited exceptions apply. Players may hold more than one non-FIFA nationality.

No.	Pos.	Nation	Player
2	DF	SRB	Milan Lalić (from Budućnost Dobanovci)
30	MF	SRB	Tigran Goranović (from Sinđelić Beograd)
9	FW	SRB	Dženan Plojović (from Novi Pazar)
21	GK	SRB	Zvezdan Cvetanović (from Radnički Pirot)
21	GK	BIH	Benjamin Čalaković (on loan from (Bosnia and Herzegovina) Tuzla City)
5	DF	SRB	Vukašin Jelić (from (Croatia) BSK Bijelo Brdo)
20	DF	SRB	Filip Radović (from Radnički Beograd)
8	DF	SRB	Nikola Jakovljević (from (Germany) SV Rülzheim)
25	FW	SRB	Danilo Kovačević (from Jedinstvo Surčin)
33	DF	SRB	Miljan Kovačević (from Jedinstvo Surčin)
45	DF	BIH	Dejan Popović (from (Bosnia and Herzegovina) Leotar)
92	MF	SRB	Marko Keča (from Radnički Beograd)
99	FW	SRB	Željko Dimitrov (free, last with same club)

Out: Note: Flags indicate national team as defined under FIFA eligibility rules; some limited exceptions apply. Players may hold more than one non-FIFA nationality.

No.	Pos.	Nation	Player
33	DF	SRB	Miloš Marković (released)
22	FW	SRB	Nikola Popović (to Metalac G.M.)
10	FW	SRB	Mladen Popović (released)
7	FW	SRB	Filip Bajić (released)
25	DF	MNE	Janko Simović (to (Montenegro) Grbalj)

=== Žarkovo ===
In: Note: Flags indicate national team as defined under FIFA eligibility rules; some limited exceptions apply. Players may hold more than one non-FIFA nationality.

No.	Pos.	Nation	Player
71	GK	SRB	Nemanja Jevrić (free, last with Javor Ivanjica)
3	FW	SRB	Luka Lemić (free, last with Budućnost Dobanovci)
4	DF	SRB	Aleksandar Tasić (from (Sweden) Vasalunds IF)
7	FW	SRB	Nikola Nešović (from Zemun)
23	FW	SRB	Marko Jeremić (from Mačva Šabac)
77	FW	SRB	Predrag Radić (from Metalac GM)
9	MF	TAN	Nassor Saadun Hamoud (free)

Out: Note: Flags indicate national team as defined under FIFA eligibility rules; some limited exceptions apply. Players may hold more than one non-FIFA nationality.

No.	Pos.	Nation	Player
7	MF	MKD	Nikola Bogdanovski (loan return to Radnik Surdulica)
13	MF	SRB	Milenko Škorić (to OFK Bačka)
4	DF	SRB	Nemanja Marković (to (Montenegro) Rudar Pljevlja)
12	GK	SRB	Aleksandar Kirovski (to Budućnost Dobanovci)
77	FW	SRB	Igor Aničić (to Budućnost Dobanovci)
3	DF	BIH	Marko Čubrilo (to Budućnost Dobanovci)
7	MF	SRB	Mladen Lukić (to OFK Bačka)

=== Radnički 1923 ===
In: Note: Flags indicate national team as defined under FIFA eligibility rules; some limited exceptions apply. Players may hold more than one non-FIFA nationality.

No.	Pos.	Nation	Player
45	FW	SRB	Nenad Radonjić (from Kolubara)

Out: Note: Flags indicate national team as defined under FIFA eligibility rules; some limited exceptions apply. Players may hold more than one non-FIFA nationality.

No.	Pos.	Nation	Player
—	FW	SRB	Željko Žerađanin (to Smederevo 1924)

=== Trayal ===
In: Note: Flags indicate national team as defined under FIFA eligibility rules; some limited exceptions apply. Players may hold more than one non-FIFA nationality.

No.	Pos.	Nation	Player
1	GK	SRB	Vladan Elesin (from Proleter Novi Sad)
2	DF	SRB	Nemanja Milosavljević (free, last with same club)
3	DF	SRB	Dušan Mijić (from Hajduk Kula)
6	MF	SRB	Luka Marković (from Trstenik)
10	MF	SRB	Veljko Jovković (from Smederevo 1924)
14	MF	SRB	Marko Kilibarda (from Sloga Požega)
26	DF	SRB	Radosav Aleksić (from (Uzbekistan) Andijon)
70	DF	KOR	Lee Gee-hyeon (from Zlatibor Čajetina)

Out: Note: Flags indicate national team as defined under FIFA eligibility rules; some limited exceptions apply. Players may hold more than one non-FIFA nationality.

No.	Pos.	Nation	Player
6	DF	SRB	Nemanja Trajković (to Novi Pazar)
14	MF	SRB	Admir Kecap (to Novi Pazar)
2	DF	SRB	Sava Radić (to OFK Bačka)
10	MF	SRB	Đorđe Radovanović (to Budućnost Dobanovci)
1	GK	SRB	Stefan Stojanović (to Radnički Pirot)

=== Zemun ===
In: Note: Flags indicate national team as defined under FIFA eligibility rules; some limited exceptions apply. Players may hold more than one non-FIFA nationality.

No.	Pos.	Nation	Player
14	DF	SRB	Nemanja Stevanović (from GSP Polet Dorćol)

Out: Note: Flags indicate national team as defined under FIFA eligibility rules; some limited exceptions apply. Players may hold more than one non-FIFA nationality.

No.	Pos.	Nation	Player
13	MF	SRB	Saša Filipović (to Sloboda Užice)
21	FW	SRB	Nikola Nešović (to Žarkovo)
7	DF	SRB	Nikola Vukajlović (to (Montenegro) Budućnost Podgorica)
31	DF	SRB	Igor Krmar (released)
6	MF	MKD	Milosh Tosheski (to (North Macedonia) Rabotnichki)
—	MF	SRB	Andreja Stojanović (to Kolubara)

=== Sinđelić Beograd ===
In: Note: Flags indicate national team as defined under FIFA eligibility rules; some limited exceptions apply. Players may hold more than one non-FIFA nationality.

No.	Pos.	Nation	Player
6	DF	SRB	Veljko Filipović (on loan from Javor Ivanjica)
30	MF	SRB	Vladimir Jovanović (on loan from Javor Ivanjica)
27	GK	SRB	Milovan Lekić (from Mačva Šabac)
3	DF	SRB	Nikola Žerjal (from Zvezdara)
8	MF	SRB	Strahinja Karišić (from Voždovac)
9	FW	SRB	Nikola Nović (from Metalac G.M.)
10	MF	SRB	Boško Vraštanovć (from Inđija)
20	DF	GRE	Dimitrios Tzinovits (from IMT)
21	MF	SRB	Uroš Vukićević (from Zlatibor Čajetina)
22	FW	SRB	Nikola Ilkić (free, last with (Slovakia) MŠK Novohrad Lučenec)
23	FW	SRB	Đorđe Šošević (from Čukarički)
25	MF	SRB	Miloš Nikolić (on loan from Red Star Belgrade)
26	MF	SRB	Nemanja Vukmanović (from Metalac G.M.)

Out: Note: Flags indicate national team as defined under FIFA eligibility rules; some limited exceptions apply. Players may hold more than one non-FIFA nationality.

No.	Pos.	Nation	Player
10	MF	SRB	Vasilije Đurić (to TSC)
15	MF	SRB	Milosav Sićović (to Radnički Niš)
30	MF	SRB	Tigran Goranović (to Dinamo Vranje)
20	MF	SRB	Pavle Radunović (to (Montenegro) Petrovac)

=== Smederevo 1924 ===
In: Note: Flags indicate national team as defined under FIFA eligibility rules; some limited exceptions apply. Players may hold more than one non-FIFA nationality.

No.	Pos.	Nation	Player
19	DF	SRB	Filip Jović (on loan from Spartak Subotica)
69	DF	SRB	Slađan Rakić (loan extension from Spartak Subotica)
12	GK	SRB	Ivan Lučić (from RSK Rabrovo)
5	MF	SRB	Strahinja Urošević (from Sloga Petrovac na Mlavi)
7	FW	SRB	Željko Žerađanin (from Radnički 1923)
9	FW	SRB	Nikola Tripković (on loan from Spartak Subotica)
14	MF	SRB	Stefan Nedović (from Sušica Kragujevac)
16	MF	BIH	Marko Simović (from (Bosnia and Herzegovina) Leotar)
17	MF	SRB	Nemanja Tomasević (from (Slovenia) Rudar Velenje)
22	MF	SRB	Marko Džodan (free, last with Rad)
30	MF	SRB	Nikola Đuričić (from Radnički Beograd)
33	FW	SRB	Slobodan Babić (on loan from Napredak Kruševac)
44	MF	SRB	Marko Stojanović (from Zlatibor Čajetina)

Out: Note: Flags indicate national team as defined under FIFA eligibility rules; some limited exceptions apply. Players may hold more than one non-FIFA nationality.

No.	Pos.	Nation	Player
14	MF	SRB	Aleksandar Mirkov (to (Bosnia and Herzegovina) Mladost Doboj Kakanj)
94	FW	SUI	Milan Basrak (to (North Macedonia) Akademija Pandev)
30	DF	CHN	Li Siqi (to Inđija)
19	DF	AUT	Tode Đaković (to (Armenia) Lori)
23	FW	SRB	Stefan Matijević (released)
45	MF	SRB	Veljko Jovković (to Trayal Kruševac)
33	DF	SRB	Sreten Atanasković (to Zlatibor Čajetina)
77	FW	SRB	Miloš Gordić (to Novi Pazar)

=== Budućnost Dobanovci ===
In: Note: Flags indicate national team as defined under FIFA eligibility rules; some limited exceptions apply. Players may hold more than one non-FIFA nationality.

No.	Pos.	Nation	Player
1	GK	SRB	Aleksandar Kirovski (from Žarkovo)
5	DF	SRB	Luka Jeličić (from Kolubara)
6	FW	SRB	Miloš Kukolj (free, last with Partizan)
10	FW	SRB	Igor Aničić (from Žarkovo)
11	MF	SRB	Đorđe Radovanović (from Trayal)
15	DF	BIH	Marko Čubrilo (from Žarkovo)
22	FW	SRB	Milan Bubalo (from Novi Pazar)
24	DF	LBR	Omega Roberts (free, last with Novi Pazar)
2	DF	MNE	Boris Tatar (from (Montenegro) Titograd)

Out: Note: Flags indicate national team as defined under FIFA eligibility rules; some limited exceptions apply. Players may hold more than one non-FIFA nationality.

No.	Pos.	Nation	Player
2	DF	SRB	Milan Lalić (to Dinamo Vranje)
—	FW	SRB	Stefan Vukić (to Zlatibor Čajetina)

== See also ==
- Serbian SuperLiga
- Serbian First League
