= 2023–24 FK TSC season =

TSC
2023–24 season
- Manager: Žarko Lazetić
- Stadium: TSC Arena
- Serbian SuperLiga: 3rd
- Serbian Cup: Round of 32
- UEFA Champions League: Third qualifying round
- UEFA Europa League: Group stage
- Top goalscorer: League: Aleksandar Ćirković (16); All: Aleksandar Ćirković (17)
- Biggest win: 6–0 v Napredak Kruševac (Home, 23 May 2024, Serbian SuperLiga)
- Biggest defeat: 0–5 v SC Freiburg (Away, 9 November 2023, UEFA Europa League)
Home colours	Away colours	Third colours

The 2023–24 season was Fudbalski Klub TSC's 5th consecutive season in the Serbian SuperLiga. In addition to the domestic league, TSC participated in the Serbian Cup, the UEFA Champions League and the UEFA Europa League.

== Squad ==
As of 2 March 2024

Note: Flags indicate national team as defined under FIFA eligibility rules; some limited exceptions apply. Players may hold more than one non-FIFA nationality.

No.	Pos.	Nation	Player
1	GK	SRB	Nikola Simić
2	DF	SRB	Matija Popović
4	DF	CRO	Josip Ćalušić
6	DF	SRB	Aleksa Pejić
7	MF	SRB	Milan Radin
8	FW	SRB	Saša Jovanović
9	FW	SRB	Uroš Milovanović (on loan from Sporting Gijón)
10	FW	MKD	Martin Mirchevski
11	MF	SRB	Ivan Milosavljević
12	GK	SRB	Veljko Ilić
14	MF	SRB	Petar Stanić
18	DF	SRB	Nemanja Stojić
17	DF	SRB	Goran Antonić (Captain)
20	FW	SRB	Aleksa Preradov

No.	Pos.	Nation	Player
21	MF	SRB	Nikola Kuveljić
23	GK	SRB	Nemanja Jorgić
25	DF	SRB	Mateja Đorđević
27	MF	SRB	Miloš Pantović
29	DF	SRB	Miloš Cvetković
30	DF	SRB	Nemanja Petrović
32	FW	SRB	Aleksandar Ćirković (on loan from Krylia Sovetov Samara)
35	MF	SRB	Ifet Đakovac
37	MF	SRB	Miloš Vulić
44	DF	SRB	Vukašin Krstić
77	DF	SRB	Jovan Vlalukin
88	FW	HUN	Bence Sós
97	FW	MNE	Marko Rakonjac (on loan from Lokomotiv Moscow)
99	FW	SRB	Ognjen Teofilović

== Competitions ==
=== Overview ===
Competition	First match	Last match	Starting round	Final position	Record							
Competition	First match	Last match	Starting round	Final position	Pld	W	D	L	GF	GA	GD	Win %
Serbian SuperLiga	29 July 2023	23 May 2024	Matchday 1	3rd	37	22	9	6	75	39	+36	59.46
Serbian Cup	18 October 2023	18 October 2023	Round of 32	Round of 32	1	0	1	0	1	1	+0	0.00
UEFA Champions League	8 August 2023	15 August 2023	Third qualifying round	Third qualifying round	2	0	0	2	1	7	−6	0.00
UEFA Europa League	21 September 2023	14 December 2023	Group stage	Group stage	6	0	1	5	6	19	−13	0.00
Total					46	22	11	13	83	66	+17	47.83

Source: Competitions

=== Serbian SuperLiga ===
==== Regular season ====
===== League table =====
Pos	Team	Pld	W	D	L	GF	GA	GD	Pts	Qualification
1	Red Star Belgrade	30	25	2	3	77	22	+55	77	Qualification for the Championship round
2	Partizan	30	22	4	4	66	35	+31	70	Qualification for the Championship round
3	TSC	30	17	9	4	57	29	+28	60	Qualification for the Championship round
4	Vojvodina	30	14	8	8	49	42	+7	50	Qualification for the Championship round
5	Radnički 1923	30	16	2	12	46	46	0	50	Qualification for the Championship round

Source: SuperLiga (in Serbian)
Rules for classification: 1) Points; 2) Head-to-head points; 3) Head-to-head goal difference; 4) Head-to-head goals scored; 5) Head-to-head away goals scored (if two teams tied); 6) Goal difference; 7) Goals scored; 8) Fair play ranking; 9) Draw.

===== Results summary =====
Overall								Home						Away					
Pld	W	D	L	GF	GA	GD	Pts	W	D	L	GF	GA	GD	W	D	L	GF	GA	GD
30	17	9	4	57	29	+28	60	8	4	3	26	16	+10	9	5	1	31	13	+18

Source: Soccerway

===== Results by round =====
Round	1	2	3	4	5	6	7	8	9	10	11	12	13	14	15	16	17	18	19	20	21	22	23	24	25	26	27	28	29	30
Ground	H	A	H	A	H	A	H	A	H	A	H	A	H	A	H	A	H	A	H	A	H	A	H	A	H	A	H	A	H	A
Result	D	W	W	W	W	W	W	D	D	D	L	D	D	W	L	W	W	D	W	W	W	W	L	D	W	W	W	W	D	L
Position	7	3	2	3	2	2	1	2	2	2	3	3	3	3	3	3	3	3	3	3	3	3	3	3	3	3	3	3	3	3
Points	1	4	7	10	13	16	19	20	21	22	22	23	24	27	27	30	33	34	37	40	43	46	46	47	50	53	56	59	60	60

Source: Worldfootball
A = Away; H = Home; W = Win; D = Draw; L = Loss

===== Matches =====
29 July 2023 1	TSC	3–3	Partizan	Bačka Topola
21:00 CEST (UTC+2)	Antonić 12'; Đakovac 45+5' (pen.); Stojić 90+6'	Report	Natcho 40'; Belić 43'; Saldanha 79'	Stadium: TSC Arena; Referee: M. Mitic

3 August 2023 2	Radnički Niš	0–3	TSC	Niš
17:55 CEST (UTC+2)		Report	Ćirković 63'; Rakonjac 83'; Kuveljić 90'	Stadium: Čair Stadium; Attendance: 400; Referee: L. Lukic

12 August 2023 3	TSC	1–0	Radnički 1923	Bačka Topola
18:55 CEST (UTC+2)	Sa. Jovanović 85'	Report		Stadium: TSC Arena; Attendance: 700; Referee: I. Stamenkovic

20 August 2023 4	Javor-Matis	0–3	TSC	Ivanjica
19:30 CEST (UTC+2)		Report	Stanić 20' (pen.); Sa. Jovanović 37'; Pantović 45' (pen.)	Stadium: Javor Stadium; Attendance: 450; Referee: M. Milanovic

26 August 2023 5	TSC	1–0	IMT	Bačka Topola
18:00 CEST (UTC+2)	Mirchevski 86'	Report		Stadium: TSC Arena; Attendance: 1,200; Referee: M. Ilic

1 September 2023 6	Radnik Surdulica	0–1	TSC	Surdulica
19:00 CEST (UTC+2)		Report	Stojić 45+1'	Stadium: Surdulica City Stadium; Attendance: 700; Referee: P. Tomic

16 September 2023 7	TSC	6–3	Železničar	Bačka Topola
19:00 CEST (UTC+2)	Đakovac 3', 10'; Stanić 37'; Cvetinović 67'; Pantović 77'; Vulić 90+3'	Report	A. Đorđević 55', 80'; Šušnjar 90'	Stadium: TSC Arena; Attendance: 1,000; Referee: M. Ivkovic

30 September 2023 10	Mladost Lučani	1–1	TSC	Lučani
19:00 CEST (UTC+2)	Tumbasević 90+1'	Report	Pantović 28'	Stadium: Mladost Stadium; Attendance: 300; Referee: I. Stamenkovic

8 October 2023 11	TSC	0–2	Spartak Subotica	Bačka Topola
17:30 CEST (UTC+2)		Report	Ubiparip 52'; Todoroski 66'	Stadium: TSC Arena; Attendance: 2,000; Referee: P. Janjus

21 October 2023 12	Voždovac	1–1	TSC	Belgrade
19:00 CEST (UTC+2)	Burmaz 90+2' (pen.)	Report	Sa. Jovanović 65'	Stadium: Stadium Voždovac; Referee: M. Milanovic

29 October 2023 13	TSC	1–1	Novi Pazar	Bačka Topola
19:00 CET (UTC+1)	Milovanović 83'	Report	Lazić 55'	Stadium: TSC Arena; Attendance: 1,700; Referee: A. Zivkovic

1 November 2023 8	Red Star Belgrade	1–1	TSC	Belgrade
19:00 CET (UTC+1)	Katai 84'	Report	Đakovac 90+1'	Stadium: Rajko Mitić Stadium; Attendance: 7,500; Referee: M. Mitic

5 November 2023 14	Čukarički	0–2	TSC	Belgrade
15:30 CET (UTC+1)		Report	Ćirković 23'; Cvetković 83'	Stadium: Čukarički Stadium; Referee: P. Ilic

12 November 2023 15	TSC	1–2	Vojvodina	Bačka Topola
19:30 CET (UTC+1)	Ćirković 1'	Report	Radulović 19', 29'	Stadium: TSC Arena; Attendance: 2,500; Referee: M. Stefanovic

25 November 2023 16	Partizan	0–4	TSC	Belgrade
18:30 CET (UTC+1)		Report	Ćirković 3'; Stojić 11'; Radin 32'; Milovanović 49'	Stadium: Partizan Stadium; Attendance: 4,097; Referee: P. Ilic

3 December 2023 17	TSC	1–0	Radnički Niš	Bačka Topola
17:00 CET (UTC+1)	Đakovac 76'	Report		Stadium: TSC Arena; Referee: M. Markovic

9 December 2023 18	Radnički 1923	0–0	TSC	Kragujevac
13:00 CET (UTC+1)		Report		Stadium: Čika Dača Stadium; Referee: S. Jovanovic

18 December 2023 19	TSC	3–0	Javor-Matis	Bačka Topola
16:00 CET (UTC+1)	Đakovac 28'; Rakonjac 45+2'; Pantović 81'	Report		Stadium: TSC Arena; Referee: M. Ilic

22 December 2023 9	TSC	1–1	Napredak Kruševac	Bačka Topola
17:00 CET (UTC+1)	Milovanović 9'	Report	Đ. Jovanović 61'	Stadium: TSC Arena; Attendance: 800; Referee: M. Stefanovic

11 February 2024 20	IMT	0–2	TSC	Belgrade
15:00 CET (UTC+1)		Report	Pantović 71'; Sós 83' (pen.)	Stadium: Stadium Voždovac; Attendance: 300; Referee: M. Milanovic

18 February 2024 21	TSC	1–0	Radnik Surdulica	Bačka Topola
17:00 CET (UTC+1)	Đakovac 69' (pen.)	Report		Stadium: TSC Arena; Attendance: 1,000; Referee: M. Ivkovic

24 February 2024 22	Železničar	2–3	TSC	Pančevo
18:30 CET (UTC+1)	St. Jovanović 61'; Kahvić 89'	Report	Ćirković 4', 59'; Pejić 19'	Stadium: SC Mladost Stadium; Attendance: 1,200; Referee: M. Stefanovic

2 March 2024 23	TSC	1–3	Red Star Belgrade	Bačka Topola
16:00 CET (UTC+1)	Pantović 62'	Report	Kanga 36' (pen.); Bukari 64'; Hwang 85' (pen.)	Stadium: TSC Arena; Referee: M. Ilic

7 March 2024 24	Napredak Kruševac	0–0	TSC	Kruševac
16:00 CET (UTC+1)		Report		Stadium: Stadion Mladost; Attendance: 800; Referee: S. Jovanovic

12 March 2024 25	TSC	4–1	Mladost Lučani	Bačka Topola
14:00 CET (UTC+1)	Ćirković 2', 68'; Pantović 58'; Sa. Jovanović 71'	Report	Veličković 75'	Stadium: TSC Arena; Attendance: 500; Referee: A. Stojanovic

16 March 2024 26	Spartak Subotica	2–4	TSC	Subotica
18:00 CET (UTC+1)	Mijić 58'; Ubiparip 65'	Report	Radin 18'; Ćirković 29', 74'; Sa. Jovanović 55'	Stadium: Subotica City Stadium; Attendance: 1,000; Referee: D. Nikolic

29 March 2024 27	TSC	2–0	Voždovac	Bačka Topola
18:00 CET (UTC+1)	Vulić 42'; Ćirković 44'	Report		Stadium: TSC Arena; Attendance: 1,500; Referee: P. Ilic

2 April 2024 28	Novi Pazar	3–4	TSC	Novi Pazar
16:30 CEST (UTC+2)	Ljajić 11', 15' (pen.), 90+4'	Report	Pantović 9'; Ćirković 24'; Milosavljević 51', 55'	Stadium: Novi Pazar City Stadium; Attendance: 2,000; Referee: M. Mitic

6 April 2024 29	TSC	0–0	Čukarički	Bačka Topola
20:00 CEST (UTC+2)		Report		Stadium: TSC Arena; Attendance: 1,300; Referee: S. Jovanovic

14 April 2024 30	Vojvodina	3–2	TSC	Novi Sad
16:30 CEST (UTC+2)	Zukić 9'; Campbell 44'; Nj. Petrović 90+5'	Report	Đakovac 49'; Sa. Jovanović 79'	Stadium: Karađorđe Stadium; Attendance: 5,300; Referee: M. Stefanovic

==== Championship round ====
===== Championship round table =====
Pos	Team	Pld	W	D	L	GF	GA	GD	Pts	Qualification
1	Red Star Belgrade (C)	37	31	3	3	94	28	+66	96	Qualification for the Champions League play-off round
2	Partizan	37	24	6	7	80	48	+32	78	Qualification for the Champions League second qualifying round
3	TSC	37	22	9	6	75	39	+36	75	Qualification for the Europa League play-off round (Note: The winner of the 2023–24 Serbian Cup, Red Star Belgrade, has already qualified for 2024–25 UEFA Champions League, so the berth is awarded to third place TSC.)
4	Vojvodina	37	17	10	10	62	50	+12	61	Qualification for the Europa League second qualifying round
5	Radnički 1923	37	19	4	14	64	61	+3	61	Qualification for the Conference League second qualifying round

Source: SuperLiga (in Serbian)
Rules for classification: 1) Points; 2) Points in regular season; 3) Head-to-head points in regular season; 4) Head-to-head goal difference in regular season; 5) Head-to-head goals scored in regular season; 6) Head-to-head away goals scored in regular season (if two teams tied); 7) Goal difference; 8) Goals scored; 9) Fair play ranking; 10) Drawing of lots.
(C) Champions

===== Results summary =====
Overall								Home						Away					
Pld	W	D	L	GF	GA	GD	Pts	W	D	L	GF	GA	GD	W	D	L	GF	GA	GD
7	5	0	2	18	10	+8	15	4	0	0	15	5	+10	1	0	2	3	5	−2

Source: Worldfootball

===== Results by round =====
Round	31	32	33	34	35	36	37
Ground	H	A	A	H	H	A	H
Result	W	W	L	W	W	L	W
Position	3	3	3	3	3	3	3
Points	63	66	66	69	72	72	75

Source: Worldfootball
A = Away; H = Home; W = Win; D = Draw; L = Loss

===== Matches =====
20 April 2024 31	TSC	3–2	Vojvodina	Bačka Topola
15:00 CEST (UTC+2)	Pantović 3', 74'; Ćirković 5'	Report	Zukić 13'; Ivanović 61'	Stadium: TSC Arena; Attendance: 2,000; Referee: M. Ivkovic

28 April 2024 32	Partizan	1–2	TSC	Belgrade
19:30 CEST (UTC+2)	Natcho 35'	Report	Ćirković 32'; Sa. Jovanović 77'	Stadium: Partizan Stadium; Attendance: 1,000; Referee: N. Minakovic

2 May 2024 33	Red Star Belgrade	2–1	TSC	Belgrade
19:00 CEST (UTC+2)	Olayinka 55'; Ndiaye 75'	Report	Milosavljević 50'	Stadium: Rajko Mitić Stadium; Attendance: 5,000; Referee: M. Ilic

8 May 2024 34	TSC	4–3	Radnički 1923	Bačka Topola
16:00 CEST (UTC+2)	Sa. Jovanović 7'; Đakovac 10', 56' (pen.); Stojić 16'	Report	Sahli 61'; Gluščević 78'; Bukumira 90+1'	Stadium: TSC Arena; Attendance: 1,200; Referee: P. Tomic

12 May 2024 35	TSC	2–0	Čukarički	Bačka Topola
14:30 CEST (UTC+2)	Stanić 5'; Đakovac 28'	Report		Stadium: TSC Arena; Attendance: 2,400; Referee: D. Trifkovic

17 May 2024 36	Mladost Lučani	2–0	TSC	Lučani
18:30 CEST (UTC+2)	Veličković 15'; Varjačić 54'	Report		Stadium: Mladost Stadium; Attendance: 300; Referee: A. Stojanovic

23 May 2024 37	TSC	6–0	Napredak Kruševac	Bačka Topola
18:30 CEST (UTC+2)	Ćirković 6', 79'; Stanić 42', 52'; Pantović 59'; Sós 81'	Report		Stadium: TSC Arena; Attendance: 1,200; Referee: I. Stamenkovic

=== Serbian Cup ===
18 October 2023 Round of 32	Smederevo 1924	1–1 (4–3 p)	TSC	Smederevo
14:00 CEST (UTC+2)	Cvetinović 70' (o.g.)	Report	Vlalukin 76'	Stadium: Smederevo Stadium
Note: Smederevo 1924 won 4–3 on penalties.

=== UEFA Champions League ===
==== Qualifying ====
===== Third qualifying round =====
8 August 2023 First leg	Braga (Portugal)	3–0	(Serbia) TSC	Braga, Portugal
20:00 WEST (UTC+1)	Bruma 17'; Pizzi 19'; Al-Musrati (yellow card) 74'; Djaló 87'	Report	M. Đorđević (yellow card) 5'; Ne. Petrović (yellow card) 43'	Stadium: Estádio Municipal; Attendance: 22,186; Referee: Harald Lechner (Austria); Assistant referees: Andreas Heidenreich (Austria), Maximilian Kolbitsch (Austria); Fourth official: Christian-Petru Ciochirca (Austria)

15 August 2023 Second leg	TSC (Serbia)	1–4 (1–7 agg.)	(Portugal) Braga	Bačka Topola, Serbia
20:00 CEST (UTC+2)	M. Đorđević (yellow card) 22'; Rakonjac 40'; Pantović (yellow card) 47'	Report	Pizzi 9'; Bruma 13'; Djaló 16'; Al-Musrati 20'	Stadium: TSC Arena; Attendance: 4,200; Referee: Jakob Kehlet (Denmark); Assistant referees: Lars Hummelgaard (Denmark), Victor Skytte (Denmark); Fourth official: Aydin Uslu (Denmark)
Note: Braga won 7–1 on aggregate.

=== UEFA Europa League ===
==== Group stage ====
Pos	Team	Pld	W	D	L	GF	GA	GD	Pts	Qualification	WHU	FRE	OLY	TSC
1	(England) West Ham United	6	5	0	1	10	4	+6	15	Advance to round of 16	—	2–0	1–0	3–1
2	(Germany) SC Freiburg	6	4	0	2	17	7	+10	12	Advance to knockout round play-offs	1–2	—	5–0	5–0
3	(Greece) Olympiacos	6	2	1	3	11	14	−3	7	Transfer to Europa Conference League	2–1	2–3	—	5–2
4	(Serbia) TSC	6	0	1	5	6	19	−13	1		0–1	1–3	2–2	—

Source: UEFA
Rules for classification: Group stage tiebreakers

21 September 2023 1	West Ham United (England)	3–1	(Serbia) TSC	London, England
20:00 BST (UTC+1)	Kehrer (yellow card) 41'; Kudus 66', 70'; Souček 82'	Report	Kuveljić (yellow card) 32'; Stanić 48'	Stadium: London Stadium; Attendance: 41,374; Referee: Filip Glova (Slovakia); Assistant referees: Daniel Polacek (Slovakia), Peter Bednar (Slovakia); Fourth official: Michal Očenáš (Slovakia)

5 October 2023 2	TSC (Serbia)	2–2	(Greece) Olympiacos	Bačka Topola, Serbia
18:45 CEST (UTC+2)	Đakovac 63'; Pantović 90', (yellow card) 90+3'	Report	Masouras 16'; Podence 57'; Ntoi (red card) 71'; Paschalakis (yellow card) 85'	Stadium: TSC Arena; Attendance: 3,778; Referee: Benoît Bastien (France); Assistant referees: Hicham Zakrani (France), Aurélien Berthomieu (France); Fourth official: Ruddy Buquet (France)

26 October 2023 3	TSC (Serbia)	1–3	(Germany) SC Freiburg	Bačka Topola, Serbia
18:45 CEST (UTC+2)	Petrović 13'; Cvetković (yellow card) 60'; Vlalukin (yellow card) 89'; Čalušić (yellow card) 90+2'	Report	Grifo 49' (pen.), 59', 73'; Lienhart (yellow card) 89'	Stadium: TSC Arena; Attendance: 3,400; Referee: Aliyar Aghayev (Azerbaijan); Assistant referees: Zeynal Zeynalov (Azerbaijan), Akif Amirali (Azerbaijan); Fourth official: Kamal Umudlu (Azerbaijan)

9 November 2023 4	SC Freiburg (Germany)	5–0	(Serbia) TSC	Freiburg im Breisgau, Germany
21:00 CET (UTC+1)	Röhl 24'; Lienhart (yellow card) 39'; Eggestein 56'; Weißhaupt 69'; Adamu 80'; Dōan 90+2'	Report	Vlalukin (yellow card) 29'	Stadium: Europa-Park Stadion; Attendance: 31,700; Referee: Rohit Saggi (Norway); Assistant referees: Morten Jense (Norway), Anders Olav Dale (Norway); Fourth official: Kai Erik Steen (Norway)

30 November 2023 5	TSC (Serbia)	0–1	(England) West Ham United	Bačka Topola, Serbia
18:45 CET (UTC+1)	Petrović (yellow card) 45'; Čalušić (yellow card) 63'	Report	Fornals (yellow card) 55'; Emerson (yellow card) 87'; Souček 89'	Stadium: TSC Arena; Attendance: 4,256; Referee: Allard Lindhout (Netherlands); Assistant referees: Rogier Honig, Patrick Inia; Fourth official: Jannick Van Der Laan

14 December 2023 6	Olympiacos (Greece)	5–2	(Serbia) TSC	Piraeus, Greece
22:00 EET (UTC+2)	El Kaabi 21'; Podence 40', 42'; Ilić 46' (o.g.); El-Arabi 68'	Report	Kuveljić (yellow card) 30' (yellow-red card) 60'; Đakovac 48'; Radin (yellow card) 50'; Ćirković 61'; Sós (yellow card) 76'; Krstić (yellow card) 81'	Stadium: Karaiskakis Stadium; Attendance: 20; Referee: Morten Krogh (Denmark); Assistant referees: D. Wollenberg Rasmussen, Steffen Bramsen; Fourth official: Peter Kjærsgaard (Denmark)
