= Todoroski =

Todoroski (Macedonian: Тодороски) is a Macedonian surname. Notable people with the surname include:

- Andrej Todoroski (born 1999), Macedonian footballer
- Todor Todoroski (born 1999), Macedonian footballer
