= Jorgić =

Jorgić is a Serbian surname. Notable people with the surname include:

- Darko Jorgić (born 1998), Slovenian table tennis player
- Nemanja Jorgić (born 1988), Serbian professional footballer
- Nikola Jorgić (1946–2014), Bosnian Serb soldier, war criminal
