= Josip Ćalušić =

Croatian footballer

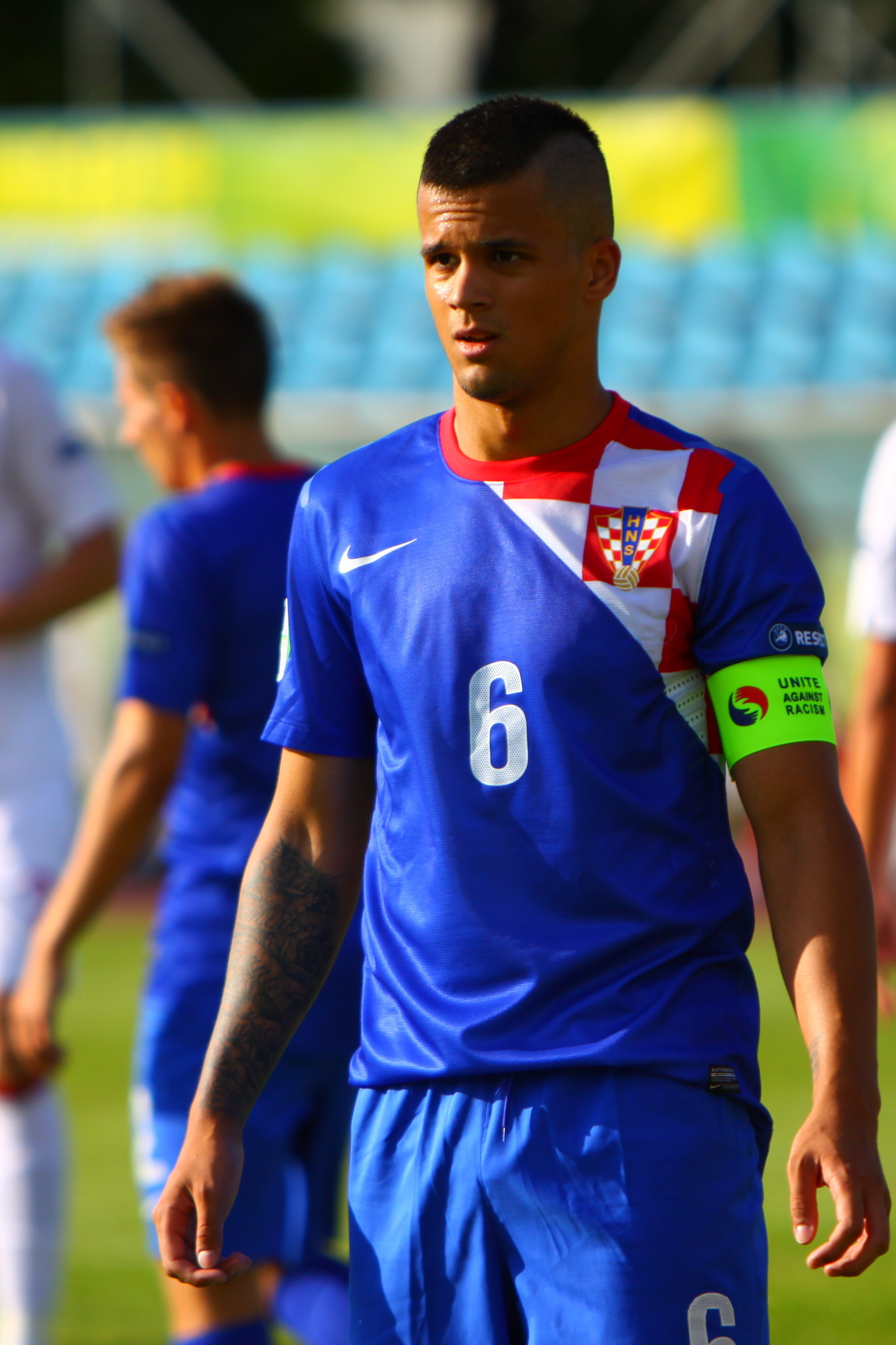
- Ćalušić in 2012

Personal information
- Date of birth: 11 October 1993 (age 33)
- Place of birth: Split, Croatia
- Height: 1.87 m (6 ft 2 in)
- Position: Centre-back

Youth career
- 2004–2005: Hajduk Split
- 2005–2006: Omladinac Vranjic
- 2007: Solin
- 2007–2009: Hajduk Split
- 2009–2010: Omladinac Vranjic
- 2010–2011: Dinamo Zagreb

Senior career*
Years	Team	Apps	(Gls)
2011–2012	Lokomotiva Zagreb	0	(0)
2011–2012	→ Radnik Sesvete (loan)	33	(0)
2013–2016	Dinamo Zagreb	5	(0)
2014–2015	→ Lokomotiva Zagreb (loan)	28	(0)
2016	→ Lokomotiva Zagreb (loan)	0	(0)
2016–2019	Dinamo Zagreb II	15	(0)
2019–2021	Celje	48	(1)
2021–2024	TSC	64	(2)
2024–2026	Konyaspor	14	(0)

International career^{‡}
2008	Croatia U15	3	(0)
2009	Croatia U16	3	(0)
2011–2012	Croatia U19	16	(0)
2012–2013	Croatia U20	6	(0)
2013–2014	Croatia U21	2	(0)
- * Club domestic league appearances and goals as of 10 June 2026 ‡ National team caps and goals as of 24 March 2013

Josip Ćalušić (born 11 October 1993) is a Croatian footballer who plays as a centre-back. He has also represented Croatia at youth level.

== Club career ==
Ćalušić made his league debut for Dinamo Zagreb on 27 February 2013 against Hajduk Split.

Most of his career has been linked with "Zagreb blues", specially their reserves teams, all until summer 2019, when he signed for Slovenian club NK Celje. In his second season there he managed to win the Slovenian Championship and made him earn interest from several clubs, leading to him choosing to join TSC Bačka Topola, a newly established Serbian SuperLiga club which already by then showed traces of serious contender for the top spots of the league and as one of the more organised and structured clubs. Within 2 seasons, Ćalušic and TSC qualified for the 2023–24 UEFA Champions League as a second placed club in the 2022–23 Serbian SuperLiga.

On 8 January 2024, Ćalušić joined J1 League club Kashima Antlers on a permanent deal, but on 19 January, the official contract was not signed because a medical check revealed an abnormality.

== Honours ==
Dinamo Zagreb

- Croatian First League: 2012–13
- Croatian Super Cup: 2013

Celje

- Slovenian PrvaLiga: 2019–20
