= Nikola Bukumira =

Serbian footballer

Personal information
- Full name: Nikola Bukumira
- Date of birth: 7 September 2005 (age 21)
- Place of birth: Kraljevo, Serbia and Montenegro
- Height: 1.81 m (5 ft 11 in)
- Position: Defensive midfielder

Team information
- Current team: Radnički 1923
- Number: 32

Youth career
- FK Kiker
- Radnički 1923

Senior career*
Years	Team	Apps	(Gls)
2023–	Radnički 1923	44	(1)
- * Club domestic league appearances and goals as of 5 June 2026

Nikola Bukumira (Serbian Cyrillic: Никола Букумира; born 7 September 2005) is a Serbian professional footballer who plays as a defensive midfielder for Serbian SuperLiga club Radnički 1923.

== Club career ==
Born in Kraljevo, Bukumira is a product of the Radnički 1923 youth system. On 6 November 2023, in a match against Spartak Subotica, he made his official debut in the Serbian SuperLiga. On 8 May 2024, in a match against TSC Nikola scored his first goal for Radnički 1923.
