= Andreja Stojanović =

Serbian footballer (born 1998)

Personal information
- Full name: Andreja Stojanović
- Date of birth: 12 November 1998 (age 27)
- Place of birth: Belgrade, FR Yugoslavia
- Height: 1.83 m (6 ft 0 in)
- Position: Left-back

Team information
- Current team: Čukarički
- Number: 3

Youth career
- Čukarički
- Zemun

Senior career*
| Years | Team | Apps | (Gls) |
| 2018–2020 | Zemun | 20 | (2) |
| 2018 | → Jedinstvo Ub (loan) | 10 | (0) |
| 2020–2022 | Kolubara | 56 | (9) |
| 2022–2025 | Radnički Niš | 75 | (2) |
| 2025– | Čukarički | 17 | (2) |
- * Club domestic league appearances and goals as of 12 June 2026

Andreja Stojanović (Serbian Cyrillic: Андреја Стојановић; born 12 November 1998) is a Serbian professional footballer who plays as a left-back for Čukarički.

== Zemun ==
Born in Belgrade, Serbia, As a member of the Čukarički youth team, Stojanović was part of the team that qualified for the UEFA Youth League, having previously won the Serbian Youth League for the 2015–16 season. In the final round of that competition, played at the Rajko Mitić Stadium, Stojanović scored in his team's 3–1 win over local side Red Star Belgrade. Stojanović remained with Čukarički for the following season, but spent most of it sidelined due to a back injury . In the summer of 2017, he terminated his scholarship contract with the club and joined Zemun. He trained with the first team at that club during the first part of the following calendar year, under coach Milan Milanović, but until the end of the 2017–18 season He did not play in official matches in the Serbian SuperLiga, nor in the Serbian Cup. Later, in August of the same year, Stojanović was loaned to Jedinstvo Ub, for the competition in the Serbian League West in the 2018/19 season . After the first part of the season, the one-year loan agreement was amicably terminated during the winter break, after which the player returned to the Zemun team. Stojanović made his debut in professional competition at the opening of the spring part of the 2018/19 season, coming on as a substitute for the injured Nemanja Vučić in the 29th minute of the match against Rad, at the Kralj Petar Prvi Stadium. Stojanović later came on as a substitute against Radnički Niš, while his first match on the pitch came in the 28th round of the Serbian Super League, away to Voždovac. After Zemun's relegation to the Serbian First League, Stojanović played the 2019–20. started as a member of the first team, and scored his first goal for the club in the second round of that competition, against Sinđelić Beograd. He scored his second goal of the season in a win over Trayal in the 20th round.

== Kolubara ==
In early 2020, Stojanović returned to Kolubara, for whose youth teams he had played several years earlier. He made his debut in the opening game of the spring season, against Dinamo Vranje in Vranje, when he was in the starting lineup of coach Zoran Milinković. Three rounds of matches were played in the Serbian First League, after which, on 15 March of the same year, a decision was announced to declare a state of emergency in the entire country, due to the coronavirus epidemic. Accordingly, the Football Association of Serbia informed the public that all events under the auspices of that organization had been canceled from that moment on and that clubs should follow further instructions from the competent institutions. The Kolubara football club further suspended all activities of the playing staff, and after a break, training began in early May. The competition in the Serbian First League resumed on 30 May, when Metalac Gornji Milanovac from Gornji Milanovac visited Lazarevac. In that match, he scored one of his team's three goals in the victory. He also scored in the season-ending away defeat to Žarkovo, with a score of 2:1. At the beginning of the 2020–21 season, Stojanović scored 4 goals in the opening three matches. The opponents were Loznica, Dinamo Vranje, and Trayal from Kruševac. By the end of the season, he had several more assistants. Kolubara finished the season in second place and achieved a historic promotion to the Serbian Superliga. In the 16th round of the 2021/22 season, Stojanović assisted Vasilije Bakić in a narrow victory over Napredak Kruševac. He scored three goals, two of which came against Mladost Lučani., and once against Kragujevac club Radnički 1923.

== Radnicki Niš ==
During July 2022, the media reported on a possible transfer of Stojanović to Radnički Niš. The deal was finalized at the end of the same month and Stojanović moved to that club. He made his debut in a home defeat to TSC from Bačka Topola in the 4th round of the Serbian SuperLiga. He assisted on Saša Marjanović's first goal in a win over Napredak Kruševac in the 8th round of the Serbian SuperLiga. He was also an assistant in a win over Spartak Subotica in the 12th round of the Serbian SuperLiga championship. He played regularly until the end of the same calendar year. During the winter break, coach Nenad Lalatović played Basile Yamkam at left-back, who played in that position in the rest of the season instead of Stojanović. He explained his decision by saying that the team had gained in strength and agility.

== Čukarički ==
On 26 May 2025, After eight years spent in Radnički Niš Stojanović decided to back to Čukarički and to sign a three-year contract, with his boyhood club.

On 19 July 2025, He made his official debut as a starter in a home win over to Napredak Kruševac in the 1th opening round of the new season of the Serbian SuperLiga.

== Literature ==
- Фудбал, број 31 (PDF). fss.rs. 2017.
- Фудбал, број 32 (PDF). fss.rs. 2018.
- Фудбал, број 6 (PDF). fss.rs. 2019.
