= Jovan Vlalukin =

Serbian footballer

Personal information
- Full name: Jovan Vlalukin
- Date of birth: 21 May 1999 (age 27)
- Place of birth: Novi Sad, FR Yugoslavia
- Height: 1.76 m (5 ft 9 in)
- Position: Full-back

Team information
- Current team: Železničar Inđija

Youth career
- Partizan

Senior career*
| Years | Team | Apps | (Gls) |
| 2018–2019 | Partizan | 0 | (0) |
| 2018–2019 | → Teleoptik (loan) | 43 | (3) |
| 2019–2022 | Metalac Gornji Milanovac | 74 | (0) |
| 2022–2023 | RFS | 26 | (1) |
| 2023–2025 | TSC | 20 | (0) |
| 2025 | Dinamo Jug | 5 | (0) |
| 2026– | Železničar Inđija | 0 | (0) |

International career^{‡}
| 2015 | Serbia U17 | 1 | (0) |
| 2017–2018 | Serbia U19 | 4 | (0) |
| 2020 | Serbia U21 | 2 | (0) |
| 2021 | Serbia | 2 | (0) |
- * Club domestic league appearances and goals as of 3 October 2025 ‡ National team caps and goals as of 29 January 2021

Jovan Vlalukin (Serbian Cyrillic: Јован Влалукин; born 21 May 1999) is a Serbian professional footballer who plays as a full-back for Železničar Inđija after moving from Dinamo Jug whom he joined from TSC.

== International career ==
Vlalukin was capped twice by Serbia in January 2021 friendly matches in Latin America.
