= Milorad Kojić =

Serbian footballer

Personal information
- Date of birth: 3 February 1999 (age 27)
- Place of birth: Niš, FR Yugoslavia
- Height: 1.90 m (6 ft 3 in)
- Position: Goalkeeper

Youth career
- Železničar Niš
- Radnički Niš

Senior career*
Years	Team	Apps	(Gls)
2018–2022	Radnički Niš	13	(0)
2018	→ Jedinstvo Bošnjace (loan)	14	(0)
2019	→ Timočanin (loan)		
2020	→ Radnički Pirot (loan)	6	(0)
2022–2023	IMT	52	(0)
2023–2014	Dubočica	5	(0)
- * Club domestic league appearances and goals as of 13 September 2024

Milorad Kojić (Serbian Cyrillic: Милорад Којић; born 3 February 1999) is a Serbian professional footballer who plays as a goalkeeper.

== Club career ==
Born in Niš, Milorad passed Železničar Niš and Radnički Niš youth categories. His official debut for Radnički Niš was in the 4 fixture match of the 2018–19 Serbian SuperLiga season against Voždovac, after Bulajić's injury in the 9th minute of the match, played on 11 August 2018.
