= Viktor Lukić =

Serbian footballer (born 2000)

Personal information
- Date of birth: 6 October 2000 (age 26)
- Place of birth: Šabac, FR Yugoslavia
- Height: 1.72 m (5 ft 8 in)
- Position: Winger

Team information
- Current team: GOŠK Gabela
- Number: 8

Youth career
- Partizan
- 2016–2019: Brodarac

Senior career*
Years	Team	Apps	(Gls)
2019–2020	Čukarički	1	(0)
2020–2022	Radnik Surdulica	72	(3)
2023–2024	Diagoras	40	(3)
2024–	GOŠK Gabela	19	(1)

International career^{‡}
2020	Serbia U21	1	(0)
- * Club domestic league appearances and goals as of 10 June 2025 ‡ National team caps and goals as of 13 October 2020

Viktor Lukić (Serbian Cyrillic: Виктор Лукић; born 6 October 2000) is a Serbian professional footballer who plays as a winger for Bosnian Premier League club GOŠK Gabela.
