= Nenad Radonjić =

Serbian footballer

Personal information
- Date of birth: 19 March 1996 (age 30)
- Place of birth: Belgrade, FR Yugoslavia
- Height: 1.74 m (5 ft 9 in)
- Positions: Striker; winger

Youth career
- Voždovac

Senior career*
Years	Team	Apps	(Gls)
2015–2016	Voždovac	1	(0)
2015–2016	→ Radnički Beograd (loan)		
2016–2018	Radnički Beograd		
2018	IMT		
2019	Kolubara	18	(0)
2020	Radnički Kragujevac	5	(0)
2020–2021	Radnički Sremska Mitrovica	9	(2)
2021	Žarkovo	12	(1)
2021	Bačka Palanka	14	(0)
- * Club domestic league appearances and goals as of 26 December 2021

Nenad Radonjić (Serbian Cyrillic: Ненад Радоњић; born 19 March 1996) is a Serbian retired footballer who played as a forward.
