= Aleksa Jovanović (footballer) =

Serbian footballer

Personal information
- Full name: Aleksa Jovanović
- Date of birth: 27 May 1999 (age 27)
- Place of birth: Bor, FR Yugoslavia
- Height: 1.87 m (6 ft 2 in)
- Position: Defensive midfielder

Team information
- Current team: Grobiņa
- Number: 15

Youth career
- 2006–2015: OFK Bor
- 2015–2016: Radnički Niš

Senior career*
Years	Team	Apps	(Gls)
2016–2020	Radnički Niš	34	(0)
2017	→ Dinamo Vranje (loan)	1	(1)
2020–2022	Inđija	64	(1)
2022–2025	Grafičar	83	(1)
2025	Makedonija GP	12	(0)
2026	Dubočica	15	(1)
2026–	Grobiņa	13	(0)

International career
2016	Serbia U18	1	(0)
- * Club domestic league appearances and goals as of 12 November 2026

Aleksa Jovanović (Serbian Cyrillic: Алекса Јовановић; born 27 May 1999) is a Serbian footballer who plays as a midfielder for Latvian Higher League club Grobiņa.

== Club career ==
=== Radnički Niš ===
Born 1999, Jovanović passed the youth categories of OFK Bor, and after 9 years he moved to Radnički Niš. He joined the first team of Radnički Niš for the spring half of 2015–16 season, and made his SuperLiga debut in a match against Partizan on 6 March 2016 at Čair Stadium.

== International career ==
Jovanović received call-ups from Slavoljub Muslin to the Serbia national team for 2018 FIFA World Cup qualification matches but did not make an appearance.

== Career statistics ==
As of 5 November 2017

Appearances and goals by club, season and competition
Club	Season	League			Cup		Continental		Other		Total	
Club	Season	Division	Apps	Goals	Apps	Goals	Apps	Goals	Apps	Goals	Apps	Goals
Radnički Niš	2015–16	SuperLiga	3	0	0	0	—		—		3	0
Radnički Niš	2016–17	SuperLiga	14	0	0	0	—		—		14	0
Radnički Niš	2017–18	SuperLiga	1	0	0	0	—		—		1	0
Radnički Niš	Total		18	0	0	0	—		—		18	0
