= TSC Arena =

Football stadium in Bačka Topola, Serbia

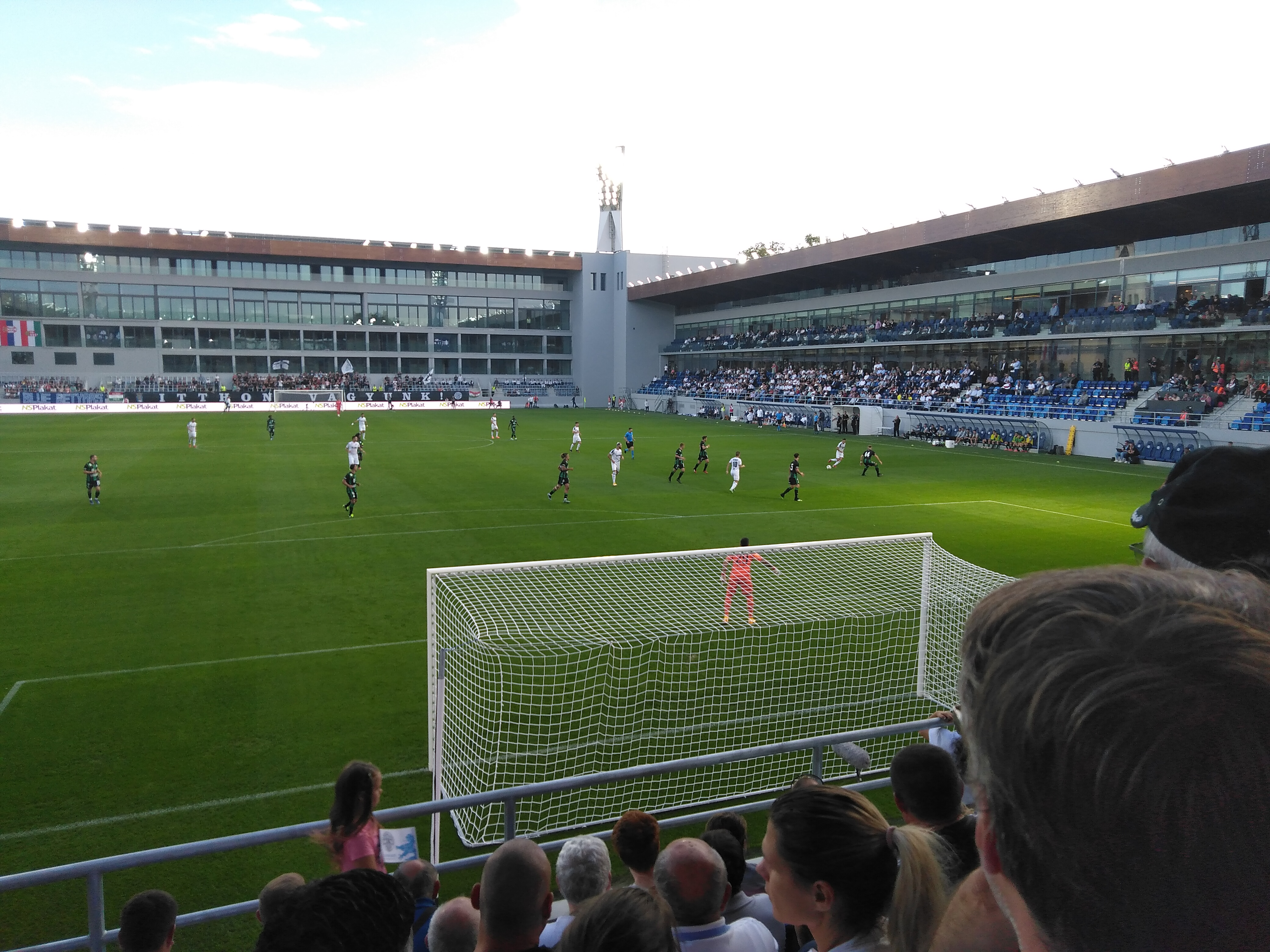
- Interactive map of TSC Arena
- Location: Bačka Topola, Serbia
- Coordinates: 45.815881°N 19.627569°E
- Owner: FK TSC
- Operator: FK TSC
- Capacity: 4,500
- Surface: Hybrid grass
- Scoreboard: LED

Construction
- Groundbreaking: September 2018
- Built: 2018–2021
- Opened: 3 September 2021
- Cost: €15 million

Tenants
- FK TSC (2021–present): Major sporting events hosted; 2027 UEFA European Under-21 Championship

TSC Arena (Serbian Cyrillic: ТСЦ Арена) is a football stadium in Bačka Topola, Serbia. It is the home ground of FK TSC. The stadium consists of four stands with a total seating capacity of 4,500.

== 2026–27 UEFA Nations League ==
In 2026, the Republic of Ireland national football team chose this stadium as their "home" venue for their 2026-27 UEFA Nations League fixture against Israel.
