= Strahinja Urošević =

Serbian footballer

Personal information
- Full name: Strahinja Urošević
- Date of birth: 4 March 1996 (age 30)
- Place of birth: Priština, FR Yugoslavia
- Height: 1.84 m (6 ft 0 in)
- Position: Midfielder

Team information
- Current team: Šumadija 1903

Youth career
- Sloga Kraljevo
- Borac Čačak
- Radnički Kragujevac

Senior career*
Years	Team	Apps	(Gls)
2015–2016	Radnički Kragujevac	33	(1)
2016–2017	Šumadija 1903		
2017–2018	Dinamo Vranje	0	(0)
2018–2019	FC Azzurri LS 90	18	(2)
2019	Sloga 33		
2020	Smederevo	6	(1)
2020	Kolubara	11	(1)
2021	Borac Čačak	0	(0)
2021–2022	Radnički Svilajnac		
2022-	Šumadija 1903		
- * Club domestic league appearances and goals as of 19:46, 7 February 2021 (UTC)

Strahinja Urošević (Serbian Cyrillic: Страхиња Урошевић; born 4 March 1996) is a Serbian football midfielder who plays for Šumadija 1903.
