= Edin Ajdinović =

Serbian footballer

Personal information
- Full name: Edin Ajdinović
- Date of birth: 7 June 2001 (age 25)
- Place of birth: Belgrade, FR Yugoslavia
- Height: 1.84 m (6 ft 0 in)
- Position: Central midfielder

Team information
- Current team: Sloven
- Number: 26

Youth career
- –2019: Red Star Belgrade
- 2019–2020: Voždovac

Senior career*
Years	Team	Apps	(Gls)
2020–2023	Voždovac	90	(3)
2023	IMT	2	(0)
2024-	Sloven	21	(0)

International career^{‡}
2022	Serbia U21	1	(0)
- * Club domestic league appearances and goals as of 25 June 2025 ‡ National team caps and goals as of 7 June 2022

Edin Ajdinović (Serbian Cyrillic: Един Ајдиновић; born 7 June 2001) is a Serbian professional footballer who plays as a central midfielder for Sloven.
