= Dušan Stević =

Serbian footballer

Personal information
- Date of birth: 17 June 1995 (age 31)
- Place of birth: Brus, FR Yugoslavia
- Height: 1.75 m (5 ft 9 in)
- Position: Right back

Youth career
- Radnički 1923

Senior career*
Years	Team	Apps	(Gls)
2014–2016	Radnički 1923	32	(4)
2014–2015	→ Šumadija 1903 (loan)		
2016–2018	Panserraikos	41	(0)
2018	Rabotnički	11	(1)
2019	Rad	19	(0)
2020	Napredak Kruševac	18	(1)
2021	Maritzburg United	11	(0)
2021–2022	Rad	34	(0)
2023	Metalac Gornji Milanovac	14	(1)
2023–2025	Trayal Kruševac	17	(0)
2025–2026	Bor	13	(0)
- * Club domestic league appearances and goals as of 13 August 2026

Dušan Stević (Serbian Cyrillic: Душан Стевић; born 17 June 1995) is a former Serbian professional footballer.

== Club career ==
=== Radnički Kragujevac ===
He made his Jelen SuperLiga debut for Radnički Kragujevac on an away match versus Čukarički on 3 May 2014. In season 2013–14, he played against Novi Pazar in fixture 29.

In August he announced that he's retiring from playing, however he is still active in football, after becoming a member of Bor technical staff as a fitness coach.
