= Miloš Zukanović =

Serbian footballer

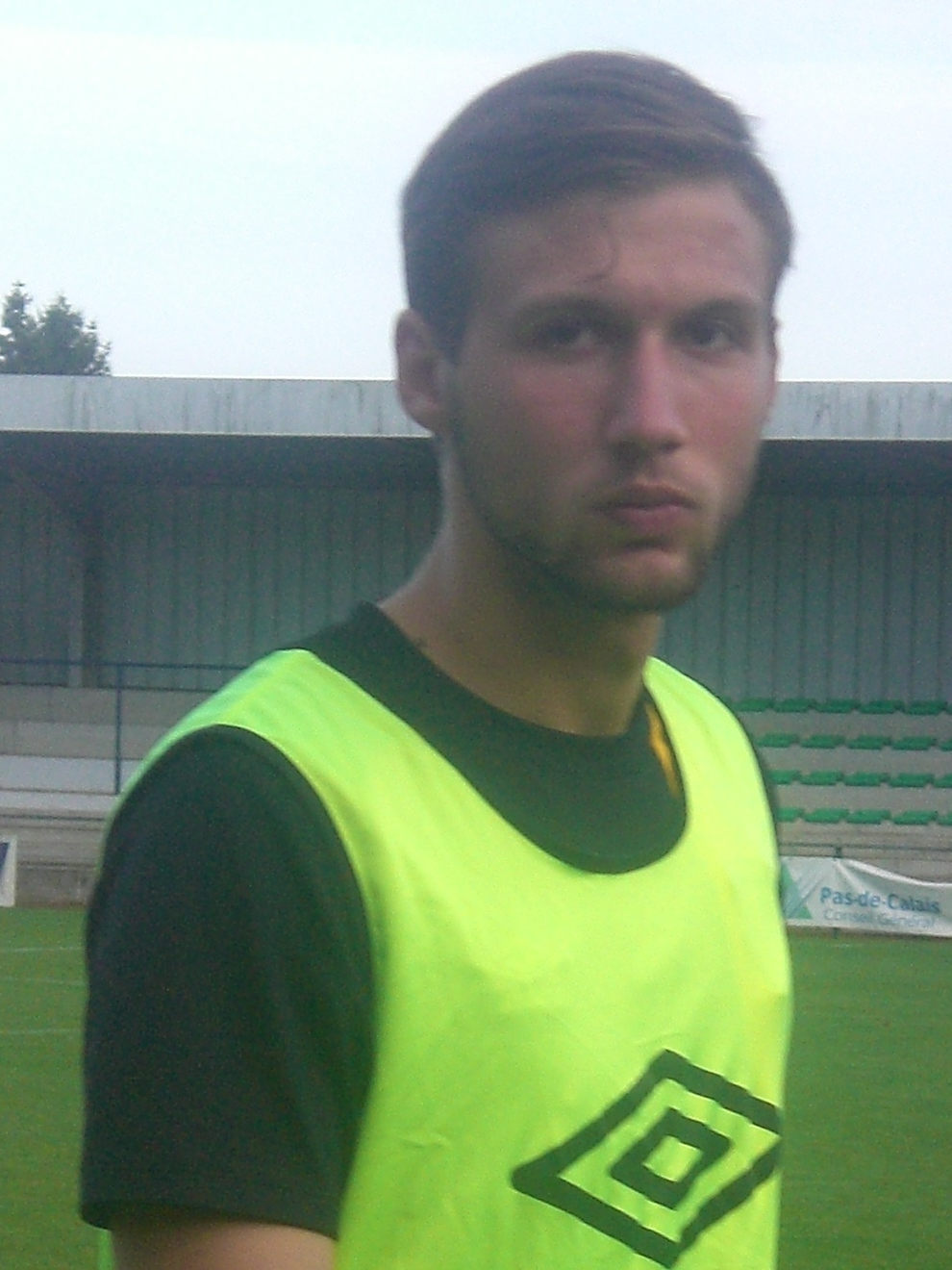
- Zukanović in August 2015

Personal information
- Date of birth: 8 February 1996 (age 30)
- Place of birth: Split, Croatia
- Height: 1.86 m (6 ft 1 in)
- Position: Forward

Youth career
- –2014: Red Star Belgrade

Senior career*
Years	Team	Apps	(Gls)
2014–2015	NAC	3	(0)
2015–2017	Lens B	37	(8)
2017–2019	Red Star Paris	12	(1)
2018	→ Entente SSG (loan)	4	(0)
2019	Napredak Kruševac	11	(1)
2020–2021	Mačva Šabac	25	(2)
2021	Radnički Kragujevac	15	(1)
2022	Gorica	6	(0)
2022–2023	Metaloglobus București	19	(7)
2023–2024	Unirea Slobozia	12	(0)
2024	Metaloglobus București	6	(0)
2024–2025	Unirea Ungheni	22	(5)
2025–2026	ASA Târgu Mureș	17	(3)

International career
2013–2014	Serbia U18	3	(2)
2014	Serbia U19	1	(0)
- * Club domestic league appearances and goals as of 13 December 2025

Miloš Zukanović (Serbian Cyrillic: Милош Зукановић; born 8 February 1996) is a Serbian professional footballer who plays as a forward.

== Career ==
Zukanović passed the youth categories of Red Star Belgrade. After he terminated the contract with club, he joined the NAC Breda, and made his professional debut in the 19th round of the 2014–15 Eredivisie, against Willem II on 25 January 2015.

In August 2015, he signed with French side Lens to play with the club's reserves.

After one year with Red Star, another French club, he returned to Serbia and signed a two-year contract with Napredak Kruševac in January 2019.

== Personal life ==
Zukanović holds Serbian and Croatian passports.

== Honours ==
Red Star

- Championnat National: 2017–18

Radnički Kragujevac

- Serbian First League: 2020–21

Gorica

- Slovenian Second League: 2021–22
