= Saša Jovanović (footballer, born 1991) =

Serbian footballer

Personal information
- Date of birth: 15 December 1991 (age 34)
- Place of birth: Belgrade, SFR Yugoslavia
- Height: 1.76 m (5 ft 9 in)
- Position: Forward

Team information
- Current team: TSC
- Number: 8

Senior career*
Years	Team	Apps	(Gls)
2009–2013	Kolubara	73	(2)
2013–2014	Smederevo	26	(4)
2014–2017	Mladost Lučani	96	(23)
2017–2019	Córdoba	49	(6)
2019–2021	Al Fateh	20	(3)
2019–2020	→ Deportivo La Coruña (loan)	11	(1)
2021–2022	Mladost Lučani	53	(11)
2022–	TSC	112	(25)

International career
2016–2017	Serbia	2	(0)
- * Club domestic league appearances and goals as of 13 June 2026

Saša Jovanović (Serbian Cyrillic: Саша Јовановић; born 15 December 1991) is a Serbian professional footballer who plays as a forward for TSC.

== Club career ==
Born in Lazarevac, Jovanović started out with his local side Kolubara. He played for his parent club for several seasons, before switching to Smederevo in mid-2013. Between 2014 and 2017, Jovanović made a name for himself at Mladost Lučani. He amassed 96 appearances and scored 23 goals in the top flight, helping them earn a spot in the 2017–18 UEFA Europa League. In August 2017, Jovanović was transferred to Spanish club Córdoba.

On 22 January 2019, Saudi club Al Fateh SC reached an agreement with Córdoba for the transfer of Jovanović. On 2 September, he returned to Spain and its second division, after signing for Deportivo de La Coruña on a one-year loan deal.

== International career ==
Jovanović was capped twice for Serbia in 2016 and 2017, in friendlies against Qatar and USA.

== Honours ==
Individual

- Serbian SuperLiga Player of the Week: 2021–22 (Round 9), 2022–23 (Round 12), 2024–25 (Round 33)
- Serbian SuperLiga Team of the Season:2022–23
- Serbian SuperLiga Player of the Season: 2022–23
