= Ivan Milosavljević (footballer, born 2000) =

Serbian footballer

Personal information
- Date of birth: 19 March 2000 (age 26)
- Place of birth: Kragujevac, FR Yugoslavia
- Height: 1.80 m (5 ft 11 in)
- Position: Central midfielder

Team information
- Current team: AEL Limassol
- Number: 19

Youth career
- Partizan

Senior career*
Years	Team	Apps	(Gls)
2018–2020	Partizan	0	(0)
2018–2019	→ Teleoptik (loan)	29	(0)
2020	→ Voždovac (loan)	4	(1)
2020–2022	Voždovac	59	(6)
2022–2025	TSC	73	(6)
2025–	AEL Limassol	39	(0)

International career^{‡}
2021	Serbia U21	6	(0)
- * Club domestic league appearances and goals as of 7 November 2026 ‡ National team caps and goals as of 16 November 2021

Ivan Milosavljević (Serbian Cyrillic: Иван Милосављевић; born 19 March 2000) is a Serbian professional footballer who plays as a central midfielder for AEL Limassol.

== Honours ==
Individual

- Serbian SuperLiga Player of the Week: 2021–22 (Round 12), 2023–24 (Round 28)
