= Veljko Ilić =

Serbian footballer

Personal information
- Date of birth: 21 July 2003 (age 23)
- Place of birth: Belgrade, Serbia and Montenegro
- Height: 1.95 m (6 ft 5 in)
- Position: Goalkeeper

Team information
- Current team: Widzew Łódź
- Number: 30

Youth career
- 2012–2014: Radnički Obrenovac
- 2014–2017: Obrenovac 1905
- 2017–2021: Red Star Belgrade
- 2021: → IMT (loan)
- 2021–2022: TSC

Senior career*
Years	Team	Apps	(Gls)
2021–2025	TSC	104	(0)
2025–	Widzew Łódź	8	(0)

International career^{‡}
2023–2024	Serbia U21	9	(0)
2026–	Serbia	1	(0)
- * Club domestic league appearances and goals as of 17:24, 29 May 2026 (UTC) ‡ National team caps and goals as of 19:51, 5 June 2026 (UTC)

Veljko Ilić (Serbian Cyrillic: Вељко Илић; born 21 July 2003) is a Serbian professional footballer who plays as a goalkeeper for Ekstraklasa club Widzew Łódź and the Serbia national team.

== Club career ==
Ilić started training football with the youth academy of Radnički Obrenovac, and continued them with the youth categories of Red Star Belgrade for four years. He spent several months on loan at FK IMT in 2021, and then moved to FK TSC. During the summer of 2022, they planned that he would go on loan to Loznica. Due to the injury of Nikola Bursać, Ilić was given the opportunity at the beginning of the 2022–23 season. He established himself in front of his team's goal, and at the beginning of 2023, he extended his contract with TSC.

On 2 September 2025, Ilić signed for Ekstraklasa club Widzew Łódź on a four-year deal, with a one-year option, for an undisclosed fee.

== International career ==
Ilić received an invitation to the Serbia U19s for the "Stevan Vilotić Ćele" Memorial Tournament in 2021. He made his debut against his peers from Montenegro, replacing Marko Ćopić in front of the goal after one hour of play. The head coach of the Serbia U21s, Goran Stevanović, sent Ilić an invitation for a friendly match with Bulgaria in September 2022.

He earned his first cap for the Serbia national team on 4 June 2026, playing the last 30 minutes of a 5–1 friendly loss to Mexico.
