= Nemanja Vučić =

Serbian footballer

Personal information
- Date of birth: 11 June 1996 (age 30)
- Place of birth: Kosovska Mitrovica, FR Yugoslavia
- Height: 1.80 m (5 ft 11 in)
- Position: Left-back

Team information
- Current team: Trepča

Youth career
- 2010–2012: Trepča
- 2012–2014: Sloboda Čačak
- 2014: Borac Čačak
- 2015: Novi Pazar

Senior career*
Years	Team	Apps	(Gls)
2012–2014	Sloboda Čačak	17	(2)
2015	FAP	11	(3)
2016–2019	Zemun	72	(13)
2019–2020	Vojvodina	2	(0)
2020–2022	Voždovac	5	(1)
2023	Trepča		
2023–2024	Polet Ljubić		
2024-	Trepča		

International career^{‡}
2017	Serbia U20	2	(0)
2017–2019	Serbia U21	3	(0)
- * Club domestic league appearances and goals as of 15 March 2021 ‡ National team caps and goals as of 2 March 2018

Nemanja Vučić (Serbian Cyrillic: Немања Вучић; born 11 June 1996) is a Serbian footballer who plays as a left back for Trepča.

== Club career ==
=== Early years ===
Born in Kosovska Mitrovica, Vučić moved to Čačak, where he made his first senior appearances with the local club Sloboda in the Serbian League West. While with the club, he made 17 appearances and scored 2 goals between 2012 and 2014. In summer 2014, Vučić moved to Borac Čačak, where he usually played as a member of youth team for the rest of calendar year, after which he moved to Novi Pazar for the spring half of the 2014–15 campaign. As he failed to make any appearance in top tier of the Serbian football pyramid, Vučić left the club after overgrown youth selection and moved to FAP in summer 2015. During the first half of the 2015–16 campaign in the Serbian League West, Vučić collected 11 caps and scored 3 goals for team as a bonus player, being elected for a player of the match once time, in a match against Šumadija 1903. In the mid-season, Vučić decided to leave the club.

=== Zemun ===
At the beginning of 2016, Vučić joined the Serbian First League side Zemun. He made his debut for the club in 2-0 away defeat against OFK Bačka on 12 March 2016. Later, until the end of season, Vučić collected 8 matches at total, earning double yellow card in 25th fixture match against Proleter Novi Sad. At the beginning of 2015–16 Serbian First League campaign, Vučić was usually used as a back-up choice under coach Dragoljub Bekvalac. He made a single appearance in 0–0 draw to Sloboda Užice in the 3rd fixture, replacing Srđan Ajković in 77th minute of the match. Vučić returned to the field in 9th fixture match against BSK Borča, playing the whole matches for the rest of season under coach Milan Milanović. Vučić also scored 4 goals during the second half-season in matches against Radnički Pirot, OFK Odžaci, Budućnost Dobanovci, and Jagodina, contributing to the club's promotion in the Serbian SuperLiga. Vučić made his SuperLiga in opening match of the 2017–18 campaign against Mladost Lučani on 22 July 2017. For the rest of 2017, Vučić noted 18 league and 1 cup appearance scoring 3 goals, against Radnički Niš, Mačva Šabac, and Rad. On 25 February 2018, Vučić had been elected for a player of the match in 1–1 draw to Partizan, realising a penalty kick, which previously extorted in a duel with Luka Cucin. Vučić suffered an injury later in 2018, after which he missed the rest of season.

== International career ==
Vučić was called-up in the Serbia u20 team in 2017, under coach Milan Obradović. In June 2017, he made two appearances for the team, for games against Israel and Greece u20, replacing Jovica Blagojević in both of matches. Vučić got his first call-in Serbian u 21 team by coach Goran Đorović in September 2017, after which he was usually used as a back-up choice for Miroslav Bogosavac in the 2019 UEFA European Under-21 Championship qualification. He made his debut for under-21 level selection in away friendly against Qatar U23 on 17 December 2017, scoring own goal on the match.

== Style of play ==
Standing at 5-foot-11-inches (1.80 m), Vučić is a left-footed footballer who usually operates as a left-back. While in youth categories, he also appeared as a centre-back or defensive midfielder in some occasions, improving sliding tackles and defensive skills. Turning fully professional and coming to the top level of Serbian football, Vučić has been described as a player with more pronounced offensive characteristics, who often breaks through the opponent's middle, but with a slightly worse attitude in defense. Vučić is also an accurate penalty taker. Scoring penalty kicks for Zemun in two successive home victories over Mačva Šabac and Rad in November 2017, Vučić is labelled as a player with strong leadership and influence in the team. Vučić also beat Vladimir Stojković using Panenka style in 1–1 away draw against Partizan.

== Career statistics ==
As of 24 August 2019

Appearances and goals by club, season and competition
Club	Season	League			Cup		Continental		Other		Total	
Club	Season	Division	Apps	Goals	Apps	Goals	Apps	Goals	Apps	Goals	Apps	Goals
Sloboda Čačak	2012–13	Serbian League West	8	1	—		—		—		8	1
Sloboda Čačak	2013–14	Serbian League West	9	1	—		—		—		9	1
Sloboda Čačak	Total		17	2	—		—		—		17	2
FAP	2015–16	Serbian League West	11	3	—		—		—		11	3
Zemun	2015–16	Serbian First League	8	0	—		—		—		8	0
Zemun	2016–17	Serbian First League	23	4	0	0	—		—		23	4
Zemun	2017–18	Serbian SuperLiga	23	6	1	0	—		—		24	6
Zemun	2018–19	Serbian SuperLiga	18	3	0	0	—		—		18	3
Zemun	Total		72	13	1	0	—		—		73	13
Vojvodina	2019–20	Serbian SuperLiga	1	0	0	0	—		—		1	0
Career total			101	18	1	0	—		—		102	18
