= Nemanja Jorgić =

Serbian footballer

Personal information
- Full name: Nemanja Jorgić
- Date of birth: 7 April 1988 (age 38)
- Place of birth: Virovitica, SR Croatia, SFR Yugoslavia
- Height: 1.86 m (6 ft 1 in)
- Position: Goalkeeper

Team information
- Current team: TSC
- Number: 23

Youth career
- Vojvodina

Senior career*
Years	Team	Apps	(Gls)
2006–2008	Vojvodina	0	(0)
2006–2008	→ Sloga Temerin (loan)	42	(0)
2008–2010	Palić	54	(0)
2010–2011	Spartak Subotica	0	(0)
2011–2013	Sloga Temerin	59	(0)
2014	Radnički Sombor	14	(0)
2014	Cement Beočin	15	(0)
2015–	TSC Bačka Topola (Note: TSC appearances don't cover second half of the 2014–15 season.)	42	(0)

International career
2004–2005	Serbia and Montenegro U17 (Note: Only official UEFA matches included.)	3	(0)
- * Club domestic league appearances and goals as of 6 January 2025

Nemanja Jorgić (Serbian Cyrillic: Немања Јоргић; born 7 April 1988) is a Serbian professional footballer who plays as a goalkeeper for TSC Bačka Topola.

== Club career ==
After progressing through the youth setup of Vojvodina, Jorgić was loaned out to Serbian League Vojvodina club Sloga Temerin. He later played for Spartak Subotica, making one appearance in the 2010–11 UEFA Europa League.

In early 2015, Jorgić moved to Bačka Zone League side TSC. He helped the club win promotion to the Serbian League Vojvodina in 2015, then to the Serbian First League in 2017, and eventually to the Serbian SuperLiga in 2019.

== International career ==
Jorgić was capped for Serbia and Montenegro U17.

== Honours ==
TSC

- Serbian First League: 2018–19
