= Andrej Todoroski =

Macedonian footballer (born 1999)

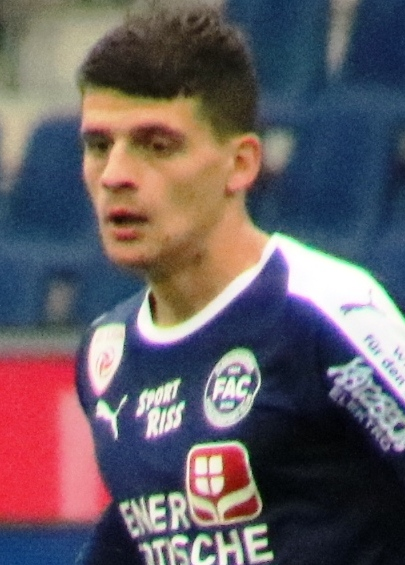
- Todoroski with Floridsdorfer AC in 2018

Personal information
- Date of birth: 19 April 1999 (age 27)
- Place of birth: Prilep, Macedonia
- Height: 1.74 m (5 ft 9 in)
- Position: Forward

Team information
- Current team: TSC
- Number: 10

Youth career
- –2010: Pobeda
- 2010–2015: Rapid Wien
- 2015–2017: First Vienna FC

Senior career*
Years	Team	Apps	(Gls)
2017–2018	First Vienna FC	17	(3)
2018–2020	Floridsdorfer AC	29	(3)
2020–2021	Wiener Sport-Club	8	(4)
2021–2025	Spartak Subotica	109	(22)
2025–	TSC	43	(11)

International career^{‡}
2018	Macedonia U21	1	(0)
- * Club domestic league appearances and goals as of 13 June 2026 ‡ National team caps and goals as of 19 November 2018

Andrej Todoroski (born 19 April 1999) is a Macedonian professional footballer who plays as a forward for Serbian SuperLiga club TSC.

== Club career ==
=== Early career ===
Todoroski played at a young age for his hometown club Pobeda. His first stop in Austria was in the youth department of Rapid Wien, where he joined in the summer of 2010 at the age of 11, and later also played in their academy. In 2015, he moved to First Vienna FC. In April 2016, he played for the fifth-tier second team of Vienna for the first time against Landstraßer AC.

In May 2017, he made his debut for the first team of the club in the Austrian Regionalliga when he came on in the 88th minute for Daniel Maurer on matchday 27 of the 2016–17 season against SC Neusiedl am See.

He scored his first two goals in the Austrian Regionalliga in October 2017 during a 3–1 win over FC Stadlau. After the forced relegation to the fifth-tier Austrian 2. Landesliga during the winter break of the 2017–18 season, Todoroski scored 23 goals in 15 matches there.

=== Floridsdorfer AC ===
For the 2018–19 season, he moved to second-division team Floridsdorfer AC. He made his debut in July 2018, when he started in the first match of the season against SKU Amstetten and was substituted in the 55th minute by Denis Bosnjak.

=== Wiener Sport-Club ===
After two seasons with FAC, he transferred to the Austrian Regionalliga club Wiener Sport-Club for the 2020–21 season. He made eight appearances for WSC until the COVID-19-related suspension of the season, scoring four times.

=== Spartak Subotica ===
For the 2021–22 season, Todoroski moved to Serbia to join the top-tier club Spartak Subotica.

== International career ==
In November 2018, Todoroski becomes part of Macedonia U21 with which he made his debut in a 2–0 away win against Montenegro U21 after coming on as a substitute in the 78th minute in place of Milosh Tosheski.
