= Luka Cucin =

Serbian association footballer

Personal information
- Date of birth: 24 November 1998 (age 27)
- Place of birth: Belgrade, FR Yugoslavia
- Height: 1.80 m (5 ft 11 in)
- Position: Right back

Team information
- Current team: Loznica
- Number: 13

Youth career
- Srem Jakovo
- Partizan

Senior career*
Years	Team	Apps	(Gls)
2016–2021	Partizan	4	(0)
2016–2017	→ Teleoptik (loan)	39	(0)
2019	→ Spartak Subotica (loan)	7	(0)
2020–2021	→ Inđija (loan)	41	(0)
2021	Vojvodina	5	(0)
2022	Borac Banja Luka	5	(0)
2022–2023	Laçi	13	(0)
2023	Novi Sad	11	(1)
2023	Kolubara	16	(0)
2024	Radnik Bijeljina	8	(0)
2024–	Loznica	12	(0)

International career
2014	Serbia U16	3	(0)
2015	Serbia U17	3	(0)
2015–2016	Serbia U18	7	(0)
2017	Serbia U19	1	(0)
- * Club domestic league appearances and goals as of 4 May 2024

Luka Cucin (Serbian Cyrillic: Лука Цуцин, pronounced [lûːka tsǔtsin]; born 24 November 1998) is a Serbian professional footballer who plays as a defender for Serbian First League club Loznica.

== Career ==
After initially training karate, Cucin started playing football at Srem Jakovo. He later joined the youth system of Partizan. In the summer of 2016, Cucin was loaned to affiliated side Teleoptik. He helped them win the Serbian League Belgrade in the 2016–17 season, as the club earned promotion to the Serbian First League. In early 2018, Cucin was recalled from his loan at Teleoptik and returned to Partizan.

On 23 June 2021, Cucin signed a three-year deal for a Serbian SuperLiga club Vojvodina.

== Honours ==
Teleoptik

- Serbian League Belgrade: 2016–17

Partizan

- Serbian Cup: 2017–18
