= Miloš Pantović (footballer, born 2002) =

Serbian footballer

Personal information
- Date of birth: 24 August 2002 (age 24)
- Place of birth: Novi Sad, FR Yugoslavia
- Height: 1.81 m (5 ft 11 in)
- Position: Forward

Team information
- Current team: FK Železničar (on loan from Panathinaikos)
- Number: 27

Youth career
- Vojvodina
- 2017–2020: Red Star Belgrade

Senior career*
Years	Team	Apps	(Gls)
2019–2021	Red Star Belgrade	0	(0)
2020	→ Grafičar Beograd (loan)	6	(1)
2020	→ Voždovac (loan)	16	(3)
2021–2023	Voždovac	67	(12)
2023–2025	TSC	74	(21)
2025–	Panathinaikos	20	(1)
2026–	→ FK Železničar (loan)	6	(3)

International career^{‡}
2021–2024	Serbia U21	11	(2)
2023	Serbia	1	(0)
- * Club domestic league appearances and goals as of 22 November 2026 ‡ National team caps and goals as of 22 November 2026

Miloš Pantović (Serbian Cyrillic: Милош Пантовић; born 24 August 2002) is a Serbian professional footballer who plays as a forward for Serbian SuperLiga side FK Železničar Pančevo, on loan from Super League Greece club Panathinaikos.

== Club career ==
On 31 August 2025, Pantović moved abroad for the first time, joining Greek club Panathinaikos from TSC in a deal worth €1.5 million.

== International career ==
Pantović made his debut for the Serbia national football team on 25 January 2023 in a friendly match against the United States. Serbia won the game 2–1, with Pantović coming on in the second half as a substitute.

== Career statistics ==
=== Club ===
As of match played 17 May 2026

Appearances and goals by club, season and competition
Club	Season	League			National cup (Note: Includes Serbian Cup, Greek Cup)		Europe		Total	
Club	Season	Division	Apps	Goals	Apps	Goals	Apps	Goals	Apps	Goals
Red Star Belgrade	2019–20	Serbian SuperLiga	0	0	1	0	0	0	1	0
Grafičar Beograd (loan)	2019–20	Serbian SuperLiga	6	1	—		—		6	1
Voždovac (loan)	2020–21	Serbian SuperLiga	16	3	1	0	—		17	3
Voždovac	2021–22	Serbian SuperLiga	36	5	1	1	—		37	6
Voždovac	2022–23	Serbian SuperLiga	31	7	1	0	—		32	7
Voždovac	Total		67	12	2	1	—		69	13
TSC	2023–24	Serbian SuperLiga	37	11	0	0	6 (Note: Two appearances in UEFA Champions League, four appearances and one goal in UEFA Europa League)	1	43	12
TSC	2024–25	Serbian SuperLiga	34	10	3	1	10 (Note: Two appearances in UEFA Europa League, eight appearances and five goals in UEFA Conference League)	5	47	16
TSC	2025–26	Serbian SuperLiga	3	0	—		—		3	0
TSC	Total		74	21	3	1	16	6	93	28
Panathinaikos	2025–26	Super League Greece	20	1	5	1	8 (Note: Appearances in UEFA Europa League)	0	33	2
Career total			183	38	12	3	24	6	219	47

=== International ===
As of 25 January 2023

Appearances and goals by national team and year
National team	Year	Apps	Goals
Serbia
Serbia	2023	1	0
Total		1	0
