= FK TSC =

Serbian association football club

TSC
- Full name: Fudbalski klub TSC
- Founded: 10 February 1913; 113 years ago as Topolyai Sport Club refounded in 2005 as FK Bačka Topola
- Ground: TSC Arena
- Capacity: 4,500
- Owner: MOL
- Chairman: János Zsemberi
- Head coach: Nenad Milijaš
- League: Serbian First League
- 2025–26: Serbian SuperLiga, 13th of 16 (relegated)
- Website: fktsc.com
| Home colours | Away colours | Third colours |

FK TSC (Serbian Cyrillic: ФК ТСЦ), commonly known as TSC, is a Serbian professional football club based in Bačka Topola. Its initial founding date in 1913 as Topolyai Sport Club makes it currently the second-oldest football club in the Serbian First League, although the club dissolved in 2003 and was reformed under its current incarnation in 2005.

== History ==
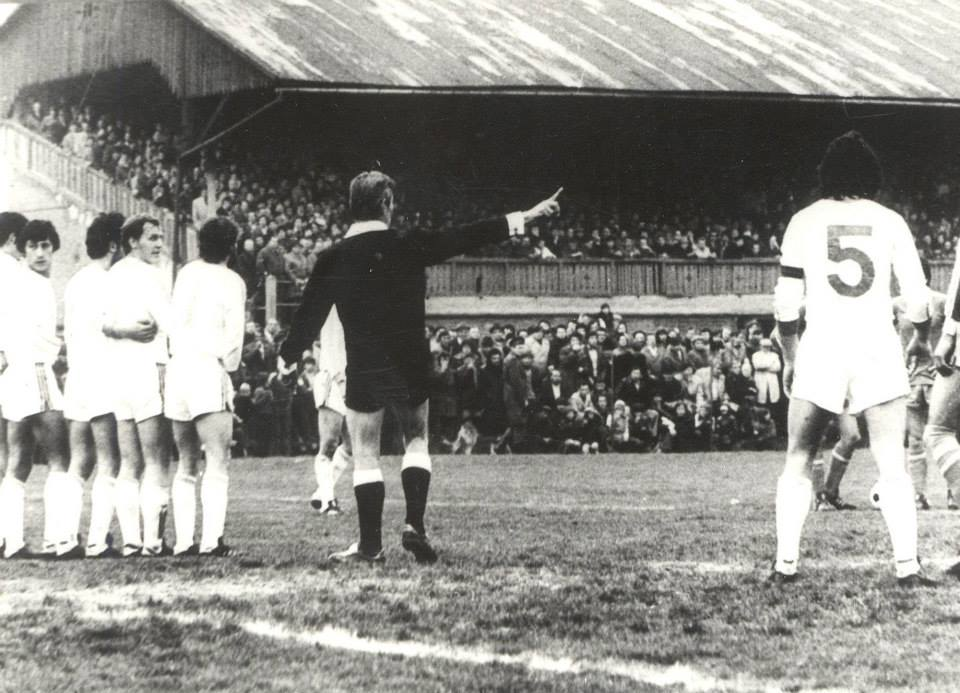
Derby day in Subotica against Spartak in Yugoslav third league in 1978

The first football club in Bačka Topola formed in 1912, but TSC officially exists since 1913, and was founded by István Benis, who was the first president. Back then, the club was named Topolyai Sport Club. The town was part of Kingdom of Hungary, and the Austro-Hungarian Empire, and the first club sponsor was Károly Beer, who also brought the first football to the town. Soon the First World War started and after the war the region of Bačka would become part of the Kingdom of Serbs, Croats and Slovenes, renamed into Yugoslavia in 1929. In 1930, the club changed its name into Jugoslovenski Atletski Klub. In the early 1930s, the stadium where the club still plays nowadays was built. In the Second World War the club competed in the Hungarian Second League, finishing in second place in 1942.

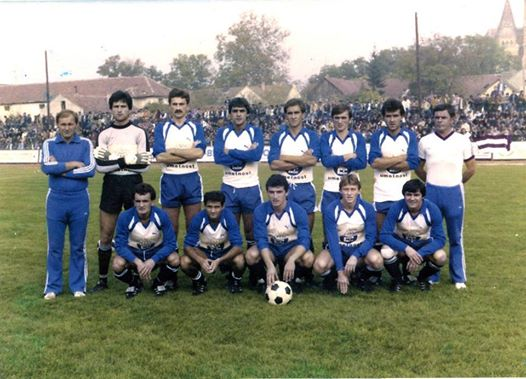
AIK Bačka Topola in 1986

After the war the region returned to Yugoslavia, and the club was renamed Egység, and counted with Hungarian international Jenő Kalmár among its strongest reinforcements. In 1951, the club changes its name again into Topola. The club played in the Subotica regional league and later achieved promotion to the Serbian League (3rd Yugoslav tier).

In 1974, the club changed its name to FK AIK Bačka Topola. In 1980, AIK was promoted to the Yugoslav Second League, and over the next 6 years competed 5 seasons in the second highest division. In the Yugoslavian Cup competition of the season 1992–93 they entered the 1/8 finals after a win against the First League club Napredak Kruševac 2–1.

In 2003, the club under financial difficulties ceased to compete, and maintained only the youth levels. In 2005, the club merged with FK Bajša and started competing again under a new name, FK Bačka Topola. The club was the champion of the Vojvodina League North in the 2006–07 season. The club has dedicated much effort in the youth squads archiving titles in several levels. The club finished the 2010–11 season in second place, and won the relegation game for the Third League. In 2013, the official name was changed to FK TSC. On 15 October 2013, the club's anniversary, TSC played against FK Partizan (1–4). The club finished the season 2013–14 in second place, and lost the promotion play-off game for the Third League after a penalty shootout (2–2, 2–2) against FK Cement Beočin. In 2014–2015, TSC won the Bačka League, and returned to the Serbian League Vojvodina, national third tier.

The club finished the 2016–17 Serbian League Vojvodina in third place, but got promoted to the Serbian First League. From the Serbian second tier, they were for the first time ever promoted to the Serbian SuperLiga for the 2019–20 season. There in their first ever top flight match away to FK Voždovac in Belgrade, playing at the modern shopping centre stadium, TSC won 1–2, marking a fine debut and the brightest moment in the club's history. Under manager Zoltan Sabo, the club finished 4th in their first season in the SuperLiga and qualified for the Europa League first qualifying round. Throughout the club's debut season strikers Nenad Lukić and Vladimir Silađi were impressive, finishing the season as triple joint top scorers. Other impressive players in the season for TSC were Janko Tumbasević, Goran Antonić, Saša Tomanović, Srđan Grabež and Đuro Zec.

In the 2022–23 season, the club finished second in the league to qualify to the Champions League third qualifying round for the first time in their history. TSC lost 7–1 on aggregate to S.C. Braga, but were nonetheless assured a spot in the Europa League group stage.

== Name changes ==
- 1913–1930: Topolyai Sport Club
- 1930–1942: JAK Bačka Topola
- 1942–1945: Topolyai SE
- 1945–1951: FK Egység
- 1951–1974: FK Topola
- 1974–2003: FK AIK Bačka Topola
- 2005–2013: FK Bačka Topola
- 2013–present: FK TSC

== Club colours and crest ==
The club's original colours were green and white, but later replaced by blue. The lion on the crest is the coat of arms of Bačka Topola, which comes from the coat of arms of Pál Kray who was a nobleman in the town in 18th century.

== Stadium ==
The home ground of TSC was the City Stadium, which held 4,000 people. Construction of the stadium was finished in the 1930s. In 2017, TSC announced its intentions to build a new 4,500-seat stadium. From the 2018–19 to the 2021–22 season, because of the construction of the new stadium, the club's home games were played in City Stadium in Senta. On 3 September 2021 the TSC Arena was opened by the match against Ferencváros.

== Supporters ==
The official supporters group of the club are the Blue Betyárs.

The club is supported by the local ethnic Hungarians and receives considerable support from both Hungary and its diaspora elsewhere.

== Funding ==
The club's owner and main sponsor is the Hungarian multinational oil and gas public company MOL.

Janos Zsemberi became the club's main investor in 2013 which changed the club's fortunes. Viktor Orbán has also taken an interest in supporting the club financially.

== Honours ==
- Serbian SuperLiga
  - Runners-up (1): 2022–23
- Serbian First League
  - Champions (1): 2018–19
- Serbian League Vojvodina
  - Runners-up (1): 2015–16
- Vojvodina League
  - Winners (2): 1979–80, 1984–85
  - Runners-up (3): 1977–78, 1986–87, 1987–88

== Players ==
=== Current squad ===
As of 3 September 2026

Note: Flags indicate national team as defined under FIFA eligibility rules; some limited exceptions apply. Players may hold more than one non-FIFA nationality.

| No. | Pos. | Nation | Player |
|---|---|---|---|
| 1 | GK | SRB | Nikola Simić |
| 3 | DF | BIH | Miloš Šatara |
| 4 | DF | SRB | Vukašin Krstić |
| 7 | MF | SRB | Milan Radin |
| 8 | FW | SRB | Saša Jovanović (captain) |
| 9 | FW | SRB | Bogdan Petrović |
| 10 | FW | MKD | Andrej Todoroski |
| 11 | MF | SRB | Mihajlo Nešković |
| 12 | FW | SRB | Nemanja Nikolić |
| 14 | FW | SRB | Vahid Gicić |
| 15 | MF | SRB | Stefan Mladenović |
| 16 | MF | SRB | Aleksandar Stančić |
| 17 | MF | SRB | Mihajlo Milosavić |

| No. | Pos. | Nation | Player |
|---|---|---|---|
| 22 | DF | SRB | Stefan Jovanović |
| 23 | GK | SRB | Nemanja Jorgić |
| 24 | DF | SRB | Andreja Stojanović |
| 27 | DF | SRB | Andrija Milašinović |
| 29 | FW | CGO | Prestige Mboungou |
| 30 | DF | SRB | Aranđel Stojković |
| 33 | DF | SRB | Dragan Tegeltija |
| 42 | MF | SRB | Stefan Tomović |
| 55 | MF | SRB | Miloš Soprenić |
| 73 | GK | SRB | Nikola Bursać |
| 80 | MF | SRB | Andrej Petrović |
| 99 | GK | SRB | Andrija Milićević |

=== Out on loan ===
Note: Flags indicate national team as defined under FIFA eligibility rules; some limited exceptions apply. Players may hold more than one non-FIFA nationality.

| No. | Pos. | Nation | Player |
|---|---|---|---|
| — | DF | SRB | Vuk Bogdanović (at Napredak Kruševac until the end of the 2026–27 season) |
| — | DF | FRA | Baptiste Roux (at Universitatea Craiova until the end of the 2026–27 season) |

| No. | Pos. | Nation | Player |
|---|---|---|---|
| — | DF | SRB | Nemanja Pivnički (at Hajduk Divoš until the end of the 2026–27 season) |

== European record ==
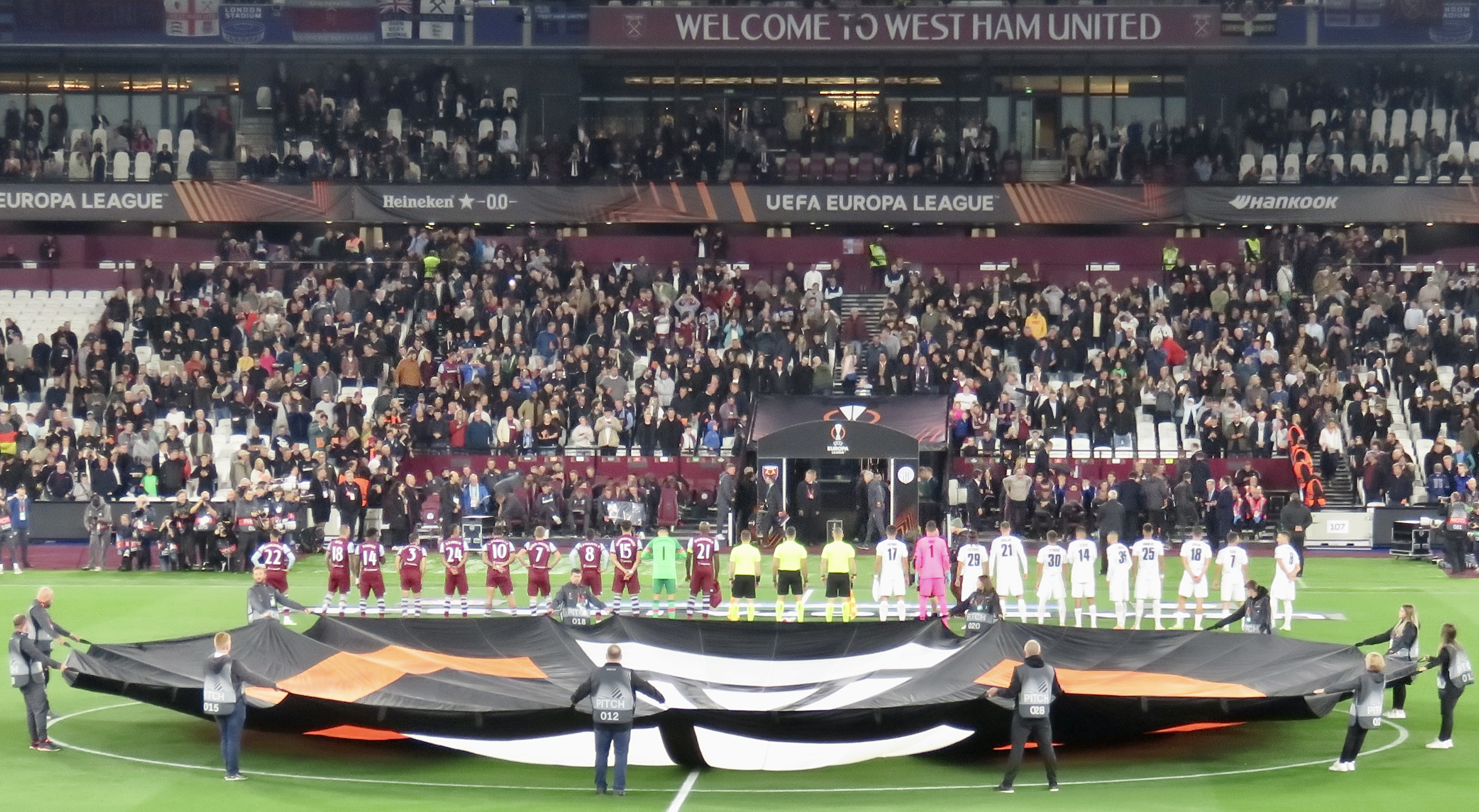
The players of West Ham United and TSC line up before their Europa League match at the London Stadium

| Season | Competition | Round | Opponent | Home | Away | Aggregate |
|---|---|---|---|---|---|---|
| 2020–21 | UEFA Europa League | First qualifying round | (Moldova) Petrocub Hîncești | —N/a | 2–0 | 2–0 |
| 2020–21 | UEFA Europa League | Second qualifying round | (Romania) FCSB | 6–6 (a.e.t.) | —N/a | 6–6 (4–5 p) |
| 2023–24 | UEFA Champions League | Third qualifying round | (Portugal) Braga | 1–4 | 0–3 | 1–7 |
| 2023–24 | UEFA Europa League | Group A | (England) West Ham United | 0–1 | 1–3 | 4th of 4 |
| 2023–24 | UEFA Europa League | Group A | (Greece) Olympiacos | 2–2 | 2–5 | 4th of 4 |
| 2023–24 | UEFA Europa League | Group A | (Germany) SC Freiburg | 1–3 | 0–5 | 4th of 4 |
| 2024–25 | UEFA Europa League | Play-off round | (Israel) Maccabi Tel Aviv | 1–5 | 0–3 | 1–8 |
| 2024–25 | UEFA Conference League | League Phase | (Kazakhstan) Astana | —N/a | 0–1 | 24th of 36 |
| 2024–25 | UEFA Conference League | League Phase | (Poland) Legia Warsaw | 0–3 | —N/a | 24th of 36 |
| 2024–25 | UEFA Conference League | League Phase | (Switzerland) Lugano | 4–1 | —N/a | 24th of 36 |
| 2024–25 | UEFA Conference League | League Phase | (Switzerland) St. Gallen | —N/a | 2–2 | 24th of 36 |
| 2024–25 | UEFA Conference League | League Phase | (Belgium) Gent | —N/a | 0–3 | 24th of 36 |
| 2024–25 | UEFA Conference League | League Phase | (Armenia) Noah | 4–3 | —N/a | 24th of 36 |
| 2024–25 | UEFA Conference League | Knockout phase play-offs | (Poland) Jagiellonia Białystok | 1–3 | 1–3 | 2–6 |

== Club officials ==
Current technical staff
| Position | Name |
| President | (Serbia) János Zsemberi |
| General manager | (Serbia) Szabolcs Palágyi |
| Head coach | (Serbia) Nenad Milijaš |
| Assistant coach | (Serbia) Nemanja Miljanović (Serbia) Miloš Janković |
| Assistant coach/Analyst | (Serbia) Nemanja Golubović (Croatia) Krsto Jokić |
| Conditioning coach | (Serbia) Bogdan Belegišanin (Hungary) Kornél Bubori |
| Goalkeeper coach | (Serbia) Szilárd Faragó |
| First team secretary | (Serbia) Vojislav Stantić |
| Physiotherapist | (Serbia) Dragan Golubović (Serbia) Dominik Paróci |
| Secretary general | (Serbia) Borislav Banjac |
| Doctor | (Serbia) Dr. Tibor Deák |
| First team kit manager | (Hungary) Attila Dévity |
| Secretary | (Serbia) Radomir Šaban |
| Security commissioner | (Serbia) Zlatko Zsemberi |
Source: FK TSC

== Notable players ==
The following players played for national teams:

- (Australia) Miloš Degenek
- (Bosnia and Herzegovina) Ifet Đakovac
- (Cameroon) Macky Bagnack
- (Montenegro) Savo Pavićević
- (Montenegro) Marko Rakonjac
- (Montenegro) Janko Tumbasević
- (New Zealand) Sarpreet Singh
- (North Macedonia) Bojan Dimoski
- (North Macedonia) Martin Mirčevski
- (Hungary) Jenő Kalmár
- (Hungary) Norbert Könyves
- (Suriname) Tyrone Conraad
- (Serbia) Aleksandar Davidov
- (Serbia) Luka Ilić
- (Serbia) Veljko Ilić
- (Serbia) Branko Jovičić
- (Serbia) Nenad Lukić
- (Serbia) Miloš Pantović
- (Serbia) Marko Petković
- (Serbia) Nemanja Petrović
- (Serbia) Slobodan Rajković
- (Serbia) Petar Ratkov
- (Serbia) Petar Škuletić
- (Serbia) Petar Stanić
- (Serbia) Nikola Žigić
- (Serbia and Montenegro) Radovan Krivokapić
- (Socialist Federal Republic of Yugoslavia) Slobodan Batričević
- (Socialist Federal Republic of Yugoslavia) Nikica Klinčarski
- (Socialist Federal Republic of Yugoslavia) Zlatko Krmpotić

For the list of current and former players with Wikipedia article, please see: Category:FK TSC players.
