= List of Serbian football transfers summer 2015 =

This is a list of transfers in Serbian football for the 2015 summer transfer window. Only moves featuring a Serbian SuperLiga side are listed. The order by which the clubs are listed is equal to the classification at the end of 2014–15 Serbian SuperLiga.

== Serbian SuperLiga ==
=== Partizan ===
In: Note: Flags indicate national team as defined under FIFA eligibility rules; some limited exceptions apply. Players may hold more than one non-FIFA nationality.

No.	Pos.	Nation	Player
21	MF	SRB	Marko Jevtović (from Novi Pazar)
92	MF	SRB	Nikola Trujić (from Napredak Kruševac)
86	FW	BUL	Valeri Bojinov (from (Italy) Ternana Calcio)
44	DF	BRA	Fabrício (on loan from (Brazil) Bragantino)
18	MF	SRB	Nemanja Glavčić (loan return from Teleoptik)
15	FW	CMR	Aboubakar Oumarou (from (Belgium) Waasland-Beveren)
80	FW	SRB	Marko Golubović (from Teleoptik)
27	MF	MNE	Nebojša Kosović (from (Belgium) Standard Liège)
3	DF	SRB	Nikola Leković (on loan from (Poland) Lechia Gdańsk)
19	DF	BIH	Aleksandar Subić (from (Bosnia and Herzegovina) Borac Banja Luka)
91	MF	SRB	Alen Stevanović (from (Italy) Torino)

Out: Note: Flags indicate national team as defined under FIFA eligibility rules; some limited exceptions apply. Players may hold more than one non-FIFA nationality.

No.	Pos.	Nation	Player
55	MF	SRB	Danilo Pantić (to (England) Chelsea)
3	DF	MNE	Vladimir Volkov (to (Belgium) Mechelen)
21	MF	SRB	Saša Marković (to (Spain) Córdoba)
18	MF	MNE	Nikola Drinčić (to (Israel) Maccabi Haifa)
—	MF	BRA	Eliomar (on loan to Javor Ivanjica, was on loan at (Greece) AEL)
—	DF	MKD	Stefan Aškovski (on loan to Novi Pazar, was on loan at (North Macedonia) Shkëndija)
30	DF	SLO	Branko Ilić (to (Kazakhstan) Astana)
—	FW	SRB	Stefan Lukić (on loan to Bežanija)
25	GK	SRB	Milan Lukač (to (Turkey) Akhisar)
—	MF	SRB	Filip Knežević (on loan to Borac Čačak, was on loan at (Portugal) Vitória Guimarães)
9	FW	SRB	Nemanja Kojić (to (Turkey) Gaziantep B.B.)
—	DF	SRB	Miloš Perišić (on loan to Sinđelić Beograd, previously brought from Teleoptik)
—	FW	SRB	Lazar Sajčić (on loan to Sinđelić Beograd, previously brought from Teleoptik)
—	DF	SRB	Stefan Savić (to Sloga PM)
—	MF	SRB	Uroš Damnjanović (on loan to Sinđelić Beograd, previously brought from Teleoptik)
—	MF	MNE	Jovan Čađenović (on loan to Teleoptik, previously brought from same club)
—	DF	SRB	Stefan Grbović (on loan to Teleoptik, previously brought from same club)
26	GK	SRB	Jovan Trnić (on loan to Teleoptik, previously brought from same club)
—	DF	SRB	Adnan Islamović (on loan to Teleoptik)
—	MF	SRB	Tomislav Todorović (on loan to Teleoptik)
—	DF	SRB	Nemanja Mladenović (to Železničar Lajkovac)
—	GK	SRB	Vukašin Pilipović (to Vojvodina youth)
—	GK	SRB	Stefan Vasić (released, was on loan at Mačva Šabac)
—	FW	SRB	Marko Platiša (to Red Star Belgrade)
—	DF	SRB	Emir Azemović (to (Portugal) Benfica youth)
29	FW	SRB	Nenad Marinković (on loan to Voždovac)
35	DF	SRB	Miladin Stevanović (loan extension to Teleoptik)
23	DF	SRB	Miroslav Bogosavac (loan extension to Teleoptik)

=== Red Star Belgrade ===
In: Note: Flags indicate national team as defined under FIFA eligibility rules; some limited exceptions apply. Players may hold more than one non-FIFA nationality.

No.	Pos.	Nation	Player
94	MF	MNE	Vladimir Jovović (from (Montenegro) Sutjeska Nikšić)
18	MF	SRB	Nemanja Ahčin (loan return from Mladost Lučani)
77	DF	SRB	Zoran Rendulić (from Čukarički)
10	MF	SRB	Aleksandar Katai (was on loan, now signed from (Greece) Olympiacos)
11	MF	ISR	Idan Vered (from (Israel) Maccabi Haifa)
15	MF	BRA	Bruno Matos (from Novi Pazar)
70	FW	POR	Hugo Vieira (from (Russia) Torpedo Moscow)
88	DF	ARG	Luis Ibáñez (from (Hungary) Győri ETO)
17	MF	SRB	Srđan Plavšić (from Spartak Subotica)
20	MF	NED	Mitchell Donald (on loan from (Russia) Mordovia)
—	FW	SRB	Aleksandar Bogdanović (from Radnički Niš, to youth squad)
—	FW	SRB	Marko Platiša (from Partizan, to youth squad)
81	FW	SRB	Predrag Sikimić (from Voždovac)
55	MF	SRB	Slavoljub Srnić (from Čukarički)
27	GK	BIH	Nemanja Supić (from Voždovac)

Out: Note: Flags indicate national team as defined under FIFA eligibility rules; some limited exceptions apply. Players may hold more than one non-FIFA nationality.

No.	Pos.	Nation	Player
8	MF	SRB	Darko Lazović (to (Italy) Genoa)
20	MF	SRB	Miloš Bosančić (to (China) Hangzhou Greentown)
18	DF	SRB	Novak Martinović (released)
17	DF	SRB	Stefan Đorđević (to Borac Čačak)
—	FW	NGR	Ifeanyi Onyilo (to (Saudi Arabia) Al-Faisaly FC, was on loan at (Cyprus) Ermis Aradippou)
4	DF	SRB	Darko Lazić (to (Russia) Anzhi)
—	FW	SRB	Đorđe Despotović (on loan to (Kazakhstan) Kairat, was on loan at (Kazakhstan) Zhetysu)
26	DF	SRB	Marko Marinković (on loan to Spartak Subotica, was on loan at Sinđelić Beograd)
45	MF	SRB	Dušan Živković (on loan to Spartak Subotica)
10	MF	MKD	Daniel Avramovski (on loan to OFK Beograd)
25	DF	SRB	Nenad Cvetković (on loan to Radnički Beograd)
36	DF	SRB	Zlatko Iličić (on loan to Sopot, was on loan at Zemun)
34	DF	SRB	Miloš Stojanović (on loan to Bežanija)
—	MF	SRB	Bogdan Rangelov (to (Greece) Olympiacos youth)
22	GK	SRB	Filip Manojlović (on loan to Bežanija, was on loan at Sopot)
—	MF	AUT	Saša Lazić (to Loznica)
28	MF	MNE	Vukan Savićević (to (Slovakia) Slovan Bratislava)
—	GK	SRB	Ognjen Obradović (loan extension to Sopot)
—	DF	SRB	Nemanja Tošić (on loan to IM Rakovica)
—	DF	SRB	Marko Žikić (on loan to Lokomotiva Beograd)
—	DF	SRB	Vladimir Stupić (to Rad)
—	MF	SRB	Željko Arsić (to Brodarac)
—	MF	SRB	Nemanja Ivanović (to Jagodina)
—	FW	MKD	Darko Grozdanoski (on loan to BASK, previously brought from Čukarički)
—	DF	BIH	Džan Selak (released)
23	FW	ANT	Josh Parker (on loan to (Scotland) Aberdeen)
41	GK	SRB	Jovan Vićić (on loan to GSP Polet)
20	MF	SRB	Nikola Stojković (to Metalac GM, was on loan at BSK Borča)
95	GK	SRB	Predrag Rajković (to (Israel) Maccabi Tel Aviv)
55	MF	SRB	Aleksandar Kovačević (to (Poland) Lechia Gdańsk)
—	GK	SRB	Aleksa Dodić (to Jagodina)
5	DF	SRB	Nikola Mijailović (released)

=== Čukarički ===
In: Note: Flags indicate national team as defined under FIFA eligibility rules; some limited exceptions apply. Players may hold more than one non-FIFA nationality.

No.	Pos.	Nation	Player
1	GK	SRB	Nikola Petrić (from Borac Čačak)
8	MF	MNE	Branislav Janković (from (Montenegro) Grbalj)
19	MF	SRB	Saša Jovanović (from Bežanija)
5	DF	SRB	Marko Ranđelović (from (Bulgaria) Lokomotiv Sofia)
95	MF	SRB	Nikola Karaklajić (from Voždovac)
9	FW	BRA	Tiago Galvão (from (Moldova) Sheriff Tiraspol)
14	DF	GHA	Lee Addy (from (Croatia) Dinamo Zagreb)

Out: Note: Flags indicate national team as defined under FIFA eligibility rules; some limited exceptions apply. Players may hold more than one non-FIFA nationality.

No.	Pos.	Nation	Player
1	GK	SRB	Borivoje Ristić (to Radnik Surdulica)
5	DF	NGR	Ugo Ukah (to (Greece) Kalloni)
8	MF	SRB	Ivan Todorović (to Novi Pazar)
77	DF	SRB	Zoran Rendulić (to Red Star Belgrade)
21	MF	SRB	Aleksandar Alempijević (to Mladost Lučani)
—	DF	SRB	Dušan Došljak (to Bežanija)
31	DF	SRB	Rajko Brežančić (to (Netherlands) AZ Alkmaar)
9	FW	SRB	Nikola Stojiljković (to (Portugal) Braga)
32	MF	SRB	Mihailo Miljković (released, was on loan at BASK)
—	MF	SRB	Danilo Kuč (to BASK)
19	MF	BIH	Tigran Goranović (to (Switzerland) Chênois)
15	MF	SRB	Stefan Dimić (loan extension to Sinđelić Beograd)
18	FW	MNE	Nikola Zvrko (loan extension to Sinđelić Beograd)
42	FW	SRB	Miodrag Gemović (on loan to Zemun, was on loan at Sinđelić Beograd)
27	MF	SRB	Đorđe Radovanović (on loan to Zemun, was on loan at Sinđelić Beograd)
33	GK	SRB	Vladan Grbović (to Žarkovo)
35	GK	SRB	Dušan Čubraković (on loan to BASK)
—	FW	SRB	Nemanja Stanković (on loan to Lokomotiva Beograd)
—	FW	MKD	Darko Grozdanoski (to Red Star Belgrade)
14	MF	SRB	Slavoljub Srnić (to Red Star Belgrade)
—	MF	SRB	Nikola Šakić (loan extension to Kolubara)
—	DF	SRB	Aleksa Obradović (to Sloga Kraljevo, was on loan at Sinđelić Beograd)
—	FW	SRB	Lazar Đurović (to (Israel) Maccabi Tel Aviv)
—	MF	SRB	Nenad Cvetković (to Sloboda Užice)
—	FW	SRB	Dimitrije Pantić (to Stepojevac Vaga)
15	FW	BIH	Budimir Šarčević (on loan to BASK)

=== Vojvodina ===
In: Note: Flags indicate national team as defined under FIFA eligibility rules; some limited exceptions apply. Players may hold more than one non-FIFA nationality.

No.	Pos.	Nation	Player
31	FW	SRB	Uroš Stamenić (loan return from Proleter Novi Sad)
10	MF	SRB	Aleksandar Paločević (from OFK Beograd)
7	MF	SRB	Aleksandar Stanisavljević (from Donji Srem)
9	FW	SRB	Miljan Mrdaković (from (Greece) Levadiakos)
22	MF	SRB	Marko Zoćević (from Borac Čačak)
14	DF	SRB	Ivan Lakićević (from Donji Srem)
28	MF	SRB	Novica Maksimović (from Spartak Subotica)
16	MF	SRB	Siniša Babić (from Proleter Novi Sad)
51	FW	SRB	Ognjen Ožegović (from Borac Čačak)
12	GK	SRB	Nikola Perić (from Jagodina)
27	FW	SRB	Milan Pavkov (from ČSK Čelarevo)
19	DF	SRB	Lazar Rosić (from Radnički Niš)
21	MF	SRB	Nikola Kovačević (from Radnički 1923)
20	DF	SRB	Nikola Antić (from Jagodina)
11	MF	MNE	Marko Vukčević (on loan from (Slovenia) Olimpija Ljubljana)
—	GK	SRB	Vukašin Pilipović (from Partizan, to youth squad)

Out: Note: Flags indicate national team as defined under FIFA eligibility rules; some limited exceptions apply. Players may hold more than one non-FIFA nationality.

No.	Pos.	Nation	Player
18	MF	GEO	Davit Kokhia (released)
—	MF	SRB	Milan Spremo (to (Slovenia) Celje, was on loan at Proleter Novi Sad)
10	MF	SRB	Luka Luković (to (Switzerland) Biel-Bienne)
—	FW	SRB	Nikola Mojsilović (to Bačka BP, was on loan at Radnik Surdulica)
32	MF	MNE	Janko Tumbasević (to Spartak Subotica)
28	FW	SRB	Luka Grgić (to Proleter Novi Sad, was on loan at ČSK Čelarevo)
3	DF	SRB	Nenad Kočović (to Proleter Novi Sad, was on loan at ČSK Čelarevo)
16	MF	SRB	Milan Makarić (to Spartak Subotica)
12	GK	SRB	Milan Jovanić (released)
30	GK	SRB	Vanja Milinković-Savić (loan return to (England) Manchester United)
19	DF	SRB	Stefan Nikolić (to Bačka BP)
33	DF	SRB	Srđan Babić (to (Spain) Real Sociedad)
19	FW	MNE	Šaleta Kordić (to (Montenegro) Sutjeska Nikšić, previously brought from BSK Borča)
7	MF	SRB	Ivan Rogač (to OFK Beograd)
—	DF	SRB	Robert Čaki (to (Germany) Wuppertaler SV)
11	MF	SRB	Mijat Gaćinović (to (Germany) Eintracht Frankfurt)
22	FW	SRB	Jovan Stojanović (to Voždovac)
—	GK	SRB	Emil Rockov (on loan to Proleter Novi Sad, was on loan at Sloga Temerin)
14	DF	SRB	Nikola Fimić (to Proleter Novi Sad)
17	MF	SRB	Dragan Karanov (on loan to Proleter Novi Sad)
21	MF	SRB	Aleksandar Desančić (loan extension to Proleter Novi Sad)
—	DF	MNE	Stefan Zogović (loan extension to Bačka Bačka Palanka)
—	MF	SRB	Stefan Petrović (to Proleter Novi Sad)
—	DF	SRB	Srđan Vukaljević (to Proleter Novi Sad)
—	DF	SRB	David Stojisavljević (to Cement)
—	MF	SRB	Novak Vujošević (to Cement)
—	DF	SRB	Ilija Janković (to ČSK Čelarevo)
—	MF	SRB	Nikola Milić (to ČSK Čelarevo)
—	FW	SRB	Boško Papović (to OFK Odžaci)
—	GK	SRB	Luka Tarabić (to Kabel)
20	MF	SRB	Elmir Asani (to Voždovac)
23	DF	SRB	Igor Đurić (to (Turkey) Karşıyaka, was on loan at Rad)
18	MF	SRB	Lazar Zličić (on loan to Proleter Novi Sad)
35	MF	SRB	Slobodan Novaković (to Proleter Novi Sad)
—	FW	SRB	Nikola Furtula (to ČSK Čelarevo)

=== Novi Pazar ===
In: Note: Flags indicate national team as defined under FIFA eligibility rules; some limited exceptions apply. Players may hold more than one non-FIFA nationality.

No.	Pos.	Nation	Player
5	MF	SRB	Miroljub Kostić (loan extension from (Bosnia and Herzegovina) Sarajevo)
7	MF	SRB	Irfan Vusljanin (free, last with Radnički 1923)
86	DF	SRB	Marko Đalović (free, last with (Kazakhstan) Zhetysu)
7	MF	SRB	Irfan Vusljanin (from Radnički 1923)
24	DF	SRB	Petar Pavlović (free, last with (Greece) Aiginiakos)
22	MF	SRB	Dino Šarac (from Donji Srem)
20	MF	MKD	Ivan Nastevski (from (Greece) Agrotikos Asteras)
3	DF	MKD	Stefan Aškovski (on loan from Partizan)
10	MF	SRB	Almedin Zilkić (from Donji Srem)
6	MF	SRB	Ivan Todorović (from Čukarički)
11	DF	SRB	Radoš Protić (on loan from (Bosnia and Herzegovina) Sarajevo)
55	MF	BIH	Amer Osmanagić (from (Bosnia and Herzegovina) Olimpik Sarajevo)
82	FW	SRB	Jovan Damjanović (free, last with (China) Hunan Billows)
4	DF	SRB	Jasmin Trtovac (from (Romania) Gaz Metan)
18	DF	SRB	Mirsad Brunčević (from (Italy) Hellas Verona)
17	MF	NGR	John Okoye Ebuka (free)
16		NGR	Michael Dagogo (free)
44	DF	SRB	Demir Kadrić (loan return from Jošanica)

Out: Note: Flags indicate national team as defined under FIFA eligibility rules; some limited exceptions apply. Players may hold more than one non-FIFA nationality.

No.	Pos.	Nation	Player
31	DF	SRB	Žarko Udovičić (to (Poland) Zagłębie Sosnowiec)
20	MF	SRB	Dejan Rusmir (to Zemun)
30	MF	SRB	Marko Jevtović (to Partizan)
4	DF	BIH	Željko Đokić (released)
13	FW	SRB	Vuk Sotirović (to (Singapore) Hougang United)
9	MF	SRB	Miloš Mijić (to Mladost Lučani)
14	FW	SRB	Admir Kecap (to (Lithuania) Sūduva)
10	FW	BRA	Richard Falcão (released)
6	MF	ECU	José Mina (released)
18	MF	ECU	José Gutiérrez (to (Ecuador) Deportivo Cuenca)
17	MF	BRA	Bruno Matos (to Red Star Belgrade)
2	DF	SRB	Bojan Đorđević (to Radnički Niš)
11	MF	SRB	Filip Arsenijević (to (Greece) A.O. Trikala)
19	FW	BIH	Boško Stupić (to (Montenegro) Mladost Podgorica, previously brought from (North Macedonia) Bregalnica Štip)
14	MF	SRB	Faruk Bihorac (on loan to Jošanica, previously free agent)
—	MF	SRB	Amel Lakota (on loan to Jošanica)
33	DF	SRB	Denis Biševac (loan extension to Jošanica)
—	DF	SRB	Ibiš Renda (loan extension to Jošanica)
—	DF	SRB	Faris Međedović (loan extension to Jošanica)
—	FW	SRB	Elvir Rebronja (loan extension to Jošanica)
22	GK	SRB	Jasmin Koč (on loan to Polimlje)
—	FW	SRB	Anes Hot (loan extension to Tutin)
92	MF	BRA	Adriano Strack (to (Croatia) Segesta, previously brought from (Croatia) Dugopolje)
—	DF	SRB	Dejan Koraksić (to Metalac GM)
4	DF	SRB	Marko Klisura (to Spartak Subotica, previously brought from Bačka Bačka Palanka)

=== Rad ===
In: Note: Flags indicate national team as defined under FIFA eligibility rules; some limited exceptions apply. Players may hold more than one non-FIFA nationality.

No.	Pos.	Nation	Player
6	DF	SRB	Zoran Ljubinković (from Radnički Niš)
44	MF	SRB	Nemanja Vidić (free, last with Radnički 1923)
3	DF	SRB	Marko Bašanović (from IM Rakovica)
19	MF	SRB	Nemanja Arsenijević (from Jagodina)
26	GK	SRB	Uroš Matić (from Kolubara)
11	FW	SRB	Milorad Dabić (from Žarkovo)
30	MF	SRB	Branislav Stanić (from (Slovakia) Zlaté Moravce)
23	MF	SRB	Dušan Kolarević (from Radnički Niš)
20	DF	SRB	Marko Prljević (from Donji Srem)
66	GK	SRB	Miloš Budaković (from (Bosnia and Herzegovina) Mladost V. O.)
—	DF	SRB	Vladimir Stupić (from Red Star Belgrade)

Out: Note: Flags indicate national team as defined under FIFA eligibility rules; some limited exceptions apply. Players may hold more than one non-FIFA nationality.

No.	Pos.	Nation	Player
88	MF	SRB	Strahinja Karišić (to (Spain) Granada B)
23	DF	SRB	Igor Đurić (loan return to Vojvodina)
11	FW	BIH	Petar Jelić (released)
19	MF	BIH	Ognjen Gnjatić (to (Greece) Platanias)
29	DF	SRB	Branislav Milošević (to (Czech Republic) Dukla Prague)
21	MF	SRB	Nikola Raspopović (to (Turkey) Gaziantep B.B.)
37	MF	SRB	Aleksandar Simić (released)
36	MF	SRB	Nikola Srećković (to Voždovac)
30	DF	MNE	Vladimir Rodić (to (Sweden) Malmö FF)
1	GK	SRB	Boris Radunović (to (Italy) Atalanta)
26	GK	SRB	Filip Erić (to (Bosnia and Herzegovina) Drina Zvornik)
69	FW	SRB	Stefan Mihajlović (to (Switzerland) Biel-Bienne)
9	FW	SRB	Ivan Marković (to (Montenegro) Rudar Pljevlja)
16	DF	SRB	Miroljub Pešić (loan extension to Sinđelić Beograd)
—	MF	SRB	Božidar Veškovac (to OFK Beograd)
—	DF	SRB	Nikola Šipčić (was on loan, now signed with Žarkovo)
34	MF	SRB	Filip Bainović (on loan to Žarkovo)
10	MF	SRB	Đorđe Denić (on loan to Žarkovo)
39	DF	SRB	Aleksandar Milanović (on loan to Žarkovo)
—	MF	SRB	Boško Guzina (to Žarkovo)
99	MF	SRB	Miloš Čudić (to Žarkovo)
—	FW	SRB	Borislav Nedović (to (Germany) Stuttgarter Kickers)
7	FW	SRB	Nemanja Mihajlović (to Teleoptik)
—	MF	SRB	Jovica Blagojević (to Voždovac)

=== Mladost Lučani ===
In: Note: Flags indicate national team as defined under FIFA eligibility rules; some limited exceptions apply. Players may hold more than one non-FIFA nationality.

No.	Pos.	Nation	Player
20	MF	SRB	Matija Protić (loan return from Polet Ljubić)
91	GK	MNE	Nemanja Jevrić (from Čukarički youth team)
13	MF	SRB	Nemanja Milovanović (from (Malta) Mosta)
28	MF	SRB	Miloš Lepović (from Jagodina)
31	MF	SRB	Miloš Mijić (from Novi Pazar)
19	DF	SRB	Aleksandar Živanović (from Jagodina)
3	DF	MKD	Tome Kitanovski (from Voždovac)
18	DF	MKD	Aleksandar Lazevski (from (Slovenia) Olimpija Ljubljana)
93	MF	BIH	Miloš Šatara (from (Bosnia and Herzegovina) Kozara Gradiška)
27	FW	BIH	Miloš Bajić (from Napredak Kruševac)
45	FW	SRB	Miloš Džugurdić (from Voždovac)
8	MF	SRB	Aleksandar Alempijević (from Čukarički)
6	MF	SRB	Miloš Stanojević (from Napredak Kruševac)
33	FW	SRB	Aleksandar Đoković (from Napredak Kruševac)
58	FW	CMR	Michel Vaillant (from Napredak Kruševac)

Out: Note: Flags indicate national team as defined under FIFA eligibility rules; some limited exceptions apply. Players may hold more than one non-FIFA nationality.

No.	Pos.	Nation	Player
4	MF	SRB	Miloš Adamović (to (Hungary) Vasas)
13	DF	SRB	Predrag Đorđević (to Radnik Surdulica)
15	DF	SRB	Marko Marković (released)
27	MF	SRB	Nikola Milošević (released)
31	DF	SRB	Ljubo Nenadić (released)
93	DF	SRB	Milan Gašić (to Napredak Kruševac)
28	MF	SRB	Nemanja Ahčin (loan return to Red Star Belgrade)
23	GK	SRB	Nemanja Latinović (to Srbobran)
58	DF	SRB	Vladimir Otašević (to Metalac GM)
—	FW	SRB	Gradimir Grujičić (was on loan, now signed for Šumadija Kragujevac)
45	FW	NGR	Patrick Friday Eze (to (United Arab Emirates) Al-Fujairah SC)
8	FW	UKR	Yevhen Pavlov (to (Hungary) Vasas)
3	DF	SRB	Nikola Došen (to Smederevo 1924)
69	DF	MNE	Igor Zonjić (to Napredak Kruševac)
30	FW	SRB	Dušan Tešić (to Spartak Subotica)
33	MF	SRB	Miloš Crnomarković (to BSK Borča)
4	DF	SRB	Miloš Ristić (loan extension to Železničar Lajkovac)

=== OFK Beograd ===
In: Note: Flags indicate national team as defined under FIFA eligibility rules; some limited exceptions apply. Players may hold more than one non-FIFA nationality.

No.	Pos.	Nation	Player
19	FW	SRB	Željko Dimitrov (from Radnički Pirot)
14	FW	SRB	Marko Simić (from Kolubara)
15	MF	AZE	Branimir Subašić (from (Turkey) Manisaspor)
4	MF	SRB	Ivan Rogač (from Vojvodina)
2	FW	SRB	Filip Rajevac (from (Poland) Siarka Tarnobrzeg)
18	MF	SRB	Aleksandar Pejović (from (France) Trélissac)
90	MF	MKD	Daniel Avramovski (on loan from Red Star Belgrade)
—	MF	SRB	Armin Đerlek (from Pazar Juniors, to youth squad)
24	MF	MKD	Ostoja Stjepanović (from (Poland) Wisła Kraków)
3	DF	SRB	Nikola Ignjatijević (from Radnički Niš)
20	MF	BIH	Dario Damjanović (from (Hong Kong) Pegasus)
66	DF	SRB	Nikola Mikić (from (Turkey) Manisaspor)
25	DF	SRB	Aleksandar Radovanović (from Mačva Šabac)
55	DF	SRB	Srđa Knežević (from (Japan) V-Varen)
—	MF	SRB	Stefan Kovačević (loan return from Sloboda Užice)
—	MF	SRB	Božidar Veškovac (from Rad)

Out: Note: Flags indicate national team as defined under FIFA eligibility rules; some limited exceptions apply. Players may hold more than one non-FIFA nationality.

No.	Pos.	Nation	Player
9	MF	MNE	Marko Janković (loan return to (Greece) Olympiacos)
8	MF	SRB	Aleksandar Paločević (to Vojvodina)
14	FW	SRB	Luka Belić (to (England) West Ham United)
25	GK	SRB	Miloš Ostojić (to (Croatia) Istra 1961)
23	MF	MKD	Darko Micevski (released)
4	MF	SRB	Saša Zdjelar (loan return to (Greece) Olympiacos)
3	DF	SRB	Nemanja Antonov (to (Switzerland) Grasshoppers)
—	DF	SRB	Igor Gajević (was on loan, now signed with Sopot)
16	DF	SRB	Nikola Aksentijević (to (Belgium) Mouscron)
32	MF	SRB	Milan Sekulić (released, was on loan at Dinamo Pančevo)
15	DF	SLO	Emir Dautović (to (Belgium) Mouscron)
20	MF	SRB	Milan Gajić (to (France) Bordeaux)
19	FW	MNE	Dejan Zarubica (to (Montenegro) Sutjeska Nikšić)
21	FW	SRB	Petar Milić (to Bežanija)
10	MF	SRB	Dejan Dražić (to (Spain) Celta Vigo)
—	MF	SRB	Igor Mitić (to Radnički Beograd)
—	MF	SRB	Stefan Mirčetić (to Sloga Erdevik)
—	MF	SRB	Stojan Milovac (to Vršac)
—	FW	SRB	Luka Terzić (on loan to Sloga Požega)
15	DF	SRB	Filip Sredojević (on loan to Smederevo 1924)
—	DF	SRB	Milovan Filipović (on loan to Sloga BB, was on loan at Hajduk Beograd)
8	FW	SRB	Mladen Sarajlin (on loan to Kolubara)
11	MF	SRB	Miloš Antić (to (Cyprus) Paralimni)
—	MF	SRB	Miloš Gajović (was on loan, now signed with Hajduk Beograd)

=== Radnički Niš ===
In: Note: Flags indicate national team as defined under FIFA eligibility rules; some limited exceptions apply. Players may hold more than one non-FIFA nationality.

No.	Pos.	Nation	Player
54	MF	MKD	Petar Krstić (from Sloga Leskovac)
70	MF	SRB	Andreja Apostolović (from Radnički Pirot)
91	DF	SRB	Aleksandar Mršević (loan return from Sinđelić Niš)
30	DF	SRB	Miloš Mijokov (from Radnički Beograd)
26	GK	SRB	Aleksandar Jovanović (from Donji Srem)
55	MF	SRB	Marko Blažić (free, last with (Kazakhstan) Atyrau)
32	MF	SRB	Vladimir Bogdanović (free, last with (Moldova) Veris Chișinău)
18	GK	RUS	Ivan Konovalov (from (Russia) Astrakhan)
27	MF	SRB	Miloš Krstić (from (Hungary) Diósgyőr)
2	DF	SRB	Miloš Živković (from (Iceland) Víkingur)
8	MF	TUR	Günkut Özer (from Palilulac Niš)
—	FW	MKD	Roberto Stajev (from (North Macedonia) Pelister)
—	FW	SRB	Lazar Mitrović (from Sloga Leskovac)

Out: Note: Flags indicate national team as defined under FIFA eligibility rules; some limited exceptions apply. Players may hold more than one non-FIFA nationality.

No.	Pos.	Nation	Player
3	DF	SRB	Nikola Valentić (to Inđija)
69	MF	SRB	Strahinja Petrović (to Sinđelić Niš)
18	GK	CAN	Milan Borjan (to (Bulgaria) Ludogorets Razgrad)
5	MF	SRB	Pavle Popara (to (United States) Orange County Blues)
13	DF	SRB	Vladan Pavlović (to Radnik Surdulica)
9	FW	SRB	Vladimir Milenković (to Sinđelić Beograd)
15	DF	SRB	Zoran Ljubinković (to Rad)
16	MF	SRB	Milan Ćulum (to Radnik Surdulica)
—	GK	SRB	Miloš Perić (was on loan, now signed for Radnički Pirot)
23	GK	SRB	Aleksandar Kesić (released)
22	MF	SRB	Dejan Babić (to (Israel) Maccabi Yavne, previously brought from Borac Čačak)
8	MF	SRB	Dušan Kolarević (to Rad)
—	FW	SRB	Marko Branković (on loan to Car Konstantin)
40	FW	SRB	Miodrag Todorović (loan extension to Car Konstantin)
—	MF	SRB	Stefan Zdravković (loan extension to Car Konstantin)
13	DF	SRB	Mladen Mitrović (on loan to Car Konstantin, was on loan at Sinđelić Niš)
67	MF	SRB	Nikola Mitrović (on loan to Car Konstantin)
—	FW	SRB	Stefan Vukić (on loan to Bukovik Ražanj, was on loan at Car Konstantin)
50	FW	SRB	Nikola Petković (on loan to Timočanin, was on loan at Sinđelić Niš)
—	GK	SRB	Ivan Doderović (on loan to Bobište, was on loan at Ropotovo)
—	DF	SRB	Lazar Jovanović (on loan to Sinđelić Niš)
—	DF	SRB	Dragomir Nikolić (on loan to Sinđelić Niš)
—	FW	MNE	Mitar Klikovac (to Sinđelić Niš)
17	DF	SRB	Nikola Ignjatijević (to OFK Beograd, previously brought from (Ukraine) Zorya Luhansk)
—	MF	SRB	Petar Nikolić (released)
—	FW	SRB	Aleksandar Bogdanović (to Red Star Belgrade youth)
—	DF	SRB	Jovan Marinković (to Sinđelić Niš)
—	MF	SRB	Stefan Zlatanović (to Sinđelić Niš)
—	DF	SRB	Nemanja Jovanović (to Sinđelić Niš)
5	DF	SRB	Lazar Rosić (to Vojvodina, previously brought from Radnički 1923)
1	GK	SRB	Nenad Filipović (released)
2	DF	SRB	Bojan Đorđević (released, previously brought from Novi Pazar)
99	FW	SRB	Miloš Trifunović (to (Australia) Newcastle Jets, previously brought from (Kazakhstan) Atyrau)
25	GK	SRB	Nikola Vasiljević (to Radnik Surdulica)

=== Jagodina ===
In: Note: Flags indicate national team as defined under FIFA eligibility rules; some limited exceptions apply. Players may hold more than one non-FIFA nationality.

No.	Pos.	Nation	Player
3	DF	SRB	Ivan Miladinović (loan return from Sloga Kraljevo)
15	DF	MNE	Jovan Baošić (from (Montenegro) Mogren)
8	MF	SRB	Miloš Ožegović (from Sinđelić Beograd)
1	GK	SRB	Lazar Tatić (from Sloga Kraljevo)
17	FW	SRB	Miloš Deletić (from (Romania) Clinceni)
36	MF	SRB	Stefan Nedović (from Radnik Surdulica)
30	MF	SRB	Aleksandar Stoimirović (free, last with (Greece) Ermionida)
9	FW	SRB	Mladen Popović (from Sloboda Užice)
38	FW	GHA	Francis Kyeremeh (from (Ghana) BA Stars)
50	FW	FRA	Goran Jerković (from (Thailand) Army United)
20	DF	SRB	Slavko Marić (from (Georgia (country)) Dila Gori)
19	MF	SRB	Zoran Knežević (from (Iran) Padideh)
14	MF	SRB	Stefan Petrović (from Sloga PM)
44	GK	SRB	Aleksa Dodić (from Red Star Belgrade)
99	MF	SRB	Nemanja Ivanović (from Red Star Belgrade)
12	GK	SRB	Nikola Stanimirović (from Red Star Niš)

Out: Note: Flags indicate national team as defined under FIFA eligibility rules; some limited exceptions apply. Players may hold more than one non-FIFA nationality.

No.	Pos.	Nation	Player
91	FW	BIH	Vladimir Jovančić (retired)
26	DF	MNE	Vladimir Ilić (released)
7	MF	SRB	Milan Đurić (to (Croatia) Istra 1961)
23	MF	SRB	Miloš Lepović (to Mladost Lučani)
19	DF	SRB	Aleksandar Živanović (to Mladost Lučani)
44	GK	SRB	Anđelko Đuričić (released)
99	MF	SRB	Nemanja Arsenijević (to Rad)
4	MF	BIH	Nikola Popara (to (Switzerland) Biel-Bienne)
3	DF	SRB	Aleksandar Varjačić (to Karađorđe Topola)
50	FW	NGR	Samuel Nnamani (to Donji Srem)
—	DF	SRB	Lazar Stojković (to Sloga Despotovac, was on loan at Tabane Trgovački)
1	GK	SRB	Nikola Perić (to Vojvodina)
9	FW	SRB	Đorđe Šušnjar (to (Switzerland) Lugano)
34	FW	MNE	Miladin Vujošević (to Sloga Despotovac, was on loan at Tabane Trgovački)
—	DF	SRB	Kristijan Soldatović (to Sloga Požega, was on loan at Tabane Trgovački)
—	DF	SRB	Miloš Trifunović (released)
—	DF	SRB	Ivan Obradović (loan extension to Levač)
—	GK	SRB	Đorđe Krstić (on loan to Morava Ribare, was on loan at Levač)
—	MF	SRB	Bora Đurić (loan extension to Morava Ribare)
—	DF	SRB	Siniša Urošević (loan extension to Morava Ribare)
—	DF	SRB	Filip Nikolić (on loan to Morava Ribare)
—	DF	SRB	Stefan Pavlović (on loan to Morava Ribare)
—	DF	SRB	Miloš Mišković (was on loan, now signed with Sloga Despotovac)
—	DF	SRB	Boban Vasov (loan extension to Tabane Trgovački)
—	DF	SRB	Lazar Knežević (loan extension to Tabane Trgovački)
99	MF	SRB	Lazar Cvetković (loan extension to Tabane Trgovački)
12	GK	SRB	Miroslav Stamenković (on loan to Tabane Trgovački, previously brought from same club)
7	MF	SRB	Marko Janković (on loan to Tabane Trgovački)
77	MF	SRB	Nemanja Milošević (on loan to Tabane Trgovački)
—	FW	SRB	Marko Vasiljević (on loan to Tabane Trgovački)
—	MF	SRB	Lazar Marčetić (on loan to Tabane Trgovački)
38	MF	SRB	Bogdan Jovanović (on loan to Tabane Trgovački)
14	FW	BIH	Mićo Kuzmanović (to (Bosnia and Herzegovina) Borac Banja Luka)
17	DF	SRB	Nikola Antić (to Vojvodina)
50	FW	SRB	Nikola Radović (to BSK Borča, previously brought from Sloga Kraljevo)
91	FW	SRB	Srđan Ristić (on loan to Tabane Trgovački, previously brought from Dinamo Vranje)
20	DF	SRB	Slađan Mijatović (loan extension to Tabane Trgovački)
44	GK	SRB	Lazar Đorđević (to (Slovenia) NK Krško youth)

=== Spartak Subotica ===
In: Note: Flags indicate national team as defined under FIFA eligibility rules; some limited exceptions apply. Players may hold more than one non-FIFA nationality.

No.	Pos.	Nation	Player
1	GK	SRB	Budimir Janošević (loan return from (Turkey) Adana Demirspor)
27	MF	SRB	Milan Makarić (from Vojvodina)
3	DF	SRB	Marko Marinković (on loan from Red Star Belgrade)
18	MF	SRB	Dušan Živković (on loan from Red Star Belgrade)
2	MF	NGR	Eke Uzoma (from (Hungary) Pécs)
23	FW	SRB	Miloš Bogunović (from Donji Srem)
24	MF	MNE	Janko Tumbasević (from Vojvodina)
30	DF	MNE	Ermin Alić (from (Spain) Villarreal B)
28	FW	SRB	Dušan Tešić (from Mladost Lučani)
5	MF	SRB	Milan Jokić (from Borac Čačak)
40	FW	MNE	Bojan Božović (from (Saudi Arabia) Al-Shoalah)
66	DF	SRB	Marko Klisura (from Novi Pazar)

Out: Note: Flags indicate national team as defined under FIFA eligibility rules; some limited exceptions apply. Players may hold more than one non-FIFA nationality.

No.	Pos.	Nation	Player
11	DF	SRB	Duško Dukić (to (Armenia) Alashkert)
23	DF	SRB	Mladen Lazarević (to Napredak Kruševac)
24	DF	SRB	Slobodan Jakovljević (to (Bosnia and Herzegovina) Radnik Bijeljina)
18	MF	SRB	Novica Maksimović (to Vojvodina)
5	MF	SRB	Nenad Lukić (to Bežanija)
10	MF	SRB	Milorad Balabanović (to Bačka BP)
1	GK	SRB	Dušan Rašeta (to Mladost Apatin)
13	FW	SRB	Željko Žerađanin (to Sloga PM)
2	MF	SRB	Srđan Plavšić (to Red Star Belgrade)
9	FW	SRB	Dejan Georgijević (to Inđija)
—	MF	SRB	Miljan Ljubenović (to (Bosnia and Herzegovina) Krupa, was on loan at Bačka 1901)
—	FW	SRB	Marko Matijašević (to OFK Odžaci, was on loan at Senta)
—		SRB	Miloš Tadić (on loan to SFS Borac Paraćin)
—	FW	SRB	Milan Đokić (on loan to TSC Bačka Topola)
—	MF	SRB	Marko Stošić (on loan to Senta)
29	FW	SRB	Miloš Manojlović (on loan to Senta)
20	DF	SRB	Dimitrije Tomović (on loan to Senta, previously brought from Bane Raška)
—		SRB	Mario Mijatović (on loan to Tisa Adorjan)
—		SRB	Nikola Savić (on loan to Obilić Novi Kneževac)
—	DF	SRB	Igor Zobenica (on loan to Vinogradar Hajdukovo)
—	MF	SRB	Aleksa Matić (loan extension to Bačka 1901)
—	MF	SRB	Aleksandar Milikić (on loan to Bačka 1901)
5	DF	SRB	Nemanja Ćalasan (on loan to Bačka 1901, previously brought from same club)
—	FW	SRB	Zvonko Jakovljević (on loan to Bačka 1901, was on loan at Senta)
22	DF	SRB	Nikola Banjac (loan extension to Bačka 1901)
13	MF	SRB	Danijel Zlatković (loan extension to Bačka 1901)
—	MF	SRB	Stefan Torbica (on loan to Bačka 1901, previously brought from Mačva Šabac)
25	GK	SRB	Đorđe Lazović (to Proleter Novi Sad)

=== Voždovac ===
In: Note: Flags indicate national team as defined under FIFA eligibility rules; some limited exceptions apply. Players may hold more than one non-FIFA nationality.

No.	Pos.	Nation	Player
7	MF	SRB	Nikola Beljić (from (Greece) Xanthi F.C.)
50	DF	BIH	Borislav Terzić (from Radnički 1923)
1	GK	SRB	Zoran Popović (from Napredak Kruševac)
17	DF	BIH	Petar Jovanović (from (Romania) Universitatea Cluj)
26	MF	SRB	Nikola Srećković (from Rad)
20	MF	SRB	Nenad Stanković (from BASK)
8	MF	SRB	Risto Ristović (from (Greece) AEL)
—	MF	SRB	Đorđe Simić (from Vršac)
23	MF	BIH	Vladan Grujić (from (Bosnia and Herzegovina) Borac Banja Luka)
44	FW	SRB	Alen Mašović (from Borac Čačak)
11	FW	SRB	Jovan Stojanović (from Vojvodina)
3	DF	SRB	Miloš Mihajlov (from (Kazakhstan) Zhetysu)
27	DF	SRB	Marko Jovanović (free, last with (Poland) Wisła Kraków)
14	MF	SRB	Elmir Asani (from Vojvodina)
15	FW	SRB	Nenad Marinković (on loan from Partizan)
9	FW	SRB	Nikola Ćirković (from (Belarus) Minsk)
28	MF	SRB	Jovica Blagojević (from Rad youth)

Out: Note: Flags indicate national team as defined under FIFA eligibility rules; some limited exceptions apply. Players may hold more than one non-FIFA nationality.

No.	Pos.	Nation	Player
29	DF	SRB	Danilo Nikolić (released)
14	MF	SLO	Davor Škerjanc (to (Slovenia) Koper)
3	DF	MKD	Tome Kitanovski (to Mladost Lučani)
8	MF	SRB	Milan Jokić (to Borac Čačak)
7	FW	SLO	Dejan Đermanović (loan return to (Slovenia) Olimpija Ljubljana)
27	GK	BIH	Nemanja Supić (to Red Star Belgrade)
20	MF	SLO	Anej Lovrečič (to (Cyprus) Ayia Napa)
1	GK	MNE	Darko Božović (retired)
50	FW	SRB	Miloš Džugurdić (to Mladost Lučani)
—	FW	SRB	Vladimir Trifunović (to (Greece) AE Farkadonas, was on loan at Železnik)
12	GK	SRB	Milan Opačić (to Crvena Zvezda MML)
11	MF	SRB	Nikola Karaklajić (to Čukarički)
2	DF	SRB	Predrag Stanimirović (on loan to Sinđelić Beograd)
23	FW	SRB	Vanja Stanću (on loan to Crvena Zvezda MML)
16	FW	SRB	Nenad Radonjić (on loan to Radnički Beograd)
—	DF	SRB	Nemanja Anđelković (to Mokra Gora)
—	MF	SRB	Emil Hasanagić (to Crvena Zvezda MML)
15	DF	SRB	Danijel Stojković (on loan to BSK Borča)
—	DF	GER	Stefan Kukoljac (on loan to Crvena Zvezda MML, previously free agent)

=== Borac Čačak ===
In: Note: Flags indicate national team as defined under FIFA eligibility rules; some limited exceptions apply. Players may hold more than one non-FIFA nationality.

No.	Pos.	Nation	Player
34	FW	SRB	Srđan Vujaklija (from Proleter Novi Sad)
23	MF	SRB	Dušan Mićić (free, last with (Belgium) Lierse)
2	DF	SRB	Aleksandar Tanasin (from Proleter Novi Sad)
85	DF	SRB	Miljan Jablan (free, last with (Kazakhstan) Kaisar)
26	MF	SRB	Stefan Vukmirović (from Radnik Surdulica)
21	MF	SRB	Branislav Tomić (loan return from Polet Ljubić)
80	MF	SRB	Filip Knežević (from Partizan)
9	MF	MNE	Darko Zorić (on loan from (Greece) AEK)
25	DF	SRB	Stefan Đorđević (from Red Star Belgrade)

Out: Note: Flags indicate national team as defined under FIFA eligibility rules; some limited exceptions apply. Players may hold more than one non-FIFA nationality.

No.	Pos.	Nation	Player
8	MF	SRB	Dejan Babić (to Radnički Niš)
1	GK	SRB	Nikola Petrić (to Čukarički)
10	MF	SRB	Marko Zoćević (to Vojvodina)
7	FW	SRB	Slaviša Stojanović (to Radnik Surdulica)
20	MF	BIH	Rade Krunić (to (Italy) Empoli)
15	DF	SRB	Aleksandar Gojković (to Radnik Surdulica)
17	DF	SRB	Mario Maslać (to (Croatia) Osijek)
3	DF	MNE	Risto Radunović (to (Montenegro) Budućnost Podgorica)
2	DF	SRB	Nikola Boranijašević (to (Latvia) Ventspils)
51	FW	SRB	Ognjen Ožegović (to Vojvodina)
22	DF	SRB	Ivan Josović (to Javor Ivanjica)
24	FW	SRB	Alen Mašović (to Voždovac)
25	MF	BIH	Mario Božić (to Loznica)
6	DF	PLE	Javier Cohene (to (Portugal) Atlético CP)
7	FW	SRB	Nikola Nešović (to Napredak Kruševac)
—	DF	SRB	Stefan Kurandić (on loan to Sloga Kraljevo)
—	FW	SRB	Jovan Mihajlović (on loan to Jedinstvo Putevi, was on loan at Polet Ljubić)
21	FW	SRB	Nikola Pantović (on loan to Polet Ljubić)
—	MF	SRB	Zoran Petrović (was on loan, now signed with Polet Ljubić)
—	FW	SRB	Vukašin Drakulić (was on loan, now signed with Polet Ljubić)
—	GK	SRB	Strahinja Srdanović (on loan to Polet Ljubić)
—	MF	SRB	Dušan Đorić (on loan to Polet Ljubić)
—	DF	SRB	Radojko Cerović (to Sloboda Čačak, was on loan at Polet Ljubić)
—	MF	SRB	Dragan Radosavljević (to Sloga Požega)
—	DF	SRB	Labud Bogićević (to Polet Ljubić)
—	MF	SRB	Lazar Kalajanović (to Crvena Zvezda MML, was on loan at Polet Ljubić)
—	MF	SRB	Nemanja Kruševac (on loan to Sloboda Čačak)
50	MF	SRB	Milan Jokić (to Spartak Subotica, previously brought from Voždovac)
5	MF	SRB	Dejan Radosavljević (to Sloga Kraljevo)
22	DF	SRB	Dušan Đorđević (on loan to Polet Ljubić)

=== Radnik Surdulica ===
In: Note: Flags indicate national team as defined under FIFA eligibility rules; some limited exceptions apply. Players may hold more than one non-FIFA nationality.

No.	Pos.	Nation	Player
9	MF	SRB	Uroš Mirković (from Donji Srem)
24	MF	SRB	Milan Ćulum (from Radnički Niš)
30	DF	SRB	Vladan Pavlović (from Radnički Niš)
11	FW	SRB	Slaviša Stojanović (from Borac Čačak)
2	DF	SRB	Predrag Đorđević (from Mladost Lučani)
23	DF	SRB	Marko Putinčanin (free, last with (Kazakhstan) Zhetysu)
7	FW	SRB	Miloš Stanković (from Moravac Mrštane)
10	MF	SRB	Lazar Arsić (from (Greece) Apollon Smyrnis)
14	FW	GHA	Zakaria Suraka (from Inđija)
22	DF	SRB	Vukašin Tomić (from (Albania) Flamurtari)
18	MF	SRB	Petar Stamatović (from Tabane Trgovački)
15	DF	SRB	Aleksandar Gojković (from Borac Čačak)
86	DF	SRB	Miloš Marković (from (Romania) Ceahlăul)
12	GK	SRB	Borivoje Ristić (from Čukarički)
31	GK	SRB	Nikola Vasiljević (from Radnički Niš)

Out: Note: Flags indicate national team as defined under FIFA eligibility rules; some limited exceptions apply. Players may hold more than one non-FIFA nationality.

No.	Pos.	Nation	Player
7	FW	SRB	Nikola Mojsilović (loan return to Vojvodina)
2	DF	SRB	Nikola Anđelković (to Dinamo Vranje)
30	DF	SRB	Dejan Živković (to Smederevo 1924)
23	DF	SRB	Zoran Belošević (to (Canada) Milton)
18	MF	SRB	Stefan Nedović (to Jagodina)
11	FW	SRB	Vladan Binić (released)
14	MF	SRB	Stefan Vukmirović (to Borac Čačak)
—	FW	SRB	Rade Veljović (released)
9	FW	SRB	Marko Jakšić (to (Bosnia and Herzegovina) Drina Zvornik)
10	FW	SRB	Milan Petrović (released)
22	GK	SRB	Goran Ristić (retired)
—	MF	GHA	Joseph Cudjoe (released)
15	FW	SRB	Marko Memedović (to Sloga PM)
—	FW	SRB	Nikola Stanković (to Radan Lebane, was on loan at Ozren Sokobanja)
—	DF	MKD	Hristijan Dragarski (to (North Macedonia) Mladost Carev Dvor, previously brought from (Romania) Concordia Chiajna)
22	MF	SRB	Bojan Čukić (on loan to Sloga PM, previously brought from Moravac Mrštane)

=== Javor Ivanjica ===
In: Note: Flags indicate national team as defined under FIFA eligibility rules; some limited exceptions apply. Players may hold more than one non-FIFA nationality.

No.	Pos.	Nation	Player
7	MF	BRA	Eliomar (on loan from Partizan)
33	FW	SRB	Marko Zečević (from Bačka BP)
15	DF	SRB	Đorđe Crnomarković (from Donji Srem)
21	MF	SRB	Zoran Švonja (from (Italy) Parma)
3	DF	SRB	Ivan Josović (from Borac Čačak)
23	GK	SRB	Marko Knežević (from Bežanija)
8	MF	RUS	Maksim Martusevich (from (Russia) CSKA Moscow)
4	DF	SRB	Nikola Mitrović (from Jedinstvo Putevi)

Out: Note: Flags indicate national team as defined under FIFA eligibility rules; some limited exceptions apply. Players may hold more than one non-FIFA nationality.

No.	Pos.	Nation	Player
—	DF	MNE	Aleksandar Šofranac (was on loan, now signed for (Montenegro) Sutjeska Nikšić)
30	DF	MNE	Nemanja Gojačanin (released)
4	DF	SRB	Petar Mrvić (to (Malta) Vittoriosa)
15	DF	SUI	Emil Osmanović (released)
7	MF	SRB	Sadin Smajović (on loan to Šumadija Kragujevac)
22	MF	SRB	Srđan Simović (released)
24	FW	SRB	Slobodan Dinčić (to Kolubara)
21	MF	SRB	Stanimir Milošković (to Kolubara)
—	MF	SRB	Igor Mitić (to Dunav Prahovo, was on loan at Đerdap Kladovo)
—	DF	SRB	Nikola Jovanović (to Inđija, was on loan at Železničar Lajkovac)
22	FW	MNE	Uroš Đuranović (previously brought from, then returned to (Montenegro) Iskra Danilovgrad)
25	MF	SRB	Filip Lakićević (on loan to Lokomotiva Beograd)
—	GK	SRB	Ivan Bulajić (to Radnički Pirot, was on loan at IMT)
13	MF	SRB	Nemanja Živković (on loan to Loznica)
31	FW	SRB	Andrija Ratković (on loan to Sloga Požega)
8	MF	SRB	Mladen Mićanović (on loan to IMT)
—	FW	SRB	Dejan Savkov (on loan to Sloga BB, was on loan at Lokomotiva Beograd)
—	DF	SRB	Predrag Radojević (was on loan, now signed with Železničar Lajkovac)
12	GK	SRB	Nemanja Jeveričić (on loan to Budućnost Arilje)
—	MF	SRB	Nikola Vasilić (on loan to Budućnost Arilje)
—	FW	SRB	Vujica Luković (on loan to Budućnost Arilje)
2	FW	SRB	Nemanja Srećković (to IMT)
—	MF	NGR	Samson Obagbemiro (on loan to (Montenegro) Iskra Danilovgrad)
—	DF	SRB	Marko Petrović (to Mokra Gora, was on loan at Rudar Kostolac)

=== Metalac Gornji Milanovac ===
In: Note: Flags indicate national team as defined under FIFA eligibility rules; some limited exceptions apply. Players may hold more than one non-FIFA nationality.

No.	Pos.	Nation	Player
33	GK	SRB	Nemanja Belić (from Donji Srem)
15	DF	SRB	Vladimir Otašević (from Mladost Lučani)
23	DF	SRB	Miloš Rnić (free, last with Radnički 1923)
21	MF	SRB	Stefan Bukorac (from (Georgia (country)) Dinamo Tbilisi)
18	FW	SUI	Milan Basrak (from (Bosnia and Herzegovina) Radnički Lukavac)
14	MF	SRB	Nikola Dimitrijević (from Zemun)
9	FW	SRB	Dragan Milovanović (from Radnički 1923)
10	MF	SRB	Igor Stanojević (from (North Macedonia) Pelister)
19	MF	SRB	Nikola Stojković (from Red Star Belgrade)
13	MF	MNE	Stefan Lukačević (from (Montenegro) Bratstvo Cijevna)
2	DF	SRB	Dejan Koraksić (from Novi Pazar)

Out: Note: Flags indicate national team as defined under FIFA eligibility rules; some limited exceptions apply. Players may hold more than one non-FIFA nationality.

No.	Pos.	Nation	Player
15	DF	GHA	Owusu-Ansah Kontoh (released)
19	MF	SRB	Pavle Propadalo (released)
10	MF	SRB	Stevan Živković (to Bežanija)
30	FW	SRB	Nikola Ćirković (to (Belarus) Minsk)
1	GK	SRB	Mitar Pejović (to Mačva Šabac)
17	DF	SRB	Radoslav Vlašić (to Sloga PM)
23	DF	SRB	Dragomir Nikolić (to (Bosnia and Herzegovina) Drina Zvornik, was on loan at Napredak Kruševac)
2	DF	SRB	Nikola Radojičić (released)
—	MF	SRB	Filip Ilić (was on loan, now signed with Takovo)
—	FW	SRB	Nemanja Plećić (released, was on loan at Železničar Lajkovac)
18	FW	SRB	Nikola Vuković (on loan to Karađorđe Topola)
21	FW	SRB	Božidar Šobat (on loan to Karađorđe Topola)
13	MF	SRB	Darko Pavlović (on loan to Jedinstvo Putevi)
—	MF	SRB	Miloš Nikoličić (to Sloga Kraljevo)
—	FW	SRB	Stefan Milošević (on loan to Sloga Kraljevo, was on loan at Karađorđe Topola)
9	FW	SRB	Slađan Nikodijević (to Radnički Svilajnac)

== See also ==
- Serbian SuperLiga
- 2015–16 Serbian SuperLiga
