= List of Serbian football transfers winter 2014–15 =

- This is a list of transfers in Serbian football for the 2014-15 winter transfer window.
- Only moves featuring a Serbian SuperLiga side are listed.
- The order by which the clubs are listed is equal to the classification at the mid-season of the 2014–15 Serbian SuperLiga.

== Serbian SuperLiga ==
=== Partizan ===
In: Note: Flags indicate national team as defined under FIFA eligibility rules; some limited exceptions apply. Players may hold more than one non-FIFA nationality.

No.	Pos.	Nation	Player
10	MF	SRB	Stefan Babović (from Voždovac)
—	DF	SRB	Nemanja Mladenović (loan return from Sloga PM)
20	MF	SRB	Saša Lukić (loan return from Teleoptik)
23	DF	SRB	Miroslav Bogosavac (loan return from Teleoptik)
—	DF	SRB	Stefan Savić (loan return from Novi Pazar)
2	DF	BUL	Ivan Bandalovski (free, last with (Belgium) OH Leuven)
6	DF	SLO	Gregor Balažic (from (Ukraine) Karpaty Lviv)

Out: Note: Flags indicate national team as defined under FIFA eligibility rules; some limited exceptions apply. Players may hold more than one non-FIFA nationality.

No.	Pos.	Nation	Player
6	DF	SRB	Vojislav Stanković (to (Azerbaijan) Inter Baku)
10	FW	CIV	Ismaël Béko Fofana (on loan to (China) Qingdao Jonoon)
—	DF	SRB	Saša Ivković (on loan to Voždovac, was on loan at Bačka Bačka Palanka)
—	MF	SRB	Matija Ljujić (to Rad, was on loan at Mladost Lučani)
—	DF	MKD	Stefan Aškovski (on loan to (North Macedonia) Shkëndija, was on loan at (Norway) Strømsgodset)
—	MF	BRA	Eliomar (on loan to (Greece) AEL, was on loan at (Greece) Pierikos)
27	FW	SRB	Danko Lazović (to (China) Beijing Enterprises)
19	DF	SRB	Branko Pauljević (to (Hungary) Pécsi MFC)
32	FW	SRB	Petar Škuletić (to (Russia) Lokomotiv Moscow)
—	FW	MNE	Filip Vorotović (to (Montenegro) Sutjeska Nikšić)
—	FW	SRB	Nikola Milošević (to Srem Jakovo)

=== Red Star Belgrade ===
In: Note: Flags indicate national team as defined under FIFA eligibility rules; some limited exceptions apply. Players may hold more than one non-FIFA nationality.

No.	Pos.	Nation	Player
16	DF	SEN	Mamadou Mbodj (loan return from Napredak Kruševac)
18	DF	SRB	Miloš Cvetković (from Napredak Kruševac)
3	DF	SRB	Aleksandar Luković (free, last with (Russia) Zenit Saint Petersburg)
33	DF	SRB	Dušan Anđelković (free, last with (Russia) Krasnodar)
7	MF	SRB	Saša Stojanović (from (Romania) Universitatea Cluj)
23	FW	ANT	Josh Parker (from (Slovenia) Domžale)
99	FW	MNE	Petar Orlandić (from (Montenegro) Zeta)
—	DF	SRB	Nenad Cvetković (loan return from IM Rakovica)
—	MF	SRB	Lazar Mitrović (loan return from Sopot)

Out: Note: Flags indicate national team as defined under FIFA eligibility rules; some limited exceptions apply. Players may hold more than one non-FIFA nationality.

No.	Pos.	Nation	Player
—	FW	SRB	Miloš Zukanović (to (Netherlands) NAC Breda)
11	MF	SLO	Nejc Pečnik (to (Japan) JEF United Chiba)
13	DF	SRB	Predrag Đorđević (to Mladost Lučani)
7	FW	SRB	Đorđe Rakić (to (China) Qingdao Hainiu)
25	MF	SRB	Goran Gogić (to (China) Qingdao Hainiu)
—	MF	SRB	Nikola Karaklajić (to Voždovac, was on loan at Sinđelić Beograd)
45	MF	SRB	Milan Jokić (to Voždovac, was on loan at Kolubara)
21	DF	SRB	Marko Mijailović (on loan to Kolubara)
34	DF	SRB	Miloš Stojanović (on loan to Kolubara)
—	MF	SRB	Petar Đuričković (was on loan, now signed with Radnički Niš)
6	DF	SRB	Bogdan Planić (to OFK Beograd)
15	DF	SRB	Nikola Antić (to Jagodina)
—	FW	SRB	Željko Žerađanin (to Spartak Subotica, was on loan at IM Rakovica)
84	FW	SRB	Đorđe Despotović (on loan to (Kazakhstan) Zhetysu)
11	FW	NGR	Gbolahan Salami (loan return to (Nigeria) Warri Wolves)
—	DF	SRB	Miloš Brajović (to OFK Beograd, was on loan at Dinamo Pančevo)
—	DF	SRB	Zlatko Iličić (on loan to Zemun, was on loan at IM Rakovica)
—	GK	SRB	Uroš Grčić (to Borac Lazarevac, was on loan at Turbina Vreoci)
—	FW	SRB	Nikola Đorđević (was on loan, now signed with BASK)
—	FW	MNE	Miloš Vukić (on loan to Hajduk Beograd, was on loan at Dinamo Pančevo)
—	GK	SRB	Ognjen Obradović (on loan to Sopot)

=== Vojvodina ===
In: Note: Flags indicate national team as defined under FIFA eligibility rules; some limited exceptions apply. Players may hold more than one non-FIFA nationality.

No.	Pos.	Nation	Player
2	DF	SRB	Jovica Vasilić (from OFK Beograd)
17	MF	SRB	Dragan Karanov (from Proleter Novi Sad)
99	FW	CMR	John Mary (from (Thailand) Prachuap Khiri Khan)
7	MF	SRB	Ivan Rogač (from (Ukraine) Volyn)
18	MF	GEO	Davit Kokhia (from (Moldova) Zaria Bălți)
23	DF	BIH	Slaviša Radović (from (Bosnia and Herzegovina) Drina Zvornik)
20	MF	SRB	Elmir Asani (loan return from Sloga Temerin)

Out: Note: Flags indicate national team as defined under FIFA eligibility rules; some limited exceptions apply. Players may hold more than one non-FIFA nationality.

No.	Pos.	Nation	Player
9	FW	SRB	Lazar Veselinović (on loan to (South Korea) Pohang Steelers)
—	FW	SRB	Georgije Ilić (released, was on loan at Cement Beočin)
27	FW	SRB	Nikola Mojsilović (on loan to Radnik Surdulica)
18	MF	SRB	Marko Poletanović (to (Belgium) Gent)
—	MF	MNE	Luka Klikovac (to (Montenegro) Zeta)
23	DF	SRB	Igor Đurić (on loan to Rad)
26	MF	BIH	Nikola Popara (to Jagodina)
17	DF	SRB	Marko Živković (to (Lithuania) Sūduva)
28	FW	SRB	Luka Grgić (loan extension to ČSK Čelarevo)
3	DF	SRB	Nenad Kočović (loan extension to ČSK Čelarevo)
21	MF	SRB	Aleksandar Desančić (on loan to Proleter Novi Sad)
31	FW	SRB	Uroš Stamenić (on loan to Proleter Novi Sad)
7	MF	SRB	Enver Alivodić (to (Australia) Newcastle Jets)

=== Čukarički ===
In: Note: Flags indicate national team as defined under FIFA eligibility rules; some limited exceptions apply. Players may hold more than one non-FIFA nationality.

No.	Pos.	Nation	Player
21	MF	SRB	Aleksandar Alempijević (from OFK Beograd)
3	DF	SRB	Đorđe Bašanović (from Brodarac)
77	DF	SRB	Zoran Rendulić (from (China) Shenyang Zhongze)

Out: Note: Flags indicate national team as defined under FIFA eligibility rules; some limited exceptions apply. Players may hold more than one non-FIFA nationality.

No.	Pos.	Nation	Player
19	DF	SRB	Deni Pavlović (to Voždovac)
15	MF	SRB	Stefan Dimić (on loan to Sinđelić Beograd)
—	FW	SRB	Miodrag Gemović (loan extension to Sinđelić Beograd)
—	FW	MNE	Nikola Zvrko (loan extension to Sinđelić Beograd)
44	MF	SRB	Nikola Šakić (on loan to Kolubara, was on loan at Sinđelić Beograd)
27	MF	SRB	Đorđe Radovanović (on loan to Sinđelić Beograd)
—	MF	SRB	Đorđe Isaković (to BASK, was on loan at Sinđelić Beograd)
32	MF	SRB	Mihailo Miljković (on loan to BASK, was on loan at IM Rakovica)
—	MF	SRB	Vanja Hodović (to Železnik)

=== Novi Pazar ===
In: Note: Flags indicate national team as defined under FIFA eligibility rules; some limited exceptions apply. Players may hold more than one non-FIFA nationality.

No.	Pos.	Nation	Player
10	FW	BRA	Richard Falcão (from (Brazil) Jacobina)
5	MF	SRB	Miroljub Kostić (on loan from (Bosnia and Herzegovina) Sarajevo)
11	MF	SRB	Filip Arsenijević (from Jagodina)
23	GK	SRB	Mladen Živković (from Sinđelić Beograd)
—	MF	AUT	Armin Mašović (from (Austria) Vorwärts Steyr)
4	DF	BIH	Željko Đokić (from (Austria) Wacker Innsbruck)
18	MF	ECU	José Gutiérrez (from (Ecuador) LDU Portoviejo)
6	MF	ECU	José Mina (from (Ecuador) El Nacional)
13	FW	SRB	Vuk Sotirović (from Radnički 1923)

Out: Note: Flags indicate national team as defined under FIFA eligibility rules; some limited exceptions apply. Players may hold more than one non-FIFA nationality.

No.	Pos.	Nation	Player
—	FW	SRB	Nebojša Stanojlović (released)
11	FW	SRB	Nemanja Vidaković (to (Malaysia) Sime Darby)
10	FW	SRB	Sead Hadžibulić (to (Slovenia) Koper)
—	DF	SUI	Emil Osmanović (to Javor Ivanjica, was on loan at Jošanica)
91	GK	SRB	Miloš Budaković (to (Bosnia and Herzegovina) Mladost V. O.)
4	DF	SRB	Vladimir Otašević (to Mladost Lučani)
28	MF	SRB	Kenan Ragipović (released)
18	MF	GER	Rijad Tafilović (to (Germany) SVN Zweibrücken)
5	DF	SRB	Miloš Živković (released)
23	DF	SRB	Ibrahim Arifović (to (Montenegro) Berane)
69	DF	SRB	Stefan Savić (loan return to Partizan)
24	MF	SRB	Mihailo Raković (to Dolina Padina, was on loan at Jošanica)
95	FW	SRB	Anes Hot (on loan to Tutin)
—	GK	SRB	Rijad Kahrović (released, was on loan at Jošanica)
—	FW	SRB	Elmir Jusufović (released, was on loan at Jošanica)
—	DF	SRB	Denis Biševac (on loan to Jošanica)

=== OFK Beograd ===
In: Note: Flags indicate national team as defined under FIFA eligibility rules; some limited exceptions apply. Players may hold more than one non-FIFA nationality.

No.	Pos.	Nation	Player
27	DF	SRB	Filip Matović (loan return from Sinđelić Beograd)
—	MF	SRB	Alen Halilović (loan return from Vršac)
32	MF	SRB	Milan Sekulić (loan return from Dinamo Pančevo)
12	GK	SRB	Ognjen Čančarević (from Sloboda Užice)
6	DF	SRB	Bogdan Planić (from Red Star Belgrade)
11	MF	SRB	Miloš Antić (from (Italy) Lazio)
4	MF	SRB	Saša Zdjelar (loan extension from (Greece) Olympiacos)
26	MF	SRB	Zlatko Liščević (from Železničar Lajkovac)
—	DF	SRB	Miloš Brajović (from Red Star Belgrade, to youth squad)

Out: Note: Flags indicate national team as defined under FIFA eligibility rules; some limited exceptions apply. Players may hold more than one non-FIFA nationality.

No.	Pos.	Nation	Player
11	FW	MNE	Ivan Vuković (to (Montenegro) Mladost Podgorica)
27	MF	SRB	Aleksandar Alempijević (to Čukarički)
26	DF	SRB	Milan Obradović (to Napredak Kruševac)
12	GK	MNE	Miloš Dragojević (to (North Macedonia) Pelister)
2	DF	SRB	Jovica Vasilić (to Vojvodina)
6	DF	SRB	Nikola Vasiljević (to (Romania) Pandurii)
21	MF	SRB	Stefan Kovačević (to Sloboda Užice)
—	DF	SRB	Ognjen Vukomanović (to Dragačevo, was on loan at Hajduk Beograd)
32	MF	SRB	Mihajlo Cakić (to (Moldova) Tiraspol)
—	FW	SRB	Bogdan Tepić (to Proleter Novi Sad, was on loan at ČSK Čelarevo)
—	DF	SRB	Milovan Filipović (on loan to Hajduk Beograd)
—	DF	SRB	Igor Gajević (on loan to Sopot)
—	DF	SRB	Ognjen Vukomanović (to Pobeda Beloševac, was on loan at Hajduk Beograd)
—	MF	SRB	Alen Halilović (to Radnički SM, was on loan at Vršac)
—	DF	SRB	Luka Simonović (to BASK)
—	FW	SRB	Ilija Erdeljan (to Železnik)

=== Jagodina ===
In: Note: Flags indicate national team as defined under FIFA eligibility rules; some limited exceptions apply. Players may hold more than one non-FIFA nationality.

No.	Pos.	Nation	Player
13	GK	SRB	Đorđe Nikolić (from Partizan youth)
11	MF	SRB	Uroš Nikolić (from (Hungary) Videoton)
14	MF	SRB	Veljko Antonijević (from Sloga Kraljevo)
3	DF	SRB	Aleksandar Varjačić (loan return from Tabane Trgovački)
50	FW	NGR	Samuel Nnamani (from Sloga PM)
4	MF	BIH	Nikola Popara (from Vojvodina)
17	DF	SRB	Nikola Antić (from Red Star Belgrade)
32	FW	SRB	Zoran Mihailović (from Brodarac)

Out: Note: Flags indicate national team as defined under FIFA eligibility rules; some limited exceptions apply. Players may hold more than one non-FIFA nationality.

No.	Pos.	Nation	Player
11	FW	USA	Freddy Adu (to (Finland) KuPS)
50	MF	MKD	Nikola Jakimovski (to (Italy) Varese)
77	MF	SRB	Filip Arsenijević (to Novi Pazar)
14	FW	SRB	Ognjen Ožegović (to Borac Čačak)
4	DF	CRO	Dajan Šimac (released)
—	GK	SRB	Petar Jokić (to Jedinstvo Paraćin, was on loan at Tabane Trgovački)
31	MF	SRB	Ivan Cvetković (to (Kazakhstan) Zhetysu)
3	DF	SRB	Ivan Miladinović (to Sloga Kraljevo, was on loan at Tabane Trgovački)
34	FW	MNE	Miladin Vujošević (on loan to Tabane Trgovački)
—	DF	SRB	Kristijan Soldatović (on loan to Tabane Trgovački)
—	MF	SRB	Aleksa Todorović (on loan to Tabane Trgovački)
—	DF	SRB	Siniša Urošević (on loan to Morava Ribare, was on loan at Tabane Trgovački)
—	MF	SRB	Nikola Marinković (retired, was on loan at Tabane Trgovački)
—	FW	SRB	Nemanja Stanojević (on loan to Tabane Trgovački, was on loan at Car Konstantin)
—	MF	MNE	Luka Petričević (to (United States) Orange County Blues, was on loan at (Montenegro) Mogren)
29	MF	SRB	Vuk Mitošević (on loan to (Kazakhstan) Kaisar)

=== Mladost Lučani ===
In: Note: Flags indicate national team as defined under FIFA eligibility rules; some limited exceptions apply. Players may hold more than one non-FIFA nationality.

No.	Pos.	Nation	Player
14	DF	SRB	Milan Jagodić (from Jedinstvo Putevi)
32	FW	SRB	Lazar Jovanović (from Sloboda Užice)
23	GK	SRB	Nemanja Latinović (from Bačka BP)
91	GK	SRB	Nemanja Radukić (from Milicionar Bogatić)
58	DF	SRB	Vladimir Otašević (from Novi Pazar)
13	DF	SRB	Predrag Đorđević (from Red Star Belgrade)
8	FW	UKR	Yevhen Pavlov (from (Russia) Sokol Saratov)
—	MF	CIV	Baba Salia (from (Thailand) Royal Thai Navy)
27	MF	SRB	Nikola Milošević (from Sloboda Užice)

Out: Note: Flags indicate national team as defined under FIFA eligibility rules; some limited exceptions apply. Players may hold more than one non-FIFA nationality.

No.	Pos.	Nation	Player
27	MF	SRB	Matija Ljujić (loan return to Partizan)
23	GK	SRB	Miloje Preković (to Sloga Kraljevo)
14	FW	SRB	Gradimir Grujičić (on loan to Šumadija 1903)
3	DF	SRB	Rade Pejić (to Proleter Novi Sad)
58	DF	MNE	Stefan Cicmil (to (Bosnia and Herzegovina) Mladost V. O.)
8	MF	SRB	Nemanja Stojanović (to Sloboda Užice)
32	DF	SRB	Igor Petrović (to Moravac Mrštane)
—	DF	SRB	Miljan Stojanović (to Radnik Surdulica, was on loan at Ozren Sokobanja)
33	MF	SRB	Miloš Crnomarković (on loan to Sloboda Užice)
19	DF	SRB	Nemanja Milunović (to (Belarus) BATE Borisov)
91	GK	SRB	Bojan Tanasijević (on loan to Mačva Šabac)

=== Spartak Subotica ===
In: Note: Flags indicate national team as defined under FIFA eligibility rules; some limited exceptions apply. Players may hold more than one non-FIFA nationality.

No.	Pos.	Nation	Player
7	MF	KAZ	Maxim Fedin (from (Kazakhstan) Bayterek Astana)
28	FW	SRB	Đorđe Ivanović (loan return from Senta)
24	DF	SRB	Slobodan Jakovljević (from Radnik Surdulica)
13	FW	SRB	Željko Žerađanin (from Red Star Belgrade)
23	DF	SRB	Mladen Lazarević (from (Kazakhstan) Ordabasy)

Out: Note: Flags indicate national team as defined under FIFA eligibility rules; some limited exceptions apply. Players may hold more than one non-FIFA nationality.

No.	Pos.	Nation	Player
24	DF	MNE	Ilija Radović (to Napredak Kruševac)
1	GK	SRB	Budimir Janošević (on loan to (Turkey) Adana Demirspor)
9	FW	SRB	Dragan Janković (to Sloboda Užice)
23	MF	SRB	Milan Vojvodić (to (Austria) SPG Mötz, was on loan at Bačka 1901)
7	FW	SRB	Zvonko Jakovljević (on loan to Senta)
13	FW	SRB	Danijel Zlatković (on loan to Bačka 1901)
9	MF	SRB	Miljan Ljubenović (loan extension to Bačka 1901)
22	DF	SRB	Nikola Banjac (on loan to Bačka 1901)
—	FW	SRB	Marko Matijašević (on loan to Senta, was on loan at Bačka 1901)

=== Rad ===
In: Note: Flags indicate national team as defined under FIFA eligibility rules; some limited exceptions apply. Players may hold more than one non-FIFA nationality.

No.	Pos.	Nation	Player
22	MF	SRB	Matija Ljujić (from Partizan)
26	GK	SRB	Filip Erić (from (Bosnia and Herzegovina) Drina Zvornik)
23	DF	SRB	Igor Đurić (on loan from Vojvodina)
5	DF	SRB	Miloš Obradović (from Voždovac)
69	FW	SRB	Stefan Mihajlović (free, last with Red Star Belgrade)

Out: Note: Flags indicate national team as defined under FIFA eligibility rules; some limited exceptions apply. Players may hold more than one non-FIFA nationality.

No.	Pos.	Nation	Player
22	MF	MKD	Perica Stančeski (to (Kyrgyzstan) Dordoi Bishkek)
51	FW	SRB	Slavko Perović (to (Turkey) Alanyaspor)
55	DF	BIH	Delimir Bajić (to (Oman) Saham)
92	GK	SRB	Aleksandar Jovanović (to Donji Srem)
86	DF	SRB	Miloš Marković (to (Romania) Ceahlăul)
79	GK	CAN	Jovan Lučić (to Hajduk Beograd)
18	FW	MNE	Nikola Vujnović (loan return to Radnički Obrenovac)
—	MF	SRB	Nikola Sladaković (to Srem Jakovo)

=== Napredak ===
In: Note: Flags indicate national team as defined under FIFA eligibility rules; some limited exceptions apply. Players may hold more than one non-FIFA nationality.

No.	Pos.	Nation	Player
29	FW	SRB	Aleksandar Đoković (from Bežanija)
21	FW	SRB	Darko Lemajić (from Inđija)
24	FW	CRO	Tomislav Ivičić (from (Croatia) Rudeš)
10	MF	SRB	Dušan Pantelić (from Voždovac)
31	DF	SRB	Nemanja Trajković (from BASK)
15	DF	SRB	Miloš Vranjanin (from Brodarac)
22	DF	MNE	Miloš Radulović (from (Montenegro) Mornar)
3	DF	SRB	Dušan Punoševac (from Donji Srem)
80	MF	SRB	Marko Vučetić (from (Turkey) Adanaspor)
5	DF	MNE	Ilija Radović (from Spartak Subotica)
23	DF	SRB	Dragomir Nikolić (on loan from Metalac GM)
33	DF	SRB	Milan Obradović (from OFK Beograd)

Out: Note: Flags indicate national team as defined under FIFA eligibility rules; some limited exceptions apply. Players may hold more than one non-FIFA nationality.

No.	Pos.	Nation	Player
21	MF	SRB	Dušan Mićić (to (Belgium) Lierse)
5	DF	SRB	Vukašin Tomić (to (Albania) Flamurtari)
87	MF	BRA	Tai (to (Bosnia and Herzegovina) Široki Brijeg)
34	DF	SEN	Mamadou Mbodj (loan return to Red Star Belgrade)
10	MF	SRB	Predrag Govedarica (loan return to (Kazakhstan) Irtysh Pavlodar)
90	DF	SRB	Miloš Cvetković (to Red Star Belgrade)
22	MF	SRB	Srđan Mulćan (released)
33	DF	SRB	Zoran Belošević (to Radnik Surdulica)
13	MF	SRB	Strahinja Petrović (to Radnički Niš)
—	DF	SRB	Mladen Petrović (to Tabane Trgovački, was on loan at Bežanija)
20	MF	SRB	Predrag Lazić (to Radnik Surdulica)
23	DF	BIH	Nemanja Janičić (to (Uzbekistan) Lokomotiv Tashkent)
19	FW	MNE	Bojan Božović (to (Saudi Arabia) Al-Shoalah)
29	MF	SRB	Darko Simić (to Šumadija 1903)
11	FW	SRB	Nikola Popović (on loan to Kolubara)
—	MF	SRB	Nenad Maksimović (on loan to Kopaonik Brus, previously brought from Tabane Trgovački)

=== Voždovac ===
In: Note: Flags indicate national team as defined under FIFA eligibility rules; some limited exceptions apply. Players may hold more than one non-FIFA nationality.

No.	Pos.	Nation	Player
41	DF	SRB	Saša Ivković (on loan from Partizan)
11	MF	SRB	Nikola Karaklajić (from Red Star Belgrade)
5	DF	SRB	Miloš Radivojević (from Inđija)
22	GK	SRB	Marko Milošević (from Sinđelić Beograd)
20	MF	SLO	Anej Lovrečič (from (Slovenia) Celje)
8	MF	SRB	Milan Jokić (from Red Star Belgrade)
9	FW	SRB	Predrag Sikimić (from (Thailand) Singhtarua)
7	FW	SLO	Dejan Djermanović (on loan from (Slovenia) Olimpija Ljubljana)
21	DF	SRB	Deni Pavlović (from Čukarički)

Out: Note: Flags indicate national team as defined under FIFA eligibility rules; some limited exceptions apply. Players may hold more than one non-FIFA nationality.

No.	Pos.	Nation	Player
7	MF	SRB	Nikola Beljić (to (Greece) Skoda Xanthi)
52	MF	SRB	Zoran Marušić (loan return to Sloga Kraljevo)
99	FW	SRB	Dragoljub Anđelković (loan return to Sloga Kraljevo)
23	DF	SRB	Miloš Obradović (to Rad)
5	DF	SRB	Miodrag Stošić (released)
22	MF	SRB	Aleksandar Petrović (released)
55	MF	SRB	Dušan Pantelić (to Napredak Kruševac)
9	FW	SRB	Ognjen Damnjanović (released)
11	FW	SRB	Nenad Injac (released)
8	MF	SRB	Stefan Babović (to Partizan)
21	DF	SRB	Miloš Mihajlov (to (Kazakhstan) Zhetysu)
—	FW	SRB	Relja Radovanović (to IMT)

=== Donji Srem ===
In: Note: Flags indicate national team as defined under FIFA eligibility rules; some limited exceptions apply. Players may hold more than one non-FIFA nationality.

No.	Pos.	Nation	Player
3	DF	SRB	Miloš Josimov (from (Slovakia) Slovan Bratislava)
23	MF	SRB	Uroš Mirković (from Sinđelić Beograd)
12	GK	SRB	Matija Šegavac (loan return from Dunav Stari Banovci)
9	FW	MKD	Martin Hristov (from (North Macedonia) Teteks)
19	DF	MKD	Risto Mitrevski (on loan from (Bosnia and Herzegovina) Sarajevo)
14	DF	SRB	Đorđe Vukobrat (from (Oman) Al-Nasr)
1	GK	SRB	Aleksandar Jovanović (from Rad)
8	MF	SRB	Luka Sinđić (from (Italy) Francavilla)
21	MF	SRB	Zoran Švonja (from (Italy) Parma)
10	MF	SRB	Igor Jelić (from Bežanija)
22	FW	SRB	Miloš Bogunović (from (Thailand) Bangkok United)
77	MF	SRB	Almedin Zilkić (from Vojvodina (youth))
20	DF	MNE	Lazar Đokić (from (Montenegro) Mladost Podgorica)

Out: Note: Flags indicate national team as defined under FIFA eligibility rules; some limited exceptions apply. Players may hold more than one non-FIFA nationality.

No.	Pos.	Nation	Player
10	MF	BIH	Rade Krunić (loan return to (Italy) Hellas Verona)
8	MF	SRB	Stefan Bukorac (to (Georgia (country)) Dinamo Tbilisi)
22	MF	SRB	Đuro Zec (to Borac Čačak)
3	DF	SRB	Dušan Punoševac (to Napredak Kruševac)
14	DF	SRB	Nemanja Lakić-Pešić (to Radnički Niš)
1	GK	SRB	Miloš Milinović (to Inđija)
12	GK	SRB	Dragan Starčević (to Sremac Vojka)
15	DF	SRB	Dušan Ivanov (released)
30	FW	MNE	Balša Peličić (released)
23	FW	BIH	Marko Mazalica (to (Bosnia and Herzegovina) Krupa)
9	FW	BIH	Damjan Marčeta (to (Bosnia and Herzegovina) Borac Banja Luka)
44	MF	SRB	Srđan Grujičić (to Sloboda Užice)
19	MF	SRB	Goran Janković (to Zemun)
99	FW	SRB	Vladimir Tufegdžić (to Sinđelić Beograd)
21	MF	SRB	Bojan Beljić (to (Thailand) BEC Tero Sasana)
—	MF	SRB	Miloš Ožegović (to Sinđelić Beograd, was on loan at Mačva Šabac)

=== Borac Čačak ===
In: Note: Flags indicate national team as defined under FIFA eligibility rules; some limited exceptions apply. Players may hold more than one non-FIFA nationality.

No.	Pos.	Nation	Player
77	MF	SRB	Đuro Zec (from Donji Srem)
22	DF	SRB	Ivan Josović (from Javor)
51	FW	SRB	Ognjen Ožegović (from Jagodina)
36	MF	GHA	Michael Tawiah (from (Bulgaria) Haskovo)
20	MF	BIH	Rade Krunić (from (Italy) Hellas Verona)
37	FW	SRB	Vladimir Krstić (from Kolubara)
35	DF	SRB	Đorđe Lazović (from Kolubara)
21	FW	SRB	Nikola Pantović (from Sloboda Čačak)

Out: Note: Flags indicate national team as defined under FIFA eligibility rules; some limited exceptions apply. Players may hold more than one non-FIFA nationality.

No.	Pos.	Nation	Player
20	MF	MNE	Baćo Nikolić (to (Albania) Flamurtari)
14	MF	SRB	Radan Šunjevarić (released)
13	DF	SRB	Dejan Živković (to Radnik Surdulica)
9	FW	SRB	Dejan Đenić (to Metalac GM)
—	DF	SRB	Zvezdan Đorđilović (to Sloga Požega, was on loan at Polet Ljubić)
—	MF	SRB	Mladen Marković (to Žarkovo)

=== Radnički Niš ===
In: Note: Flags indicate national team as defined under FIFA eligibility rules; some limited exceptions apply. Players may hold more than one non-FIFA nationality.

No.	Pos.	Nation	Player
69	MF	SRB	Strahinja Petrović (from Napredak Kruševac)
—	FW	SRB	Miroslav Marković (free, last with Jedinstvo Bošnjace)
7	MF	SRB	Petar Đuričković (was on loan, now signed from Red Star Belgrade)
16	MF	SRB	Milan Ćulum (from Radnički 1923)
91	FW	SRB	Nikola Ašćerić (from (Montenegro) Grbalj)
44	DF	SRB	Nemanja Lakić-Pešić (from Donji Srem)
4	DF	SRB	Radoš Bulatović (from (Moldova) Dacia Chișinău)
20	MF	KGZ	Anton Zemlianukhin (from (Kazakhstan) Kaisar)
18	GK	CAN	Milan Borjan (from (Bulgaria) Ludogorets)
3	DF	SRB	Nikola Valentić (free, last with (Azerbaijan) Gabala)

Out: Note: Flags indicate national team as defined under FIFA eligibility rules; some limited exceptions apply. Players may hold more than one non-FIFA nationality.

No.	Pos.	Nation	Player
49	DF	SRB	Branko Pauljević (loan return to Partizan)
88	FW	ECU	Augusto Batioja (to (Czech Republic) Vysočina Jihlava)
20	MF	SWE	Petar Petrović (loan return to (Sweden) Malmö FF)
44	MF	KAZ	Baurzhan Turysbek (to (Kazakhstan) Zhetysu)
30	FW	SRB	Bratislav Punoševac (to (Hungary) Honvéd)
91	FW	SRB	Vladimir Đilas (to (Greece) Ergotelis)
4	DF	MKD	Vlade Lazarevski (released)
—	GK	SRB	Dimitrije Radojković (to (Slovenia) NŠ Mura)
—	FW	SRB	Stefan Vukić (on loan to Car Konstantin, was on loan at Sinđelić Niš)
—	GK	SRB	Miloš Perić (on loan to Radnički Pirot, was on loan at Radnik Surdulica)
18	MF	SRB	Nikola Mladenović (to Jedinstvo Putevi)
—	DF	SRB	Aleksandar Mršević (on loan to Sinđelić Niš, previously brought from Partizan youth)
—	FW	SRB	Nikola Petković (on loan to Sinđelić Niš)

=== Radnički 1923 ===
In: Note: Flags indicate national team as defined under FIFA eligibility rules; some limited exceptions apply. Players may hold more than one non-FIFA nationality.

No.	Pos.	Nation	Player
21	MF	SRB	Aleksandar Keljević (loan return from Pobeda Beloševac)
41	DF	SRB	Bojan Miljuš (loan return from Pobeda Beloševac)
43	DF	SRB	Ivan Živanović (loan return from Pobeda Beloševac)
47	FW	SRB	Lazar Popović (loan return from Pobeda Beloševac)

Out: Note: Flags indicate national team as defined under FIFA eligibility rules; some limited exceptions apply. Players may hold more than one non-FIFA nationality.

No.	Pos.	Nation	Player
3	DF	SRB	Darko Fejsa (released)
14	DF	SRB	Marko Đorđević (to (New Zealand) Auckland City)
29	MF	SRB	Marko Perović (to (Malaysia) Sime Darby)
10	MF	SRB	Lazar Arsić (to (Greece) Apollon Smyrnis)
61	MF	SRB	Milan Ćulum (to Radnički Niš)
28	DF	GHA	Joseph Cudjoe (loan return to Radnik Surdulica)
99	FW	SLO	David Poljanec (to (Austria) Kapfenberger SV)
26	MF	SRB	Nemanja Vidić (released)
30	DF	SRB	Miloš Rnić (released)
46	FW	SRB	Vuk Sotirović (to Novi Pazar)
2	DF	SRB	Jovan Krneta (to (Ukraine) Chornomorets Odesa)
6	MF	SRB	Aleksandar Janković (released)
—	DF	SRB	Lazar Petrović (on loan to Sloga PM, was on loan at Pobeda Beloševac)
11	MF	SRB	Stevan Živković (to Metalac GM)
18	FW	SRB	Stefan Stojanović (was on loan, now signed with Radnički Svilajnac)
—	DF	GHA	Karim Alhassan (to (Ghana) Liberty Professionals)

== See also ==
- Serbian SuperLiga
- 2014–15 Serbian SuperLiga
