= Biševac =

Biševac is a surname. Notable people with the surname include:

- Denis Biševac (born 1996), Serbian footballer
- Milan Biševac (born 1983), Serbian footballer
