= Uroš Mirković =

Uroš Mirković may refer to:

- Uroš Mirković (footballer), Serbian association football midfielder
- Uroš Mirković (basketball), Serbian professional basketball player
