= Punoševac =

Punoševac (Serbian Cyrillic: Пунoшeвaц) is a Serbian surname. Notable people with the surname include:

- Dušan Punoševac (born 1991), Serbian footballer
- Bratislav Punoševac (born 1987), Serbian footballer
