= Jovan Lučić =

Canadian-Serbian footballer

Personal information
- Date of birth: 26 May 1987 (age 39)
- Place of birth: Vancouver, British Columbia, Canada
- Height: 1.89 m (6 ft 2 in)
- Position: Goalkeeper

Team information
- Current team: Budućnost Dobanovci
- Number: 12

Senior career*
Years	Team	Apps	(Gls)
2004–2009	Serbian White Eagles	110	(0)
2009–2010	Vancouver Olympics	22	(0)
2010–2013	Serbian White Eagles	74	(0)
2014	Gorno Lisiče	2	(0)
2014–2015	Rad	0	(0)
2015	→ Hajduk Beograd (loan)	1	(0)
2015	→ BSK Batajnica (loan)	3	(0)
2016	Vršac	14	(0)
2016	Bežanija	1	(0)
2017	Radnički Beograd	7	(0)
2018	Brodarac	15	(0)
2018	Smederevo	15	(0)
2019	Zvezdara	9	(0)
2019	Botev Vratsa	0	(0)
2020	Arda Kardzhali	0	(0)
2020–2021	Budućnost Dobanovci	1	(0)
2020	→ GSP Polet Dorćol (loan)	12	(0)
2021	Rad	1	(0)
2022–	Budućnost Dobanovci	10	(0)
- * Club domestic league appearances and goals as of 15 October 2022

Jovan Lučić (born 26 May 1987) is a football goalkeeper, holding both Canadian and Serbian citizenship, who plays for Budućnost Dobanovci.

== Career ==
Born in Vancouver, he played with the Serbian White Eagles in Vancouver.

During the second half of the 2013–14 season he played with Gorno Lisiče in the Macedonian First League.

In summer 2014 he joined Serbian SuperLiga side FK Rad, and during the winter break of the 2014–15 season he was loaned to FK Hajduk Beograd.

In winter 2016 he joined Vršac, played 14 games and saved the club from relegation. In summer 2016 he joined Serbian First League side Bežanija,

In winter 2017 he joined Radnički Beograd, and won the 2017 Belgrade Football Association Cup which was decided on penalties, and Lučić was decisive by stopping two, and subsequently was named the Man of the Match.

== Personal life ==
Lučić's father, Dobrivoje, had been a soccer player in Yugoslavia, and his brother is NHL ice hockey player Milan Lucic.

== Honours ==
Radnički Beograd

- Belgrade FA Cup: 2016–17

== Ice hockey ==
Jovan Lucic
- Born: May 26, 1987 (age 39) Vancouver, British Columbia
- Position: Defence
- Shot: Right
- SHL team: HK Beostar
- Playing career: 2006–2015

Lučić played Ice Hockey as well. He played for Burnaby based club White Eagles in the Adult Safe Hockey League. Lučić has played as a professional in the Serbian Hockey League, 2013 to 2015 for HK Beostar during his football winter breaks.
