= Mitar Pejović =

Serbian footballer

Personal information
- Full name: Mitar Pejović
- Date of birth: 1 November 1983 (age 43)
- Place of birth: Bor, SFR Yugoslavia
- Height: 1.93 m (6 ft 4 in)
- Position: Goalkeeper

Senior career*
Years	Team	Apps	(Gls)
2001–2002	Zvezdara	3	(0)
2002–2003	Srem	18	(0)
2003–2005	Voždovac	68	(0)
2005–2007	Srem	14	(0)
2007–2008	INON Požarevac	16	(0)
2008–2012	Mladi Radnik	105	(0)
2012–2015	Metalac Gornji Milanovac	31	(0)
2015–2017	Mačva Šabac	54	(0)
Total		309	(0)
- * Club domestic league appearances and goals as of 25 June 2017

Mitar Pejović (Serbian Cyrillic: Митар Пејовић; born 1 November 1983) is a Serbian football goalkeeper who last played for Mačva Šabac.
