= Stefan Nedović =

Serbian footballer

Personal information
- Date of birth: 12 January 1988 (age 38)
- Place of birth: Kragujevac, SFR Yugoslavia
- Height: 1.83 m (6 ft 0 in)
- Position: Defensive midfielder

Team information
- Current team: Šumadija 1903

Senior career*
Years	Team	Apps	(Gls)
2006–2014	Radnički Kragujevac	130	(3)
2008–2009	→ Šumadija 1903 (loan)		
2015	Radnik Surdulica	15	(0)
2015–2017	Jagodina	39	(0)
2017	Šumadija 1903	7	(0)
2017	Radnički Kragujevac	13	(0)
2018-2019	Sloga Požega		
2019	Sušica 1929 Kragujevac		
2020	Smederevo	5	(0)
2020	Radnički Svilajnac		
2021-2022	Sušica 1929 Kragujevac		
2022-2023	Zastava 1973		
2023-	Šumadija 1903		
- * Club domestic league appearances and goals as of 31 December 2017

Stefan Nedović (Serbian Cyrillic: Стефан Недовић; born 12 January 1988) is a Serbian footballer, who plays for Šumadija 1903 and had a lengthy spell with Radnički Kragujevac.

== Honours ==
Radnik Surdulica

- Serbian First League: 2014–15
