= FK Palilulac Niš =

Serbian football club

Palilulac Niš
- Full name: Fudbalski Klub Palilulac
- Founded: 1952; 74 years ago
- Ground: Stadion Delijski Vis, Niš
- League: Zone League Centre
- 2024–25: Zone League Centre, 4th of 12
Home colours	Away colours

FK Palilulac Niš (Serbian Cyrillic: ФК Палилулац Ниш) is a football club based in Niš, Serbia. They compete in the Zone League Centre, the fourth tier of the national league system.

== History ==
The club won the Niš First League in the 2021–22 season and got promoted to the Zone League Centre, the fourth tier of Serbian football. They marked their 70th anniversary in November 2022.

=== Recent league history ===
Season	Division	P	W	D	L	F	A	Pts	Pos
2020–21	5 - Niš First League	26	15	4	7	57	29	49	2nd
2021–22	5 - Niš First League	24	21	2	1	71	14	65	1st
2022–23	4 - Zone League Centre	30	11	8	11	39	50	41	9th
2023–24	4 - Zone League Centre	30	13	3	14	50	51	41	11th
2024–25	4 - Zone League Centre	26	7	6	13	32	63	27	4th

== Honours ==
Niš First League (Tier 5)

- 2010–11, 2021–22

Niš Second League (Tier 6)

- 2013–14
