= Jovica Blagojević =

Serbian footballer

Personal information
- Full name: Jovica Blagojević
- Date of birth: 27 August 1998 (age 28)
- Place of birth: Kragujevac, FR Yugoslavia
- Height: 1.74 m (5 ft 9 in)
- Position: Left wing-back

Team information
- Current team: Radnički Svilajnac

Youth career
- –2014: Jagodina
- 2014–2015: Rad
- 2015–2017: Voždovac

Senior career*
| Years | Team | Apps | (Gls) |
| 2015–2019 | Voždovac | 19 | (0) |
| 2018 | → Radnički Obrenovac (loan) | 11 | (2) |
| 2019 | → Sinđelić Beograd (loan) | 6 | (0) |
| 2019–2020 | Kom | 15 | (0) |
| 2020 | Radnički Obrenovac | | |
| 2021 | Jagodina | 17 | (0) |
| 2021-2022 | Radnički Svilajnac | | |
| 2022 | FK 1.Maj Ruma | | |
| 2022- | Radnički Svilajnac | | |

International career
| 2013 | Serbia U16 | | |
| 2014–2015 | Serbia U17 | | |
| 2016–2017 | Serbia U19 | 6 | (0) |
- * Club domestic league appearances and goals as of 10 November 2019

Jovica Blagojević (Serbian Cyrillic: Јовица Благојевић; born 27 August 1998) is a Serbian footballer playing for Radnički Svilajnac.

== Career ==
=== Youth ===
During the 2013, as a member of FK Jagodina Blagojević was called to Serbia U16 national team selection, and played some friendly matches. He stayed with Jagodina until 2014. Later, from 2014 to 2015, he was with cadet team of FK Rad and Serbia U17. In 2015, Blagojević joined youth team of FK Voždovac.

=== Voždovac ===
Blagojević made his debut for the first team in the 20th fixture of 2015–16 season, played on 5 December 2015, against Radnički Niš and became the youngest player of FK Voždovac who made appearance in the Serbian SuperLiga. Ending of 2015, Blagojević signed his first professional contract with FK Voždovac, until 2019.

On 25 January 2019, Blagojević was loaned out to FK Sinđelić Beograd for the rest of the season.

=== Return to Radnički Obrenovac ===
In January 2020, Blagojević returned to FK Radnički Obrenovac, the club he played for on loan in 2018.

== Career statistics ==
As of 21 December 2016

| Club | Season | League | | | Cup | | Continental | | Other | | Total | |
| Club | Season | Division | Apps | Goals | Apps | Goals | Apps | Goals | Apps | Goals | Apps | Goals |
|---|---|---|---|---|---|---|---|---|---|---|---|---|
| Voždovac | 2015–16 | Serbian SuperLiga | 6 | 0 | 0 | 0 | – | – | – | – | 6 | 0 |
| Voždovac | 2016–17 | Serbian SuperLiga | 10 | 0 | 0 | 0 | – | – | – | – | 10 | 0 |
| Voždovac | Total | | 16 | 0 | 0 | 0 | – | – | – | – | 16 | 0 |
