= Dušan Tešić =

Serbian footballer

Personal information
- Full name: Dušan Tešić
- Date of birth: 16 July 1988 (age 38)
- Place of birth: Belgrade, SFR Yugoslavia
- Height: 1.74 m (5 ft 9 in)
- Positions: Right wing; right-back

Senior career*
Years	Team	Apps	(Gls)
2005–2008	Mladenovac	32	(0)
2008–2009	Šumadija Jagnjilo	25	(6)
2009–2011	Zemun	51	(3)
2011	Šumadija Jagnjilo	12	(0)
2012–2013	Mladenovac	42	(4)
2013–2015	Mladost Lučani	50	(7)
2015	Spartak Subotica	2	(0)
2016	Sopot		
2016-2019	Pajde Möhlin		
2019-2020	1. FC Südring Aschaffenburg	12	(3)
2021-2023	Mladenovac		
- * Club domestic league appearances and goals as of 19 December 2015

Dušan Tešić (Serbian Cyrillic: Душан Тешић; born 16 July 1988) is a Serbian retired football forward, who has played for Spartak Subotica in the Serbian SuperLiga.

== Honours ==
Mladost

- Serbian First League: 2013–14
