= Richard Falcão =

Brazilian footballer (born 1987)

Personal information
- Full name: Richard Amorim Falcão
- Date of birth: 29 June 1987 (age 39)
- Place of birth: Feira de Santana, Brazil
- Height: 1.86 m (6 ft 1 in)
- Position: Forward

Team information
- Current team: Real Noroeste

Youth career
- 2002–2006: Botafogo

Senior career*
Years	Team	Apps	(Gls)
2006	Botafogo	0	(0)
2007	America RJ	0	(0)
2007	Paraíba do Sul	0	(0)
2008	Colatinense	9	(5)
2009	Buriram United	1	(0)
2010	Guarani	3	(2)
2010–2011	Ponte Preta	9	(0)
2011	Veranópolis	3	(1)
2012	Itabuna	2	(0)
2012	América PE	5	(0)
2012	Rio Claro	6	(3)
2012	Villa Nova	0	(0)
2012–2013	SE Patrocinense		
2013	Ipatinga	2	(0)
2013	Betim	2	(0)
2013	Comercial	4	(0)
2013	Amadense	0	(0)
2014	Galícia	12	(2)
2014	Jacobina	0	(0)
2015	Novi Pazar	3	(0)
2016	Jacuipense		
2016	Juazeirense	2	(0)
2016	Atlético Itapemirim		
2017	Vitória das Tabocas		
2017–	Real Noroeste		
- * Club domestic league appearances and goals as of 19 June 2016

Richard Amorim Falcão (born 29 June 1987), sometimes known as Rei, is a Brazilian professional footballer who plays as a forward for Real Noroeste.

== Career ==
=== Early career ===
Born on 29 June 1987, in Feira de Santana, he played with Botafogo, America RJ, Paraíba do Sul and Colatinense.

=== Thailand ===
In 2009, he moved to Thailand and played with top-league side Buriram United, at time known as Provincial Electricity Authority FC which had just been Thai Premier League champions the season earlier, 2008.

=== Back in Brazil ===
After returning from Niger, on 3 January 2010, he signed with Guarani (Campeonato Paulista A2), Then he joined Ponte Preta and played in the Campeonato Brasileiro Serie B but he disappointed after missing a goal in an important match against Nautico and ended up leaving in March 2011. He then played with Veranópolis in the Campeonato Gaucho. On 3 January 2012, he signed with Itabuna and played in the Campeonato Baiano. Later he played with América PE (Campeonato Pernambucano), Rio Claro (Campeonato Paulista A2), Villa Nova, Esportiva Patrocinense and Ipatinga (Campeonato Brasileiro Serie C), In July 2013, he signed with Comercial after a brief spell with Betim Amadense, Galícia (Campeonato Baiano) and Jacobina were his last clubs before his move to Europe.

=== Serbia ===
In the winter break of the 2014–15 Serbian SuperLiga season, he joined FK Novi Pazar.

He left Serbia at the end of the first half of the season, and during winter-break he returned to Brazil. He joined Jacuipense but stayed only during the month of January, afterwards moving to Juazeirense. Next he played with Atlético Itapemirim, Vitória das Tabocas and Real Noroeste.

== Honours ==
Campinas

- Campeonato Brasileiro Serie B: 2008
