= Predrag Đorđević (footballer, born 1990) =

Serbian footballer

Personal information
- Full name: Predrag Đorđević
- Date of birth: 30 June 1990 (age 36)
- Place of birth: Leskovac, SFR Yugoslavia
- Height: 1.83 m (6 ft 0 in)
- Position: Right-back

Team information
- Current team: Dubočica
- Number: 2

Senior career*
Years	Team	Apps	(Gls)
2008–2010	Dubočica		
2010–2012	Jagodina	15	(0)
2011	→ Ararat Yerevan (loan)	1	(0)
2011–2012	→ Sinđelić Niš (loan)	28	(8)
2012–2014	Javor Ivanjica	46	(2)
2014	Red Star Belgrade	0	(0)
2015	Mladost Lučani	5	(0)
2015	Radnik Surdulica	8	(1)
2016	Jagodina	24	(0)
2017	OFK Beograd	10	(0)
2017–2018	Novi Pazar	26	(3)
2018–2022	Radnik Surdulica	78	(1)
2022–	Dubočica		
- * Club domestic league appearances and goals as of 9 November 2022

Predrag Đorđević (Serbian Cyrillic: Предраг Ђорђевић; born 30 June 1990) is a Serbian professional footballer who plays as a defender for Dubočica.

== Club career ==
After playing with Dubočica in the Serbian League East, Đorđević moved to SuperLiga club Jagodina in the summer of 2010. He was loaned to First League club Sinđelić Niš in the 2011–12 season, making 28 appearances and scoring eight goals. In August 2012, Đorđević was transferred to Javor Ivanjica. He immediately became a first team regular, establishing himself as one of the best right-backs in the league. Đorđević made 46 league appearances and scored two goals in his two seasons at the club.
