= José Mina =

Ecuadorian footballer (born 1993)

Personal information
- Full name: José Jackson Mina Borja
- Date of birth: 4 March 1993 (age 33)
- Place of birth: Esmeraldas, Ecuador
- Height: 1.85 m (6 ft 1 in)
- Position: Defensive midfielder

Team information
- Current team: Unión Huaral
- Number: 6

Youth career
- 2008–2009: Barcelona S.C.
- 2009: Norte América
- 2009–2010: Independiente del Valle
- 2010: Norte América
- 2010: Municipal Cañar
- 2010–2011: Independiente del Valle
- 2011–2012: Norte América

Senior career*
| Years | Team | Apps | (Gls) |
| 2012–2013 | El Nacional II | 4 | (0) |
| 2013 | Un. Católica del Ecuador II | 31 | (2) |
| 2014 | El Nacional | 6 | (0) |
| 2014 | → El Nacional II | 4 | (1) |
| 2015 | Novi Pazar | 2 | (0) |
| 2015–2016 | Plaza Colonia | | |
| 2016 | Guayaquil SC | | |
| 2017 | Atlético Samborondón | | |
| 2017–2018 | Duros del Balón | | |
| 2018–2019 | Anaconda | | |
| 2019 | Santa Rita | | |
| 2020 | Olmedo | 2 | (0) |
| 2020–2021 | Santa Rita | | |
| 2021– | Unión Huaral | 15 | (0) |
- * Club domestic league appearances and goals as of 30 September 2021

José Jackson Mina Borja (born 4 March 1993) is an Ecuadorian football midfielder who plays for Peruvian club Unión Huaral.

== Career ==
Mina was with Barcelona SC U20 team until 2009. Same year, he played for CS Norte América. Then, from 2009 to 2010 Independiente del Valle U20 team, and later in 2010 for CD Municipal Cañar U20, and CS Norte América, again. From 2010 to 2011, he was with Independiente del Valle U20 for the second time, and from 2011 to 2012 he returned in CS Norte América the third time. He played for B team of CD El Nacional from 2013 to 2014, and B team of CD Universidad Católica from 2013 to 2014. In 2014, he made 6 appearances for CD El Nacional.

In winter break off-season 2014–15, he arrived in Novi Pazar, together with José Gutiérrez.

After playing half-season in Serbia, in summer 2015 he moved to Uruguay and played one season with Plaza Colonia in the 2015–16 Uruguayan Primera División season. Following summer he returned to Ecuador and joined Guayaquil S.C.
