= Milan Jokić =

Serbian footballer

Personal information
- Full name: Milan Jokić
- Date of birth: 21 March 1995 (age 31)
- Place of birth: Aranđelovac, FR Yugoslavia
- Height: 1.79 m (5 ft 10 in)
- Position: Midfielder

Team information
- Current team: Zemun
- Number: 23

Youth career
- Partizan

Senior career*
Years	Team	Apps	(Gls)
2013–2014	Red Star Belgrade	0	(0)
2014	→ BSK Borča (loan)	12	(0)
2014	→ Kolubara (loan)	12	(0)
2015	Voždovac	9	(0)
2015	Borac Čačak	2	(0)
2015–2016	Spartak Subotica	7	(0)
2016–2017	BSK Borča	25	(3)
2017–2018	Bežanija	11	(1)
2018–2019	Zlatibor Čajetina	34	(4)
2019–2021	Metalac Gornji Milanovac	57	(3)
2021	Tsarsko Selo	13	(0)
2022	Novi Pazar	14	(1)
2022	Sūduva	16	(0)
2023	Novi Sad 1921	16	(1)
2023–2025	Mladost Novi Sad	66	(9)
2025–	Zemun	28	(3)

International career
2011–2012	Serbia U17	5	(2)
2014	Serbia U19	2	(0)
- * Club domestic league appearances and goals as of 14 May 2026

Milan Jokić (Serbian Cyrillic: Милан Јокић; born 21 March 1995) is a Serbian professional footballer who plays as a midfielder for Zemun.

== Career ==
He joined Red Star Belgrade from the Partizan youth categories before the 2013–14 season. He was loaned to BSK Borča and Kolubara, but he didn't play official match for Red Star Belgrade. He broke the contract and in winter break off-season 2014–15 moved to Voždovac.

In July 2022 he signed with Lithuanian club FK Sūduva.
