= Nikola Popara =

Bosnian professional footballer (born 1992)

Personal information
- Date of birth: 8 March 1992 (age 34)
- Place of birth: Trebinje, SFR Yugoslavia
- Height: 1.80 m (5 ft 11 in)
- Position: Defensive midfielder

Team information
- Current team: Sloga Meridian
- Number: 7

Youth career
- 2002–2009: Partizan

Senior career*
| Years | Team | Apps | (Gls) |
| 2009–2012 | Teleoptik | 77 | (1) |
| 2012–2014 | Spartak Subotica | 26 | (0) |
| 2014–2015 | Vojvodina | 8 | (1) |
| 2015 | Jagodina | 11 | (0) |
| 2015–2016 | Biel-Bienne | 22 | (0) |
| 2016 | United Zürich | 6 | (0) |
| 2017 | Nyon | 9 | (1) |
| 2017–2018 | Budućnost Podgorica | 13 | (0) |
| 2018–2022 | Radnik Bijeljina | 81 | (3) |
| 2022– | Sloga Meridian | 30 | (0) |

International career
| 2008–2009 | Bosnia and Herzegovina U17 | 3 | (0) |
| 2009–2010 | Bosnia and Herzegovina U19 | 9 | (0) |
- * Club domestic league appearances and goals as of 1 May 2023

Nikola Popara (Serbian Cyrillic: Никола Попара; born 8 March 1992) is a Bosnian professional footballer who plays as a defensive midfielder for Bosnian Premier League club Sloga Meridian.

== Honours ==
Vojvodina

- Serbian Cup: 2013–14

Radnik Bijeljina

- Republika Srpska Cup: 2018–19
