= Aleksandar Mršević =

Serbian footballer

Personal information
- Full name: Aleksandar Mršević
- Date of birth: 25 July 1996 (age 30)
- Place of birth: Niš, FR Yugoslavia
- Height: 1.84 m (6 ft 0 in)
- Position: Defender

Team information
- Current team: Jedinstvo Gornji Matejevac

Youth career
- Partizan

Senior career*
Years	Team	Apps	(Gls)
2014–2016	Radnički Niš	1	(0)
2014-2015	→ Sinđelić Niš (loan)		
2015	→ Timočanin (loan)		
2016-2017	Zlatibor Čajetina		
2017-2018	Sinđelić Niš		
2018	Zaplanjac		
2019	Moravac Mrštane		
2020-2021	Timočanin		
2021-2023	Sinđelić Niš		
2023-	Jedinstvo Gornji Matejevac		

International career
2011	Serbia U15		
- * Club domestic league appearances and goals as of 8 November 2015

Aleksandar Mršević (Serbian Cyrillic: Александар Мршевић; born 25 July 1996) is a Serbian football defender. His primary position is centre-back, but he also can perform as a full-back.

== Career ==
Mršević passed the youth school of FK Partizan. He joined Radnički Niš in 2014, but 2014–15 season he spent as a loaned player in Sinđelić Niš. He made his SuperLiga in away win against OFK Beograd in 17th fixture of 2015–16 Serbian SuperLiga season, when he started match as a right-back, but he made a penalty on the opponent player and got the yellow card, so he was substituted out at the beginning of second half.
