= Miloš Crnomarković =

Serbian footballer

Personal information
- Full name: Miloš Crnomarković
- Date of birth: 15 September 1993 (age 33)
- Place of birth: Pančevo, FR Yugoslavia
- Height: 1.86 m (6 ft 1 in)
- Position: Left-back

Team information
- Current team: ASKÖ Doppl-Hart 74
- Number: 33

Youth career
- –2011: Beograd

Senior career*
Years	Team	Apps	(Gls)
2011–2012	Sinđelić Beograd	30	(4)
2013	Timok	22	(4)
2014–2015	Mladost Lučani	17	(1)
2015	→ Sloboda Užice (loan)	7	(1)
2015	BSK Borča	5	(0)
2016	Sinđelić Beograd	5	(0)
2016–2017	Železničar Pančevo		
2017	Jedinstvo Bihać	8	(0)
2018–2019	Sloboda Mrkonjić Grad	34	(3)
2020	Orašje		
2020-2021	Dinamo Pančevo		
2021-2022	Mladost Omoljica		
2022	Union Babenberg Linz Süd	11	(5)
2023-	ASKÖ Doppl-Hart 74	29	(5)

International career
2010–2012	Serbia U18	6	(0)
- * Club domestic league appearances and goals as of 31 May 2024

Miloš Crnomarković (Serbian Cyrillic: Милош Црномарковић; born 15 September 1993) is a Serbian professional footballer who plays as a left-back for Austrian lower league side ASKÖ Doppl-Hart 74.

Crnomarković has also played for First League of FBiH club Orašje.

== Honours ==
Mladost Lučani

- Serbian First League: 2013–14
