= Nenad Kočović =

Serbian footballer

Personal information
- Date of birth: 20 February 1995 (age 31)
- Place of birth: Kragujevac, FR Yugoslavia
- Height: 1.83 m (6 ft 0 in)
- Position: Left-back

Team information
- Current team: Kabel Novi Sad
- Number: 13

Youth career
- Radnički Stobex
- Loznica
- Zemun
- Vojvodina

Senior career*
Years	Team	Apps	(Gls)
2014–2015	Vojvodina	0	(0)
2014	→ ČSK Čelarevo (loan)	14	(0)
2015–2016	Proleter Novi Sad	28	(2)
2016–2017	Borac Čačak	5	(0)
2017–2018	Loznica	15	(1)
2018–2019	Proleter Novi Sad	11	(0)
2019	Inđija	1	(0)
2019–2021	Kabel	58	(1)
2021–2024	Kolubara	97	(2)
2024–2025	Mladost Novi Sad	33	(0)
2025–	Kabel Novi Sad	31	(0)
- * Club domestic league appearances and goals as of 14 May 2026

Nenad Kočović (Serbian Cyrillic: Ненад Кочовић; born 20 February 1995) is a Serbian professional footballer who plays as a defender for Kabel Novi Sad.

== Club career ==
Born in Kragujevac, Kočović had played for several clubs during his youth career before he joined Vojvodina, where he spent the rest of youth career. He was licensed for the first team of the club in summer 2014, and was sitting on the bench in the 2nd leg match against Trenčín in UEFA Europa League qualifications. He was loaned to ČSK Čelarevo on dual registration for the first half-season. Later he extended his loan until the end of 2014–15 season, helping his team to make promotion in the Serbian First League. In summer 2015, Kočović terminated a contract with Vojvodina, and moved to Proleter Novi Sad for the 2015–16 Serbian First League season. Playing for Proleter, Kočović was the most standard player in squad with 28 matches scoring 2 goals, one in each half-season. During the winter break off-season, he was with Rad, but failed to sign a contract after two clubs did not make a deal. Kočović left the club after the end of season. In summer 2016, Kočović joined Serbian SuperLiga club Borac Čačak and signed contract until 2019. Making 7 appearances in all competitions, Kočović sued the club for unpaid wages in 2017, and got the contract termination to the detriment of the club and left Borac after the end of 2016–17 season.

== Career statistics ==
As of 22 June 2017

Club	Season	League			Cup		Continental		Other		Total	
Club	Season	Division	Apps	Goals	Apps	Goals	Apps	Goals	Apps	Goals	Apps	Goals
Vojvodina	2014–15	Serbian SuperLiga	0	0	0	0	0	0	—		0	0
ČSK Čelarevo (loan)	2014–15	Serbian League Vojvodina	14	0	—		—		—		14	0
Proleter Novi Sad	2015–16	Serbian First League	28	2	0	0	—		—		28	2
Borac Čačak	2016–17	Serbian SuperLiga	5	0	2	0	—		—		7	0
Career total			47	2	2	0	0	0	—		49	2

== Honours ==
Proleter Novi Sad

- Serbian First League: 2017–18
