= Miloš Antić =

Swiss businessman and footballer (born 1994)

- Born: 28 October 1994 (age 32); Zürich, Switzerland
- Occupation: Member of the Executive Board
- Organization: DHG Holding AG
- Parent: Blagoje Antić
Association football career
- Height: 1.85 m (6 ft 1 in)
- Position: Attacking midfielder
Youth career
- 2000–2012: Grasshopper
- 2012–2014: Lazio
Senior career*
Years	Team	Apps	(Gls)
2013–2014	Lazio	0	(0)
2015	OFK Beograd	11	(0)
2015–2016	Enosis Neon Paralimni	5	(0)
2016–2017	Anagennisi Deryneia	0	(0)
- * Club domestic league appearances and goals

Miloš Antić (born 28 October 1994) is a Swiss entrepreneur and former footballer. He is the son of businessman Blagoje Antić, who is the founder and chairman of DHG Holding AG.

== Childhood and youth ==
Miloš Antić was born in Zürich, Switzerland in 1994, where he grew up with three sisters. His parents fled from Gnjilane, Kosovo to Switzerland in 1990. His father Blagoje Antić is a businessman and Real Estate Tycoon, who became self-employed in 1994 and has since founded various companies in the fields of real estate, real estate development, construction and construction services and invested in real estate throughout Switzerland and Serbia. Antić attended and graduated from the MSP Private School in Zürich and the Private Business School in Rome.

== Soccer career ==
Antić joined the Grasshopper in 2000 at the age of six and went through the whole promotion camp and training programme of the youth department. During a six-month stay in London in 2011, he played for the Football Club Fulham. In 2012 Antić moved to Lazio as an offensive midfielder for Primavera (the under-19 team). He trained there regularly with the first team and has a professional contract. He became Italian champion with the U21 Primavera in 2012/13. In 2014 he terminated his contract with Lazio due to a serious knee injury and disagreements with the club management.

In the same year Antić moved to the 1st division at OFK Beograd in Serbia. Speculation that his father was acting as a financier of the club led to his contract with OFK Belgrad being terminated after only eight months due to security concerns and he left the club.

In 2015 Antić signed with the Cypriot 1st division club Enosis Neon Paralimni. After six months in Cyprus he cancelled his contract and ended his football career.

== Business career ==
In 2015, Antić joined DHG Holding AG, the family business company founded by his father, as assistant to the management. In 2018 he became a member of the Executive Board for the management and expansion of the operational business.
