= Strahinja Petrović =

Serbian footballer

Personal information
- Date of birth: 14 June 1992 (age 34)
- Place of birth: Niš, FR Yugoslavia
- Height: 1.77 m (5 ft 10 in)
- Position: Right midfielder

Team information
- Current team: Mladi Radnik

Senior career*
Years	Team	Apps	(Gls)
2010–2014	Radnički Niš	42	(5)
2011–2012	→ Balkanski (loan)	11	(2)
2014	Napredak Kruševac	3	(0)
2015	Radnički Niš	0	(0)
2015–2017	Sinđelić Niš	31	(9)
2017–2019	Car Konstantin	27	(4)
2019–2021	Radnički Pirot	48	(11)
2021	Loznica	17	(0)
2022	Timok	14	(1)
2022-2023	Dubočica		
2023-	Mladi Radnik		
- * Club domestic league appearances and goals as of 6 October 2021

Strahinja Petrović (Serbian Cyrillic: Страхиња Петровић; born 14 June 1992) is a Serbian footballer who plays for Mladi Radnik in the Serbian League.
