= Dušan Punoševac =

Serbian footballer

Personal information
- Full name: Dušan Punoševac
- Date of birth: 28 July 1991 (age 35)
- Place of birth: Kruševac, SFR Yugoslavia
- Height: 1.86 m (6 ft 1 in)
- Position: Left-back

Team information
- Current team: Trayal
- Number: 31

Youth career
- Napredak Kruševac

Senior career*
Years	Team	Apps	(Gls)
2010–2011	Napredak Kruševac	0	(0)
2011	→ Kopaonik Brus (loan)		
2011–2012	Prva Petoletka	22	(1)
2012–2013	OFK Beograd	5	(0)
2014	Sloga Petrovac na Mlavi	15	(0)
2014	Donji Srem	10	(0)
2015	Napredak Kruševac	3	(0)
2018-	Trayal Kruševac	143+	(0+)
- * Club domestic league appearances and goals as of 22 June 2015

Dušan Punoševac (Serbian Cyrillic: Душан Пуношевац; born 28 July 1991) is a Serbian professional footballer who plays as a defender for Trayal Kruševac.

== Career ==
He started his career in Napredak Kruševac, but not debut for first team. After playing for Kopaonik Brus and Prva Petoletka Trstenik, he moved to OFK Beograd. He played on 5 Jelen SuperLiga matches for OFK Beograd. In 2014, he left to Sloga Petrovac na Mlavi.
