= Dragan Karanov =

Serbian footballer

Personal information
- Full name: Dragan Karanov
- Date of birth: 10 April 1995 (age 31)
- Place of birth: Novi Sad, FR Yugoslavia
- Height: 1.79 m (5 ft 10 in)
- Position: Central midfielder

Team information
- Current team: SGM Frittlingen/Wilfingen

Senior career*
Years	Team	Apps	(Gls)
2013–2014	Proleter Novi Sad	13	(2)
2014	→ Bačka Palanka (loan)	14	(2)
2015–2016	Vojvodina	4	(0)
2015–2016	→ Proleter Novi Sad (loan)	27	(1)
2016–2017	Proleter Novi Sad	13	(0)
2017–	SGM Frittlingen/Wilfingen	23	(22)
- * Club domestic league appearances and goals as of 18 March 2017

Dragan Karanov (Serbian Cyrillic: Драган Каранов; born 10 April 1995) is a Serbian football midfielder who plays for German club Frittlingen.
