= Nikola Banjac =

Serbian footballer

Personal information
- Date of birth: 18 September 1996 (age 30)
- Place of birth: Kostolac, FR Yugoslavia
- Height: 1.88 m (6 ft 2 in)
- Position: Centre-back

Youth career
- Spartak Subotica

Senior career*
| Years | Team | Apps | (Gls) |
| 2014–2017 | Spartak Subotica | 4 | (0) |
| 2015–2016 | → Bačka 1901 (loan) | | |
| 2017 | STC Salgótarján | 16 | (0) |
| 2018 | Mórahalom | 10 | (1) |
| 2018–2019 | Pécs | 3 | (0) |

International career
| 2015 | Serbia U19 | 1 | (0) |
- * Club domestic league appearances and goals

Nikola Banjac (Serbian Cyrillic: Никола Бањац) (born 18 September 1996) is a Serbian retired footballer who played as a defender.

== Club career ==
=== Spartak Subotica ===
He made his Jelen SuperLiga debut for Spartak Subotica in a home match versus Partizan on 25 May 2014.
