= Stefan Kovačević =

Serbian footballer

Personal information
- Full name: Stefan Kovačević
- Date of birth: 2 February 1994 (age 32)
- Place of birth: Čačak, FR Yugoslavia
- Height: 1.90 m (6 ft 3 in)
- Position: Attacking midfielder

Team information
- Current team: Zadrugar Donja Trepča
- Number: 23

Youth career
- Borac Čačak

Senior career*
Years	Team	Apps	(Gls)
2011–2012	Borac Čačak	0	(0)
2011–2012	→ FK Beograd (loan)	0	(0)
2012–2013	Sloboda Čačak	26	(12)
2013–2016	OFK Beograd	3	(0)
2015	→ Sloboda Užice (loan)	6	(0)
2016	→ Bačka Palanka (loan)	3	(0)
2016–2017	Bačka Palanka	0	(0)
2017	Inđija	4	(0)
2017–2019	Borac Čačak	33	(7)
2017–2018	→ Polet Ljubić (loan)	25	(4)
2019	Žarkovo	14	(1)
2020	Borac Čačak		
2020-2021	Budućnost Arilje		
2021-2023	Jedinstvo Konjevići		
2024-	Zadrugar Donja Trepča		
- * Club domestic league appearances and goals as of 5 May 2019

Stefan Kovačević (Serbian Cyrillic: Стефан Ковачевић; born 2 February 1994) is a Serbian football midfielder who plays for Zadrugar Donja Trepča.

== Club career ==
Born in Čačak, Kovačević passed youth school of local club Borac. After spending the 2011–12 season on loan at Beograd, he moved to Sloboda Čačak for the next season, where he scored 12 goals on 26 caps in the Serbian League West. In summer 2013, Kovačević signed a professional contract with Serbian SuperLiga club OFK Beograd. During the 2013–14 season, Kovačević made 3 appearances, but missed the mostly time in 2014 because of a knee injury. For the next year, Kovačević moved to Sloboda Užice on loan. At the beginning of 2016, Kovačević moved to OFK Bačka, where he spent the spring half of 2015–16 Serbian First League season, as a loaned player. Later, in summer of the same year, he joined the club as a single player. In January 2017, Kovačević joined FK Inđija.

== Career statistics ==
As of 8 August 2019

Club	Season	League			Cup		Continental		Other		Total	
Club	Season	Division	Apps	Goals	Apps	Goals	Apps	Goals	Apps	Goals	Apps	Goals
Sloboda Čačak	2012–13	Serbian League West	26	12	—		—		—		26	12
OFK Beograd	2013–14	Serbian SuperLiga	3	0	0	0	—		—		3	0
OFK Beograd	2014–15	Serbian SuperLiga	0	0	0	0	—		—		0	0
OFK Beograd	2015–16	Serbian SuperLiga	0	0	0	0	—		—		0	0
OFK Beograd	Total		3	0	0	0	—		—		3	0
Sloboda Užice (loan)	2014–15	Serbian First League	6	0	—		—		—		6	0
OFK Bačka	2015–16 (loan)	Serbian First League	3	0	—		—		—		3	0
OFK Bačka	2016–17	Serbian SuperLiga	0	0	0	0	—		—		0	0
OFK Bačka	Total		3	0	0	0	—		—		3	0
Inđija	2016–17	Serbian First League	4	0	—		—		—		4	0
Polet Ljubić (loan)	2017–18	Serbian League West	25	4	0	0	—		—		25	4
Borac Čačak	2018–19	Serbian First League	33	7	1	0	—		—		34	7
Žarkovo	2019–20	Serbian First League	1	0	0	0	—		—		1	0
Career total			100	23	1	0	—		—		101	23
