= Davit Kokhia =

Georgian footballer

Personal information
- Full name: Davit Malhazovich Kokhia
- Date of birth: 22 April 1993 (age 33)
- Place of birth: Moscow, Russia
- Height: 1.85 m (6 ft 1 in)
- Position: Midfielder

Youth career
- 200X–200x: Spartak Moscow–2
- 2008: KSDYUSHOR Kiyv
- 2008: Atlet Kyiv
- 2009: Smena–Obolon Kiyv
- 2010: Dynamo Kyiv

Senior career*
Years	Team	Apps	(Gls)
2011–2013	Volga Nizhny Novgorod II	59	(1)
2013–2014	Gagra	2	(0)
2014	Zaria Bălți	13	(1)
2015	Vojvodina	0	(0)
2016	Zugdidi	3	(0)
2018	Sumy	10	(0)
2019	Shevardeni-1906 Tbilisi	3	(0)

International career
2012	Georgia U21	1	(0)
- * Club domestic league appearances and goals

Davit Kokhia (born 22 April 1993) is a Georgian former footballer who played as a midfielder.

== Club career ==
Born in Moscow, Kokhia started playing for FC Spartak Moscow's youth team. In 2008, he moved to Ukraine, where he continued his youth career with KSDYUSHOR Kiyv and Atlet Kyiv. In 2009, he played for Smena–Obolon Kiyv before joining FC Dynamo Kyiv Reserves and Youth Team in 2010.

He played at the youth level for FC Dynamo Kyiv until January 2011, when he moved to Russia and joined FC Volga Nizhny Novgorod. In the 2011 and 2012 season, he played for Volga in the Russian Youth/Reserves Championship. He made 25 appearances and scored one goal in the 2011 season, 7 appearances with no goals in the 2012 season, and 27 appearances with no goals in 2012–13. In the 2013–14 season, he played for FC Gagra in the Georgian Premier League. In summer 2014, he moved to FC Zaria Bălți and played in the Moldovan National Division.

On 13 February 2015, after passing trials, he signed a year and a half contract with Serbian side FK Vojvodina. However, after not playing a single official game for the club, the contract with Vojvodina was mutually terminated after just six months.

In summer 2016, he returned to Georgia and signed with FC Zugdidi.

== International career ==
In 2012, he was part of the Georgian U19 team, and that same year he made his debut for the Georgian U21 team and continued as part of the U21 team in 2013. However, for the official UEFA matches, he made only one appearance for the Georgian U21 team.
