= Stefan Dimić =

Serbian footballer (born 1993)

Personal information
- Date of birth: 1 May 1993 (age 33)
- Place of birth: Istok, FR Yugoslavia
- Height: 1.84 m (6 ft 0 in)
- Position: Winger

Team information
- Current team: GSP Polet Dorćol

Youth career
- Partizan
- Rad

Senior career*
Years	Team	Apps	(Gls)
2011–2013	Rad	0	(0)
2011–2012	→ Palić (loan)	20	(3)
2014–2016	Čukarički	8	(1)
2015–2016	→ Sinđelić Beograd (loan)	26	(6)
2016–2018	Zemun	35	(11)
2018–2019	Mladost Lučani	31	(4)
2019–2021	Balzan	27	(2)
2021–2022	Novi Pazar	31	(6)
2022	Radnički Niš	15	(2)
2023	Telavi	5	(0)
2024	Novi Pazar	6	(0)
2024–2025	Voždovac	9	(0)
2025	Ravna Gora		
2025–2026	Dinamo Jug	5	(0)
2026–	GSP Polet Dorćol	0	(0)

International career^{‡}
2011–2012	Serbia U19	9	(0)
- * Club domestic league appearances and goals as of 15 March 2026 ‡ National team caps and goals as of 6 April 2014

Stefan Dimić (Serbian Cyrillic: Стефан Димић; born 1 May 1993) is a Serbian professional footballer who plays as a midfielder for Serbian League Belgrade club GSP Polet Dorćol.

== Club career ==
Dimić his started with Rad, but after he was loaned to Palić, he did not make any official appearance for Rad. Later he terminated the contract, and moved to Čukarički as a free agent at the beginning of 2014. Next he spent a period as a loaned player at Sinđelić Beograd, Dimić signed with Zemun in summer 2016.
