= FK Morava Ribare =

Morava Ribare
- Full name: Fudbalski Klub Morava
- Founded: 1926; 100 years ago
- Capacity: 3,000
- League: Intermunicipal League North
- 2024-25: Intermunicipal League North, 5th
Home colours	Away colours

FK Morava is a Serbian football club based in Ribare, Serbia. They compete in the Intermunicipal League North, the 6th tier of the Serbian football pyramid.

== History ==
=== Recent league history ===
Season	Division	P	W	D	L	F	A	Pts	Pos
2020–21	5 - Pomoravlje District League	32	9	5	18	39	57	32	16th
2021–22	6 - Intermunicipal League North	28	10	5	13	41	46	35	8th
2022–23	6 - Intermunicipal League North	24	11	4	9	59	54	37	5th
2023–24	5 - Pomoravlje District League	34	14	1	19	68	85	40 (Note: The club was docked three points.)	14th
2024–25	6 - Intermunicipal League North	30	17	4	9	70	53	55	5th
