= Zoran Švonja =

Serbian footballer

Personal information
- Date of birth: 4 October 1996 (age 30)
- Place of birth: Novi Sad, FR Yugoslavia
- Height: 1.88 m (6 ft 2 in)
- Position: Defensive midfielder

Team information
- Current team: Naftagas Elemir

Youth career
- Veternik
- Vojvodina
- ČSK Čelarevo
- Parma

Senior career*
Years	Team	Apps	(Gls)
2010–2013	ČSK Čelarevo	30	(1)
2013–2015	Parma	0	(0)
2014	→ Salernitana 1919 (loan)	1	(0)
2015	→ Donji Srem (loan)	8	(0)
2015–2016	Javor Ivanjica	22	(0)
2016–2018	OFK Bačka	46	(1)
2018–2019	Lokomotiv Sofia	23	(0)
2020	Javor Ivanjica	3	(0)
2020–2022	Mladost Novi Sad	7	(0)
2022	Radnički Sombor		
2023-	Naftagas Elemir		
- * Club domestic league appearances and goals as of 6 October 2021

Zoran Švonja (Serbian Cyrillic: Зоран Швоња; born 4 October 1996) is a Serbian footballer who plays as a midfielder for Naftagas Elemir. He is the younger brother of footballer Goran Švonja.

== Club career ==
From 2016 to 2018, he played for OFK Bačka.
