= Miloš Marković (footballer, born 1986) =

Serbian footballer

Personal information
- Full name: Miloš Marković
- Date of birth: 10 December 1986 (age 39)
- Place of birth: Belgrade, SR Serbia, SFR Yugoslavia
- Height: 1.80 m (5 ft 11 in)
- Position: Right-back

Team information
- Current team: Rad
- Number: 7

Senior career*
Years	Team	Apps	(Gls)
2004–2008	IMT		
2009–2011	Bežanija	74	(2)
2011–2012	Novi Pazar	15	(0)
2012	Mladost Lučani	1	(0)
2013	Novi Pazar	17	(0)
2014	Borac Banja Luka	2	(1)
2014	Rad	12	(0)
2015	Ceahlăul	15	(1)
2015–2016	Radnik Surdulica	28	(0)
2016	Rad	1	(0)
2017–2018	Borac Čačak	24	(0)
2018–2019	Rad	8	(0)
2019	Dinamo Vranje	2	(0)
2020	Brodarac		
2021	Mihajlovac		
2021	Sloga 33		
2022	Kaluđerica		
2022	Obilić Zmajevo		
2023	Borac Starčevo		
2023	Hajduk Beška		
2025–	Rad	25	(4)
- * Club domestic league appearances and goals as of 15 July 2026

Miloš Marković (Serbian Cyrillic: Милош Марковић; born 10 December 1986) is a Serbian footballer who plays as a defender for Rad.

== Career ==
After starting out at IMT, Marković joined Serbian First League club Bežanija in early 2009. He signed with Serbian SuperLiga newcomers Novi Pazar in the summer of 2011.

In early 2013, Marković rejoined Novi Pazar from Mladost Lučani. He subsequently moved to Bosnian club Borac Banja Luka in the 2014 winter transfer window. In early 2015, Marković signed with Romanian side Ceahlăul Piatra Neamț.

Following the end of the COVID-19 pandemic lockdown, Marković went on to play for a number of clubs in the lower leagues of Serbian football, including Mihajlovac, Kaluđerica, Obilić Zmajevo, Borac Starčevo, and Hajduk Beška.
