= Dejan Živković (footballer, born 1982) =

Serbian footballer

Personal information
- Full name: Dejan Živković
- Date of birth: 28 April 1982 (age 44)
- Place of birth: Smederevo, SFR Yugoslavia
- Height: 1.79 m (5 ft 10 in)
- Position: Midfielder

Senior career*
Years	Team	Apps	(Gls)
2001–2005	Železničar Smederevo	70	(6)
2006–2013	Smederevo	166	(16)
2013–2014	Borac Čačak	14	(2)
2015	Radnik Surdulica	14	(0)
2015–2016	Smederevo	24	(4)
2016–2017	RSK Rabrovo		
- * Club domestic league appearances and goals

Dejan Živković (Serbian Cyrillic: Дејан Живковић; born 28 April 1982) is a Serbian professional footballer who plays as a midfielder.

== Honours ==
Radnik Surdulica

- Serbian First League: 2014–15
