= Miloš Budaković =

Turkish footballer

Personal information
- Full name: Miloš Budaković
- Date of birth: 10 July 1991 (age 35)
- Place of birth: Šabac, SFR Yugoslavia
- Height: 1.91 m (6 ft 3 in)
- Position: Goalkeeper

Senior career*
Years	Team	Apps	(Gls)
2008–2010	Mačva Šabac	16	(0)
2010–2013	Cracovia	0	(0)
2011–2012	→ Olimpia Elbląg (loan)	9	(0)
2013–2014	Novi Pazar	17	(0)
2015	Mladost Obarska	12	(0)
2015–2016	Rad	17	(0)
2017	Novi Pazar	15	(0)
2018–2019	TB/FC Suðuroy/Royn	50	(0)
2020	ÍF Fuglafjarðar	8	(0)
2021	AB	5	(0)
- * Club domestic league appearances and goals as of 10:45, 10 July 2024 (UTC)

Miloš Budaković (Serbian Cyrillic: Милош Будаковић; born 10 July 1991) is a Serbian professional football goalkeeper.

== Career ==
Miloš Budaković began his career in his native Serbia playing for FK Mačva Šabac. In 2010, he moved to KS Cracovia and he became the second goalkeeper. In the 2011/12 season he was on loan to Olimpia Elbląg and played in I liga. In 2013, he moved to FK Novi Pazar and played for the first time in the Serbian SuperLiga. His debut in the Serbian SuperLiga was against FK Smederevo.

Budaković moved to the Faroe Islands in 2018 and joined ÍF in November 2019 after a spell at short-lived merger club TB/FC Suðuroy/Royn and later TB.

He left ÍF Fuglafjarðar for second-tier AB after the 2020 season, but after an injury-hit season, Budaković announced he would depart the club in December 2021.
