= José Gutiérrez (footballer, born 1993) =

Ecuadorian footballer

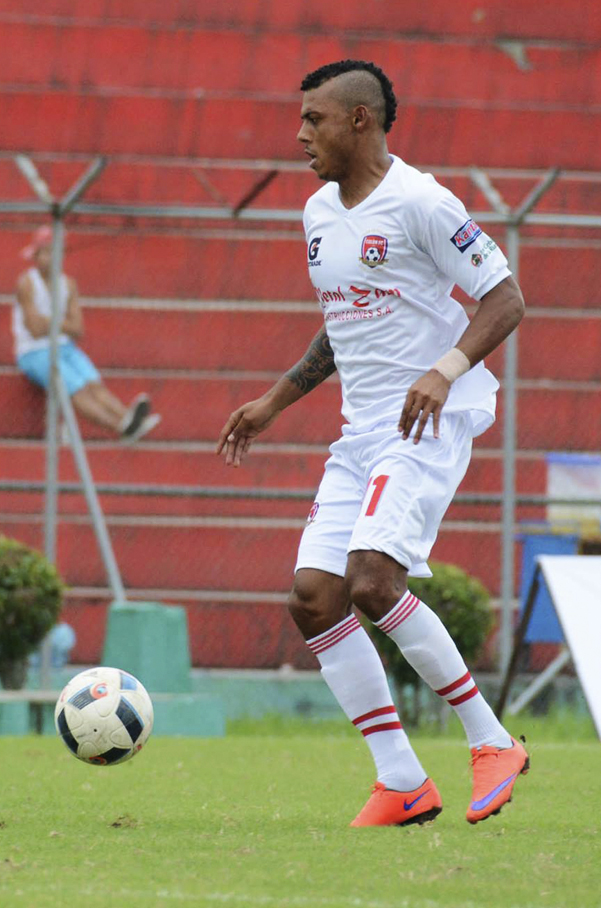

Personal information
- Full name: José Luis Gutiérrez Bastidas
- Date of birth: 3 March 1993 (age 33)
- Place of birth: Santo Domingo, Ecuador
- Position: Central midfielder

Team information
- Current team: Manta
- Number: 19

Youth career
- 2007–2009: El Nacional
- 2010: L.D.U. Quito

Senior career*
Years	Team	Apps	(Gls)
2011–2014	L.D.U. Quito	8	(0)
2013	→ L.D.U. Portoviejo (loan)	8	(5)
2015	Novi Pazar	2	(0)
2015	Deportivo Cuenca	15	(1)
2016	Colón FC	22	(2)
2017–	Manta	23	(1)

International career^{‡}
2013	Ecuador U-20	3	(1)
- * Club domestic league appearances and goals as of 26 August 2016 ‡ National team caps and goals as of 1 January 2016

José Luis Gutiérrez Bastidas (born 3 March 1993) is an Ecuadorian football midfielder who plays for Manta.

== Club career ==
He played at L.D.U. Quito and L.D.U. Portoviejo before joining FK Novi Pazar. He joined Serbian SuperLiga side FK Novi Pazar in February 2015, alongside his compatriot José Mina. However, at the end of the season he returned to Ecuador and signed with Deportivo Cuenca. After ending the year playing with Cuenca in Ecuadorian Serie A, Gutiérrez joined Colón Portoviejo playing in Ecuadorian Serie B.

== International career ==
He was part of Ecuadorian U-20 team at the 2013 South American Youth Football Championship.

== Honors ==
LDU Quito

- Copa Sudamericana: 2011 (runner-up)
