= Uroš Stamenić =

Serbian footballer

Personal information
- Date of birth: 14 October 1996 (age 30)
- Place of birth: Novi Sad, FR Yugoslavia
- Height: 1.74 m (5 ft 8 1/2 in)
- Position: Winger

Team information
- Current team: Tekstilac Odžaci
- Number: 40

Youth career
- –2014: Vojvodina

Senior career*
| Years | Team | Apps | (Gls) |
| 2014–2017 | Vojvodina | 20 | (0) |
| 2015 | → Proleter Novi Sad (loan) | 0 | (0) |
| 2016 | → Proleter Novi Sad (loan) | 12 | (2) |
| 2017–2018 | Borac Čačak | 23 | (2) |
| 2018–2019 | Proleter Novi Sad | 18 | (1) |
| 2019–2020 | Zlatibor Čajetina | 26 | (1) |
| 2021–2023 | IMT | 98 | (13) |
| 2024–2025 | AP Brera | 20 | (2) |
| 2025– | Tekstilac Odžaci | 7 | (0) |
- * Club domestic league appearances and goals as of 18 May 2025

Uroš Stamenić (Serbian Cyrillic: Урош Стаменић; born 14 October 1996) is a Serbian footballer who plays as a winger for Tekstilac Odžaci.

== Club career ==
He made his Serbian SuperLiga debut for Vojvodina on 25 May 2014 in 2:0 away win against Napredak Kruševac. After two spells he spent with Proleter Novi Sad while with his home club, Vojvodina, Stamenić permanently moved to Borac Čačak in August 2017. In June 2018, Stamenić moved back to Proleter Novi Sad as a single-player.
