= Nemanja Latinović =

Serbian footballer

Personal information
- Full name: Nemanja Latinović
- Date of birth: 21 February 1994 (age 32)
- Place of birth: Vrbas, FR Yugoslavia
- Height: 1.90 m (6 ft 3 in)
- Position: Goalkeeper

Youth career
- Hajduk Kula

Senior career*
Years	Team	Apps	(Gls)
2011–2013	Hajduk Kula	1	(0)
2013	Novi Pazar	0	(0)
2013	Bačka 1901	11	(0)
2014	Universitatea Craiova	0	(0)
2014	Bačka Palanka	0	(0)
2015	Mladost Lučani	0	(0)
2015	Srbobran		
2016	Temnić 1924	1	(0)
2017	Vrbas		
2017	Odžaci	1	(0)
2017-2018	FK Elan		

International career^{‡}
2011	Serbia U17	3	(0)
2012	Serbia U19	0	(0)
- * Club domestic league appearances and goals as of 19 October 2018 ‡ National team caps and goals as of 4 August 2013

Nemanja Latinović (Serbian Cyrillic: Немања Латиновић; born February 21, 1994) is a Serbian retired football goalkeeper.
