= Luka Grgić =

Serbian footballer

Personal information
- Full name: Luka Grgić
- Date of birth: 7 June 1995 (age 31)
- Place of birth: Kula, FR Yugoslavia
- Height: 1.80 m (5 ft 11 in)
- Position: Striker

Team information
- Current team: FK Kabel
- Number: 9

Youth career
- Hajduk Kula
- –2014: Vojvodina

Senior career*
Years	Team	Apps	(Gls)
2014–2016	Vojvodina	3	(0)
2014–2015	→ ČSK Čelarevo (loan)	21	(3)
2015–2016	→ Proleter Novi Sad (loan)	29	(2)
2016–2017	Proleter Novi Sad	18	(1)
2017–2019	Šajkaš 1908		
2019	Hajduk 1912		
2019–2020	Zemun	20	(2)
2020–2024	Borac Šajkaš	4	(1)
2024-	FK Kabel	6	(6)
- * Club domestic league appearances and goals as of 14 August 2025

Luka Grgić (Serbian Cyrillic: Лука Гргић; born 7 June 1995) is a Serbian football striker.

== Club career ==
=== Vojvodina ===
He made his Jelen SuperLiga debut for Vojvodina on 3 May 2014 in 1:0 away loss to Javor.
