= Danijel Zlatković =

Serbian footballer

Personal information
- Full name: Danijel Zlatković
- Date of birth: 29 March 1996 (age 30)
- Place of birth: Paraćin, FR Yugoslavia
- Height: 1.75 m (5 ft 9 in)
- Position: Attacking midfielder

Team information
- Current team: Bor

Youth career
- OFK Paraćin
- Spartak Subotica

Senior career*
Years	Team	Apps	(Gls)
2014–2017	Spartak Subotica	3	(0)
2015–2016	→ Bačka 1901 (loan)	38	(12)
2016	→ ČSK Čelarevo (loan)	3	(1)
2017	→ TSC (loan)	13	(3)
2017	Bačka 1901		
2018	Modriča	16	(0)
2019	Sloga Gornje Crnjelovo	11	(0)
2019	Borac Paraćin		
2020–2021	Timočanin		
2022	Radnički Svilajnac		
2023-2024	Borac Paraćin		
2025	Radnički Svilajnac		
2025–	Bor	21	(12)
- * Club domestic league appearances and goals as of 160 April 2026

Danijel Zlatković (Serbian Cyrillic: Данијел Златковић; born 29 March 1996) is a Serbian football midfielder who plays for Bor.

== Career ==
In January 2019, Zlatković joined OFK Sloga Gornje Crnjelovo in the First League of the Republika Srpska. Six months later, he moved to Borac Paraćin. In January 2020, he joined FK Timočanin.
