= Đorđe Radovanović =

Serbian footballer

Personal information
- Full name: Đorđe Radovanović
- Date of birth: 6 May 1993 (age 33)
- Place of birth: Belgrade, FR Yugoslavia
- Height: 1.89 m (6 ft 2 in)
- Position: Midfielder

Youth career
- Obrenovac 1905
- Red Star Belgrade
- Nacional Madeira

Senior career*
Years	Team	Apps	(Gls)
2012–2013	União Madeira	6	(1)
2013–2016	Čukarički	4	(0)
2015	→ Sinđelić Beograd (loan)	13	(4)
2015	→ Zemun (loan)	8	(0)
2016	Sinđelić Beograd	9	(0)
2016	Dinamo Vranje	11	(0)
2017–2018	Bežanija	30	(12)
2019	Spartak Subotica	7	(0)
2019	Trayal Kruševac	12	(1)
2020	Budućnost Dobanovci	2	(0)
2020	Dinamo Pančevo		
2021	Omladinac Novi Banovci		
2021	Sloga 33		
2021	Borac Klenak		
2022-	FK Rušanj		

International career^{‡}
2012	Serbia U-19	6	(0)
- * Club domestic league appearances and goals as of 25 December 2022 ‡ National team caps and goals as of 12 March 2017

Đorđe Radovanović (Serbian Cyrillic: Ђорђе Радовановић; born 6 May 1993) is a Serbian football midfielder.
