= Nikola Šakić =

Serbian footballer

Personal information
- Full name: Nikola Šakić
- Date of birth: 2 October 1995 (age 31)
- Place of birth: Sombor, FR Yugoslavia
- Height: 1.73 m (5 ft 8 in)
- Position: Defensive midfielder

Youth career
- Red Star Belgrade
- Čukarički

Senior career*
| Years | Team | Apps | (Gls) |
| 2013–2015 | Čukarički | 6 | (0) |
| 2014 | → Sinđelić Beograd (loan) | 12 | (0) |
| 2015 | → Kolubara (loan) | 20 | (0) |
| 2016 | Napredak Kruševac | 12 | (0) |
| 2016–2017 | Proleter Novi Sad | 23 | (0) |
| 2018 | OFK Odžaci | | |
| 2018–2021 | Crvenka | | |
| 2022 | Hajduk Kula | | |

International career^{‡}
| 2011–2012 | Serbia U17 | 5 | (0) |
- * Club domestic league appearances and goals as of 27 May 2017 ‡ National team caps and goals as of 3 June 2014

Nikola Šakić (Serbian Cyrillic: Никола Шакић; born 2 October 1995) is a Serbian footballer who plays as a midfielder.

== Honours ==
Napredak Kruševac

- Serbian First League: 2015–16
