= Stevan Živković (footballer) =

Serbian footballer

Personal information
- Full name: Stevan Živković
- Date of birth: 18 October 1989 (age 37)
- Place of birth: Sremska Mitrovica, SFR Yugoslavia
- Height: 1.65 m (5 ft 5 in)
- Position: Attacking midfielder

Senior career*
Years	Team	Apps	(Gls)
2007–2009	Arilje		
2009–2010	Metalac Trgovački	9	(2)
2010	→ Big Bull Bačinci (loan)	15	(2)
2010–2011	Radnički Šid	25	(2)
2011–2012	Bežanija	26	(3)
2012–2014	Napredak Kruševac	14	(2)
2013–2014	→ Bežanija (loan)	22	(5)
2014	Radnički Kragujevac	7	(0)
2015	Metalac Gornji Milanovac	11	(0)
2015–2016	Bežanija	13	(1)
2016	Zeta	24	(3)
2017	Mačva Šabac	8	(0)
2017–2018	Gandzasar Kapan	23	(1)
- * Club domestic league appearances and goals as of 30 November 2018

Stevan Živković (Serbian Cyrillic: Стеван Живковић; born 18 October 1989) is a Serbian retired football midfielder.
