= Denis Biševac =

Serbian footballer

Personal information
- Date of birth: 22 September 1996 (age 30)
- Place of birth: Novi Pazar, FR Yugoslavia
- Height: 1.79 m (5 ft 10 1/2 in)
- Position: Right-back

Team information
- Current team: Jošanica

Youth career
- –2015: Novi Pazar

Senior career*
Years	Team	Apps	(Gls)
2015–2018	Novi Pazar	8	(0)
2015	→ Jošanica (loan)		
2018–2019	Velež Mostar	16	(0)
2019–2020	Novi Pazar	14	(0)
2020-	Jošanica		
- * Club domestic league appearances and goals as of 14 June 2020

Denis Biševac (Serbian Cyrillic: Денис Бишевац; born 22 September 1996) is a Serbian professional footballer who plays as a right-back.

== Club career ==
=== Novi Pazar ===
Biševac joined the first team of FK Novi Pazar during the 2014–15 season, and also stayed with youth team until the end of same season.

After the end of his youth career, Biševac stayed with the first team under a scholarship contract until the end of 2015. He also spent some period during 2015 with FK Jošanica at dual registration.

Biševac made his senior debut for Novi Pazar in the 30th fixture match of 2015–16 Serbian SuperLiga against FK Radnik Surdulica on 3 May 2016, replacing Irfan Vusljanin in the 86th minute of that match.

He left Novi Pazar in the summer of 2018.

=== Velež Mostar ===
On 18 June 2018, Biševac signed with First League of FBiH club FK Velež Mostar. He made his debut for Velež on 25 August 2018, in a 1–3 away win against NK Jedinstvo Bihać.

On 25 May 2019, Biševac won the First League of FBiH with Velež after the club beat NK Bosna Visoko 0–2 away and got promoted to the Premier League of Bosnia and Herzegovina.

=== Return to Novi Pazar ===
In July 2019, Biševac left Velež after his contract got expired and decided to return to Novi Pazar.

== Career statistics ==
=== Club ===
As of match played 4 May 2019

Club	Season	League			Cup		Continental		Other		Total	
Club	Season	Division	Apps	Goals	Apps	Goals	Apps	Goals	Apps	Goals	Apps	Goals
Novi Pazar	2014–15	Serbian SuperLiga	0	0	0	0	—		—		0	0
Novi Pazar	2015–16	Serbian SuperLiga	4	0	0	0	—		—		4	0
Novi Pazar	2016–17	Serbian SuperLiga	4	0	1	0	—		—		5	0
Novi Pazar	2017–18	Serbian First League	0	0	0	0	—		—		0	0
Novi Pazar	Total		8	0	1	0	—		—		9	0
Velež Mostar	2018–19	First League of FBiH	16	0	1	0	—		—		17	0
Novi Pazar	2019–20	Serbian League	0	0	0	0	—		—		0	0
Career total			24	0	2	0	—		—		26	0

== Honours ==
=== Club ===
Velež Mostar

- First League of FBiH: 2018–19
