= Uroš Mirković (footballer) =

Serbian footballer

Personal information
- Full name: Uroš Mirković
- Date of birth: 8 August 1990 (age 36)
- Place of birth: Prokuplje, SFR Yugoslavia
- Height: 1.74 m (5 ft 9 in)
- Position: Attacking midfielder

Senior career*
Years	Team	Apps	(Gls)
2008	Topličanin		
2009–2011	Bežanija	62	(4)
2012	Sopot	10	(0)
2012–2013	Mladenovac	35	(2)
2014	Sinđelić Beograd	27	(7)
2015	Donji Srem	11	(2)
2015	Radnik Surdulica	9	(0)
2016–2017	Krupa	31	(2)
2017	Borac Banja Luka	11	(1)
2018	Sinđelić Beograd	14	(3)
2019–2021	Radnički Pirot	36	(2)
2021–2023	Tikvesh	39	(2)
- * Club domestic league appearances and goals as of 29 December 2024

Uroš Mirković (Serbian Cyrillic: Урош Мирковић; born 8 August 1990) is a Serbian football midfielder.
