= Siniša Mladenović =

Serbian footballer (born 1991)

Personal information
- Full name: Siniša Mladenović
- Date of birth: 5 January 1991 (age 35)
- Place of birth: Mostar, SFR Yugoslavia
- Height: 1.81 m (5 ft 11 in)
- Position: Right-back

Team information
- Current team: Sloga Požega

Youth career
- Sloga Kraljevo

Senior career*
Years	Team	Apps	(Gls)
2008–2014	Sloga Kraljevo	87	(1)
2010	→ Metalac Kraljevo (loan)	11	(0)
2014–2016	Bokelj	62	(0)
2016–2019	Radnik Surdulica	69	(0)
2019	Zemun	14	(0)
2019–2020	Grafičar Beograd	11	(0)
2020–2021	Enosi Aspropyrgos		
2021	Anagennisi		
2022	Grbalj		
2023-2024	Iskra	33	(0)
2024-	Sloga Požega		
- * Club domestic league appearances and goals as of 22:01, 4 February 2020 (UTC)

Siniša Mladenović (Serbian Cyrillic: Синиша Младеновић; born 5 January 1991) is a Serbian professional footballer who plays as a defender for Sloga Požega.

== Club career ==
=== Sloga Kraljevo ===
Born in Mostar, Mladenović passed the youth school of Sloga Kraljevo. He made his debut for the first team of same club during the 2008–09 season, making 2 Serbian League West appearances. As he did not play in the Serbian First League next season, six months before the end of youth career, he was loaned to neighbourhood, and spent spring half of the 2009–10 season with Metalac Trgovački, playing in the Serbian League West.

==== 2010–11 season ====
After Metalac got relegated to the Morava Zone League, Mladenović returned in Sloga for the 2010–11 season. During the season, Mladenović was mostly used as a back-up player. Next Jovica Vasilić left the club on loan to Sloboda Užice in the winter break off-season, Mladenović also started some matches on the field. He noted 13 appearances including matches against Polet Ljubić, Jedinstvo Ub, Šumadija Aranđelovac, Sloboda Čačak, Sloga Petrovac na Mlavi, Mačva Šabac, and semi-final cup match of Šumadija and Western Serbia against Zlatar Nova Varoš. During the season he was used mainly as a right-back, but he also appeared as a wide and central midfielder, or centre-back sometimes.

==== 2011–12 season ====
Siniša spent first match of the season on the bench, but after Jovica Vasilić extended loan at Sloboda Užice, Mladenović got the chance in first squad from the 2 fixture match against Teleoptik, played on the Kraljevo City Stadium. In next fixture, against Mladost Lučani he got red card after 20 minutes of the game and suspension for next round. Later, during the season, Mladenović was mostly standard on the right-back position. He missed several matches between 23 and 25 fixture. In 26 fixture away match against Napredak Kruševac, Mladenović was substituted in for Rašo Babić in the half-time.

==== 2012–13 season ====
Mladenović started 2012–13 season in the first squad. After first match against Kolubara, played away, he missed home match against Borac Čačak in the 2 fixture, when Veljko Antonijević played on that position. Later, he played all matches until the end of first half-season, including cup match against OFK Beograd, when he replaced Dušan Mladenović in second half of that match. He started 2 matches from the bench, against Jedinstvo Putevi, and Radnički Nova Pazova. In the first spring fixture, against Kolubara, Mladenović got the red card after one duel with Saša Jovanović. Previously, he moved on left-back position, because of Miloš Milovanović's injury. Later, coach Neško Milovanović converted Marko Gobeljić to right-back, so Siniša moved on the bench. For the rest of season, he made 8 appearances, just two times the whole 90 minutes.

==== 2013–14 season ====
Coming Veljko Dovedan for the coach of Sloga Kraljevo, Mladenović was often changing position on the field for the 2013–14 season. Gobeljić continued playing as a right-back, so Mladenović started season on the bench as a reserve player, usually replacing some of players during the game. Whereas Sloga started season with a pair of standard stoppers, Miletić and Drašković and a few of inexperienced players, Mladenović also played as a centre-back in some occasions. He made his first season start in away match against Radnik Surdulica. Later, he was mostly used as a left-wing and playing on that position he scored his only goal for the team in last fixture of the first half-season, against Proleter Novi Sad. In away match against Metalac Gornji Milanovac, Mladenović was paired with Danijel Gašić on stopper places, because Nemanja Miletić's yellow cards accumulation. He also played appeared as a left-back in a match against Inđija, replacing suspended Miloš Milovanović. After that match Dovedan left the club, and Igor Tufegdžić returned Mladenović on his original right-back position for the rest of season. After he made a mistake in a match against Borac Čačak, Milan Jevtović scored a goal for an away team, and Mladenović was replaced in the second half by Marko Gobeljić. Next the end of a season, Mladenović left the club.

=== Bokelj ===
In summer 2014, Mladenović joined Bokelj Kotor. For the first season in club, he was one of the most standard players, making 32 Montenegrin First League appearances, how much had just Milan Mijatović and Mirko Todorović. In the next season, he continued playing with Bokelj. He made 30 league and 6 cup appearances with 1 goal from direct free kick against Mladost Podgorica, mostly playing as a right-back. Mladenović also stayed with club for the 2016–17 UEFA Europa League qualifications. He assisted to Dejan Đenić for goal in the first round against Vojvodina. After 5–0 defeat in Novi Sad, Mladenović left the club.

=== Radnik Surdulica ===
On 22 July 2016, Mladenović signed two-year contract with Serbian SuperLiga club Radnik Surdulica.

== Career statistics ==
As of 4 April 2017

Club	Season	League			Cup		Continental		Other		Total	
Club	Season	Division	Apps	Goals	Apps	Goals	Apps	Goals	Apps	Goals	Apps	Goals
Sloga Kraljevo	2008–09	Serbian League West	2	0	0	0	—		—		2	0
Sloga Kraljevo	2009–10	Serbian First League	0	0	—		—		—		7	0
Sloga Kraljevo	2010–11	Serbian League West	13	0	0	0	—		1 (Note: Appearance in Western Serbia cup)	0	14	0
Sloga Kraljevo	2011–12	Serbian First League	29	0	—		—		—		29	0
Sloga Kraljevo	2012–13	Serbian First League	26	0	1	0	—		—		27	0
Sloga Kraljevo	2013–14	Serbian First League	17	1	0	0	—		—		17	1
Sloga Kraljevo	Total		87	1	1	0	—		1	0	89	1
Metalac Kraljevo (loan)	2009–10	Serbian League West	11	0	—		—		—		11	0
Bokelj	2014–15	Montenegrin First League	32	0	—		—		—		32	0
Bokelj	2015–16	Montenegrin First League	30	0	6	1	—		—		36	1
Bokelj	2016–17	Montenegrin First League	—		—		2	0	—		2	0
Bokelj	Total		62	0	6	1	2	0	—		70	1
Radnik Surdulica	2016–17	Serbian SuperLiga	22	0	2	0	—		—		24	0
Career total			182	1	9	1	2	0	1	0	194	2

== Honours ==
Sloga Kraljevo

- Serbian League West: 2010–11
