= Miloš Milovanović =

Serbian footballer (born 1987)

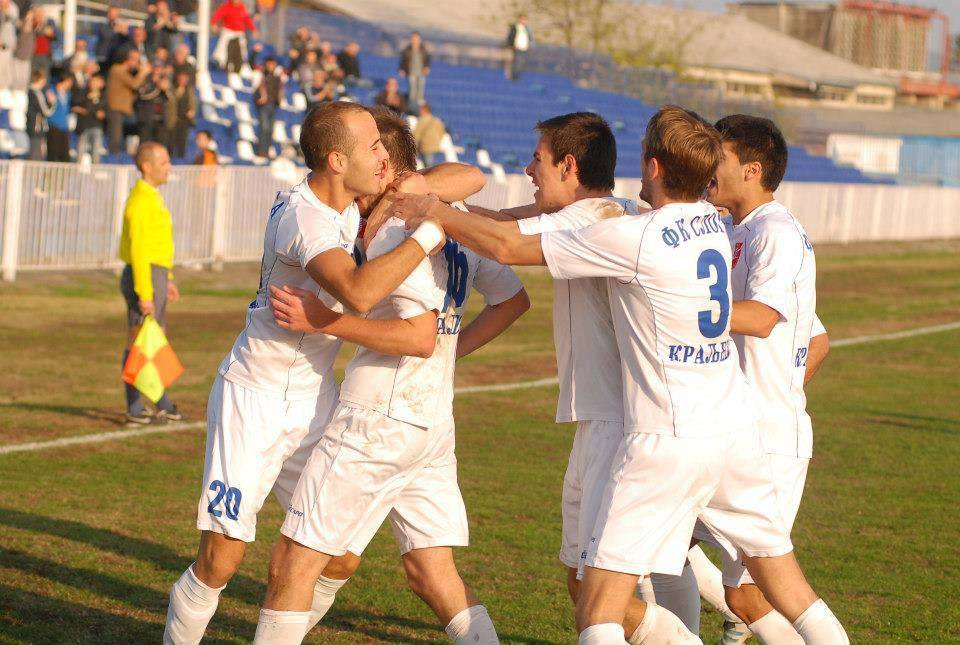
- Milovanović (3) with Sloga Kraljevo

Personal information
- Date of birth: 9 December 1987 (age 38)
- Place of birth: Kraljevo, SFR Yugoslavia
- Height: 1.86 m (6 ft 1 in)
- Position: Left back

Youth career
- Prva Petoletka

Senior career*
Years	Team	Apps	(Gls)
2005–2008	Trayal Kruševac		
2008–2010	Kopaonik Brus		
2011	Prva Petoletka		
2011–2014	Sloga Kraljevo	86	(3)
2014–2019	Radnik Surdulica	129	(12)
2019–2021	Napredak Kruševac	49	(0)
2021–2022	Mladost Novi Sad	45	(0)
- * Club domestic league appearances and goals as of 2 October 2023

Miloš Milovanović (Serbian Cyrillic: Милош Миловановић; born 9 December 1987) is a Serbian footballer. Mainly, he is a left-back, but he can also play as a centre-back in some occasions, or right-back optionally.

== Club career ==
=== Early years ===
Born in Kraljevo, Miloš passed youth categories with Prva Petoletka in Trstenik. He started his senior career in Trayal Kruševac in Pomoravlje Zone League. Playing for this club, Milovanović promoted in the Serbian League East for 2006–07 season. After three seasons playing for same club, he left the club. Playing for team from Brus, Milovanović continued in the Serbian League East. He was one of the best players in the team, and although he is a defender, he was also scoring goals, often from penalties and direct free kicks. During the winter break off-season 2010–11, Milovanović joined the football club of Prva Petoletka industry, together with his teammate from Kopaonik, Vladimir Simović. After season ended, he moved in Sloga Kraljevo on trial.

=== Sloga Kraljevo ===
==== 2011–12 season ====
Milovanović joined Sloga Kraljevo for 2011–12 season. After scouting his games in the team of Kopaonik and Prva Petoletka, Sloga decided to engage him on the left-back position, after Aleksandar Gojković's departure, and the trial which he passed. In the first season playing for new team, Milovananović made 32 appearances, how much only had Boban Dmitrović and Nemanja Miletić, his colleagues from defense, and also scored 1 goal. His engagement proved to be good job, because he was one of the most important players in the team that season.

==== 2012–13 season ====
For 2012–13 season, Sloga signed Dušan Mladenović from Sinđelić Niš, who also plays on the left-back position, so Milovanović had just 9 starts in the first half of season, but later, during the season he confirmed himself as the first choice. Sometimes, they played together on the field at the same time, so one of them played more offensive in that occasions. Although without scored goal, Milovanović often participated in attacking actions. He ended season with 28 league and 1 cup match, against OFK Beograd, and had the great contribution in the survival in the first league.

==== 2013–14 season ====
After Veljko Dovedan became the coach, Sloga opened season excellent, and Milovanović, as an other players, had important role in the team, by the way he was the only real left-back in the squad. He was untouchable on his position in the largest part of the season, and with great performances he classify as one of the best backs in league. In season 2013–14, he made 26 league appearances, with all starts, but he was substituted off two times and scored 2 goals, against Smederevo, when jumped highest after corner and against Bežanija from direct free kick. He also was sitting on the bench on two matches, and missed two games too, because of yellow card suspension. He also played a solid match in cup against Vojvodina, although he had captain of Vojvodina, Miroslav Vulićević against him, one of the best right-backs, and Enver Alivodić, one of the most searched right wingers that season in Serbia. After the end of season, he left the club.

=== Radnik Surdulica ===
==== 2014–15 season ====
Left-back joined Radnik Surdulica for 2014–15 season, where performed his ex teammates Jovan Jovanović and Bojan Šejić. He was one of the best and the most important player in team, and he was the second scorer in the team at the end of season, after Jovan Jovanović. He scored 6 goals, against Kolubara in 2nd, Jedinstvo Užice in 3rd, BSK Borča in 10th, Proleter Novi Sad in 16th, Sloboda Užice in 19, when also got the red card, and Sloga Petrovac in the 29th fixture of Serbian First League. With 27 league matches, he was one of the most standard in team which won Serbian First League, and promotion in the Serbian SuperLiga.

==== 2015–16 season ====
Milovanović made his Serbian SuperLiga debut for Radnik Surdulica in the 1st fixture, in away match against Spartak Subotica, played on 18 July 2015. He was the constant danger for opponent team along the left side, during the full-time, and also had some chances for goal. After solid role, he missed maybe the best chance before the end of match. In next fixture, against Vojvodina, he assisted to Slaviša Stojanović for first goal on the match. In the 3rd fixture, against Rad, Milovanović assisted to Milan Ćulum for the only goal of Radnik Surdulica in lost with 4:1 result on that match. Although he scored several goals in the Serbian First League, Miloš missed the chance from penalty against Čukarički. After Ljubo Baranin left the club, Milovanović has showed his long throw-ins. He was declared as the man of the match in 25 fixture match against Metalac Gornji Milanovac. Making 30 caps and was one of the most standard players in squad during the season.

==== 2016–17 season ====
After he started 2016–17 season on his original position, Milovanović played several fixtures as a centre-back, after Aleksandar Gojković's injury. He scored his first SuperLiga a goal in the 12th fixture match against Novi Pazar, played on 15 October 2016. Milovanović also performed as a right-back after Siniša Mladenović and Milan Milinković failed to play the 14 fixture match against Partizan. Milovanović noted an assist to Igor Zlatanović on that match. In the 21 fixture match against Red Star Belgrade, Milovanović lead the team as a captain, instead of Vladan Pavlović who spent the game on the bench. After he missed a match against Čukarički at the beginning of the play-off season because of the yellow cards accumulation, Milovanović was a scorer two times in a row, against Spartak Subotica and Rad.

== Career statistics ==
As of 31 March 2018

Appearances and goals by club, season and competition
Club	Season	League			Cup		Continental		Other		Total	
Club	Season	Division	Apps	Goals	Apps	Goals	Apps	Goals	Apps	Goals	Apps	Goals
Sloga Kraljevo	2011–12	Serbian First League	32	1	—		—		—		32	1
Sloga Kraljevo	2012–13	Serbian First League	28	0	1	0	—		—		29	0
Sloga Kraljevo	2013–14	Serbian First League	26	2	1	0	—		—		27	2
Sloga Kraljevo	Total		86	3	2	0	—		—		88	3
Radnik Surdulica	2014–15	Serbian First League	27	6	—		—		—		27	6
Radnik Surdulica	2015–16	Serbian SuperLiga	30	0	0	0	—		—		30	0
Radnik Surdulica	2016–17	Serbian SuperLiga	29	3	1	0	—		—		30	3
Radnik Surdulica	2017–18	Serbian SuperLiga	14	1	0	0	—		—		14	1
Radnik Surdulica	Total		100	10	1	0	—		—		101	10
Career total			186	13	3	0	—		—		189	13

== Honours ==
Trayal Kruševac

- Pomoravlje Zone League: 2005–06

Radnik Surdulica

- Serbian First League: 2014–15
