= Đorđe Đorđević =

Serbian footballer

Personal information
- Full name: Đorđe Đorđević
- Date of birth: 7 March 1988 (age 38)
- Place of birth: Topola, SFR Yugoslavia
- Height: 1.77 m (5 ft 10 in)
- Position: Midfielder

Team information
- Current team: FK Topola

Senior career*
Years	Team	Apps	(Gls)
2006–2007	→ Turbina Vreoci (loan)		
2007–2008	Šumadija Jagnjilo	17	(0)
2008–2010	Krka	31	(2)
2010–2011	Žarkovo	12	(1)
2011–2013	Sloga Kraljevo	51	(7)
2013–2014	Sinđelić Beograd	21	(1)
2014–2015	Apolonia Fier	20	(0)
2015–2021	FK Topola		
2021–2022	FK Šumadinac 1913		
2022–2023	OFK Budućnost Dudovica		
2023–	FK Topola		
- * Club domestic league appearances and goals as of 9 April 2015

Đorđe Đorđević (Serbian Cyrillic: Ђорђе Ђорђевић; born 7 March 1988) is a Serbian football midfielder.

== Career ==
=== Early career ===
He played for Turbina Vreoci, later Šumadija Jagnjilo, and then he moved to Slovenian club Krka from Novo Mesto. There he spent 2 seasons playing in lower ranked league. Also, he made 1 cup appearance in 2008–09 season. After playing in Slovenia, he returned in Serbian football, in Žarkovo.

=== Sloga Kraljevo ===
==== 2011-12 ====
He joined Sloga Kraljevo in season returning in Serbian First League. Smallish midfielder with number 13 on jersey fit in team very fast and he took a place in starting 11 already on the beginning. He usually played as defensive midfielder on the start of competition. He continued with good games, but after Veljko Antonijević's injury, he was moved on side right side midfielder. He showed that playing on that position is not strange for him, and because of playing near the opponents' goal he often scored goals. Đorđević was one of the best and most important players, together with Boban Dmitrović, Dejan Radosavljević, Darko Drinić, Miloš Janićijević, Nemanja Miletić, Marko Gobeljić... He ended season with 29 league appearances and scored 5 goals. 2 goals scored in away match against Srem Sremska Mitrovica, and 3 goals he scored in home wins against Radnički Sombor, Kolubara, and Novi Sad

==== 2012-13 ====
After successful season playing for Sloga, he was on abroad trial, but after failed engagement, he returned in Sloga, but because he missed preparing with team, he started season later. He mainly changed with Emir Rovčanin on defensive midfielder position until the end of first half of season. Later he played more offensive, playing as central midfielder. In season 2012–13, he made 21 league appearances, scoring 2 goals, against Radnički Nova Pazova away, and Voždovac home, when he was declared as man of the match. He also played on Lav Cup match in Sloga's lost with result 5:0 against OFK Beograd, replacing Dejan Radosavljević in second half.

=== Sinđelić Beograd ===
After playing for Sloga, he moved in Sinđelić Beograd, where he was one of the most important, usually wearing number 4 on his jersey. He started 21 match, some matches he was sitting on the bench. He scored 1 goal, and got 6 yellow and 2 red cards.

=== Apolonia Fier ===
After season with Sinđelić Beograd, he left in Albania, in Apolonia Fier. He made his Albanian Superliga debut in away lost 3:0 against KF Tirana. He played 20 league and 2 cup matches for Apolonia. After incident with Vilson Caković, he terminated the contract with club on 30 March 2015.

== Career statistics ==
As of 9 April 2015

Club performance			League		Cup		Continental		Total	
Season	Club	League	Apps	Goals	Apps	Goals	Apps	Goals	Apps	Goals
Serbia			League		Serbian Cup		Europe		Total	
2007–08	Šumadija Jagnjilo	Serbian League Belgrade	17	0	-				17	0
Slovenia			League		Slovenian Cup		Europe		Total	
2008-09	Krka	Slovenian Third League	20	1	3	0	-		23	1
2009-10	Krka	Slovenian Third League	11	1	0	0	-		11	1
Serbia			League		Serbian Cup		Europe		Total	
2010–11	Žarkovo	Serbian League Belgrade	12	1	-				12	1
2011–12	Sloga Kraljevo	Serbian First League	29	5	-				29	5
2012–13	Sloga Kraljevo	Serbian First League	22	2	1	0	-		23	2
2013–14	Sinđelić Beograd	Serbian First League	21	1	-				21	1
Albania			League		Albanian Cup		Europe		Total	
2014–15	Apolonia Fier	Kategoria Superiore	20	0	2	0	0	0	22	0
Total	Serbia		101	9	1	0	-		102	9
Total	Slovenia		31	2	3	0	-		34	2
Total	Albania		20	0	2	0	0	0	22	0
Career total			152	9	6	0	0	0	158	11
