= Zoran Marušić =

Serbian footballer (born 1993)

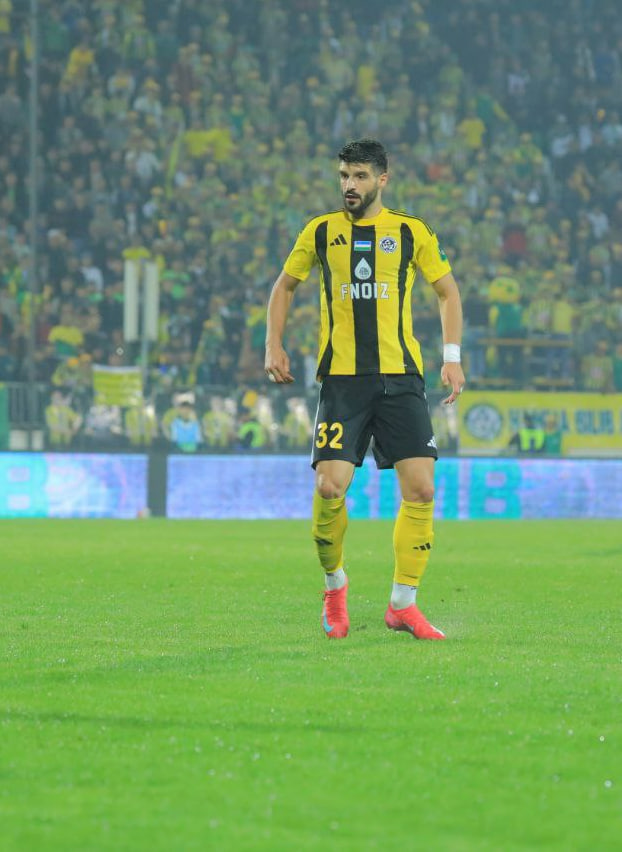

Personal information
- Date of birth: 29 November 1993 (age 32)
- Place of birth: Kraljevo, FR Yugoslavia
- Height: 1.87 m (6 ft 2 in)
- Positions: Midfielder; forward

Team information
- Current team: Neftchi Fergana
- Number: 32

Youth career
- Sloga Kraljevo

Senior career*
Years	Team	Apps	(Gls)
2010–2016	Sloga Kraljevo	84	(10)
2014	→ Voždovac (loan)	2	(0)
2016	Slavija Sarajevo	7	(1)
2016	Krupa	10	(1)
2017	BSK Borča	9	(0)
2017–2018	Temnić	29	(2)
2018	Sloboda Užice	14	(0)
2019	Dnyapro Mogilev	25	(4)
2020	Neman Grodno	27	(10)
2021	Dinamo Tbilisi	36	(16)
2022	Navbahor Namangan	25	(11)
2023	Dinamo Tbilisi	33	(17)
2024	Nasaf	22	(9)
2025–	Neftchi Fergana	38	(12)
- * Club domestic league appearances and goals as of 20:20, 28 July 2026 (UTC)

Zoran Marušić (Serbian Cyrillic: Зоран Марушић; born 29 November 1993) is a Serbian professional footballer who plays for Uzbekistani club Neftchi Fergana.

== Club career ==
=== Sloga Kraljevo ===
==== 2010–11 season ====
Born in Kraljevo, Marušić made his first football steps in football school "Bambi" in his home town. Later he moved to Sloga Kraljevo, where he passed all youth categories. Marušić joined the first team and made his first senior appearances for Sloga in the 2010–11 Serbian League West season, after which Sloga returned in the Serbian First League. During the season, Marušić made 6 appearances.

==== 2011–12 season ====
During the first half of 2011–12 Serbian First League season, Marušić mostly played with the youth team and did not make any appearances for the first team. At the beginning of the spring half-season, he was a back-up player several times, but after solid games and injuries of some standard players, he also started 9 matches on the field. He usually played as a defensive midfielder, but he also appeared as a centre-back. He collected 13 caps, scoring 1 goal.

==== 2012–13 season ====
After Boban Dmitrović's and Rašo Babić's retirements, Marušić started the 2012–13 Serbian First League season as a centre-back, pairing with Nemanja Miletić. During the first half season, Sloga had many problems in defense, because of insufficient experienced players and a lot of goals conceded. A new coach, Neško Milovanović brought Nenad Živanović for the second half-season, who played 7 matches, and then left the club due to personal reasons, so Marušić returned in the stopper position. However, he was injured before the end of season, Stefan Drašković replaced him in defense line. Marušić collected 28 league and 1 cup appearances for the season.

==== 2013–14 season ====
Making solid performances in previous season, Stefan Drašković continued playing as a centre-back, along with Nemanja Miletić. Coach Veljko Dovedan moved Marušić in midfield, but players with more experience had advantage and Marušić started season as back-up player after he recovered an injury. He was starting matches from the bench at the beginning of season, and adopted in starting 11 after Miloš Janićijević's injury, but he injured in shortly time again. Previously, he scored 5 goals on two matches. Marušić and Janićijević had also many injury problems almost the whole season. However, he scored 2 more goals until the end of first half-season, Marušić became one of the most effective players for that autumn in the Serbian First League. He is one of the most responsible for all 7 home victories of Sloga Kraljevo in first half-season. Marušić had the dispute with club at the beginning of 2014, when he requested a contract breaking. After his request was denied as groundless, he apologized to teammates and supporters and returned in the first team squad in 4th spring fixture. Later he played the whole matches until the end of season, 8 times as starter and 4 times he entered game from the bench. He noted 22 First League appearances, scoring 7 goals, and also played a cup match against Vojvodina.

==== 2014–15 season ====
===== Loaning to Voždovac =====
After Sloga's permission to all players for leaving the club, Marušić moved on loan to the Serbian SuperLiga side Voždovac along with Dragoljub Anđelković. He acquired condition to play in 3rd fixture of the 2014–15 season, against Rad, when he was substituted in for Ognjen Damnjanović on the beginning of second half. After his SuperLiga debut, he also started next match, against Čukarički. He left the club in the winter break off-season.

===== Return to Sloga Kraljevo =====
In January 2015 Marušić and Dragoljub Anđelković returned to Sloga. Marušić was related with Napredak Kruševac, in the winter break off-season, but he did not sign with the club. He started the second half-season as one of the most experienced players in the club, but he injured in 3rd spring fixture, and he did not play until 22 fixture, against Moravac Mrštane, when he scored a goal from direct free kick. He was in starting 11 in next fixture against Radnik Surdulica, when he renewed an injury and was substituted out during the first-half. Because of many injury problems, Marušić noted just 5 matches for Sloga in the 2014–15 Serbian First League season and scored 1 goal.

==== 2015–16 season ====
After the club relegated from the Serbian First League, Marušić started the 2015–16 season in Serbian League West, missing some matches including a cup match against Mokra Gora because of recovering an injury. During the first half-season, Marušić noted 10 appearances and scored 1 goal in the 15th fixture match against Mihajlovac 1934. In the winter break off-season, Marušić left the club and spent some period on trial with Zlaté Moravce. Previously, he was also training with the same club during the summer pre-season.

=== Slavija / Krupa ===
At the beginning of 2016, Marušić joined by Slavija Sarajevo recommendation by Veljko Dovedan's recommendation, who trained him as a coach of Sloga Kraljevo. Playing for the club, Marušić made 7 appearances in Premier League of Bosnia and Herzegovina, scoring 1 goal in away match against Borac Banja Luka.

In summer 2016, Marušić was related with Borac Banja Luka, but he started training with new Premier League club Krupa. During the first half of 2016–17 season, Marušić noted 10 league matches for that club with just 1 start, scoring a goal in a match against Sarajevo. He also played a Bosnian Cup match against Travnik. After the end of first half-season, Marušić terminated the contract and left club.

=== BSK Borča ===
At the beginning of 2017, Marušić joined BSK Borča, but was not licensed with the club until April same year. He made his first appearance for the club 21 fixture match of the 2016–17 Serbian First League season, against Bežanija. He collected 9 appearances at total for the club until the end of a season. Next the club relegated to the Serbian League Belgrade, Marušić left as a free agent.

=== Temnić ===
In summer 2017, Marušić joined new First League club Temnić. Passing the complete pre-season with the club, he was ordered to playing in the first squad. Marušić scored his first goal for new club in the first fixture of the 2017–18 Serbian First League season for 1–0 victory over Radnički Pirot.

=== Dinamo Tbilisi ===
On 15 January 2021, he signed a two-year contract with Dinamo Tbilisi.

=== Neftchi Fergana ===
On December 9, 2024, he signed a contract with the Fergana club Neftchi.

== Career statistics ==
As of 15 April 2018

Appearances and goals by club, season and competition
Club	Season	League			Cup		Continental		Other		Total	
Club	Season	Division	Apps	Goals	Apps	Goals	Apps	Goals	Apps	Goals	Apps	Goals
Sloga Kraljevo	2010–11	Serbian League West	6	0	0	0	—		0	0	6	0
Sloga Kraljevo	2011–12	Serbian First League	13	1	—		—		—		13	1
Sloga Kraljevo	2012–13	Serbian First League	28	0	1	0	—		—		29	0
Sloga Kraljevo	2013–14	Serbian First League	22	7	1	0	—		—		23	7
Sloga Kraljevo	2014–15	Serbian First League	5	1	—		—		—		5	1
Sloga Kraljevo	2015–16	Serbian League West	10	1	0	0	—		—		10	1
Sloga Kraljevo	Total		84	10	2	0	—		0	0	86	10
Voždovac (loan)	2014–15	Serbian SuperLiga	2	0	0	0	—		—		2	0
Slavija Sarajevo	2015–16	Bosnian Premier League	7	1	—		—		—		7	1
Krupa	2016–17	Bosnian Premier League	10	1	1	0	—		—		11	1
BSK Borča	2016–17	Serbian First League	9	0	—		—		—		9	0
Temnić	2017–18	Serbian First League	21	1	—		—		—		21	1
Career total			133	13	3	0	—		0	0	136	13
