= Marko Gobeljić =

Serbian footballer (born 1992)

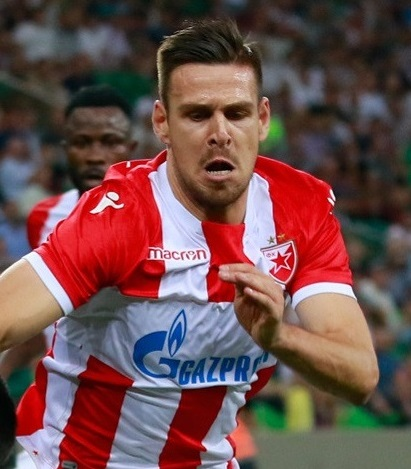
- Gobeljić with Red Star Belgrade in 2017

Personal information
- Full name: Marko Gobeljić
- Date of birth: 13 September 1992 (age 34)
- Place of birth: Kraljevo, FR Yugoslavia
- Height: 1.85 m (6 ft 1 in)
- Position: Right back

Team information
- Current team: OFK Beograd
- Number: 77

Youth career
- Bubamara Kraljevo
- Sloga Kraljevo

Senior career*
Years	Team	Apps	(Gls)
2010–2014	Sloga Kraljevo	116	(7)
2014–2017	Napredak Kruševac	84	(7)
2017–2023	Red Star Belgrade	116	(10)
2023–2024	Kifisia	23	(0)
2024–	OFK Beograd	53	(1)

International career^{‡}
2016–2019	Serbia	3	(0)
- * Club domestic league appearances and goals as of 12 June 2026 ‡ National team caps and goals as of 10 October 2019

Marko Gobeljić (Serbian Cyrillic: Марко Гобељић; born 13 September 1992) is a Serbian professional footballer who plays as a right back for Serbian SuperLiga club OFK Beograd.

== Club career ==
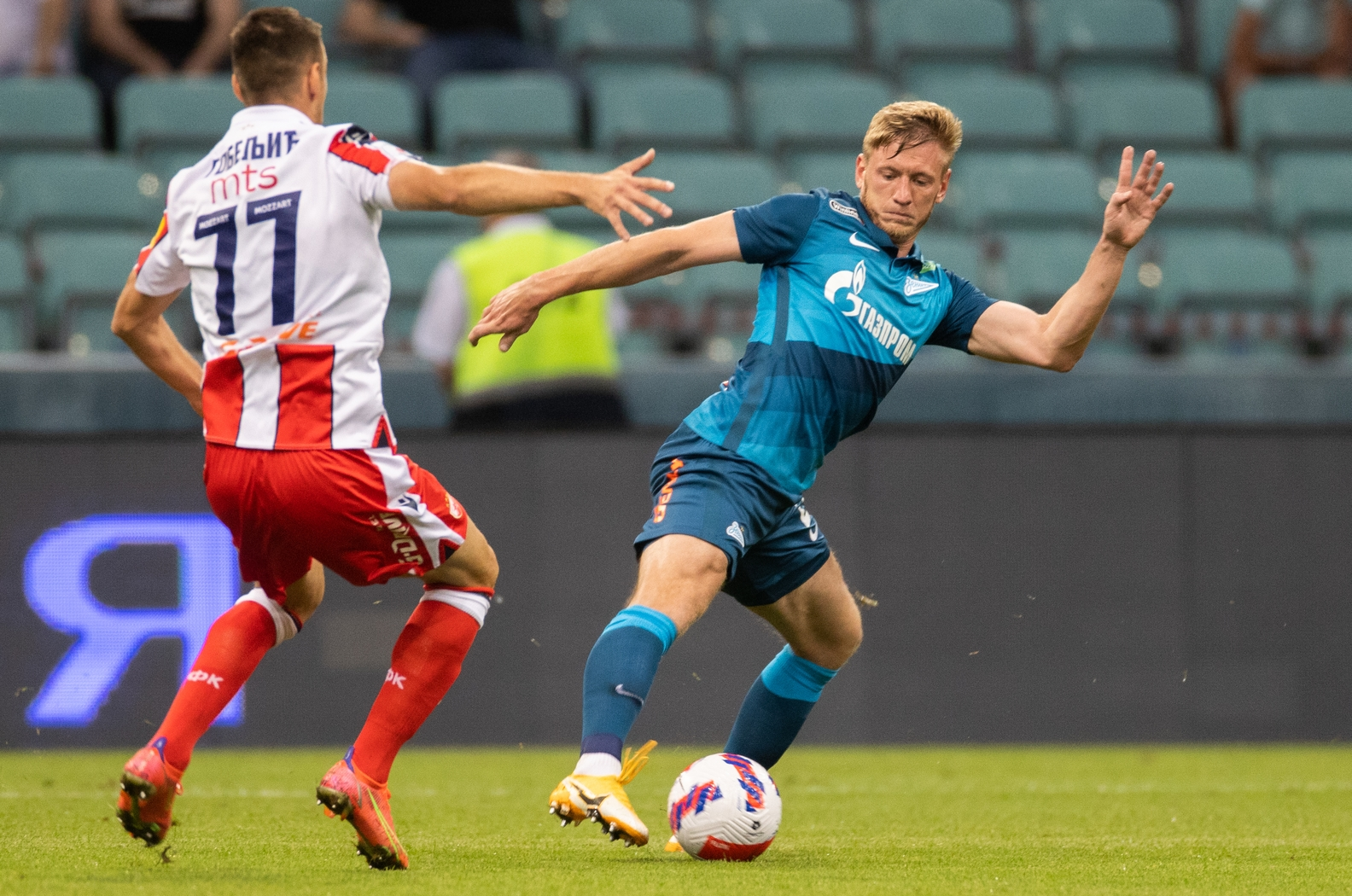
Gobeljić in action for Red Star Belgrade in 2022 against Zenit Saint Petersburg

=== Sloga Kraljevo ===
Gobeljić started training football with local football school Bubamara 1991, and later passed all youth categories of Sloga Kraljevo. He had started playing with the first team as a bonus player in the 2010–11 season. In his debut season he played 27 league games and one Serbian Cup match, against Red Star Belgrade in front of a full Kraljevo City Stadium on 22 September 2010. At the beginning of his senior career, he was mostly used as a midfielder, but he also appeared as a right-back in some matches during the spring half-season, after Jovica Vasilić left the club.

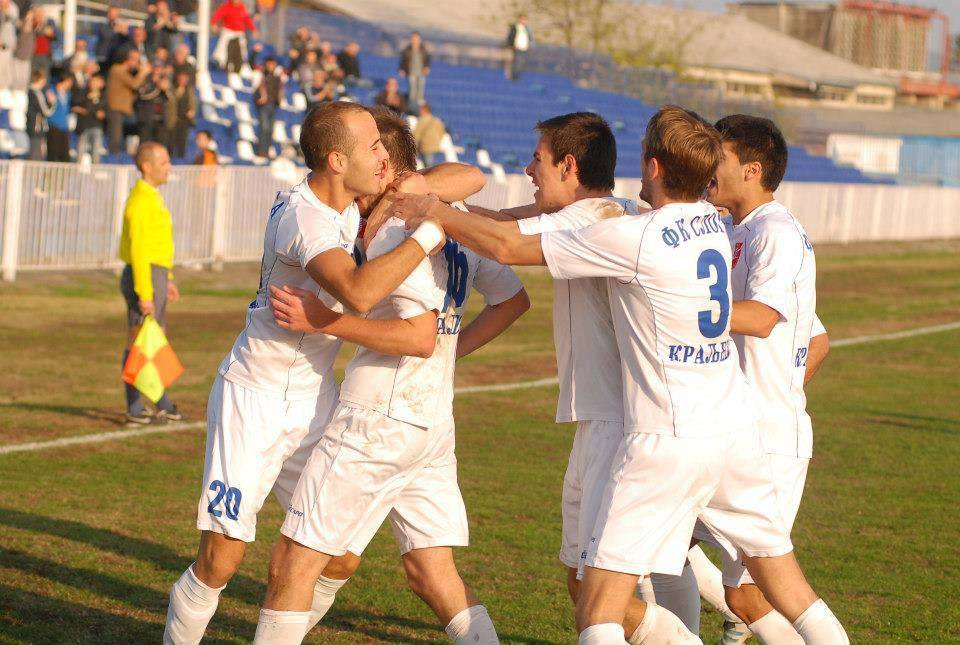
Gobeljić in the middle, celebrating a goal for Sloga with teammates

For the 2011–12 season, after Sloga was promoted in the First League, he scored a total of three goals over the course of 31 league matches. He played most frequently as a central midfielder, but he also appeared as a right-back in some matches. At home 1–2 defeat against Čukarički, he played on stopper place, after Boban Dmitrović had been substituted out at the half-time. Previously he scored a goal in the same game. Later, during the competition, he scored two more goals in matches against Proleter Novi Sad and OFK Mladenovac.

During the 2012–13 season, Gobeljić continued playing primarily as a central midfielder until coach Neško Milovanović moved him to right-back before the end of the season. He was the most standard player of the season, making 32 First League appearances and one cup appearance away against OFK Beograd, when Sloga lost 5–0. Although he did not score a goal, he was nominated for the man of the match once that season.

In the following season, the first team captain Aleksandar Božović dropped out of the starting eleven, with the more experienced Bojan Šejić replacing him on goal. Gobeljić got an armband as a vice-captain ahead Miloš Janićijević and Nemanja Miletić. On 25 September 2013, Gobeljić scored a goal in a cup match against Vojvodina, which went into overtime after a 1–1 tie. He also scored against Srđan Žakula in the penalty series, although Sloga was eliminated after penalties. as Sloga's captain he was nominated for man of the match. Around this time he began playing more frequently as a utility player. He played mostly matches as a right-back during the season.

=== Napredak Kruševac ===
Gobeljić signed a contract with Napredak in July 2014, and took number 77 jersey. He made his Serbian SuperLiga debut for Napredak in home defeat against Čukarički on 9 August 2014, when he replaced Ibrahima Mame N'Diaye at the beginning of second half. He was recognized as one of the best players for the first half-season.

On 9 April 2015, Gobeljić scored his first goal for Napredak against Vojvodina, in what was Napredak's first ever win against Vojvodina in Novi Sad. During the regular season, Gobeljić made 26 league and one cup appearance, scoring one goal total. Finally, he played both matches in the league play-off against Metalac Gornji Milanovac, after which Napredak was relegated from the SuperLiga.

After Napredak was relegated to the Serbian First League, Gobeljić played all matches until the end of first half season. He started season as a right-back, but after Igor Zonjić joined the club, he moved back to the midfield. During the season, he was playing on both positions. He scored a goal in a match against ČSK Pivara on 19 March 2016. After Napredak won the 2016 Serbian First League, he was also elected in the team of the season by Sportski žurnal, along with teammates Bojan Beljić and Ibrahima Mame N'Diaye.

In summer 2016, before the start of new season, Gobeljić played several friendly matches and scored two goals, against Radnički Niš on 25 June, and Radnik Surdulica on 16 July 2016. He scored his first goal in the 2016-17 season from Miloš Vulić's assist against Red Star Belgrade on 22 July 2016 at Rajko Mitić Stadium. In the following league match against Partizan, Bojan Šaranov fouled Gobeljić for penalty kick, which Nenad Šljivić scored. On 10 September 2016, he scored his second season goal against Čukarički, after which he was nominated man of the match and took a place in team of the fixture.

In October 2016, he extended his contract with Napredak to the summer 2018. Gobeljić also scored a goal in the next fixture match, against Novi Pazar. He scored against Partizan on 25 November 2016. Gobeljić also scored three goals during the winter break-off season. On 14 April 2017, he scored his last goal for Napredak that season against OFK Bačka.

=== Red Star Belgrade ===
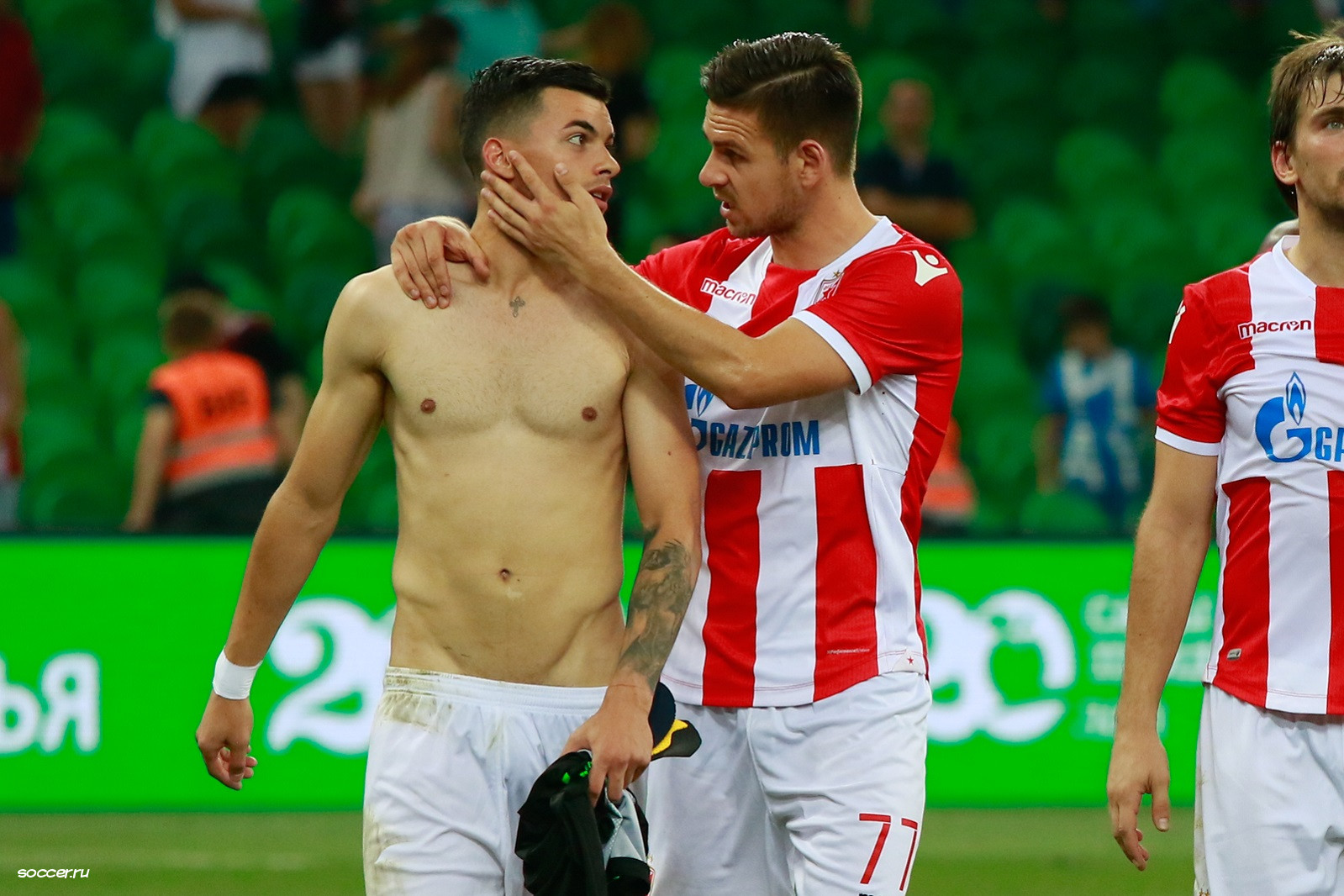
Nemanja Radonjić and Gobeljić after the 2017 UEFA Europa League play-off against Krasnodar.

On 7 June 2017, Belgrade media reported about Gobeljić's signing with Red Star Belgrade, after his long-time friend Jovan Kastratović shared a picture of his contract on Instagram. Gobeljić was officially promoted by club's sports director Mitar Mrkela two days later, penning a three-year contract.

He made his debut for Red Star in the second leg of the first qualifying round of the 2017–18 Europa League, substituting Ricardinho against Floriana. Only minutes after taking Ricardinho's place, Gobeljić was sent off after one bad tackle on one of the opposing players. He played his first eternal derby on 27 August 2017 as a left back. He scored his first goal for Red Star in their 5–0 victory over Radnik Surdulica on 29 November 2017.

On 13 May 2018, he made two assists in Red Star's 1–2 away win against Vojvodina as a right-back, and was named man of the match. On 20 July 2018, Gobeljić lead the team as a captain in 3–0 victory over Dinamo Vranje, in the first fixture of the 2018–19 Serbian SuperLiga campaign.

On 16 July 2019, Gobeljić got a red card after making a bad tackle on Sūduva defender Vaidas Slavickas during the first qualifying round of the 2019–20 UEFA Champions League. Slavickas's leg broke in two different areas and had to undergo surgery. Gobeljić visited him in the hospital to apologize. On 22 June 2020 he tested positive for COVID-19.

On 25 May 2021, Gobeljić caused a controversy after Red Star's penalty shoot out win against Partizan Belgrade in the 2020–21 Serbian Cup final, lowering his shorts and making a cojones gesture towards Vladimir Stojković. Shortly after, Red Star apologized for the incident, claiming that Gobeljić will be punished for his actions.

== International career ==
Gobeljić was called by coach Slavoljub Muslin to the Serbia national team in September 2016 and he made his international debut in a friendly 3–0 loss to Qatar. He also received a call for a friendly match against United States, on 29 January 2017.

== Style of play ==
Through the professional career, Gobeljić affirmed himself as a utility player. He has started as a central midfielder being capable of playing left and right. Playing with Sloga Kraljevo, he converted to right-back for a period, while playing for Napredak and Red Star. In his third season with Napredak, manager Dragan Ivanović moved him upfield, where he spent mostly time as a second striker and winger. Joining Red Star Belgrade, Gobeljić changed many places on the field at the beginning, including left-back and defensive midfielder positions.

Internationally, coach Slavoljub Muslin used him as a centre forward and attacking midfielder. At the age of 24, Gobeljić was described as one of the best and the most intelligent footballers in the Serbian domestic competition. He is characterized by his abilities and passing skills.

== Career statistics ==
=== Club ===
As of end od 2023–24 season

Appearances and goals by club, season and competition
Club	Season	League			Cup		Continental		Other		Total	
Club	Season	Division	Apps	Goals	Apps	Goals	Apps	Goals	Apps	Goals	Apps	Goals
Sloga Kraljevo	2010–11	Serbian League West	27	1	2 (Note: Including preliminary round against Radnički Niš and first round against Red Star Belgrade)	0	—		1 (Note: Including an appearance in the Western Serbia Cup against Zlatar)	0	30	1
Sloga Kraljevo	2011–12	Serbian First League	31	3	—		—		—		31	3
Sloga Kraljevo	2012–13	Serbian First League	32	0	1	0	—		—		33	0
Sloga Kraljevo	2013–14	Serbian First League	26	3	1	1	—		—		27	4
Sloga Kraljevo	Total		116	7	4	1	—		1	0	121	8
Napredak Kruševac	2014–15	Serbian SuperLiga	26	1	1	0	—		2 (Note: Both appearances in the relegation play-off)	0	29	1
Napredak Kruševac	2015–16	Serbian First League	26	1	2	0	—		—		28	1
Napredak Kruševac	2016–17	Serbian SuperLiga	32	5	1	0	—		—		33	5
Napredak Kruševac	Total		84	7	4	0	—		2	0	90	7
Red Star Belgrade	2017–18	Serbian SuperLiga	23	1	3	0	10 (Note: All appearances in UEFA Europa League)	0	—		36	1
Red Star Belgrade	2018–19	Serbian SuperLiga	25	5	5	0	8 (Note: Appearances in UEFA Champions League)	1	—		38	6
Red Star Belgrade	2019–20	Serbian SuperLiga	17	2	3	0	12	0	—		32	2
Red Star Belgrade	2020–21	Serbian SuperLiga	26	0	5	0	9	0	—		40	0
Red Star Belgrade	2021–22	Serbian SuperLiga	10	0	3	0	9	0	—		22	0
Red Star Belgrade	2022–23	Serbian SuperLiga	15	2	0	0	0	0	—		15	2
Red Star Belgrade	Total		116	10	19	0	48	1	—		183	11
Kifisia	2023–24	Super League Greece	23	0	1	0	—		—		24	0
Career total			339	24	28	1	48	1	3	0	418	26

=== International ===
As of 10 October 2019

Serbia
Year	Apps	Goals
2016	1	0
2017	1	0
2018	0	0
2019	1	0
Total	3	0

== Personal life ==
In August 2021, Gobeljić married Serbian singer Katarina Grujić. She gave birth to their daughter in December the same year.

== Honours ==
Sloga Kraljevo

- Serbian League West: 2010–11

Napredak Kruševac

- Serbian First League: 2015–16

Red Star Belgrade

- Serbian SuperLiga (6): 2017–18, 2018–19, 2019–20, 2020–21, 2021–22, 2022–23
- Serbian Cup (3): 2020–21, 2021–22, 2022–23

Individual

- Serbian SuperLiga Player of the Week: 2022–23 (Round 14)
