= Stefan Drašković =

Serbian footballer (born 1989)

Personal information
- Full name: Stefan Drašković
- Date of birth: 27 July 1989 (age 37)
- Place of birth: Kraljevo, SFR Yugoslavia
- Height: 1.91 m (6 ft 3 in)
- Position: Centre-back

Team information
- Current team: Sloga Kraljevo
- Number: 4

Youth career
- Sloga Kraljevo

Senior career*
| Years | Team | Apps | (Gls) |
| 2006–2008 | Sloga Kraljevo | 9 | (0) |
| 2008–2009 | Mačva Šabac | 24 | (0) |
| 2009–2010 | Metalac Trgovački | (Note: Drašković was also a part of team in the first half of the 2010–11 season in the Morava Zone League. There is no information about the statistics, except the matches Vodojaža, Orlovac, and Polet Trbušani)25 | (0) |
| 2011 | Radnik Bijeljina | | |
| 2011–2012 | Sinđelić Niš | 14 | (1) |
| 2012–2013 | Sloga Kraljevo | 25 | (1) |
| 2014–2017 | Borac Čačak | 62 | (2) |
| 2017 | Dacia Chișinău | 9 | (0) |
| 2018 | Borac Čačak | 6 | (0) |
| 2018–2019 | Rudar Pljevlja | 7 | (0) |
| 2019– | Sloga Kraljevo | | |
- * Club domestic league appearances and goals as of 23:10, 27 May 2019 (UTC)

Stefan Drašković (Serbian Cyrillic: Стефан Драшковић; born 27 July 1989) is a Serbian footballer who plays as a defender for FK Sloga Kraljevo.

== Club career ==
=== Sloga Kraljevo ===
Born in Kraljevo, Drašković is a product of Sloga Kraljevo youth school. He made his senior debut for Sloga in 2006–07 season. He played total 5 matches for season. In 2007–08 season he played some matches, too. Derby match with city rival Metalac Trgovački maybe the most important. During the winter break off-season, Drašković played friendly matches, against Novi Pazar, and Metalac Gornji Milanovac. Then, he travelled to Ohrid with first team, and there played some matches on the preparing period. Until the end of season he played some more league matches, against Mačva Šabac, Jedinstvo Ub, and Sloboda Užice. He also played in final of Kraljevo City Cup, versus Metalac Trgovački, and final of Raška District Cup, against Jošanica.

=== Mačva, Metalac & Sinđelić ===
Drašković moved in Mačva Šabac for the 2008–09 season. He made 24 league appearances until the end of season. After season he spent in Šabac, he returned in his hometown Kraljevo, this time in Metalac Trgovački. He made 22 league appearances in 2008–09 season. He played versus Morava Velika Plana, Sloga Požega, Vujić Voda Valjevo, friendly match with city rival Sloga, matches against Jedinstvo Ub, and Sloga Petrovac na Mlavi. After playing with Metalac Trgovački, he spent some time with Radnik Bijeljina, and then he joined Sinđelić Niš in 2011. Although he had been usually used as a back-up choice in the first half-season, he played more constantly in second part of season. He made 14 league and 1 cup appearance and scored 1 goal for season 2011–12.

=== Return to Sloga Kraljevo ===
For the 2012–13, Drašković returned in Sloga. But he wasn't standard during the season. In first half, he was reserve player until Zoran Marušić's injury in second half of season. After that he became standard in tandem with Nemanja Miletić. He made 11 league appearances and scored 1 goal. He also played on Lav Cup match, which sloga lost with result 5:0.

Drašković and Miletić were one of the best defense tandems in league in first half of season. Sloga made all 7 home wins and they were 2 of the most important players in team. He played on 14 league matches, one missed because of yellow cards and Lav Cup against Vojvodina. On the winter break-off season, Drašković moved to Borac Čačak, together with Dejan Radosavljević.

=== Borac Čačak ===
Drašković signed with Borac Čačak on the winter break-off season. After Mario Maslać's and Ivan Đoković's injuries, Drašković and Lazar Obradović were standard stoppers until the end of season, and promotion in the Serbian SuperLiga.

He made his SuperLiga debut in 3rd season fixture against Čukarički replacing Aleksandar Gojković in 80 minute of match. He ended season with league appearances, including 1 start, against Mladost Lučani, and 90 minutes in cup versus Red Star Belgrade in tandem with Nemanja Miletić.

For the 2015–16 season, Drašković started as a reserve for Miletić and Jablan. First appearance in the season he made in 11th fixture, when he was substituted in from the bench. Next three matches he started on the field. In 12th fixture he played in tandem with Jablan, while Miletić was changing Tanasin as a right-back, but after Jablan's red card, and Miletić's yellow card suspensions, next match Drašković started in line with Obradović. Because of red card, Jablan missed one more match, and Drašković started match in the 14th fixture with 3rd different partner, his longtime friend Nemanja Miletić, but was replaced by Lazar Obradović in the second half because of injury. Fans rewarded him with applause for dedication to the game and the detail that Borac Čačak won all of those matches. In the last match before the winter break off-season, against Partizan, after Miletić's and Jablan's suspensions, Drašković started match in tandem with Stefan Đorđević, who was his 4th partner on stopper places. On 18 December 2015, Stefan extended his contract with Borac for 2 years.

At the premiere match of the 2016–17 Serbian SuperLiga season, Drašković was substituted in for injured Mario Maslać in 34 minute of the match against Metalac Gornji Milanovac. In the 6th fixture of the competition against Novi Pazar, Drašković scored his first goal for the club, but later he got a red card. Drašković scored his second goal for the season against Javor Ivanjica in 10 fixture of the SuperLiga, played on 25 September 2016. He was also nominated for the man of the match and promoted himself for the best team scorer. In 23 fixture match of the season against, Partizan, Drašković lead the team as a captain. After he sued the club for unpaid wages, he got the contract termination to the detriment of the club and left Borac after the end of a season.

=== Dacia Chișinău ===
On 15 June 2017, Drašković signed a one-and-a-half-year deal with Moldovan side Dacia Chișinău. He made his debut for new club in first leg of the 2017–18 UEFA Europa League first qualification round against Shkëndija on 29 June 2017. Drašković made his Moldovan National Division debut in 1–0 away win over Sfântul Gheorghe on 9 July 2017. He injured during the 3rd fixture match against Milsami, being substituted out in second half, after which he missed a period due to fragmentation fracture of the facial bone. He returned to the squad for a match against the same rival on 30 September 2017.

=== Return to Borac Čačak ===
At the beginning of 2018, Drašković moved back to Borac Čačak, but failed to be licensed for the 2017–18 Serbian SuperLiga campaign until 1 March same year.

=== Rudar Pljevlja ===
Drašković joined FK Rudar Pljevlja in the summer 2018. His contract was terminated in February 2019.

=== Return to Sloga Kraljevo ===
Ahead of the 2019-20 season, Drašković returned to FK Sloga Kraljevo and became the team's captain.

== Career statistics ==
As of 31 May 2018

Appearances and goals by club, season and competition
| Club | Season | League | | | Cup | | Continental | | Other | | Total | |
| Club | Season | Division | Apps | Goals | Apps | Goals | Apps | Goals | Apps | Goals | Apps | Goals |
|---|---|---|---|---|---|---|---|---|---|---|---|---|
| Sloga Kraljevo | 2006–07 | Serbian League West | 5 | 0 | — | | — | | — | | 5 | 0 |
| Sloga Kraljevo | 2007–08 | Serbian League West | 4 | 0 | — | | — | | 2 (Note: Including appearances in FSO Kraljevo Cup against Metalac Trgovački, and in the Raška District Cup against Jošanica) | 0 | 6 | 0 |
| Sloga Kraljevo | Total | | 9 | 0 | — | | — | | 2 | 0 | 11 | 0 |
| Mačva Šabac | 2008–09 | Serbian League West | 24 | 0 | — | | — | | — | | 24 | 0 |
| Metalac Trgovački | 2009–10 | Serbian League West | 22 | 0 | — | | — | | — | | 22 | 0 |
| Metalac Trgovački | 2010–11 | Morava Zone League | 3 | 0 | — | | — | | — | | 3 | 0 |
| Metalac Trgovački | Total | | 25 | 0 | — | | — | | — | | 25 | 0 |
| Sinđelić Niš | 2011–12 | Serbian First League | 14 | 1 | 1 | 0 | — | | — | | 15 | 1 |
| Sloga Kraljevo | 2012–13 | Serbian First League | 11 | 1 | 1 | 0 | — | | — | | 12 | 1 |
| Sloga Kraljevo | 2013–14 | Serbian First League | 14 | 0 | 1 | 0 | — | | — | | 15 | 0 |
| Sloga Kraljevo | Total | | 25 | 1 | 2 | 0 | — | | — | | 27 | 0 |
| Borac Čačak | 2013–14 | Serbian First League | 12 | 0 | — | | — | | — | | 12 | 0 |
| Borac Čačak | 2014–15 | Serbian SuperLiga | 4 | 0 | 1 | 0 | — | | — | | 5 | 0 |
| Borac Čačak | 2015–16 | Serbian SuperLiga | 15 | 0 | 3 | 0 | — | | — | | 18 | 0 |
| Borac Čačak | 2016–17 | Serbian SuperLiga | 31 | 2 | 2 | 0 | — | | — | | 33 | 2 |
| Borac Čačak | 2017–18 | Serbian SuperLiga | 6 | 0 | — | | — | | — | | 6 | 0 |
| Borac Čačak | Total | | 68 | 2 | 6 | 0 | — | | — | | 74 | 2 |
| Dacia Chișinău | 2017 | Moldovan National Division | 9 | 0 | 0 | 0 | 2 | 0 | — | | 11 | 2 |
| Career total | | | 174 | 4 | 9 | 0 | 2 | 0 | 2 | 0 | 187 | 4 |
