= Dragoljub Anđelković =

Serbian footballer (born 1993)

Personal information
- Full name: Dragoljub Anđelković
- Date of birth: 14 April 1993 (age 33)
- Place of birth: Kraljevo, FR Yugoslavia
- Height: 1.84 m (6 ft 1/2 in)
- Position: Forward

Youth career
- Sloga Kraljevo

Senior career*
Years	Team	Apps	(Gls)
2010–2015	Sloga Kraljevo	107	(20)
2014	→ Voždovac (loan)	3	(1)
2015	Petrovac	10	(3)
2016	Sloga Petrovac	6	(0)
2016–2017	Borac Čačak	12	(0)
2017–2018	Grafičar Beograd	18	(4)
2019	Żejtun Corinthians	9	(1)
2019	Prespa Birlik	11	(6)
2020	Sloga Kraljevo	19	(7)
2021	Ventspils	10	(2)
2021–2025	Sloga Kraljevo		
- * Club domestic league appearances and goals

Dragoljub Anđelković (Serbian Cyrillic: Драгољуб Анђелковић; born 14 April 1993) is a Serbian footballer who plays as a forward.

== Club career ==
=== Sloga Kraljevo ===
==== 2010–11 season ====
Born in Kraljevo, Anđelković passed the Sloga Kraljevo youth categories. In his debut season for the first team, he made 18 league appearances, and with 4 goals contributed to Sloga's returning to the Serbian First League. He was also sitting on the bench in the Serbian Cup match against Red Star Belgrade, but did not join the game.

==== 2011–12 season ====
In the 2012–13 season, Anđelković also played for the youth team, and he often led the team as a captain. In the first half of season he didn't play a lot of for the senior team, but in the second, he was a first reserve for Darko Drinić. Anđelković started 3 matches, and played total 22 games, without goals.

==== 2012–13 season ====
After Drinić's departure, Anđelković took jersey number 9 and started the season as a first choice in attack. But shortly, a footballer with more experience, Jovan Jovanović, arrived in Sloga, and Anđelković moved on to right-wing. He spent the season mainly at that position, but participated as a second striker, and he was one of the most effective players after Jovan Jovanović. He scored 7 goals and contributed to Sloga's staying in the league. He played on 26 league and 1 cup match.

==== 2013–14 season ====
Sloga started the season with players from last season, and one new player, Nemanja Lekanić, but added one more forward, Velimir Stanković from the second fixture. In the first half of the season Sloga made all 7 home wins, and took 5 points when away. Anđelković made 4 points directly, scoring a goal against BSK Borča in an away draw, and a home win versus Sinđelić Beograd. He scored that goal after a failed cross pass; the ball tricked goalkeeper Bubonja and entered into the goal. That was a very successful autumn for Sloga, but 4 forwards scored a total of 6 goals. Anđelković scored 2 goals, Stanković too, Nikola Radović scored 1 and Ivan Ćuković scored 1 goal. Sloga added a new forward, Milan Jovanović, for the second half of the season, and some fixtures after beginning the spring part of the championship. Anđelković dropped into the background; he was sitting on the bench in some matches, 5 times he entered the game, and he returned to the starting 11 until the end of season. He ended the season with 24 league appearances and 2 goals. He also played in the cup match against Vojvodina.

==== 2014–15 season ====
===== Loan to Voždovac =====
After Sloga's permission for all players to leave the club, Anđelković moved to Voždovac on loan along with Zoran Marušić. He had earned the right to play in the 3rd fixture against Rad. Anđelković scored the only goal for Voždovac on his Jelen SuperLiga debut in a debacle match 1–6 against Rad. He was the first player of Voždovac to respond to the Ice Bucket Challenge.

===== Return to Sloga Kraljevo =====
Anđelković and Marušić returned to Sloga in January 2015. Although Sloga was relegated to Serbian League West, Anđelković may have had his best half-season playing for Sloga. He played 14 matches in the league and scored a total of 7 goals: 4 at home, against Javor in the 16th, Kolubara in the 20th, Proleter in the 27th, and Sinđelić in the 29th fixture, and 3 away goals including 2 against Sloga Petrovac in the 26th, and 1 against Jedinstvo Putevi in the 28th fixture.

=== OFK Petrovac / Sloga Petrovac ===
After Sloga Kraljevo relegated from the Serbian First League, Anđelković moved in Montenegrin First League side OFK Petrovac. After he scored 3 goals on 10 matches during the first half of 2015–16 season, Dragoljub returned in Serbia and joined Sloga Petrovac. He made 6 First League appearances for the spring half-season, mostly as a back-up player. After the club dissolved in summer 2016, Anđelković left as a free agent.

=== Borac Čačak ===
In summer 2016, Anđelković joined Borac Čačak. After pre-season period, he signed a two-and-a-half-year deal with the club. He made his official debut for new club in second fixture match of the 2016–17 Serbian SuperLiga season, replacing Marko Zoćević in second half of a match against Mladost Lučani, played on 30 July 2016.

== Career statistics ==
As of 20 May 2017

Club	Season	League			Cup		Continental		Other		Total	
Club	Season	Division	Apps	Goals	Apps	Goals	Apps	Goals	Apps	Goals	Apps	Goals
Sloga Kraljevo	2010–11	Serbian League West	18	4	1	0	—		1 (Note: Appearance in Western Serbia Cup)	0	19	4
Sloga Kraljevo	2011–12	Serbian First League	25	0	—		—		—		25	0
Sloga Kraljevo	2012–13	Serbian First League	26	7	1	0	—		—		27	7
Sloga Kraljevo	2013–14	Serbian First League	24	2	1	0	—		—		25	2
Sloga Kraljevo	2014–15	Serbian First League	14	7	—		—		—		14	7
Sloga Kraljevo	Total		107	20	3	0	—		1	0	111	20
Voždovac (loan)	2014–15	Serbian SuperLiga	3	1	0	0	—		—		3	1
OFK Petrovac	2015–16	Montenegrin First League	10	3	—		—		—		10	3
Sloga Petrovac	2015–16	Serbian First League	6	0	—		—		—		6	0
Borac Čačak	2016–17	Serbian SuperLiga	11	0	0	0	—		—		11	0
Career total			137	24	3	0	—		1	0	141	24
