= Veljko Antonijević =

Serbian footballer

Personal information
- Full name: Veljko Antonijević
- Date of birth: 28 May 1992 (age 34)
- Place of birth: Raška, FR Yugoslavia
- Height: 1.84 m (6 ft 1/2 in)
- Positions: Right midfielder; right-back

Youth career
- Bane
- Sloga Kraljevo

Senior career*
Years	Team	Apps	(Gls)
2010–2014	Sloga Kraljevo	105	(6)
2015	Jagodina	6	(1)
2016–2017	BSK Borča	24	(0)
2017	Dinamo Vranje	8	(0)
2018	Sloboda Užice		
2018	Smederevo 1924		
- * Club domestic league appearances and goals as of 29 December 2017

Veljko Antonijević (Serbian Cyrillic: Вељко Антонијевић; born 28 May 1992) is a Serbian professional footballer who plays as a midfielder.

== Club career ==
=== Sloga Kraljevo ===
==== 2010–11 season ====
Born in Raška, Antonijević arrived in Sloga from local club Bane. After youth categories, he made his first appearances in first team of Sloga in 2010–11 season Serbian League West. At the beginning of competition, he was usually getting the chance from the bench, but later, in second half of season, he was often starting the matches. In his first senior season, he made 19 league appearances, and scored 1 goal. He was also sitting of the bench in a cup match, against Red Star Belgrade.

==== 2011–12 season ====
For the 2011–12 season, Antonijević mostly played regularly, with jersey number 8, he operated along the right line in midfield, until the 19th fixture, when he substituted out, because of injury. He didn't play until the 25 fixture, when he substituted in from the bench, but he renewed the injury, and got out after 23 minutes. 3 of 19 appearances, he started from the bench, and he was substituted out 12 times. He scored 2 goals against Mladenovac, and Radnički Sombor, both at home.

==== 2012–13 season ====
After recovered an injury, Antonijević started season in first 11, but he didn't fully recover, and he played variable in season extension, and often get the minutes from the bench. After 18th fixture, he didn't play until the 26th fixture. Although he missed better part of season, because of injury, he made 25 appearances contributed team for existence in league. He was also a member of Serbian First League representation.

==== 2013–14 season ====
Most players from the previous season left club, and place in team mainly got players from Kraljevo, and environment, from the youth system, together with some experienced players. Coach Veljko Dovedan included Antonijević in starting 11, and he and teammates have enormous merits for total 7 wins in first half of season, and draw result against Vojvodina in cup. He made 28 league appearances, all starts, and scored 2 goals, including one from corner kick, against BSK Borča.

==== 2014–15 season ====
First match in 2014–15 season Antonijević missed because of yellow card suspension. Since second fixture, against Bačka Bačka Palanka, he played all 14 fixtures, until the end of first half of season. He scored 1 goal against Bačka, from the direct free kick in home lost with result 1:4. As one of the most experienced player in team, he changed many positions on the field. He played on his primary right midfielder position, but he also played as a right-back, on left side, or as a central, and an attacking midfielder. After end of contract, he left club after the end first half of season.

=== Jagodina ===
He signed Jagodina in January 2015. Mostly games he passed on the bench, but he made his Jelen SuperLiga debut in 29 fixture, against Radnički Kragujevac. He was also substituted in from the bench in last fixture, against OFK Beograd, and scored a goal on that match. After a year spent with Jagodina, Antonijević terminated contract, and left the club in January 2016.

== Career statistics ==
As of 26 October 2016

Club	Season	League			Cup		Continental		Other		Total	
Club	Season	Division	Apps	Goals	Apps	Goals	Apps	Goals	Apps	Goals	Apps	Goals
Sloga Kraljevo	2010–11	Serbian League West	19	1	0	0	—		—		19	1
Sloga Kraljevo	2011–12	Serbian First League	19	2	—		—		—		19	2
Sloga Kraljevo	2012–13	Serbian First League	25	0	0	0	—		—		25	0
Sloga Kraljevo	2013–14	Serbian First League	28	2	1	0	—		—		29	0
Sloga Kraljevo	2014–15	Serbian First League	14	1	0	0	—		—		14	1
Sloga Kraljevo	Total		105	6	1	0	—		—		106	6
Jagodina	2014–15	Serbian SuperLiga	2	1	—		—		—		2	1
Jagodina	2015–16	Serbian SuperLiga	4	0	1	0	—		—		5	0
Jagodina	Total		6	1	1	0	—		—		6	1
BSK Borča	2015–16	Serbian First League	11	0	—		—		—		11	0
BSK Borča	2016–17	Serbian First League	0	0	0	0	—		—		0	0
BSK Borča	Total		11	0	0	0	—		—		11	0
Career total			122	7	2	0	—		—		124	7

== Honours ==
Sloga Kraljevo

- Serbian League West: 2010–11
