= Miloš Janićijević =

Serbian footballer

Personal information
- Date of birth: 21 March 1989 (age 37)
- Place of birth: Kraljevo, SFR Yugoslavia
- Height: 1.83 m (6 ft 0 in)
- Position: Attacking midfielder

Senior career*
Years	Team	Apps	(Gls)
2006–2009	Metalac Kraljevo	53	(5)
2009	→ Sloga Kraljevo (loan)	15	(6)
2009–2012	Sloga Kraljevo	80	(12)
2012–2013	Sloboda Užice	7	(0)
2013–2014	Sloga Kraljevo	17	(3)
2014–2015	Mačva Šabac	9	(0)
2015–2016	Dinamo Vranje	26	(1)
2016–2018	Mellieħa		
2018-2020	Snæfell	19	(9)
- * Club domestic league appearances and goals

Miloš "Moljac" Janićijević (Serbian Cyrillic: Милош Јанићијевић; born 21 March 1989) is a Serbian retired footballer.

== Club career ==
=== Metalac Trgovački ===
Janićijević started in local club Metalac Kraljevo. He began playing with first team in season 2006–07. On 15 played matches, he scored 2 goals.

Second season with first team for him. He played 24 league matches and scored 2 goals.

For first half of season, he played 14 league matches and scored 1 goal. Then he left in neighbourhood, in Sloga Kraljevo.

=== Sloga Kraljevo ===
In first season playing for Sloga, as a loaned player of Metalac Kraljevo, he played 15 league matches. He scored 6 of 9 total goals for Sloga that spring. He scored two of those 6 goals on home win versus Loznica on 17 May 2009 for league winning.

==== 2009–10 ====
For first season in Serbian First League He played on 21 matches, and scored 4 goals. Two goals scored on home ground, one against Mladost Lučani in match which is won with result 2:1, He scored two of those 6 goals on home win versus Loznica on 17 May 2009 for league winning. and second versus Srem, match ended with result 2:0. Rest two goals he scored on away matches. Sloga lost those matches. That was a bad season for Sloga Kraljevo, because of relegation in Serbian League West after just one season.

==== 2010–11 ====
He made 28 appearances and scored 4 goals in Serbian League West. Also, he played one match in Serbian Cup, against Red Star Belgrade. Sloga lost that match, but with good impressions about game. Previously, he made appearance in cup zero fixture against Radnički Niš. That was a great season for him and Sloga Kraljevo, in which won back in Serbian First League.

==== 2011–12 ====
He participated on 31 league match, and scored 4 goals. Good season for him, he scored some effect goals, and contributed to the team on the way to the top of the table. But, at the end of season, Sloga was 7th on the table, and not promoted in Serbian SuperLiga. He left to Poland, but after a failed engagement, he joined the Sloboda Užice.

=== Sloboda Užice ===
He was licensed for season 2012–13 with jersey #14. He played total 7 league matches for season, but just one time in starting 11.

=== Return to Sloga Kraljevo ===
After season spent in Sloboda Užice, he returned in Sloga. He played 2 games, and he injured after that. He returned for 11th, 12th and 13th fixture, but he renewed injury. He recovered for second half of season, and played on 14 matches. He scored 3 goals on home ground, versus BSK Borča, Radnik Surdulica and Teleoptik.

=== Mačva Šabac ===
For season 2014–15, he joined Mačva Šabac. After first half of season, he left the club.

=== Dinamo Vranje ===
Janićijević joined Dinamo Vranje in summer 2015.

== Career statistics ==
As of 23 January 2016

Club performance			League		Cup		Continental		Total	
Season	Club	League	Apps	Goals	Apps	Goals	Apps	Goals	Apps	Goals
Serbia			League		Serbian Cup		Europe		Total	
2006–07	Metalac Kraljevo	Serbian League West	15	2	0	0	0	0	15	2
2007–08	Metalac Kraljevo	Serbian League West	24	2	0	0	0	0	24	2
2008–09	Metalac Kraljevo	Serbian League West	14	1	0	0	0	0	14	1
2008–09	Sloga Kraljevo	Serbian League West	15	6	0	0	0	0	15	6
2009–10	Sloga Kraljevo	Serbian First League	21	4	0	0	0	0	21	4
2010–11	Sloga Kraljevo	Serbian League West	28	4	2	0	0	0	29	4
2011–12	Sloga Kraljevo	Serbian First League	31	4	0	0	0	0	31	4
2012–13	Sloboda Užice	Serbian SuperLiga	7	0	0	0	0	0	7	0
2013–14	Sloga Kraljevo	Serbian First League	17	3	0	0	0	0	17	3
2014–15	Mačva Šabac	Serbian First League	9	0	0	0	0	0	9	0
2015–16	Dinamo Vranje	Serbian First League	14	0	0	0	0	0	14	0
Total	Serbia		195	26	2	0	0	0	197	26
Career total			195	26	2	0	0	0	197	26
