= Bogdan Milošević =

Serbian footballer

Personal information
- Full name: Bogdan Milošević
- Date of birth: 17 February 1989 (age 37)
- Place of birth: Titovo Užice, SFR Yugoslavia
- Height: 1.87 m (6 ft 2 in)
- Position: Centre back

Team information
- Current team: FAP Priboj

Youth career
- Mladost Lučani

Senior career*
Years	Team	Apps	(Gls)
2007–2012	Mladost Lučani	52	(1)
2008–2009	→ Sloga Požega (loan)	22	(1)
2009–2010	→ Sloga Bajina Bašta (loan)	21	(1)
2012–2014	Napredak Kruševac	40	(3)
2014	→ Tours (loan)	11	(0)
2014–2016	Tours	27	(0)
2015–2016	Tours II	7	(0)
2017–2018	Mladost Lučani	43	(1)
2018–2019	Laval	17	(0)
2019–2022	Mladost Lučani	56	(1)
2022–2023	Zvijezda 09		
2023	Zlatibor Čajetina		
2024	Sloga Bajina Bašta		
2024-	FAP Priboj	22	(0)
- * Club domestic league appearances and goals as of 14 May 2026

Bogdan Milošević (Serbian Cyrillic: Богдан Милошевић; born 17 February 1989) is a Serbian footballer who plays as a defender for Serbian side FAP Priboj.

== Club career ==
Born in Titovo Užice, SFR Yugoslavia, Milošević started his career with Mladost Lučani. He made his senior debut for the club in the Serbian Superliga away match against Hajduk Kula, played on 10 November 2007. After one season with the club in the Serbian First League, Milošević spent two seasons as a loaned player with the Serbian League west clubs Sloga Požega and Sloga Bajina Bašta. Returning in Mladost, Milošević made 31 appearances in all competitions, being a scorer twice time for the 2011–12 season. In summer 2012, Milošević moved to Napredak Kruševac, helping the team to win the Serbian First League for the 2012–13 season and make promotion to the top tier in the Serbian football. In January 2014 Milošević moved on a six-month loan deal to the French side Tours, after which he signed with the club permanently. At the beginning of 2017, Milošević returned to Mladost Lučani. In June 2018, Milošević moved back to France, where he joined Laval.

Ahead of the 2019/20 season, Milošević joined FK Mladost Lučani.

== Career statistics ==
As of 24 June 2018

Appearances and goals by club, season and competition
Club	Season	League			Cup		League Cup		Continental		Other		Total	
Club	Season	Division	Apps	Goals	Apps	Goals	Apps	Goals	Apps	Goals	Apps	Goals	Apps	Goals
Mladost Lučani	2007–08	Serbian SuperLiga	1	0	—		—		—		—		1	0
Mladost Lučani	2008–09	Serbian First League	21	0	—		—		—		—		21	0
Sloga Požega (loan)	2009–10	Serbian League West	22	1	—		—		—		—		22	1
Sloga Bajina Bašta (loan)	2010–11	Serbian League West	21	1	—		—		—		—		21	1
Mladost Lučani	2011–12	Serbian First League	30	1	1	1	—		—		—		31	2
Mladost Lučani	Total		52	1	1	1	—		—		—		53	2
Napredak Kruševac	2012–13	Serbian First League	29	3	1	0	—		—		—		30	3
Napredak Kruševac	2013–14	Serbian SuperLiga	11	0	2	0	—		—		—		13	0
Napredak Kruševac	Total		40	3	3	0	—		—		—		43	3
Tours	2013–14 (loan)	Ligue 2	11	0	—		—		—		—		11	0
Tours	2014–15	Ligue 2	9	0	—		—		—		—		9	0
Tours	2015–16	Ligue 2	12	0	0	0	1	0	—		—		13	0
Tours	2016–17	Ligue 2	6	0	—		0	0	—		—		6	0
Tours	Total		38	0	0	0	1	0	—		—		39	0
Tours II	2014–15	CFA 2	2	0	—		—		—		—		2	0
Tours II	2015–16	CFA 2	3	0	—		—		—		—		3	0
Tours II	2016–17	CFA 2	2	0	—		—		—		—		2	0
Tours II	Total		7	0	—		—		—		—		7	0
Mladost Lučani	2016–17	Serbian SuperLiga	13	0	1	0	—		—		—		14	0
Mladost Lučani	2017–18	Serbian SuperLiga	30	1	5	0	—		2	0	—		37	1
Mladost Lučani	Total		43	1	6	0	—		2	0	—		51	0
Laval	2018–19	Championnat National	0	0	0	0	0	0	—		—		0	0
Career total			223	7	11	0	1	0	2	0	—		236	7

== Honours ==
Napredak Kruševac

- Serbian First League: 2012–13
