= Aleksandar Gojković =

Serbian footballer

Personal information
- Full name: Aleksandar Gojković
- Date of birth: 10 August 1988 (age 38)
- Place of birth: Kraljevo, SFR Yugoslavia
- Height: 1.83 m (6 ft 0 in)
- Positions: Left-back; centre-back

Team information
- Current team: Sloga Kraljevo
- Number: 15

Youth career
- Bubamara 1991
- Sloga Kraljevo

Senior career*
Years	Team	Apps	(Gls)
2005–2011	Sloga Kraljevo	146	(7)
2011–2014	Sloboda Užice	71	(1)
2014–2015	Borac Čačak	25	(0)
2015–2018	Radnik Surdulica	67	(2)
2018–2020	Larissa	23	(0)
2020–2021	Sloga Kraljevo	25	(2)
- * Club domestic league appearances and goals as of 1 July 2021

Aleksandar Gojković (Serbian Cyrillic: Александар Гојковић; born August 18, 1988) is a Serbian professional footballer who last played for Sloga Kraljevo, whom he rejoined from Greek club AEL.

== Career ==
Born in Kraljevo, Gojković made his first football steps with one of the most famous local football schools, Bubamara 1991. Later he moved to Sloga Kraljevo, where he gained fully affirmation, and was captaining the team for some period. During the time he spent with Sloboda Užice, coach Ljubiša Stamenković called him into "Selekcija novinara", football squad made by players from the Serbian SuperLiga competition, for the rival match against Serbia national football team.

== Career statistics ==
As of 31 December 2017

Club	Season	League		Cup		Continental		Total	
Club	Season	Apps	Goals	Apps	Goals	Apps	Goals	Apps	Goals
Sloga	2005–06	24	3	0	0	0	0	24	3
Sloga	2006-07	26	2	0	0	0	0	26	2
Sloga	2007-08	27	1	0	0	0	0	27	1
Sloga	2008-09	23	0	0	0	0	0	23	0
Sloga	2009–10	21	1	0	0	0	0	21	1
Sloga	2010-11	25	0	0	0	0	0	25	0
Sloga	Total	146	7	0	0	0	0	146	7
Sloboda	2011–12	15	0	2	0	0	0	17	0
Sloboda	2012–13	23	1	0	0	0	0	23	1
Sloboda	2013–14	28	0	3	0	0	0	31	0
Sloboda	Total	66	1	5	0	0	0	71	1
Borac Čačak	2014–15	25	0	0	0	0	0	25	0
Borac Čačak	Total	25	0	0	0	0	0	25	0
Radnik Surdulica	2015–16	25	0	1	0	0	0	26	0
Radnik Surdulica	2016–17	26	0	1	0	0	0	27	0
Radnik Surdulica	2017–18	16	2	1	0	0	0	17	2
Radnik Surdulica	Total	67	2	3	0	0	0	70	2
Career totals		304	10	8	0	0	0	312	10

== Honours ==
Sloga Kraljevo

- Serbian League West (1): 2010–11
