= Dušan Mladenović (footballer, born 1990) =

Serbian footballer

Personal information
- Date of birth: 13 October 1990 (age 36)
- Place of birth: Prokuplje, SFR Yugoslavia
- Height: 1.85 m (6 ft 1 in)
- Position: Left back

Team information
- Current team: Prespa Birlik
- Number: 4

Senior career*
Years	Team	Apps	(Gls)
2006–2011	Radnički Niš	24	(1)
2010–2011	→ Žitorađa		
2012	Sinđelić Niš	14	(0)
2012–2013	Sloga Kraljevo	17	(0)
2013	Rudar Prijedor	10	(1)
2014–2015	Alashkert	36	(1)
2015	Željezničar Sarajevo	16	(0)
2016	Iskra Danilovgrad	26	(0)
2017	Dinamo Vranje	12	(0)
2018	Etar Veliko Tarnovo	3	(0)
2018	FK Budućnost Popovac		
2019	FK Tutin		
2019	Prespa Birlik	11	(0)
2021–2024	Žitorađa		
- * Club domestic league appearances and goals as of 4 May 2018

Dušan Mladenović (Serbian Cyrillic: Душан Младеновић; born 13 October 1990) is a Serbian footballer who plays as a defender for Swedish club KSF Prespa Birlik.

== Career ==
In the 2018/19 season, Mladenović played for both FK Budućnost Popovac and FK Tutin. In the summer 2019, Mladenović joined Swedish club KSF Prespa Birlik.
