= Jovica Vasilić =

Serbian footballer

Personal information
- Full name: Jovica Vasilić
- Date of birth: 8 July 1990 (age 36)
- Place of birth: Priboj, SFR Yugoslavia
- Height: 1.84 m (6 ft 1/2 in)
- Position: Right-back

Senior career*
Years	Team	Apps	(Gls)
2007–2012	Sloga Kraljevo	71	(4)
2011	→ Sloboda Užice (loan)	10	(1)
2011–2012	→ Sloboda Užice (loan)	26	(0)
2012–2014	Sloboda Užice	42	(1)
2014–2015	OFK Beograd	23	(0)
2015–2016	Vojvodina	22	(0)
2016–2017	Novi Pazar	36	(1)
2017–2021	Borac Čačak	46	(0)
Total		276	(7)
- * Club domestic league appearances and goals as of 11 July 2022

Jovica Vasilić (Serbian Cyrillic: Јовица Василић; born 8 July 1990) is a Serbian former footballer who played as a right-back.

== Career statistics ==
As of 5 May 2019

Club	Season	League		Cup		Continental		Total	
Club	Season	Apps	Goals	Apps	Goals	Apps	Goals	Apps	Goals
Sloga	2007–08	3	0	0	0	0	0	3	0
Sloga	2008-09	25	2	0	0	0	0	25	2
Sloga	2009–10	29	2	0	0	0	0	29	2
Sloga	2010-11	13	0	0	0	0	0	13	0
Sloga	2011-12	1	0	0	0	0	0	1	0
Sloga	Total	71	4	0	0	0	0	71	4
Sloboda	2010–11 (loan)	10	1	1	0	0	0	11	1
Sloboda	2011–12 (loan)	26	0	2	0	0	0	28	0
Sloboda	2012–13	28	1	1	0	0	0	29	1
Sloboda	2013–14	14	0	2	0	0	0	16	0
Sloboda	Total	78	2	6	0	0	0	84	2
OFK Beograd	2013–14	12	0	1	0	0	0	13	0
OFK Beograd	2014–15	11	0	2	0	0	0	13	0
OFK Beograd	Total	23	0	3	0	0	0	26	0
Vojvodina	2014–15	13	0	0	0	0	0	13	0
Vojvodina	2015–16	9	0	1	0	7	0	17	0
Vojvodina	Total	22	0	1	0	7	0	30	0
Novi Pazar	2015–16	10	1	0	0	0	0	10	1
Novi Pazar	2016–17	26	0	1	0	0	0	27	0
Novi Pazar	Total	36	1	1	0	0	0	37	1
Borac Čačak	2017–18	8	0	1	0	0	0	9	0
Borac Čačak	2018–19	22	0	1	0	0	0	23	0
Borac Čačak	Total	30	0	2	0	0	0	32	0
Career total		260	7	13	0	7	0	280	7
