= Kristijan Tucaković =

Serbian footballer

Personal information
- Full name: Kristijan Tucaković
- Date of birth: 20 November 1975 (age 50)
- Place of birth: Saarbrücken, West Germany
- Height: 1.86 m (6 ft 1 in)
- Position: Defender

Senior career*
Years	Team	Apps	(Gls)
- Javor Ivanjica
- Badnjevac
1997–1998	Sloga Kraljevo		
1998–1999	Bane		
1999–2000	Radnički Niš	45	(2)
2001–2002	Radnički Kragujevac	36	(2)
2002	Radnički Niš	4	(0)
2003–2005	Sutjeska Nikšić	54	(4)
2005–2006	Zemun	30	(1)
2007	Mladenovac	8	(2)
2007–2008	Srem	14	(3)
2008	→ Bežanija (loan)	12	(0)
2008–2009	Inđija	21	(2)
2009	Grafičar Beograd	11	(1)
2010	Seljak Mihajlovac		
2010–2012	Mladenovac	51	(15)
2012	Žarkovo		
2013	Kolubara	14	(1)
- * Club domestic league appearances and goals

Kristijan Tucaković (Serbian Cyrillic: Кристијан Туцаковић; born November 20, 1975) is a Serbian retired footballer.

He had several seasons in the First League of Serbia and Montenegro for Radnički Niš, Radnički Kragujevac, Sutjeska Nikšić and Zemun.
