= Lazar Obradović =

Serbian footballer

Personal information
- Full name: Lazar Obradović
- Date of birth: 5 December 1992 (age 33)
- Place of birth: Čačak, FR Yugoslavia
- Height: 1.84 m (6 ft 0 in)
- Position: Left-back

Youth career
- 2000–2011: Borac Čačak

Senior career*
Years	Team	Apps	(Gls)
2010–2018	Borac Čačak	92	(1)
2011–2012	→ Polet Ljubić (loan)	70	(1)
2018	Tuzla City	0	(0)
2019	Polet Ljubić	13	(0)
2019–2021	Borac Čačak		
- * Club domestic league appearances and goals as of 15:30, 24 December 2019 (UTC)

Lazar Obradović (Serbian Cyrillic: Лазар Обрадовић; born 5 December 1992) is a Serbian footballer who plays as a left-back,

== Career ==
Obradović joined FK Tuzla City in the summer 2018. At the end of 2018, he left the club by mutual consent. He later played for Borac Čačak.
