= Nemanja Miletić (footballer, born January 1991) =

Serbian footballer (born 1991)

Nemanja R. Miletić
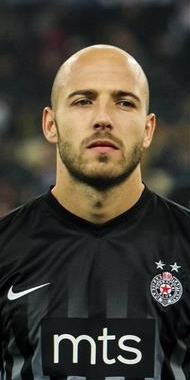
- Miletić with Partizan in 2017

Personal information
- Full name: Nemanja R. Miletić
- Date of birth: 16 January 1991 (age 35)
- Place of birth: Kosovska Mitrovica, SR Serbia, SFR Yugoslavia
- Height: 1.87 m (6 ft 2 in)
- Position: Centre-back

Team information
- Current team: Čukarički
- Number: 73

Youth career
- Bane
- Sloga Kraljevo

Senior career*
Years	Team	Apps	(Gls)
2010–2014	Sloga Kraljevo	113	(3)
2014–2015	Borac Čačak	36	(1)
2016	Vojvodina	16	(1)
2016–2017	Westerlo	20	(0)
2017–2020	Partizan	89	(5)
2020–2021	Al Raed	29	(0)
2021–2022	Partizan	20	(0)
2022–2024	Omonia	43	(2)
2024–2025	Volos	17	(1)
2025–	Čukarički	34	(2)

International career^{‡}
2018–2019	Serbia	3	(0)
- * Club domestic league appearances and goals as of 16 September 2026 ‡ National team caps and goals as of 26 June 2019

Nemanja R. Miletić (Serbian Cyrillic: Немања Р. Милетић; born 16 January 1991) is a Serbian professional footballer who plays as a defender for Čukarički. He operates equally as a centre-back and right-back.

== Club career ==
=== Sloga Kraljevo ===
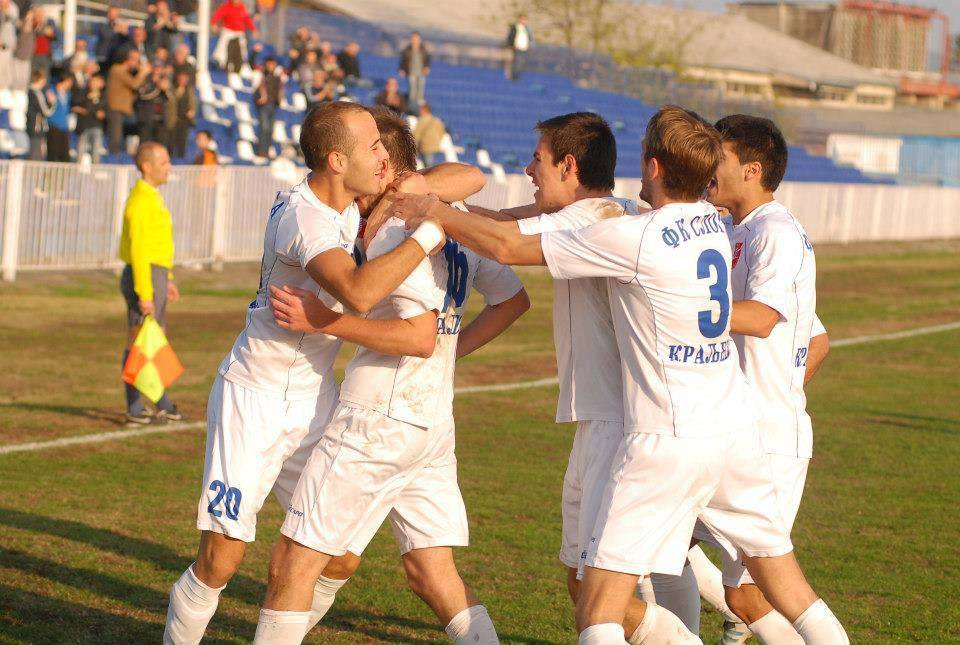
Miletić (first from left) celebrating a goal with his Sloga Kraljevo teammates

Born in Lešak, Miletić started playing football with Bane before moving to Sloga Kraljevo as a teenager. He made his first-team debut in the second half of the 2009–10 Serbian First League, appearing in two games as a substitute, as the club suffered relegation. In the following season, Miletić helped them win the Serbian League West and earn promotion back to the First League. He subsequently established himself as a first-team regular, making close to 100 appearances over the next three seasons (2011–2014).

=== Borac Čačak ===
After a trial with Vojvodina that ended without a contract, Miletić signed with Serbian SuperLiga side Borac Čačak in July 2014. He played mainly as a backup in his debut season, making 16 league appearances and helping the club narrowly avoid relegation. In the following season, Miletić became a first-team regular under manager Nenad Lalatović, helping them to a best-ever start to a league season by placing second after the initial 17 rounds. He, however, sued the club over unpaid wages in late November 2015, alongside few other teammates. They subsequently eliminated league leaders Red Star Belgrade in the Serbian Cup round of 16 with a historic 5–1 away win. In January 2016, Miletić forgave a portion of the debt owed to him and left for Vojvodina.

=== Vojvodina ===
In January 2016, Miletić signed with fellow SuperLiga club Vojvodina until June 2018. He rejoined former manager Lalatović, alongside Dušan Jovančić. Miletić played regularly for the remainder of the season, scoring once in 16 league appearances.

=== Westerlo ===
After featuring regularly for Vojvodina in the opening two months of the season, Miletić was transferred to Belgian club Westerlo in late August 2016. He signed a two-year contract with an option for another year. Throughout the 2016–17 Belgian First Division A, Miletić made 20 appearances but failed to help Westerlo avoid relegation.

=== Partizan ===
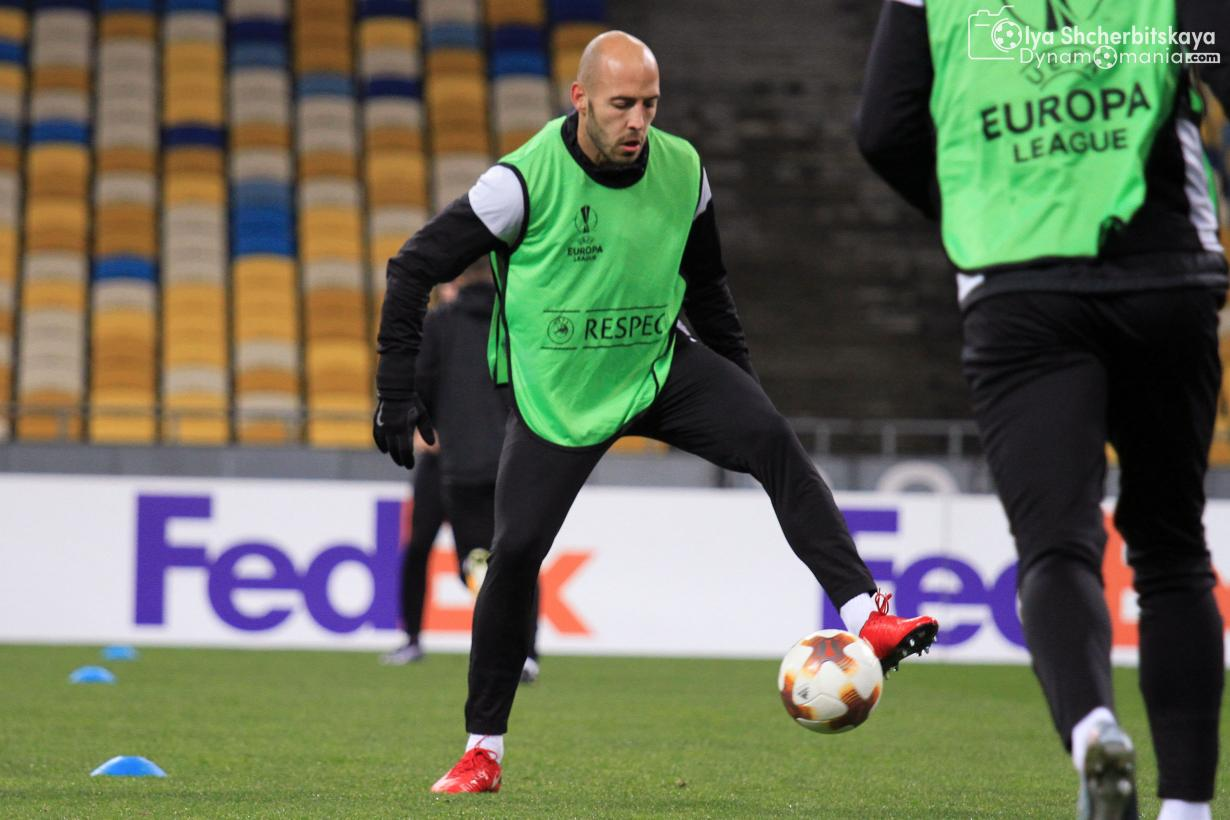
Miletić with Partizan in 2017 before UEFA Europa League match.

==== 2017–18 season ====
In late June 2017, Miletić returned to Serbia and joined Partizan from Westerlo for a transfer fee of €350,000. He signed a three-year contract with the club and chose to wear the number 73 shirt. Miletić made his official debut for Partizan on 22 July, playing the full 90 minutes in the league's opener versus Mačva Šabac and contributing to a 6–1 success at home. He scored his first goal for the club in the Serbian Cup quarter-finals against Javor Ivanjica on 14 March 2018, helping his team to a 2–0 away win, which enabled them to advance to the semi-finals. Partizan would go on to win the competition, beating Mladost Lučani 2–1 in the final.

Miletić finished his debut season as the team's second-most capped player with 50 appearances across all competitions, helping Partizan advance to the UEFA Europa League knockout stage after 13 years. He was also named in the league's best eleven due to his consistent performances in the process.

==== 2018–19 season ====
On 2 August 2018, Miletić scored his first goal in UEFA competitions, equalizing against Lithuanian club Trakai in a 1–1 away draw in the second leg of the Europa League second qualifying round. He also netted the equalizer to set the score at 1–1 in an eventual 3–2 home win over Danish side Nordsjælland two weeks later in the return leg of the third qualifying round. On 30 September, Miletić scored his first league goal for Partizan, netting a late equalizer to make it 2–2 away at Radnički Niš.

On 16 May 2019, Miletić was the only Partizan player named in the league's best eleven for 2018–19.

==== 2019–20 season ====
On 29 August 2019, Miletić played his 100th official game for Partizan. His 80th-minute equalizer against Molde FK helped Partizan reach the group stage of UEFA Europa League for the ninth time.

=== Čukarički ===
On 19 September 2025, Miletić returned to Serbia and signed with Čukarički until the end of the season.

== International career ==
In early October 2018, Serbia manager Mladen Krstajić invited Miletić to the team ahead of their UEFA Nations League games with Montenegro and Romania. He made his international debut in the latter match, coming on as a second-half substitute for Milan Rodić in a goalless draw at Arena Națională. His earned his third and final cap in an October 2019 European Championship qualification match away against Lithuania.

== Career statistics ==
=== Club ===
As of 26 May 2026

Appearances and goals by club, season and competition
Club	Season	League		Cup		Continental		Total	
Club	Season	Apps	Goals	Apps	Goals	Apps	Goals	Apps	Goals
Sloga Kraljevo	2009–10	2	0	—		—		2	0
Sloga Kraljevo	2010–11	22	2	0	0	—		22	2
Sloga Kraljevo	2011–12	31	0	—		—		31	0
Sloga Kraljevo	2012–13	29	0	1	0	—		30	0
Sloga Kraljevo	2013–14	29	1	1	0	—		30	1
Sloga Kraljevo	Total	113	3	2	0	—		115	3
Borac Čačak	2014–15	16	0	1	0	—		17	0
Borac Čačak	2015–16	20	1	2	0	—		22	1
Borac Čačak	Total	36	1	3	0	—		39	1
Vojvodina	2015–16	12	1	1	0	0	0	13	1
Vojvodina	2016–17	4	0	0	0	8	0	12	0
Vojvodina	Total	16	1	1	0	8	0	25	1
Westerlo	2016–17	20	0	0	0	—		20	0
Partizan	2017–18	33	0	6	1	11	0	50	1
Partizan	2018–19	29	3	5	0	7	2	41	5
Partizan	2019–20	23	2	4	0	11	1	38	3
Partizan	2020–21	4	0	0	0	1	0	5	0
Partizan	Total	89	5	15	1	30	3	134	9
Al Raed	2020–21	29	0	1	0	—		30	0
Partizan	2021–22	20	0	5	0	7	0	32	0
Omonia	2022–23	23	1	5	0	8	0	36	1
Omonia	2023–24	20	1	3	0	3	0	26	1
Omonia	Total	43	2	8	0	11	0	62	2
Volos	2024–25	17	1	2	0	—		19	1
Čukarički	2025–26	25	2	0	0	—		25	2
Career total		408	15	37	1	56	3	499	19

=== International ===
Appearances and goals by national team and year
National team	Year	Apps	Goals
Serbia	2018	1	0
Serbia	2019	2	0
Total		3	0

== Honours ==
Sloga Kraljevo

- Serbian League West: 2010–11

Partizan

- Serbian Cup: 2017–18, 2018–19

Omonia

- Cypriot Cup: 2022–23

Individual

- Serbian SuperLiga Team of the Season: 2017–18, 2018–19
