= Jovan Jovanović (footballer) =

Serbian footballer

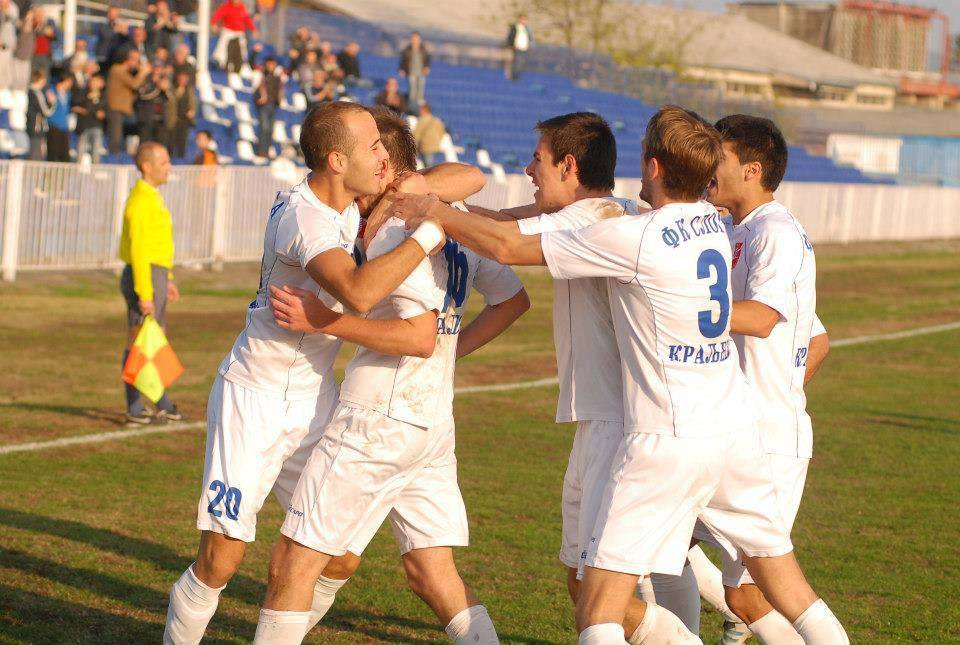
- Jovanović (16) with Sloga Kraljevo

Personal information
- Full name: Jovan Jovanović
- Date of birth: 2 October 1985 (age 41)
- Place of birth: Leskovac, SFR Yugoslavia
- Height: 1.85 m (6 ft 1 in)
- Position: Centre forward

Senior career*
Years	Team	Apps	(Gls)
2002–2004	Dubočica	6	(1)
2004–2006	Budućnost Banatski Dvor	20	(2)
2006–2009	Banat Zrenjanin	0	(0)
2006–2007	→ Spartak Subotica (loan)	24	(5)
2007–2008	→ Radnički Niš (loan)	13	(1)
2008–2009	→ Timok (loan)	–	(–)
2010–2011	Sinđelić Niš	28	(9)
2011–2012	Radnički Niš	17	(5)
2012–2013	Sloga Kraljevo	27	(10)
2013–2018	Radnik Surdulica	95	(19)
2017	→ Novi Pazar (loan)	7	(1)
2019–2020	Kolubara	21	(2)
2020–2022	Dubočica	27	(2)
- * Club domestic league appearances and goals as of 1 July 2022

Jovan Jovanović (Serbian Cyrillic: Јован Јовановић; born 2 October 1985) is a Serbian former footballer who played as a forward. He is nicknamed Zmaj after the Serbian poet Jovan Jovanović Zmaj.

== Honours ==
Radnik Surdulica

- Serbian First League: 2014–15
