= Rašo Babić =

Serbian footballer

Personal information
- Full name: Rašo Babić
- Date of birth: 7 July 1977 (age 49)
- Place of birth: Ratina, SFR Yugoslavia
- Height: 1.83 m (6 ft 0 in)
- Position: Centre-back

Senior career*
Years	Team	Apps	(Gls)
1999–2001	Železničar Lajkovac	40	(0)
2001–2002	Mladost Lučani	28	(1)
2002–2003	Srem	19	(1)
2003–2005	Budućnost Banatski Dvor	36	(0)
2005–2006	Olimpik Baku	21	(0)
2006–2008	Banat Zrenjanin	28	(0)
2008	Atyrau	8	(0)
2008–2009	Megasport	9	(0)
2009–2012	Sloga Kraljevo	73	(0)

Managerial career
- 2012–2014: Sloga Kraljevo (assistant)
- * Club domestic league appearances and goals as of August 1, 2010

Rašo Babić (Serbian Cyrillic: Рашо Бабић, born July 7, 1977) is a Serbian former footballer.

He had played with Serbian clubs FK Polet Ratina, FK Magnohrom, FK Trayal Kruševac, FK Železničar Lajkovac, FK Mladost Lučani, FK Srem, FK Budućnost Banatski Dvor, FK Banat Zrenjanin, FK Sloga Kraljevo, Azerbaijani club FK Olimpik Baku and Kazakh FC Atyrau and FC Megasport.
