= 2008–09 Serbian League West =

Serbian League West
- Season: 2008–09

Serbian League West is a section of the Serbian League, Serbia's third-tier football league. Teams from the western part of Serbia are in this section of the league. The other sections are Serbian League East, Serbian League Vojvodina, and Serbian League Belgrade.

== League table ==
Pos	Team	Pld	W	D	L	GF	GA	GD	Pts	Promotion or relegation
1	Sloga Kraljevo (C, P)	30	17	11	2	43	17	+26	62	Promotion to Serbian First League
2	Radnički Stobex	30	16	5	9	38	28	+10	53	Qualification for promotion play-offs
3	Sloboda Užice	30	14	4	12	35	34	+1	46	
4	Jedinstvo Ub	30	12	6	12	27	29	−2	42	
5	Sloboda Čačak	30	11	8	11	29	34	−5	41	
6	Vujić Voda	30	11	8	11	27	34	−7	41	
7	Sloga Požega	30	11	8	11	34	35	−1	41	
8	Radnički Kragujevac	30	12	5	13	38	28	+10	41	
9	Mačva Šabac	30	11	7	12	30	28	+2	40	
10	Metalac Kraljevo	30	12	4	14	29	31	−2	40	
11	Sloga Petrovac	30	12	4	14	33	41	−8	40	
12	FAP	30	10	9	11	34	46	−12	39	
13	Budućnost Valjevo	30	11	6	13	35	37	−2	39	
14	Železničar Lajkovac	30	10	8	12	38	35	+3	38	
15	INON (R)	30	11	5	14	40	34	+6	38	Relegation to Zone League
16	Loznica (R)	30	8	4	18	20	39	−19	28	Relegation to Zone League

(C) Champions; (P) Promoted; (R) Relegated
