= KSF Prespa Birlik =

- Full name: Kultur- och Sportföreningen; Prespa Birlik
- Founded: 1973
- Ground: Heleneholms IP; Malmö; Sweden
- Capacity: 1,500
Home colours

KSF Prespa Birlik is a Swedish football, culture, and sports association founded in 1973 in Malmö. The football section of the club was dissolved in 2023, but was revived and participated again in the lowest division 2025.

The club was named after the geographical area Prespa. The word "birlik" means unity in Turkish. The football club was founded by ethnic Swedish Turks and Macedonian Turkish born or living in Malmö and the surrounding areas with ancestral roots from the Prespa region in the Former Yugoslavia.

The club plans on bringing back a football section ahead of the 2025 season where they will compete in Division 6 the lowest division of Swedish football. They have brought back former players and now are looking for a place to play as Heleneholm’s IP is already occupied by tenants such as IFK Malmö, Helenehoms SK, and Saba Palestina.

== History ==
=== The Formation of KSF Prespa Birlik ===
The Turks who came to Sweden in the 1960s came as a labor force. In the autumn of 1973, the association was founded. Through many attempts at a start-up, they eventually succeeded in forming a non-political and non-religious association. It became an open association for everyone. The association had many committed members, parents, leaders and young people.

In 1984, with a larger organization and number of members, the association was renamed KSF Prespa Birlik. KSF stands for "Kultur och Sportföreningen Prespa Birlik" in Turkish, which translates to Culture and Sports Association Prespa Unity. This restructuring led to rapid growth and brought the number of members up to 600.

The business flourished rapidly, not least in sports. In addition to the senior team, they formed a B-team and many other youth teams in football, table tennis, billiards, chess and more. Also in the cultural activities, they created folklore groups of different ages, circle courses under the auspices of ABF and discussion forums for integration. The association began to take place in Malmö both in sports and culture, they played football in the then Division 4, they took social responsibility for association members and young people.

Swedish Turks and Macedonian Turkish who came to Sweden had dreams of working hard, saving money, and returning to their homeland. For some, the dream of moving back did not come true. The association believes its community has a much better life in Sweden.

== Club Values ==
=== Youth Development ===
Prespa Birlik believes that young Malmö residents should have the chance to pursue their passion regardless of conditions. The club aim to offer young people in low-resource areas a meaningful leisure time. The club's goal is to promote at least 2-3 players to the senior team each year. In the younger age groups, the individual development and joy of football is at the center with the goal of educating new potential senior team players.

For many young people, football can be a way into society and the association continues to play an active role.

Prespa Birlik currently has four youth teams (U21, U19, U17, and U14) with a total of around 150 young players.

=== Culture ===
Prespa Birlik sees diversity as a strength and has always played an important role in including people from different cultures, or with different backgrounds, and creating common values that the sports movement stands for. The association believes that role will become even more important in the future. The association wants everyone who wants to to be given the opportunity to play football and participate in the association as much and for as long as possible. In addition to the organized football activities, Prespa Birlik has focused on creating new meeting places and a safe environment that means creating a community where ethnicity, background, religion and gender do not matter. It will thus be a job that includes working with issues of values, breaking norms and increasing acceptance and understanding.

KSF Prespa Birlik is thus not just a football club. The association also works to be a positive force in society. The goal is to spread and maintain positive values, counteract violence, racism and exclusion. Community involvement is the association's way of contributing to sustainable development and, through football, uniting people in Malmö.

=== Code of Conduct ===
KSF Prespa Birlik is part of Swedish society and the Swedish sports movement and shares the values that form the basis for sports in Sweden and for society at large. This means that the association:

- Is a democratic and open association where everyone is welcome.
- Protects the laws and rules of society and sports and the goals of the sports movement.
- Wants to awaken and spread the joy of football and sports.
- Cherishes a magnificent setting around the matches with a good atmosphere and a warm and inviting atmosphere for everyone.
- Treats officials, opponents and visiting audiences with kindness and respect.
- Celebrate honest and fair competition and face both defeat and victory in a sporting way.
- Is an integral part of society and a positive social force that works to bring pride and joy to the people of Malmö.
- Cares about young people's social education with a focus on team spirit, community, ability to work together and respect for others.
- Distances ourselves from racism, violence, threats and other forms of verbal, physical, degrading and other attacks on people.
- Pay tribute to the principle of equal value for all and distance ourselves from discrimination.
- Cares about the integration of people with other cultural backgrounds in society.

== Women's Senior Team ==
Prespa Birlik has only one Women's Football Team, playing in Sweden's 4th League.

== Men's Senior Team Season to Season ==
Season	Level	Division	Section	Position	Movements
2006	Tier 8	Division 6	Skåne Sydvästra A	1st	Promoted
2007	Tier 7	Division 5	Skåne Sydvästra	5th	
2008	Tier 7	Division 5	Skåne Sydvästra A	8th	
2009	Tier 7	Division 5	Skåne Sydvästra	6th	
2010	Tier 7	Division 5	Skåne Sydvästra	2nd	Promotion Playoffs
2011	Tier 6	Division 4	Skåne Sydvästra	1st	Promoted
2012	Tier 5	Division 3	Södra Götaland	2nd	Promotion Playoffs
2013	Tier 4	Division 2	Södra Götaland	6th	
2014	Tier 4	Division 2	Östra Götaland	11th	
2015	Tier 4	Division 2	Södra Götaland	1st	Promoted
2016	Tier 3	Division 1	Södra	13th	Relegated
2017	Tier 4	Division 2	Östra Götaland	5th	
2018	Tier 4	Division 2	Västra Götaland	10th	
2019	Tier 4	Division 2	Västra Götaland	10th	
2020	Tier 4	Division 2	Västra Götaland	12th	
2021	Tier 4	Division 2	Södra Götaland		
