= Veljko Dovedan =

Bosnian football manager

Personal information
- Date of birth: 1 June 1954 (age 72)
- Place of birth: Travnik, FPR Yugoslavia

Managerial career
- Years: Team
- 2006: Panachaiki
- 2009: Niki Volos
- 2011: Niki Volos
- 2013–2014: Sloga Kraljevo
- 2014–2015: Sloga Kraljevo
- 2016: Slavija Sarajevo
- 2018–2021: Bylis
- 2022–2023: Apolonia Fier

Veljko Dovedan (born 1 June 1954) is a Bosnian born-Serbian professional football manager.

== Honours ==
=== Manager ===
Bylis

- Kategoria e Parë: 2018–19
