= Boban Dmitrović =

Serbian football manager and player

Personal information
- Full name: Boban Dmitrović
- Date of birth: 2 April 1972 (age 54)
- Place of birth: Kraljevo, SR Serbia, SFR Yugoslavia
- Height: 1.82 m (6 ft 0 in)
- Position: Defender

Youth career
- Budućnost Konarevo
- Sloga Kraljevo

Senior career*
Years	Team	Apps	(Gls)
1993–1996	Rad	83	(4)
1996–2003	Grazer AK	198	(12)
2003–2005	Sturm Graz	52	(0)
2005–2011	Borac Čačak	155	(10)
2011–2012	Sloga Kraljevo	32	(9)
Total		520	(35)

International career
2001–2003	FR Yugoslavia / Serbia and Montenegro	13	(0)

Managerial career
- 2017–2018: Radnički Niš (assistant)
- 2018: Radnički Niš
- 2020–2022: Karađorđe Ribnica
- * Club domestic league appearances and goals

Boban Dmitrović (Serbian Cyrillic: Бобан Дмитровић; born 2 April 1972) is a Serbian football manager and former player.

== Club career ==
Born in Konarevo, a village near Kraljevo, Dmitrović started out at local club Budućnost Konarevo, before joining Sloga Kraljevo. He made his First League of FR Yugoslavia debut with Rad in the 1993–94 season. In the summer of 1996, Dmitrović moved to Austria to play for Grazer AK. He spent seven seasons with the club, making 198 appearances and scoring 12 goals in the Austrian Bundesliga. In May 2003, Dmitrović signed with GAK's crosstown rivals Sturm Graz, penning a two-year contract. He ended up playing 52 league games for the club.

In the summer of 2005, Dmitrović returned to his homeland and signed with Borac Čačak. He led them as captain to a fourth-place finish in the 2007–08 season, as the club gained a spot in UEFA competitions for the first time in history. In early 2011, after a dispute with the club's management, Dmitrović left the team after almost six years and 155 matches played in the top flight.

In the summer of 2011, Dmitrović returned to Sloga Kraljevo after almost two decades, following the club's promotion to the Serbian First League. He retired from professional football in the summer of 2012.

== International career ==
In June 2001, Dmitrović made his national team debut in a 1–1 draw against Russia, aged 29. He was capped 13 times for Serbia and Montenegro between 2001 and 2003, under the managerial reign of Dejan Savićević.

== Managerial career ==
After serving as an assistant to Peter Pacult, Ivan Jević and Milan Đuričić, Dmitrović was appointed manager of Radnički Niš in January 2018. He left the position just two months later after suffering two consecutive losses.

== Personal life ==
Dmitrović is the father of fellow footballer Filip Dmitrović.

== Career statistics ==
=== Club ===
Club	Season	League	
Club	Season	Apps	Goals
Rad	1993–94	23	0
Rad	1994–95	29	0
Rad	1995–96	31	4
Rad	Total	83	4
Grazer AK	1996–97	33	3
Grazer AK	1997–98	22	2
Grazer AK	1998–99	32	4
Grazer AK	1999–2000	20	2
Grazer AK	2000–01	34	0
Grazer AK	2001–02	32	1
Grazer AK	2002–03	25	0
Grazer AK	Total	198	12
Sturm Graz	2003–04	31	0
Sturm Graz	2004–05	21	0
Sturm Graz	Total	52	0
Borac Čačak	2005–06	27	3
Borac Čačak	2006–07	28	0
Borac Čačak	2007–08	29	3
Borac Čačak	2008–09	29	0
Borac Čačak	2009–10	28	3
Borac Čačak	2010–11	14	1
Borac Čačak	Total	155	10
Sloga Kraljevo	2011–12	32	9
Sloga Kraljevo	Total	32	9
Career total		520	35

=== International ===
National team	Year	Apps	Goals
FR Yugoslavia	2001	6	0
FR Yugoslavia	2002	5	0
Serbia and Montenegro	2003	2	0
Total		13	0

== Honours ==
Grazer AK

- Austrian Cup: 1999–2000, 2001–02
- Austrian Supercup: 2000, 2002

Individual

- Serbian SuperLiga Team of the Season: 2008–09
