= 2009–10 Serbian First League =

Serbian First League
- Season: 2009–10
- Champions: Inđija
- Promoted: Inđija; Sevojno
- Relegated: Radnički Niš; Sloga Kraljevo; ČSK; Mladost Apatin
- Matches: 306
- Goals: 620 (2.03 per match)

The Serbian First Football League (Serbian: Prva liga Srbije) is the second-highest football league in Serbia. The league is operated by the Serbian FA. 18 teams will compete in this league for the 2009–10 season. Two teams will be promoted to the Serbian Superliga and four will be relegated to the Serbian League, the third-highest division overall in the Serbian football league system.

== League table ==
| Pos | Team | Pld | W | D | L | GF | GA | GD | Pts | Promotion or relegation |
|---|---|---|---|---|---|---|---|---|---|---|
| 1 | Inđija (C, P) | 34 | 17 | 9 | 8 | 47 | 26 | +21 | 60 | Promotion to Serbian SuperLiga |
| 2 | Sevojno (P) | 34 | 17 | 7 | 10 | 40 | 24 | +16 | 58 | Promotion to Serbian SuperLiga |
| 3 | Kolubara | 34 | 14 | 14 | 6 | 37 | 31 | +6 | 56 | |
| 4 | Bežanija | 34 | 14 | 11 | 9 | 34 | 28 | +6 | 53 | |
| 5 | Novi Sad | 34 | 14 | 9 | 11 | 34 | 29 | +5 | 51 | |
| 6 | Teleoptik | 34 | 14 | 8 | 12 | 38 | 31 | +7 | 50 | |
| 7 | Proleter Novi Sad | 34 | 13 | 7 | 14 | 41 | 35 | +6 | 46 | |
| 8 | Srem | 34 | 12 | 10 | 12 | 34 | 37 | −3 | 46 | |
| 9 | Novi Pazar | 34 | 13 | 7 | 14 | 33 | 38 | −5 | 46 | |
| 10 | Banat Zrenjanin | 34 | 11 | 12 | 11 | 31 | 28 | +3 | 45 | |
| 11 | Radnički Sombor | 34 | 12 | 9 | 13 | 30 | 32 | −2 | 45 | |
| 12 | Zemun (Note: 2 points deducted) | 34 | 11 | 12 | 11 | 39 | 36 | +3 | 43 | |
| 13 | Dinamo Vranje | 34 | 12 | 7 | 15 | 32 | 38 | −6 | 43 | |
| 14 | Mladost Lučani | 34 | 9 | 15 | 10 | 33 | 31 | +2 | 42 | |
| 15 | Radnički Niš (R) | 34 | 9 | 14 | 11 | 33 | 35 | −2 | 41 | Relegation to Serbian League |
| 16 | Sloga Kraljevo (R) | 34 | 9 | 12 | 13 | 28 | 32 | −4 | 39 | Relegation to Serbian League |
| 17 | ČSK Čelarevo (R) | 34 | 6 | 14 | 14 | 32 | 48 | −16 | 32 | Relegation to Serbian League |
| 18 | Mladost Apatin (R) | 34 | 7 | 7 | 20 | 24 | 61 | −37 | 28 | Relegation to Serbian League |

(C) Champions; (P) Promoted; (R) Relegated

== Results ==
| Home \ Away | ČSK | BAN | BEŽ | DVR | INĐ | KOL | MAP | MLA | NPZ | NSD | PNS | RNI | RSO | SEV | SKR | SRM | TLO | ZEM |
|---|---|---|---|---|---|---|---|---|---|---|---|---|---|---|---|---|---|---|
| ČSK Čelarevo | | 0–0 | 3–1 | 4–3 | 0–1 | 2–2 | 0–0 | 2–1 | 2–2 | 0–0 | 0–1 | 1–1 | 0–3 | 1–0 | 0–0 | 1–3 | 2–0 | 1–1 |
| Banat Zrenjanin | 1–1 | | 0–1 | 1–0 | 1–1 | 1–1 | 5–1 | 1–1 | 3–1 | 2–0 | 2–1 | 1–3 | 1–2 | 0–1 | 2–1 | 1–0 | 0–3 | 1–0 |
| Bežanija | 1–1 | 0–0 | | 3–1 | 0–0 | 1–0 | 2–0 | 0–1 | 0–0 | 1–0 | 3–0 | 3–0 | 1–0 | 0–1 | 1–1 | 2–0 | 3–1 | 2–1 |
| Dinamo Vranje | 0–1 | 0–0 | 1–1 | | 0–0 | 0–0 | 2–1 | 2–1 | 1–0 | 3–2 | 1–0 | 2–0 | 2–0 | 0–1 | 1–0 | 4–0 | 2–1 | 0–0 |
| Inđija | 4–0 | 1–0 | 1–2 | 4–0 | | 1–1 | 4–0 | 2–1 | 2–1 | 0–1 | 3–2 | 1–0 | 3–0 | 1–1 | 2–0 | 0–1 | 2–0 | 2–1 |
| Kolubara | 1–1 | 1–1 | 2–0 | 2–1 | 2–0 | | 0–0 | 1–1 | 1–0 | 0–1 | 1–0 | 1–0 | 2–1 | 0–0 | 2–1 | 2–2 | 0–3 | 2–1 |
| Mladost Apatin | 1–1 | 0–3 | 1–0 | 1–2 | 0–2 | 0–2 | | 1–0 | 2–3 | 0–2 | 1–1 | 2–0 | 0–2 | 2–0 | 1–1 | 1–3 | 1–0 | 0–3 |
| Mladost Lučani | 2–2 | 1–0 | 1–1 | 0–0 | 2–0 | 0–1 | 3–0 | | 4–1 | 3–1 | 1–0 | 0–0 | 3–1 | 0–1 | 0–0 | 1–1 | 1–0 | 0–0 |
| Novi Pazar | 1–0 | 1–0 | 1–2 | 1–0 | 1–1 | 1–1 | 3–1 | 0–0 | | 1–0 | 0–0 | 1–2 | 1–0 | 1–0 | 1–0 | 0–1 | 2–1 | 1–1 |
| Novi Sad | 1–0 | 0–0 | 0–0 | 1–0 | 1–0 | 0–2 | 3–1 | 1–1 | 3–0 | | 1–0 | 0–0 | 1–1 | 0–2 | 1–0 | 2–1 | 0–1 | 4–0 |
| Proleter Novi Sad | 5–2 | 3–1 | 0–1 | 2–0 | 1–0 | 1–2 | 3–1 | 3–1 | 1–0 | 0–0 | | 2–1 | 0–0 | 0–1 | 0–0 | 1–2 | 1–2 | 3–0 |
| Radnički Niš | 3–1 | 0–1 | 0–0 | 1–0 | 0–0 | 1–1 | 2–0 | 3–1 | 1–2 | 1–2 | 1–1 | | 1–0 | 3–0 | 0–0 | 0–1 | 1–4 | 1–0 |
| Radnički Sombor | 1–0 | 0–0 | 0–0 | 2–1 | 0–1 | 2–0 | 1–3 | 0–0 | 2–1 | 2–1 | 0–2 | 1–1 | | 0–0 | 2–1 | 1–1 | 1–0 | 1–0 |
| Sevojno | 2–1 | 0–0 | 5–1 | 1–2 | 1–1 | 2–0 | 4–0 | 0–0 | 2–0 | 1–0 | 1–2 | 1–1 | 1–0 | | 4–1 | 1–0 | 0–1 | 3–0 |
| Sloga Kraljevo | 2–0 | 1–0 | 3–0 | 0–0 | 1–2 | 1–2 | 0–0 | 2–1 | 2–1 | 1–2 | 0–0 | 2–2 | 2–1 | 1–0 | | 2–0 | 2–0 | 0–0 |
| Srem | 0–0 | 0–1 | 1–0 | 3–0 | 1–2 | 3–0 | 0–0 | 0–0 | 0–3 | 1–1 | 0–3 | 1–1 | 2–0 | 2–1 | 2–0 | | 0–3 | 1–1 |
| Teleoptik | 2–1 | 1–0 | 1–1 | 2–1 | 3–2 | 0–0 | 0–1 | 1–1 | 2–0 | 2–2 | 2–0 | 1–1 | 0–0 | 0–2 | 0–0 | 1–0 | | 0–0 |
| Zemun | 2–1 | 1–1 | 1–0 | 2–0 | 1–1 | 2–2 | 4–1 | 3–0 | 0–1 | 2–0 | 4–2 | 1–1 | 0–3 | 3–0 | 2–0 | 1–1 | 1–0 | |

Legend: Blue = home team win; Yellow = draw; Red = away team win.

== See also ==
- List of football clubs in Serbia
- Serbian First League
