= 2010–11 Serbian League West =

Serbian League West
- Season: 2010–11

The Serbian League West is a section of the Serbian League, Serbia's third football league. Teams from the western part of Serbia are in this section of the league. The other sections are Serbian League East, Serbian League Vojvodina, and Serbian League Belgrade.

== Teams ==
The following teams participated in the Serbian League West in 2010–11:

- FK Budućnost Valjevo
- FK FAP
- FK Jedinstvo Ub
- FK Mačva Šabac
- FK Polet Ljubić
- FK Partizan Bumbarevo Brdo
- FK Radnički Stobex
- FK Rudar Kostolac
- FK Sloboda Čačak
- FK Sloga Bajina Bašta
- FK Sloga Kraljevo
- FK Sloga Petrovac
- FK Sloga Požega
- FK Šumadija Aranđelovac
- FK Vujić Voda
- FK Železničar Lajkovac

== League table ==
Pos	Team	Pld	W	D	L	GF	GA	GD	Pts	Promotion or relegation
1	Sloga Kraljevo (C, P)	30	18	7	5	36	20	+16	61	Promotion to Serbian First League
2	Sloga Bajina Bašta	30	16	9	5	49	18	+31	57	
3	Partizan Bumbarevo Brdo	30	14	6	10	38	31	+7	48	
4	Radnicki Stobex	30	14	4	12	41	36	+5	46	
5	Rudar Kostolac	30	13	6	11	36	33	+3	45	
6	Macva Šabac	30	11	9	10	44	27	+17	42	
7	Vujić Voda	30	13	3	14	28	36	−8	42	
8	Sloga Petrovac	30	11	8	11	34	33	+1	41	
9	Šumadija Aranđelovac	30	11	6	13	37	45	−8	39	
10	Železničar Lajkovac	30	9	11	10	33	29	+4	38	
11	Jedinstvo Ub	30	10	7	13	34	41	−7	37	
12	Sloga Požega	30	10	7	13	31	43	−12	37	
13	Polet Ljubić	30	10	7	13	30	48	−18	37	
14	Sloboda Čačak	30	9	9	12	31	34	−3	36	
15	FAP (R)	30	9	6	15	25	39	−14	33	Relegation to Zone League
16	Budućnost Valjevo (R)	30	8	3	19	21	35	−14	27	Relegation to Zone League

(C) Champions; (P) Promoted; (R) Relegated
