= 2013–14 Serbian First League =

Serbian First League
- Season: 2013–14
- Matches played: 240
- Goals scored: 530 (2.21 per match)
- Top goalscorer: Predrag Živadinović (Mladost), 15 goals
- Biggest home win: Metalac 5–0 BSK (21 September 2013)
- Biggest away win: Inđija 1–5 Proleter (29 September 2013); Timok 0–4 Teleoptik (8 March 2014)
- Highest scoring: Proleter 3–4 Sloga Petrovac (21 September 2013); Sinđelić 4–3 Smederevo (28 May 2014)

The Serbian First League (Serbian: Prva liga Srbije) is the second-highest football league in Serbia. The league is operated by the Serbian FA. Sixteen teams competed in this league for the 2013–14 season. Two teams were promoted to the Serbian Superliga while the 3rd placed team played in the play-offs against the 14th team in the Super liga for the first time. Four teams were relegated to the Serbian League, the third-highest division overall in the Serbian football league system. The season began in August 2013 and ended in June 2014.

== 2013–14 teams ==
Location of teams in the 2013–14 Serbian First league

Team	City	Stadium	Capacity	Kit Makers	Sponsors
Bežanija	Belgrade	Stadion FK Bežanija	5,000	Kappa	Sto Posto
Borac	Čačak	Čačak Stadium	5,000	NAAI	Auto Čačak
BSK	Belgrade	Vizelj Park	2,500	Hummel	Đak Sport
Dolina Padina	Padina	Stadion FK Dolina	1,000	Bull	Agrolazar
Inđija	Inđija	Stadion FK Inđija	4,500	Joma	Agrounija
Jedinstvo Užice	Užice	Stadion Krčagovo	1,500	Nike	Putevi Užice
Metalac	Gornji Milanovac	Stadion Metalac	4,400	Nike	Metalac a.d.
Mladost	Lučani	Stadion FK Mladost	8,000	Nike	
Proleter	Novi Sad	Stadion Slana Bara	2,000	NAAI	JP Gas Novi Sad
Radnik	Surdulica	Surdulica City Stadium	3,500	Legea	
Sinđelić	Belgrade	Stadion FK Sinđelić	1,500	Cvetex	Rubikon Shipping Company
Sloga Kraljevo	Kraljevo	Kraljevo City Stadium	5,000	DaCapo	
Sloga Petrovac	Petrovac	Stadion FK Sloga	2,000	Joma	
Smederevo	Smederevo	Smederevo Stadium	19,200	NAAI	City of Smederevo
Teleoptik	Zemun	SC Partizan-Teleoptik	5,000	Adidas	
Timok	Zaječar	Zaječar City Stadium	9,000	Joma	Zaječarsko / City of Zaječar

=== Hajduk Kula liquidation ===
In July Serbian SuperLiga club Hajduk Kula went defunct thus leaving an empty place in 2013–14 Serbian SuperLiga. On an urgent meeting in Football Association of Serbia, it was ruled that 3rd placed team from 2012–13 Serbian First League should be promoted to Serbian SuperLiga. It was also announced that, due to shortage of time until the beginning of the season, 13th placed team from last season is going to stay in the league for the current season. Formally, that meant that Voždovac was promoted and Teleoptik stayed in the league.

== League table ==
Pos	Team	Pld	W	D	L	GF	GA	GD	Pts	Promotion or relegation
1	Mladost Lučani (C, P)	30	18	6	6	42	20	+22	60	Promotion to Serbian SuperLiga
2	Borac Čačak (P)	30	15	7	8	28	19	+9	52 (Note: MET 0-1 BOR; BOR 0-0 MET)	Promotion to Serbian SuperLiga
3	Metalac Gornji Milanovac	30	15	7	8	34	14	+20	52	Qualification for promotion play-off
4	Bežanija	30	11	12	7	34	26	+8	45	
5	BSK Borča	30	12	7	11	37	39	−2	43	
6	Sloga Petrovac	30	12	7	11	35	40	−5	43	
7	Sloga Kraljevo	30	12	6	12	35	31	+4	42	
8	Jedinstvo Užice	30	11	8	11	30	37	−7	41	
9	Proleter Novi Sad	30	10	9	11	42	36	+6	39	
10	Radnik Surdulica	30	10	8	12	31	36	−5	38	
11	Sinđelić Beograd	30	10	7	13	32	36	−4	37	
12	Inđija	30	10	7	13	32	41	−9	37	
13	Timok (R)	30	8	10	12	26	35	−9	34	Relegation to Serbian League
14	Dolina Padina (R)	30	9	7	14	31	42	−11	34	Relegation to Serbian League
15	Teleoptik (R)	30	8	7	15	35	40	−5	31	Relegation to Serbian League
16	Smederevo (R)	30	8	7	15	26	38	−12	31	Relegation to Serbian League

Source: fss.rs
Rules for classification: 1) points; 2) head-to-head points; 3) head-to-head goal difference; 4) head-to-head goals scored; 5) goal difference; 6) number of goals scored.
(C) Champions; (P) Promoted; (R) Relegated

== Results ==
Home \ Away	BEŽ	BOR	BSK	DOL	INĐ	JPU	MET	MLA	PNS	RSU	SIN	SKR	SPM	SME	TLO	TMK
Bežanija		2–2	4–0	2–0	0–0	2–0	0–0	1–1	2–1	1–0	1–0	3–1	0–1	2–0	0–0	1–1
Borac Čačak	1–0		2–0	1–0	1–0	2–0	0–0	0–1	2–0	1–3	1–2	2–0	0–1	1–0	2–0	2–1
BSK Borča	1–0	1–0		1–0	1–1	1–0	1–0	1–2	2–1	3–0	1–1	1–1	5–1	2–4	2–0	2–0
Dolina Padina	1–1	0–1	2–3		3–2	2–2	1–0	1–3	2–1	2–0	2–1	0–0	3–2	0–0	2–0	1–1
Inđija	2–1	0–0	1–0	1–1		3–1	0–1	2–1	1–5	1–1	0–0	1–0	3–0	4–1	1–2	1–0
Jedinstvo Užice	0–0	1–2	1–1	3–1	1–0		0–1	0–2	1–1	1–0	2–1	3–1	2–0	1–0	2–1	2–1
Metalac Gornji Milanovac	3–0	0–1	5–0	0–0	3–0	2–0		0–2	1–1	3–0	2–0	3–0	3–1	1–0	1–0	2–1
Mladost Lučani	1–1	2–0	1–0	2–1	2–0	4–1	0–0		1–1	1–2	4–0	1–1	1–0	1–0	2–1	3–0
Proleter Novi Sad	0–0	1–0	2–2	1–0	3–1	2–2	0–1	2–0		4–0	2–1	2–1	3–4	1–1	2–0	2–1
Radnik Surdulica	0–0	0–0	0–0	0–1	4–1	3–0	1–1	0–1	1–0		3–0	2–1	2–1	1–2	3–0	1–1
Sinđelić Beograd	0–1	0–1	2–0	4–0	0–0	0–0	2–0	1–0	1–1	1–2		2–1	2–0	4–3	2–0	0–3
Sloga Kraljevo	3–0	0–1	4–1	1–2	4–2	1–1	1–0	1–0	3–1	1–0	1–0		1–1	1–0	1–0	3–0
Sloga Petrovac	2–0	1–1	1–0	1–0	2–0	1–1	0–0	2–0	1–0	1–1	2–0	0–2		1–0	3–3	2–0
Smederevo	2–4	0–0	0–3	3–1	1–2	0–1	1–0	0–1	2–1	1–1	0–2	1–0	2–1		0–0	0–0
Teleoptik	2–4	1–1	0–0	3–2	1–2	2–0	0–1	1–2	1–1	4–0	2–2	1–0	4–1	0–1		2–0
Timok	1–1	2–0	3–2	2–0	1–0	0–1	1–0	0–0	1–0	2–0	1–1	0–0	1–1	1–1	0–4	

Source: Prva liga
Legend: Blue = home team win; Yellow = draw; Red = away team win.

== Top goalscorers ==
Source: Prva liga official website

Pos	Scorer	Team	Goals
1	(Serbia) Predrag Živadinović	Mladost	15
2	(Serbia) Branko Mihajlović	Sinđelić	14
3	(Serbia) Srđan Vujaklija	Proleter	12
4	(Serbia) Darko Lemajić	Inđija	9
5	(Serbia) Milan Stojanović	Sloga Petrovac	8
5	(Serbia) Marko S. Jakšić	Timok / Bežanija	8
7	(Serbia) Nikola Ćirković	Metalac	7
7	(Serbia) Danilo Kovačević	Dolina / Mladost	7
7	(Serbia) Aleksandar Leposavić	Jedinstvo	7
7	(Serbia) Zoran Marušić	Sloga Kraljevo	7

^{* Club name in italic indicates player's former club.}

=== Hat-tricks ===
Player	For	Against	Result	Date
(Serbia) Zoran Marušić	Sloga Kraljevo	Inđija	4–2	21 September 2013
(Serbia) Nikola Ćirković	Metalac	BSK	5–0	21 September 2013
(Montenegro) Bojan Božović	Bežanija	BSK	4–0	26 October 2013
(Bosnia and Herzegovina) Momčilo Mrkaić	BSK	Smederevo	3–0	25 May 2014
(Bosnia and Herzegovina) Marko Mitrušić	Bežanija	Teleoptik	4–2	28 May 2014
(Serbia) Branko Mihajlović	Sinđelić	Smederevo	4–3	28 May 2014
