= 2011–12 Serbian First League =

Serbian First League
- Season: 2011–12
- Champions: Radnički Niš
- Promoted: Radnički Niš; Donji Srem
- Relegated: Radnički Sombor; Mladi Radnik; Sinđelić Niš; Srem
- Matches played: 306
- Goals scored: 645 (2.11 per match)
- Top goalscorer: Ivan Pejčić (13 goals)
- Biggest home win: Radnički Niš 6–0 Srem (23 May 2012)
- Biggest away win: Srem 0–5 Teleoptik (26 May 2012)
- Highest scoring: Mladi Radnik 7–2 Srem (2 June 2012)

The 2011–12 Serbian First League was the seventh season of the league under its current name. It started on 13 August 2011 and concluded on 6 June 2012.

Radnički Niš won the title and Donji Srem finished as runners-up, with both clubs earning promotion to the Serbian SuperLiga.

Radnički Sombor, Mladi Radnik, Sinđelić Niš and Srem were relegated to their respective Serbian League groups.

== 2011–12 teams ==
Location of teams in the 2011–12 Serbian First league

Team	City	Stadium	Capacity
Banat	Zrenjanin	Stadion Karađorđev park	13,000
Bežanija	Belgrade	Bežanija Stadium	5,000
Čukarički	Belgrade	Čukarički Stadium	7,000
Donji Srem	Pećinci	Suvača Sportcenter	1,500
Inđija	Inđija	Inđija Stadium	4,500
Kolubara	Lazarevac	Kolubara Stadium	2,000
Mladenovac	Mladenovac	Stadion Selters	4,000
Mladi Radnik	Požarevac	Vašarište	3,200
Mladost	Lučani	Mladost Stadium	8,000
Napredak	Kruševac	Mladost Stadium	10,811
Novi Sad	Novi Sad	Stadion Detelinara	5,000
Proleter	Novi Sad	Stadion Slana Bara	2,000
Radnički	Niš	Čair Stadium	14,000
Radnički	Sombor	City Stadium	1,500
Sinđelić	Niš	Mašinac Stadium	5,000
Sloga	Kraljevo	City Stadium	5,000
Srem	Sremska Mitrovica	Stadion Promenada	5,000
Teleoptik	Zemun	SC Partizan-Teleoptik	5,000

== League table ==
Pos	Team	Pld	W	D	L	GF	GA	GD	Pts	Promotion or relegation
1	Radnički Niš (C, P)	34	20	7	7	52	28	+24	67	Promotion to Serbian SuperLiga
2	Donji Srem (P)	34	16	13	5	34	15	+19	61	Promotion to Serbian SuperLiga
3	Mladost Lučani	34	13	14	7	42	27	+15	53	
4	Bežanija	34	11	19	4	33	15	+18	52	
5	Inđija	34	14	10	10	35	32	+3	52	
6	Napredak Kruševac	34	13	12	9	39	29	+10	51	
7	Sloga Kraljevo	34	14	8	12	33	33	0	50	
8	Teleoptik	34	12	13	9	45	26	+19	49	
9	Proleter Novi Sad	34	14	7	13	33	34	−1	49	
10	Novi Sad	34	11	10	13	37	42	−5	43	
11	Mladenovac	34	11	10	13	46	52	−6	43	
12	Kolubara	34	12	7	15	35	43	−8	43	
13	Čukarički	34	10	11	13	31	39	−8	41 (Note: ČUK: 8pts.; BAN: 5pts.; RDS: 3pts.)	
14	Banat Zrenjanin	34	9	14	11	35	41	−6	41	
15	Radnički Sombor (R)	34	11	8	15	25	34	−9	41	Relegation to Serbian League
16	Mladi Radnik (R)	34	9	9	16	29	38	−9	36	Relegation to Serbian League
17	Sinđelić Niš (R)	34	7	10	17	34	50	−16	31	Relegation to Serbian League
18	Srem (R)	34	4	8	22	27	67	−40	20	Relegation to Serbian League

Source: srbijasport.net
Rules for classification: 1) points; 2) head-to-head points; 3) head-to-head goal difference; 4) head-to-head goals scored; 5) goal difference; 6) number of goals scored.
(C) Champions; (P) Promoted; (R) Relegated

== Results ==
Home \ Away	BAN	BEŽ	ČUK	DSR	INĐ	KOL	MLD	MLR	MLA	NAP	NSD	PNS	RNI	RSO	SNI	SKR	SRM	TLO
Banat Zrenjanin		0–1	0–0	1–1	1–1	3–1	3–3	0–1	4–4	1–0	1–1	1–2	1–0	1–0	0–0	0–1	1–0	0–0
Bežanija	0–0		2–2	0–0	1–0	3–0	5–1	0–0	1–1	0–1	2–0	0–0	0–0	2–0	2–1	2–0	0–0	0–0
Čukarički	1–1	0–0		0–1	1–2	0–3	2–0	2–0	0–0	1–0	3–0	0–0	2–2	2–1	0–0	1–0	0–0	0–3
Donji Srem	0–0	0–0	1–1		1–0	3–0	0–1	2–0	1–1	1–0	2–0	3–1	0–0	1–0	5–1	2–2	2–1	1–0
Inđija	2–2	0–0	1–0	0–0		1–3	2–1	1–0	0–2	2–2	1–0	0–1	2–1	2–0	1–0	3–1	2–1	1–1
Kolubara	5–3	0–0	1–3	0–1	2–2		1–0	1–0	0–0	2–0	1–2	2–0	0–1	2–0	1–0	1–0	0–2	1–1
Mladenovac	0–1	0–0	3–2	0–1	2–1	0–0		2–1	0–0	3–2	3–4	2–1	2–1	2–0	3–1	1–2	2–0	1–1
Mladi Radnik	2–0	0–1	0–0	0–1	0–2	0–0	0–0		0–0	2–0	2–0	1–0	0–2	1–0	2–2	1–3	7–2	2–1
Mladost Lučani	1–0	0–1	1–0	1–0	0–2	6–2	1–1	3–0		1–2	0–0	0–1	2–3	1–1	1–0	0–0	1–0	1–0
Napredak Kruševac	3–1	1–1	1–0	1–0	2–1	3–1	1–1	0–0	1–1		0–0	5–1	0–0	3–0	2–0	2–0	3–0	1–0
Novi Sad	0–1	0–0	5–3	0–1	3–1	0–1	2–1	1–1	1–1	2–2		0–0	1–0	3–2	2–1	2–1	2–1	1–1
Proleter Novi Sad	2–2	1–0	2–0	2–1	0–0	0–0	3–1	0–2	2–1	2–0	1–0		1–2	0–1	1–0	2–1	1–2	0–0
Radnički Niš	2–3	1–0	2–0	1–0	2–0	2–1	3–3	2–0	1–1	1–0	1–0	1–0		1–0	2–1	2–0	6–0	1–0
Radnički Sombor	4–1	0–0	0–1	0–1	0–1	1–0	2–1	3–2	2–1	0–0	0–0	1–0	1–0		0–0	1–0	2–2	1–0
Sinđelić Niš	1–3	2–1	5–1	0–0	2–0	1–0	2–1	0–0	0–3	1–1	3–2	2–2	2–4	0–0		2–0	1–1	0–2
Sloga Kraljevo	1–1	0–0	1–2	0–0	0–0	2–0	3–0	2–1	0–3	0–0	2–1	1–0	1–0	2–0	1–0		2–1	1–0
Srem	0–0	0–4	0–1	1–1	0–1	0–3	2–2	2–1	1–2	0–0	0–1	1–3	0–1	1–2	3–2	2–3		0–5
Teleoptik	1–0	3–3	1–0	0–0	0–0	3–0	2–3	3–0	0–1	3–0	2–1	2–0	4–4	0–0	3–1	0–0	3–1	

Source: srbijasport.net
Legend: Blue = home team win; Yellow = draw; Red = away team win.

== Top scorers ==
Pos	Scorer	Team	Goals
1	(Serbia) Ivan Pejčić	Radnički Niš	13
2	(Serbia) Nenad Mirosavljević	Napredak Kruševac	11
3	(Serbia) Srđan Dimitrov	Inđija	10
3	(Serbia) Miloš Jojić	Teleoptik	10
3	(Serbia) Miša Petković	Donji Srem	10
3	(Serbia) Kristijan Tucaković	Mladenovac	10
7	(Serbia) Milan Čokić	Mladenovac	9
7	(Serbia) Boban Dmitrović	Sloga Kraljevo	9
7	(Serbia) Marko Mančić	Radnički Niš	9
7	(Serbia) Vladimir Tufegdžić	Novi Sad	9
11	(Serbia) Goran Antelj	Bežanija	8
11	(Serbia) Predrag Đorđević	Sinđelić Niš	8
11	(Serbia) Danilo Sekulić	Proleter Novi Sad	8
