= FK Sloga Kraljevo =

Sloga Kraljevo
- Full name: Fudbalski klub Sloga Kraljevo
- Nickname: Beli (The Whites)
- Founded: 1947; 79 years ago
- Dissolved: 2025; 1 year ago
- Ground: Kraljevo City Stadium
- Capacity: 4,000
- Chairman: Aleksandar Mijatović
- 2024–25: Serbian League West, 16th
- Website: www.fksloga.com
Home colours	Away colours

Fudbalski klub Sloga Kraljevo (Serbian Cyrillic: Фудбалски клуб Слога Краљево) was a Serbian football club based in Kraljevo.

== History ==
In 1909 former cavalry captain Mr. Delić came to Kraljevo from Šibenik and brought the first ball which he bought in Zemun. He ran away from the Austro-Hungarian army to Belgrade, and shortly afterwards he moved to Kraljevo.

=== 1919–1945 ===
The club's first games were played in Divlje Polje, the playground was across the street of an old train station. Žiča was the first football club in Kraljevo and was founded in 1919. Its first matches were played against Viktorija from Čačak and the soldier academy. In both games Žiča suffered heavy defeats. Three years later the club changed its name to Ibar and competed in the Kragujevac League. The club existed till 1941. After the war ended a group of sport enthusiasts in April 1945 founded a football club by the name of Sloboda.

The first president of the club was Mile Mitrović. The staff was composed of Mile Pribaković, Desanka Vitorović, Stanko Lekić, Milja Tanasijević, Ratko Stojić, Nikola Naumović, Mijo Kostić, Hrane Strijelić and others. The games were played in the town centre, at the place where today lies a swimming pool.

=== Sloboda ===
The first game played by Sloboda was against Streljački bataljon (Firing squad) which was based in Kraljevo. Their jerseys were red and white and they were made from parachutes. The result was a 10:1 win for Sloga. The qualifier game for the First League was against Borac in Čačak. Sloboda led 2:0 at halftime. Borac scored a goal that should have been ruled offside at the start of the second half. A few minutes later Borac scores another goal and another one 10 minutes before the final whistle. After the match a fight broke out between the players and soon the fans got involved. The club was suspended because of this incident. A few months later Lokomotiva and Sloboda merged into one club called Sloga.

=== Sloga ===
At the beginning of the 1950s Sloga competed in the Second Serbian Liga, which then consisted of forty clubs. At the end of the season in the Serbian League Sloga finished first and was promoted to the First Serbian League. After a letter from CK KPJ (the Communist Party of Yugoslavia) all Serbian leagues are eliminated and regional leagues were formed. Sloga then competed in the Kragujevac League. In 1958 the competition changed once again: instead of four regions there were two – East and West. The biggest success in the history of Sloga was in the 1969/70 season when competing in the Second League they finished in first place in front of their eternal rival Borac Čačak. There remained only one thing in their way and that was Crvenka. To beat then they would certainly be in the First League, but Sloga did not have the luck to get past their opponents and the First League remained an unfulfilled wish. Even today people in Kraljevo talk about the events that took place on that game.

From then on the club performed less well, until they were relegated to a lower league. From then until the early 1990s Sloga never got promoted or relegated. In the 1992/93 season Sloga played in the Second League where they finished seventeenth and were relegated. The first match they played in the new league was versus their rival FK Mladost Bački Jarak, the first match was a 0:0 draw. They lost 5:2 the other game. Sloga returned to the Second League in 1998 and stayed there till 2002. After only one year in the Serbian League Sloga were relegated to the Šumadija Zone. After two years they returned to the Serbian League Zapad (West).

In summer 2025, it was announced that Sloga Kraljevo was dissolved due to mounting debts.

== Stadium ==
The stadium of Sloga is located in the Industrijska street bb. Near the stadium are the main bus and railway station. The stadium has two stands: north and south. The capacity of the stadium is around 4.000, but the biggest attendance was close to 8000 people, at the qualifying game versus FK Crvenka for the Yugoslav First League in 1970.

== Supporters ==
The supporters main organised group is called Kasapi (Butchers).

== Notable players ==
The following players represented their country during their time at the club.

- Dušan Anđelković
- Boban Dmitrović
- Vladislav Đukić
- Slobodan Janković
- Nenad Kovačević
- Aleksandar Luković
- Dragan Mladenović
- Dejan Rađenović
- Milan Rajlić
- Aco Trifunović

For the list of current and former players with Wikipedia article, please see: Category:FK Sloga Kraljevo players.
