= List of Serbian football transfers summer 2014 =

This is a list of transfers in Serbian football for the 2014 summer transfer window. Only moves featuring a Serbian SuperLiga side are listed. The order by which the clubs are listed is equal to the classification at the end of 2013–14 Serbian SuperLiga.

== Serbian SuperLiga ==
=== Red Star Belgrade ===
In: Note: Flags indicate national team as defined under FIFA eligibility rules; some limited exceptions apply. Players may hold more than one non-FIFA nationality.

No.	Pos.	Nation	Player
4	DF	SRB	Darko Lazić (loan return from Spartak Subotica)
31	GK	SRB	Marko Trkulja (loan return from Spartak Subotica)
84	FW	SRB	Đorđe Despotović (from (Belgium) Lokeren)
13	DF	SRB	Predrag Đorđević (from Javor Ivanjica)
44	FW	SRB	Nenad Gavrić (from Napredak Kruševac)
1	GK	SRB	Damir Kahriman (from (Ukraine) Tavriya Simferopol)
17	DF	SRB	Stefan Đorđević (from Voždovac)
6	DF	SRB	Bogdan Planić (from OFK Beograd)
20	MF	SRB	Miloš Bosančić (from (South Korea) Gyeongnam)
10	MF	MKD	Daniel Avramovski (from (North Macedonia) Rabotnički)
15	DF	SRB	Nikola Antić (from Rad)
27	FW	SRB	Aleksandar Katai (on loan from (Greece) Olympiacos)

Out: Note: Flags indicate national team as defined under FIFA eligibility rules; some limited exceptions apply. Players may hold more than one non-FIFA nationality.

No.	Pos.	Nation	Player
16	FW	SRB	Luka Milunović (to (Greece) Platanias)
6	DF	SRB	Jovan Krneta (to Radnički 1923)
22	GK	SRB	Miloš Vesić (to Radnički 1923)
44	DF	SLO	Dejan Kelhar (to (England) Sheffield Wednesday)
84	FW	SRB	Dragan Mrđa (to (Japan) Omiya Ardija)
1	GK	MNE	Boban Bajković (to (Belgium) Lierse)
33	MF	SRB	Miloš Ninković (to (France) Evian)
—	FW	SRB	Stefan Mihajlović (released, was on loan at Sloboda Užice)
3	DF	SRB	Ljubo Nenadić (to Mladost Lučani)
36	DF	SRB	Saša Cilinšek (released)
17	FW	MNE	Filip Kasalica (to (South Korea) Ulsan Hyundai)
9	FW	NGR	Abiola Dauda (to (Netherlands) Vitesse Arnhem)
99	FW	NGR	Ifeanyi Onyilo (on loan to (Cyprus) Ermis Aradippou)
—	MF	SRB	Nemanja Ahčin (on loan to Mladost Lučani, was on loan at (Montenegro) Grbalj)
—	DF	SRB	Marko Marinković (on loan to Sinđelić Beograd, was on loan at Smederevo)
22	GK	SRB	Filip Manojlović (on loan to Sopot)
10	MF	SRB	Nenad Milijaš (to (Turkey) Manisaspor)
—	DF	SEN	Mamadou Mbodj (on loan to Napredak Kruševac, previously brought from (Senegal) Dakar Sacré-Cœur)
20	DF	PER	Miguel Araujo (to (Peru) Alianza Lima)
—	MF	SRB	Stefan Čikić (to Sinđelić Beograd, was on loan at BSK Borča)
19	MF	SRB	Nikola Karaklajić (on loan to Sinđelić Beograd, was loan at Voždovac)
35	MF	SRB	Marko Grujić (on loan to Kolubara)
45	MF	SRB	Milan Jokić (on loan to Kolubara, was on loan at BSK Borča)
—	FW	SRB	Nikola Đorđević (on loan to BASK, was on loan at Sloga PM)
—	MF	SRB	Nikola Stojković (loan extension to BSK Borča)
—	GK	SRB	Uroš Grčić (on loan to Turbina Vreoci)
—	FW	SRB	Lazar Mitrović (on loan to Sopot)
—	DF	SRB	Zlatko Iličić (on loan to Sopot)
—	DF	SRB	Miloš Brajović (on loan to Dinamo Pančevo)
—	DF	SRB	Nemanja Jakšić (to (Montenegro) Zeta, was on loat at Železnik)
—	MF	SRB	Nenad Cvetković (on loan to IM Rakovica)
—	FW	SRB	Željko Žerađanin (on loan to IM Rakovica)
—	FW	MNE	Miloš Vukić (on loan to Dinamo Pančevo, was on loan at Hajduk Lion)
—	DF	SRB	Miroslav Simić (to Vršac)
—	FW	SRB	Milan Milovanović (to Rudar Kostolac)

=== Partizan ===
In: Note: Flags indicate national team as defined under FIFA eligibility rules; some limited exceptions apply. Players may hold more than one non-FIFA nationality.

No.	Pos.	Nation	Player
12	GK	SRB	Filip Kljajić (loan return from Teleoptik)
30	DF	SLO	Branko Ilić (from (Israel) Hapoel Tel Aviv)
28	MF	SRB	Ivan Petrović (from Radnički 1923)
29	FW	SRB	Nenad Marinković (from (Israel) Hapoel Acre)
13	DF	SRB	Lazar Ćirković (from Rad)

Out: Note: Flags indicate national team as defined under FIFA eligibility rules; some limited exceptions apply. Players may hold more than one non-FIFA nationality.

No.	Pos.	Nation	Player
—	FW	SRB	Predrag Radić (to (Germany) TSG Hoffenheim)
26	DF	SRB	Milan Obradović (to OFK Beograd)
30	GK	SRB	Nikola Petrović (released)
29	MF	SRB	Filip Malbašić (loan return to (Germany) TSG Hoffenheim)
13	DF	SRB	Nikola Aksentijević (loan return to (Netherlands) Vitesse Arnhem)
—	DF	SRB	Stefan Savić (on loan to Novi Pazar, was on loan at BSK Borča)
—	MF	SRB	Matija Ljujić (on loan to Mladost Lučani, was on loan at Teleoptik)
—	MF	SRB	Filip Knežević (to (Portugal) Vitória de Guimarães, was on loan at Radnički 1923)
—	MF	SRB	Dejan Babić (to Borac Čačak, was on loan at Rad)
—	DF	MKD	Stefan Aškovski (on loan to (Norway) Strømsgodset, was on loan at Napredak Kruševac)
—	MF	BRA	Eliomar (on loan to (Greece) Pierikos, was on loan at (Hungary) Kecskeméti TE)
—	DF	MNE	Igor Zonjić (was on loan, now signed with Mladost Lučani)
—	DF	SRB	Saša Ivković (on loan to Bačka BP, was on loan at Teleoptik)
36	MF	SRB	Nikola Gulan (to (Spain) Mallorca)
19	DF	SRB	Branko Pauljević (loan extension to Radnički Niš)
—	GK	SRB	Stefan Vasić (on loan to Mačva Šabac)
—	DF	SRB	Nemanja Mladenović (on loan to Sloga PM)
—	DF	MKD	Aleksa Amanović (to Teleoptik)
—	MF	MNE	Jovan Čađenović (to Teleoptik)
—	DF	SRB	Jovan Krstić (on loan to Teleoptik)
—	MF	SRB	Nemanja Glavčić (on loan to Teleoptik)
—	FW	SRB	Dušan Vukčević (on loan to Teleoptik)
—	FW	SRB	Svetlan Kosić (to IMT)
—	MF	SRB	Aleksa Vukomanović (to BSK Borča)
15	DF	SRB	Branislav Trajković (released)
—	FW	MNE	Balša Peličić (to Donji Srem)
35	DF	SRB	Miladin Stevanović (loan extension to Teleoptik)
23	DF	SRB	Miroslav Bogosavac (loan extension to Teleoptik)
20	MF	SRB	Saša Lukić (loan extension to Teleoptik)
—	MF	SRB	Nikola Leković (to Sloga Požega)
—	MF	SRB	Aleksa Denković (to OFK Beograd)
—	MF	SRB	Nemanja Belaković (to OFK Beograd)

=== Jagodina ===
In: Note: Flags indicate national team as defined under FIFA eligibility rules; some limited exceptions apply. Players may hold more than one non-FIFA nationality.

No.	Pos.	Nation	Player
5	DF	SRB	Danijel Gašić (free, last with Sloga Kraljevo)
91	FW	BIH	Vladimir Jovančić (free, last with (China) Tianjin Teda)
11	FW	USA	Freddy Adu (free, last with (Brazil) Bahia)
21	MF	SRB	Mile Savković (from BSK Borča)
6	DF	SRB	Aleksandar Cvetković (from BSK Borča)
—	DF	CRO	Ivan Aleksić (from (Croatia) NK Osijek)
99	MF	SRB	Nemanja Arsenijević (from Novi Pazar)
38	FW	BIH	Mićo Kuzmanović (from (Bosnia and Herzegovina) Zvijezda Gradačac)
—	DF	LBA	Mohamed El Monir (from (Libya) Al-Ittihad)
14	FW	SRB	Ognjen Ožegović (from Rad)

Out: Note: Flags indicate national team as defined under FIFA eligibility rules; some limited exceptions apply. Players may hold more than one non-FIFA nationality.

No.	Pos.	Nation	Player
45	FW	SRB	Aleksandar Pešić (to (France) Toulouse)
17	FW	SRB	Nikola Mojsilović (to Vojvodina)
13	MF	BIH	Dario Damjanović (to (Hong Kong) Sun Pegasus)
18	FW	SRB	Marko Mrkić (to Radnički Niš)
35	DF	SRB	Marko Bulat (to Bačka BP)
95	FW	SRB	Dean Tišma (to (Italy) Bari primavera)
—	DF	SRB	Nemanja Zdravković (to Inđija, was on loan at Tabane Trgovački)
—	DF	MNE	Luka Petričević (loan extension to (Montenegro) Mogren Budva)
—	FW	SRB	Nikola Mandić (to PIK Prigrevica, after loan return from Bačka 1901)
—	DF	SRB	Stefan Aleksić (to Car Konstantin, after loan return from Tabane Trgovački)
—	FW	SRB	Nemanja Stanojević (on loan to Car Konstantin, after loan return from Tabane Trgovački)
—	DF	SRB	Bojan Ciger (to Đerdap Kladovo, after loan return from Tabane Trgovački)
—	GK	SRB	Stefan Zdravković (to Sloga Despotovac)
—	DF	SRB	Marko Perović (was on loan, now sold to Sloga Despotovac)
—	MF	SRB	Igor Dimitrijević (to Sloga Despotovac, after loan return from Tabane Trgovački)
—	FW	SRB	Danilo Đurić (to Sloga Despotovac)
—	FW	SRB	Miloš Mišković (on loan to Sloga Despotovac)
22	GK	SRB	Petar Jokić (on loan to Tabane Trgovački)
—	DF	SRB	Boban Vasov (on loan to Tabane Trgovački, previously brought from (Slovenia) Celje)
—	DF	SRB	Aleksandar Varjačić (on loan to Tabane Trgovački, previously brought from Pobeda Beloševac)
—	DF	SRB	Lazar Stojković (loan extension to Tabane Trgovački)
3	DF	SRB	Ivan Miladinović (on loan to Tabane Trgovački)
—	DF	SRB	Siniša Urošević (loan extension to Tabane Trgovački)
—	DF	SRB	Aleksa Petrović (on loan to Tabane Trgovački, was on loan at Sloga Despotovac)
—	MF	SRB	Lazar Knežević (loan extension to Tabane Trgovački)
38	MF	SRB	Nikola Marinković (loan extension to Tabane Trgovački)
—	MF	SRB	Lazar Cvetković (loan extension to Tabane Trgovački)
35	FW	SRB	Mladen Stoicev (loan extension to Tabane Trgovački)
20	DF	SRB	Slađan Mijatović (on loan to Tabane Trgovački)
—	MF	SRB	Miloš Mitrović (to GFK Jasenica 1911)
12	GK	SRB	Ilija Pujkić (to Jedinstvo Paraćin)
—	GK	SRB	Marko Milenković (to Kolare)

=== Vojvodina ===
In: Note: Flags indicate national team as defined under FIFA eligibility rules; some limited exceptions apply. Players may hold more than one non-FIFA nationality.

No.	Pos.	Nation	Player
32	MF	MNE	Janko Tumbasević (loan return from Spartak Subotica)
16	MF	SRB	Milan Makarić (loan return from Proleter Novi Sad)
30	GK	SRB	Vanja Milinković-Savić (on loan from, previously sold to (England) Manchester United)
27	FW	SRB	Nikola Mojsilović (from Jagodina)
35	MF	SRB	Slobodan Novaković (from Spartak Subotica)
24	MF	SRB	Danilo Sekulić (from Voždovac)
—	MF	SRB	Almedin Zilkić (from Novi Pazar, to youth team)
—	MF	MNE	Luka Klikovac (from (Montenegro) Zeta)
—	DF	SRB	Dominik Dinga (from Hajduk Kula, to youth team)

Out: Note: Flags indicate national team as defined under FIFA eligibility rules; some limited exceptions apply. Players may hold more than one non-FIFA nationality.

No.	Pos.	Nation	Player
—	GK	SRB	Đorđe Lazović (to Spartak Subotica, was on loan at Javor)
21	MF	SRB	Sergej Milinković-Savić (to (Belgium) Genk)
14	FW	SRB	Uroš Nenadović (to Rad)
—	DF	SRB	Aleksandar Ivanović (on loan to Sloga Temerin)
27	GK	SRB	Emil Rockov (on loan to Sloga Temerin)
16	MF	SRB	Milan Spremo (on loan to Proleter Novi Sad)
2	MF	SRB	Nemanja Radoja (to (Spain) Celta Vigo)
3	DF	SRB	Nenad Kočović (on loan to ČSK Čelarevo)
—	MF	SRB	Nemanja Stanković (to Donji Srem, from youth)
20	MF	SRB	Elmir Asani (on loan to Sloga Temerin)
28	FW	SRB	Luka Grgić (on loan to ČSK Čelarevo)
—	DF	MNE	Stefan Zogović (on loan to Bačka BP, previously brought from Donji Srem)
—	FW	SRB	Georgije Ilić (on loan to Cement Beočin, after short loan to Radnički 1923)
—	MF	SRB	Aleksandar Stanić (to Radnički Šid)
—	FW	SRB	Zoran Karać (to Cement Beočin)

=== Čukarički ===
In: Note: Flags indicate national team as defined under FIFA eligibility rules; some limited exceptions apply. Players may hold more than one non-FIFA nationality.

No.	Pos.	Nation	Player
20	MF	GHA	Obeng Regan (from Napredak Kruševac)
5	DF	NGR	Ugo Ukah (from (Poland) Jagiellonia Białystok)
—	DF	SRB	Nemanja Cvetković (from Sloboda Užice)
—	MF	SRB	Nenad Cvetković (on loan from Sloboda Užice)

Out: Note: Flags indicate national team as defined under FIFA eligibility rules; some limited exceptions apply. Players may hold more than one non-FIFA nationality.

No.	Pos.	Nation	Player
5	DF	SRB	Slobodan Lalić (to (Armenia) Ulisses)
7	FW	SRB	Radislav Sekulić (released)
—	DF	SRB	Srđan Grujičić (to Donji Srem, was on loan at Kolubara)
—	DF	BIH	Milenko Malović (to Sinđelić Beograd, was on loan at BASK)
—	MF	SRB	Đorđe Isaković (to Sinđelić Beograd, was on loan at BASK)
18	FW	MNE	Nikola Zvrko (on loan to Sinđelić Beograd)
44	MF	SRB	Nikola Šakić (on loan to Sinđelić Beograd)
—	FW	SRB	Miodrag Gemović (on loan to Sinđelić Beograd, previously brought from Mačva Šabac)
—	FW	SRB	Branko Mihajlović (to (Israel) Hapoel Kfar Saba, was on loan at Sinđelić Beograd)
—	FW	SRB	Andreja Lazović (to Mačva Šabac, was on loan at Sinđelić Beograd)
—	FW	BIH	Marko Marković (to Srem Jakovo, was on loan at Vranić)
32	MF	SRB	Mihailo Miljković (on loan to IM Rakovica)
—	MF	SRB	Uroš Milošević (to IM Rakovica)
—	MF	SRB	Nenad Jevtić (to Sopot)
—	MF	SRB	Marko Simić (to Železnik)
—	MF	SRB	Uroš Galijaš (to Žarkovo)
—	DF	SRB	Miloš Pitulić (released, was on loan at Sinđelić Beograd)
—	FW	SRB	Aleksandar Stojiljković (released, was on loan at Sinđelić Beograd)
—	FW	CHI	Sebastian Guerrero (released, was on loan at Sinđelić Beograd)
—	DF	SRB	Aleksa Obradović (on loan to Sinđelić Beograd)

=== Radnički Niš ===
In: Note: Flags indicate national team as defined under FIFA eligibility rules; some limited exceptions apply. Players may hold more than one non-FIFA nationality.

No.	Pos.	Nation	Player
6	DF	SRB	Marko Tomić (from Sinđelić Niš)
30	FW	SRB	Bratislav Punoševac (from (Japan) Avispa Fukuoka)
28	DF	SRB	Vladimir Đorđević (from (Hungary) Győri ETO)
15	DF	SRB	Zoran Ljubinković (from (Romania) Universitatea Craiova)
4	DF	MKD	Vlade Lazarevski (from (Bosnia and Herzegovina) Zvijezda Gradačac)
88	FW	ECU	Augusto Batioja (from (Hungary) Diósgyőr)
20	MF	SWE	Petar Petrović (on loan from (Sweden) Malmö FF)
89	DF	MNE	Darko Bulatović (from (Montenegro) Čelik Nikšić)
18	MF	SRB	Nikola Mladenović (from Sinđelić Niš)
44	MF	KAZ	Baurzhan Turysbek (from (Kazakhstan) Spartak Semey)
19	FW	SRB	Marko Mrkić (from Jagodina)
91	FW	SRB	Vladimir Đilas (from Metalac GM)
49	DF	SRB	Branko Pauljević (loan extension from Partizan)
55	DF	SRB	Aleksandar Trninić (from (North Macedonia) Vardar)
5	MF	SRB	Pavle Popara (from (Poland) Pogoń Szczecin)
25	GK	SRB	Nikola Vasiljević (from Sloboda Užice)

Out: Note: Flags indicate national team as defined under FIFA eligibility rules; some limited exceptions apply. Players may hold more than one non-FIFA nationality.

No.	Pos.	Nation	Player
29	DF	SEN	Ibrahima Gueye (released)
7	MF	SRB	Saša Stojanović (to (Romania) Universitatea Cluj)
77	DF	BIH	Petar Jovanović (to (Romania) Universitatea Cluj)
12	FW	SRB	Sead Hadžibulić (to Novi Pazar)
27	MF	SRB	Miloš Krstić (loan return to (Switzerland) FC Thun)
4	DF	SRB	Radoš Bulatović (to (Moldova) Dacia)
17	MF	SRB	Bratislav Pejčić (to Radnik Surdulica)
22	DF	BIH	Aleksandar Kosorić (to (Bosnia and Herzegovina) Željezničar Sarajevo)
25	FW	SLO	Dragan Jelić (to (Slovenia) Rudar Velenje)
99	FW	BRA	Caio Sanchez (released)
21	MF	SRB	Strahinja Petrović (to Napredak Kruševac)
20	MF	SRB	Aleksandar Trišović (released)
50	GK	SRB	Miloš Perić (on loan to Radnik Surdulica)
—	DF	SRB	Stefan Marković (was on loan, now signed with Moravac Orion)
16	MF	SRB	Milan Ćulum (to Radnički 1923)
—	DF	SRB	Mladen Petrović (to Napredak Kruševac, was on loan Sinđelić Niš)
44	FW	SRB	Miodrag Todorović (loan extension to Car Konstantin)
—	MF	SRB	Stevan Stefanović (to Car Konstantin)
—	MF	SRB	Stefan Zdravković (loan extension to Car Konstantin)
—	MF	SRB	Milan Petrović (on loan to Radan Lebane)
—	DF	SRB	Blagoje Toković (to Sinđelić Niš)
—	DF	SRB	Dušan Stojanović (to Sinđelić Niš)
—	DF	SRB	Mladen Mitrović (on loan to Sinđelić Niš)
—	DF	SRB	Uroš Mitrović (on loan to Sinđelić Niš)
—	MF	SRB	Miloš Nikolić (on loan to Sinđelić Niš, was on loan at Radnički Pirot)
—	MF	SRB	Kemal Asanović (on loan to Sinđelić Niš)
—	MF	SRB	Filip Milivojević (to Ozren Sokobanja)
—	FW	SRB	Stefan Vukić (on loan to Sinđelić Niš)
—	FW	SRB	Aleksandar Vukadinović (to Sinđelić Niš)
—	FW	SRB	Nemanja Ranđelović (to Sinđelić Niš)
—	FW	SRB	Lazar Jeremić (to Tabane Trgovački, was on loan at Car Konstantin)
36	GK	SRB	Miodrag Filipović (released, was on loan at Radnički Pirot)

=== Voždovac ===
In: Note: Flags indicate national team as defined under FIFA eligibility rules; some limited exceptions apply. Players may hold more than one non-FIFA nationality.

No.	Pos.	Nation	Player
9	FW	SRB	Ognjen Damnjanović (from Donji Srem)
55	MF	SRB	Dušan Pantelić (from Rad)
4	MF	SRB	Uroš Sinđić (from Donji Srem)
52	MF	SRB	Zoran Marušić (on loan from Sloga Kraljevo)
99	FW	SRB	Dragoljub Anđelković (on loan from Sloga Kraljevo)
1	GK	MNE	Darko Božović (from (Hong Kong) Happy Valley)
3	DF	MKD	Tome Kitanovski (from (Romania) Universitatea Craiova)
5	DF	SRB	Miodrag Stošić (from (France) Stade Lavallois)
23	DF	SRB	Miloš Obradović (from OFK Beograd)
6	MF	BIH	Todor Petrović (from (Spain) Xerez CD)
2	DF	SRB	Predrag Stanimirović (from Dinamo Pančevo)
24	FW	SRB	Marko Radivojević (from Trstenik PPT)
22	MF	SRB	Aleksandar Petrović (from (North Macedonia) Vardar)
71	MF	SRB	Marko Adamović (from Radnički 1923)
50	FW	SRB	Miloš Džugurdić (from Spartak Subotica)
11	FW	SRB	Nenad Injac (from Rad)
7	MF	SRB	Nikola Beljić (from (Greece) Platanias)
14	MF	SLO	Davor Škerjanc (from (Greece) Ethnikos Gazoros)
29	DF	SRB	Danilo Nikolić (from (Israel) Hapoel Haifa)
25	MF	SRB	Miloš Pavlović (from (Cyprus) Doxa Katokopias)
77	DF	SRB	Nemanja Zlatković (from Javor Ivanjica)
18	FW	NGR	Obiora Odita (from (Kazakhstan) Taraz)

Out: Note: Flags indicate national team as defined under FIFA eligibility rules; some limited exceptions apply. Players may hold more than one non-FIFA nationality.

No.	Pos.	Nation	Player
17	MF	SRB	Adam Marušić (to (Belgium) Kortrijk)
16	DF	BIH	Goran Dragović (released)
95	MF	SRB	Nikola Karaklajić (loan return to Red Star)
1	GK	SRB	Zoran Popović (to Napredak Kruševac)
13	DF	SRB	Vladimir Jašić (to Radnički Kragujevac)
9	FW	SRB	Marko Pavićević (to (Greece) Ermionida)
7	MF	BIH	Mario Božić (to Borac Čačak)
5	MF	SRB	Marko Nikolić (to (Bosnia and Herzegovina) Velež Mostar)
20	FW	SRB	Rade Veljović (released)
25	MF	SRB	Dejan Milovanović (released)
2	DF	SRB	Duško Dukić (to Spartak Subotica)
3	DF	SRB	Josip Projić (to (Greece) Levadiakos)
11	DF	SRB	Stefan Đorđević (to Red Star Belgrade)
6	DF	BIH	Aleksandar Vasiljević (to Napredak Kruševac)
14	FW	SRB	Nemanja Obradović (to (Greece) Kerkyra)
—	MF	SRB	Miloš Filipović (to (Bosnia and Herzegovina) Drina Zvornik, was on loan at BSK Borča)
—	FW	SRB	Miloš Smiljanić (released, was on loan at Šumadija Jagnjilo)
7	MF	SRB	Danilo Sekulić (to Vojvodina)
4	DF	SRB	Slavko Ćulibrk (to (Bosnia and Herzegovina) Drina Zvornik)
—	GK	SRB	Filip Erić (to (Bosnia and Herzegovina) Drina Zvornik, was on loan at Šumadija Jagnjilo)
—	FW	SRB	Vladimir Trifunović (loan extension to Železnik)
—	FW	SRB	Aleksa Ćurguz (to GSP Polet)
—	FW	SRB	Dušan Milanović (to IM Rakovica)
11	DF	SRB	Nikola Todorić (to Metalac GM)
—	DF	SRB	Aleksandar Miodragović (to Sinđelić Beograd)
18	MF	SRB	Saša Jovanović (released)
—	GK	SLO	Andrej Vidali (to Hajduk Lion)

=== Novi Pazar ===
In: Note: Flags indicate national team as defined under FIFA eligibility rules; some limited exceptions apply. Players may hold more than one non-FIFA nationality.

No.	Pos.	Nation	Player
11	FW	SRB	Nemanja Vidaković (from Napredak)
1	GK	SRB	Zlatko Zečević (from OFK Beograd)
10	FW	SRB	Sead Hadžibulić (from Radnički Niš)
69	DF	SRB	Stefan Savić (on loan from Partizan)
31	DF	SRB	Žarko Udovičić (from Napredak Kruševac)
5	DF	SRB	Miloš Živković (from (Romania) Botoșani)
9	MF	SRB	Miloš Mijić (from Donji Srem)
27	MF	SRB	Vladimir Radivojević (from Rad)
17	MF	BRA	Bruno Oliveira (from (Brazil) Juazeirense)
99	DF	SRB	Miloš Tintor (from Radnički 1923)
18	MF	GER	Rijad Tafilović (from (Germany) SV Uedesheim)

Out: Note: Flags indicate national team as defined under FIFA eligibility rules; some limited exceptions apply. Players may hold more than one non-FIFA nationality.

No.	Pos.	Nation	Player
9	FW	SRB	Mladen Popović (to (Bosnia and Herzegovina) Velež Mostar)
3	DF	SRB	Radoš Protić (to (Bosnia and Herzegovina) Sarajevo)
5	MF	SRB	Miljan Mutavdžić (to Borac Čačak)
44	DF	SRB	Ersin Mehmedović (to (Albania) Vllaznia)
99	MF	SRB	Nemanja Arsenijević (to Jagodina)
12	GK	CRO	Marko Šimić (released)
—	DF	SRB	Elvedin Škrijelj (to (Montenegro) Ibar Rožaje, was on loan at Jošanica)
—	MF	SRB	Sadin Smajović (to Javor Ivanjica)
13	FW	SRB	Vuk Sotirović (to Radnički 1923)
—	MF	SRB	Almedin Zilkić (to Vojvodina)
—	MF	SRB	Edin Mujković (on loan to (Albania) Vllaznia, was on loan at Jošanica)
24	MF	SRB	Mihailo Raković (on loan to Jošanica, previously brought from Lokomotiva Beograd)
25	DF	SRB	Elvir Rebronja (on loan to Jošanica, previously brought from BASK)
—	DF	SRB	Ibis Renda (loan extension to Jošanica)
—	FW	SRB	Emir Jusufović (loan extension to Jošanica)
—	FW	SRB	Jovan Šumarac (to Bane Raška)
—	GK	SRB	Rijad Kahrović (on loan to Jošanica)
—	DF	SUI	Emil Osmanović (on loan to Jošanica)
—	DF	SRB	Faris Međedović (on loan to Jošanica)
6	DF	SRB	Demir Kadrić (to Jošanica)
—	GK	SRB	Damir Beširović (released, was on loan at Sloga Sjenica)

=== Napredak ===
In: Note: Flags indicate national team as defined under FIFA eligibility rules; some limited exceptions apply. Players may hold more than one non-FIFA nationality.

No.	Pos.	Nation	Player
1	GK	SRB	Zoran Popović (from Voždovac)
77	MF	SRB	Marko Gobeljić (from Sloga Kraljevo)
11	FW	SRB	Nikola Popović (loan return from Kolubara Lazarevac)
32	GK	SRB	Slobodan Janković (from Mladost Lučani)
87	MF	BRA	Tai (from (Greece) Iraklis)
33	DF	SRB	Zoran Belošević (from (Bosnia and Herzegovina) Zrinjski Mostar)
27	DF	SRB	Slobodan Urošević (from Rad)
13	MF	SRB	Strahinja Petrović (from Radnički Niš)
5	DF	SRB	Vukašin Tomić (from (Romania) Universitatea Craiova)
20	MF	SRB	Predrag Lazić (from (Cyprus) Ethnikos Achna)
10	MF	SRB	Predrag Govedarica (on loan from (Kazakhstan) Irtysh Pavlodar)
24	FW	CMR	Michel Vaillant (from (Cameroon) AS Green City)
34	DF	SEN	Mamadou Mbodj (on loan from Red Star Belgrade)
22	MF	SRB	Srđan Mulćan (from Bežanija)
—	MF	BIH	Miloš Sekulović (from (Bosnia and Herzegovina) Sutjeska Foča, to youth squad)
69	MF	SRB	Miloš Stanojević (from Rad)

Out: Note: Flags indicate national team as defined under FIFA eligibility rules; some limited exceptions apply. Players may hold more than one non-FIFA nationality.

No.	Pos.	Nation	Player
44	DF	MKD	Stefan Aškovski (loan return to Partizan)
11	MF	SRB	Nikola Milanković (to (Germany) Borussia Fulda)
12	FW	SRB	Nenad Gavrić (to Red Star)
1	GK	SRB	Nemanja Krznarić (to Mladost Lučani)
17	FW	SRB	Nemanja Vidaković (to Novi Pazar)
31	DF	SRB	Žarko Udovičić (to Novi Pazar)
90	FW	NGR	Patrick Friday Eze (to Mladost Lučani)
—	MF	SRB	Stevan Živković (to Radnički 1923, was on loan at Bežanija)
4	DF	SRB	Ivan Milošević (to (Uzbekistan) Bunyodkor)
27	MF	SRB	Nikola Milošević (to Sloboda Užice)
20	MF	GHA	Obeng Regan (to Čukarički)
10	MF	SRB	Stefan Vukmirović (to Sloboda Užice)
—	DF	SRB	Mladen Petrović (on loan to Bežanija, previously brought from Radnički Niš)
23	GK	SRB	Dalibor Milenković (released)
3	DF	BIH	Aleksandar Vasiljević (to Sloga Kraljevo, previously brought from Voždovac)
—	DF	SRB	Nikola Radovanović (to Kopaonik Brus)
—	MF	SRB	Mirko Pendo (to Kopaonik Brus)
—	MF	SRB	Jovica Marinković (to Kopaonik Brus)
—	DF	SRB	Miloš Paris (to Ozren Sokobanja, was on loan at Kopaonik Brus)
—	DF	SRB	Dušan Mijajlović (on loan to Ozren Sokobanja)
—	MF	SRB	Mladen Marković (was on loan, now signed with Ozren Sokobanja)
—	GK	SRB	Nenad Đurić (to Trstenik PPT)
—	DF	SRB	Anđelko Adamac (was on loan, now sold to Trstenik PPT)
—	FW	SRB	Nemanja Arsić (was on loan, now sold to Trstenik PPT)

=== Spartak Subotica ===
In: Note: Flags indicate national team as defined under FIFA eligibility rules; some limited exceptions apply. Players may hold more than one non-FIFA nationality.

No.	Pos.	Nation	Player
12	GK	SRB	Nikola Mirković (from (Bosnia and Herzegovina) Zvijezda Gradačac)
10	MF	SRB	Milorad Balabanović (from Proleter Novi Sad)
2	MF	SRB	Srđan Plavšić (from ČSK Čelarevo)
5	MF	SRB	Nenad Lukić (from Donji Srem)
9	FW	SRB	Dragan Janković (loan return from Palić)
11	DF	SRB	Duško Dukić (from Voždovac)
18	MF	SRB	Novica Maksimović (from Sloboda Užice)
20	FW	SRB	Dejan Georgijević (from Teleoptik)
25	GK	SRB	Đorđe Lazović (from Vojvodina)

Out: Note: Flags indicate national team as defined under FIFA eligibility rules; some limited exceptions apply. Players may hold more than one non-FIFA nationality.

No.	Pos.	Nation	Player
4	DF	SRB	Darko Lazić (loan return to Red Star)
1	GK	SRB	Marko Trkulja (loan return to Red Star)
20	MF	MNE	Janko Tumbasević (loan return to Vojvodina)
2	DF	SRB	Stefan Petrović (to Jedinstvo Putevi)
10	MF	SRB	Veseljko Trivunović (to Bačka BP)
11	FW	SRB	Aleksandar Nosković (to (Greece) Ergotelis)
12	GK	SRB	Branimir Aleksić (to (Greece) AEL Kalloni)
13	MF	SRB	Slobodan Novaković (to Vojvodina)
9	FW	SRB	Miloš Džugurdić (to Voždovac)
7	MF	SRB	Dino Šarac (to Donji Srem)
5	DF	MNE	Stefan Cicmil (to Mladost Lučani)
23	MF	SRB	Milan Vojvodić (on loan to Bačka 1901)
—	MF	SRB	Miljan Ljubenović (on loan to Bačka 1901, after loan return from Palić)
—	MF	SRB	Aleksa Matić (on loan to Bačka 1901, after loan return from Palić)
—	FW	SRB	Marko Matijašević (on loan to Bačka 1901, after loan return from Palić)
—	FW	SRB	Milutin Kalinić (on loan to Bačka 1901)
—	GK	MNE	Nemanja Tripković (to Bačka 1901)
—	DF	SRB	Dušan Štrbac (on loan to Senta, was on loan at Palić)
—	FW	SRB	Đorđe Ivanović (on loan to Senta, was on loan at Palić)
4	DF	SRB	Branimir Jočić (on loan to Senta, was on loan at Palić)
—	MF	SRB	Nikola Maksimović (to Bačka 1901, was on loan at Palić)
—	MF	SRB	Nikola Radonjić (to Bačka 1901)
—	DF	SRB	Nemanja Ćalasan (to Bačka 1901)
—	GK	SRB	Nikola Ićitović (to Mladost Apatin, was on loan at Palić)

=== OFK Beograd ===
In: Note: Flags indicate national team as defined under FIFA eligibility rules; some limited exceptions apply. Players may hold more than one non-FIFA nationality.

No.	Pos.	Nation	Player
18	FW	SRB	Mladen Sarajlin (from Teleoptik)
12	GK	MNE	Miloš Dragojević (from (Montenegro) Mladost Podgorica)
27	MF	SRB	Aleksandar Alempijević (from (Uzbekistan) Olmaliq)
32	MF	SRB	Mihajlo Cakić (from (Ukraine) Zorya Luhansk)
26	DF	SRB	Milan Obradović (from Partizan)
13	DF	SUI	Stefan Čolović (free)
4	MF	SRB	Saša Zdjelar (loan extension from (Greece) Olympiacos)
11	FW	MNE	Ivan Vuković (from (South Korea) Seongnam)
9	MF	MNE	Marko Janković (on loan from (Greece) Olympiacos)
36	FW	SRB	Komnen Andrić (from Radnički 1923)
15	DF	SLO	Emir Dautović (from (Slovenia) Maribor)
16	DF	SRB	Nikola Aksentijević (from (Netherlands) Vitesse Arnhem)
—	MF	SRB	Aleksa Denković (from Partizan)
33	MF	SRB	Nemanja Belaković (from Partizan)

Out: Note: Flags indicate national team as defined under FIFA eligibility rules; some limited exceptions apply. Players may hold more than one non-FIFA nationality.

No.	Pos.	Nation	Player
10	MF	MNE	Mitar Novaković (released)
29	MF	SRB	Aleksandar Stanisavljević (to Donji Srem)
—	MF	SRB	Marko Pavlovski (was on loan, now signed with (Portugal) Porto)
18	MF	SRB	Stojan Pilipović (to (Hungary) Kecskeméti TE)
1	GK	SRB	Zlatko Zečević (to Novi Pazar)
15	DF	SRB	Marko Gajić (to Javor Ivanjica)
4	DF	SRB	Bogdan Planić (to Red Star Belgrade)
5	DF	MNE	Vladan Adžić (to (South Korea) Suwon City)
28	MF	MNE	Igor Ivanović (to (Montenegro) Rudar Pljevlja)
35	DF	SRB	Miloš Obradović (to Voždovac)
—	MF	SRB	Edin Rustemović (to (Bosnia and Herzegovina) Drina Zvornik, was on loan at Sinđelić Beograd)
13	FW	MNE	Dragan Bogavac (released)
11	MF	SRB	Aleksandar Čavrić (to (Belgium) Genk)
—	DF	SRB	Branko Jovanović (to (Montenegro) Zeta)
—	DF	SRB	Luka Čermelj (to Sinđelić Beograd)
—	DF	SRB	Filip Matović (loan extension to Dinamo Pančevo)
—	MF	SRB	Luka Pojužina (to Dorćol)
—	DF	SRB	Ognjen Vukomanović (on loan to Hajduk Lion)
—	DF	SRB	Miloš Gajović (on loan to Hajduk Lion)
—	DF	SRB	Ivan Karanfilovski (to Dinamo Pančevo, was on loan at Sloga (PM))
32	MF	SRB	Milan Sekulić (on loan to Dinamo Pančevo, was on loan at Mladenovac)
—	MF	SRB	Alen Halilović (on loan to Vršac, was on loan at (Montenegro) Lovćen)
—	FW	SRB	Bogdan Tepić (loan extension to ČSK Čelarevo)
—	DF	SRB	Nikola Grković (to Metalac GM)
—	MF	MDA	Vitalie Bulat (released, was on loan at (Kazakhstan) Sunkar)
—	DF	SRB	Nikola Šipčić (to Rad)

=== Donji Srem ===
In: Note: Flags indicate national team as defined under FIFA eligibility rules; some limited exceptions apply. Players may hold more than one non-FIFA nationality.

No.	Pos.	Nation	Player
18	FW	SRB	Darko Spalević (from Radnički 1923)
7	MF	GHA	Abdul Rashid Obuobi (from Sloga Kraljevo)
11	MF	SRB	Aleksandar Stanisavljević (from OFK Beograd)
44	MF	SRB	Srđan Grujičić (from Čukarički)
21	MF	SRB	Bojan Beljić (from Radnički 1923)
15	DF	SRB	Dušan Ivanov (from Sinđelić Beograd)
1	GK	SRB	Miloš Milinović (from Sloga PM)
3	DF	SRB	Dušan Punoševac (from Sloga PM)
33	MF	SRB	Dino Šarac (from Spartak Subotica)
5	MF	GHA	Abubakar Moro (from (Ghana) Hearts of Oak)
99	FW	SRB	Vladimir Tufegdžić (from (North Macedonia) Gorno Lisiče)
55	MF	SRB	Nemanja Stanković (from Vojvodina youth)
10	MF	BIH	Rade Krunić (on loan from, previously sold to (Italy) Hellas Verona)
23	FW	BIH	Marko Mazalica (from (Bosnia and Herzegovina) Sloboda Novi Grad)
30	FW	MNE	Balša Peličić (from Partizan youth team)

Out: Note: Flags indicate national team as defined under FIFA eligibility rules; some limited exceptions apply. Players may hold more than one non-FIFA nationality.

No.	Pos.	Nation	Player
21	FW	SRB	Ognjen Damnjanović (to Voždovac)
7	DF	SRB	Ivan Božović (to Jedinstvo Užice)
3	DF	SRB	Danilo Kuzmanović (to Zemun)
18	DF	SRB	Mladen Veselinović (to Sloga PM)
20	MF	SRB	Lazar Čordašić (to Inđija)
16	DF	MNE	Stefan Zogović (to Vojvodina)
5	DF	SRB	Vladimir Nikitović (released)
13	FW	BIH	Neđo Šuka (to (Bosnia and Herzegovina) Kozara Gradiška)
25	FW	MNE	Nemanja Ćosović (released)
15	MF	SRB	Uroš Sinđić (to Voždovac)
44	MF	SRB	Miloš Mijić (to Novi Pazar)
17	MF	BIH	Miljan Govedarica (to (Bosnia and Herzegovina) Slavija Sarajevo)
11	MF	SRB	Nenad Lukić (to Spartak Subotica)
5	MF	SRB	Miloš Ožegović (on loan to Mačva Šabac, previously brought from Radnik Surdulica)
25	FW	SRB	Slađan Nikodijević (to Metalac GM)
—	MF	SRB	Ivan Gmizić (was on loan, now signed with Srem Jakovo)
12	GK	SRB	Matija Šegavac (on loan to Dunav Stari Banovci, was on loan at Cement Beočin)
20	MF	SRB	Dario Božičić (released, previously brought from Bežanija)

=== Radnički 1923 ===
In: Note: Flags indicate national team as defined under FIFA eligibility rules; some limited exceptions apply. Players may hold more than one non-FIFA nationality.

No.	Pos.	Nation	Player
1	GK	SRB	Miloš Vesić (from Red Star Belgrade)
13	DF	SRB	Vladimir Jašić (from Voždovac)
32	FW	SRB	Savo Kovačević (from (Kazakhstan) Spartak Semey)
11	MF	SRB	Stevan Živković (from Napredak Kruševac)
9	MF	SRB	Branislav Čonka (from Inđija)
44	DF	BIH	Borislav Terzić (from Sloboda Užice)
7	FW	SRB	Dragan Milovanović (from (Kyrgyzstan) Dordoi Bishkek)
—	DF	SRB	Marko Đorđević (from (Vanuatu) Amicale)
26	MF	SRB	Nemanja Vidić (from Javor Ivanjica)
28	MF	GHA	Joseph Cudjoe (on loan from Radnik Surdulica)
4	MF	MNE	Luka Tiodorović (from (Albania) Lushnja)
77	MF	SRB	Irfan Vusljanin (from (Bosnia and Herzegovina) Sarajevo)
23	DF	GHA	Godwin Osei Bonsu (from Radnik Surdulica)
30	DF	SRB	Miloš Rnić (from (Belarus) Minsk)
2	DF	SRB	Jovan Krneta (from Red Star Belgrade)
29	MF	SRB	Marko Perović (from (Thailand) Chainat Hornbill)
55	DF	SRB	Predrag Jović (from Inđija)
6	MF	SRB	Aleksandar Janković (from (Netherlands) Den Haag youth)
10	MF	SRB	Lazar Arsić (from (Hungary) Lombard-Pápa)
61	MF	SRB	Milan Ćulum (from Radnički Niš)
99	FW	SLO	David Poljanec (from (Israel) Maccabi Ahi Nazareth)
46	FW	SRB	Vuk Sotirović (from Novi Pazar)

Out: Note: Flags indicate national team as defined under FIFA eligibility rules; some limited exceptions apply. Players may hold more than one non-FIFA nationality.

No.	Pos.	Nation	Player
18	FW	SRB	Darko Spalević (to Donji Srem)
77	MF	SRB	Filip Knežević (loan return to Partizan)
8	MF	SRB	Bojan Beljić (to Donji Srem)
4	DF	SRB	Miloš Tintor (to Novi Pazar)
7	DF	SRB	Slavko Marić (to (Greece) Lamia)
22	GK	SRB	Ognjen Čančarević (to Sloboda Užice)
10	MF	SRB	Dušan Petronijević (released)
32	MF	SRB	Ivan Petrović (to Partizan)
11	MF	SRB	Aleksandar Stoimirović (to (Greece) Ermionida)
6	MF	SRB	Stefan Nedović (released)
9	FW	SRB	Komnen Andrić (to OFK Beograd)
17	MF	SRB	Marko Adamović (to Voždovac)
14	FW	MKD	Dragan Čadikovski (to Kolubara)
99	FW	SRB	Bojan Malinić (to Sinđelić Beograd)
2	DF	SRB	Darko Bjelanović (to Pobeda Beloševac)
24	DF	SRB	Petar Pavlović (released)
23	FW	SRB	Lazar Popović (on loan to Pobeda Beloševac)
14	FW	SRB	Georgije Ilić (loan return to Vojvodina)
18	FW	SRB	Stefan Stojanović (on loan to Radnički Svilajnac, previously brought from same club)
21	MF	SRB	Aleksandar Keljević (on loan to Pobeda Beloševac, previously brought from Javor Ivanjica)
16	MF	SRB	Uroš Vidović (on loan to Pobeda Beloševac)
25	MF	SRB	Dušan Stević (on loan to Šumadija 1903)
95	GK	SRB	Marko Kostić (on loan to Pobeda Beloševac)
—	DF	SRB	Bojan Miljuš (loan extension to Pobeda Beloševac)
—	DF	SRB	Lazar Petrović (loan extension to Pobeda Beloševac)
—	MF	SRB	Andrija Ratković (to Javor Ivanjica)
—	DF	SRB	Ivan Živanović (on loan to Pobeda Beloševac)
—	MF	SRB	Filip Aleksić (on loan to Šumadija 1903)
—	DF	SRB	Đorđe Milivojević (to Karađorđe Topola)
88	MF	SRB	Radovan Krivokapić (released)
—	FW	SRB	Kosta Pantelić (to Bežanija)

=== Rad ===
In: Note: Flags indicate national team as defined under FIFA eligibility rules; some limited exceptions apply. Players may hold more than one non-FIFA nationality.

No.	Pos.	Nation	Player
51	FW	SRB	Slavko Perović (loan return from (Turkey) Manisaspor)
70	FW	SRB	Uroš Nenadović (from Vojvodina)
4	DF	SRB	Nikola Đurić (from (Greece) Ethnikos Gazoros)
86	DF	SRB	Miloš Marković (from (Bosnia and Herzegovina) Borac Banja Luka)
11	FW	BIH	Petar Jelić (from (China) Guangdong Sunray Cave)
77	FW	SRB	Borko Veselinović (from Javor Ivanjica)
55	DF	BIH	Delimir Bajić (from (Bosnia and Herzegovina) Mladost V. O.)
8	MF	SRB	Miloš Milisavljević (from Kolubara)
18	FW	MNE	Nikola Vujnović (on loan from Radnički Obrenovac)

Out: Note: Flags indicate national team as defined under FIFA eligibility rules; some limited exceptions apply. Players may hold more than one non-FIFA nationality.

No.	Pos.	Nation	Player
11	MF	SRB	Dejan Babić (loan return to Partizan)
—	MF	SRB	Dušan Pantelić (to Voždovac, was on loan at Teleoptik)
33	DF	SRB	Srđa Knežević (to (Japan) V-Varen Nagasaki)
17	DF	MKD	Aleksandar Lazevski (loan return to (Ukraine) Hoverla)
88	GK	SRB	Branislav Danilović (to (Hungary) Puskás Akadémia)
28	DF	SRB	Slobodan Urošević (to Napredak Kruševac)
10	MF	SRB	Andrija Luković (to (Netherlands) PSV)
3	DF	SRB	Nikola Antić (to Red Star Belgrade)
12	MF	SRB	Stefan Čolović (to (Bosnia and Herzegovina) Drina Zvornik)
6	DF	BIH	Saša Kolunija (to Bežanija)
27	MF	SRB	Vladimir Radivojević (to Novi Pazar)
15	FW	SRB	Stefan Tripković (to Sloga PM)
4	DF	SRB	Lazar Ćirković (to Partizan)
—	DF	SRB	Miroljub Pešić (on loan to Sinđelić Beograd, was on loan at Železnik)
8	FW	SRB	Nenad Injac (to Voždovac)
14	FW	SRB	Ognjen Ožegović (to Jagodina)
9	MF	SRB	Nenad Srećković (to (Slovenia) Koper)
31	FW	SRB	Anto Vasović (to Brodarac)
34	MF	SRB	Vuk Ranđić (to Žarkovo)
—	DF	BIH	Stefan Vukadin (to IM Rakovica, was on loan at Žarkovo)
—	DF	SRB	Uroš Stojanović (to BASK)
—	FW	SRB	Branislav Grubor (to BASK)
—	DF	SRB	Predrag Radojević (to Javor Ivanjica)
—	MF	SRB	Igor Radić (to Dunav Stari Banovci)
—	FW	SRB	Nikola Ivković (to Zemun, was on loan at Žarkovo)
12	GK	BIH	Darko Dejanović (loan extension to Žarkovo)
24	DF	SRB	Stefan Vico (on loan to Žarkovo)
18	MF	SRB	Uroš Damnjanović (to Teleoptik)
5	MF	SRB	Miloš Stanojević (to Napredak Kruševac)
—	DF	SRB	Nikola Šipčić (on loan to Žarkovo, previously brought from OFK Beograd)

=== Mladost Lučani ===
In: Note: Flags indicate national team as defined under FIFA eligibility rules; some limited exceptions apply. Players may hold more than one non-FIFA nationality.

No.	Pos.	Nation	Player
27	MF	SRB	Matija Ljujić (on loan from Partizan)
3	DF	SRB	Rade Pejić (from Inđija)
91	GK	SRB	Bojan Tanasijević (from Železničar Lajkovac)
1	GK	SRB	Nemanja Krznarić (from Napredak Kruševac)
7	FW	SRB	Saša Jovanović (from Smederevo)
4	MF	SRB	Miloš Adamović (from (Azerbaijan) Ravan Baku)
45	FW	NGR	Patrick Friday Eze (from Napredak Kruševac)
13	DF	SRB	Luka Šarac (from Hajduk Kula)
69	DF	MNE	Igor Zonjić (was on loan, now signed from Partizan)
28	MF	SRB	Nemanja Ahčin (on loan from Red Star Belgrade)
25	DF	SRB	Ljubo Nenadić (from Red Star Belgrade)
58	DF	MNE	Stefan Cicmil (from Spartak Subotica)

Out: Note: Flags indicate national team as defined under FIFA eligibility rules; some limited exceptions apply. Players may hold more than one non-FIFA nationality.

No.	Pos.	Nation	Player
7	MF	SRB	Radojica Vasić (retired)
1	GK	SRB	Slobodan Janković (to Napredak Kruševac)
4	DF	SRB	Marko Bošković (released)
—	FW	SRB	Danilo Kovačević (to Sloga PM)
16	MF	SRB	Marko Avramović (to Sloboda Užice)
—	DF	SRB	Miljan Stojanović (on loan to Ozren Sokobanja)
—	DF	SRB	Đorđe Lazović (to Kolubara)
—	FW	SRB	Ivan Stojić (was on loan, now signed with Polet Ljubić)
—	MF	SRB	Igor Stanković (to Sloga Požega)
—	MF	SRB	Stefan Jovanović (to Sloga Požega)
—	DF	SRB	Miloš Ristić (on loan to Železničar Lajkovac)
20	MF	SRB	Matija Protić (loan extension to Polet Ljubić)

=== Borac Čačak ===
In: Note: Flags indicate national team as defined under FIFA eligibility rules; some limited exceptions apply. Players may hold more than one non-FIFA nationality.

No.	Pos.	Nation	Player
32	MF	SRB	Miljan Mutavdžić (from Novi Pazar)
8	MF	SRB	Dejan Babić (from Partizan)
15	DF	SRB	Aleksandar Gojković (from Sloboda Užice)
33	DF	SRB	Nemanja Miletić (from Sloga Kraljevo)
25	MF	BIH	Mario Božić (from Voždovac)
6	DF	PLE	Javier Cohene (from (Portugal) Vitória Setúbal)
3	DF	MNE	Risto Radunović (from (Montenegro) Budućnost Podgorica)

Out: Note: Flags indicate national team as defined under FIFA eligibility rules; some limited exceptions apply. Players may hold more than one non-FIFA nationality.

No.	Pos.	Nation	Player
22	DF	SRB	Dejan Stamenković (released)
25	DF	SRB	Ivica Milutinović (released)
6	DF	SRB	Ivan Babić (to Sloga Kraljevo)
44	DF	LBR	Omega Roberts (released, previously brought from (Montenegro) Mladost Podgorica)
3	MF	SRB	Branko Jovičić (to (Russia) Amkar Perm)
—	FW	CHA	Misdongarde Betolngar (to Sloga Kraljevo)
—	FW	SRB	Milanko Rašković (to Zemun, after loan return from (Montenegro) Čelik Nikšić)
—	DF	SRB	Zvezdan Đorđilović (loan extension to Polet Ljubić)
—	DF	SRB	Igor Dunjić (on loan to Polet Ljubić)
—	MF	SRB	Neven Radaković (on loan to Polet Ljubić, previously brought from Jedinstvo Novi Bečej)
—	MF	SRB	Lazar Kalajanović (loan extension to Polet Ljubić)
—	MF	SRB	Zoran Petrović (on loan to Polet Ljubić)
—	MF	SRB	Radojko Cerović (on loan to Polet Ljubić)
—	MF	SRB	Branislav Tomić (on loan to Polet Ljubić)
—	FW	SRB	Vukašin Drakulić (on loan to Polet Ljubić)
—	FW	SRB	Jovan Mihajlović (on loan to Polet Ljubić)
—	FW	SRB	Nenad Vasiljević (to Sloga Požega)
16	FW	SRB	Nikola Nešović (loan extension to Polet Ljubić)

== See also ==
- Serbian SuperLiga
- 2014–15 Serbian SuperLiga
