= 2017–18 FK Mladost Lučani season =

Mladost Lučani
2017–18 season
- Chairman: Vladimir Đorđević
- Manager: Nenad Milovanović
- Stadium: Mladost Stadium
- Serbian SuperLiga: -
- Serbian Cup: -
- Europa League: First qualifying round
Home colours	Away colours

The 2017–18 Mladost Lučani season is the football club's 4th straight season in Serbian SuperLiga.

== Squad ==
As of 29 September 2017

Note: Flags indicate national team as defined under FIFA eligibility rules; some limited exceptions apply. Players may hold more than one non-FIFA nationality.

No.	Pos.	Nation	Player
1	GK	SRB	Nikola Petrić
4	DF	SRB	Ivan Milošević (captain)
5	MF	CHN	Wang Lei
8	FW	SRB	Stefan Golubović
9	FW	MNE	Nikola Zvrko
10	MF	UZB	Husniddin Gafurov
11	MF	SRB	Uroš Sinđić
13	FW	GHA	Bismarck Appiah
14	FW	SRB	Miloš Trifunović
15	MF	SRB	Aleksandar Pejović
16	MF	SRB	Nikola Cuckić
17	MF	SRB	Ivan Pešić
18	FW	NGA	Obiora Odita
20	MF	SRB	Nenad Marinković
22	GK	SRB	Zlatko Zečević

No.	Pos.	Nation	Player
23	GK	SRB	Dragan Rosić
26	DF	SRB	Slavko Marić
27	MF	SRB	Vladimir Radivojević
28	DF	SRB	Nikola Andrić
31	MF	MNE	Janko Tumbasević
32	FW	SRB	Ivan Marković
44	DF	SRB	Bogdan Milošević
58	FW	CMR	Michel Vaillant
77	MF	SRB	Predrag Pavlović
88	MF	SRB	Stefan Milosavljević
93	DF	BIH	Miloš Šatara
98	MF	SRB	Zehrudin Mehmedović
99	MF	SRB	Veljko Kijevčanin
––	DF	SRB	Stefan Jovanović

== Transfers ==
=== Summer ===
In: Note: Flags indicate national team as defined under FIFA eligibility rules; some limited exceptions apply. Players may hold more than one non-FIFA nationality.

No.	Pos.	Nation	Player
10	MF	UZB	Husniddin Gafurov (from Javor Ivanjica)
—	FW	GHA	Bismarck Appiah (from Bačka BP)
13	MF	SRB	Nenad Marinković (from Voždovac)
11	MF	SRB	Uroš Sinđić (from Voždovac)
32	FW	SRB	Ivan Marković (from Novi Pazar)
14	FW	SRB	Miloš Trifunović (from Radnik Surdulica)

Out: Note: Flags indicate national team as defined under FIFA eligibility rules; some limited exceptions apply. Players may hold more than one non-FIFA nationality.

No.	Pos.	Nation	Player
10	FW	SRB	Radomir Milosavljević (to (Switzerland) Lugano)
11	MF	SRB	Nebojša Gavrić (released)
33	DF	SRB	Radoš Protić (released)
16	FW	SRB	Bojan Čečarić (released)
14	FW	SRB	Marko Simić (released)
88	FW	SRB	Milan Bojović (to (Kazakhstan) Kaisar)
