= Dejan Miljuš =

Serbian footballer (born 1994)

Personal information
- Date of birth: 24 October 1994 (age 32)
- Place of birth: Knin, Croatia
- Height: 1.79 m (5 ft 10 in)
- Position: Winger

Youth career
- 2005–2013: Radnički Kragujevac

Senior career*
Years	Team	Apps	(Gls)
2013–2018	Radnički Kragujevac	65	(9)
2013	→ Pobeda Beloševac (loan)	14	(5)
- * Club domestic league appearances and goals as of 14 June 2017

Dejan Miljuš (Serbian Cyrillic: Дејан Миљуш; born 24 October 1994) is a Serbian football forward.

== Club career ==
=== Radnički Kragujevac ===
Miljuš has started playing football in academy named "Fitness" in Kragujevac at the age of 6, along with his twin brother Dejan. After 5 years, they moved to the local Radnički. After he passed youth categories, Miljuš was loaned as a scholar to the Serbian League West side Pobeda Beloševac, where he was trained by Željko Milošević, former defender, and captain of Radnički Kragujevac. Playing with Pobeda, Miljuš collected 14 caps in the first half of the 2013–14 Serbian League West season with 5 goals. He scored 5 goals in matches against Partizan Bumbarevo Brdo, Bane, Jošanica, Seljak and Krušik.

During the winter break off-season, Miljuš scored several goals in some friendly matches with Radnički, and proved himself to be involved in the first team. He made his professional debut for Radnički Kragujevac in 16 fixture of the 2013–14 Serbian SuperLiga season, replacing Dragan Čadikovski in 88 minute of the match against Radnički Niš, played on 23 February 2014 at the Čika Dača Stadium. In his second match for the team, Miljuš scored in a spectacular away game against Napredak Kruševac.

== Career statistics ==
=== Club ===
As of 14 June 2017

Appearances and goals by club, season and competition
Club	Season	League			Cup		Continental		Other		Total	
Club	Season	Division	Apps	Goals	Apps	Goals	Apps	Goals	Apps	Goals	Apps	Goals
Pobeda Beloševac (loan)	2013–14	League West	14	5	—		—		—		14	5
Radnički Kragujevac	2013–14	SuperLiga	11	2	—		—		—		11	2
Radnički Kragujevac	2014–15	SuperLiga	17	1	0	0	—		—		17	1
Radnički Kragujevac	2015–16	First League	23	5	0	0	—		—		23	5
Radnički Kragujevac	2016–17	League West	14	1	1 (Note: Including preliminary round against Polet Ljubić)	0	—		—		15	1
Radnički Kragujevac	2017–18	First League	0	0	—		—		—		0	0
Radnički Kragujevac	Total		65	9	1	0	—		—		66	9
Career total			79	14	1	0	—		—		80	14

== Honours ==
Radnički Kragujevac

- Serbian League West: 2016–17

== Personal life ==
Around a year after he was born, the Miljuš family moved from Knin to Kragujevac, due to Operation Storm. His twin brother, Bojan, is also footballer.
