= Miloš Ožegović =

Serbian footballer

Personal information
- Date of birth: 11 May 1992 (age 34)
- Place of birth: Pančevo, FR Yugoslavia
- Height: 1.93 m (6 ft 4 in)
- Position: Defensive midfielder

Team information
- Current team: Dinamo Pančevo

Senior career*
Years	Team	Apps	(Gls)
2010–2012	Dolina Padina	33	(0)
2012–2013	Dinamo Pančevo	26	(2)
2013–2014	Radnik Surdulica	25	(1)
2014	Donji Srem	0	(0)
2014	→ Mačva Šabac (loan)	5	(0)
2015	Sinđelić Beograd	13	(0)
2015–2016	Jagodina	8	(0)
2016	Sinđelić Beograd	12	(1)
2016–2017	Radnički Pirot	13	(0)
2017–2018	Vikingur	32	(1)
2019	Dinamo Vranje	15	(0)
2019–2020	Napredak Kruševac	22	(1)
2020–2021	Radnički Pirot	8	(0)
2021	Mladost Lučani	12	(0)
2021–2022	Mladost Novi Sad	24	(1)
2022–2023	Mauerwerk	18	(0)
2023–2024	Smederevo 1924	13	(0)
2024-	Dinamo Pančevo		
- * Club domestic league appearances and goals as of 26 December 2023

Miloš Ožegović (Serbian Cyrillic: Милош Ожеговић; born 11 May 1992) is a Serbian football midfielder who plays for Dinamo Pančevo.

== Career ==
=== Dolina Padina ===
Playing for Dolina Padina, Ožegović made 33 League Vojvodina appearances for 2 seasons.

=== Dinamo Pančevo ===
After left Dolina, Ožegović moved in Dinamo Pančevo, where he scored 2 goals on 26 appearances in the League Vojvodina. After the end of season, he left the club from Pančevo.

=== Radnik Surdulica ===
For 2013–14 season, Miloš played in the Serbian First League with Radnik Surdulica. He made 25 appearances and scored 1 goal, against Mladost Lučani. He left the club after ended season.

=== Donji Srem ===
Miloš Ožegović joined Donji Srem for the 2014–15 season together with Abdul Rashid Obuobi, but he was loaned to Mačva Šabac later.

==== Loaning to Mačva Šabac ====
Ožegović made 5 appearances playing for Mačva Šabac, as a loaned player of Donji Srem.

=== Sinđelić Beograd ===
Next club in Ožegović's career was a Sinđelić Beograd. He had 13 caps until the end of 2014–15 season.

=== Jagodina ===
In the summer of 2015, Ožegović signed with Jagodina, but due to administrative problems gained the right to play in 3rd fixture of 2015–16 season, when he made his SuperLiga debut.

== Career statistics ==
As of 8 November 2015

Club performance			League		Cup		Continental		Total	
Season	Club	League	Apps	Goals	Apps	Goals	Apps	Goals	Apps	Goals
Serbia			League		Serbian Cup		Europe		Total	
2010–11	Dolina Padina	League Vojvodina	10	0	0	0	0	0	10	0
2011–12	Dolina Padina	League Vojvodina	23	0	0	0	0	0	23	0
2012–13	Dinamo Pančevo	League Vojvodina	26	2	0	0	0	0	26	2
2013–14	Radnik Surdulica	First League	25	1	0	0	0	0	25	1
2014–15	Mačva Šabac	First League	5	0	0	0	0	0	5	0
2014–15	Sinđelić Beograd	First League	13	0	0	0	0	0	13	0
2015–16	Jagodina	SuperLiga	8	0	1	0	0	0	9	0
Total	Serbia		110	3	1	0	0	0	111	3
Career total			110	3	1	0	0	0	111	3
