= Lazar Mitrović =

Lazar Mitrović may refer to:

- Lazar Mitrović (footballer, born 1993), Serbian association football player who plays for FK BSK Borča
- Lazar Mitrović (footballer, born 1998), Serbian association football player who plays for FK Radnički Niš
