= Vladimir Nikitović =

Serbian footballer

Personal information
- Full name: Vladimir Nikitović
- Date of birth: 4 December 1980 (age 45)
- Place of birth: Čačak, SFR Yugoslavia
- Height: 1.84 m (6 ft 1/2 in)
- Position: Centre-back

Senior career*
Years	Team	Apps	(Gls)
2001–2003	Remont Čačak	0	(0)
2003–2004	Takovo	24	(1)
2004–2006	Metalac Gornji Milanovac	51	(1)
2006–2008	Radnički Kragujevac	31	(2)
2007	→ Sloboda Čačak (loan)	10	(1)
2008–2009	Sarajevo	15	(0)
2009	Partizan Bumbarevo Brdo	10	(2)
2010	Kom	10	(0)
2010–2012	Shkëndija	55	(2)
2012	Metalurg Skopje	0	(0)
2013	Bregalnica Štip	11	(0)
2013	Polet Ljubić	11	(0)
2014	Donji Srem	8	(1)
2015	Oulu PS	10	(0)
- * Club domestic league appearances and goals

Vladimir Nikitović (Serbian Cyrillic: Bлaдимиp Hикитoвић; born 4 December 1980) is a Serbian retired football defender.

== Career ==
He has played for FK Drugar Donja Trepča, FK Remont Čačak (2001–2003), FK Takovo (2003–2004), FK Metalac Gornji Milanovac (2004–2006), FK Sloboda Čačak (2006), FK Radnički Kragujevac (2006–2008) and FK Sarajevo (2008–09, 15 league matches, 0 goals), FK Kom (2009–10), FK Škendija (2010–2012) and FK Metalurg Skopje (2012-) in the Macedonian First League.
