= Marko Avramović =

Marko Avramović may refer to:

- Marko Avramović (water polo) (born 1986), Serbian water polo player
- Marko Avramović (footballer) (born 1987), Serbian football midfielder
