= Bojan Miljuš =

Serbian footballer

Personal information
- Date of birth: 24 October 1994 (age 32)
- Place of birth: Knin, Croatia
- Height: 1.78 m (5 ft 10 in)
- Position: Left wing-back

Team information
- Current team: FC Tempo Frankfurt
- Number: 10

Youth career
- 2005–2013: Radnički Kragujevac

Senior career*
| Years | Team | Apps | (Gls) |
| 2013–2015 | Radnički Kragujevac | 11 | (0) |
| 2013–2014 | → Pobeda Beloševac (loan) | 25 | (0) |
| 2015–2016 | Teleoptik | 7 | (0) |
| 2016–2019 | Radnički Kragujevac | 54 | (2) |
| 2020 | SG Westend Frankfurt | 2 | (0) |
| 2021– | FC Tempo Frankfurt | 73 | (28) |
- * Club domestic league appearances and goals as of 19 May 2021

Bojan Miljuš (Serbian Cyrillic: Бојан Миљуш; born 24 October 1994) is a Serbian football defender.

== Career ==
=== Radnički Kragujevac ===
Miljuš has started playing football in academy named "Fitness" in Kragujevac at the age of 6, along with his twin brother Dejan. After 5 years, they moved to the local Radnički. After he passed youth categories, Miljuš was loaned as a scholar to the Serbian League West side Pobeda Beloševac, where he was trained by Željko Milošević, former defender, and captain of Radnički Kragujevac. Playing with Pobeda, Miljuš noted 25 league appearances between 2013 and 2015.

Miljuš made his professional debut for Radnički Kragujevac in the Serbian SuperLiga match against Napredak Kruševac at Mladost Stadium on 28 February 2015, and later collected 9 matches at total until the end of season. After 2 games in the 2015–16 Serbian First League season, he left the club, and moved to Serbian League Belgrade side Teleoptik for a short spell. Returning to Radnički, Miljuš helped the team to win the Serbian League West for the 2016–17 season.

== Personal life ==
Around a year after he was born, the Miljuš family moved from Knin to Kragujevac, due to Operation Storm. His twin brother, Dejan, is also a footballer.

== Career statistics ==
As of 31 May 2018

Appearances and goals by club, season and competition
| Club | Season | League | | | Cup | | Continental | | Other | | Total | |
| Club | Season | Division | Apps | Goals | Apps | Goals | Apps | Goals | Apps | Goals | Apps | Goals |
|---|---|---|---|---|---|---|---|---|---|---|---|---|
| Pobeda Beloševac (loan) | 2013–14 | League West | 11 | 0 | — | | — | | — | | 11 | 0 |
| Pobeda Beloševac (loan) | 2014–15 | League West | 14 | 0 | — | | — | | — | | 14 | 0 |
| Pobeda Beloševac (loan) | Total | | 25 | 0 | — | | — | | — | | 25 | 0 |
| Teleoptik | 2015–16 | League Belgrade | 7 | 0 | — | | — | | — | | 7 | 0 |
| Radnički Kragujevac | 2014–15 | SuperLiga | 9 | 0 | — | | — | | — | | 9 | 0 |
| Radnički Kragujevac | 2015–16 | First League | 2 | 0 | — | | — | | — | | 2 | 0 |
| Radnički Kragujevac | 2016–17 | League West | 24 | 2 | 0 | 0 | — | | 1 (Note: Including Kragujevac city cup match against Sloga Lužnica) | 2 | 25 | 4 |
| Radnički Kragujevac | 2017–18 | First League | 25 | 0 | — | | — | | — | | 25 | 0 |
| Radnički Kragujevac | Total | | 60 | 2 | 0 | 0 | — | | 1 | 2 | 61 | 4 |
| Career total | | | 92 | 2 | 0 | 0 | — | | 1 | 2 | 93 | 4 |

== Honours ==
Radnički Kragujevac

- Serbian League West: 2016–17
