= Slobodan Janković =

Slobodan Janković may refer to:

- Boban Janković (Slobodan Janković, 1963–2006), Yugoslavian basketball player
- Slobodan Janković (footballer, born 1946), Yugoslavian/ Serbian midfielder
- Slobodan Janković (footballer, born 1981), Serbian football goalkeeper for Mladost Lučani
