= Jašić =

Jašić is a Bosniak surname.

== People with the surname ==
- Adis Jasic (born 2003), Austrian footballer of Bosnian descent
- Vladimir Jašić (born 1984), a Serbian football player
