= Đorđe Lazović =

Đorđe Lazović may refer to:

- Đorđe Lazović (footballer, born 1990), Serbian association football defender
- Đorđe Lazović (footballer, born 1992), Serbian association football goalkeeper
