= Grujičić =

Grujičić (Serbian Cyrillic: Грујичић) is a Serbian surname. People with the name include:

- Miroslav Grujičić (born 1994), Serbian football goalkeeper
- Srđan Grujičić (born 1987), Serbian football midfielder
