= Bjelanović =

Bjelanović (Serbian Cyrillic: Бјелановић) is a Serbo-Croatian surname, a patronymic derived from Bjelan. It may refer to:

- Saša Bjelanović (born 1979), retired Croatian footballer
- Sava Bjelanović (1850–1897), Dalmatian Serb politician
- Darko Bjelanović (born 1991), Serbian footballer
