= Stefan Čolović (Swiss footballer) =

Serbian-born Swiss footballer (born 1994)

Personal information
- Full name: Stefan Čolović
- Date of birth: 2 July 1994 (age 32)
- Place of birth: Belgrade, FR Yugoslavia
- Height: 1.86 m (6 ft 1 in)
- Position: Left-back

Youth career
- 2011–2012: Basel
- 2012–2014: Tottenham Hotspur

Senior career*
Years	Team	Apps	(Gls)
2014–2015	OFK Beograd	1	(0)
2018–2019	Jedinstvo Surčin		

International career^{‡}
2009	Switzerland U16		
- * Club domestic league appearances and goals as of 19 January 2016 ‡ National team caps and goals as of 19 January 2016

Stefan Čolović (Serbian Cyrillic: Стефан Чоловић; born 2 July 1994) is a Serbian born Swiss football defender.

== Career ==
Čolović played for young categories of Basel, and later he moved in Tottenham Hotspur. In summer 2014 he signed OFK Beograd. He made his Jelen SuperLiga debut for OFK Beograd on away match against Radnički Kragujevac on 2 November 2014.

== Career statistics ==
As of 2 November 2014

Club	Season	League		Cup		Europe		Other		Total	
Club	Season	Apps	Goals	Apps	Goals	Apps	Goals	Apps	Goals	Apps	Goals
OFK Beograd
OFK Beograd	2014–15	1	0	0	0	0	0	0	0	1	0
OFK Beograd	Total	1	0	0	0	0	0	0	0	1	0
Career total		1	0	0	0	0	0	0	0	1	0
