= Miloš Marić =

Serbian footballer

Personal information
- Full name: Miloš Marić
- Date of birth: 5 March 1982 (age 44)
- Place of birth: Titovo Užice, SFR Yugoslavia
- Height: 1.76 m (5 ft 9 in)
- Position: Midfielder

Senior career*
Years	Team	Apps	(Gls)
1999–2000	Sloboda Užice	7	(0)
2000–2001	Remont Čačak	24	(4)
2002–2004	Zeta	63	(8)
2004–2007	Olympiacos	58	(3)
2007–2009	Gent	77	(16)
2010	VfL Bochum	21	(0)
2011–2012	Lierse	45	(5)
2012–2013	Lokeren	34	(6)
2013–2016	Waasland-Beveren	80	(5)
Total		408	(47)

International career
2004–2005	Serbia and Montenegro	7	(0)
Medal record
Silver medal – second place	UEFA Under-21 Championship	2004
- * Club domestic league appearances and goals

Miloš Marić (Serbian Cyrillic: Милош Марић; born 5 March 1982) is a Serbian football midfielder.

== Club career ==
He was released by Olympiacos in summer 2007. He rejoined to his former coach Trond Sollied at KAA Gent. On 9 January 2010, VfL Bochum signed Marić until June 2013. After one year with VfL Bochum, he announced his return to Belgium and signed for Lierse on 16 December 2010. He joined his third Belgian Pro League club during the 2012–13 summer transfer window by signing for Lokeren.

== International career ==
On the national level, Marić made his debut for Serbia and Montenegro in a July 2004 Kirin Cup match against Slovakia and earned a total of 7 caps (no goals). His final international was a September 2005 World Cup qualification match away against Spain.

== Career statistics ==
Club performance			League		Cup		Continental		Total	
Season	Club	League	Apps	Goals	Apps	Goals	Apps	Goals	Apps	Goals
Yugoslavia			League		Cup		Continental		Total	
1999–00	Sloboda Užice	Second League	7	0	0	0	0	0	7	0
2000–01	Remont Čačak	Second League	6	0	0	0	0	0	6	0
2001–02	Remont Čačak	Second League	18	4	0	0	0	0	18	4
2001–02	Zeta	First League	5	1	0	0	0	0	5	1
Serbia and Montenegro			League		Cup		Continental		Total	
2002–03	Zeta	First League	31	4	0	0	0	0	31	4
2003–04	Zeta	First League	27	3	0	0	0	0	27	3
Greece			League		Greek Cup		Europe		Total	
2004–05	Olympiacos	Alpha Ethniki	23	0	0	0	9	0	32	0
2005–06	Olympiacos	Alpha Ethniki	11	1	0	0	5	0	16	1
2006–07	Olympiacos	Superleague	23	1	0	0	6	0	29	1
Belgium			League		Belgian Cup		Europe		Total	
2007–08	Gent	First Division	29	4	0	0	0	0	29	4
2008–09	Gent	First Division	31	7	0	0	0	0	31	7
2009–10	Gent	First Division	16	6	0	0	4	0	20	6
Germany			League		DFB-Pokal		Europe		Total	
2009–10	VfL Bochum	Bundesliga	13	0	0	0	0	0	13	0
2010–11	VfL Bochum	2. Bundesliga	8	0	0	0	0	0	8	0
Belgium			League		Belgian Cup		Europe		Total	
2010–11	Lierse	Pro League	13	0	1	0	0	0	14	0
2011–12	Lierse	Pro League	26	4	5	2	0	0	31	6
2012–13	Lokeren	Pro League	26	6	1	0	2	0	29	6
			League		Cup		Continental		Total	
Total	Yugoslavia		36	5	0	0	0	0	36	5
Total	Serbia and Montenegro		58	7	0	0	0	0	58	7
Total	Greece		57	2	0	0	20	0	77	2
Total	Belgium		141	27	7	2	6	0	154	29
Total	Germany		21	0	0	0	0	0	21	0
Career total			313	41	7	2	26	0	346	43

== Honours ==
Olympiacos

- Greek Championship: 2005, 2006, 2007
- Greek Cup: 2005, 2006

Gent

- Belgian Cup: 2010
