= Nemanja Stanković =

Serbian footballer

Personal information
- Full name: Nemanja Stanković
- Date of birth: 8 August 1997 (age 29)
- Place of birth: Novi Sad, FR Yugoslavia
- Height: 1.81 m (5 ft 11 in)
- Position: Attacking midfielder

Team information
- Current team: Indeks Novi Sad

Youth career
- Vojvodina
- Donji Srem

Senior career*
Years	Team	Apps	(Gls)
2014–2015	Donji Srem	5	(0)
2016	Žilina II	7	(1)
2016–2017	Borac Čačak	17	(0)
2017	→ Polet Ljubić (loan)	3	(1)
2018–2019	Sesvete		
2019	Novi Sad		
2019	Bačka 1901		
2020-2021	Novi Sad		
2021	Cement Beočin		
2022-2023	Novi Sad		
2024	Sremac Vojka		
2024-	Indeks Novi Sad		
- * Club domestic league appearances and goals as of 12 February 2018

Nemanja Stanković (Serbian Cyrillic: Немања Станковић; born 8 August 1997) is a Serbian football midfielder who plays for Indeks Novi Sad.

== Career ==
In April 2018, Stanković joined Croatian club NK Sesvete. In February 2019, he joined RFK Novi Sad.
