= Miloš Milinović =

Serbian footballer

Personal information
- Full name: Miloš Milinović
- Date of birth: 12 July 1984 (age 42)
- Place of birth: Inđija, SFR Yugoslavia
- Height: 1.88 m (6 ft 2 in)
- Position: Goalkeeper

Senior career*
Years	Team	Apps	(Gls)
2002–2003	Vojvodina	0	(0)
2003–2004	Inđija	11	(0)
2004–2005	Radnički Nova Pazova	24	(0)
2005–2007	Novi Sad	54	(0)
2008–2009	ČSK Čelarevo	49	(0)
2009	→ Spartak Subotica (loan)	0	(0)
2010–2011	Borac Banja Luka	9	(0)
2012–2013	Inđija	48	(0)
2013–2014	Sloga Petrovac na Mlavi	29	(0)
2014	Donji Srem	9	(0)
2015–2016	Inđija	28	(0)
2016	Västanviks AIF	20	(0)
- * Club domestic league appearances and goals as of 9 January 2016

Miloš Milinović (Serbian Cyrillic: Милош Милиновић; born 12 July 1984) is a Serbian football goalkeeper who last played for Swedish club Västanviks AIF.
