= Aleksandar Janković (footballer, born 1995) =

Dutch footballer

Personal information
- Date of birth: 16 September 1995 (age 31)
- Place of birth: Rotterdam, Netherlands
- Height: 1.72 m (5 ft 8 in)
- Position: Midfielder

Team information
- Current team: Staphorst
- Number: 10

Youth career
- SC Feyenoord
- Sparta Rotterdam
- Feyenoord
- OFK Jankec Čačak
- Guča
- Borac Čačak
- Sloga Kraljevo
- 2011–2013: Groningen
- 2013–2014: ADO Den Haag

Senior career*
Years	Team	Apps	(Gls)
2014–2015	Radnički Kragujevac	1	(0)
2015–2017	De Graafschap	2	(0)
2017	Lokomotíva Zvolen	10	(0)
2017–2018	Sloboda Užice	7	(0)
2018	Achilles '29	15	(3)
2018–2019	De Treffers	25	(5)
2019–2020	VfB Oldenburg	8	(1)
2020	Atlas Delmenhorst	4	(2)
2021	Jedinstvo Ub		
2022–2023	ACV	25	(2)
2023–	Staphorst	30	(3)
- * Club domestic league appearances and goals as of 16:39, 8 November 2024 (UTC)

Aleksandar Janković (Serbian Cyrillic: Александар Јанковић; born 16 September 1995) is a Dutch footballer who plays as a midfielder for Staphorst.

== Career ==
=== Early career ===
Janković was born in Rotterdam, as son of Serbian father and Dutch mother originating from Cape Verde. He started in SC Feyenoord. At the age of 7 he moved to Sparta Rotterdam, but after a year returned to Feyenoord's youth school. He spent ages 10 to 16 in Serbia, playing for his father's club OFK Jankec Čačak, and later for FK Guča, Borac Čačak, and Sloga Kraljevo. After returning to the Netherlands, he played for Groningen's and ADO Den Haag's youth teams.

=== Radnički Kragujevac ===
Janković joined Radnički Kragujevac in summer of 2014. He made professional Jelen SuperLiga debut for the club Neško Milovanović on 22 November 2014, in a home match against Red Star Belgrade which ended 0–0 result under coach. He was substituted in for Dragan Milovanović in the 90th minute of the match.

== Career statistics ==
As of 26 November 2014

Appearances and goals by club, season and competition
Club	Season	League			Cup		Europe		Total	
Club	Season	Division	Apps	Goals	Apps	Goals	Apps	Goals	Apps	Goals
Jong ADO Den Haag	2013–14	Beloften Eredivisie	2	1	0	0	–		2	1
Radnički 1923	2014–15	SuperLiga	1	0	0	0	0	0	1	0
Career total			3	1	0	0	0	0	3	1
