= Nikola Milošević (footballer, born 1993) =

Serbian footballer

Personal information
- Full name: Nikola Milošević
- Date of birth: 8 June 1993 (age 33)
- Place of birth: Kruševac, FR Yugoslavia
- Height: 1.70 m (5 ft 7 in)
- Position: Central midfielder

Team information
- Current team: Jedinstvo 1936 Kruševac

Senior career*
Years	Team	Apps	(Gls)
2010–2014	Napredak Kruševac	85	(2)
2014	Sloboda Užice	7	(0)
2015	Mladost Lučani	1	(0)
2016	Temnić 1924	0	(0)
2016–2023	Trayal Kruševac	91	(1)
2024-	Jedinstvo 1936 Kruševac		
- * Club domestic league appearances and goals as of 18 March 2016

Nikola Milošević (Serbian Cyrillic: Никола Милошевић; born 8 June 1993) is a Serbian professional footballer who plays as a midfielder.

== Career ==
He made his debut for FK Napredak Kruševac on 13 March 2010 in a Serbian Superliga match versus Red Star Belgrade.

== Career statistics ==
As of 27 March 2015

Club	Season	League		Cup		Continental		Total	
Club	Season	Apps	Goals	Apps	Goals	Apps	Goals	Apps	Goals
Napredak Kruševac	2009–10	2	0	0	0	0	0	2	0
Napredak Kruševac	2010–11	21	1	0	0	0	0	21	1
Napredak Kruševac	2011–12	29	1	0	0	0	0	29	1
Napredak Kruševac	2012–13	26	0	1	0	0	0	27	0
Napredak Kruševac	2013–14	7	0	0	0	0	0	7	0
Napredak Kruševac	Total	85	2	2	0	0	0	87	2
Sloboda Užice	2014–15	7	0	2	0	0	0	9	0
Sloboda Užice	Total	7	0	2	0	0	0	9	0
Mladost Lučani	2014–15	1	0	0	0	0	0	1	0
Mladost Lučani	Total	1	0	0	0	0	0	1	0
Career total		93	3	3	0	0	0	106	3

== Honours ==
Napredak Kruševac

- Serbian First League: 2012–13
