= Branislav Čonka =

Serbian footballer

Personal information
- Full name: Branislav Čonka
- Date of birth: 28 January 1989 (age 37)
- Place of birth: Inđija, SFR Yugoslavia
- Height: 1.70 m (5 ft 7 in)
- Position: Midfielder

Youth career
- Partizan

Senior career*
Years	Team	Apps	(Gls)
2007–2009	Partizan	0	(0)
2007–2008	→ Teleoptik (loan)	19	(1)
2009–2010	Banat Zrenjanin	8	(0)
2010–2011	Sloboda Novi Kozarci	9	(1)
2011	→ Radnički Nova Pazova (loan)	11	(0)
2011–2012	Javor Ivanjica	3	(0)
2012	→ Rudar Kostolac (loan)	6	(0)
2012	Rudar Velenje	9	(1)
2013–2014	Inđija	4	(0)
2014–2015	Radnički Kragujevac	16	(0)
2016	Donji Srem		
2016	Jedinstvo Stara Pazova		
2017	Sopot		
2018	Landstrasser AC	12	(2)
2018-2019	SC Helfort 15	26	(5)
- * Club domestic league appearances and goals as of 14 June 2020

Branislav Čonka (Serbian Cyrillic: Бранислав Чонка; born 28 January 1989) is a Serbian retired football midfielder. He came through FK Partizan’s academy and played for clubs including Banat Zrenjanin, Rudar Velenje in Slovenia, Radnički Kragujevac, Donji Srem, and finished his career in Austria with SC Helfort 15 before retiring in 2019.
