= Dino Šarac =

Serbian footballer

Personal information
- Date of birth: 6 September 1990 (age 36)
- Place of birth: Novi Sad, SFR Yugoslavia
- Height: 1.76 m (5 ft 9 in)
- Position: Attacking midfielder

Team information
- Current team: FC Srbija Ulm
- Number: 2

Youth career
- Novi Sad

Senior career*
Years	Team	Apps	(Gls)
2008	OFK Bačka	12	(5)
2009	Metalac Futog	14	(2)
2009–2010	ČSK Čelarevo	28	(2)
2010–2011	Srem	29	(4)
2011–2014	Spartak Subotica	71	(3)
2014–2015	Donji Srem	23	(1)
2015–2016	Novi Pazar	28	(1)
2015–2017	Napredak Kruševac	23	(1)
2017–2018	OFK Bačka	21	(2)
2018–2019	Metalac	12	(1)
2019	Novi Pazar	7	(0)
2019–2020	Hajduk 1912		
2020–2021	Napredak Kruševac	11	(0)
2021	Sloga Kraljevo	13	(0)
2021	Rad	17	(1)
2022	OFK Bačka	12	(0)
2023–	FC Srbija Ulm	35	(4)
- * Club domestic league appearances and goals as of 31 May 2025

Dino Šarac (Serbian Cyrillic: Дино Шарац; born 6 September 1990) is a Serbian football midfielder who plays for German side FC Srbija Ulm.

== Career ==
After maturing in FK Novi Sad youth ranks, Šarac had two loan spells in Bačka from Bačka Palanka and Metalac Futog (both Serbian 3rd tier clubs). A year later he moved to second division team ČSK Čelarevo, then to Srem in the same league. In summer 2011 he joined Serbian SuperLiga club Spartak Subotica.

On 22 August 2019 Hajduk 1912 confirmed the signing of Šarac.
