= Filip Matović =

Serbian footballer

Personal information
- Full name: Filip Matović
- Date of birth: 6 February 1995 (age 31)
- Place of birth: Belgrade, FR Yugoslavia
- Height: 1.92 m (6 ft 4 in)
- Position: Centre-back

Youth career
- OFK Beograd

Senior career*
Years	Team	Apps	(Gls)
2013–2017	OFK Beograd	24	(1)
2014	→ Dinamo Pančevo (loan)	16	(0)
2017	Rad	0	(0)
2018	GSP Polet Dorćol		
2018–2019	Teleoptik	20	(1)
- * Club domestic league appearances and goals as of 16 February 2017

Filip Matović (Serbian Cyrillic: Филип Матовић; born 6 February 1995) is a Serbian retired footballer.

== Club career ==
=== OFK Beograd ===
Matović is a product of OFK Beograd's youth school. He signed a scholarship contract with the institution in 2012. In 2014, he signed his first professional contract along with his teammates Miloš Ostojić, Milan Gajić and Dejan Dražić. As a captain of a youth generation, he promoted in first team player. 2014 he spent in Serbian 3rd tier club Dinamo Pančevo, where he gained his first senior experience, and made 16 appearances. In the winter-break of the 2014–15 season, OFK Beograd brought him back to their squad. He made his professional debut for OFK Beograd in Serbian SuperLiga on 21 March 2015 in a home win against Borac Čačak. Matović scored his first goal for the club in the last fixture match of the 2014–15 Serbian SuperLiga campaign against Jagodina. Matović also stayed as a back-up choice during the 2015–16 campaign, having played 4 league matches as also a single cup appearance. After the club relegated to the Serbian First League, Matović had been elected for the club captain for the 2016–17 campaign. Next the end of contract with the club, Matović released in the mid-season.

=== Rad ===
In summer 2017, Matović joined Rad as a single player. He officially promoted in new club on 21 July same year, when he signed a three-year contract and was also ordered number 4 jersey. During the first half of the 2017–18 campaign, Matović failed to make any official appearance for Rad, after which both sides mutually terminated the contract and he left the club in the winter break off-season as a free agent. Later he moved to the Serbian League Belgrade side GSP Polet Dorćol.

== Career statistics ==
As of 16 February 2018

Appearances and goals by club, season and competition
Club	Season	League			Cup		Continental		Other		Total	
Club	Season	Division	Apps	Goals	Apps	Goals	Apps	Goals	Apps	Goals	Apps	Goals
Dinamo Pančevo (loan)	2013–14	Serbian League Vojvodina	8	0	—		—		—		8	0
Dinamo Pančevo (loan)	2014–15	Serbian League Vojvodina	8	0	—		—		—		8	0
Dinamo Pančevo (loan)	Total		16	0	—		—		—		16	0
OFK Beograd	2013–14	Serbian SuperLiga	0	0	0	0	—		—		0	0
OFK Beograd	2014–15	Serbian SuperLiga	8	0	—		—		—		8	0
OFK Beograd	2015–16	Serbian SuperLiga	4	1	1	0	—		—		5	1
OFK Beograd	2016–17	Serbian First League	12	0	0	0	—		—		12	0
OFK Beograd	Total		24	1	1	0	—		—		25	1
Rad	2017–18	Serbian SuperLiga	0	0	0	0	—		—		0	0
GSP Polet Dorćol	2017–18	Serbian League Belgrade	0	0	—		—		—		0	0
Career total			40	1	1	0	—		—		41	1
