= Abdul Rashid Obuobi =

Ghanaian footballer

Personal information
- Date of birth: 18 December 1994 (age 31)
- Place of birth: Accra, Ghana
- Height: 1.88 m (6 ft 2 in)
- Positions: Winger; left-back

Team information
- Current team: FC Ulaanbaatar

Senior career*
Years	Team	Apps	(Gls)
2012–2013	Accra New Town		
2014	Sloga Kraljevo	12	(1)
2014–2016	Donji Srem	15	(0)
2016–2019	Ventspils	40	(1)
2020	Borac Čačak	10	(0)
2021	Voždovac	3	(0)
2022	Zlatibor Čajetina	3	(0)
2022–	FC Ulaanbaatar		
- * Club domestic league appearances and goals as of 28 September 2021

Abdul Rashid Obuobi (born 18 December 1994) is a Ghanaian footballer. He is capable of playing as a winger, or full-back on the left flank.

== Club career ==
=== Sloga Kraljevo ===
Obuobi played with Accra New Town in his hometown Accra, before he joined Sloga Kraljevo in 2013-2014 winter break off-season. He arrived together with Nigerian Rueben Ogbonna Okoro and they were two Africans in Sloga footballers after a long time. Previously Victor Agbo played for Sloga in 2008. He has earned the right to play for Sloga in 3rd spring fixture and he scored a goal on that home win versus BSK Borča with result 4:1. He played total 12 matches until the end of competition, with 11 starts. He made good games on the beginning and continued with them, making chances in attack for him and other players. Teammates and supporters called him "Buba" (bug) in the meantime, shortly of his surname.

=== Donji Srem ===
He signed with Donji Srem in June 2014. He made his professional debut for Donji Srem and his Serbian SuperLiga debut on away lost 3:0 against Partizan on 24 August 2014 when he replaced Aleksandar Stanisavljević on 58 minute of match. Obuobi also made 5 Serbian First League appearances during the first half of 2015–16 season.

== Career statistics ==
As of 7 January 2018

Appearances and goals by club, season and competition
Club	Season	League			Cup		Continental		Other		Total	
Club	Season	Division	Apps	Goals	Apps	Goals	Apps	Goals	Apps	Goals	Apps	Goals
Sloga Kraljevo	2013–14	First League	12	1	—		—		—		12	1
Donji Srem	2014–15	SuperLiga	10	0	0	0	—		—		10	0
Donji Srem	2015–16	First League	5	0	0	0	—		—		5	0
Donji Srem	Total		15	0	0	0	—		—		15	0
Ventspils	2016	Higher League	9	1	2	0	2	0	—		13	1
Ventspils	2017	Higher League	19	0	2	0	1	0	—		22	0
Ventspils	Total		28	1	4	0	3	0	—		35	1
Career total			36	2	0	0	2	0	—		38	2

== Honours ==
Ventspils

- Latvian Football Cup: 2016–17
