= Ognjen Damnjanović =

Serbian footballer

Ognjen Damnjanović Огњен Дамњановић
Personal information
- Full name: Ognjen Damnjanović
- Date of birth: 20 April 1985 (age 41)
- Place of birth: Šabac, SFR Yugoslavia
- Height: 1.83 m (6 ft 0 in)
- Position: Centre forward

Youth career
- Partizan

Senior career*
Years	Team	Apps	(Gls)
2003–2004	Mačva Šabac	11	(2)
2004–2006	Elan	36	(14)
2005–2006	Sileks	3	(0)
2006–2008	Big Bull Bačinci	41	(11)
2007–2012	Proleter Novi Sad	102	(28)
2011–2012	Ironi Nir Ramat HaSharon	15	(2)
2012–2014	Donji Srem	58	(15)
2014	Voždovac	4	(0)
2015–2016	Napredak Kruševac	20	(6)
2016	Ironi Nir Ramat HaSharon	15	(0)
2016–2017	Mačva Šabac	10	(3)
2017–2019	TSC Bačka Topola	35	(10)
2019	Inđija	12	(0)
2019	Sloboda Užice		
- * Club domestic league appearances and goals as of 22 May 2019

Ognjen Damjanović (Serbian Cyrillic: Огњен Дамњановић; born 20 April 1985) is a Serbian football forward.

== Honours ==
Napredak Kruševac

- Serbian First League: 2015–16
