= Miloš Mijić =

Serbian footballer

Personal information
- Date of birth: 22 November 1989 (age 36)
- Place of birth: Zemun, SFR Yugoslavia
- Height: 1.75 m (5 ft 9 in)
- Position: Attacking midfielder

Team information
- Current team: Borac Čačak
- Number: 30

Senior career*
Years	Team	Apps	(Gls)
2007–2008	Radnički Nova Pazova	39	(1)
2009	Hajduk Beograd	5	(0)
2009–2011	Radnički Nova Pazova	50	(8)
2011–2013	OFK Beograd	41	(3)
2013	Domžale	13	(0)
2014	Donji Srem	14	(2)
2014–2015	Novi Pazar	30	(3)
2015	Mladost Lučani	14	(1)
2016–2017	Metalac Gornji Milanovac	47	(3)
2017–2018	Radnik Surdulica	10	(1)
2018	Sloboda Tuzla	12	(0)
2018–2020	Budućnost Podgorica	49	(11)
2020–2021	Napredak Kruševac	25	(2)
2021	Novi Pazar	16	(2)
2021–2022	Balzan	24	(6)
2022–2023	Novi Pazar	32	(5)
2023–2025	Spartak Subotica	63	(3)
2025	Mladost Lučani	1	(0)
2026–	Borac Čačak	13	(2)
- * Club domestic league appearances and goals as of 14 May 2026

Miloš Mijić (Serbian Cyrillic: Милош Мијић; born 22 November 1989) is a Serbian professional footballer who plays as a midfielder for Serbian First League club Borac Čačak.
