= Lazar Popović (footballer, born April 1993) =

Serbian footballer

Personal information
- Date of birth: 11 April 1993 (age 33)
- Place of birth: Raška, FR Yugoslavia
- Height: 1.88 m (6 ft 2 in)
- Position: Forward

Youth career
- Bane Raška

Senior career*
Years	Team	Apps	(Gls)
2009–2011	Bane Raška		
2012–2016	Radnički Kragujevac	29	(2)
2012–2013	→ Pobeda Beloševac (loan)	21	(5)
2014	→ Pobeda Beloševac (loan)	11	(4)
2016–2018	Lokomotiva Beograd		
2018	FAP		

International career^{‡}
2012	Serbia U19	1	(0)
- * Club domestic league appearances and goals as of 11 June 2016 ‡ National team caps and goals as of 17 September 2015

Lazar Popović (Serbian Cyrillic: Лазар Поповић; born 11 April 1993) is a Serbian football attacker who most recently played for FAP.

He was called to Serbia U19 national selection under coach Zoran Marić.
