= Uroš Sinđić =

Serbian footballer

Personal information
- Date of birth: 19 January 1986 (age 40)
- Place of birth: Titovo Užice, SFR Yugoslavia
- Height: 1.89 m (6 ft 2 in)
- Position: Defensive midfielder

Senior career*
Years	Team	Apps	(Gls)
2003–2005	Sloboda Užice	55	(7)
2006	Borac Čačak	0	(0)
2006–2008	Mladost Lučani	44	(0)
2008–2010	OFK Beograd	61	(4)
2011	Panserraikos	9	(0)
2011–2012	OFK Beograd	16	(0)
2012–2013	Voždovac	27	(3)
2013–2014	Donji Srem	23	(4)
2014–2017	Voždovac	59	(1)
2017–2020	Mladost Lučani	66	(0)
Total		360	(19)
- * Club domestic league appearances and goals as of 30 May 2020

Uroš Sinđić (Serbian Cyrillic: Урош Синђић; born 19 January 1986) is a Serbian retired footballer who played as a defensive midfielder.

== Career ==
In June 2017, Sinđić returned to Mladost Lučani after almost a decade. He helped the club reach the 2017–18 Serbian Cup final, eventually losing 2–1 to Partizan.

== Honours ==
Mladost Lučani

- Serbian First League: 2006–07
- Serbian Cup: Runner-up 2017–18
