= Zvezdan Đorđilović =

Serbian footballer (born 1994)

Personal information
- Date of birth: May 12, 1994 (age 32)
- Place of birth: Čačak, FR Yugoslavia
- Height: 1.79 m (5 ft 10 in)
- Position: Defender

Team information
- Current team: Polet Ljubić

Youth career
- Borac Čačak

Senior career*
Years	Team	Apps	(Gls)
- Borac Čačak
2014	Polet Ljubić		
2015	Sloga Požega		
2015–2016	Borac Banja Luka	5	(0)
2016	Drina Zvornik	1	(0)
2016–2017	Montego Bay United	10	(0)
2017	Pobeda	9	(0)
2017	Sloboda Tuzla	14	(0)
2018	FK Älmeboda/Linneryd	6	(2)
2018–2020	Sloga Požega		
2020–2021	Borac Čačak	30	(2)
2021	Rudar Prijedor		
2022	Sloboda Užice		
2022–2023	Borac Čačak		
2023–	Polet Ljubić		
- * Club domestic league appearances and goals

Zvezdan Đorđilović (born 12 May 1994) is a Serbian footballer. Besides Serbia, he has played in Bosnia and Herzegovina, North Macedonia, and Jamaica.

== Career ==
In 2015, he signed for FK Borac Banja Luka.

Registering with Montego Bay United's 2016/17 lineup through fellow Serbian coach Slaviša Božičić to gain experience, Đorđilović first started away at Reno, heading back to Serbia the second half of the season. Positioned on the left side with MoBay, the Serb stated that football clubs in his home country are more organized, and that he and Božičić were part of a plan improve Montego Bay's structure. He also recalled that there were around 8000 spectators each game, and that the locals were phlegmatic and relaxed.

In 2017, he signed for FK Sloboda Tuzla.

In 2020, he signed for FK Borac Čačak.
