= Abubakar Moro =

Ghanaian professional footballer (born 1991)

Personal information
- Full name: Abubakar Moro
- Date of birth: 17 August 1991 (age 35)
- Place of birth: Accra, Ghana
- Height: 1.74 m (5 ft 8 1/2 in)
- Position: Midfielder

Youth career
- Tudu Mighty Jets

Senior career*
Years	Team	Apps	(Gls)
2009–2014	Hearts of Oak	84	(1)
2014–2015	Donji Srem	19	(0)

International career^{‡}
2013–	Ghana	1	(0)
- * Club domestic league appearances and goals as of 28 May 2015 ‡ National team caps and goals as of 23 August 2014

Abubakar Moro (born 17 August 1991) is a Ghanaian professional footballer who plays for FK Donji Srem in the Serbian SuperLiga

== Career ==
Moro Abubakar has played for several Ghanaian teams and has been playing as a midfielder at Hearts of Oak in the Ghana Premier League where he made 84 appearances and scored 1 goal between 2010 and 2013, although he played with Hearts of Oak between 2009 and 2014. Moro became part of the 2011–12 Ghanaian Premier League team of the season.

On September 12, 2014, he arrived to Serbia and signed a 3-year contract with Serbian SuperLiga side FK Donji Srem and was attributed a shirt number 50 (shortly afterwards changed to number 5). He made his debut in the SuperLiga as a starter in the round 6 match against FK Čukarički in a 1–1 draw.

== International career ==
In November 2013, coach Maxwell Konadu invited him to be a part of the Ghana squad for the 2013 WAFU Nations Cup. He helped the team to a first-place finish after Ghana beat Senegal by three goals to one.

He has one appearance for main Ghana national team in the friendly match played against Libya on August 30, 2013.

== Honours ==
- Ghana Premier League: 2011–12 team of the season
