= Vladimir Jašić =

Serbian footballer (born 1984)

Personal information
- Full name: Vladimir Jašić
- Date of birth: January 4, 1984 (age 42)
- Place of birth: Bajina Bašta, SFR Yugoslavia
- Height: 1.82 m (6 ft 0 in)
- Position: Full-back

Senior career*
Years	Team	Apps	(Gls)
2002–2007	Borac Čačak	81	(1)
2003–2004	→ Remont Čačak (loan)	5	(0)
2007–2008	ČSK Čelarevo	10	(0)
2007–2008	→ Voždovac (loan)	13	(0)
2008–2010	Mladi Radnik	41	(0)
2010–2011	Vllaznia	27	(0)
2012	Javor Ivanjica	9	(0)
2012–2014	Voždovac	56	(0)
2014–2015	Radnički Kragujevac	18	(0)
2015	London City		
2016	Voždovac	0	(0)
- * Club domestic league appearances and goals

Vladimir Jašić (Serbian Cyrillic: Владимир Јашић; born 4 January 1984) is a Serbian retired footballer.

== Playing career ==
Jašić began his career in 2002 in the First League of FR Yugoslavia with FK Borac Čačak. During his tenure with Čačak he was loaned to the Second League of FR Yugoslavia in 2003 with play with FK Remont Čačak. After several seasons with Borac he signed with FK ČSK Čelarevo in the Serbian First League. In 2008, he returned to the Serbian SuperLiga to play with FK Mladi Radnik. He went abroad in 2010 in order to play in the Albanian Superliga with KF Vllaznia Shkodër.

After a season in Albania he returned to Serbia to play with Javor Ivanjica, FK Voždovac, and Radnicki Kragujevac. In 2015, he went overseas to play in the Canadian Soccer League with London City. The following season he returned to Voždovac to play in the Prva Liga.
