= Nemanja Krznarić =

Serbian footballer and coach

Personal information
- Full name: Nemanja Krznarić
- Date of birth: 29 May 1984 (age 42)
- Place of birth: Čačak, SFR Yugoslavia
- Height: 1.92 m (6 ft 3 1/2 in)
- Position: Goalkeeper

Team information
- Current team: Mladost Lučani (GK coach)

Senior career*
Years	Team	Apps	(Gls)
2001–2002	Remont Čačak	12	(0)
2003–2008	Borac Čačak	6	(0)
2004	→ Remont Čačak (loan)	2	(0)
2006–2007	→ Metalac Gornji Milanovac (loan)	1	(0)
2007–2008	→ Mladi Radnik (loan)	24	(0)
2008–2011	Mladost Lučani	102	(0)
2012–2014	Napredak Kruševac	73	(0)
2014–2017	Mladost Lučani	99	(0)
2017–2018	Radnički Niš	2	(0)
2018–2019	Mladost Lučani	2	(0)
Total		323	(0)

Managerial career
- 2019–: Mladost Lučani (GK coach)
- * Club domestic league appearances and goals

Nemanja Krznarić (Serbian Cyrillic: Немања Крзнарић; born 29 May 1984) is a Serbian football coach and a former goalkeeper. He is the goalkeepers coach at Mladost Lučani.

== Honours ==
Napredak

- Serbian First League: 2012–13
