= Lazar Mitrović (footballer, born 1993) =

Serbian footballer

Personal information
- Full name: Lazar Mitrović
- Date of birth: 27 May 1993 (age 33)
- Place of birth: Smederevska Palanka, FR Yugoslavia
- Height: 1.84 m (6 ft 0 in)
- Position: Left wing

Youth career
- Red Star Belgrade

Senior career*
Years	Team	Apps	(Gls)
2011–2016	Red Star Belgrade	0	(0)
2011–2013	→ Sopot (loan)	17	(2)
2014–2015	→ Sopot (loan)	6	(1)
2016–	BSK Borča	3	(0)
- * Club domestic league appearances and goals as of 27 June 2016

Lazar Mitrović (Serbian Cyrillic: Лазар Митровић; 27 May 1993) is a Serbian football midfielder.

== Career ==
=== Red Star Belgrade ===
Born in Smederevska Palanka, Mitrović passed Red Star Belgrade youth categories and later was loaned to Sopot, between 2011 and 2013. In summer 2013, Mitrović signed his first four-year professional contract with Red Star, but he missed the whole 2013–14 season because of injury. After recovering he was loaned to Sopot again, for a season. He signed a contract termination and left the club in 2016.

=== BSK Borča ===
For the rest of the 2015–16 season, Mitrović joined BSK Borča. During the spring half of the season, Mitrović made 3 appearances, against Bežanija, Napredak Kruševac, and Sloboda Užice in the last fixture of the competition.

== Career statistics ==
As of 26 October 2016

Club	Season	League			Cup		Continental		Other		Total	
Club	Season	Division	Apps	Goals	Apps	Goals	Apps	Goals	Apps	Goals	Apps	Goals
Red Star Belgrade	2011–12	Serbian SuperLiga	0	0	0	0	0	0	–	–	0	0
Red Star Belgrade	2012–13	Serbian SuperLiga	0	0	0	0	0	0	–	–	0	0
Red Star Belgrade	2013–14	Serbian SuperLiga	0	0	0	0	0	0	–	–	0	0
Red Star Belgrade	2014–15	Serbian SuperLiga	0	0	0	0	–	–	–	–	0	0
Red Star Belgrade	2015–16	Serbian SuperLiga	0	0	0	0	0	0	–	–	0	0
Red Star Belgrade	Total		0	0	0	0	0	0	–	–	0	0
Sopot (loan)	2012–13	Serbian League Belgrade	17	2	–	–	–	–	–	–	17	2
Sopot (loan)	2014–15	Serbian League Belgrade	6	1	–	–	–	–	–	–	6	1
Sopot (loan)	Total		23	3	–	–	–	–	–	–	23	3
BSK Borča	2015–16	Serbian First League	3	0	–	–	–	–	–	–	3	0
BSK Borča	2016–17	Serbian First League	0	0	0	0	–	–	–	–	0	0
BSK Borča	Total		3	0	0	0	–	–	–	–	3	0
Career total			26	3	0	0	0	0	–	–	26	3
