= Đorđe Lazović (footballer, born 1990) =

Serbian footballer

Personal information
- Full name: Đorđe Lazović
- Date of birth: 1 October 1990 (age 36)
- Place of birth: Čačak, SFR Yugoslavia
- Height: 1.73 m (5 ft 8 in)
- Position: Full-back

Team information
- Current team: Zadrugar Donja Trepča

Youth career
- Borac Čačak

Senior career*
Years	Team	Apps	(Gls)
2009–2010	Sloga Požega	22	(0)
2010–2014	Mladost Lučani	67	(1)
2014	Kolubara	11	(0)
2015	Borac Čačak	1	(0)
2016	Sloboda Užice		
2016–2017	Jedinstvo Užice		
2017	Polet Ljubić		
2018	Šumadija Aranđelovac		
2018-2019	Tutin		
2019-2020	Borac Čačak		
2020-2021	Slatina		
2021-2023	Omladinac Zablaće		
2023-	Zadrugar Donja Trepča		
- * Club domestic league appearances and goals as of 29 August 2015

Đorđe Lazović (Serbian Cyrillic: Ђорђе Лазовић; born 1 October 1990) is a Serbian football defender.

== Career ==
=== Sloga Požega ===
Born in Čačak, after youth career in Borac, Lazović joined Sloga Požega, where he made 22 caps for the 2009–10 season.

=== Mladost Lučani ===
For the 2010–11 season, Lazović signed with Serbian First League club Mladost Lučani, where he spent four seasons. For the first season he made 11 appearances, mostly as a backup player. In 2011–12 season, he was more standard, playing 16 matches and scored 1 goal against Inđija. For 2012–13 and 2013–14 he played 20 league matches at each, and he also played 1 cup match, against OFK Beograd in 2013–14 season. After winning the Serbian First League with Mladost Lučani, and promotion in Serbian SuperLiga at the end 2013–14 of season, he left the club.

=== Kolubara ===
First half of 2014–15 season, Lazović spent with Serbian First League club Kolubara, where he played 11 matches.

=== Borac Čačak ===
Lazović returned in his home club in January 2015, but he didn't play for the spring half of 2014–15 season. He made his SuperLiga debut in the 8th fixture of 2015–16, against Jagodina, replacing Vladimir Krstić before the end of match.

== Career statistics ==
As of 29 August 2015

Club performance			League		Cup		Continental		Total	
Season	Club	League	Apps	Goals	Apps	Goals	Apps	Goals	Apps	Goals
Serbia			League		Serbian Cup		Europe		Total	
2009–10	Sloga Požega	League West	22	0	–				22	0
2010–11	Mladost Lučani	First League	11	0	–				11	0
2011–12	Mladost Lučani	First League	16	1	–				16	1
2012–13	Mladost Lučani	First League	20	0	–				20	0
2013–14	Mladost Lučani	First League	20	0	1	0	–		21	0
2014–15	Kolubara	First League	11	0	–				11	0
2015–16	Borac Čačak	SuperLiga	1	0	0	0	–		1	0
Total	Serbia		101	1	1	0	0	0	102	1
Career total			101	1	1	0	0	0	102	1

== Honours ==
Mladost

- Serbian First League: 2013–14
