= Marko Adamović =

Serbian footballer

Marko Adamović Марко Адамовић
Personal information
- Full name: Marko Adamović
- Date of birth: 11 March 1991 (age 35)
- Place of birth: Ub, SFR Yugoslavia
- Height: 1.77 m (5 ft 10 in)
- Position: Attacking midfielder

Team information
- Current team: Jedinstvo Ub
- Number: 7

Youth career
- Partizan

Senior career*
Years	Team	Apps	(Gls)
2008–2009	Jedinstvo Ub	39	(8)
2010–2012	Spartak Subotica	67	(3)
2013	Rad	25	(0)
2014	Radnički Kragujevac	11	(1)
2014–2016	Voždovac	43	(3)
2016–2017	Karmiotissa	31	(6)
2017	Hapoel Ra'anana	0	(0)
2017–2018	Beroe	19	(0)
2018–2021	AEL Limassol	54	(4)
2021–2022	Doxa Katokopias	11	(0)
2022–	Jedinstvo Ub	47	(4)

International career
2010	Serbia U19	2	(0)
- * Club domestic league appearances and goals as of 26 December 2023

Marko Adamović (Serbian Cyrillic: Марко Адамовић; born 11 March 1991) is a Serbian footballer who plays as a midfielder for Jedinstvo Ub.

== Career ==
On 11 September 2017, Adamović signed with Bulgarian club Beroe. In June, he joined Cypriot First Division side AEL Limassol for an undisclosed fee.
