= Miloš Džugurdić =

Serbian footballer

Personal information
- Full name: Miloš Džugurdić
- Date of birth: 2 December 1992 (age 33)
- Place of birth: Kruševac, FR Yugoslavia
- Height: 1.79 m (5 ft 10 1/2 in)
- Position: Forward

Team information
- Current team: Inđija

Youth career
- Partizan

Senior career*
Years	Team	Apps	(Gls)
2011–2013	Teleoptik	60	(9)
2013–2014	Spartak Subotica	23	(1)
2014–2015	Voždovac	19	(2)
2015	Mladost Lučani	0	(0)
2016–2017	BSK Borča	15	(1)
2017	Olimpik	5	(1)
2017	Skopje	10	(2)
2018	Borac Čačak	2	(1)
2018–2019	Grbalj	24	(5)
2019–2020	Grafičar Beograd	9	(1)
2020–2021	Jagodina	3	(0)
2022	Napredak Kruševac	13	(1)
2024-	Inđija		
- * Club domestic league appearances and goals as of 01:21, 25 January 2020 (UTC)

Miloš Džugurdić (Serbian Cyrillic: Милош Џугурдић; born 2 December 1992) is a Serbian football forward who plays for Inđija.
