= Lazar Cvetković =

Serbian footballer

Personal information
- Date of birth: 13 October 1995 (age 31)
- Place of birth: Jagodina, FR Yugoslavia
- Height: 1.83 m (6 ft 0 in)
- Position: Defensive midfielder

Team information
- Current team: SV Lackenbach
- Number: 22

Youth career
- Jagodina

Senior career*
Years	Team	Apps	(Gls)
2013–2016	Jagodina	1	(0)
2014–2016	→ Tabane Trgovački (loan)	21	(1)
2016	Tabane Trgovački		
2017	ASV Draßburg	9	(0)
2017–2021	SC Ritzing	77	(25)
2021	Jagodina		
2022–2023	SC Ritzing	59	(18)
2024-	SV Lackenbach	13	(3)
- * Club domestic league appearances and goals as of 6 June 2024

Lazar Cvetković (Serbian Cyrillic: Лазар Цветковић; born 13 October 1995) is a Serbian football midfielder who plays for Austrian lower league side SV Lackenbach.

== Career ==
=== Jagodina ===
Cvetković was loaned to OFK Tabane for the second half of 2013–14. He made 11 league appearances and scored 1 goal until the end of season. Cvetković also played for Tabane in the 2014–15 season. After Jagodina's decision to rejuvenate the team, Cvetković returned from loan. He made his professional debut for Jagodina in 2nd fixture of 2015–16 Serbian SuperLiga, against Partizan. Next, he was loaned to Tabane again.
