= Bismarck Appiah =

Ghanaian footballer

Personal information
- Full name: Bismarck Nhyra Appiah
- Date of birth: 19 January 1995 (age 31)
- Place of birth: Ghana
- Height: 1.85 m (6 ft 1 in)
- Position: Forward

Team information
- Current team: Mladost DG (on loan from Arsenal Tivat)
- Number: 18

Senior career*
Years	Team	Apps	(Gls)
2013–2015	Sloga Petrovac na Mlavi	41	(6)
2015–2016	Gaborone United		
2016	Proleter Novi Sad	0	(0)
2017	OFK Bačka	13	(1)
2017–2018	Mladost Lučani	0	(0)
2018–2019	Jimma Aba Jifar		
2020–2022	Tataouine		
2022–2023	Hilal Alsahil SC		
2023–2024	Rudar Pljevlja	27	(5)
2024–	Arsenal Tivat	14	(1)
2025–	→ Mladost DG (loan)	3	(1)
- * Club domestic league appearances and goals as of 3 April 2025

Bismarck Nhyra Appiah (born 19 January 1995) is a Ghanaian professional footballer who plays as a forward for Mladost DG, on loan from Arsenal Tivat in Montenegro.

== Career ==
He made his professional debut in the season 2013–14 when he joined Serbian First League side Sloga Petrovac na Mlavi. After playing two seasons with Sloga in Serbian second tier, Appiah returned to Africa and joined Gaborone United playing in Botswana Premier League. He was released by Gaborone Utd. in January 2016.

In summer 2016 he returned to Serbia and joined second-tier side Proleter Novi Sad, and on winter break that season he moved to top-tier Serbian side OFK Bačka. He made his debut in the 2016–17 Serbian SuperLiga in a 23rd-round game of Bačka home against Red Star Belgrade. On 11 June 2017, Appiah signed with Mladost Lučani.
