= Aleksa Denković =

Serbian footballer

Personal information
- Full name: Aleksa Denković
- Date of birth: 21 March 1997 (age 29)
- Place of birth: Belgrade, FR Yugoslavia
- Height: 1.85 m (6 ft 1 in)
- Position: Left winger

Youth career
- Partizan
- 2014–2016: OFK Beograd

Senior career*
Years	Team	Apps	(Gls)
2015–2017	OFK Beograd	19	(1)
2018	TSC Bačka Topola	6	(0)
2019	Sinđelić Beograd	7	(0)
2019–2020	Budućnost Dobanovci	20	(0)
2020	OFK Beograd		
2021	Hajduk Divoš		
2021	Prva Iskra Barič		
2022	Tutin		
2022	Budućnost Dobanovci		
2023	Hajduk Beška		
2023-	Sremac Deč		

International career
2015	Serbia U19	1	(0)
- * Club domestic league appearances and goals as of 2 October 2020

Aleksa Denković (Serbian Cyrillic: Алекса Денковић; born 21 March 1997) is a Serbian football midfielder.

== Club career ==
=== OFK Beograd ===
As a member of Partizan youth, Denković joined OFK Beograd in summer 2014, together with his teammate from 1997 generation, Nemanja Belaković. After a season with youth team, he joined the first team of OFK Beograd for the 2015–16 season and made his SuperLiga debut in the 9th fixture, against Jagodina. He scored his first senior goal in 11 fixture match of the same season against Spartak Subotica, played on 26 September 2015.

== Career statistics ==
As of 24 April 2017

Club	Season	League			Cup		Continental		Other		Total	
Club	Season	Division	Apps	Goals	Apps	Goals	Apps	Goals	Apps	Goals	Apps	Goals
OFK Beograd	2015–16	Serbian SuperLiga	5	1	1	0	—		—		6	1
OFK Beograd	2016–17	Serbian First League	14	0	1	0	—		—		15	0
OFK Beograd	Total		19	1	2	0	—		—		21	1
