= Victor Agbo =

Nigerian footballer (born 1980)

Personal information
- Full name: Victor Ikechukwu Agbo
- Date of birth: December 19, 1980 (age 45)
- Place of birth: Lagos, Nigeria
- Height: 1.81 m (5 ft 11 1/2 in)
- Position: Forward

Senior career*
Years	Team	Apps	(Gls)
2001–2002	BSK Borča	11	(3)
2002	Žitorađa	1	(0)
2003	Rudar Ugljevik	12	(1)
2005	Grafičar Beograd	6	(0)
2005–2006	Novi Pazar	30	(5)
2006–2007	Grbalj	25	(5)
2007–2008	Mladost Apatin	3	(0)
2008	→ Sloga Kraljevo (loan)	6	(0)
2008–2009	Šumadija Aranđelovac		
2009–2010	Rudar Kostolac	22	(6)
2011	Jagodina	0	(0)
2012	Šećeranac		
2013	Hajduk Veljko		
- * Club domestic league appearances and goals

Victor Ikechukwu Agbo (born December 19, 1980) is a Nigerian retired footballer who played as a forward.

== Career ==
He spent most of his career in Serbia where he represented several top and lower league clubs, namely FK BSK Borča, RFK Grafičar Beograd, FK Novi Pazar, FK Mladost Apatin, FK Sloga Kraljevo, FK Šumadija Aranđelovac and FK Rudar Kostolac. Beside these, he also played with Bosnian Serb club FK Rudar Ugljevik in the Premier League of Bosnia and Herzegovina and with OFK Grbalj in the Montenegrin First League. He last played with FK Hajduk Veljko in the Serbian League East.

In September 2018 he became the director of the newly inaugurated Football Academy Benson in Jagodina.
