= Mladen Sarajlin =

Serbian footballer

Personal information
- Full name: Mladen Sarajlin
- Date of birth: 17 April 1995 (age 31)
- Place of birth: Vršac, FR Yugoslavia
- Height: 1.87 m (6 ft 2 in)
- Position: Second striker

Youth career
- Partizan

Senior career*
Years	Team	Apps	(Gls)
2013–2014	Teleoptik	4	(0)
2013–2014	→ Partizan (loan)	0	(0)
2014–2015	OFK Beograd	3	(1)
2015	→ Kolubara (loan)	0	(0)
2016–2017	Napredak Kruševac	7	(0)
- * Club domestic league appearances and goals

Mladen Sarajlin (Serbian Cyrillic: Младен Сарајлин; born 17 April 1995) is a Serbian football forward.

== Honours ==
Napredak Kruševac

- Serbian First League: 2015–16
