= Nenad R. Cvetković =

Serbian footballer

Personal information
- Full name: Nenad Cvetković
- Date of birth: 3 January 1996 (age 30)
- Place of birth: Užice, FR Yugoslavia
- Height: 1.84 m (6 ft 0 in)
- Positions: Midfielder; defender

Team information
- Current team: Jedinstvo Užice
- Number: 19

Youth career
- Sloboda Užice
- 2014–2015: → Čukarički (loan)

Senior career*
Years	Team	Apps	(Gls)
2015	Sloboda Užice	0	(0)
2016	Zlatibor Čajetina	14	(0)
2017	Sloboda Užice	4	(0)
2017–2018	Jedinstvo Užice		
2018-2019	OFK Mihajlovac		
2019–2022	Jedinstvo Užice		
2022–2023	Sevojno		
2023–	Jedinstvo Užice		
- * Club domestic league appearances and goals as of 16 June 2017

Nenad Cvetković (Serbian Cyrillic: Ненад Цветковић; born 3 January 1996) is a Serbian footballer, playing for Radnički Sremska Mitrovica.

== Club career ==
Born in Užice, Cvetković passed youth categories of the local club Sloboda. In summer 2014, he moved on loan to Čukarički, where he stayed until the end of 2014–15 season in Serbian youth league. After he overgrown U19 level, Cvetković returned to his home club where he stayed until the end of 2015. Later, Cvetković spent the whole 2016 playing with Zlatibor Čajetina in the Drina Zone League and Serbian League West. At the beginning of 2017, Cvetković returned to Sloboda. He made his debut for the club in 18 fixture match of the 2016–17 Serbian First League season, against Zemun.

== Career statistics ==
=== Club ===
As of 16 June 2017

Club	Season	League			Cup		Continental		Other		Total	
Club	Season	Division	Apps	Goals	Apps	Goals	Apps	Goals	Apps	Goals	Apps	Goals
Zlatibor Čajetina	2015–16	Drina Zone League	11	0	—		—		—		11	0
Zlatibor Čajetina	2016–17	Serbian League West	3	0	—		—		—		3	0
Zlatibor Čajetina	Total		14	0	—		—		—		14	0
Sloboda Užice	2015–16	Serbian First League	0	0	0	0	—		—		0	0
Sloboda Užice	2016–17	Serbian First League	4	0	1	0	—		—		5	0
Sloboda Užice	Total		4	0	1	0	—		—		5	0
Career total			18	0	1	0	—		—		19	0

== Honours ==
Zlatibor Čajetina

- Drina Zone League: 2015–16

== Personal life ==
Nenad is a twin brother of defender Nemanja Cvetković. He is also referred as Nenad R. Cvetković sometimes, to make a difference for other player with the same name, Nenad N. Cvetković, three days younger footballer, also born in Užice.
