= Marko Mrkić =

Serbian footballer

Personal information
- Full name: Marko Mrkić
- Date of birth: 20 August 1996 (age 30)
- Place of birth: Niš, FR Yugoslavia
- Height: 1.83 m (6 ft 0 in)
- Position: Striker

Youth career
- Radnički Niš
- Jagodina

Senior career*
Years	Team	Apps	(Gls)
2014–2018	Radnički Niš	99	(16)
2020	Napredak Kruševac	12	(2)
2023	Kolubara	4	(1)

International career^{‡}
2012	Serbia U16		
2016	Serbia U20	1	(0)
2018	Serbia U23	1	(0)
2017	Serbia	1	(0)
- * Club domestic league appearances and goals as of 15 June 2023 ‡ National team caps and goals as of 15 October 2018

Marko Mrkić (Serbian Cyrillic: Марко Мркић; born 20 August 1996) is a Serbian retired footballer. He is a son of Saša Mrkić.

He played for hometown club Radnički Niš and had short spells at Napredak Kruševac and Kolubara.

== International career ==
Mrkić was called up to the Serbia national football team by coach Slavoljub Muslin in January 2017. On 29 January 2017, Mrkić made his international debut for the Serbia national football team in a friendly match against the United States in a 0–0 away draw in San Diego, coming on as a 64th-minute substitute for Aleksandar Paločević
