= Srđan Grujičić =

Serbian footballer

Personal information
- Full name: Srđan Grujičić
- Date of birth: 19 July 1987 (age 39)
- Place of birth: Belgrade, SFR Yugoslavia
- Height: 1.71 m (5 ft 7 1/2 in)
- Position: Midfielder

Team information
- Current team: Strelac Mislođin

Senior career*
Years	Team	Apps	(Gls)
2005–2012	Radnički Obrenovac	155	(21)
2011	→ Radnički Kragujevac (loan)	16	(1)
2012	Jedinstvo Užice	16	(4)
2013–2014	Čukarički	21	(0)
2014	→ Kolubara (loan)	13	(0)
2014	Donji Srem	11	(0)
2015	Sloboda Užice	14	(1)
2015–2016	Slavija Sarajevo	23	(0)
2016–2020	Prva Iskra		
- * Club domestic league appearances and goals as of 23 May 2016

Srđan Grujičić (Serbian Cyrillic: Срђан Грујичић; born 19 July 1987) is a Serbian football midfielder who plays for Strelac Mislođin.
