= Vladimir Radivojević =

Serbian footballer (born 1986)

Personal information
- Full name: Vladimir Radivojević
- Date of birth: 4 February 1986 (age 40)
- Place of birth: Loznica, SR Serbia, SFR Yugoslavia
- Height: 1.82 m (6 ft 0 in)
- Position: Midfielder

Senior career*
Years	Team	Apps	(Gls)
2004–2008	Loznica	66	(10)
2008–2009	Borac Čačak	0	(0)
2009	→ Radnički Klupci (loan)	13	(4)
2009–2011	Mladost Lučani	59	(10)
2012–2013	Javor Ivanjica	53	(9)
2014	Rad	14	(0)
2014–2016	Novi Pazar	57	(11)
2016–2024	Mladost Lučani	237	(32)
- * Club domestic league appearances and goals as of 8 June 2024

Vladimir Radivojević (Serbian Cyrillic: Владимир Радивојевић; born 4 February 1986) is a Serbian professional footballer who plays as a midfielder.

== Career ==
In the summer of 2009, Radivojević was acquired by Serbian First League club Mladost Lučani. He played regularly for the side over the next two seasons, scoring 10 league goals in 59 appearances. In the summer of 2011, after refusing to sign a new contract with the club, Radivojević was ejected from his hotel accommodation and required to attend training sessions separately from the rest of the team.

In June 2016, Radivojević returned to Mladost Lučani. He helped the club earn a spot in the 2017–18 UEFA Europa League qualifiers and reach the 2017–18 Serbian Cup final. During the 2018–19 Serbian SuperLiga, Radivojević scored a career-high 10 goals in 34 appearances.

== Career statistics ==
As of 8 June 2024

Appearances and goals by club, season and competition
Club	Season	League			Cup		Continental		Total	
Club	Season	Division	Apps	Goals	Apps	Goals	Apps	Goals	Apps	Goals
Javor Ivanjica	2011–12	Serbian SuperLiga	13	1	0	0	—		13	1
Javor Ivanjica	2012–13	Serbian SuperLiga	27	7	4	2	—		31	9
Javor Ivanjica	2013–14	Serbian SuperLiga	13	1	1	0	—		14	1
Javor Ivanjica	Total		53	9	5	2	—		58	11
Rad	2013–14	Serbian SuperLiga	14	0	0	0	—		14	0
Novi Pazar	2014–15	Serbian SuperLiga	23	6	1	0	—		24	6
Novi Pazar	2015–16	Serbian SuperLiga	34	5	1	0	—		35	5
Novi Pazar	Total		57	11	2	0	—		59	11
Mladost Lučani	2016–17	Serbian SuperLiga	33	5	3	0	—		36	5
Mladost Lučani	2017–18	Serbian SuperLiga	30	7	5	0	2	0	37	7
Mladost Lučani	2018–19	Serbian SuperLiga	34	10	4	0	—		38	10
Mladost Lučani	2019–20	Serbian SuperLiga	26	4	1	0	—		27	4
Mladost Lučani	2020–21	Serbian SuperLiga	36	0	1	0	—		37	0
Mladost Lučani	2021–22	Serbian SuperLiga	27	2	1	0	—		28	2
Mladost Lučani	2022–23	Serbian SuperLiga	29	4	1	0	—		30	4
Mladost Lučani	2023–24	Serbian SuperLiga	22	0	1	0	—		23	0
Mladost Lučani	Total		237	32	17	0	2	0	256	32
Career total			361	52	24	2	2	0	387	54

== Honours ==
Mladost Lučani

- Serbian Cup: Runner-up 2017–18
