= Slobodan Janković (footballer, born 1981) =

Serbian footballer

Personal information
- Full name: Slobodan Janković
- Date of birth: 29 August 1981 (age 45)
- Place of birth: Valjevo, SFR Yugoslavia
- Height: 1.87 m (6 ft 1 1/2 in)
- Position: Goalkeeper

Team information
- Current team: Napredak Kruševac (goalkeeper coach)

Senior career*
Years	Team	Apps	(Gls)
2001–2004	Budućnost Valjevo		
2004–2005	Železničar Beograd	48	(0)
2006	Budućnost Dobanovci	16	(0)
2006–2007	Bežanija	6	(0)
2008	Železničar Beograd	1	(0)
2009	→ BSK Borča (loan)	0	(0)
2009–2010	BSK Borča	19	(0)
2011–2012	Napredak Kruševac	19	(0)
2012–2014	Mladost Lučani	55	(0)
2014–2019	Napredak Kruševac	24	(0)
- * Club domestic league appearances and goals

Slobodan Janković (Serbian Cyrillic: Слободан Јанковић; born 29 August 1981) is a Serbian retired football goalkeeper and current goalkeeper coach of Napredak Kruševac.

== Career ==
=== Coaching career ===
After retiring at the end of 2019, Janković was appointed goalkeeper coach of his last club, Napredak Kruševac in January 2020.

== Honours ==
Mladost Lučani

- Serbian First League: 2013–14

Napredak Kruševac

- Serbian First League: 2015–16
