= Marko Avramović (footballer) =

Serbian footballer

Personal information
- Date of birth: 2 April 1987 (age 39)
- Place of birth: Lučani, SFR Yugoslavia
- Height: 1.86 m (6 ft 1 in)
- Position: Midfielder

Senior career*
Years	Team	Apps	(Gls)
2004–2008	Mladost Lučani	75	(6)
2009–2010	Jagodina	13	(1)
2010	→ Banat Zrenjanin (loan)	13	(1)
2010–2014	Mladost Lučani	109	(8)
2015	Sloboda Užice	7	(0)
2017	Sloga Požega		
2016	Dinamo Vranje	11	(0)
2016	Bokelj	10	(0)
2017	Polet Ljubić		
- * Club domestic league appearances and goals

Marko Avramović (Serbian Cyrillic: Марко Аврамовић; born 2 April 1987) is a Serbian former professional footballer who played as a midfielder.

== Honours ==
Mladost Lučani

- Serbian First League: 2013–14
