= Željko Milošević =

Serbian footballer and manager

Personal information
- Full name: Željko Milošević
- Date of birth: 25 January 1976 (age 50)
- Place of birth: Sremska Mitrovica, SFR Yugoslavia
- Height: 1.88 m (6 ft 2 in)
- Position: Defender

Team information
- Current team: Pobeda Beloševac

Senior career*
Years	Team	Apps	(Gls)
1997–1999	Srem	47	(1)
1999–2000	Obilić	0	(0)
2000–2006	Budućnost Banatski Dvor	155	(12)
2006–2008	Banat Zrenjanin	46	(3)
2008–2009	Laktaši	9	(0)
2009–2012	Radnički Kragujevac	84	(10)
Total		341	(26)

Managerial career
- 2013–2014: Pobeda Beloševac
- * Club domestic league appearances and goals

Željko Milošević (Serbian Cyrillic: Жељко Милошевић; born 25 January 1976) is a Serbian football manager and former player.

== Honours ==
Budućnost Banatski Dvor

- Serbia and Montenegro Cup: Runner-up 2003–04
