= Darko Bjelanović =

Serbian footballer

Personal information
- Date of birth: 25 July 1991 (age 35)
- Place of birth: Užice, SFR Yugoslavia
- Height: 1.85 m (6 ft 1 in)
- Position: Right-back

Senior career*
Years	Team	Apps	(Gls)
2009–2010	Zlatar Nova Varoš		
2011	→ Pobeda Beloševac (loan)		
2011–2013	Pobeda Beloševac	59	(1)
2014	Radnički Kragujevac	2	(0)
2014–2016	Pobeda Beloševac		
2016–2018	FAP		
- * Club domestic league appearances and goals as of 1 June 2014

Darko Bjelanović (Serbian Cyrillic: Дарко Бјелановић; born 25 July 1991) is a Serbian retired footballer who last played as a defender for FAP.

== Career ==
He has started in Zlatar Nova Varoš, then, he left to Pobeda Beloševac and after three seasons, he moved to Radnički Kragujevac.

=== Radnički Kragujevac ===
He made his debut for Radnički in Jelen SuperLiga away match versus Napredak Kruševac on 1 March 2014.
