= OFK Remont 1959 =

Serbian football club

Remont Čačak
- Full name: Omladinski Fudbalski Klub Remont 1959
- Nickname: Tobdžije (The Artillerymen)
- Founded: 1959; 67 years ago 2020; 6 years ago (refounded)
- Ground: Stadion FK Remont, Čačak
- President: Vladimir Grujović
- Head coach: Vladimir Vesković
- League: Čačak City League
- 2024–25: Čačak City League, 12th of 14

OFK Remont 1959 (Serbian Cyrillic: ОФК Ремонт 1959) is a football club based in Čačak, Serbia. They compete in the Čačak City League, the sixth tier of the national league system.

== History ==
FK Remont Čačak was founded on 21 May 1959. They participated in the Second League of Serbia and Montenegro between 2001 and 2003. In 2006, the club was relegated from the Serbian League West for the second time in three seasons.

In 2020, the club was refounded as OFK Remont 1959.

=== Recent league history ===
Season	Division	P	W	D	L	F	A	Pts	Pos
2020–21	6 - Čačak City League	22	3	3	16	38	74	12	11th
2021–22	6 - Čačak City League	24	16	1	7	78	35	49	3rd
2022–23	6 - Čačak City League	18	12	4	2	45	14	40	2nd
2023–24	6 - Čačak City League	22	9	2	11	63	76	29	6th
2024–25	6 - Čačak City League	26	8	1	17	45	75	25	12th

== Honours ==
Moravica Zone League (Tier 4)

- 2004–05

== Notable players ==
This is a list of players who have played at full international level.

- (Bosnia and Herzegovina) Đorđe Kamber
- (Serbia and Montenegro) Miloš Marić

For a list of all FK Remont Čačak players with a Wikipedia article, see Category:FK Remont Čačak players.
