= 2014–15 Serbian SuperLiga =

9th season of Serbian SuperLiga

Jelen SuperLiga
- Season: 2014–15
- Champions: Partizan; 7th SuperLiga Title; 26th domestic title
- Champions League: Partizan
- Europa League: Red Star; Čukarički; Vojvodina
- Matches: 240
- Goals: 557 (2.32 per match)
- Top goalscorer: Patrick Friday Eze (15 goals)
- Best goalkeeper: Predrag Rajković (8 clean sheets)
- Biggest home win: Čukarički 7–0 Rad
- Biggest away win: Voždovac 1–6 Rad
- Highest scoring: Čukarički 7–0 Rad; Vojvodina 5–2 Spartak S.; Voždovac 1–6 Rad
- Highest attendance: 44,120; Red Star 0–0 Partizan
- Lowest attendance: 150; Rad 0–0 Vojvodina

The 2014–15 Serbian SuperLiga (known as the Jelen SuperLiga for sponsorship reasons) was the ninth season of the Serbian SuperLiga, the top football league of Serbia.

== Teams ==
The league contains 16 teams. 14 teams from the 2013–14 Serbian SuperLiga and two new teams Borac Čačak and Mladost Lučani.

=== Stadiums and locations ===
Location of teams in 2014–15 Serbian SuperLiga

Club	City	Stadium	Capacity
Borac Čačak	Čačak	Čačak Stadium	8,000
Čukarički	Belgrade	Stadion Čukarički	4,070
Donji Srem	Pećinci	SC Suvača	4,000
Jagodina	Jagodina	City Stadium	15,000
Mladost Lučani	Lučani	Stadion Mladost	8,000
Napredak Kruševac	Kruševac	Mladost	10,331
Novi Pazar	Novi Pazar	City Stadium	12,000
OFK Beograd	Belgrade	Omladinski Stadium	19,100
Partizan	Belgrade	Partizan Stadium	32,710
Rad	Belgrade	King Peter I	6,000
Radnički 1923	Kragujevac	Čika Dača	15,100
Radnički	Niš	Čair	18,151
Red Star	Belgrade	Red Star Stadium	55,538
Spartak Subotica	Subotica	City Stadium	13,000
Vojvodina	Novi Sad	Karađorđe	14,458
Voždovac	Belgrade	Shopping Center Stadium	5,200

=== Personnel and kits ===
Note: Flags indicate national team as has been defined under FIFA eligibility rules. Players and Managers may hold more than one non-FIFA nationality.

Team	Head coach	Captain	Kit manufacturer	shirt sponsor
Borac	(Serbia) Bogić Bogićević	(Serbia) Mario Maslać	NAAI	Škoda Auto
Donji Srem	(Serbia) Zoran Govedarica	(Serbia) Marko Prljević	NAAI	Kutpoint
Čukarički	(Serbia) Vladan Milojević	(Serbia) Igor Matić	adidas	ADOC
Jagodina	(Bosnia and Herzegovina) Simo Krunić	(Serbia) Danijel Mihajlović	Legea	—
Mladost Lučani	(Serbia) Nenad Milovanović	(Serbia) Nemanja Krznarić	Givova	—
Napredak	(Serbia) Slavko Matić	(Serbia) Marko Paunović	Hummel	—
Novi Pazar	(Serbia) Milorad Kosanović	(Serbia) Bojan Đorđević	Joma	Dragolovcanin
OFK Beograd	(Serbia) Dejan Đurđević	(Serbia) Bogdan Planić	Joma	DDOR
Partizan	(Serbia) Zoran Milinković	(Serbia) Saša Ilić	adidas	—
Rad	(Serbia) Milan Milanović	(Serbia) Branislav Milošević	NAAI	Rubikon
Radnički 1923	(Serbia) Neško Milovanović	(Serbia) Žarko Trifunović	Jako	—
Radnički	(Serbia) Milan Rastavac	(Serbia) Aleksandar Jovanović	NAAI	—
Red Star	(Serbia) Nenad Lalatović	(Serbia) Aleksandar Luković	Puma	Gazprom
Spartak	(Serbia) Stevan Mojsilović	(Serbia) Vladimir Torbica	Jako	Zlatibor Voda
Vojvodina	(Bulgaria) Zlatomir Zagorčić	(Serbia) Mijat Gaćinović	Joma	Volkswagen
Voždovac	(Serbia) Bratislav Živković	(Serbia) Miloš Pavlović	Diadora	—

Nike is the official ball supplier for Serbian SuperLiga.

== Transfers ==
For the list of transfers involving SuperLiga clubs during 2014–15 season, please see: List of Serbian football transfers summer 2014 and List of Serbian football transfers winter 2014-15.

== League table ==
Pos	Team	Pld	W	D	L	GF	GA	GD	Pts	Qualification or relegation
1	Partizan (C)	30	21	8	1	67	22	+45	71	Qualification for Champions League second qualifying round
2	Red Star Belgrade	30	19	7	4	46	20	+26	64	Qualification for Europa League first qualifying round (Note: Since Čukarički and Partizan got to the 2014–15 Serbian Cup final, the fourth placed team to have qualified for the first qualifying round of the 2015–16 UEFA Europa League)
3	Čukarički	30	16	9	5	48	24	+24	57	Qualification for Europa League first qualifying round
4	Vojvodina	30	16	4	10	44	36	+8	52	Qualification for Europa League first qualifying round
5	Novi Pazar	30	13	8	9	39	28	+11	47	
6	Rad	30	13	4	13	33	38	−5	43	
7	Mladost Lučani	30	11	7	12	41	47	−6	40	
8	OFK Beograd	30	10	9	11	35	43	−8	39	
9	Radnički	30	9	10	11	25	31	−6	37	
10	Jagodina	30	10	5	15	38	45	−7	35	
11	Spartak Subotica	30	9	7	14	23	33	−10	34	
12	Voždovac	30	9	7	14	24	37	−13	34	
13	Borac Čačak	30	8	9	13	29	35	−6	33	
14	Napredak Kruševac (R)	30	8	7	15	23	34	−11	31	Qualification for play-off
15	Donji Srem (R)	30	6	8	16	25	42	−17	26	Relegation to Serbian First League
16	Radnički 1923 (R)	30	4	7	19	17	42	−25	19	Relegation to Serbian First League

Source: Serbian SuperLiga
Rules for classification: 1) points; 2) head-to-head points; 3) head-to-head goal difference; 4) head-to-head goals scored; 5) goal difference; 6) number of goals scored.
(C) Champions; (R) Relegated

== Results ==
All clubs play each other twice, once at home and once away. Giving a total of 30 matches to be played per team.

Home \ Away	BOR	ČUK	DSR	JAG	MLA	NAP	NPZ	OFK	PAR	RAD	RKR	RNI	RSB	SPA	VOJ	VŽD
Borac Čačak		0–0	2–0	3–1	0–1	0–1	1–0	1–1	3–3	0–1	2–0	0–0	0–1	1–0	1–1	0–0
Čukarički	1–1		1–1	0–3	1–0	1–0	1–1	1–0	2–2	7–0	4–1	1–1	2–0	2–0	0–1	2–0
Donji Srem	0–1	1–2		2–3	1–2	1–2	0–0	4–0	1–2	1–1	1–0	0–0	1–3	1–1	1–2	1–0
Jagodina	2–0	0–1	0–0		1–1	1–1	1–3	5–3	1–0	0–2	2–1	3–1	2–3	1–3	2–3	1–2
Mladost Lučani	2–1	2–2	0–0	2–3		2–1	1–3	4–2	1–2	2–1	0–0	1–0	1–1	3–2	1–2	3–2
Napredak Kruševac	2–1	0–2	3–1	0–1	1–1		0–1	2–4	0–2	2–3	1–0	3–1	0–0	0–0	0–1	0–2
Novi Pazar	2–2	1–2	2–0	3–0	1–2	1–1		3–1	1–1	1–0	2–0	3–1	2–1	1–0	0–1	1–0
OFK Beograd	1–0	0–4	4–0	1–1	2–1	1–0	3–2		1–3	1–0	2–0	0–0	2–4	0–0	0–0	1–0
Partizan	5–1	4–2	3–0	1–0	3–0	3–1	1–1	1–1		2–0	2–1	0–0	1–0	1–0	1–0	3–3
Rad	2–1	1–3	2–0	1–0	3–1	0–1	1–0	1–1	0–4		1–0	1–0	1–2	0–1	0–0	2–0
Radnički 1923	0–1	0–1	0–0	0–0	2–3	0–0	1–1	0–0	0–3	0–3		1–2	0–0	1–0	3–4	2–1
Radnički	1–0	2–1	0–1	1–0	2–2	2–0	3–1	0–0	1–4	3–0	1–0		0–0	1–0	1–1	0–0
Red Star Belgrade	3–1	0–0	1–0	3–0	3–1	1–0	2–0	2–1	0–0	2–0	1–2	2–0		1–0	3–0	2–2
Spartak Subotica	2–2	1–0	3–2	2–0	1–0	0–0	0–2	1–0	0–3	0–0	1–0	1–0	1–3		0–1	0–1
Vojvodina	1–3	1–2	2–3	1–4	2–1	0–1	1–0	3–0	0–4	2–0	3–1	3–0	0–1	5–2		3–0
Voždovac	1–0	0–0	0–1	1–0	2–0	1–0	0–0	0–2	1–3	1–6	0–1	2–1	0–1	1–1	1–0	

Source: Serbian SuperLiga
Legend: Blue = home team win; Yellow = draw; Red = away team win.

== Play-off ==
Team 1	Agg.	Team 2	1st leg	2nd leg
Metalac Gornji Milanovac	4–2	Napredak Kruševac	3–1	1–1

== Top goalscorers ==
Pos	Scorer	Team	Goals
1	(Nigeria) Patrick Friday Eze	Mladost	15
2	(Serbia) Petar Škuletić	Partizan	14
3	(Serbia) Mijat Gaćinović	Vojvodina	11
4	(Serbia) Igor Matić	Čukarički	10
4	(Serbia) Darko Lazović	Red Star	10
4	(Serbia) Mirko Ivanić	Vojvodina	10
7	(Serbia) Danko Lazović	Partizan	9
7	(Serbia) Nikola Stojiljković	Čukarički	9
9	(Bosnia and Herzegovina) Petar Jelić	Rad	8
9	(Serbia) Ivica Jovanović	OFK	8
9	(Serbia) Slavoljub Srnić	Čukarički	8
9	(Serbia) Lazar Veselinović	Vojvodina	8

== Hat-tricks ==
Player	For	Against	Result	Date
(Bosnia and Herzegovina) Petar Jelić^{5}	Rad	Vozdovac	6–1	23 August 2014
(Serbia) Petar Škuletić	Partizan	Spartak	3–0	9 November 2014
(Nigeria) Patrick Friday Eze	Mladost Lučani	Spartak	3–2	7 March 2015

^{5} Player scored five goals

== Awards ==
=== Team of the Season ===

Serbian SuperLiga Team of the Year

Position	Player	Team
GK	(Serbia) Predrag Rajković	Red Star
DR	(Serbia) Filip Stojković	Čukarički
DC	(Serbia) Zoran Rendulić	Čukarički
DC	(Montenegro) Savo Pavićević	Red Star
DL	(Serbia) Rajko Brežančić	Čukarički
MR	(Serbia) Stefan Babović	Partizan
AM	(Serbia) Igor Matić	Čukarički
MC	(Montenegro) Nikola Drinčić	Partizan
ML	(Serbia) Mijat Gaćinović	Vojvodina
FW	(Nigeria) Patrick Friday Eze	Mladost Lučani
FW	(Serbia) Nikola Stojiljković	Čukarički
