= FK Donji Srem 2015 =

Football club in Serbia

Donji Srem
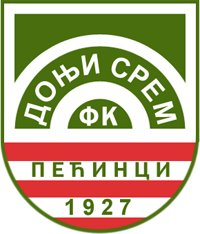
- Full name: Fudbalski Klub Donji Srem 2015
- Founded: 1927; 99 years ago
- Ground: Suvača Sportcenter, Pećinci
- Capacity: 2,164
- Chairman: Milan Aleksić
- Manager: Nebojša Jovanović
- League: Vojvodina League South
- 2024-25: Vojvodina League South, 8th
Home colours	Away colours

Fudbаlski klub Donji Srem 2015 (Serbian Cyrillic: Фудбалски клуб Доњи Срем 2015), commonly known simply as Donji Srem, is a football club based in Pećinci, Serbia.

== History ==
The club was initially established under the name Borac Pećinci in 1927. With time, the location of Pećinci begins to have more and more features of an urban area contributing mostly for this the proximity to the important Belgrade-Zagreb highway by which the Serbian, and former Yugoslav, capital city of Belgrade is just 41 kilometers away. Other important factors for the town development were the progress of economy, culture, sports and education in the region.

With the promotion of the town of Pećinci into center of the municipality much human and material support were attributed into disposition for the progress and development of football, with the club of FK Donji Srem its primary exponent, culminating with the promotion to the Serbian League Vojvodina in 2009. The most important contributors for this success were the main financial supporters of the club, Milenko Đurđević and Milan Aleksić.

In the season 2010–11, Donji Srem won the Serbian League Vojvodina, achieving promotion to the national second tier, the Serbian First League. In 2011–12, they beat all the odds and rolled to finish as runners-up in the Serbian First League, earning a historical first time promotion to top tier Serbian SuperLiga for 2012–13.

In the SuperLiga, they famously upset FK Partizan 2–1 in the second round of the 2012–13 season. Donji Srem spent three years in the SuperLiga. They finally suffered relegation in 2014–15 after a number of controversial results went against them, including losing 3–2 away to Spartak Subotica where Spartak were awarded two late penalties.

While in the SuperLiga, the team occasionally played some matches at the Karađorđe Stadium in Novi Sad.

In 2017, the club was renamed to FK Donji Srem 2015. and currently plays in the 4th-tier Vojvodina League South.

=== Recent league history ===
Season	Division	P	W	D	L	F	A	Pts	Pos
2020–21	5 - PFL Sremska Mitrovica	34	23	5	6	78	26	74	2nd
2021–22	4 - Vojvodina League South	30	15	5	10	45	33	50	3rd
2022–23	4 - Vojvodina League South	30	11	4	15	38	42	37	10th
2023–24	4 - Vojvodina League South	30	13	6	11	48	42	45	5th
2024–25	4 - Vojvodina League South	30	10	7	13	33	30	37	8th

== Stadium ==
Club's home ground is known as Suvača Sportcenter. This sport complex is currently under reconstruction. After renovation stadium will have 3,500 seats. In the 2012–13 season, Donji Srem played their home games in Novi Sad at Karađorđe Stadium.

== Honours and achievements ==
- Serbian League Vojvodina
  - Winners (1): 2011
- Serbian First League
  - Runners-up (1): 2011–12

== Club management ==
Position	Name
Club president	Milan Aleksić
Sports director	Dragan Despotović
General secretary	Milica Smiljanić
Manager	Srba Čojčić

== Former players ==
The former players have made appearances for A national teams:

- (Bosnia and Herzegovina) Rade Krunić
- (Bosnia and Herzegovina) Almedin Ziljkić
- (Ghana) Abubakar Moro
- (Liberia) Omega Roberts
- (North Macedonia) Stefan Aškovski
- (Serbia) Miloš Bogunović
- (Serbia) Anđelko Đuričić

For the list of former and current players with Wikipedia article, please see: Category:FK Donji Srem players.

== Historical list of coaches ==
- (Serbia) Bogić Bogićević (July 1, 2011 – May 17, 2013)
- (Serbia) Vladimir Naić (May 19, 2013 – May 27, 2013)
- (Serbia) Ljubomir Ristovski (May 28, 2013 – Sept 1, 2013)
- (Bosnia and Herzegovina) Vlado Čapljić (Sept 2, 2013 – June 2, 2014)
- (Serbia) Nenad Vanić (June 5, 2014 – November 3, 2014)
- (Bulgaria) Zlatomir Zagorčić (October 19, 2014 – March 16, 2015)
- (Serbia) Nebojša Vučković (March 18, 2015 – April 8, 2015)
- (Serbia) Zoran Govedarica (April 14, 2015 – June 30, 2015)
- (Serbia) Dušan Kljajić (June 6, 2015 – June 30, 2016)
- (Serbia) Tomislav Ćirković (February 14, 2016 – June 16, 2017)
- (Serbia) Nebojša Jovanović (June 17, 2017 – present)

== Kit manufacturers and shirt sponsors ==
Period	Kit Manufacturer	Shirt Sponsor
2010–present	Joma	
