= 2013–14 Serbian Cup =

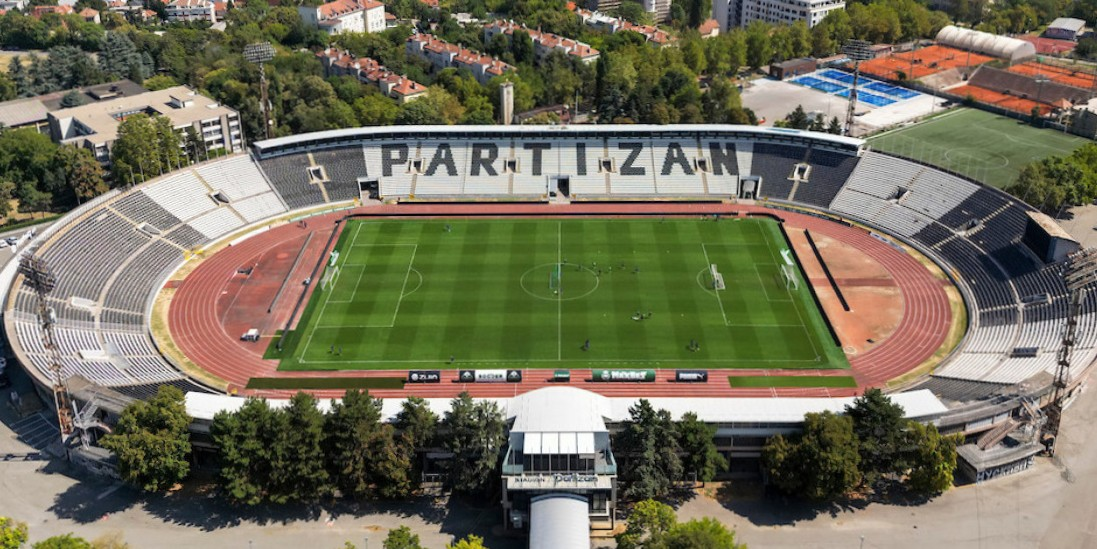
- Partizan Stadium hosted the final

Tournament details
- Country: Serbia

Final positions
- Champions: Vojvodina
- Runners-up: Jagodina

Tournament statistics
- Matches played: 39
- Goals scored: 83 (2.13 per match)
- Top goal scorer(s): Aleksandar Nosković (Spartak); Miloš Lepović (Jagodina); 5 goals

The 2013–14 Serbian Cup season is the eighth season of the Serbian national football tournament.

The competition will start on 4 September 2013 and concludes with the final on 7 May 2014.

Vojvodina, the winner of the competition, qualified for the 2014–15 UEFA Europa League.

== Calendar ==
Round	Date(s)	Number of fixtures	Clubs	New entries this round
Preliminary round	4 September 2013	7	46 → 32	none
Round of 32	25 September 2013	16	32 → 16	16
Round of 16	30 October 2013	8	16 → 8	none
Quarter-finals	4 December 2013	8	8 → 4	none
Semi-finals	26 March and 9 April 2014	4	4 → 2	none
Final	7 May 2014	2	2 → 1	none

== Preliminary round ==
A preliminary round was held in order to reduce the number of teams competing in the next round to 32. It consisted of 7 single-legged ties, with penalty shoot-out as decider, if the score was tied after 90 minutes. Appearing in this round were bottom 9 teams from 2012–13 Serbian First League, as well as 5 regional cup winners. The draw contained seeded and unseeded teams. Bottom 9 teams from 2012–13 Serbian First League (Sloga Kraljevo, Timok, Inđija, Teleoptik, Radnički Nova Pazova, Banat Zrenjanin, OFK Mladenovac, Kolubara and RFK Novi Sad) were set as seeded teams, with 5 regional cup winners (IM Rakovica, Partizan Bumbarevo Brdo, Trstenik PPT, Radnički Sremska Mitrovica and Mokra Gora) being set as unseeded teams. After drawing 5 seeded-unseeded match-ups, remaining 2 fixtures were determined by regular draw, without seeds. The matches were played on 4 September 2013. Average attendance for preliminary round matches was 490.

4 September 2013	IM Rakovica (III)	0–0 (5–4 p)	Radnički Nova Pazova (III)	Stadion IM Rakovica, Belgrade
16:00				Attendance: 300; Referee: Jovan Šegrt
	Penalties
	Milenković (penalty scored); Leković (penalty scored); Davidović (penalty scored); Džavrić (penalty scored); Mojsilović (penalty scored); Dabetić (penalty missed)		(penalty scored) Andrejić; (penalty scored) Berić; (penalty scored) Lazić; (penalty scored) Čeprnja; (penalty missed) Minić; (penalty missed) Cicović

4 September 2013	Partizan Bumbarevo Brdo (III)	3–1	Kolubara (III)	Gradski stadion, Bumbarevo Brdo
16:00	Čabak 66' (pen.); Đorđević 72'; Ljubisavljević 90+2'		44' Popović	Attendance: 200; Referee: Lazar Tripković

4 September 2013	Trstenik PPT (III)	1–0	Timok (II)	Gradski stadion, Trstenik
16:00	Milanović 29'			Attendance: 1,000; Referee: Jovan Grujić

4 September 2013	Radnički Sremska Mitrovica (III)	1–1 (3–2 p)	Inđija (II)	Stadion FK Radnički, Sremska Mitrovica
16:00	65' Skorupan		Tomanović 65'	Attendance: 600; Referee: Branko Labus
	Penalties
	Sovilj (penalty missed); Ristić (penalty scored); Skorupan (penalty scored); Trebovac (penalty scored)		(penalty scored) Tomanović; (penalty missed) Pejić; (penalty missed) Stanković; (penalty scored) Erić; (penalty missed) Bajić

4 September 2013	Mokra Gora (IV)	1–2	Sloga Kraljevo (II)	Stadion Mala Marakana, Zubin Potok
16:00	Đorđević 47'		30' (pen.) Janićijević; 74' Stanković	Attendance: 1,000; Referee: Dragan Čolović

4 September 2013	RFK Novi Sad (III)	0–0 (4 – 5 p)	Banat Zrenjanin (III)	Stadion Detelinara, Novi Sad
16:00				Attendance: 250; Referee: Đorđe Maksimović
	Penalties
	Vukosavljev (penalty scored); Veličković (penalty scored); Pjević (penalty scored); Kaurin (penalty scored); Vujošević (penalty missed)		(penalty scored) Višković; (penalty scored) Jovandić; (penalty scored) Krstinić; (penalty scored) Galić; (penalty scored) D. Bogunović

4 September 2013	OFK Mladenovac (III)	0–1	Teleoptik (II)	Stadion Selters, Mladenovac
16:00			58' Georgijević	Attendance: 100; Referee: Dejan Trifković

== Round of 32 ==
In this round, seven winners from the previous round were joined by all 16 teams from Serbian Superliga from 2012–13, as well as top 9 teams from Serbian First League from 2012–13. The draw contained seeded and unseeded teams. Hajduk Kula, which finished 8th in Serbian Superliga previous season was dissolved after propositions for this season's cup competition were established. Thus only 15 teams from 2012–13 Serbian SuperLiga (Partizan, Crvena zvezda, Vojvodina, Jagodina, Sloboda Užice, OFK Beograd, Rad, Spartak Subotica, Javor Ivanica, Donji Srem, Radnički Niš, Radnički 1923, Novi Pazar, BSK Borča (II), Smederevo (II)) were set as seeded teams. After 15 drawn ties, remaining undrawn unseeded team was Voždovac, and it received an automatic bye to the next round. Draw was held on 12 September 2013. The matches were played on 25 September 2013. No extra time was played if the score was tied after regular 90 minutes, with games going straight into penalties. Average attendance for first round matches was 1400.

25 September 2013	Proleter Novi Sad (II)	0–3	Crvena zvezda	Stadion Karađorđe, Novi Sad
15:00			Pečnik 44'; Dauda 60', 84'	Attendance: 4,500; Referee: Danilo Grujić

25 September 2013	Borac Čačak (II)	2–1	Rad	Stadion Čačak, Čačak
16:00	Nikolić 71'; Maslać 81'		38' Pavlović	Attendance: 1,000; Referee: Srđan Obradović

25 September 2013	Trstenik PPT (III)	0–2	Novi Pazar	Gradski stadion, Trstenik
16:00			63' Arsenijević; 84' Jelić	Attendance: 3,000; Referee: Novak Simović

25 September 2013	Radnički 1923	1–0	Banat Zrenjanin (III)	Stadion Čika Dača, Kragujevac
16:00	Spalević 35'			Attendance: 500; Referee: Dejan Filipović

25 September 2013	Partizan Bumbarevo Brdo (III)	0–3	Spartak Subotica	Gradski stadion, Bumbarevo Brdo
16:00			2', 83' Nosković; 90' Torbica	Attendance: 700; Referee: Milan Ilić

25 September 2013	Radnički Sremska Mitrovica (III)	0–2	Donji Srem	Stadion FK Radnički, Sremska Mitrovica
16:00			5' Damnjanović; 27' Lukić	Attendance: 1,000; Referee: Miodrag Gogić

25 September 2013	Teleoptik (II)	0–3	Sloboda Užice	SC Partizan-Teleoptik, Zemun
16:00			18', 45+2', 67' Thiago Galvão	Attendance: 150; Referee: Dejan Santrač

25 September 2013	Sloga Kraljevo (II)	1–1 (2–3 p)	Vojvodina	Gradski stadion, Kraljevo
16:00	Gobeljić 66'		10' Kaluđerović	Attendance: 3,000; Referee: Ninoslav Spasić
	Penalties
	Gobeljić (penalty scored); Vulić (penalty missed); Miletić (penalty scored); Marušić (penalty missed); Stanković (penalty missed)		(penalty scored) Kosović; (penalty scored) Vranješ; (penalty missed) Tumbasević; (penalty scored) Škuletić

25 September 2013	Mladost Lučani (II)	0–0 (3–4 p)	OFK Beograd	Stadion Mladost, Lučani
16:00				Attendance: 500; Referee: Nenad Kurčubić
	Penalties
	Živadinović (penalty scored); N. Stojanović (penalty missed); Gavrić (penalty scored); Milunović (penalty scored); Petrović (penalty missed)		(penalty scored) Damjanović; (penalty missed) Gajić; (penalty scored) Čavrić; (penalty scored) Zdjelar; (penalty scored) Vasiljević

25 September 2013	IM Rakovica (III)	1–4	Jagodina	Stadion IM Rakovica, Belgrade
16:00	Paunović 57'		42' Šušnjar; 49', 82' Lepović; 75' Mitošević	Attendance: 1,000; Referee: Majo Vujović

25 September 2013	Smederevo (II)	0–1	Čukarički	Gradski stadion, Smederevo
16:00			37' Sekulić	Attendance: 400; Referee: Aleksandar Vasić

25 September 2013	BSK Borča (II)	0–1	Jedinstvo Užice (II)	Vizelj Park, Belgrade
16:00			87' Paunović	Attendance: 400; Referee: Danilo Mihajlović

25 September 2013	Bežanija (II)	0–2	Radnički Niš	Stadion Bežanije, Belgrade
16:00			46', 70' Hadžibulić	Attendance: 500; Referee: Slobodan Veselinović

25 September 2013	Partizan	2–0	Metalac (II)	Stadion FK Partizan, Belgrade
17:00	Fofana 34'; Petrović 70'			Attendance: 2,000; Referee: Novica Anđelovski

25 September 2013	Napredak Kruševac	2–1	Javor	Stadion Mladost, Kruševac
19:00	Bojić 15'; Mirosavljević 90+3'		90+1' Sotirović	Attendance: 2,358; Referee: Vlado Glođović

== Round of 16 ==
16 winners from first round took part in this stage of the competition. The draw was scheduled for 8 October 2013, and it contained seeded and unseeded teams. Seedings were determined by last season's final standings in top two Serbian divisions. Seeded teams: Partizan, Crvena Zvezda, Vojvodina, Jagodina, Sloboda Užice, OFK Beograd, Spartak Subotica and Donji Srem. Unseeded teams: Radnički Niš, Radnički 1923, Novi Pazar, Napredak Kruševac, Čukarički, Voždovac, Jedinstvo Užice (II) and Borac Čačak (II). The matches were played on 30 October 2013. No extra time was played in case of tie after 90 minutes. Those games went straight into penalty shoot-out. Average attendance for second round matches was 2720.

30 October 2013	Spartak Subotica	2–0	Napredak Kruševac	Gradski Stadion, Subotica
14:00	Nosković 73', 90+2'			Attendance: 500; Referee: Darko Bogdanović

30 October 2013	OFK Beograd	2–1	Jedinstvo Užice (II)	Omladinski Stadium, Belgrade
14:00	Paločević 47', 90+4'		Milekić 19'	Attendance: 400; Referee: Majo Vujović

30 October 2013	Donji Srem	2–0	Borac Čačak (II)	SC Suvača, Pećinci
14:00	Marčeta 18'; Čordašić 89' (pen.)			Attendance: 200; Referee: Milenko Vukadinović

30 October 2013	Vojvodina	0–0 (3–0 p)	Novi Pazar	Stadion Karađorđe, Novi Sad
16:00				Attendance: 1,000; Referee: Milan Jeremić
	Penalties
	Vranješ (penalty scored); Škuletić (penalty scored); Radoja (penalty scored)		(penalty missed) Arsenijević; (penalty missed) Mutavdžić; (penalty missed) Rusmir

30 October 2013	Radnički Niš	0–3	Partizan	Stadion Čair, Niš
17:00			Luka 8'; Ninković 49', 73'	Attendance: 13,000; Referee: Boško Jovanetić

30 October 2013	Sloboda Užice	2–0	Voždovac	Gradski Stadion, Užice
18:00	Žeravica 71'; Pejović 77'			Attendance: 1,500; Referee: Dejan Santrač

30 October 2013	Čukarički	0–2	Jagodina	Stadion Čukarički, Belgrade
18:00			Lepović 21'; Arsenijević 27'	Attendance: 500; Referee: Vlado Glođović

30 October 2013	Crvena zvezda	3–0	Radnički 1923	Stadion Crvene Zvezde, Belgrade
19:00	Milijaš 9' (pen.); Mijailović 55'; Krneta 89'			Attendance: 4,661; Referee: Ninoslav Spasić

== Quarter-finals ==
8 winners from second round take part in this stage of the competition. The draw was held on 11 November 2013, and contained seeded and unseeded teams. Seedings were determined by following key: Last season's cup semifinalists were automatically set as seeded teams, with remaining seeds determined by last season final standings in top two Serbian divisions. Seeded teams: Jagodina, Vojvodina, OFK Beograd, Partizan. Unseeded teams: Crvena Zvezda, Sloboda Užice, Spartak Subotica, Donji Srem. The matches were played on 4 December 2013.

4 December 2013	Spartak Subotica	2–0	Partizan	Gradski Stadion, Subotica
13:00	Šarac 11'; Nosković 15'			Attendance: 2,000; Referee: Danilo Grujić

4 December 2013	Sloboda Užice	0–2	OFK Beograd	Gradski Stadion, Užice
13:00			Ješić 27'; Čavrić 83'	Attendance: 700; Referee: Vlado Glođović

4 December 2013	Jagodina	4–1	Donji Srem	Gradski Stadion, Jagodina
16:00	Lepović 11'; Pešić 13', 31', 33'		Čordašić 70' (pen.)	Attendance: 1,000; Referee: Milenko Vukadinović

4 December 2013	Crvena zvezda	1–3	Vojvodina	Stadion Crvene Zvezde, Belgrade
17:00	Mrđa 73'		Kaluđerović 11'; Alivodić 58'; Škuletić 71'	Attendance: 7,120; Referee: Boško Jovanetić

== Semi-finals ==
4 winners from Quarter finals (Jagodina, Vojvodina, OFK Beograd and Spartak Subotica) take part in this stage of the competition. The draw was held on 17 December 2013. There were no seedings in the draw. Semi-finals were contested over two legs. Aggregate winners qualified for the Cup finals. First legs were played on 26 March 2014, and second legs were played on 9 April 2014.

Team 1	Agg.	Team 2	1st leg	2nd leg
Vojvodina	2−0	Spartak Subotica	1–0	1−0
OFK Beograd	1–4	Jagodina	1–2	0–2

=== First legs ===
26 March 2014 SF	OFK Beograd	1–2	Jagodina	Omladinski Stadium, Belgrade
15:00	Gajić 17'		Lepović 3'; Arsenijević 61'	Attendance: 3,000; Referee: Novica Anđelovski

26 March 2014 SF	Vojvodina	1–0	Spartak Subotica	Stadion Karađorđe, Novi Sad
18:00	Gaćinović 59'			Attendance: 3,000; Referee: Dejan Santrač

=== Second legs ===
9 April 2014 SF	Spartak Subotica	0–1 (0–2 agg.)	Vojvodina	Gradski Stadion, Subotica
15:00			Milinković-Savić 76'	Referee: Boško Jovanetić

9 April 2014 SF	Jagodina	2–0 (4–1 agg.)	OFK Beograd	Gradski Stadion, Jagodina
18:00	M. Đurić 37'; Pešić 54'			Referee: Bojan Nikolić

== Final ==
2 winners from Semi-finals took part in the single-legged final. The final game was played on 7 May 2014.

7 May 2014	Vojvodina	2–0	Jagodina	Partizan Stadium, Belgrade
20:00	Alivodić 41'; Babić 52'			Referee: Boško Jovanetić
