= 2012–13 Serbian Cup =

2012-13 Serbian Cup
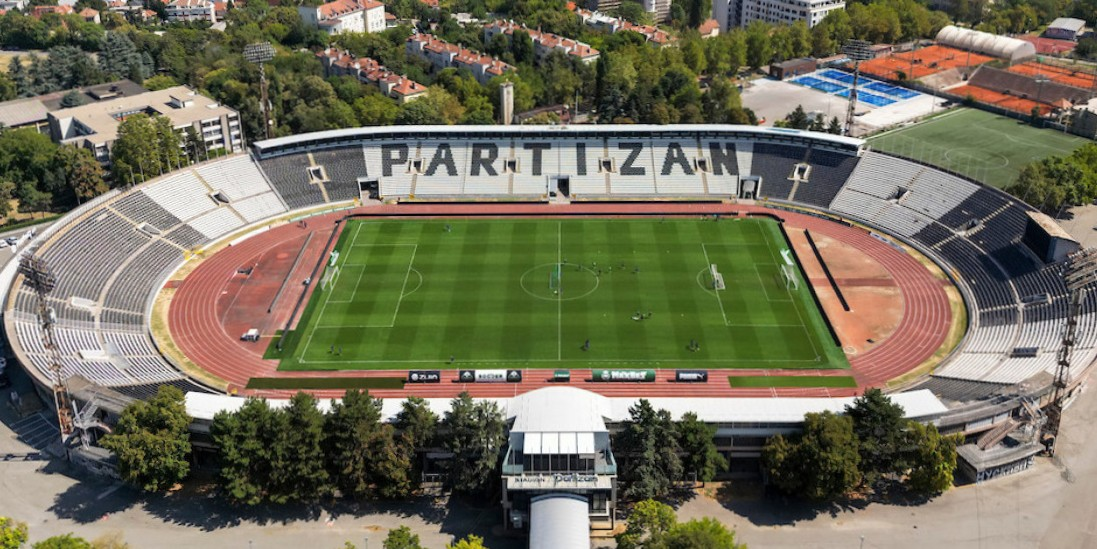
- Partizan Stadium hosted the final

Tournament details
- Country: Serbia

Final positions
- Champions: Jagodina
- Runners-up: Vojvodina

Tournament statistics
- Matches played: 39
- Goals scored: 84 (2.15 per match)
- Top goal scorer(s): Abubakar Oumarou (Vojvodina); 3 goals

The 2012–13 Serbian Cup season is the seventh season of the Serbian national football tournament.

The competition started on 5 September 2012 and concluded with the final on 8 May 2013.

The winner of the competition qualified for the 2013–14 UEFA Europa League.

== Preliminary round ==
A preliminary round was held in order to reduce the number of teams competing in the next round to 32. It consisted of 7 single-legged ties, with penalty shoot-out as decider, if the score was tied after 90 minutes. Appearing in this round were bottom 9 teams from 2011–12 Serbian First League, as well as 5 regional cup winners. The draw contained seeded and unseeded teams. Bottom 9 teams from 2011–12 Serbian First League (RFK Novi Sad, OFK Mladenovac, Kolubara, Čukarički, Banat, Radnički Sombor, Mladi Radnik, Sinđelić Niš and Srem) were set as seeded teams, with 5 regional cup winners (Dunav, Kovačevac, Timok, Jedinstvo Užice and Trepča) being set as unseeded teams. After drawing 5 seeded-unseeded match-ups, remaining 2 fixtures were determined by regular draw, without seeds. The matches were played on 5 and 12 September 2012.

5 September 2012	Čukarički (II)	2–1	Srem (III)	Stadion Čukarički, Belgrade
16:00	6' Dinčić; 34' Dmitrović		Stevanović 75'	Attendance: 200; Referee: Goran Milovanović

5 September 2012	Radnički Sombor (III)	0–3	RFK Novi Sad (II)	Gradski Stadion, Sombor
16:00			Božičić 72'; Maksimović 79' (pen.); Božičić 90'	Attendance: 100; Referee: Nemanja Petković

5 September 2012	Dunav (III)	3–1	Banat (II)	Stadion Pod bairom, Stari Banovci
16:00	13' Kokir; 55' Haska; 69' Đemaj		Delibašić 77' (pen.)	Attendance: 1,000; Referee: Nemanja Gajdobranski

5 September 2012	Kovačevac (III)	1–0	Mladi Radnik (III)	Stadion Mladost Kovačevac, Mladenovac
16:00	80' (pen.) Mijailović

5 September 2012	Jedinstvo Užice (II)	0–1	Kolubara (II)	Stadion Krčagovo, Užice
16:00			Stanković 90+3'	Attendance: 500; Referee: Zoran Široki

5 September 2012	Timok (II)	2–1	Sinđelić Niš (III)	Zaječar City Stadium, Zaječar
16:00

12 September 2012	Trepča (IV)	0–0 (1–4 p)	OFK Mladenovac (II)	Stadion u Žitkovcu, Zvečan
16:00

== Round of 32 ==
In this round, seven winners from the previous round will be joined by all 16 teams from Serbian Superliga from 2011 to 2012, as well as top 9 teams from Serbian First League from 2011 to 2012. The draw contained seeded and unseeded teams. 16 teams from 2011–12 Serbian SuperLiga (Partizan, Red Star, Vojvodina, Jagodina, Sloboda Užice, Radnički 1923, Spartak Subotica, OFK Beograd, Javor, Rad, Hajduk Kula, BSK Borča, Smederevo, Novi Pazar, Borac Čačak (II) and Metalac (II)) were set as seeded teams. Draw was held on 13 September 2012. The matches were played on 26 September 2012. No extra time was played if the score was tied after regular 90 minutes, with games going straight into penalties.

26 September 2012	Kovačevac (III)	2–4	Hajduk Kula	Stadion Mladost Kovačevac, Mladenovac
14.00	75' Damnjanović; 77' Damnjanović		Ćovin 6'; Veselinović 24'; Adamović 30'; Popović 90+4'	Attendance: 1,000; Referee: Milan Ilić

26 September 2012	OFK Beograd	5–0	Sloga Kraljevo (II)	Omladinski Stadium, Belgrade
16.00	17' Jovanović; 43' Rodić; 60' (pen.) Trivunović; 66' Čavrić; 83' Milić			Attendance: 250; Referee: Miodrag Gogić

26 September 2012	Sloboda Užice	0–1	Inđija (II)	Gradski Stadion na Begluku, Užice
16.00			Dimitrov 12' (pen.)	Attendance: 1,000; Referee: Ninoslav Spasić

26 September 2012	Borac Čačak (II)	0–0 (5–4 p)	Kolubara (II)	Čačak Stadium, Čačak
16.00				Attendance: 500; Referee: Novica Anđelovski
	Penalties
	Rašković (penalty scored); Zoćević (penalty scored); Maslać (penalty scored); Nikodijević (penalty scored); Jovančić (penalty scored)		(penalty missed) Jovanović; (penalty scored) Milunović; (penalty scored) Marinković; (penalty scored) Filipović; (penalty scored) Luković

26 September 2012	OFK Mladenovac (II)	0–1	Spartak Subotica	Stadion Selters, Mladenovac
16.00			Despotović 83'	Attendance: 1,000; Referee: Nenad Đokić

26 September 2012	Teleoptik (II)	0–0 (7–8 p)	Javor	SC Partizan-Teleoptik, Zemun
16.00				Attendance: 400; Referee: Srđan Obradović
	Penalties
	Zonjić (penalty scored); Šaka (penalty scored); Ivković (penalty scored); Ljujić (penalty scored); Janković (penalty scored); Đulić (penalty scored); Petrović (penalty scored); M. Živković (penalty missed)		(penalty scored) Jakimovski; (penalty scored) Vlašić; (penalty scored) Eliomar; (penalty scored) Momčilović; (penalty scored) Radivojević; (penalty scored) Đokić; (penalty scored) Vidić; (penalty scored) Novaković

26 September 2012	Mladost Lučani (II)	2–2 (2–4 p)	Novi Pazar	Stadion Mladost, Lučani
16.00	22' (pen.) Milunović; 71' Milosavljević		Alivodić 36'; Stanić 76'	Attendance: 400; Referee: Petar Piper
	Penalties
	Milosavljević (penalty scored); Škrijelj (penalty scored); Ivković (penalty missed); Ljujić (penalty missed)		(penalty scored) Mujdragić; (penalty scored) Ristović; (penalty scored) Vušljanin; (penalty scored) Alivodić

26 September 2012	Radnički Niš	1–2	Red Star	Čair Stadium, Niš
16.00	Ranđelović 77'		Milunović 37'; Jovanović 89'	Attendance: 12,000; Referee: Vlado Glođović

26 September 2012	Vojvodina	1–0	Donji Srem	Karađorđe Stadium, Novi Sad
16.00	Bojović 59'			Attendance: 1,500; Referee: Dejan Santrač

26 September 2012	RFK Novi Sad (II)	1–0	Radnički 1923	Stadion Detelinara, Novi Sad
16.00	Stančetić 45'			Attendance: 400; Referee: Milan Karadžić

26 September 2012	Timok (II)	0–2	Rad	Zaječar City Stadium, Zaječar
16.00			Pršo 33'; Kojić 37'	Attendance: 5,000; Referee: Darko Bogdanović

26 September 2012	Bežanija (II)	0–2	Jagodina	Stadion Bežanije, Belgrade
16.00			Đurić 78' (pen.); S. Stojanović 81'	Attendance: 400; Referee: Slobodan Veselinović

26 September 2012	Dunav (III)	1–4	Metalac (II)	Stadion Pod bairom, Stari Banovci
16.00	J. Filipović 39'		Ivanović 25' (pen.); Ružičić 72'; Ćirković 85'; Janaćković 87'	Attendance: 1,000; Referee: Nemanja Petrović

26 September 2012	Čukarički (II)	1–0	BSK Borča	Stadion Čukarički, Belgrade
16.00	Matić 25' (pen.)			Attendance: 250; Referee: Dejan Filipović

26 September 2012	Smederevo	0–0 (5–4 p)	Napredak Kruševac (II)	Stadion FK Smederevo, Smederevo
16.00				Attendance: 500; Referee: Dragan Krstić
	Penalties
	Krmar (penalty scored); Tiodorović (penalty scored); Miljković (penalty scored); Momić (penalty scored); D. Živković (penalty scored)		(penalty scored) Gavrić; (penalty scored) Kostić; (penalty missed) Trujić; (penalty scored) Vignjević; (penalty scored) Petrović

26 September 2012	Partizan	4–1	Proleter Novi Sad (II)	Stadion FK Partizan, Belgrade
18.00	Mitrović 3'; Brašanac 6'; Aškovski 27'; Mitrović 38'		Obradović 60'	Attendance: 2,536; Referee: Dejan Dimitrijević

== Round of 16 ==
16 winners from first round took part in this stage of the competition. The draw was held on 4 October 2012 and contained seeded and unseeded teams. Seedings were determined by last seasons final standings in top two Serbian divisions. Seeded teams: Partizan, Red Star, Vojvodina, Jagodina, Spartak Subotica, OFK Beograd, Javor and Rad. Unseeded teams: Hajduk Kula, Smederevo, Novi Pazar, Borac Čačak (II), Metalac (II), Inđija (II), RFK Novi Sad (II) and Čukarički (II). The matches were scheduled for 24 and 31 October 2012. No extra time was played in case of tie after 90 minutes. Those games went straight into penalty shoot-out.

24 October 2012	Javor	3–0	Smederevo	Stadion kraj Moravice, Ivanjica
14:00	Radivojević 22', 62'; Milović 39'			Attendance: 300; Referee: Ninoslav Spasić

24 October 2012	Hajduk	0–2	Red Star	Stadion Hajduk, Kula
14:00			40' Mudrinski; 45+1' (pen.) Dimitrijević	Attendance: 2,000; Referee: Majo Vujović

24 October 2012	Spartak Subotica	0–0 (8–7 p)	Metalac (II)	Gradski Stadion, Subotica
14:00				Attendance: 500; Referee: Dragan Krstić
	Penalties
	Bratić (penalty scored); Puškarić (penalty scored); Šarac (penalty missed); Torbica (penalty scored); Đurđević (penalty scored); Novaković (penalty scored); Kovačević (penalty scored); G. Adamović (penalty scored); Milivojev (penalty scored)		(penalty scored) Luković; (penalty scored) Dopuđ; (penalty missed) Babić; (penalty scored) Živanović; (penalty scored) Radisavljević; (penalty scored) Mudreša; (penalty scored) Janačković; (penalty scored) Owusu; (penalty missed) Ružičić

24 October 2012	Inđija (II)	2–3	OFK Beograd	Stadion FK Inđija, Inđija
14:00	Dimitrov 21'; Dubajić 36'		12' Adžić; 52' Rodić; 68' Bogavac	Attendance: 600; Referee: Svetislav Marušić

24 October 2012	Novi Pazar	0–1	Rad	Gradski Stadion, Novi Pazar
14:00			39' Ljubinković	Attendance: 5,500; Referee: Novak Simović

24 October 2012	Jagodina	1–0	RFK Novi Sad (II)	Stadion FK Jagodina, Jagodina
14:00	El Monir 45+1'			Attendance: 1,000; Referee: Milan Jeremić

24 October 2012	Čukarički (II)	0–1	Vojvodina	Stadion Čukarički, Belgrade
14:00			52' Oumarou	Attendance: 300; Referee: Boško Jovanetić

31 October 2012	Partizan	1–2	Borac Čačak (II)	Stadion FK Partizan, Belgrade
16:00	Aškovski 31'		12' Maslać; 22' Jevtović	Attendance: 1,000; Referee: Novak Simović

== Quarter-finals ==
8 winners from Last 16 took part in this stage of the competition. The draw was held 2 November 2012 and contained seeded and unseeded teams. Seedings were determined by following key: Last season's cup semifinalists were automatically set as seeded teams, with remaining seeds determined by last season final standings in top two Serbian divisions. Seeded teams: Red Star, Borac Čačak (II), Vojvodina and Jagodina. Unseeded teams: Spartak Subotica, OFK Beograd, Javor, and Rad. The matches were played on 21 November 2012. No extra time was played in case of tie after 90 minutes. Those games went straight into penalty shoot-out.

21 November 2012	Rad	0–1	Jagodina	Stadion Kralj Petar I, Belgrade
13:00			62' Lepović	Attendance: 700; Referee: Miodrag Gogić

21 November 2012	Spartak Subotica	1–1 (3–5 p)	Vojvodina	Gradski Stadion, Subotica
13:00	Puškarić 31'		89' Oumarou	Attendance: 1,500; Referee: Milorad Mažić
	Penalties
	Torbica (penalty scored); Kovačević (penalty scored); Bratić (penalty scored); Puškarić (penalty missed)		(penalty scored) Jokić; (penalty scored) Bojović; (penalty scored) Meleg; (penalty scored) Stevanović; (penalty scored) Oumarou

21 November 2012	Borac Čačak (II)	0–0 (4–5 p)	Javor	Čačak Stadium, Čačak
13:00				Attendance: 1,000; Referee: Boško Jovanetić
	Penalties
	Rašković (penalty scored); Zoćević (penalty missed); Živković (penalty scored); Jovančić (penalty scored); Jeremić (penalty scored); Boranijašević (penalty missed)		(penalty scored) Eliomar; (penalty scored) Momčilović; (penalty missed) Vidić; (penalty scored) Josović; (penalty scored) Vlašić; (penalty scored) Ostojić

21 November 2012	Red Star	1–3	OFK Beograd	Stadion FK Crvena Zvezda, Belgrade
16:00	Lazović 31'		13', 62' Grbić; 63' Bogavac	Attendance: 7,400; Referee: Milenko Vukadinović

== Semi-finals ==
4 winners from Quarter finals (Vojvodina, Jagodina, OFK Beograd and Javor) took part in this stage of the competition. Semi-finals were contested over two legs. Aggregate winners qualified for the Cup finals. If the scores are tied over two legs, away goals rule will be used. If the score is still tied extra-time will be played, with penalty shoot-out to follow if the aggregate score is tied after extra-time. The draw was held on 12 December 2012. There were no seedings in the draw. First legs were played on 13 March 2013, while second legs were played on 17 April 2013.

Team 1	Agg.	Team 2	1st leg	2nd leg
Vojvodina	2–1	OFK Beograd	1–0	1–1
Javor	2–4	Jagodina	1–0	1–4

=== First legs ===
13 March 2013 SF	Vojvodina	1–0	OFK Beograd	Karađorđe Stadium, Novi Sad
18:00	Oumarou 71'			Attendance: 8,000; Referee: Milorad Mažić

13 March 2013 SF	Javor	1–0	Jagodina	Stadion kraj Moravice, Ivanjica
14:00	Stojaković 55'			Attendance: 3,000; Referee: Milenko Vukadinović

=== Second legs ===
17 April 2013 SF	OFK Beograd	1–1	Vojvodina	Omladinski Stadium, Belgrade
16:00	Mijić 54'		Radoja 61'	Attendance: 6,000; Referee: Milenko Vukadinocić

17 April 2013 SF	Jagodina	4–1	Javor	Stadion FK Jagodina, Jagodina
20:00	Gogić 13'; Vlašić 22' (o.g.); M. Stojanović 34'; Lepović 61'		Momčilović 19'	Attendance: 5,000; Referee: Majo Vujović

== Final ==
2 winners from Semi-finals took part in the single-legged final. Extra time is played if the score is tied after 90 minutes, with penalty shoot-out to follow if the score is still tied after extra time. The final game was played on 8 May 2013, at Partizan Stadium in Belgrade.

8 May 2013	Jagodina	1–0	Vojvodina	Partizan Stadium, Belgrade
20:30	Đurić 15' (pen.)			Attendance: 15,000; Referee: Milorad Mažić
