= 2014–15 FK Borac Čačak season =

Serbian football club season

Fudbalski klub Borac Čačak (Serbian Cyrillic: Фудбалски клуб Борац Чачак), or simply Borac Čačak, is a professional football club based in Čačak, Serbia. The word Borac in translation means fighter in English. Mainly because of the horizontally placed stripes, Borac's nickname is Zebre (Zebras). During the 2014/15 campaign they will be competing in the Serbian SuperLiga and Serbian Cup.

== Competitions ==
| | Competition | Position |
|---|---|---|
| (Serbia) | Serbian SuperLiga | |
| (Serbia) | Serbian Cup | |

== Serbian SuperLiga ==
| Pos | Team | Pld | W | D | L | GF | GA | GD | Pts | Qualification or relegation |
|---|---|---|---|---|---|---|---|---|---|---|
| 11 | Spartak Subotica | 30 | 9 | 7 | 14 | 23 | 33 | −10 | 34 | |
| 12 | Voždovac | 30 | 9 | 7 | 14 | 24 | 37 | −13 | 34 | |
| 13 | Borac Čačak | 30 | 8 | 9 | 13 | 29 | 35 | −6 | 33 | |
| 14 | Napredak Kruševac (R) | 30 | 8 | 7 | 15 | 23 | 34 | −11 | 31 | Qualification for play-off |
| 15 | Donji Srem (R) | 30 | 6 | 8 | 16 | 25 | 42 | −17 | 26 | Relegation to Serbian First League |

Source: Serbian SuperLiga
Rules for classification: 1) points; 2) head-to-head points; 3) head-to-head goal difference; 4) head-to-head goals scored; 5) goal difference; 6) number of goals scored.
(R) Relegated

| 9 August 2014 Match 1] | Borac Čačak | 2 - 0 | Donji Srem | Čačak |
| 17:30 | Mutavdžić (yellow card) 57' (goal) 64'; Đenić 85'; Živković (yellow card) 88'; Nemanja Miletić (yellow card) 90' | Report | Lakić-Pešić (yellow card) 50'; Crnomarković (yellow card) 73' | Stadium: Čačak Stadium; Attendance: 2,500; Referee: (Serbia) Novica Anđelovski |

| 16 August 2014 Match 2 | Rad | 2 - 1 | Borac Čačak | Belgrade |
| 17:30 | Simić (yellow card) 33'; Vico (yellow card) 45'; Mihajlović 55'; Stanojević (yellow card) 66'; Maraš 70' | Summary | Stojanović (yellow card) 41'; Živković 41'; Đenić (yellow card) 49' | Stadium: Stadion Kralj Petar I Attendance: / Referee: (Serbia) Robert Kiš |

| 23 August 2014 Match 3 | Borac Čačak | 0 - 0 | Čukarički Belgrade | Čačak |
| 20:00 | Mutavdžić (yellow card) 71' | Summary | Ristić (yellow card) 27'; Lucas (yellow card) 88'; Brežančić (yellow card) 90' | Stadium: Čačak Stadium; Attendance: 3,000; Referee: (Serbia) Sran Obradović |

| 30 August 2014 Match 4 | Radnički 1923 | 0 - 1 | Borac Čačak | Kragujevac |
| 17:00 | | | Milojević 72' | Stadium: Čika Dača Stadium; Attendance: 2,000; Referee: (Serbia) Vlado Glođović |

| 13 September 2014 Match 5 | Borac Čačak | 1 - 1 | OFK Beograd | Čačak |
| 19:30 | Mutavdžić (yellow card) 23'; Đenić 75'; Jevtović (yellow card) 79'; Boranijašević (yellow card) 90' | Summary | Cohene 2' (o.g.); Antonov (yellow card) 40' | Stadium: Čačak Stadium; Attendance: 2,000; Referee: (Serbia) Ilija Brdar |

| 20 September 2014 Match 6 | Mladost Lučani | 2 - 1 | Borac Čačak | Lučani |
| 16:00 | Eze 30'; Zonjić 36'; Golemić (yellow card) 38'; Petrović (yellow card) 41'; Milunović (yellow card) 56' | Summary | Boranijašević (yellow card) 35'; Gojković (yellow card) 39' (yellow-red card); Jevtović (yellow card) 55'; Đenić 56'; Božić (yellow card) 88' | Stadium: Mladost Stadium; Attendance: 1,000; Referee: (Serbia) Milorad Mažić |

| 29 September 2014 Match 7 | Borac Čačak | 0 - 1 | Crvena zvezda | Čačak |
| 19:00 | Cohene (yellow card) 43'; Božić (yellow card) 50'; Jevtović (yellow card) 65'; Jovančić (yellow card) 78' | Summary | Gavrić 24' (yellow card) 24'; Pavićević (yellow card) 43'; Lazić (yellow card) 45' | Stadium: Čačak Stadium; Attendance: 6,000; Referee: (Serbia) Aleksandar Vasić |

| 4 October 2014 Match 8 | FK Jagodina | 2 - 0 | Borac Čačak | Jagodina |
| 15:00 | Šušnjar 7'; Đurić 53'; Ožegović (yellow card) 90' | Summary | | Stadium: Jagodina City Stadium; Attendance: 1,000; Referee: (Serbia) Marko Popović |

| 19 October 2014 Match 9 | Borac Čačak | 1 - 1 | Vojvodina Novi Sad | Čačak |
| 20:00 | Božić 39' (pen.) | Summary | Gaćinović 56' | Stadium: Čačak Stadium; Attendance: 1,500; Referee: (Serbia) Dejan Anđelković |

| 25 October 2014 Match 10 | Spartak Subotica | 2 - 2 | Borac Čačak | Subotica |
| 14:30 | Torbica 8' (pen.); Antonić (yellow card) 38'; Milić 56'; Maksimović (yellow card) 68'; Radović (yellow card) 87' | Summary | Mutavdžić 4'; Boranijašević (yellow card) 8'; Božić (yellow card) 12'; Đenić (yellow card) 52'; Jovančić (yellow card) 81'; Mašović 90+2' | Stadium: Subotica City Stadium; Attendance: 350; Referee: (Serbia) Igor Stoilković |

| 1 November 2014 Match 11 | Borac Čačak | 0 - 1 | Napredak Kruševac | Čačak |
| 17:00 | Gojković (yellow card) 75' | Summary | Božović 49' (yellow card) 90+2'; Govedarica (yellow card) 55'; Urošević (yellow card) 60' | Stadium: Čačak Stadium; Attendance: 1,500; Referee: (Serbia) Dejan Filipović |

| 8 November 2014 Match 12 | FK Novi Pazar | 2 - 2 | Borac Čačak | Novi Pazar |
| 17:00 | Tintor 40'; Vuković (yellow card) 42'; Kecap 64'; Udovičić (yellow card) 68'; Pavlović (yellow card) 76' | Summary | Stojanović 6' 12'; Đoković (yellow card) 17'; Cohene (yellow card) 42'; Radunović (yellow card) 65'; Jovančić (yellow card) 71'; Božić (yellow card) 90' | Stadium: Novi Pazar City Stadium; Attendance: 7,000; Referee: (Serbia) Sran Jovanović |

| 22 November 2014 Match 13 | Borac Čačak | 0 - 0 | Radnički Niš | Čačak |
| 17:00 | Đoković (yellow card) 81' | Summary | Pavlović (yellow card) 83' | Stadium: Čačak Stadium; Attendance: 500; Referee: (Serbia) Dejan Santrač |

| 29 November 2014 Match 14 | Borac Čačak | 0 - 0 | Voždovac | Čačak |
| 13:00 | Božić (yellow card) 45+2'; Babić (yellow card) 50'; Boranijašević (yellow card) 56' | Summary | Stanimirović (yellow card) 44'; Beljić (yellow card) 45+2'; Pavlović (yellow card) 56'; Nikolić (yellow card) 64'; Odita (yellow card) 90+4' | Stadium: Čačak Stadium; Attendance: 800; Referee: (Serbia) Milan Ilić |

| 7 December 2014 Match 15 | Partizan Belgrade | 5 - 1 | Borac Čačak | Belgrade |
| 15:00 | Volkov 42'; Škuletić 65' 90+2'; Živković 67'; Ilić 88' | Summary | Đoković 19'; Božić (yellow card) 41'; Gojković (yellow card) 63' | Stadium: Partizan Stadium; Attendance: 2,000; Referee: (Serbia) Novica Anđelovski |

| 21 February 2015 Match 16 | Donji Srem | 0-1 | Borac Čačak | Pećinci |
| 13:30 | Lakićević (yellow card) 45' | Summary | Ožegović 19' (yellow card) 29'; Jovančić (yellow card) 33'; Josović (yellow card) 77' | Stadium: Suvača Sportcenter; Attendance: 500; Referee: (Serbia) Dejan Filipović |

| 28 February 2015 Match 17 | Borac Čačak | 0-1 | Rad | Čačak |
| 13:30 | Josović (yellow card) 50'; Maslać (yellow card) 53' | Summary | Đurić (yellow card) 18'; Mihajlović 32'; Marković (yellow card) 32'; Đurić (yellow card) 35'; Raspopović (yellow card) 55'; Radunović (yellow card) 90' | Stadium: Čačak Stadium; Attendance: 1,500; Referee: (Serbia) Srđan Obradović |

| 7 March 2015 Match 18 | Čukarički Belgrade | 1-1 | Borac Čačak | Belgrade |
| 13:30 | Bojić (yellow card) 12'; Matić 50'; Regan (yellow card) 78' | Summary | Božić (yellow card) 37'; Đerić 66' | Stadium: Čukarički Stadium; Attendance: 600; Referee: (Serbia) Dejan Santrač |

| 14 March 2015 Match 19 | Borac Čačak | 2-0 | Radnički 1923 | Čačak |
| 14:00 | Krunić (yellow card) 34'; Ožegović 39'; Mutavdžić (yellow card) 52'; Jovančić (yellow card) 58'; Đerić (yellow card) 79'; Mašović (yellow card) 88'; Zec 90+2' | Summary | Terzić (yellow card) 68'; Bonsu (yellow card) 77'; Kovačević (yellow card) 85' | Stadium: Čačak Stadium; Attendance: 1,500; Referee: (Serbia) Dejan Dimitrijević |

| 21 March 2015 Match 20 | OFK Beograd | 1-0 | Borac Čačak | Belgrade |
| 14:30 | Liščević 57'; Savić (yellow card) 70' (yellow-red card); Jovanović (yellow card) 77'; Aksentijević (yellow card) 84' | Summary | Božić (yellow card) 15'; Krunić (yellow card) 38'; Maslać (yellow card) 58'; Živković (yellow card) 64'; Gojković (yellow card) 77' | Stadium: Omladinski Stadium; Attendance: 300; Referee: (Serbia) Denis Trailović |

| 4 April 2015 Match 21 | Borac Čačak | 0-1 | Mladost Lučani | Čačak |
| 14:30 | Mutavdžić (yellow card) 39'; Zec (yellow card) 81' | Summary | Gavrić (yellow card) 34'; Pešić (yellow card) 73'; Jovanović 88' | Stadium: Čačak Stadium; Attendance: 1,200; Referee: (Serbia) Bojan Nikolić |

| 9 April 2015 Match 22 | Crvena zvezda | 3-1 | Borac Čačak | Belgrade |
| 18:00 | Jović 11' 50'; Jovanović (yellow card) 51'; Lazović 66' (pen.) | Summary | Maslać (yellow card) 65'; Krunić 80'; Boranijašević (yellow card) 87' | Stadium: Red Star Stadium; Attendance: 7,462; Referee: (Serbia) Dejan Anđelković |

| 18 April 2015 Match 23 | Borac Čačak | 3-1 | FK Jagodina | Čačak |
| 20:00 | Ožegović 6' 34' (yellow card) 45'; Boranijašević (yellow card) 69'; Stojanović 90' | Summary | Milinković (yellow card) 68'; Đurić 70' (pen.); Arsenijević (yellow card) 90' | Stadium: Čačak Stadium; Attendance: 800; Referee: (Serbia) Aleksandar Vasić |

| 25 April 2015 Match 24 | Vojvodina Novi Sad | 1-3 | Borac Čačak | Novi Sad |
| 17:30 | Luković (yellow card) 33'; Sekulić (yellow card) 41'; Vasilić (yellow card) 45'; Makarić 90' | Summary | Živković (yellow card) 63'; Mutavdžić 76'; Jevtović 78'; Krunić 90' | Stadium: Karađorđe Stadium; Attendance: 500; Referee: (Serbia) Milian Ilic |

| 29 April 2015 Match 25 | Borac Čačak | 1-0 | Spartak Subotica | Čačak |
| 19:00 | Ožegović 45' | Summary | Dukić (yellow card) 37' | Stadium: Čačak Stadium; Attendance: 1,500; Referee: (Serbia) Vlado Glodović |

| 3 May 2015 Match 26 | Napredak Kruševac | 2-1 | Borac Čačak | Kruševac |
| 19:00 | Dimitrov 43'; Lemajić (yellow card) 45'; Trujić 81' (yellow card) 82' | Summary | Gojković (yellow card) 45'; Zec 52'; Krunić (yellow card) 72'; Jovančić (yellow card) 76' | Stadium: Mladost Stadium; Attendance: 3,500; Referee: (Serbia) Milan Jeremic |

| 9 May 2015 Match 27 | Borac Čačak | 1-0 | FK Novi Pazar | Čačak |
| 19:00 | Stojanović (yellow card) 34'; Gojković (yellow card) 45'; Živković 59' (pen.); Krunić (yellow card) 82' | Summary | Tintor (yellow card) 60'; Stevanović (yellow card) 69'; Zečević (yellow card) 69'; Mijić (yellow card) 78' | Stadium: Čačak Stadium; Attendance: 3,000; Referee: (Serbia) Dalibor Manojlović |

| 13 May 2015 Match 28 | Radnički Niš | 1-0 | Borac Čačak | Niš |
| 17:00 | Zemlianukhin 60'; Lakić-Pešić (yellow card) 70'; Bulatović (yellow card) 86' | Summary | Boranijašević (yellow card) 89'; Jovančić (yellow card) 90' | Stadium: Čair Stadium; Attendance: 2,000; Referee: (Serbia) Srđan Jovanović |

| 16 May 2015 Match 29 | Voždovac | 1-0 | Borac Čačak | Belgrade |
| 17:00 | Adamović 60'; Kitanovski (yellow card) 68'; Pavlović (yellow card) 87'; Sikimić (yellow card) 89' | Summary | Mutavdžić (yellow card) 46' | Stadium: Voždovac Stadium; Attendance: 600; Referee: (Serbia) Vlado Glodović |

| 30 May 2015 Match 30 | Borac Čačak | - | Partizan Belgrade | Čačak |
| 17:00 | | | | Stadium: Čačak Stadium |

== Serbian Cup ==
| 24 September 2014 Round 1 | Red Star Belgrade | 1 - 0 | Borac Čačak | Belgrade |
| 19:00 | Pavićević (yellow card); Despotović (yellow card) (goal) 50' | Summary | | Stadium: Red Star Stadium; Attendance: 4,183; Referee: (Serbia) Robert Kiš |
