= Marko Rajković =

Serbian footballer

Personal information
- Date of birth: 13 November 1992 (age 33)
- Place of birth: Belgrade, FR Yugoslavia
- Height: 1.93 m (6 ft 4 in)
- Position: Striker

Team information
- Current team: Brindisi

Senior career*
Years	Team	Apps	(Gls)
2009–2011	Resnik	6	(1)
2010	Grafičar Beograd	1	(0)
2011	Resnik	14	(1)
2011–2013	Sinđelić Beograd	60	(24)
2013–2014	Teleoptik	3	(2)
2014–2016	Apolonia Fier	56	(12)
2016–2017	Kolubara	23	(5)
2017–2018	Metalac Gornji Milanovac	22	(2)
2018	Sloboda Užice	16	(3)
2019	Sileks	18	(4)
2019	Akademija Pandev	14	(4)
2020	Happy Valley	1	(0)
2020–2021	Zvijezda 09	9	(5)
2021	Boeung Ket	7	(1)
2021	Radnički Sremska Mitrovica	16	(4)
2022–2023	Gimhae	28	(10)
2023	Francavilla	16	(9)
2023–2024	Casarano	30	(11)
2024	Reggina	4	(1)
2024–	Brindisi	0	(0)
- * Club domestic league appearances and goals as of 17 November 2024

Marko Rajković (Serbian Cyrillic: Марко Рајковић; born 13 November 1992) is a Serbian professional footballer who plays for Italian Serie D club Brindisi.
