= Nikola Stanković =

Nikola Stanković may refer to:

- Nikola Stanković (footballer, born 1993), Serbian footballer
- Nikola Stanković (footballer, born 2003), Serbian footballer
