= Rade Krunić =

Bosnian footballer (born 1993)

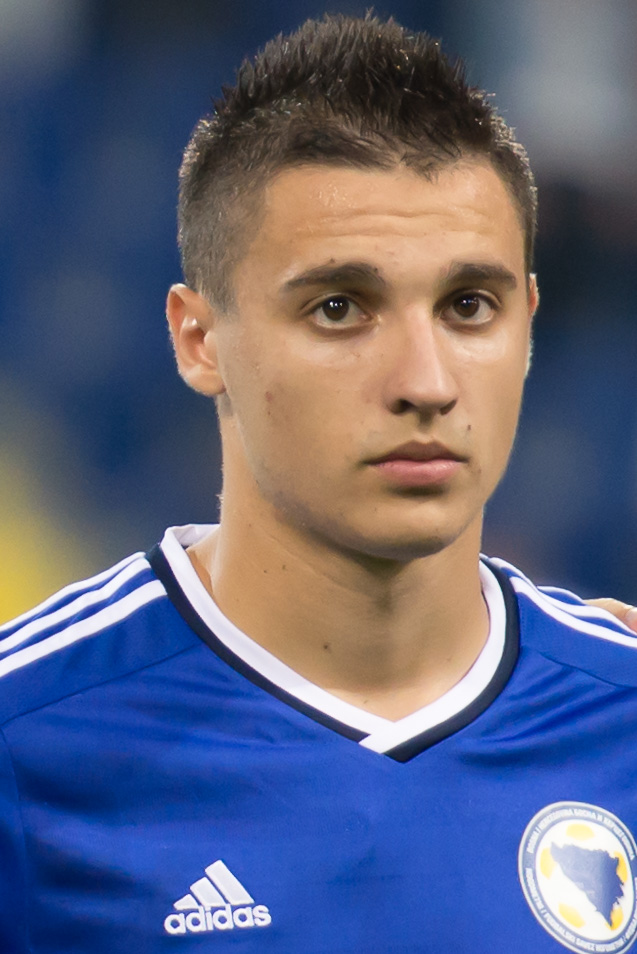
- Krunić with Bosnia and Herzegovina U21 in 2014

Personal information
- Date of birth: 7 October 1993 (age 33)
- Place of birth: Foča, Bosnia and Herzegovina
- Height: 1.84 m (6 ft 0 in)
- Position: Midfielder

Team information
- Current team: Red Star Belgrade
- Number: 33

Youth career
- 2006–2011: Sutjeska Foča

Senior career*
Years	Team	Apps	(Gls)
2011–2013	Sutjeska Foča	15	(3)
2013–2014	Donji Srem	40	(4)
2014–2015	Hellas Verona	0	(0)
2014	→ Donji Srem (loan)	11	(1)
2015	Borac Čačak	13	(2)
2015–2019	Empoli	116	(13)
2019–2024	Milan	101	(1)
2024	→ Fenerbahçe (loan)	12	(0)
2024	Fenerbahçe	1	(0)
2024–	Red Star Belgrade	57	(6)

International career
2013–2014	Bosnia and Herzegovina U21	8	(0)
2016–2024	Bosnia and Herzegovina	34	(4)
- * Club domestic league appearances and goals as of 21 November 2026

Rade Krunić (pronounced [râːde krûːnitɕ]; born 7 October 1993) is a Bosnian professional footballer who plays as a midfielder for Serbian SuperLiga club Red Star Belgrade.

Krunić started his professional career at Sutjeska Foča, before joining Donji Srem in 2013. In 2014, he moved to Hellas Verona, who loaned him back to Donji Srem later that year. In 2015, he switched to Borac Čačak. Later that year, he signed with Empoli. Five years later, Krunić was transferred to Milan, who sent him on loan to Fenerbahçe in 2024, with whom he signed permanently later that year. He moved to Red Star Belgrade in 2024.

A former youth international for Bosnia and Herzegovina, Krunić made his senior international debut in 2016, earning over 30 caps since.

== Club career ==
=== Early career ===
Krunić came through the youth setup of his hometown club Sutjeska Foča, which he joined in 2006. He made his professional debut in 2011 at the age of 17. On 6 November, he scored his first professional goal against Modriča, which secured the victory for his team.

In January 2013, he signed with Serbian side Donji Srem.

In the summer of 2014, Krunić moved to Italian outfit Hellas Verona, who loaned him back to Donji Srem.

In January 2015, he switched to Borac Čačak.

=== Empoli ===
In July, Krunić joined Empoli on a three-year contract. He made his official debut for the squad against Sassuolo on 4 October. On 24 October, he scored his first goal for Empoli in a triumph over Genoa.

In October 2017, he extended his deal with the team until June 2021.

Krunić was an important piece in Empoli's conquest of the Serie B title, his first trophy with the club, which was sealed on 28 April 2018 and earned them promotion to the Serie A just one season after being relegated. He had an impact of 5 goals and 10 assists.

On 1 December, he played his 100th game for the side against SPAL and managed to score a goal.

=== Milan ===
In July 2019, Krunić was transferred to Milan for an undisclosed fee, speculated to be in the region of €8 million.

==== 2019–20 season ====
He made his competitive debut for the team on 29 September in a loss to Fiorentina. On 3 November, he started his first match for Milan against Lazio.

In February 2020, he suffered a foot injury, which was diagnosed as a broken foot and was ruled out for at least a month. Over four months after the injury, on 4 July, he returned to the pitch.

==== 2020–21 season ====
Krunić debuted in the season on 21 September against Bologna. On 22 October, he scored his first goal for Milan in a UEFA Europa League tie against Celtic. Four months later, he scored his first league goal against his former squad Hellas Verona.

==== 2021–22 season ====
Krunić played his first fixture of the campaign in a defeat of Sampdoria on 23 August 2021.

On 19 October, he debuted in the UEFA Champions League away at Porto.

He won his first title with the club on 22 May 2022, when they were crowned league champions after 11 years.

==== 2022–23 season ====
Krunić appeared in his first encounter of the season against Udinese on 13 August.

In September, he signed a new three-year contract with Milan.

He made his 100th appearance for the side against Dinamo Zagreb on 25 October.

On 2 November, he scored his first UEFA Champions League goal in a win over Red Bull Salzburg.

==== 2023–24 season ====
Krunić made his season debut on 21 August against Bologna.

He appeared in his 100th clash for Milan in the Serie A against Lecce on 11 November.

=== Fenerbahçe ===
In January 2024, Krunić was sent on a six-month loan to Turkish outfit Fenerbahçe. He debuted officially for the club in a Turkish Cup contest against Adanaspor on 17 January. A week later, he made his league debut against Samsunspor.

In July, Fenerbahçe signed him on a three-year deal.

=== Red Star Belgrade ===
In September, Krunić joined Red Star Belgrade on a contract until June 2027. He debuted competitively for the team on 14 September against Napredak Kruševac. On 27 November, he scored his first goal for Red Star Belgrade in a UEFA Champions League clash against VfB Stuttgart. Three weeks later, he scored a brace in a beating of Čukarički, which were his first league goals for the side. He won his first piece of silverware with the club on 6 April 2025, when they were proclaimed league champions.

In November 2026, he put pen to paper on a new two-year deal with the squad.

== International career ==
Krunić was a member of the Bosnia and Herzegovina under-21 team under coach Vlado Jagodić.

In November 2015, he received his first senior call up, for the UEFA Euro 2016 qualifying play-offs against Republic of Ireland, but had to wait until 3 June 2016 to make his debut in a 2016 Kirin Cup game against Denmark.

On 23 March 2019, in a UEFA Euro 2020 qualifier against Armenia, Krunić scored his first senior international goal.

== Personal life ==
Krunić married his long-time girlfriend Ivana in May 2022. Together they have two children, a son named Andrej and a daughter named Neva.

== Career statistics ==
=== Club ===
As of match played 21 November 2026

Appearances and goals by club, season and competition
Club	Season	League			National cup (Note: Includes Bosnian Cup, Serbian Cup, Coppa Italia, Turkish Cup)		Continental		Total	
Club	Season	Division	Apps	Goals	Apps	Goals	Apps	Goals	Apps	Goals
Sutjeska Foča	2011–12	First League of the RS	9	2	–		–		9	2
Sutjeska Foča	2012–13	First League of the RS	6	1	2	0	–		8	1
Sutjeska Foča	Total		15	3	2	0	–		17	3
Donji Srem	2012–13	Serbian SuperLiga	13	2	–		–		13	2
Donji Srem	2013–14	Serbian SuperLiga	27	2	3	0	–		30	2
Donji Srem (loan)	2014–15	Serbian SuperLiga	11	1	1	0	–		12	1
Donji Srem (loan)	Total		51	5	4	0	–		55	5
Borac Čačak	2014–15	Serbian SuperLiga	13	2	–		–		13	2
Empoli	2015–16	Serie A	15	1	1	0	–		16	1
Empoli	2016–17	Serie A	32	2	1	0	–		33	2
Empoli	2017–18	Serie B	36	5	0	0	–		36	5
Empoli	2018–19	Serie A	33	5	1	0	–		34	5
Empoli	Total		116	13	3	0	–		119	13
Milan	2019–20	Serie A	15	0	3	0	–		18	0
Milan	2020–21	Serie A	25	1	1	0	12 (Note: Appearances in UEFA Europa League)	1	38	2
Milan	2021–22	Serie A	28	0	3	0	4 (Note: Appearances in UEFA Champions League)	0	35	0
Milan	2022–23	Serie A	23	0	0	0	11	1	34	1
Milan	2023–24	Serie A	10	0	0	0	4	0	14	0
Milan	Total		101	1	7	0	31	2	139	3
Fenerbahçe (loan)	2023–24	Süper Lig	12	0	3	0	3 (Note: Appearances in UEFA Conference League)	0	18	0
Fenerbahçe	2024–25	Süper Lig	1	0	0	0	3	0	4	0
Fenerbahçe	Total		13	0	3	0	6	0	22	0
Red Star Belgrade	2024–25	Serbian SuperLiga	23	3	3	0	8	1	34	4
Red Star Belgrade	2025–26	Serbian SuperLiga	26	2	3	0	13 (Note: Five appearances in UEFA Champions League; eight appearances in UEFA Europa League)	2	42	4
Red Star Belgrade	2026–27	Serbian SuperLiga	8	1	0	0	8 (Note: Three appearances in UEFA Champions League; two appearances in UEFA Europa League; three appearances, one goal in UEFA Conference League)	1	16	2
Red Star Belgrade	Total		57	6	6	0	29	4	92	10
Career total			366	30	25	0	66	6	457	36

=== International ===
Appearances and goals by national team and year
National team	Year	Apps	Goals
Bosnia and Herzegovina
Bosnia and Herzegovina	2016	1	0
Bosnia and Herzegovina	2017	2	0
Bosnia and Herzegovina	2018	5	0
Bosnia and Herzegovina	2019	5	1
Bosnia and Herzegovina	2020	5	1
Bosnia and Herzegovina	2021	5	0
Bosnia and Herzegovina	2022	4	0
Bosnia and Herzegovina	2023	5	2
Bosnia and Herzegovina	2024	2	0
Total		34	4

Scores and results list Bosnia and Herzegovina's goal tally first, score column indicates score after each Krunić goal.

List of international goals scored by Rade Krunić
No.	Date	Venue	Cap	Opponent	Score	Result	Competition
1	23 March 2019	Grbavica, Sarajevo, Bosnia and Herzegovina	9	Armenia	1–0	2–1	UEFA Euro 2020 qualifying
2	8 October 2020	Grbavica, Sarajevo, Bosnia and Herzegovina	14	Northern Ireland	1–0	1–1	UEFA Euro 2020 qualifying play-offs
3	23 March 2023	Bilino Polje, Zenica, Bosnia and Herzegovina	28	Iceland	1–0	3–0	UEFA Euro 2024 qualifying
4	23 March 2023	Bilino Polje, Zenica, Bosnia and Herzegovina	28	Iceland	2–0	3–0	UEFA Euro 2024 qualifying

== Honours ==
Empoli

- Serie B: 2017–18

Milan

- Serie A: 2021–22

Red Star Belgrade

- Serbian SuperLiga: 2024–25, 2025–26
- Serbian Cup: 2024–25, 2025–26
