= Miloš Lepović =

Serbian footballer

Personal information
- Full name: Miloš Lepović
- Date of birth: 3 October 1987 (age 39)
- Place of birth: Kragujevac, SFR Yugoslavia
- Height: 1.84 m (6 ft 1/2 in)
- Position: Attacking midfielder

Senior career*
Years	Team	Apps	(Gls)
2003–2007	Radnički Kragujevac	21	(1)
2005	→ Mokra Gora (loan)		
2007–2008	Mokra Gora		
2008	Vardar	10	(1)
2009–2012	Radnički Kragujevac	83	(17)
2012–2015	Jagodina	82	(14)
2015–2016	Mladost Lučani	27	(1)
2016	Novi Pazar	17	(0)
2017–2019	Balzan	42	(4)
2019–2020	OFK Beograd	0	(0)
2020–2022	Resnik		
- * Club domestic league appearances and goals as of 16:43, 24 July 2019 (UTC)

Miloš Lepović (Serbian Cyrillic: Милош Леповић, born 3 October 1987) is a Serbian football midfielder.

== Career ==
Lepović has spent the vast majority of his career so far with his home town club, Radnički Kragujevac. In two occasions, he was a member of Mokra Gora and have spent a half-season with Macedonian giants Vardar.

During winter 2009, he came back to Radnički Kragujevac and helped the club win two successive promotions, from Serbian SuperLiga Serbian League West. In 2012, Lepović had a dispute with a chairman of Radnički and left the club, soon to join FK Jagodina, also a Serbian SuperLiga member team.

On July 5, 2019, OFK Beograd announced that Lepović had joined the club.

== Honours ==
Radnički Kragujevac

- Serbian First League: 2010–11

Jagodina

- Serbian Cup: 2013
