= Ivan Đoković =

Serbian footballer

Personal information
- Date of birth: 20 December 1982 (age 43)
- Place of birth: Čačak, SFR Yugoslavia
- Height: 1.94 m (6 ft 4 in)
- Positions: Defensive midfielder; centre-back

Senior career*
Years	Team	Apps	(Gls)
2001–2002	Polet Ljubić	22	(4)
2002–2006	Borac Čačak	71	(3)
2007	UTA Arad	7	(0)
2008–2009	Borac Čačak	43	(4)
2010–2012	Košice	57	(7)
2012	Novi Pazar	3	(0)
2012–2016	Borac Čačak	36	(9)
2017–2019	Polet Ljubić		
Total		239	(27)
- * Club domestic league appearances and goals

Ivan Đoković (Serbian Cyrillic: Иван Ђоковић; born 20 December 1982) is a Serbian retired footballer who played as a defensive midfielder.
