= Dario Božičić =

Serbian footballer (born 1989)

Personal information
- Full name: Dario Božičić
- Date of birth: 30 August 1989 (age 37)
- Place of birth: Novi Sad, SFR Yugoslavia
- Height: 1.85 m (6 ft 1 in)
- Positions: Left midfielder; left-back

Team information
- Current team: Radnički 1918 Ratkovo

Senior career*
Years	Team	Apps	(Gls)
2005–2008	Tekstilac Odžaci	85	(16)
2008–2011	Bežanija	92	(2)
2011–2012	Rad	4	(0)
2012	→ Novi Sad (loan)	14	(0)
2013	BSK Borča	13	(1)
2013–2014	Bežanija	22	(0)
2014	Donji Srem	1	(0)
2015	Bežanija	15	(0)
2015-2016	OFK Odžaci	15	(0)
2017	Feniks		
2018-2022	Tekstilac Odžaci		
2022-	Radnički 1918 Ratkovo		
- * Club domestic league appearances and goals as of 30 May 2015

Dario Božičić (Cyrillic: Дарио Божичић; born 30 August 1989) is a Serbian professional footballer who plays as a midfielder.
