= Miloš Tintor =

Serbian footballer

Personal information
- Full name: Miloš Tintor
- Date of birth: August 21, 1986 (age 40)
- Place of birth: Knin, SR Croatia, SFR Yugoslavia
- Height: 2.02 m (6 ft 8 in)
- Position: Centre-back

Youth career
- 1995–2000: OFK Beograd
- 2000–2003: BSK Borča

Senior career*
Years	Team	Apps	(Gls)
2003–2005	BSK Borča	22	(0)
2005–2006	PKB Padinska Skela	18	(3)
2006–2009	Budućnost Valjevo	60	(4)
2009–2010	Železničar Lajkovac	23	(1)
2010–2014	Radnički Kragujevac	93	(11)
2014–2016	Novi Pazar	63	(3)
2017	OFK Beograd	5	(0)
2017	Loznica		
2018–2019	Temnić		
2020–2021	Železničar Lajkovac		
2021-2022	Budućnost Valjevo		
2022	OFK Divci		
- * Club domestic league appearances and goals as of 4 April 2017

Miloš Tintor (Serbian Cyrillic: Милош Тинтор; born August 21, 1986) is a Serbian retired footballer, who played for FK Loznica.

Born in Knin, SR Croatia, SFR Yugoslavia, he moved to Serbia at a young age and began playing in the youth team of OFK Beograd. In 2000, he moved to FK BSK Borča and debuted as senior in 2003. He later played with lower league clubs PKB Padinska Skela, FK Budućnost Valjevo and FK Železničar Lajkovac before signing with FK Radnički 1923 in the summer of 2010.
