= Miljan Milivojev =

Serbian footballer

Personal information
- Full name: Miljan Milivojev
- Date of birth: 21 November 1988 (age 37)
- Place of birth: Zrenjanin, SFR Yugoslavia
- Height: 1.85 m (6 ft 1 in)
- Position: Striker

Team information
- Current team: Naftagas Elemir

Senior career*
Years	Team	Apps	(Gls)
2006–2010	Rusanda Melenci		
2010–2011	Senta	27	(17)
2011–2013	Spartak Subotica	40	(4)
2014–2015	Dolina Padina	12	(0)
2015-2016	Vittoriosa Stars	(4)	(3)
2016-2017	St. Lucia		
2017-2020	Radnički Zrenjanin		
2020-2024	Naftagas Elemir		
2024-	FK Rusanda Melenci		
- * Club domestic league appearances and goals as of 22 June 2014

Miljan Milivojev (Serbian Cyrillic: Миљан Миливојев; born 21 November 1988) is a Serbian football striker who plays for FK Rusanda Melenci.
