= Marko Zoćević =

Serbian footballer

Personal information
- Date of birth: 19 May 1993 (age 33)
- Place of birth: Čačak, FR Yugoslavia
- Height: 1.80 m (5 ft 11 in)
- Position: Midfielder

Youth career
- Borac Čačak

Senior career*
Years	Team	Apps	(Gls)
2011–2015	Borac Čačak	56	(2)
2015	Vojvodina	7	(0)
2016	Mladost Lučani	1	(0)
2016–2018	Borac Čačak	65	(2)
2018	Voždovac	9	(0)
2019	AGMK Olmaliq	0	(0)
2019–2021	Metalac GM	51	(0)
2021–2022	Sutjeska Nikšić	18	(0)
2022–2023	Zvijezda 09	23	(2)
2023–2024	OFK Vršac	25	(1)
2024	FAP		
2025	Sloga Kraljevo		
- * Club domestic league appearances and goals as of 26 December 2023

Marko Zoćević (Serbian Cyrillic: Марко Зоћевић; born 19 May 1993) is a Serbian professional footballer who plays as a midfielder.

== Career ==
=== FC AGMK Olmaliq ===
After leaving FK Voždovac, Zoćević signed with FC AGMK Olmaiq in Uzbekistan.

== Honours ==
Borac Čačak

- Serbian Cup: Runner-up 2011–12
