= Uroš Momić =

Serbian footballer

Personal information
- Full name: Uroš Momić
- Date of birth: 26 March 1992 (age 34)
- Place of birth: Smederevo, SFR Yugoslavia
- Height: 1.80 m (5 ft 11 in)
- Position: Striker

College career
Years	Team	Apps	(Gls)
2015–2016	Harcum Bears	28	(31)
2017–2018	Bryant & Stratton Bobcats	23	(24)

Senior career*
Years	Team	Apps	(Gls)
–2012	ČSK Čelarevo		
2012–2013	Smederevo	27	(1)
2013	Radnički Pirot		
2013–2014	Dolina Padina	16	(0)
2014	Semendrija 1924		
2019–	Rochester Lancers	12	(5)
2019–	Utica City FC (indoor)	18	(13)
2020	Radnički Pirot	7	(0)
2021	RSK Rabrovo		
- * Club domestic league appearances and goals as of May 16, 2020

Uroš Momić (Serbian: Урош Момић; born 26 March 1992), commonly known as Momo is a Serbian footballer who plays as a forward for Radnički Pirot. During the 2019-20 Utica City season, he was introduced by his nickname Momo, and he made the MASL All-Rookie Honorable Mention.
