= Bumbarevo Brdo =

Bumbarevo Brdo Бумбарево Брдо (Serbian)
- Village (Selo)
- Location within Serbia
- Country: Serbia
- District: Šumadija
- Municipality: Knić

Population (2022)
  - Total: 359
- Time zone: UTC+1 (CET)
  - Summer (DST): UTC+2 (CEST)

Bumbarevo Brdo is a village situated in Knić municipality, Šumadija District in Serbia.

According to the 2022 census, the village had a population of 359 inhabitants.

Local football club Partizan play their home games in the Gradski stadion.
