= Slaven Stanković =

Serbian footballer

Personal information
- Date of birth: 5 January 1982 (age 44)
- Place of birth: Belgrade, SFR Yugoslavia
- Height: 1.73 m (5 ft 8 in)
- Position: Midfielder

Youth career
- 1998–1999: Rudar Kosovska Mitrovica

Senior career*
Years	Team	Apps	(Gls)
2000–2005	Zemun	81	(9)
2005	Khazar Lankaran	2	(0)
2006	Voždovac	7	(0)
2006–2007	Jedinstvo Ub	11	(0)
2007	→ Zemun (loan)	12	(5)
2007–2008	Vardar	21	(1)
2008–2009	Sevojno	11	(1)
2009–2011	Zemun	45	(6)
2011	Beroe Stara Zagora	5	(0)
2012	Napredak Kruševac		
2012–2013	Kolubara		
2013–2014	Zemun		
- * Club domestic league appearances and goals

Slaven Stanković (Serbian Cyrillic: Славен Станковић; born January 5, 1982) is a Serbian retired football player who played as a midfielder.

He started playing at FK Rudar Kosovska Mitrovica in the season 1998–99. He then moved to FK Zemun and played in the First League of FR Yugoslavia.
