= Stefan Živković =

Serbian footballer

Personal information
- Full name: Stefan Živković
- Date of birth: 1 June 1990 (age 36)
- Place of birth: Kruševac, SR Serbia, Yugoslavia
- Height: 1.84 m (6 ft 0 in)
- Position: Left back

Team information
- Current team: Jedinstvo Stara Pazova

Youth career
- Red Star Belgrade

Senior career*
Years	Team	Apps	(Gls)
2008–2010	Resnik	27	(2)
2010–2011	Hajduk Beograd	37	(11)
2012–2015	Borac Čačak	103	(5)
2016–2017	Čukarički	35	(0)
2017	Irtysh	33	(4)
2018	Atyrau	13	(0)
2018–2019	Zemun	10	(0)
2019	Larissa	14	(0)
2020	Zhetysu	17	(0)
2021	Turan	24	(2)
2022	Kyzylzhar	8	(0)
2023	Mladost Lučani	0	(0)
2023-2025	Hajduk 1912		
2025-	Jedinstvo Stara Pazova		

International career
2007	Serbia U19	1	(0)
- * Club domestic league appearances and goals as of 12 November 2022

Stefan Živković (Serbian Cyrillic: Стефан Живковић; Born 1 June 1990) is a Serbian professional footballer who plays as a defender for Jedinstvo Stara Pazova.

== Career ==
Born in Kruševac, Živković passed the youth school of Red Star Belgrade. Later he was with Resnik and Hajduk Beograd. Živković joined Borac Čačak in the winter break off-season 2011–12. He made 13 SuperLiga appearances with 10 starts, and also played one cup match until the end of his debut season in club. Živković also played one semi-final cup match, in win against Vojvodina. For the next season, Borac was relegated to the Serbian First League. For two seasons Borac spent in the First League, Živković made 38 league and 4 cup matches and scored 2 goals for the 2012–13 period, but he missed the spring half of 2013–14 season. After Borac promoted to the SuperLiga, Živković contributed with 2 goal on 24 matches to survive in league, after the 2014–15 season. For the 2015–16 season, new coach, Nenad Lalatović gave a captain armband to Živković. During the first half of season, Živković played all 22 league matches and scored 1 goal against Voždovac, from penalty kick. He was also a member of 1 cup match, and will remain as the leader of the generation that caused one of the worst defeats of Red Star Belgrade on the Rajko Mitić Stadium. He sued the club together with Nemanja Miletić and Dušan Jovančić ending of November 2015, over unpaid wages. Živković joined FK Čukarički beginning of 2016.

On 10 January 2018, Živković signed for FC Atyrau.

== Career statistics ==
As of 14 December 2016

Club performance			League		Cup		Continental		Total	
Season	Club	League	Apps	Goals	Apps	Goals	Apps	Goals	Apps	Goals
2009–10	Resnik	Serbian League Belgrade	27	2	–				27	2
2010–11	Hajduk Beograd	Serbian League Belgrade	25	7	–				25	7
2011–12	Hajduk Beograd	Serbian League Belgrade	12	4	–				12	4
2011–12	Borac Čačak	Serbian SuperLiga	13	0	1	0	–		13	0
2012–13	Borac Čačak	Serbian First League	24	1	2	0	–		26	1
2013–14	Borac Čačak	Serbian First League	14	1	2	0	–		16	1
2014–15	Borac Čačak	Serbian SuperLiga	24	2	–				24	2
2015–16	Borac Čačak	Serbian SuperLiga	22	1	1	0	–		23	1
2015–16	Čukarički	Serbian SuperLiga	14	0	–				14	0
2016–17	Čukarički	Serbian SuperLiga	16	0	1	0	4	0	21	0
Career total			191	18	7	0	4	0	202	18
