= FK Partizan Bumbarevo Brdo =

Partizan
- Full name: Fudbalski Klub Partizan
- Founded: 1 May 1946; 79 years ago
- Ground: Gradski stadion, Bumbarevo Brdo
- Capacity: 200
- 2020–21: Šumadija District League, 16th
Home colours	Away colours

FK Partizan Bumbarevo Brdo (Serbian Cyrillic: ФК Партизан Бумбарево Брдо) is a Serbian football club based in Bumbarevo Brdo, municipality of Knić.

== History ==
The club was officially founded on 1 May 1946 by members of the Yugoslav Communist Party and was named "Boda Radonjić" in memory of the Partisan fighter in the World War II that was killed in the Battle of Srem. But in 1955, because of the new football regulations, the club had to change its name, and after having been named shortly simply as "FK Boda" a new name had to be chosen. Since the club members were all supporters of the two major Serbian clubs, Belgrade's Red Star and FK Partizan, the decision was made to go to a poll, and the majority of the votes went to Partizan, and since then the club has been competing under the name that still carries today.

The club has experiences difficulties in many periods, but it survived thanks to a number of influential people from the region that supported the club. The main company that helped financially the club was the local Agroprodukt, but the municipality of Knić, to which Bumbarevo Brdo belongs, has also helped with the competing expenses during the seasons of the 2000s.

Since the club has earned promotion to the 3rd tier for the season 2010–11, much help has been provided from Mr. Saša Popović, whose roots come from Bumbarevac, that has provided financing from several companies from Belgrade.

=== Recent league history ===
Season	Division	P	W	D	L	F	A	Pts	Pos
2020–21	5 - Šumadija District League	34	12	6	16	52	80	41 (Note: The club was docked one point.)	16th
2021–22	6 - Inter-municipal league Rača-Knić-Batočina	20	9	1	10	36	36	28	4th
2022–23	6 - Inter-municipal league Rača-Knić-Batočina	20	7	3	10	32	40	24	9th
2023–24	6 - Šumadija League "South"	22	5	2	15	23	52	17	11th
2024–25	7 - Municipal League Knić	14	4	4	6	14	22	16	5th
