= Lazar Čordašić =

Serbian footballer

Personal information
- Full name: Lazar Čordašić
- Date of birth: 21 January 1988 (age 38)
- Place of birth: Osijek, SR Croatia, SFR Yugoslavia
- Height: 1.82 m (6 ft 0 in)
- Position: Defensive midfielder

Team information
- Current team: Tekstilac Odžaci
- Number: 25

Senior career*
Years	Team	Apps	(Gls)
2006–2007	Tekstilac Odžaci	37	(2)
2007–2010	BSK Borča	1	(0)
2008	→ Mladost Apatin (loan)	8	(0)
2009–2010	→ Tekstilac Odžaci (loan)	30	(1)
2010	Tekstilac Odžaci	14	(4)
2011–2014	Donji Srem	80	(3)
2014	Inđija	12	(0)
2015	Proleter Novi Sad	24	(0)
2016	OFK Odžaci	24	(2)
2017	Radnički Pirot	13	(0)
2017–2019	TSC Bačka Topola	27	(0)
2019–2020	Dinamo 1945		
2020	IMT		
2022	Tisa Adorjan		
2022	OFK Bačka		
2023	Kormákur/Hvöt		
2023–	Tekstilac Odžaci	9	(0)
- * Club domestic league appearances and goals as of 10 March 2023

Lazar Čordašić (Serbian Cyrillic: Лазар Чордашић; born 21 January 1988) is a Serbian footballer who plays as a midfielder for Tekstilac Odžaci.

== Club career ==
He has started at Tekstilac Odžaci. After season and half, he moved to BSK Borča, but he played only 1 league match for this club. He had been sent on loan at Mladost Apatin, and later he returned to Tekstilac, on loan, too. After end of loan, he stayed in Tekstilac. In 2010, as a captain of Tekstilac, he was nominated for the best sportsman in Odžaci. During the winter break of the 2010–11 season, he joined in Donji Srem, which won the league in rest of season. After playing with Inđija, Proleter Novi Sad and OFK Odžaci, Čordašić joined Radnički Pirot at the beginning of 2017.
