= Nikola Stanković (footballer, born 1993) =

Serbian footballer

Personal information
- Date of birth: 18 December 1993 (age 32)
- Place of birth: Sombor, FR Yugoslavia
- Height: 1.79 m (5 ft 10 in)
- Position: Left full-back

Team information
- Current team: Kolubara
- Number: 33

Youth career
- Crvenka
- Partizan
- 2010–2012: Inđija

Senior career*
Years	Team	Apps	(Gls)
2012–2015	Inđija	69	(0)
2015–2016	Bačka Palanka	23	(0)
2016–2019	Radnički Niš	77	(1)
2019–2020	Larissa	14	(0)
2020–2021	Voždovac	11	(0)
2021–2022	Radnički Niš	38	(0)
2022–2023	Mladost Novi Sad	8	(0)
2023-	Kolubara	8	(0)

International career^{‡}
2016	Serbia	1	(0)
- * Club domestic league appearances and goals as of 3 July 2024 ‡ National team caps and goals as of 24 April 2019

Nikola Stanković (Serbian Cyrillic: Никола Станковић; born 18 December 1993) is a Serbian professional footballer who plays as a left back for Kolubara.

== Club career ==
Born in Sombor, Nikola passed Crvenka youth categories, and also spent six months with Partizan youth team. He made his first senior appearances during the spring half of the 2011–12 season. Stanković played over 70 matches playing for Inđija between 2012 and 2015. For the 2015–16 season, he moved to OFK Bačka. After the club promoted in the Serbian SuperLiga, he left at the end of season, and later signed three-year contract with Radnički Niš.

== International career ==
Stanković made his international debut for the Serbia national football team in a friendly 3–0 loss to Qatar.

== Career statistics ==
As of 23 September 2018

Appearances and goals by club, season and competition
Club	Season	League			Cup		Continental		Other		Total	
Club	Season	Division	Apps	Goals	Apps	Goals	Apps	Goals	Apps	Goals	Apps	Goals
Inđija	2011–12	Serbian First League	8	0	—		—		—		8	0
Inđija	2012–13	Serbian First League	22	0	2	0	—		—		24	0
Inđija	2013–14	Serbian First League	23	0	1	0	—		—		24	0
Inđija	2014–15	Serbian First League	15	0	—		—		—		15	0
Inđija	Total		68	0	3	0	—		—		71	0
OFK Bačka	2015–16	Serbian First League	22	0	1	0	—		—		23	0
Radnički Niš	2016–17	Serbian SuperLiga	32	0	1	0	—		—		33	0
Radnički Niš	2017–18	Serbian SuperLiga	22	1	1	0	—		—		23	1
Radnički Niš	2018–19	Serbian SuperLiga	8	0	0	0	4	0	—		12	0
Radnički Niš	Total		63	1	2	0	4	0	—		69	1
AEL	2019–20	Super League Greece	14	0	1	0	—		—		15	0
Career total			166	1	7	0	4	0	0	0	177	1
