= Igor Petrović =

Serbian footballer

Personal information
- Date of birth: 18 March 1987 (age 39)
- Place of birth: Kruševac, SFR Yugoslavia
- Height: 1.75 m (5 ft 9 in)
- Position: Left-back

Senior career*
Years	Team	Apps	(Gls)
2005–2013	Napredak Kruševac	101	(2)
2006–2008	→ Trayal Kruševac (loan)		
2013–2014	Mladost Lučani	37	(0)
2015	Moravac Mrštane	7	(0)
2018–2023	Trayal Kruševac	59	(0)
- * Club domestic league appearances and goals as of 25 June 2023

Igor Petrović (Serbian Cyrillic: Игор Петровић; born 18 March 1987) is a Serbian retired footballer.
