= Čačak Stadium =

Stadium in Čačak, Serbia

Borac Stadium
- Stadion kraj Morave
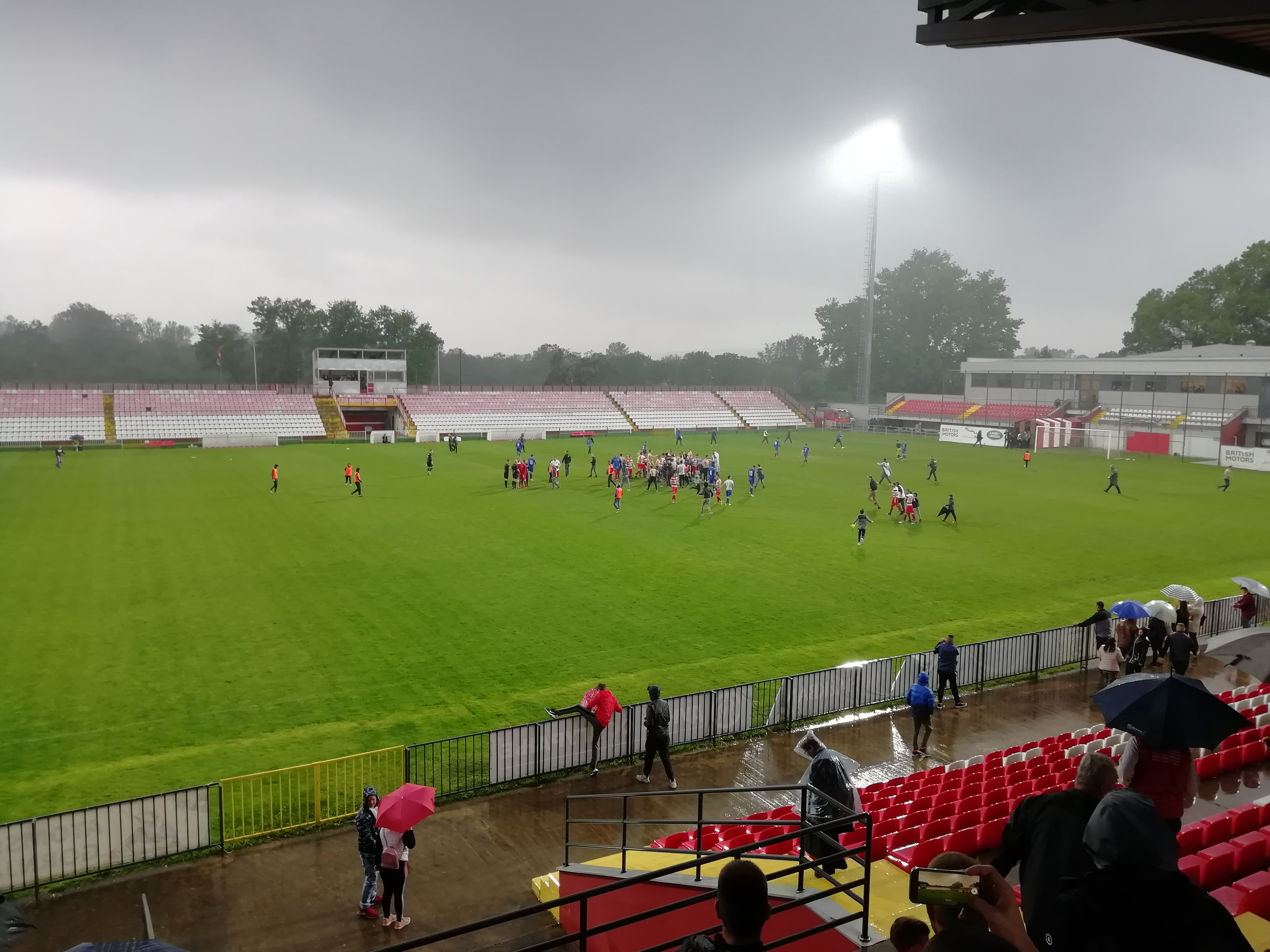
- Čačak Stadium Football Field after game celebration
- Interactive map of Borac Stadium
- Location: Čačak, Serbia
- Coordinates: 43°53′52.15″N 20°20′29.06″E
- Owner: Borac 1926
- Operator: Borac 1926
- Capacity: 8,000
- Surface: Grass
- Field size: 105 x 70 m

Construction
- Built: 1958; 68 years ago
- Renovated: 2007, 2011–2017
- Cost: €3 million (2011–2017 reconstruction)

Tenant
- Borac 1926

Borac Stadium (Serbian Cyrillic: Стадион Борца), colloquially known as the Stadion kraj Morave, is a multi-purpose stadium in Čačak, Serbia. It is the home stadium of football club Borac 1926.

== History ==
The Borac Stadium was opened in 1958. The stadium has undergone reconstruction from 2011 to 2017, in a project that was worth 3 million euros. After the completion of the reconstruction, the stadium is capable of holding 8,000 spectators.

== Gallery ==
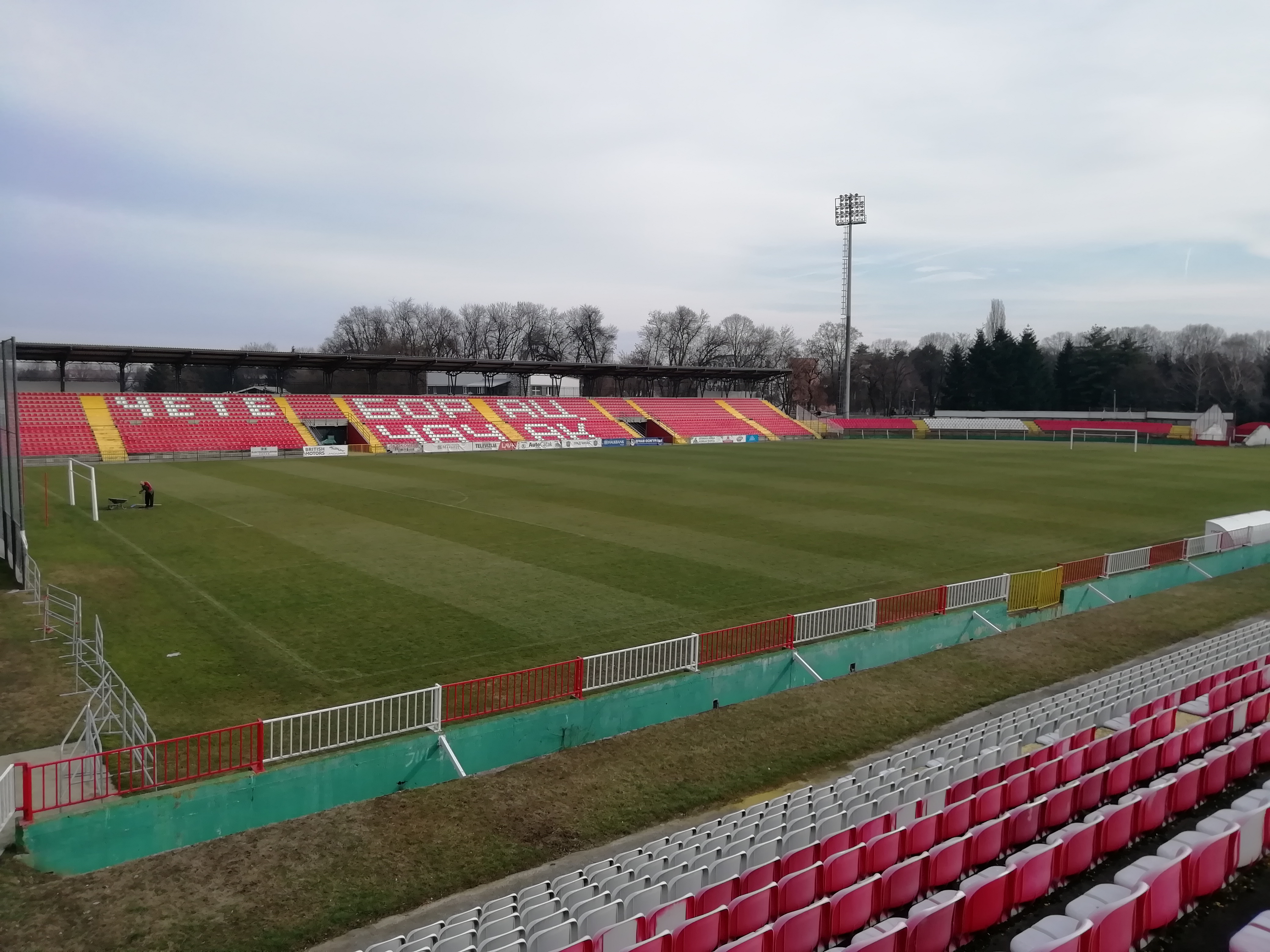
View of Borac Stadium

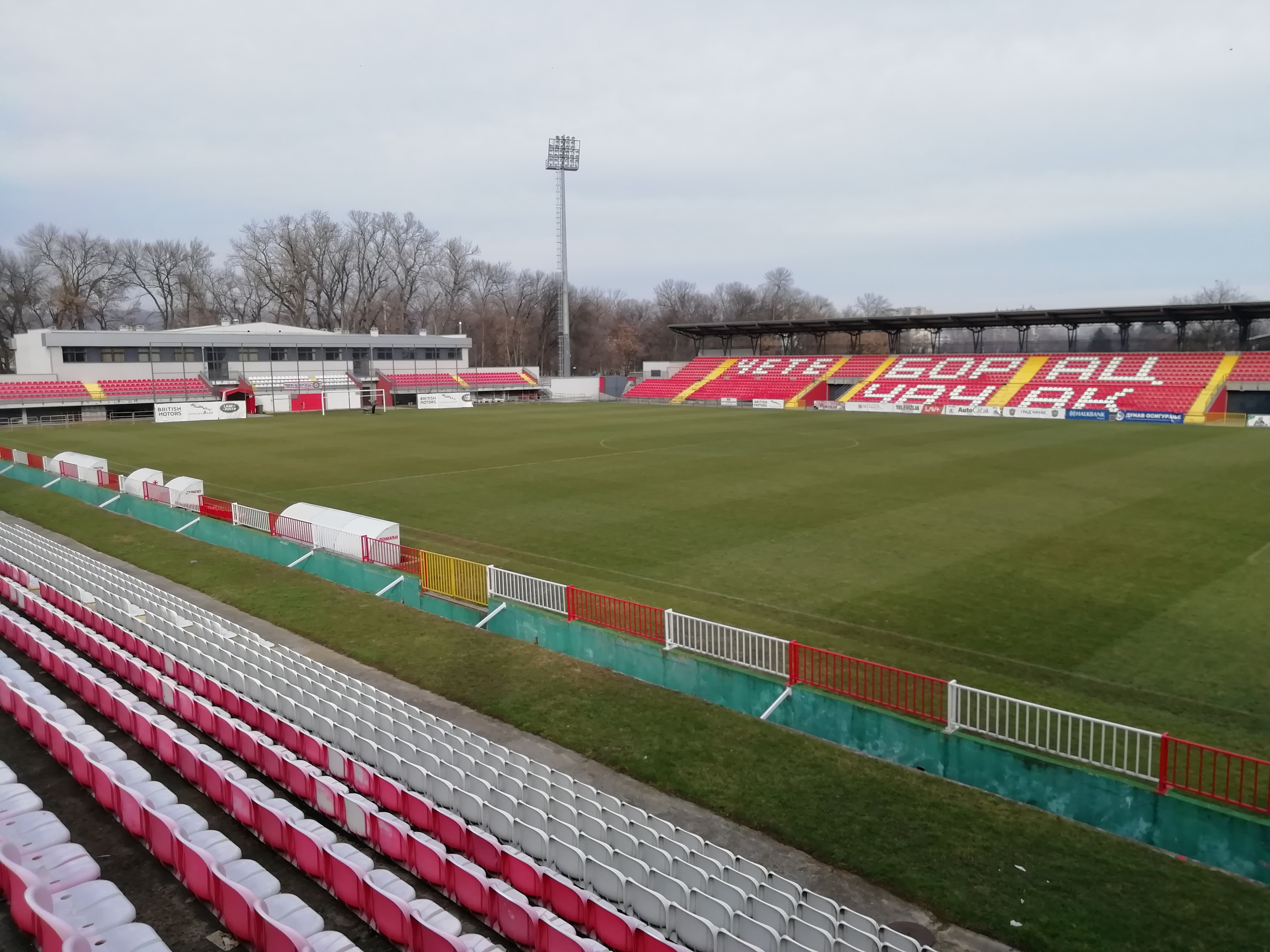
View from West Stand

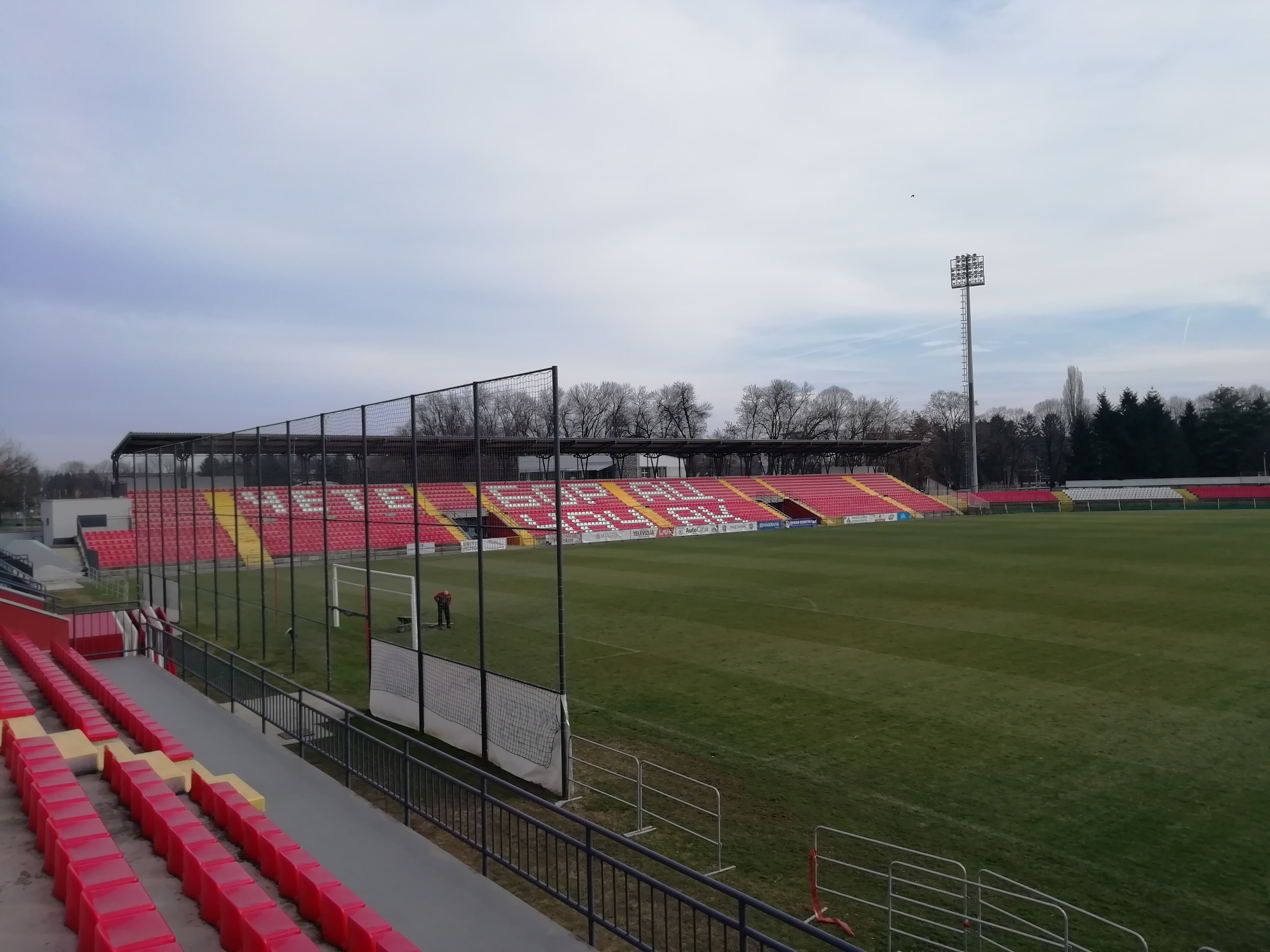
View from North Stand

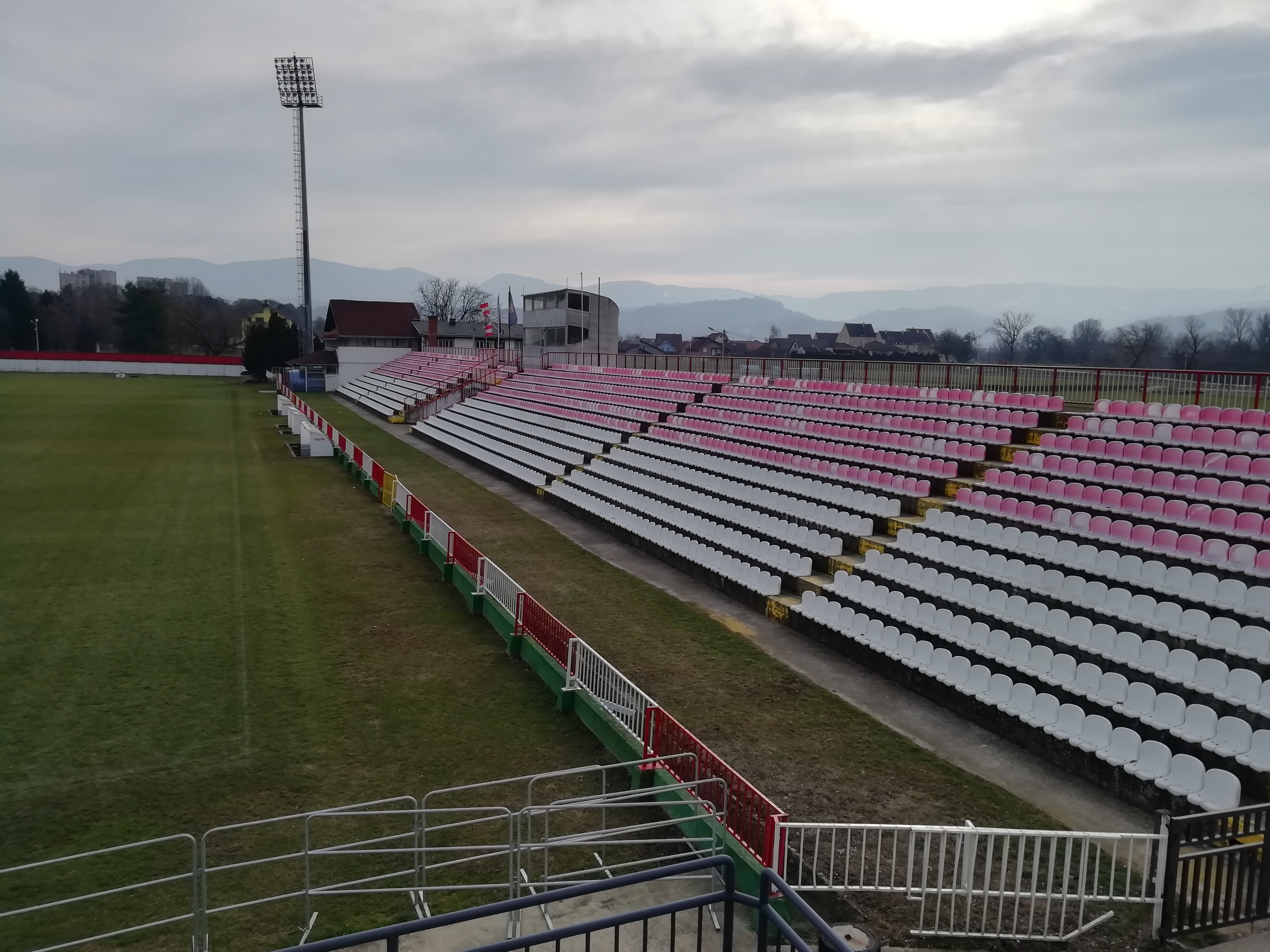
West Stand

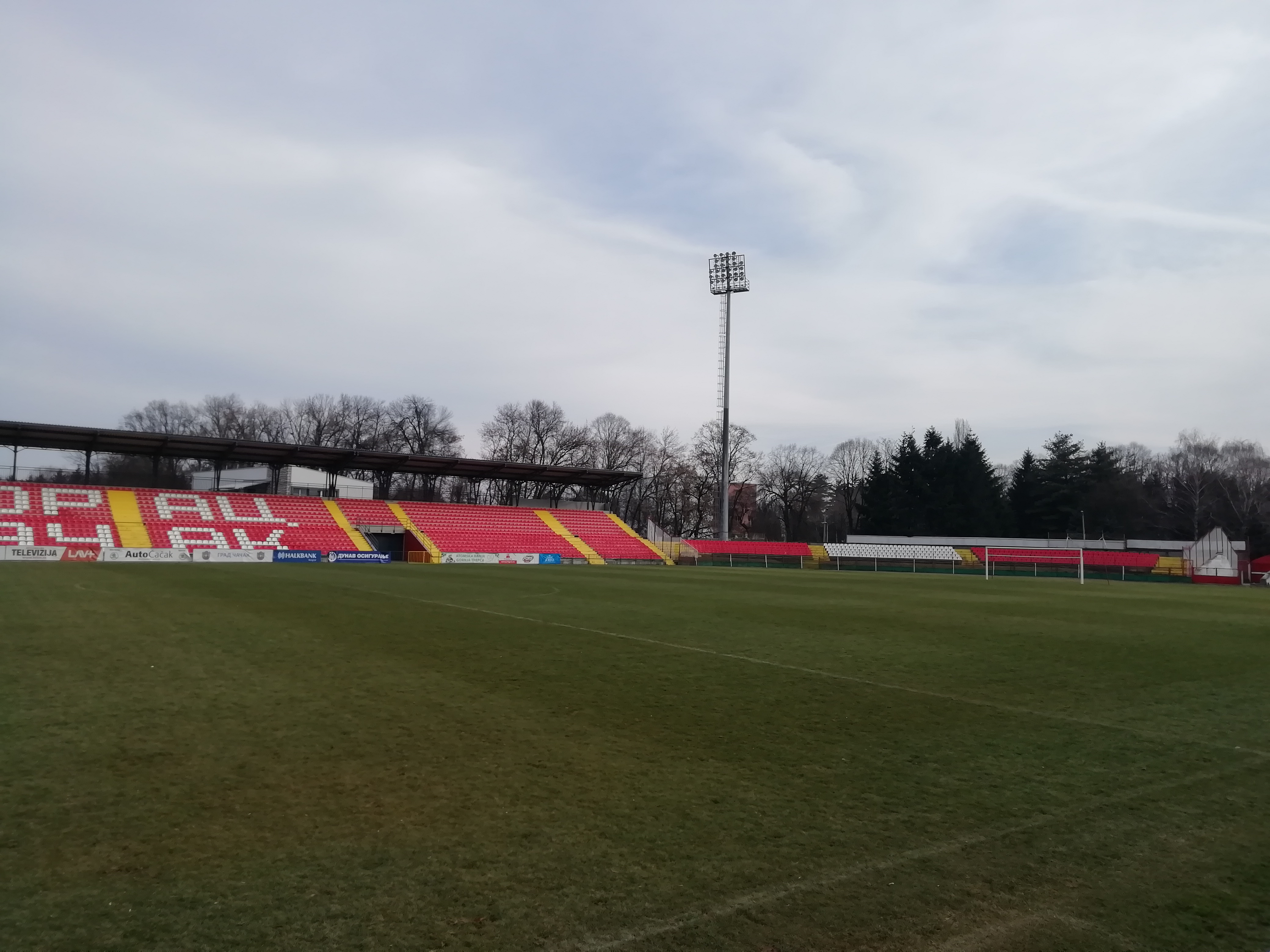
View on southeast corner

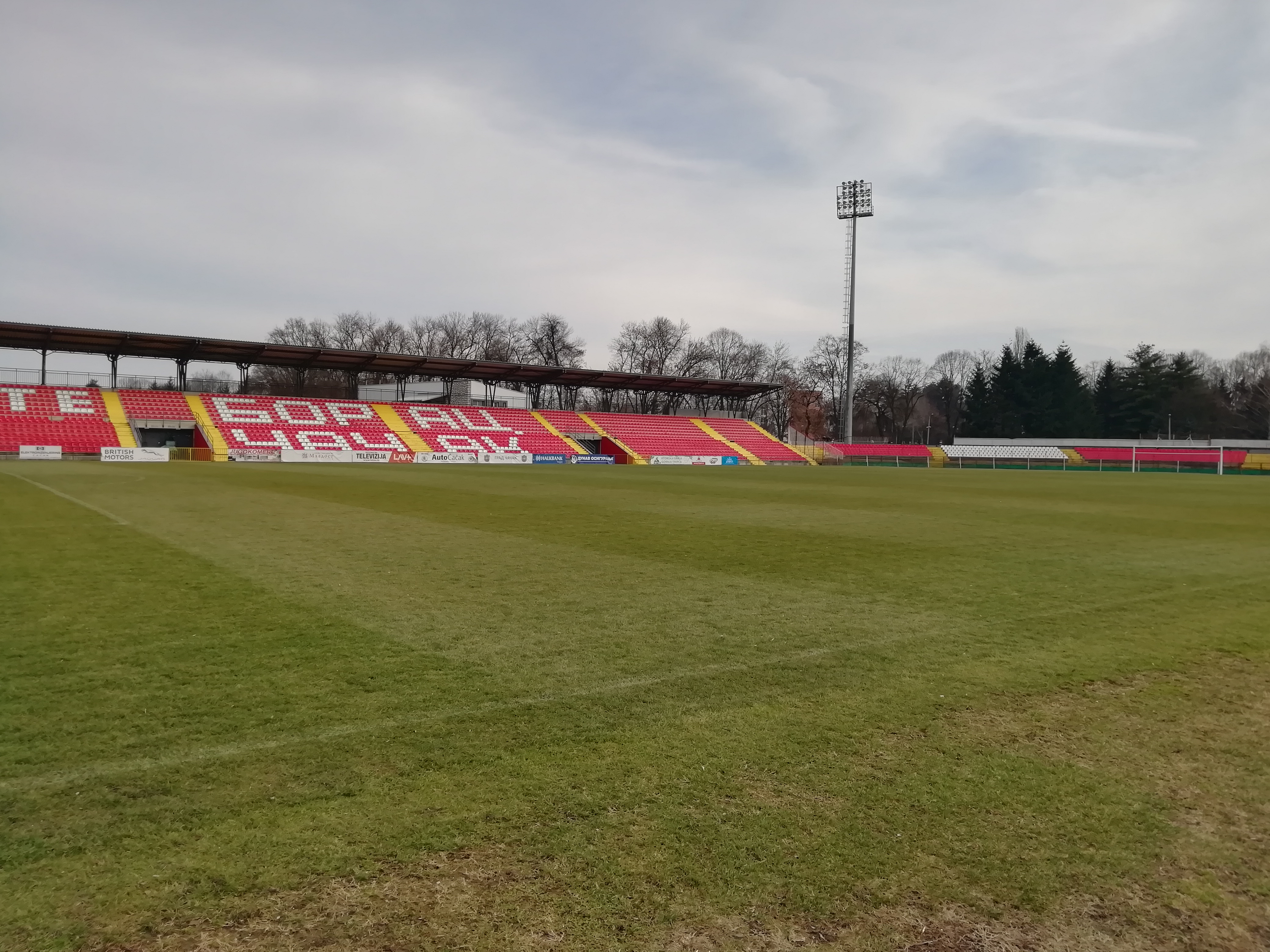
View on southeast corner

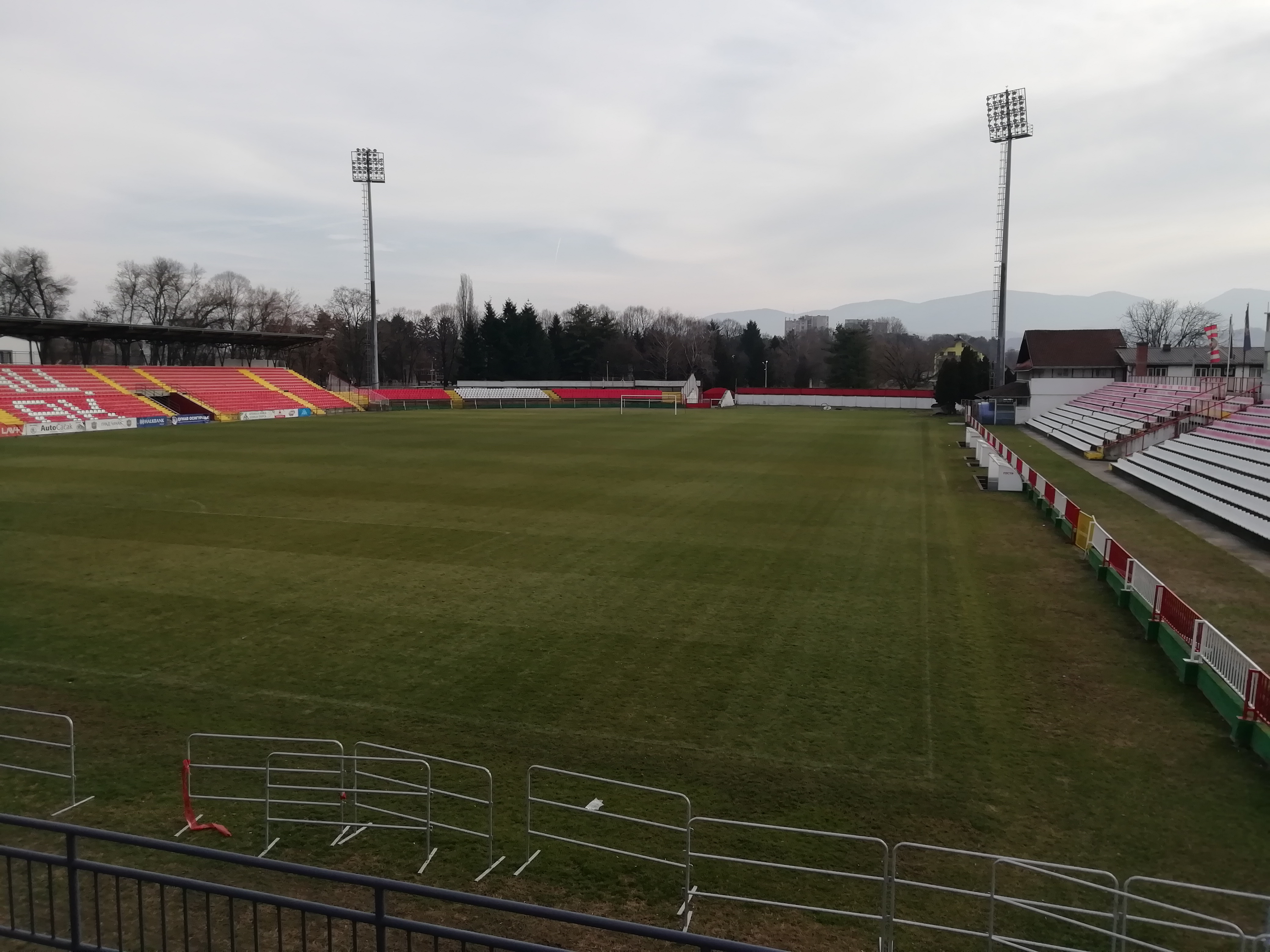
Football Field from North Stand

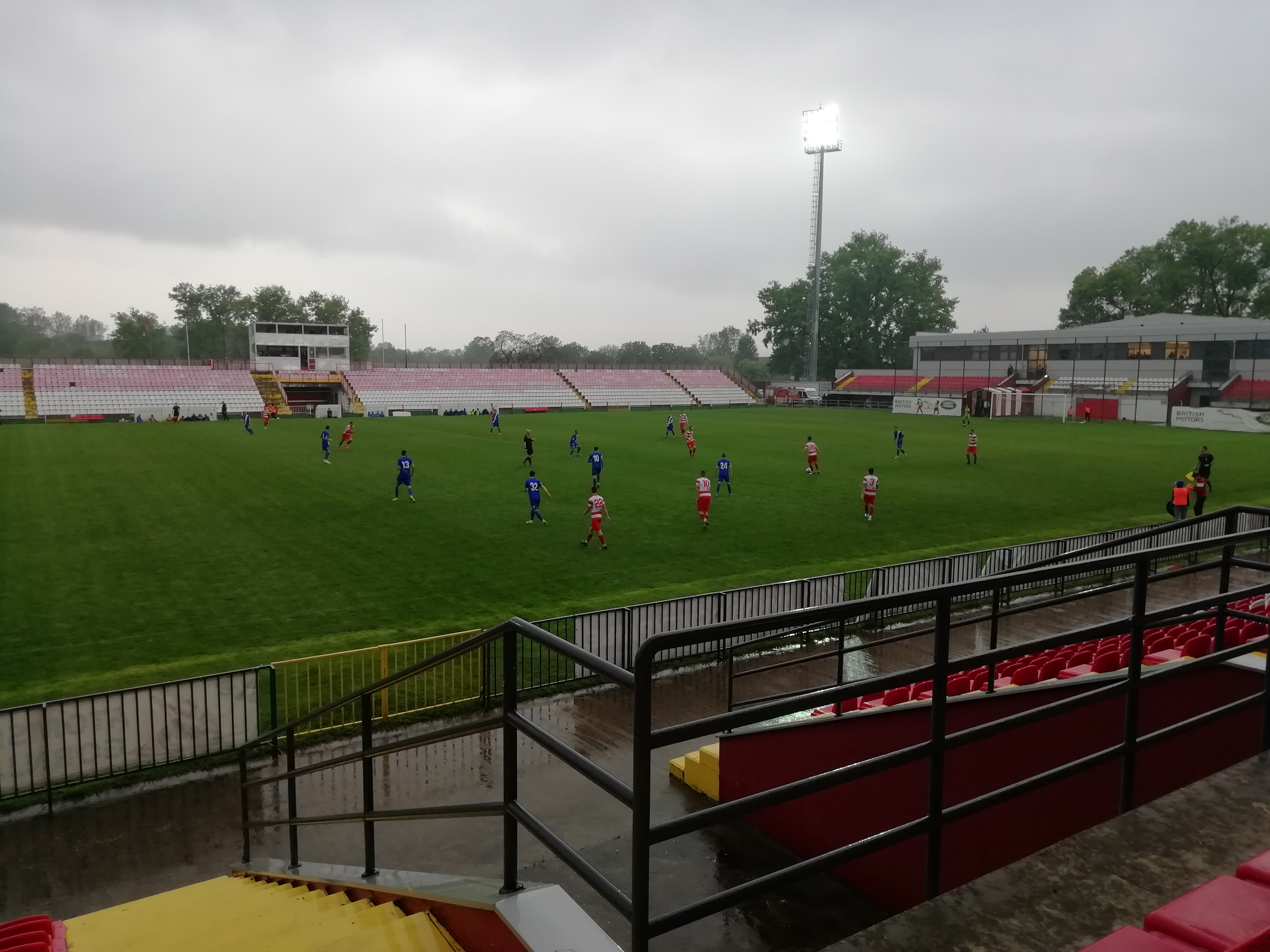
View on Football Field during game

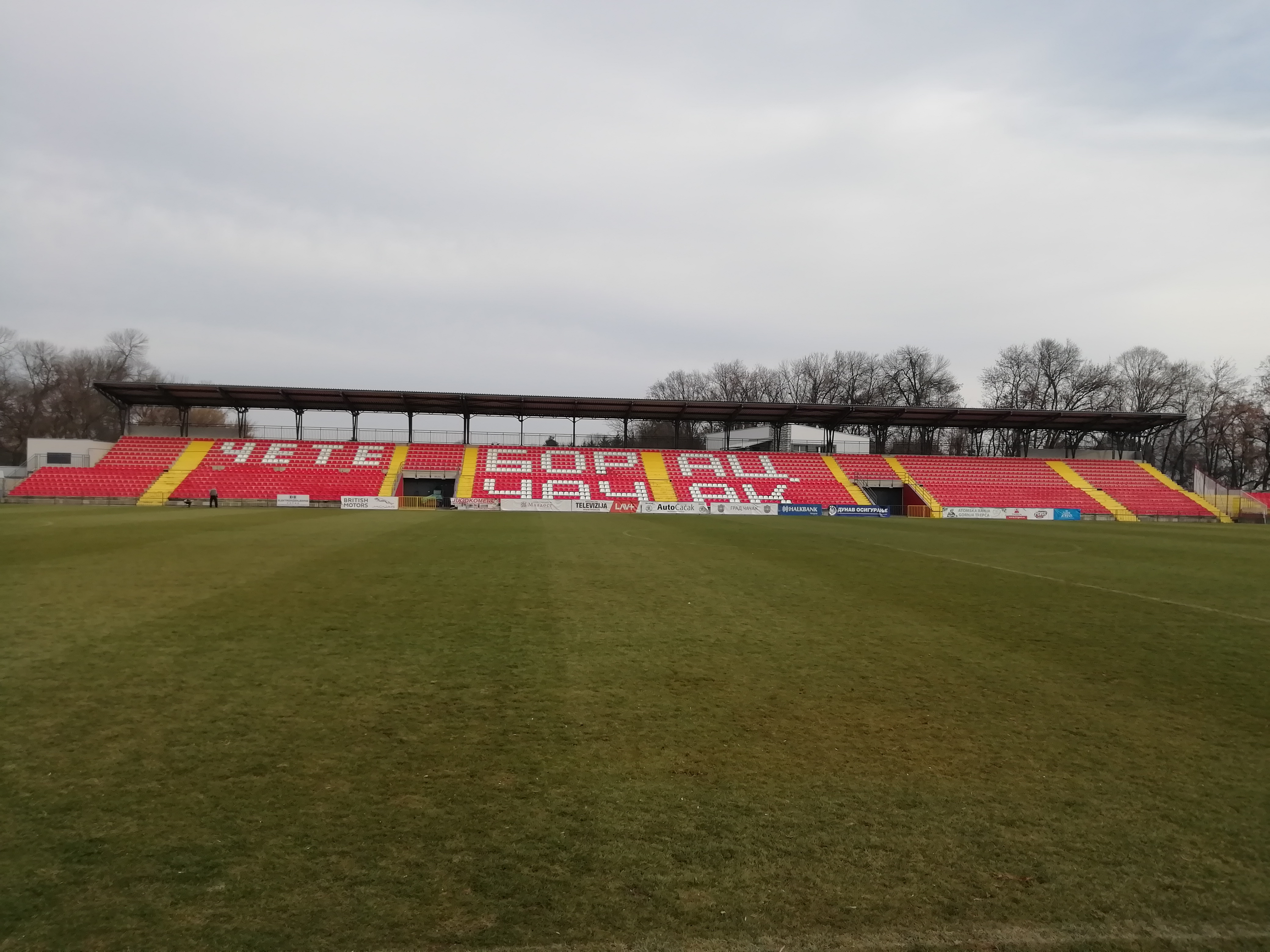
East Stand from Field

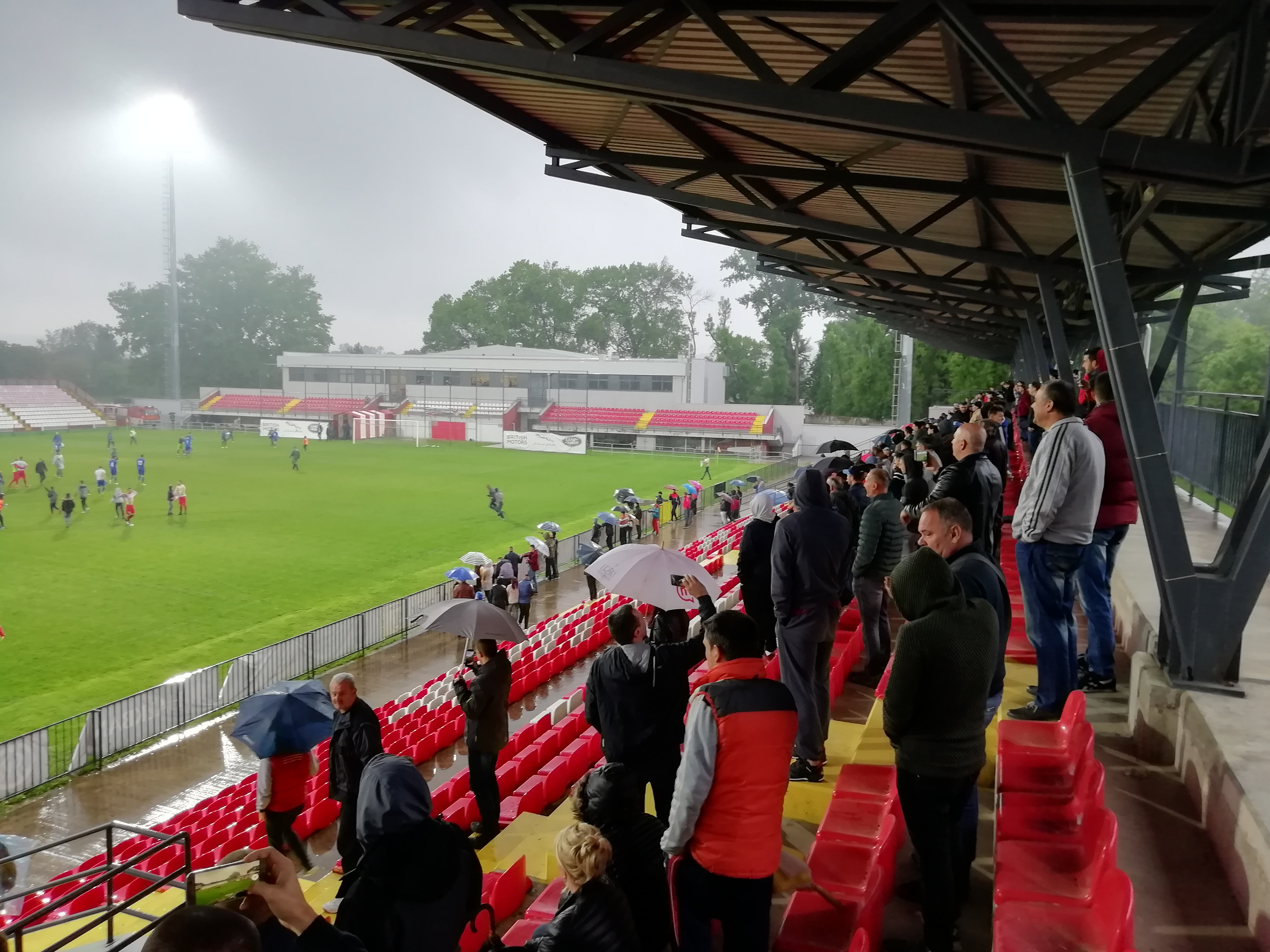
Close view of East Stand

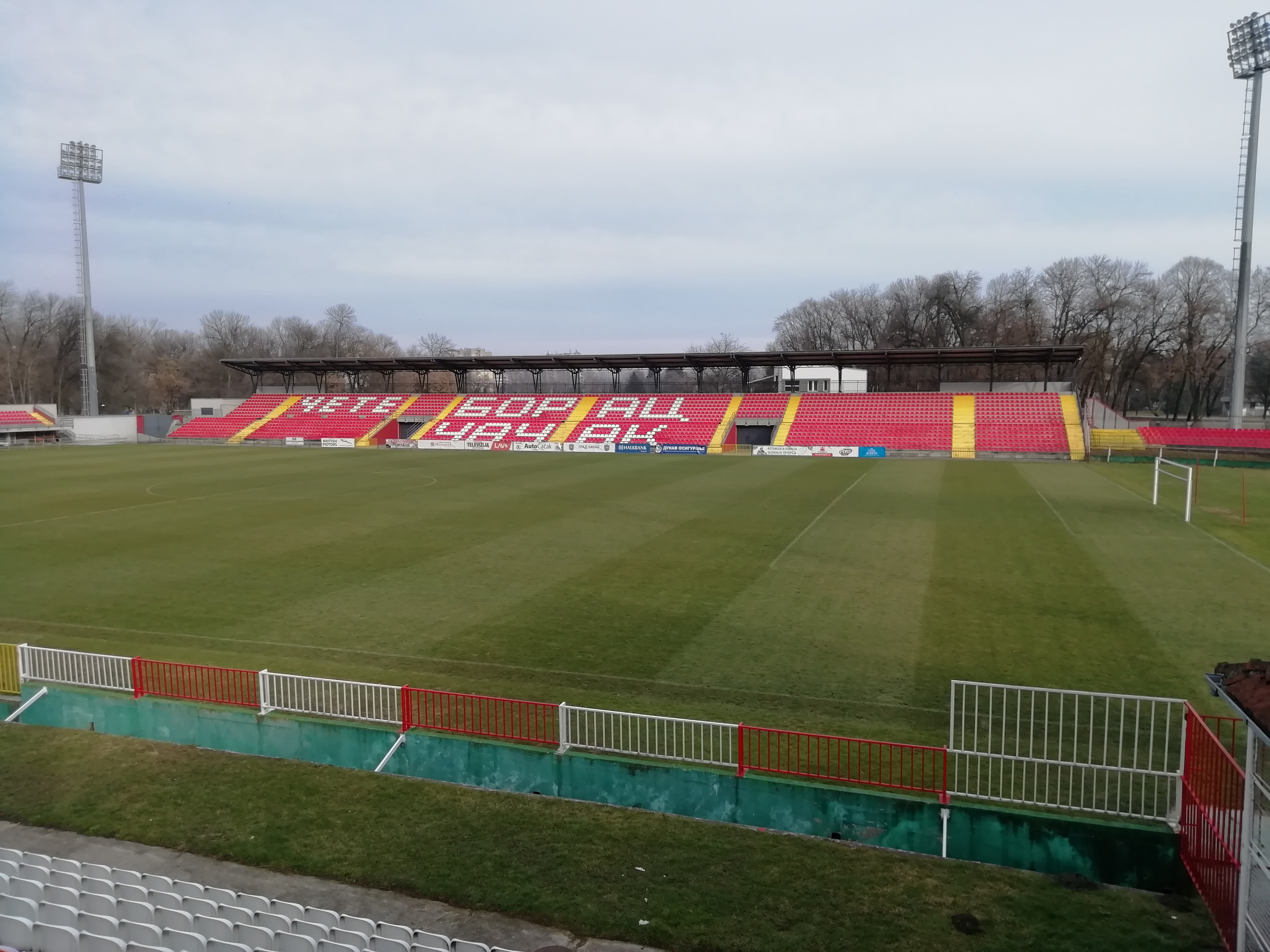
East Stand from West Stand

== See also ==
- List of football stadiums in Serbia
