= FK Resnik =

FK Resnik 1937
- Full name: Fudbalski Klub Resnik 1937
- Founded: 1937; 89 years ago as Pobeda
- Ground: Resnik, Resnik, Belgrade
- Capacity: 1,000
- Chairman: Nenad Popović
- League: Inter-municipal league Belgrade - group "B"
- 2024-25: Inter-municipal league Belgrade - group "B", 8th
Home colours	Away colours

FK Resnik 1937 (Serbian Cyrillic: ФК Ресник 1937) is a football club based in Belgrade, Serbia. It was founded in 1937 as Pobeda. The club most recently competed in the Inter-municipal league Belgrade, in the 6th tier of Serbian football.

From 2009 to 2011, they played in the 3rd-tier Serbian League Belgrade.

== Recent league history ==
Season	Division	P	W	D	L	F	A	Pts	Pos
2020–21	6 - Inter-municipal league Belgrade - group B	22	13	6	3	41	20	45	4th
2021–22	6 - Inter-municipal league Belgrade - group B	24	8	5	11	36	47	28 (Note: The club was docked one point.)	10th
2022–23	6 - Inter-municipal league Belgrade - group B	20	3	2	15	19	63	11	10th
2023–24	6 - Inter-municipal league Belgrade - group B	18	3	8	7	22	40	17	7th
2024–25	6 - Inter-municipal league Belgrade - group B	20	6	5	9	40	48	22 (Note: The club was docked one point.)	8th
