= Jovan Kastratović =

Serbian footballer

Personal information
- Full name: Jovan Kastratović
- Date of birth: 22 January 1993 (age 33)
- Place of birth: Kraljevo, FR Yugoslavia
- Height: 1.88 m (6 ft 2 in)
- Position: Striker

Team information
- Current team: Budućnost Konarevo

Youth career
- Junior Kraljevo
- 2007–2012: Borac Čačak

Senior career*
Years	Team	Apps	(Gls)
2011–2012	Borac Čačak	0	(0)
2012	→ Polet Ljubić (loan)	8	(1)
2013–2014	Zemun	30	(9)
2014–2015	Borac Banja Luka	0	(0)
2015	Legionovia Legionowo	5	(0)
2015	Aluminij	14	(1)
2016	Radnički Kovači	10	(6)
2017	Sileks	9	(2)
2017	Sloga Kraljevo	10	(9)
2018	Zlatibor Čajetina	12	(3)
2018	Sloga Kraljevo	3	(3)
2019	BSK Borča		
2019	Bačka Palanka	1	(0)
2019–2020	Zemun	9	(1)
2020–2021	Budućnost Konarevo		
2021	Karađorđe Ribnica		
2022–	Budućnost Konarevo		
- * Club domestic league appearances and goals as of 9 September 2018

Jovan Kastratović (Serbian Cyrillic: Јован Кастратовић; born 22 January 1993) is a Serbian footballer who plays as a forward for Budućnost Konarevo.

== Club career ==
Born in Kraljevo, Kastratović started playing football with local academy "Junior" and later passed Borac Čačak youth categories. He noted his first senior appearances as a loaned player with Serbian League West side Polet Ljubić, where he played 8 league matches and scored 1 goal. He moved to Zemun in the winter break off-season 2012–13. Kastratović affirmed himself as a forward playing with Zemun, and he scored 9 goals on 30 matches played in the Serbian League Belgrade. He was related to Rad at the beginning of 2014, but also stayed with Zemun until the end of 2013–14 season. In summer 2014, Kastratović joined Borac Banja Luka, but missed the beginning of season due to administrative problems. On 1 April 2015 he joined Legionovia Legionowo, where he made 6 appearances until the end of 2014–15 season. Later, during 2015, he also played with Aluminij, scoring once time on 14 matches in the Slovenian Second League. In summer 2016, Kastratović joined Radnički Kovači, where he played in the first half of the 2016–17 season in Morava Zone League and was the best team scorer. During the winter break off-season, he moved to Sileks. Kastratović scored his first goal for new club in 3–2 victory against Bregalnica Štip on 30 April 2017. In summer 2017, Kastratović joined Sloga Kraljevo. At the beginning of 2018, he moved to Zlatibor Čajetina. While with Zlatibor, Kastratović scored 3 goals on 12 matches in the Serbian League West, including the last one in the final fixture of the season, in 2–0 victory over Karađorđe Topola, after which Zlatibor promoted to the Serbian First League. Following the end of season, Kastratović left the club and returned to Sloga Kraljevo. After forming the new competition named Šumadija-Raška Zone, Kastratović scored in opening fixture match, against Šumadija Toponica, on 25 August 2018.

== Career statistics ==
As of 9 September 2018

Appearances and goals by club, season and competition
Club	Season	League			Cup		Continental		Other		Total	
Club	Season	Division	Apps	Goals	Apps	Goals	Apps	Goals	Apps	Goals	Apps	Goals
Borac Čačak	2011–12	Serbian SuperLiga	0	0	0	0	—		—		0	0
Borac Čačak	2012–13	Serbian First League	0	0	0	0	—		—		0	0
Borac Čačak	Total		0	0	0	0	—		—		0	0
Polet Ljubić (loan)	2012–13	Serbian League West	8	1	—		—		—		8	1
Zemun	2012–13	Serbian League Belgrade	7	4	—		—		—		7	4
Zemun	2013–14	Serbian League Belgrade	23	5	—		—		—		23	5
Zemun	Total		30	9	—		—		—		30	9
Borac Banja Luka	2014–15	Bosnian Premier League	0	0	0	0	—		—		0	0
Legionovia Legionowo	2014–15	II liga	6	0	—		—		—		6	0
Aluminij	2015–16	Slovenian Second League	14	1	0	0	—		—		14	1
Radnički Kovači	2016–17	Morava Zone League	10	6	—		—		1 (Note: Appearance in FSO Kraljevo Cup against Sloga)	1	11	7
Sileks	2016–17	Macedonian First League	9	—	—		—		9	2		
Zlatibor Čajetina	2017–18	Serbian League West	12	3	—		—		—		12	3
Sloga Kraljevo	2017–18	Morava Zone League	10	9	—		—		—		10	9
Sloga Kraljevo	2018–19	Šumadija-Raška Zone League	3	3	—		—		—		3	3
Sloga Kraljevo	Total		13	12	—		—		—		13	12
Career total			102	34	0	0	—		1	1	103	35

== Honours ==
Zlatibor Čajetina

- Serbian League West: 2017–18
