= Football in Serbia =

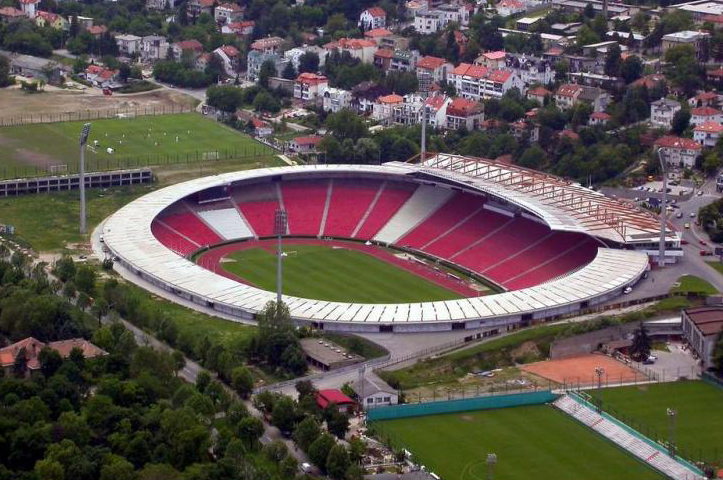
- Home stadium of club Red Star Belgrade
- Country: Serbia
- Governing body: Football Association of Serbia
- National team: Serbia national football team
- First played: 19 May 1896
- Registered players: 110,339
- Clubs: 3,087

National competitions
- FIFA World Cup; UEFA European Championship; UEFA Nations League

Club competitions
- League; Serbian SuperLiga; Serbian First League; Cups; Serbian Cup

International competitions
- FIFA Club World Cup; FIFA Intercontinental Cup; UEFA Champions League; UEFA Europa League; UEFA Conference League; UEFA Super Cup

Football is the most popular sport in Serbia. The Football Association of Serbia (FSS) is the national governing body and is responsible for overseeing all aspects of the game of football in the country, both professional and amateur. The association organizes the professional Serbian Superliga (top tier) and is responsible for appointing the management of the men's, women's, and youth national football teams in Serbia. The association also organizes the Serbian First League (second) and Serbian League (third), operating the top 3 leagues.

The FSS is also responsible for organizing the Serbian Cup, the country's league cup competition. It has been played from the end of the 19th century and there were a number of very successful Serbian football players and coaches throughout history.

One of Serbia's football clubs, Red Star Belgrade, has won the prestigious European Champions Cup in 1991 for Yugoslavia and has also won the Intercontinental Cup the same year. According to 2008 polls, Red Star Belgrade is the most popular football club in Serbia, with 48% of the population supporting them.

Its local rival, Partizan Belgrade, was the first Southeast and Eastern European football club to reach the European Champions Cup final, when it did so in 1966 under Yugoslavia. The most successful and popular teams are Red Star and Partizan from Belgrade as well as Vojvodina from Novi Sad. An important role also played OFK Belgrade and Radnički Niš in the history of the Serbian football

== History ==
=== Kingdom of Serbia and Austria-Hungary ===
Football arrived in the Kingdom of Serbia in the spring of 1896 when a Jewish student, Hugo Buli, after he had returned from his studies in Germany, brought the first football from Berlin to Belgrade. He brought the ball to his friends from the Belgrade gymnastics society Soko, and founded the first football section in Southeast Europe on 12 May. The first football match in Serbia took place on 19 May 1896 in Belgrade, between groups of local athletes and members of the Soko gymnastics society. Despite being reported in the press, the match attracted only about fifty spectators and generated little interest. The game attracted little interest and some hostility from spectators unfamiliar with the sport. Despite this, efforts to promote football continued, leading to the founding of Serbia’s first football club in 1899, the First Serbian Football Society.

The inaugural meeting of the First Serbian Football Society (Prvo srpsko društvo za igranje loptom) took place on 1 May 1899, at the restaurant Trgovačka kafana, at initiative of Hugo Buli, and with support of Andra Nikolić, who was then Minister of Foreign Affairs in the Kingdom of Serbia. Feti Bey, the Turkish consul in Belgrade, was elected as President, and the lawyer Mihailo Živadinović as the Vice-President. In spring 1899, the first football field was built in the Topčider neighbourhood of Belgrade, and the first match was played in May of that year between two teams of the members of the football society.

Most of the first Serbian football clubs were multi-sports societies which included football sections. The first football club was founded in Subotica in 1898, the Szabadkai Sport Egylet (Subotica Sports Society), among the then fans better known simply as "Sport", within which formed a football section in 1898 on the initiative of player and enthusiast Zoltán Wagner.

Another club was founded in Subotica on May 3, 1901, the Sports Athletic Club Bačka. More than two years later, on 14 September 1903, the football club Šumadija was founded in Kragujevac. The Subotica clubs were older, but at the time of the foundation of Sport and Bačka, the city of Subotica was part of the Austro-Hungarian Empire, while Kragujevac was on the territory of the then kingdom of Serbia. Being still active, Bačka is nowadays the oldest club in Serbia. Just following the foundation of Šumadija, Soko was founded in Belgrade, and thus became the first football club from the capital city. Since then several other clubs were formed such as Srpski mač in 1906, BSK in 1911 and SK Velika Srbija (later renamed to SK Jugoslavija) in 1913.

In spring 1914, the Serbian Olympic Committee organised the first ever trophy to be played among the best football clubs of the Kingdom of Serbia. It was played in a single-round robin system, and in the final held in Belgrade it was won by Velika Srbija. This seemed to be a promising start of an organised football tournament to be held regularly, however later that same year the Austro-Hungarian Empire declared war against Serbia in what would be the beginning of the First World War and the halt of all recreational and sports activities in Serbia.

=== Kingdom of Yugoslavia ===
At the end of the First World War the boundaries in the region were changed and the Serbian state was part of the Kingdom of Serbs, Croats and Slovenes, later in 1929 renamed into Kingdom of Yugoslavia. The Yugoslav Football Association (Jugoslovenski nogometni savez) was founded at a meeting in Zagreb, on 18 April 1919. The founding assembly was presided Danilo Stojanović, popularly known as Čika Dača, important because he was the founder of several football clubs such as Šumadija, BSK and others.

In 1919 the Belgrade Football Subassociation formed the first league tournament that started being held regularly since its inaugural season in 1919–20. The first Yugoslav state championship was launched in 1923. The championships were played until 1940, and in this period the best Serbian clubs won seven state championship titles: BSK five and SK Jugoslavija two. The interruption of the championship occurred due to disagreements between the sub-associations, which culminated in 1929 when the YFA Assembly was dissolved. The differences were resolved in February 1930, after three months of crisis. An extraordinary Assembly was convened, and it took place in Zagreb on 16 May 1930. It was voted that the association's headquarters be moved to the state capital, Belgrade, and that the name of the association would be changed into Yugoslav Football Association (Fudbalski savez Jugoslavije). BSK, along with HŠK Građanski, dominated the state scene until the beginning of World War II.

This period was marked by the mass popularization of football. The national league was dominated by clubs from Belgrade and Zagreb, but within Belgrade major rivalry was created between BSK and Jugoslavija (Reds and Blues respectively) creating what will be the Eternal derby of that period. The rivalry expanded throughout the country, more intensely in Serb populated areas but in others as well, dividing citizens between Reds and Blues. Best league players became real media stars, and some became real heartbreakers among the female population, as was Bane Sekulić.

The year of 1935 marked the professionalization of football in Yugoslavia, with the replacement of amateur status to the professional one, and the introduction of contracts for players.

On the assembly of the Yugoslav Football Association held on October 1, 1939, a decision was made to rename the FA into Serbian Football Association, after earlier that year the FA's of Croatia and Slovenia were formed, and the delegates of Ljubljana, Osijek, Split and Zagreb subassociations decided to abandon the Yugoslav Football Association.

=== Socialist Yugoslavia ===
The end of the war was the beginning of the reconstruction, and the devastated football grounds and stadiums, as well as the football clubs needed to be restored. On 25 February 1945, the football club Metalac was founded, later its name was changed into BSK, and then into OFK Beograd, as successor to the tradition of the pre-war Beogradski Sport Klub (BSK). The Red Star Belgrade was formed on 4 March 1945, and Partizan Belgrade on 4 October of the same year.

Some clubs were disbanded by the new socialist authorities, many on the ideological basis, for being considered too cosmopolitan and representative of the abolished monarchy, such as Jugoslavija or Jedinstvo Beograd, and some had simply disappeared due to man loss and long inactivity during the war. Some clubs were initially disbanded but shortly after, restored, the BASK case being the most evident, while a few top league clubs had continued their activity, as Vojvodina Novi Sad, RFK Novi Sad, Mačva Šabac and Radnički Kragujevac.

=== Contemporary period ===
After the dissolution of Yugoslavia, and the separation of Montenegro, on 26 June 2006, the Football Association of Serbia was admitted to the membership of FIFA and UEFA, as legal successor to all the previous national associations whose part it was. By this, the world and European federations have acknowledged the continuity of football in the territory of Serbia, and the decisive role of Serbia in creating the history of the game in Western Balkans since the end of the 19th century.

In recent years, many top Serbian players such as Dejan Stanković, Nemanja Vidić and Branislav Ivanović have gone on to forge successful careers in top European leagues. The U-21 team were runners-up at the 2007 UEFA Under-21 Championship having lost to the Netherlands in the final. As well, Serbia won the U-20 World Cup in 2015 in New Zealand.

== Competitions ==
The governing body of football in Serbia is the Football Association of Serbia. It oversees the organization of:

- Leagues:
  - Serbian SuperLiga — first league
  - Serbian First League — second league
  - Serbian League (4 groups) — third league
    - Serbian League Belgrade
    - Serbian League East
    - Serbian League Vojvodina
    - Serbian League West
  - Serbian Zone League (10 groups) — fourth league
    - Belgrade Zone League
    - Banat Zone League
    - Bačka Zone League
    - Novi Sad-Syrmia Zone League
    - Drina Zone League
    - Dunav Zone league
    - Morava Zone League
    - Zone League East
    - Zone League South
    - Zone League West
  - Serbian District League (31 leagues) — fifth league
  - Serbian Intermunicipal League (52 leagues) — sixth league
  - Serbian Municipal League (57 leagues) — seventh league
  - Serbian Municipal Second League (6 leagues) — eighth league
- Cup tournaments:
  - Serbian Cup
- National teams:
  - Serbia national football team
  - Serbia national under-21 football team
  - Serbia national under-19 football team
  - Serbia national under-17 football team

Note: the aforementioned competitions are for men if not stated differently. Women's football exists but is much less developed or popular.

== Teams ==
By far the two most popular clubs in the country are Partizan and Crvena zvezda, both from Belgrade.

== Player of the Year ==
The Serbian Footballer of the Year award is an annual award given from the Football Association of Serbia to the best player of the year.

== Football stadiums in Serbia ==
Stadiums with a capacity of 20,000 or higher are included.

Image	Stadium	Seating capacity	City	Home team	Notes
	Rajko Mitić Stadium	55,568	Belgrade	Crvena Zvezda	UEFA Category 4 stadium
	Partizan Stadium	29,775	Belgrade	Partizan Belgrade	UEFA Category 3 stadium

== Attendances ==
The average attendance per top-flight football league season and the club with the highest average attendance:

Season	League average	Best club	Best club average
2024–25	1,934	Crvena zvezda	10,719
2023–24	2,476	Crvena zvezda	15,761
2022–23	2,418	Crvena zvezda	12,697
2021–22	—	—	—
2020–21	—	—	—
2019–20	2,033	Crvena zvezda	10,577
2018–19	2,089	Crvena zvezda	12,958
2017–18	2,044	Crvena zvezda	11,836
2016–17	2,301	Crvena zvezda	10,552
2015–16	2,556	Crvena zvezda	16,983
2014–15	2,595	Crvena zvezda	12,152
2013–14	3,822	Crvena zvezda	20,018
2012–13	3,458	Crvena zvezda	16,221
2011–12	3,807	Crvena zvezda	19,783
2010–11	2,453	Crvena zvezda	13,250
2009–10	2,390	Crvena zvezda	10,352
2008–09	2,646	Crvena zvezda	6,500
2007–08	2,473	Partizan	6,556
2006–07	2,626	Crvena zvezda	9,138
2005–06	2,177	Crvena zvezda	7,000
2004–05	1,978	Crvena zvezda	4,533
2003–04	2,363	Crvena zvezda	8,033
2002–03	1,767	Crvena zvezda	3,629
2001–02	2,087	Crvena zvezda	4,594
2000–01	2,851	Crvena zvezda	7,400
1999–2000	2,182	Crvena zvezda	7,450
1998–99	2,466	Radnički	7,708
1997–98	2,216	Crvena zvezda	5,647
1996–97	2,736	Crvena zvezda	9,592
1995–96	3,467	Partizan	6,600
1994–95	5,044	Crvena zvezda	16,556
1993–94	3,290	Partizan	7,602
1992–93	2,684	Partizan	6,889

== Most successful clubs overall ==
As of 24 May 2026

Club	Domestic Titles					International Titles					Overall titles
Club	League	Cup	League Cup	Super Cup	Total	Intercontinental Cup	UEFA Champions League	Mitropa Cup	Balkans Cup	Total	Overall titles
Crvena zvezda	37	30	1	2	70	1	1	2	-	4	74
Partizan	27	16	-	1	44	-	-	1	-	1	45
Beograd	5	5	-	-	10	-	-	-	-	-	10
Vojvodina	2	2	-	-	4	-	-	1	-	1	5
Jugoslavija	2	3	-	-	5	-	-	-	-	-	5
Radnički Niš	-	-	-	-	0	-	-	-	1	1	1
Obilić	1	-	-	-	1	-	-	-	-	-	1
Čukarički	-	1	-	-	1	-	-	-	-	-	1
Jagodina	-	1	-	-	1	-	-	-	-	-	1
Smederevo	-	1	-	-	1	-	-	-	-	-	1
Železnik	-	1	-	-	1	-	-	-	-	-	1
SAND	-	1	-	-	1	-	-	-	-	-	1

== Sources ==
- Sijić, Milorad (2014). Fudbal u Kraljevini Jugoslaviji [Football in the Kingdom of Yugoslavia] (in Serbian) (Second ed.). Župe Local History Museum. ISBN 978-86-86829-06-1.
- Zec, Dejan (2010). "The Origin of Soccer in Serbia". Journal of the North American Society for Serbian Studies. Slavica Publishers. doi:10.1353/ser.2012.0014.
