= 2012–13 Serbian League West =

Serbian League West
- Season: 2012–13

Serbian League West is a section of the Serbian League, Serbia's third football league. Teams from the western part of Serbia are in this section of the league. The other sections are Serbian League East, Serbian League Vojvodina, and Serbian League Belgrade. In the 2012-13 season 1st placed team gains promotion to the Serbian First League and the last two team get relegated the Zone League.

Location of teams in the 2012–13 Serbian League West

== Teams ==
- GFK Jasenica 1911
- FK Bane
- FK Krušik Valjevo
- FK Mačva Šabac
- FK Mladi Radnik
- FK Pobeda Beloševac
- FK Polet Ljubić
- FK Partizan Bumbarevo Brdo
- FK Radnički Stobex
- FK Rudar Kostolac
- FK Seljak Mihajlovac
- FK Sloboda Čačak
- Sloga Petrovac
- FK Šumadija Aranđelovac
- FK Vujić Voda
- FK Železničar Lajkovac

== League table ==
Pos	Team	Pld	W	D	L	GF	GA	GD	Pts	Promotion or relegation
1	Sloga Petrovac (C, P)	30	22	3	5	54	24	+30	69	Promotion to Serbian First League
2	Mladi Radnik Požarevac	30	17	9	4	39	17	+22	60	
3	Mačva Šabac	30	16	9	5	44	22	+22	57	
4	Polet Ljubić	30	13	10	7	40	27	+13	49	
5	Šumadija Aranđelovac	30	10	9	11	30	29	+1	39	
6	Rudar Kostolac	30	8	14	8	33	35	−2	38	
7	Seljak Mihajlovac	30	9	11	10	45	52	−7	38	
8	Železničar Lajkovac	30	9	10	11	26	32	−6	37	
9	Pobeda Beloševac	30	8	13	9	29	39	−10	37	
10	Bane Raška	30	10	6	14	27	42	−15	36	
11	Jasenica 1911	30	9	8	13	32	29	+3	35	
12	Sloboda Čačak	30	8	11	11	33	36	−3	35	
13	Krušik Valjevo	30	9	6	15	25	34	−9	33	
14	Partizan Bumbarevo Brdo	30	8	8	14	35	38	−3	32	
15	Radnički Stobex (R)	30	9	4	17	24	36	−12	31	Relegation to Zone League
16	Vujić Valjevo (R)	30	5	9	16	27	51	−24	24	Relegation to Zone League

Source: srbijasport.net
Rules for classification: 1) points; 2) head-to-head points; 3) head-to-head goal difference; 4) head-to-head goals scored; 5) goal difference; 6) number of goals scored.
(C) Champions; (P) Promoted; (R) Relegated
