= FK Trepča =

Kosovo football club

Trepča
- Full name: Fudbalski Klub Trepča
- Nicknames: Rudari (The Miners); Trepčani (Members of Trepča)
- Founded: 25 May 1989; 37 years ago (current form); 2010, merged with Partizan Kosovska Mitrovica to Rudar Kosovska Mitrovica
- Ground: Zvečan Stadium (formerly)
- Capacity: 1,400
- Chairman: Bratislav Radibratović
- Manager: Zoran Drobac
- 2024–25: Morava Zone League, 14th
Home colours	Away colours

Fudbalski klub Trepča (Serbian Cyrillic: Фудбалски клуб Трепча), commonly known as Trepča or Rudar, is a Serbian football club based in North Mitrovica, in Kosovo. Despite being located in Kosovo, the club most recently played in the Serbian football league system, in the fourth tier Morava Zone League.

FK Trepča and Albanian KF Trepça both claim the heritage of the successful club in Yugoslavia. However, KF Trepça is recognized as the successor by the Football Federation of Kosovo and FK Trepča is considered to be operating illegally, while Serbian Football Association backs FK Trepča's claim. In 2010, the Serbian FK Trepča merged with the local Serbian club FK Partizan Kosovska Mitrovica and integrated with it.

== Name ==
The club was named after the former Trepça Mines, which are located north-east of Mitrovicë. It was first known as FK Rudar Kosovska Mitrovica until 1962 when it was named FK Trepča.

== History ==
On the 25 May 1989, the multiethnic club Trepca converted into two clubs, which both claimed heritage of the successes in the Yugoslavian era, because Albanian players were forced to leave after the start of the cultural oppression of the ethnic Albanian population. The Albanian KF Trepça started competing in the Independent League of Kosovo and FK Trepča stayed in the Serbian League system with other phantom clubs like FK Priština, FK Kosovo Polje and Budućnost Peć. Thus there were two clubs in the city with virtually the same name.

In the season 2001–02 they finished bottom of the Serbian League Morava and were relegated. In the season 2003–04 they played in the 1/16 finals of the Serbia and Montenegro Cup. In the season 2004–05 FK Trepča was playing in the Serbian fourth level, Šumadijska zona, and finished 15th. They played their matches in Zubin Potok. In the season 2006–07 they played again in the Šumadija zone finishing 10th. In 2007, a basketball section of the club was founded with the name KK Trepča.

FK Trepča reached the pre-eliminary round of the 2011–12 Serbian Cup. They played it after winning the Kosovo and Metohija qualifying group.

In April 2013, Trepča attended a friendly match against the Serbian top-level club Partizan in Belgrade, which symbolized the solidarity with Serbs from Kosovo, which Trepča narrowly lost with 2–3. Both goals for Trepča were scored by Perica Ilić. A year later, they also played a friendly match with same character against the other Serbian top club Red Star Belgrade, which they lost by 0–3.

=== Recent league history ===
Season	Division	P	W	D	L	F	A	Pts	Pos
2020–21	3 - Serbian League West	34	14	13	7	44	28	55	5th
2021–22	3 - Serbian League West	30	3	6	21	18	54	15	16th
2022–23	4 - Šumadija-Raška Zone League	26	9	9	8	40	37	36	6th
2023–24	4 - Šumadija-Raška Zone League	25	11	5	9	40	40	38	4th
2024–25	4 - Morava Zone League	26	4	5	17	17	63	17	14th

== Stadium ==
From 1990 to this date, the club do not have its own venue.

After the war in 1999, the city was divided into a southern part with almost exclusively Kosovo Albanian and a northern part with non-Albanian or predominantly Serb population.

The Trepča Stadium is located in the southern part of the city, thus the FK Trepča is not possible to play its home matches in the stadium. Currently, only Albanian teams play in Trepča Stadium. The Trepča Stadium is officially known now as Stadiumi Olimpik Adem Jashari, after Adem Jashari, a former leader of the Albanian military organisation UÇK, but the Serbian population still calls it Stadion Trepča. Because of these current difficult political situation, Trepča plays its home games near Zvečan, in 3.500 seater Zvečan Stadium.

Since 2023, Trepča does not play anymore in North Kosovo but in Raška or Novi Pazar which was accepted by Zoran Gajić, the Serbian minister of sports.

== Club colors ==
The club colors are green and black, which are also included in the coat of arms of the city, and were also the colors prior to the merger and the integration of Partizan Kosovska Mitrovica. To the club color of Partizan Belgrade belonged also red and blue. Thus, the away kit of Partizan Kosovska Mitrovica wore these colors were symbolic the main colors of the Serbian flag. It was similar at Partizan Belgrade.

== Honours ==
- First League of North Kosovo
  - Champions (3): 2002–03, 2005–06, 2008–09
- Kosovo and Metohija Cup
  - Champions (5): 1992, 2003, 2011, 2012, 2014
