= West Morava Zone League =

Serbian fourth tier football league

- Founded: 2018
- Folded: 2024
- Country: Serbia
- Number of clubs: 12
- Level on pyramid: 4
- Promotion to: Serbian League West
- Relegation to: Moravica District League; Zlatibor District League
- Domestic cup: Serbian Cup
- Last champions: Jedinstvo Putevi (2023–24)

West Morava Zone League (Serbian: Зонска лига Западно-моравска / Zonska liga Zapadno-moravska) was one of the Serbian Zone League divisions, the fourth tier of the Serbian football league system. It was run by the Football Association of West Serbia.

The league was founded in 2018, together with the Kolubara-Mačva Zone League, Šumadija-Raška Zone League and Podunavlje-Šumadija Zone League. In 2024, these four leagues folded and the 3 old Zone Leagues were re-established: the Morava Zone League, Dunav Zone League and Drina Zone Leagues.

== Seasons ==
Season	Winner	Runner-up
2018–19	Takovo	Budućnost Arilje
2019–20	Canceled due to the COVID-19 pandemic	
2020–21	Sloga Bajina Bašta	Jedinstvo Putevi
2021–22	Polet	Sloboda Čačak
2022–23	Omladinac	Jedinstvo Putevi
2023–24	Jedinstvo Putevi	Polimlje
