= Nenad Sević =

Serbian footballer

Personal information
- Date of birth: 25 April 1996 (age 30)
- Place of birth: Ljubovija, FR Yugoslavia
- Height: 1.82 m (6 ft 0 in)
- Positions: Left-back; left midfielder

Team information
- Current team: OFK Mladenovac

Senior career*
Years	Team	Apps	(Gls)
2013–2014	Drina Ljubovija		
2014–2015	Loznica	13	(0)
2015–2016	Budućnost Krušik	24	(2)
2016–2021	Javor Ivanjica	109	(3)
2016	→ Kolubara (loan)	0	(0)
2021	Zlatibor Čajetina	17	(2)
2021–2022	Mladost Novi Sad	10	(0)
2022	Jedinstvo Ub		
2023	Smederevo		
2023	FAP Priboj		
2024	Zvezdara		
2024	Zlatibor Čajetina		
2025-	OFK Mladenovac		
- * Club domestic league appearances and goals as of 6 October 2021

Nenad Sević (Serbian Cyrillic: Ненад Севић; born 25 April 1996) is a Serbian footballer who plays for OFK Mladenovac.

== Career ==
=== Early career ===
Born in Ljubovija, Sević started playing senior football with local club Drina. Playing for that club, he scored a spectacular goal from corner kick during the league cup match against Rađevac. Later he played as a bonus player for Loznica where he made some assists, and Budućnost Krušik in the Serbian League West, where he scored 2 goals on 24 matches for the 2015–16 season.

=== Javor Ivanjica ===
In summer 2016, Sević moved to Javor Ivanjica and signed a three-year contract with the club. He made his debut for new club in the first fixture of the 2016–17 season against Radnik Surdulica, played on 23 July 2016. Sević was also loaned to Kolubara for the 2016–17 Serbian First League season, on dual registration. Sević scored his first goal for Javor and was also nominated for the man of the match against Proleter Novi Sad in the first round of Serbian Cup, played on 21 September 2016.

== Career statistics ==
As of 10 December 2016

Club	Season	League			Cup		Continental		Other		Total	
Club	Season	Division	Apps	Goals	Apps	Goals	Apps	Goals	Apps	Goals	Apps	Goals
Loznica	2014–15	Serbian League West	13	0	–	–	–	–	2 (Note: Appearance in Western Serbia Cup)	0	15	0
Budućnost Krušik	2015–16	Serbian League West	24	2	–	–	–	–	–	–	24	2
Javor Ivanjica	2016–17	Serbian SuperLiga	18	0	2	1	–	–	–	–	20	1
Kolubara (loan)	2016–17	Serbian First League	0	0	0	0	–	–	–	–	0	0
Career total			55	2	2	1	0	0	2	0	59	3

== Honours ==
Loznica

- Serbian League West: 2014–15
