= Aleksandar Radovanović =

Serbian footballer (born 1993)

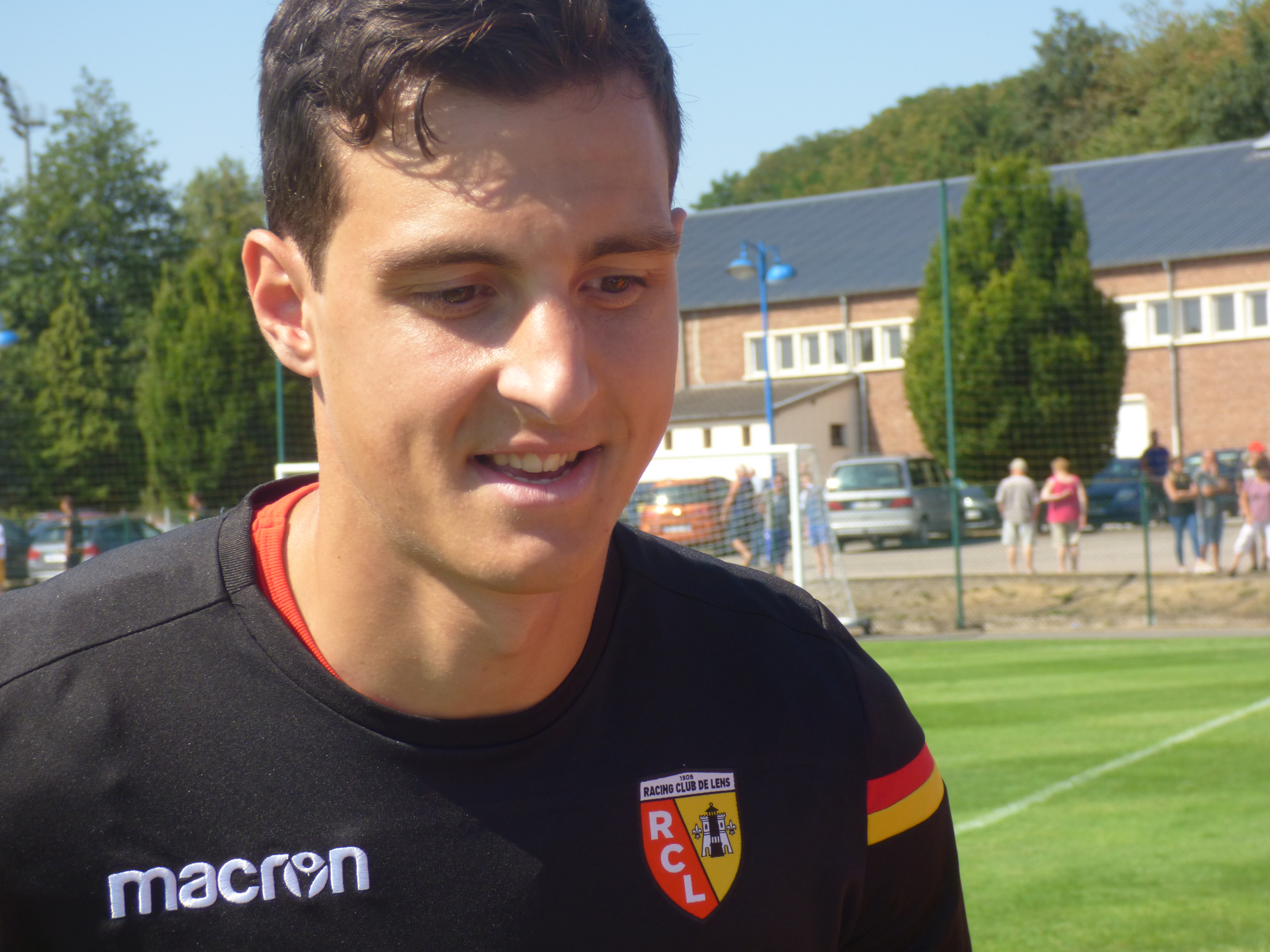
- Radovanović with Lens in 2018

Personal information
- Date of birth: 11 November 1993 (age 33)
- Place of birth: Šabac, FR Yugoslavia
- Height: 1.89 m (6 ft 2 in)
- Position: Centre-back

Youth career
- Mačva Šabac

Senior career*
Years	Team	Apps	(Gls)
2010–2015	Mačva Šabac	65	(3)
2015–2016	OFK Beograd	15	(0)
2016–2018	Spartak Subotica	45	(5)
2018	Vojvodina	11	(1)
2018–2021	Lens	33	(2)
2019	Lens II	1	(0)
2021–2024	Kortrijk	44	(0)
2023	→ Austin (loan)	7	(0)
2024–2025	Almería	27	(0)
2025–2026	Zaragoza	23	(0)
- * Club domestic league appearances and goals as of 31 May 2026

Aleksandar Radovanović (Serbian Cyrillic: Александар Радовановић; born 11 November 1993) is a Serbian professional footballer who plays as a centre-back.

== Career ==
=== Mačva Šabac ===
Born in Šabac, Radovanović started his career with local club Mačva, where he passed youth categories. He joined the first team of the club in the 2010–11, making 6 appearances in the Serbian League West. During the next season, Radovanović made 23 league appearances as a bonus player, and also scored his first senior goal for Mačva. After he overgrown youth selection, Radovanović continued playing with the first team, and during the 2012–13 Serbian League West season he was used four times on the field. As in each of two previous seasons, Radovanović also scored once in the 2013–14 season, during the 7 fixture match against Rudar Kostolac. After the club promoted in the Serbian First League in summer 2014, Radovanović started new season as a first choice centre-back, but missed some matches due to injury he earned in the 12 fixture match against Kolubara. He collected 23 league matches until the end of 2014–15 season. In summer 2015, he left the club.

=== OFK Beograd ===
In summer 2015, Radovanović joined Serbian SuperLiga side OFK Beograd, but missed the beginning of the 2015–16 season, due to administrative problems. He made his professional contract for OFK Beograd under coach Dragoljub Bekvalac in 16 fixture match of the season, against Red Star Belgrade. During the season, Radovanović made 15 league appearances at total, making an assist to Vuk Martinović in the 27 fixture match for 1–0 victory against Vojvodina.

=== Spartak Subotica ===
After he passed a trial period, playing pre-season matches with Spartak Subotica, Radovanović officially joined the club in July 2016 on a three-year contract. He made his debut for new club as a centre-back in opening match of the 2016–17 Serbian SuperLiga season against Voždovac, paired with Nemanja Ćalasan. Radovanović scored his first SuperLiga goal matchday 8 of the same season against Javor Ivanjica, played on 10 September 2016. In his first season with Spartak, Radovanović collected 31 appearances with one goal in all competitions at total under coach Andrey Chernyshov. Radovanović scored his second SuperLiga goal for Spartak in four fixture match of the 2017–18 season, against Javor Ivanjica. Radovanović also scored a twice in 4–2 victory over Radnički Niš. Radovanović realised penalty kick in a match against Borac Čačak on 19 November 2017, which was his fourth goal in the season.

=== Vojvodina ===
On 22 January 2018, Radovanović signed a two-year deal with Vojvodina. He officially promoted in new club by sporting director Saša Drakulić, choosing to wear number 66 jersey, previously ordered to Joseph Bempah, which he also wore in the previous club. Radovanović made his competitive debut for new club under coach Ilija Stolica in 2–0 victory over Voždovac on 17 February 2018. Radovanović collected 11 SuperLiga matches for Vojvodina until the end of season, scoring a single goal in 2–1 victory over Partizan on 29 April 2018.

=== Lens ===
On 26 June 2018, Radovanović signed a four-year deal with Lens, and the transfer fee was unofficially reported as €750,000. He has given number 26 jersey in new club.

=== Almería ===
On 20 January 2024, Radovanović joined Almería in Spain on a 1.5-year contract. On 24 June of the following year, he renewed his contract for one further season, but terminated his link one month later.

=== Zaragoza ===
Hours after leaving Almería, Radovanović was announced at fellow Segunda División side Zaragoza on a two-year deal.

== Career statistics ==
As of 24 June 2023

Appearances and goals by club, season and competition
Club	Season	League			National cup (Note: Includes appearance(s) in Coupe de France, Belgian Cup, and U.S. Open Cup)		League cup		Continental		Other		Total	
Club	Season	Division	Apps	Goals	Apps	Goals	Apps	Goals	Apps	Goals	Apps	Goals	Apps	Goals
Mačva Šabac	2010–11	League West	6	0	—		—		—		—		6	0
Mačva Šabac	2011–12	League West	23	1	—		—		—		—		23	1
Mačva Šabac	2012–13	League West	4	1	—		—		—		—		4	1
Mačva Šabac	2013–14	League West	9	1	—		—		—		—		9	1
Mačva Šabac	2014–15	First League	23	0	—		—		—		—		23	0
Mačva Šabac	Total		65	3	—		—		—		—		65	3
OFK Beograd	2015–16	Serbian Superliga	15	0	0	0	—		—		—		15	0
Spartak Subotica	2016–17	Serbian Superliga	30	1	1	0	—		—		—		31	1
Spartak Subotica	2017–18	Serbian Superliga	15	4	1	0	—		—		—		16	4
Spartak Subotica	Total		45	5	2	0	—		—		—		47	5
Vojvodina	2017–18	Serbian Superliga	11	1	0	0	—		—		—		11	1
Lens	2018–19	Ligue 2	16	0	1	0	0	0	—		—		17	0
Lens	2019–20	Ligue 2	16	2	2	0	0	0	—		1 (Note: Includes appearance in Coupe de la Ligue)	0	19	2
Lens	2020–21	Ligue 2	1	0	0	0	0	0	—		—		1	0
Lens	Total		33	2	3	0	0	0	—		1	0	37	2
Lens II	2019-20	Championnat National 2	1	0	0	0	0	0	—		—		1	0
Kortrijk	2020–21	Belgian Pro League	7	0	2	0	0	0	—		—		9	0
Kortrijk	2021–22	Belgian Pro League	26	0	1	0	0	0	—		—		27	0
Kortrijk	2022–23	Belgian Pro League	11	0	1	0	0	0	—		—		12	0
Kortrijk	Total		44	0	4	0	0	0	—		—		48	0
Austin FC	2022–23	Major League Soccer	7	0	2	0	0	0	0	0	0	0	9	0
Career total			206	11	11	0	0	0	0	0	1	0	218	11

== Honours ==
Mačva Šabac

- Serbian League West: 2013–14
