= Aleksandar Stanisavljević =

Serbian footballer

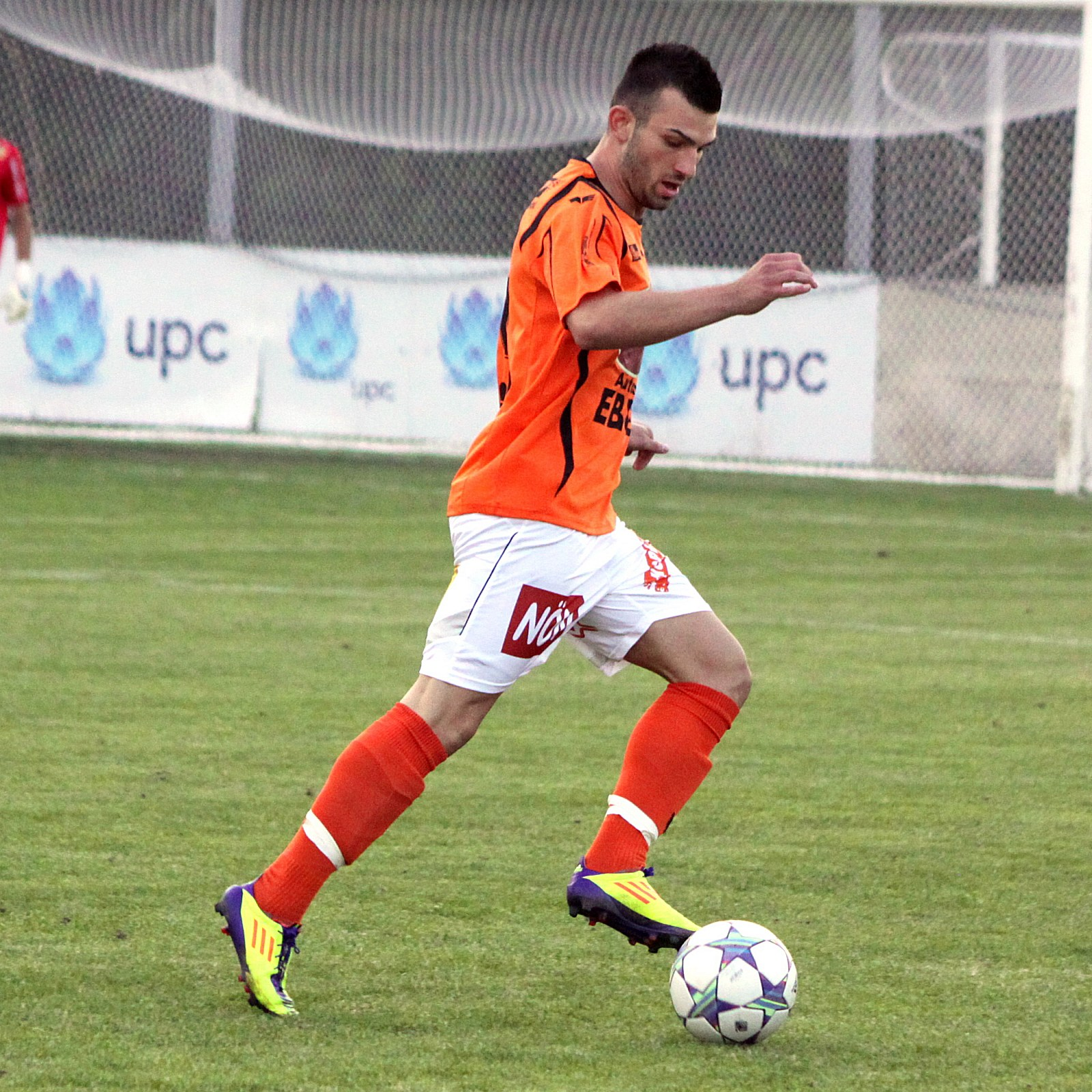

Personal information
- Full name: Aleksandar Stanisavljević
- Date of birth: 11 June 1989 (age 37)
- Place of birth: Požarevac, SFR Yugoslavia
- Height: 1.81 m (5 ft 11 1/2 in)
- Position: Winger

Youth career
- 2000–2002: FC Braunau
- 2002–2007: AKA OÖ West

Senior career*
Years	Team	Apps	(Gls)
2007–2008	Ried	0	(0)
2008–2009	SK St. Andrä	11	(1)
2009–2010	Horn	20	(6)
2010–2011	Ostbahn XI	14	(4)
2011	First Vienna	9	(1)
2011	Zalaegerszeg	3	(0)
2012	1. SC Sollenau	10	(0)
2013	Vorwärts Steyr	8	(1)
2013	Sloga Petrovac	13	(5)
2014	OFK Beograd	7	(0)
2014–2015	Donji Srem	20	(5)
2015	Vojvodina	19	(6)
2016–2017	Asteras Tripolis	26	(3)
2018	Radnički Niš	31	(9)
2019	Bnei Sakhnin	6	(0)
2019	Voždovac	14	(2)
2020	Caspiy	1	(1)
2020	Kaisar	17	(0)
2021	Voždovac	34	(3)
2022	Qizilqum	24	(6)
2023	Buxoro	24	(2)
2024	Novi Sad 1921	11	(0)
2024–2025	Mladi Radnik 1926		
2025–2026	Kabel	14	(0)
2026–	Šumadija Aranđelovac		
- * Club domestic league appearances and goals as of 19 March 2026

Aleksandar Stanisavljević (born 11 June 1989) is a Serbian footballer who plays as a winger for Šumadija District League club Šumadija Aranđelovac.

== Club career ==
Born in Požarevac, SR Serbia, Stanisavljević moved to Austria during the 1990s to escape the Yugoslav War. He played there as well as in Hungary before returning to Serbia in 2013 to play with Serbian First League side FK Sloga Petrovac na Mlavi. During the winter break of the 2013–14 season he joined Serbian SuperLiga side OFK Beograd, and in summer 2014 he moved to another SuperLiga club, FK Donji Srem. On the beginning of 2015, he moved to Vojvodina where he made an impact in the games of UEFA Europa League especially in the glorious 4–0 away win against Italian club UC Sampdoria, having one goal and one assist. On 24 December 2015, he signed a 3,5 years' contract with Super League Greece side Asteras Tripolis for an undisclosed fee.

== Honours ==
Individual

- Serbian SuperLiga Player of the Week: 2021–22 (Round 19)
