= Serbian League =

- Founded: 1992
- Country: Serbia and Montenegro (1992–2006); Serbia (2006–present)
- Confederation: UEFA
- Divisions: Serbian League Belgrade; Serbian League East; Serbian League Vojvodina; Serbian League West
- Number of clubs: 62
- Level on pyramid: 3
- Promotion to: Serbian First League
- Relegation to: Serbian Zone League
- Domestic cup: Serbian Cup
- Current champions: Teleoptik (Belgrade); Bor 1919 (East); Naftagas (Vojvodina); Metalac (West) (2025–26)

The Serbian League (Serbian: Српска лига / Srpska liga) is the third level football league in Serbia. It consists of four groups, namely Belgrade, East, Vojvodina, and West. The winner of each group earns promotion to the Serbian First League.

== History ==
=== 1992–1995 ===
In the summer of 1992, following the dissolution of Yugoslavia, the Serbian League became one of the two leagues (together with the Montenegrin League) that replaced the Yugoslav Third League, serving as the third level of newly formed league system in Serbia and Montenegro (then known as FR Yugoslavia). It was divided into three groups:

- Serbian League East
- Serbian League North
- Serbian League West

=== 1995–2003 ===
In the summer of 1995, after the initial three seasons, the league expanded from three to six groups. The Serbian League East split into the Serbian League Niš and Serbian League Timok, the Serbian League North split into the Serbian League Belgrade and Serbian League Vojvodina, while the Serbian League West split into the Serbian League Danube and Serbian League Morava. In the summer 1997, the Serbian League Kosovo was formed but lasted for only one season.

- Serbian League Belgrade
- Serbian League Danube
- Serbian League Morava
- Serbian League Niš
- Serbian League Timok
- Serbian League Vojvodina
- Serbian League Kosovo

=== 2003–present ===
In the summer of 2003, the Serbian League went through a second major reorganization, when the number of groups was reduced to four. The Serbian League Niš and Serbian League Timok merged back into the Serbian League East, while the Serbian League Danube and Serbian League Morava merged back into the Serbian League West. Those two groups, East and West, previously existed from 1992 to 1995.

- Serbian League Belgrade
- Serbian League East
- Serbian League Vojvodina
- Serbian League West

== Winners ==
=== 1992–1995 ===
| Season | East | North | West |
|---|---|---|---|
| 1992–93 | Topličanin | Čukarički | Badnjevac |
| 1993–94 | Železničar Niš | Hajduk Beograd | Budućnost Valjevo |
| 1994–95 | Jedinstvo Paraćin | Železnik | Radnički Kragujevac |

=== 1995–2003 ===
| Season | Belgrade | Danube | Morava | Niš | Timok | Vojvodina | Kosovo |
|---|---|---|---|---|---|---|---|
| 1995–96 | Palilulac Beograd | Sartid Smederevo | Arsenal Kragujevac | Sinđelić Niš | Radnički Pirot | Solunac Karađorđevo | |
| 1996–97 | Milicionar | Mladost-Goša | Sloga Kraljevo | Vučje | Napredak Kušiljevo | Mladost Apatin | |
| 1997–98 | Kolubara | Železničar Lajkovac | Bane | Winner Broker | Jedinstvo Paraćin | ČSK Čelarevo | Crvena Zvezda Gnjilane |
| 1998–99 | BSK Borča | Rudar Kostolac | Šumadija Kragujevac | OFK Niš | Trayal Kruševac | Cement Beočin | |
| 1999–2000 | Bežanija | Jedinstvo Ub | Zastava Kragujevac | Železničar Niš | Rudar Bor | Mladost Lukićevo | |
| 2000–01 | Mladenovac | | Polet Ljubić | Radnički Pirot | Građanski Svilajnac | Veternik | |
| 2001–02 | Dorćol | Budućnost Valjevo | Metalac Gornji Milanovac | Car Konstantin | Timok | Elan Srbobran | |
| 2002–03 | Bežanija | Jedinstvo Ub | Novi Pazar | Vlasina | Morava Ćuprija | Proleter Zrenjanin | |

=== 2003–present ===
| Season | Belgrade | East | Vojvodina | West |
|---|---|---|---|---|
| 2003–04 | Voždovac | Kosanica | Spartak Subotica | Mladost Lučani |
| 2004–05 | Mladenovac | Radnički Pirot | Glogonj | Radnički Kragujevac |
| 2005–06 | BSK Borča | Dinamo Vranje | Inđija | Mladost Lučani |
| 2006–07 | Hajduk Beograd | Jagodina | Novi Sad | Metalac Gornji Milanovac |
| 2007–08 | Kolubara | Dinamo Vranje | Zlatibor Voda | Mladi Radnik Požarevac |
| 2008–09 | Zemun | Radnički Niš | Proleter Novi Sad | Sloga Kraljevo |
| 2009–10 | BASK | Sinđelić Niš | Big Bull Bačinci | Šumadija Radnički 1923 |
| 2010–11 | Mladenovac | Radnički Niš | Donji Srem | Sloga Kraljevo |
| 2011–12 | Voždovac | Timok | Radnički Nova Pazova | Jedinstvo Užice |
| 2012–13 | Sinđelić Beograd | Radnik Surdulica | Dolina Padina | Sloga Petrovac |
| 2013–14 | Kolubara | Moravac Mrštane | OFK Bačka | Mačva Šabac |
| 2014–15 | Zemun | Dinamo Vranje | ČSK Čelarevo | Loznica |
| 2015–16 | Budućnost Dobanovci | Radnički Pirot | OFK Odžaci | Mačva Šabac |
| 2016–17 | Teleoptik | Temnić 1924 | Bratstvo 1946 | Radnički 1923 |
| 2017–18 | Žarkovo | Trayal Kruševac | Bečej 1918 | Zlatibor Čajetina |
| 2018–19 | Grafičar Beograd | Radnički Pirot | Kabel | Smederevo 1924 |
| 2019–20 | IMT | Jagodina Tabane | Železničar Pančevo | Borac 1926 |
| 2020–21 | Teleoptik | Timok 1919 | Mladost Novi Sad | Sloga Požega |
| 2021–22 | Radnički Beograd | Trayal Kruševac | OFK Vršac | Sloboda Užice |
| 2022–23 | OFK Beograd | Dubočica | Tekstilac Odžaci | Smederevo 1924 |
| 2023–24 | Zemun | Trayal Kruševac | Železničar Inđija | Borac 1926 |
| 2024–25 | Ušće | SU Dinamo Jug | Kabel | FAP |
| 2025–26 | Teleoptik | Bor 1919 | Naftagas | Metalac |
