= Milan Bojović =

Serbian footballer

Personal information
- Full name: Milan Bojović
- Date of birth: 13 April 1987 (age 39)
- Place of birth: Lučani, SFR Yugoslavia
- Height: 1.87 m (6 ft 2 in)
- Position: Striker

Team information
- Current team: Sloboda Čačak

Youth career
- Partizan

Senior career*
Years	Team	Apps	(Gls)
2004–2005	Radnički Klupci	14	(8)
2005–2006	Srem	27	(2)
2006–2007	Teleoptik	28	(13)
2007–2009	Čukarički	53	(11)
2009–2011	Jagodina	46	(15)
2011–2012	Vojvodina	39	(10)
2013–2014	Panetolikos	50	(18)
2014	Bnei Sakhnin	10	(1)
2015–2016	Larissa	47	(13)
2016–2017	Mladost Lučani	26	(16)
2017	Kaisar	13	(1)
2018	Zhetysu	13	(4)
2019	Mladost Lučani	14	(3)
2019	Radnički Niš	1	(0)
2019–2023	Mladost Lučani	92	(45)
2023	Turon	7	(0)
2023–2024	Napredak Kruševac	22	(3)
2024–2025	FAP	46	(23)
2026–	Sloboda Čačak		
- * Club domestic league appearances and goals as of 21 March 2026

Milan Bojović (Serbian Cyrillic: Милан Бојовић; born 13 April 1987) is a Serbian professional footballer who plays as a striker for Sloboda Čačak.

== Career ==
Bojović came through the youth system of Partizan, but never played for the first team. He started his senior career with Radnički Klupci, before playing for Srem and Teleoptik. Between 2007 and 2012, Bojović made 138 appearances in the Serbian SuperLiga and scored 36 goals, while playing for Čukarički, Jagodina and Vojvodina.

In the 2013 winter transfer window, Bojović moved to Greece and signed with Panetolikos. He also played for Israeli club Bnei Sakhnin, before returning to Greece and signing with Larissa in January 2015. From June to September 2015, Bojović was unable to play in the country, due to expired visa.

In July 2016, Bojović returned to his homeland and signed with his hometown club Mladost Lučani. He was the team's top scorer with 16 league goals in the 2016–17 season, leading them to a fourth-place finish, their highest league position to date. In June 2017, Bojović signed for Kazakhstan Premier League side Kaisar, with the club announcing his departure to Zhetysu in January 2018.

In the 2019 winter transfer window, Bojović made a return to Mladost Lučani. He scored his 100th goal in the Serbian SuperLiga on 12 November 2022.

== Career statistics ==
As of 21 November 2022

Appearances and goals by club, season and competition
Club	Season	League			Cup		Continental		Total	
Club	Season	Division	Apps	Goals	Apps	Goals	Apps	Goals	Apps	Goals
Čukarički	2007–08	Serbian SuperLiga	23	6	1	0	—		24	6
Čukarički	2008–09	Serbian SuperLiga	30	5	1	1	—		31	6
Čukarički	Total		53	11	2	1	—		55	12
Jagodina	2009–10	Serbian SuperLiga	26	12	2	2	—		28	14
Jagodina	2010–11	Serbian SuperLiga	20	3	3	1	—		23	4
Jagodina	Total		46	15	5	3	—		51	18
Vojvodina	2011–12	Serbian SuperLiga	27	7	5	0	0	0	32	7
Vojvodina	2012–13	Serbian SuperLiga	12	3	3	1	4	1	19	5
Vojvodina	Total		39	10	8	1	4	1	51	12
Panetolikos	2012–13	Football League Greece	20	12	0	0	—		20	12
Panetolikos	2013–14	Super League Greece	30	6	2	0	—		32	6
Panetolikos	Total		50	18	2	0	—		52	18
Bnei Sakhnin	2014–15	Israeli Premier League	10	1	0	0	—		10	1
Larissa	2014–15	Football League Greece	23	7	0	0	—		23	7
Larissa	2015–16	Football League Greece	24	6	4	1	—		28	7
Larissa	Total		47	13	4	1	—		51	14
Mladost Lučani	2016–17	Serbian SuperLiga	26	16	2	1	—		28	17
Kaisar	2017	Kazakhstan Premier League	13	1	0	0	—		13	1
Zhetysu	2018	Kazakhstan Premier League	13	4	0	0	—		13	4
Mladost Lučani	2018–19	Serbian SuperLiga	14	3	2	1	—		16	4
Radnički Niš	2019–20	Serbian SuperLiga	1	0	0	0	2	0	3	0
Mladost Lučani	2019–20	Serbian SuperLiga	18	7	2	0	—		20	7
Mladost Lučani	2020–21	Serbian SuperLiga	29	18	0	0	—		29	18
Mladost Lučani	2021–22	Serbian SuperLiga	26	9	1	0	—		27	9
Mladost Lučani	2022–23	Serbian SuperLiga	19	11	1	0	—		20	11
Mladost Lučani	Total		92	45	4	0	—		96	45
Career total			404	137	29	8	6	1	439	146
