= FK Mokra Gora =

Serbian football club

Mokra Gora
- Full name: Fudbalski Klub Mokra Gora
- Founded: 15 March 1972; 54 years ago
- Ground: Stadion Mala Marakana, Zubin Potok
- Capacity: 500
- President: Radisav Mutavdzić
- League: Morava Zone League
- 2024–25: Morava Zone League, 3rd of 14
Home colours	Away colours

FK Mokra Gora (Serbian Cyrillic: ФК Мокра Гора; Albanian: KF Mokra Gora) is a football club based in Zubin Potok, Kosovo. They compete in the Morava Zone League, the fourth tier of the national league system.

== History ==
The club participated in the last two seasons of the Serbia and Montenegro Cup (2004–05 and 2005–06). They were eliminated in the opening round on each occasion, convincingly losing to Obilić (5–1) and OFK Beograd (3–0), respectively. In the 2006–07 Serbian Cup, the club would go on to defeat Borac Čačak in the first round on penalties. They subsequently played Red Star Belgrade and narrowly lost 2–1 to the eventual winners of the competition.

In the 2014–15 season, the club won the Morava Zone League and took promotion to the Serbian League West. They spent five seasons in the third tier of Serbian football, before being relegated to the Šumadija-Raška Zone League in 2020. Only Mokra Gora and OFK Mihajlovac were relegated in the season which was finished early due to the COVID pandemic; in the other leagues no clubs were.

== Honours ==
Morava Zone League (Tier 4)

- 2014–15

== Seasons ==
Season	League									Cup
Season	Division	Pld	W	D	L	GF	GA	Pts	Pos	Cup
Serbia and Montenegro
2005–06	4 – Šumadija	34	26	3	5	70	22	81	2nd	Round of 32
Serbia
2006–07	4 – Šumadija	34	23	6	5	82	25	75	2nd	Round of 16
2007–08	4 – Morava	38	15	8	15	48	57	53	13th	Round of 32
2008–09	4 – Morava	34	11	3	20	32	57	36	16th	—
2009–10	4 – Morava	30	17	4	9	62	37	55	3rd	—
2010–11	4 – Morava	30	18	3	9	66	31	57	2nd	Round of 32
2011–12	4 – Morava	28	12	4	12	41	39	40	7th	—
2012–13	4 – Morava	30	19	8	3	58	21	65	2nd	—
2013–14	4 – Morava	30	19	5	6	70	32	62	2nd	Preliminary round
2014–15	4 – Morava	30	20	5	5	64	31	65	1st	—
2015–16	3 – West	30	11	5	14	31	35	38	12th	Round of 32
2016–17	3 – West	30	8	8	14	25	35	32	13th	—
2017–18	3 – West	34	10	10	14	38	42	40	11th	—
2018–19	3 – West	30	11	7	12	38	33	40	9th	Preliminary round
2019–20	3 – West	18 (Note: The season was cut short due to the COVID-19 pandemic in Serbia.)	3	4	11	10	32	13	18th	—
2020–21	4 – Šumadija-Raška	28	14	7	7	66	40	49	4th	Preliminary round
2021–22	4 – Šumadija-Raška	24	8	5	11	41	40	29	9th	Preliminary round
2022–23	4 – Šumadija-Raška	26	10	9	7	42	40	39	5th	Preliminary round
2023–24	4 – Šumadija-Raška	25	11	3	11	34	33	36	6th	
2024–25	4 – Morava	26	14	6	6	56	29	48	3rd	
