= FK Karađorđe Topola =

Serbian football club

Karađorđe Topola
- Full name: Fudbalski Klub Karađorđe Topola
- Nickname: Voždovi (The Leaders)
- Founded: 1919; 107 years ago
- Ground: Stadion Šilja Tadić
- Capacity: 250
- President: Saša Vujičić
- Head coach: Slobodan Stašević
- League: Dunav Zone League
- 2024–25: Dunav Zone League, 8th
Home colours	Away colours

FK Karađorđe Topola (Serbian Cyrillic: ФК Карађорђе Топола) is a football club based in Topola, Serbia. The club competes in the Dunav Zone League, the fourth tier of the national league system.

== History ==
The club was founded on 16 November 1919 and named after Serbian revolutionist Karađorđe. They changed their name to Oplenac in 1929 and later to Jedinstvo in 1949. In 1954, the club reverted its name to Oplenac and eventually to Karađorđe in 1964.

Following the breakup of Yugoslavia, the club competed in the Serbian League Morava for five seasons between 1997 and 2002. They returned to the third tier in 2014, spending four seasons in the Serbian League West until 2018. In late 2019, the club celebrated its 100th anniversary.

=== Recent league history ===
Season	Division	P	W	D	L	F	A	Pts	Pos
2020–21	4 - Podunavlje-Šumadija Zone League	34	15	7	12	63	47	52	7th
2021–22	4 - Podunavlje-Šumadija Zone League	30	13	6	11	50	47	45	5th
2022–23	4 - Podunavlje-Šumadija Zone League	26	10	4	12	35	41	34	7th
2023–24	4 - Podunavlje-Šumadija Zone League	22	12	4	6	34	20	40	3rd
2024–25	4 - Dunav Zone League	26	11	4	11	33	37	37	8th

== Honours ==
Šumadija District League (Tier 5)

- 2010–11

== Notable players ==
For a list of all FK Karađorđe Topola players with a Wikipedia article, see Category:FK Karađorđe Topola players.
