= FK Drina Ljubovija =

Serbian football club

Drina Ljubovija
- Full name: FK Drina Ljubovija
- Founded: 1928; 97 years ago
- Ground: Stadion pod Kikom, Ljubovija
- Capacity: 1,000
- President: Miroslav Jakovljević
- League: Drina Zone League
- 2024–25: Drina Zone League, 5th of 13
Home colours	Away colours

FK Drina Ljubovija (Serbian Cyrillic: ФК Дрина Љубовија) is a football club based in Ljubovija, Serbia. They compete in the Drina Zone League, the fourth tier of the national league system.

== History ==
Founded in 1928, the club celebrated its 90th anniversary by winning the Drina Zone League in the 2017–18 season and earning promotion to the Serbian League West. They were promptly relegated to the Kolubara-Mačva Zone League.

=== Recent league history ===
Season	Division	P	W	D	L	F	A	Pts	Pos
2020–21	Kolubara-Mačva Zone Lg.	30	10	4	16	40	44	34	10th
2021–22	Kolubara-Mačva Zone Lg.	24	4	10	10	28	46	22	13th
2022–23	Mačva District League	30	22	2	6	74	21	68	2nd
2023–24	Kolubara-Mačva Zone Lg.	22	9	8	5	35	18	35	4th
2024–25	Drina Zone League	24	10	5	9	34	28	35	5th

== Honours ==
Drina Zone League (Tier 4)

- 2017–18

Mačva District League (Tier 5)

- 2015–16

== Historical list of coaches ==
- (Serbia) Ivan Čančarević (2016–2017)
- (Serbia) Aleksandar Petaković (2018)
- (Serbia) Vladimir Mudrinić (2018-2019)
- (Serbia) Milan Čančarević (2019–2022)
- (Serbia) Miroslav Milanović
- (Bosnia and Herzegovina) Zumbul Mahalbašić (2025-)
