= Ervin Kačar =

Serbian association football player

Personal information
- Date of birth: 25 October 1991 (age 35)
- Place of birth: Novi Pazar, SFR Yugoslavia
- Height: 1.77 m (5 ft 10 in)
- Position: Right-back

Youth career
- Novi Pazar

Senior career*
Years	Team	Apps	(Gls)
2009–2014	Pazar Juniors		
2014	AS Koma Elektra	1	(0)
2015–2016	FK Jošanica	29	(5)
2016–2017	Novi Pazar	9	(0)
2017–2018	Pobeda	4	(0)
2018	Petrovac	12	(0)
2018–2019	Ferizaj	16	(1)
2019–2020	Novi Pazar	15	(1)
2020	FK Tutin		
2020	Trepça '89	13	(0)
2021	Berane		
2023	FK Umka		
2023	FK Jošanica		
2024-	FK Umka		
- * Club domestic league appearances and goals as of 16:34, 21 February 2021 (UTC)

Ervin Kačar (Serbian Cyrillic: Ервин Качар; born 25 October 1991) is a Serbian football right back.

== Club career ==
=== Early years ===
Born in Novi Pazar, Kačar passed the youth school of the local football club with same name. He was a member of FK Pazar Juniors until 2013. After he spent 2014 with AS Koma Elektra in Austria, Ervin returned to his home town and joined Serbian League West side FK Jošanica for the spring half of the 2014–15 season. He also stayed with the club for the next season, after relegation in the Morava Zone League and was one of the best players, helping the team to return quickly to the League West. During the season, he was also a vice-captain, after experienced defender Edin Ferizović. Although he started his career as a more offensive player on the wing position, Kačar spent the mostly time with Jošanica as a right-back, but he also scored 5 goals, and was nominated for the best full-back of the league for the 2015–16 season.

=== Novi Pazar ===
In summer 2016, Kačar moved to Serbian SuperLiga club Novi Pazar, and signed two-year contract at the beginning of August. He made his debut for new club in 4th fixture of the 2016–17 Serbian SuperLiga season, replacing Slavko Marić in the 44 minute of the match. Kačar also made his Serbian Cup debut in a match against Mladost Bački Jarak, played on 21 September 2016. He started his first SuperLiga match on the field in the 16 fixture match against Vojvodina.

== Career statistics ==
=== Club ===
As of 31 May 2017

Club	Season	League			Cup		Continental		Other		Total	
Club	Season	Division	Apps	Goals	Apps	Goals	Apps	Goals	Apps	Goals	Apps	Goals
Jošanica	2014–15	League West	6	0	—		—		—		6	0
Jošanica	2015–16	Morava Zone	23	5	—		—		—		23	5
Jošanica	Total		29	5	—		—		—		29	5
Novi Pazar	2016–17	SuperLiga	9	0	1	0	—		—		10	0
Career total			38	5	1	0	—		—		39	5
