= Borivoje Rumenić =

Serbian footballer

Personal information
- Date of birth: 10 May 1990 (age 36)
- Place of birth: Kraljevo, SFR Yugoslavia
- Height: 1.96 m (6 ft 5 in)
- Position: Goalkeeper

Team information
- Current team: Sloboda Čačak
- Number: 1

Youth career
- 2004–2008: Smederevo

Senior career*
Years	Team	Apps	(Gls)
2008–2010	Smederevo	1	(0)
2010	→ Hajduk Beograd (loan)	10	(0)
2010	→ Vujić Valjevo (loan)	14	(0)
2011–2013	Bežanija	10	(0)
2012–2013	→ Polet Ljubić (loan)	32	(0)
2013–2014	Sloga Petrovac	9	(0)
2014-2016	Polet Ljubić		
2017	Sloga Požega		
2017	Tutin		
2018	Radnički Kragujevac	2	(0)
2019	Polet Ljubić		
2020	Borac Čačak	0	(0)
2021–	Sloboda Čačak		
- * Club domestic league appearances and goals as of 6 January 2021

Borivoje Rumenić (Serbian Cyrillic: Боривоје Руменић; born 10 May 1990) is a Serbian footballer who plays as a goalkeeper for Sloboda Čačak.

== Career ==
Playing for Smederevo, he made his Superliga debut on 1 November 2009 in a 2-1 victory away to Hajduk Kula.

In the beginning of 2018, Rumenić went on a trial at FK Radnički 1923, having played for FK Tutin before that. He signed with Radnički in the summer 2018.

In 2019, he joined FK Polet Ljubić again.
