= Podunavlje-Šumadija Zone League =

Serbian fourth tier football league

- Founded: 2018
- Folded: 2024
- Country: Serbia
- Number of clubs: 12
- Level on pyramid: 4
- Promotion to: Serbian League West
- Relegation to: Braničevo District League; Podunavlje District League; Šumadija District League
- Domestic cup: Serbian Cup
- Last champions: VGSK (2023–24)
- Most championships: RSK Rabrovo (2 titles)

Podunavlje-Šumadija Zone League (Serbian: Зонска лига Подунавско-Шумадијска / Zonska liga Podunavsko-Šumadijska) was one of the Serbian Zone League divisions, the fourth tier of the Serbian football league system. It was run by the Football Association of West Serbia.

The league was founded in 2018, together with the Kolubara-Mačva Zone League, Šumadija-Raška Zone League and West Morava Zone League. In 2024, these four leagues folded and the 3 old Zone Leagues were reestablished: the Morava Zone League, Dunav Zone League and Drina Zone Leagues.

== Seasons ==
Season	Winner	Runner-up
2018–19	RSK Rabrovo	Karađorđe Topola
2019–20	Canceled due to the COVID-19 pandemic	
2020–21	RSK Rabrovo	OFK Mihajlovac
2021–22	OFK Mihajlovac	Pomoravlje 1946
2022–23	Sloga 33	VGSK
2023–24	VGSK	Šumadija Aranđelovac
