= Šumadija-Raška Zone League =

Serbian fourth tier football league

- Founded: 2018
- Folded: 2024
- Country: Serbia
- Number of clubs: 11
- Level on pyramid: 4
- Promotion to: Serbian League West
- Relegation to: Raška District League; Kragujevac First League; Šumadija District League; Football First League of North Kosovo
- Domestic cup: Serbian Cup
- Last champions: Sloga Kraljevo (2023–24)

Šumadija-Raška Zone League (Serbian: Шумадијско-рашка зонска лига / Šumadijsko-Raška zonska liga) was one of the Serbian Zone League divisions, the fourth tier of the Serbian football league system. It was run by the Football Association of West Serbia.

The league was founded in 2018, together with the Kolubara-Mačva Zone League, Podunavlje-Šumadija Zone League and West Morava Zone League. Clubs that participated in this competition came from Raška District, the city of Kragujevac, municipality of Knić and Serbian clubs from District of Mitrovica.

In 2024, this league was folded, together with the Kolubara-Mačva Zone League, Podunavlje-Šumadija Zone League and West Morava Zone League, and the 3 old Zone Leagues were re-established : Morava Zone League, Dunav Zone League and Drina Zone League.

== Winners of all championships ==
Season	No. of clubs	Champions	Points	Runners-up	Points
2018–19.	14	Sušica, Kragujevac	63	Sloga, Kraljevo	55
2019–20.^{1}	16	Gruža, Gruža	38	Šumadija 1903, Kragujevac	38
2020–21.	16	Real, Podunavci	65	Šumadija 1903, Kragujevac	58
2021–22.	14	Tutin, Tutin	64	Jošanica, Novi Pazar	62
2022-23.	14	Jošanica, Novi Pazar	62	Bane 1931, Raška	56
2023-24.	12	Sloga, Kraljevo	58	Šumadija 1903, Kragujevac	54

- ^{1} Season cancelled after 16 rounds due to COVID-19 pandemic
