= FK Polimlje =

Serbian football club

Polimlje
- Full name: Fudbalski Klub Polimlje
- Founded: 1926; 100 years ago
- Ground: Stadion FK Polimlje, Prijepolje
- Capacity: 4,500
- President: Aleksandar Drašković
- League: Serbian League West
- 2024–25: Drina Zone League, 6th of 13 (promoted)
Home colours	Away colours

FK Polimlje (Serbian Cyrillic: ФК Полимље) is a football club based in Prijepolje, Serbia. They compete in the Serbian League West, the third tier of the national league system.

== History ==
Founded in 1926, the club participated in the Second League of FR Yugoslavia for two seasons between 1996 and 1998.

While they only finished 6th in the 2024-25 season, Polimlje was assigned a final place in the third tier to fill Loznica's spot.

=== Recent league history ===
Season	Division	P	W	D	L	F	A	Pts	Pos
2020–21	4 - West Morava Zone League	28	10	3	15	37	64	33	9th
2021–22	4 - West Morava Zone League	26	8	3	15	36	57	27	11th
2022–23	4 - West Morava Zone League	26	13	5	8	40	29	44	6th
2023–24	4 - West Morava Zone League	25	15	7	3	53	27	52	2nd
2024–25	4 - Drina Zone League	24	11	2	11	39	33	35	6th

== Honours ==
Zlatibor District League (Tier 5)

- 2008–09

== Notable players ==
This is a list of players who have played at full international level.

- (Serbia and Montenegro) (Serbia) Ivica Dragutinović
- (Serbia and Montenegro) Mihajlo Pjanović

For a list of all FK Polimlje players with a Wikipedia article, see Category:FK Polimlje players.

== Historical list of coaches ==
- (Serbia) Ivan Čančarević (2014–2015)
- (Serbia) Nihad Nalbantić (2016)
- (Serbia) Ivica Cvetanovski (2016)
- (Serbia) Kuzman Babeu (2016–2017)
- (Serbia) Aleksandar Petaković (2017)
- (Serbia) Nebojša Ružić (2017)
- (Serbia) Dragan Vulević (2017–2018)
- (Serbia) Milan Čančarević (2018)
- (Serbia) Enes Rovčanin (2018)
- (Serbia) Nebojša Ružić (2019)
- (Serbia) Zulfo Malagić (2019)
- (Serbia) Siniša Ljujić (2019–2021)
- (Serbia) Siniša Ljujić (2022-)
