= Borivoje =

Borivoje (Serbian Cyrillic: Боривоје) is a Serbian masculine given name of Slavic origin. It may refer to:

- Borivoje Đorđević (born 1948), Serbian footballer
- Borivoje Filipović (born 1982), Serbian footballer
- Borivoje Grbić (born 1972), comic artist
- Borivoje Kostić (1930–2011), footballer
- Borivoje Mirković (1884–1969), general
- Borivoje Todorović (born 1930), Serbian actor
- Borivoje Ristić (born 1983), football goalkeeper
- Borivoje Rumenić (born 1990), football goalkeeper
- Borivoje Vukov (1929–2010), wrestler

== See also ==
- Borivojević, surname
