= FK Rađevac =

- Full name: Fudbalski Klub Rađevac
- Founded: 1922; 104 years ago
- Ground: , Krupanj
- Capacity: 500
- League: Drina Zone League
- 2024–25: Drina Zone League, 9th
Home colours	Away colours

FK Rađevac is a Serbian football club from Krupanj. As of the 2025-26 season, they compete in the Drina Zone League, the 4th tier of Serbian football.

== History ==
The club was established in 1922 as Rađevac; however, it folded in 1925. In 1948, after World War II, Rađevac was reestablished. Shortly after, the club became part of the Football League in Western Serbia.

In 1950, the club entered the Belgrade Football League.

In 1970, the club entered the Podrinje-Kolubara League. In 1972, the club took second place. In 1975, the club entered the Posavina-Podunavlje Zone League.

In 1978–79, the club was placed first in the Posavina-Podunavlje Zone League during the fall and won the Podrinje Cup.

In 1980–81, the club finished in second place in the Posavina-Podunavlje Zone League (out of 14 teams), right behind FK Jedinstvo Ub.

In 1982, the club entered the Second Serbian League.

In 1992, the club entered the newly formed Podunavlje-Posavina Zone League.

In 1999, the club made its biggest success by entering the Second League of FR Yugoslavia.

In 2021, the club repeated one of the greatest successes in its history by winning first place in the Kolubara-Mačva Zone League, and placement in the Serbian League West after 23 years.

=== Recent league history ===
Season	Division	P	W	D	L	F	A	Pts	Pos
2020–21	4 - Kolubara-Mačva Zone League	30	21	6	3	63	24	69	1st
2021–22	3 - Serbian League West	30	9	9	12	28	32	36	11th
2022–23	3 - Serbian League West	30	7	9	14	28	39	30	15th
2023–24	4 - Kolubara-Mačva Zone League	27	11	7	9	36	35	40	1st
2024–25	4 - Drina Zone League	24	8	6	10	37	33	30	9th

== Notable players ==
- Dragan Pantelić
- Zvonko Popović
- Njegoš Petrović
