= FK Takovo =

- Full name: Fudbalski klub Takovo
- Nickname: Ustanici
- Founded: 1911; 115 years ago
- Ground: Takovo Stadium, Gornji Milanovac
- Capacity: 5,000
- Chairman: Vladimir Simić
- League: Serbian League West
- 2024–25: Serbian League West, 10th
Home colours	Away colours

FK Takovo (Serbian Cyrillic: Фудбалски клуб Таково) is a football club from Gornji Milanovac, Serbia. The club is a part of the Sports Society Takovo. The team plays in Serbian League West, the third tier of the Serbian football league system.

The club was founded in July 1911 and is one of the oldest clubs in Serbia. It is named after nearby historic village of Takovo, where the Second Serbian uprising started in 1815.

== History ==
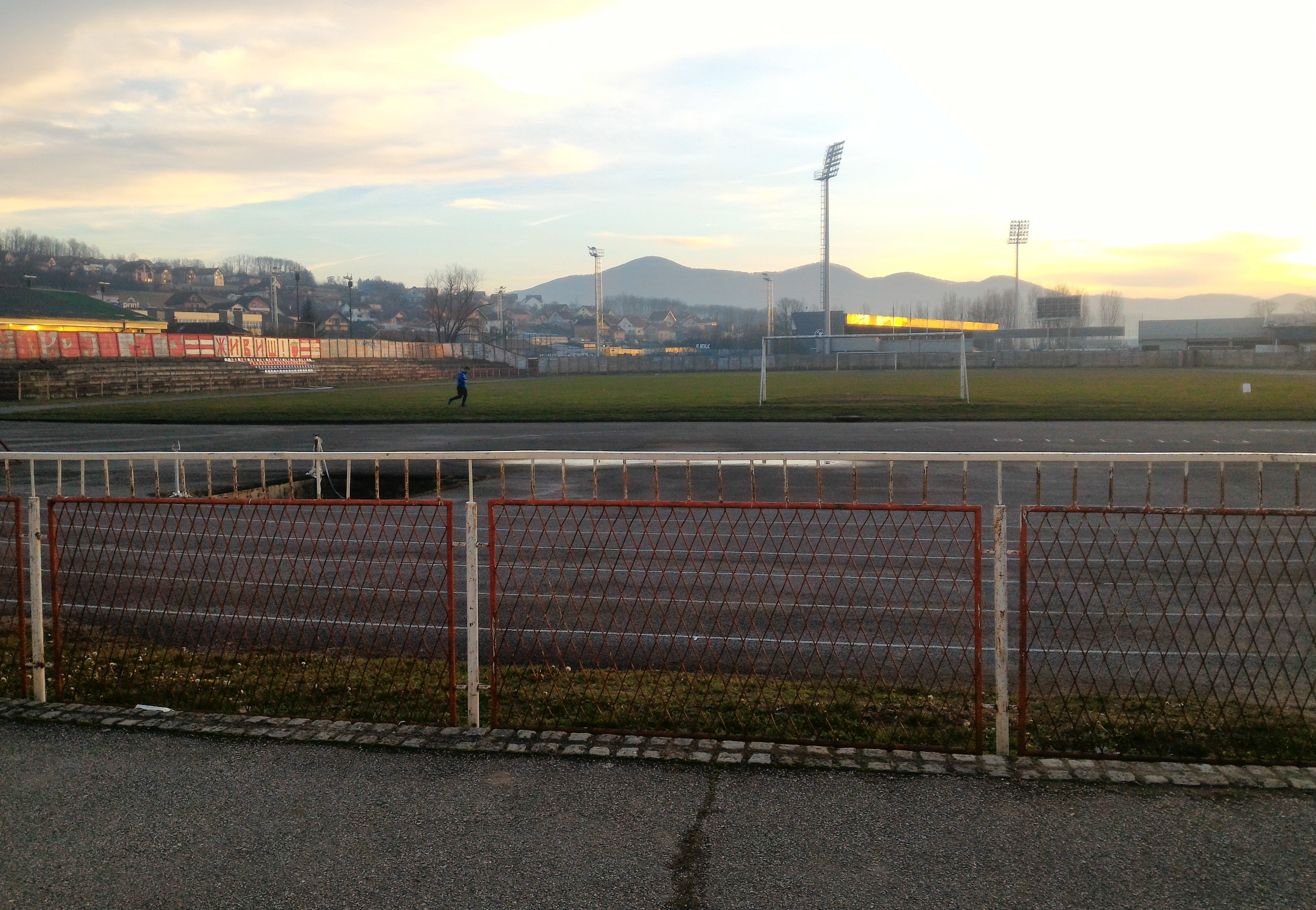
Sports society Takovo stadium, the home of FK Takovo since 1951.

The club was founded in July 1911 through the initiative of Gornji Milanovac's school youth led by Dušan Borisavljević and Petar Trifunović, who brought the first football ball, that same year, from Belgrade to Milanovac.

== FK Takovo in recent years ==
Season	Tier	League	Position	Pld.	W.	D.	L.	GF	GA	GD	Pts	National cup
2015–16	4	Morava Zone League	5th	28	12	5	11	47	33	+14	41	Did not qualify
2016–17	4	Morava Zone League	3rd	28	14	8	6	51	23	+28	49	Did not qualify
2017–18	4	Morava Zone League	2nd	28	21	6	1	69	10	+59	69	Did not qualify
2018–19	4	Morava Zone League – West	1st	24	17	4	3	56	16	+40	55	Did not qualify
2019–20	3	Serbian League West	12th	19	6	1	12	14	28	-14	19	Did not qualify
2020–21	3	Serbian League West	8th	34	12	14	8	40	27	+13	50	Did not qualify
2021–22	3	Serbian League West	8th	30	10	11	9	31	24	+7	41	Did not qualify
2022–23	3	Serbian League West	7th	30	9	10	11	37	39	-2	37	Did not qualify
2023—24	3	Serbian League West	12th	30	9	7	14	26	35	-9	34	Did not qualify

== Notable former players ==
- Radmilo Ivančević, 5 appearances for Yugoslavia Olympic team
- Saša Zorić (Youth team), 2 appearances for FR Yugoslavia national team.
- Slobodan Santrač (Youth team), 8 appearances for Yugoslavia national team.

For the list of former and current players with Wikipedia article, please see: Category:FK Takovo players.

== Sources ==
- Lošić, Borivoje; Mandić, Radmilo; Tatović, Milorad (2001). 90 godina Fudbalskog kluba Takovo. Gornji Milanovac: Eurografik. ISBN 978-86-7152-016-4.
