= FK Budućnost Krušik 2014 =

Serbian football club

Budućnost Krušik 2014
- Full name: Fudbalski Klub Budućnost Krušik 2014 Valjevo
- Founded: 2014; 12 years ago
- Ground: Stadion Park Pećina, Valjevo
- Capacity: 4,100
- President: Rodoljub Paunović
- Head coach: Kosta Marković
- League: Serbian League West
- 2024–25: Serbian League West, 6th
- Website: https://fkbuducnostkrusik.net/
Home colours	Away colours	Third colours

FK Budućnost Krušik 2014 (Serbian Cyrillic: ФК Будућност Крушик 2014) is a football club based in Valjevo, Serbia. They compete in the Serbian League West, the third tier of the national league system.

== History ==
The club was formed in July 2014 as a result of a merger between two Valjevo clubs: Budućnost and Krušik. They spent the first seven seasons since their inception in the Serbian League West, before suffering relegation to the Kolubara-Mačva Zone League in 2021. The club quickly recovered and returned to the third tier the following year as champions.

=== Recent league history ===
Season	Division	P	W	D	L	F	A	Pts	Pos
2020–21	Serbian League West	34	13	8	13	49	43	47	13th
2021–22	Kolubara-Mačva Zone L.	24	16	5	3	67	17	53	1st
2022–23	Serbian League West	30	9	10	11	27	39	37	8th
2023–24	Serbian League West	30	12	11	7	39	30	47	4th
2024–25	Serbian League West	30	10	11	9	34	29	41	6th

== Honours ==
Kolubara-Mačva Zone League (Tier 4)

- 2021–22

== Players ==
For the list of former and current players with Wikipedia article, please see: Category:FK Budućnost Valjevo players.

== Historical list of coaches ==
- (Serbia) Slaviša Božičić (2014)
- (Serbia) Dejan Nikolić (2015)
- (Serbia) Srđan Bajić (2015)
- (Serbia) Duško Obadović (201)
- (Serbia) Dejan Nikolić (2016–2018)
- (Serbia) Predrag Pejović (2018)
- (Serbia) Slaviša Kovačević (2018–2020)
- (Serbia) Vladica Petrović (2021)
- (Serbia) Srđan Jovanović (2021–2022)
- (Serbia) Željko Kovačević (2022)
- (Serbia) Đorđe Lazić (2022)
- (Serbia) Alen Tupajić (2022-12 Jan 2023)
- (Serbia) Predrag Simić (Jan 2023-Mar 2024)
- (Serbia) Kosta Marković (Mar 2024-)
