= FK Sloboda Čačak =

Sloboda Čačak
- Full name: Fudbalski Klub Sloboda Čačak
- Founded: 1949; 77 years ago
- Ground: , Čačak
- Capacity: 1,000
- League: Morava Zone League
- 2024–25: Morava Zone League, 8th

FK Sloboda Čačak (Serbian Cyrillic: ФК Слобода Чачак) is a football club from Čačak, Serbia.

Founded in 1949, the club has (as of 2024) competed in the 4th-tier Morava Zone League since 2014 after spending 8 seasons in the Serbian League West.

== Recent league history ==
| Season | Division | P | W | D | L | F | A | Pts | Pos |
|---|---|---|---|---|---|---|---|---|---|
| 2020–21 | 4 - West Morava Zone League | 28 | 16 | 4 | 8 | 59 | 40 | 52 | 4th |
| 2021–22 | 4 - West Morava Zone League | 26 | 24 | 1 | 1 | 84 | 19 | 70 (Note: The club was docked three points.) | 2nd |
| 2022–23 | 4 - West Morava Zone League | 26 | 14 | 6 | 6 | 62 | 39 | 48 | 3rd |
| 2023–24 | 4 - West Morava Zone League | 24 | 9 | 6 | 9 | 43 | 34 | 33 | 2nd |
| 2024–25 | 4 - Morava Zone League | 26 | 8 | 9 | 9 | 39 | 34 | 33 | 8th |
