= Kolubara-Mačva Zone League =

- Founded: 2018
- Folded: 2024
- Country: Serbia
- Number of clubs: 12
- Level on pyramid: 4
- Promotion to: Serbian League West
- Relegation to: Kolubara District League; Mačva District League
- Domestic cup: Serbian Cup
- Last champions: Lipolist (2023–24)

Kolubara-Mačva Zone League (Serbian: Зонска лига Колубарско-Мачванска / Zonska liga Kolubarsko-Mačvanska) was one of the Serbian Zone League divisions, the fourth tier of the Serbian football league system. It was run by the Football Association of West Serbia.

The league was founded in 2018, together with the Podunavlje-Šumadija Zone League, Šumadija-Raška Zone League and West Morava Zone League. In 2024, these four leagues folded and the 3 old Zone Leagues were reestablished: the Morava Zone League, Dunav Zone League and Drina Zone Leagues.

== Seasons ==
Season	Winner	Runner-up
2018–19	Mačva 1929	Železničar Lajkovac
2019–20	Železničar Lajkovac	Rađevac
2020–21	Rađevac	Sloga Bogosavac
2021–22	Budućnost Krušik 2014	Vrelo Sport
2022–23	Vrelo Sport	Borac Lešnica
2023–24	Lipolist	Borac Lešnica
