= FK Slavija Kragujevac =

Serbian football club

Slavija Kragujevac
- Full name: Fudbalski Klub Slavija Kragujevac
- Founded: 1922; 104 years ago
- Ground: Stadion Bresnica, Kragujevac
- Capacity: 2,000
- President: Marko Nović
- League: Kragujevac Second League
- 2024–25: Kragujevac Second League, 8th of 12
Home colours	Away colours

FK Slavija Kragujevac (Serbian Cyrillic: ФК Славија Крагујевац) is a football club based in Kragujevac, Serbia. They compete in the Kragujevac Second League, the sixth tier of the national league system.

== History ==
The club was founded in 1922 as Slavija. They subsequently won the First League of the Kragujevac Football Subassociation in 1934. Following the end of World War II, the club changed names several times, being known as Sloga, Dinamo, and Bresnica. They eventually switched their name back to Slavija in 1989.

=== Recent league history ===
Season	Division	P	W	D	L	F	A	Pts	Pos
2020–21	5 - Kragujevac First League	28	15	5	8	54	34	50	5th
2021–22	5 - Kragujevac First League	28	13	7	8	53	44	46	4th
2022–23	5 - Kragujevac First League	26	2	3	21	18	84	9	14th
2023–24	6 - Kragujevac 2nd League	22	8	1	13	31	50	25	9th
2024–25	6 - Kragujevac 2nd League	22	7	4	11	22	31	25	8th

== Honours ==
Kragujevac First League (Tier 5)

- 2011–12
