= FK Šumadija Aranđelovac =

- Full name: Fudbalski klub Šumadija Aranđelovac
- Founded: 1929; 97 years ago
- Ground: Gradski stadion Aranđelovac, Serbia
- Capacity: 2,440
- President: Dragan Savkić
- League: Šumadija District League
- 2024–25: Dunav Zone League, 10th (relegated)
Home colours

FK Šumadija Aranđelovac (Serbian Cyrillic: ФК Шумадија Аранђеловац) is a football club based in the town of Aranđelovac, Serbia. It was founded in 1929.

The club competed in the East Division of the Yugoslav Second League from 1971–72 to 1979–80 season. On two occasions they have reached the closing stages of the Yugoslav Cup. In 1973 they were eliminated in the second round by Radnički Niš and in the 1975–76 season they lost in quarter-finals to eventual winners Hajduk Split. The team is currently competing in the Šumadija District League, fifth-tier competition in the Serbian football league system.

== Recent league history ==
| Season | Division | P | W | D | L | F | A | Pts | Pos |
|---|---|---|---|---|---|---|---|---|---|
| 2020–21 | 3 - Serbian League West | 34 | 4 | 4 | 26 | 26 | 85 | 16 | 17th |
| 2021–22 | 4 - Podunavlje-Šumadija Zone League | 30 | 13 | 4 | 13 | 48 | 45 | 43 | 11th |
| 2022–23 | 4 - Podunavlje-Šumadija Zone League | 26 | 12 | 3 | 11 | 35 | 38 | 36 (Note: The club was docked twelve points.) | 6th |
| 2023–24 | 4 - Podunavlje-Šumadija Zone League | 27 | 11 | 3 | 13 | 36 | 33 | 36 | 8th |
| 2024–25 | 4 - Dunav Zone League | 26 | 8 | 7 | 11 | 24 | 41 | 31 | 9th |

== Notable players ==
List of former FK Šumadija Aranđelovac players with national team appearances:

- (Albania) Dodë Tahiri
- (Serbia) Nenad Mladenović
- (Serbia) Goran Pandurović
- (Tanzania) Nassor Hamoud

For the list of former and current players with Wikipedia article, please see: Category:FK Šumadija Aranđelovac players.
