= FK Bane =

Serbian football club

Bane 1931
- Full name: Fudbalski Klub Bane 1931
- Nickname: Beli (The Whites)
- Founded: 1931; 95 years ago
- Ground: Stadion FK Bane
- Capacity: 2,000
- League: Morava Zone League
- 2024–25: Morava Zone League, 9th
| Home colours | Away colours |

FK Bane 1931 (Serbian Cyrillic: ФК Бане 1931) is a football club based in Raška, Serbia. They compete in the Morava Zone League, the fourth tier of the national league system.

== History ==
Founded in 1931 as FK Studenica, the club later became known as FK Bane. They won the 1995–96 Šumadija Zone League with an unbeaten record, earning promotion to the Serbian League Morava. The club spent two seasons in the third tier, finishing as runners-up in 1996–97, before becoming champions in 1997–98 to reach the Second League of FR Yugoslavia. They placed third in Group West in their debut season in the second tier, narrowly missing out on promotion to the First League. The club remained a contender over the next four years, finishing no lower than fourth. They eventually suffered relegation to the Serbian League West in 2004.

== Honours ==
Serbian League Morava (Tier 3)

- 1997–98

Šumadija Zone League / Morava Zone League (Tier 4)

- 1995–96, 2005–06 / 2011–12

== Seasons ==
| Season | League | | | | | | | | | Cup |
| Season | Division | Pld | W | D | L | GF | GA | Pts | Pos | Cup |
Serbia and Montenegro
| 1995–96 | 4 – Šumadija | 30 | 21 | 9 | 0 | 78 | 24 | 72 | 1st | — |
| 1996–97 | 3 – Morava | 34 | 21 | 6 | 7 | 67 | 32 | 69 | 2nd | — |
| 1997–98 | 3 – Morava | 34 | 28 | 3 | 3 | 80 | 20 | 87 | 1st | — |
| 1998–99 | 2 – West | 21 (Note: The season was cut short due to the NATO bombing of Yugoslavia.) | 13 | 2 | 6 | 40 | 21 | 41 | 3rd | — |
| 1999–2000 | 2 – West | 34 | 16 | 13 | 5 | 54 | 31 | 61 | 4th | — |
| 2000–01 | 2 – West | 34 | 19 | 2 | 13 | 57 | 50 | 59 | 4th | — |
| 2001–02 | 2 – West | 32 | 17 | 6 | 9 | 68 | 31 | 57 | 3rd | — |
| 2002–03 | 2 – West | 33 | 15 | 8 | 10 | 49 | 35 | 53 | 2nd | — |
| 2003–04 | 2 – West | 36 | 4 | 5 | 27 | 27 | 71 | 17 | 9th | — |
| 2004–05 | 3 – West | 34 | 2 | 10 | 22 | 20 | 75 | 16 | 18th | — |
| 2005–06 | 4 – Šumadija | 34 | 26 | 5 | 3 | 89 | 22 | 83 | 1st | — |
Serbia
| 2006–07 | 3 – West | 34 | 12 | 5 | 17 | 52 | 66 | 41 | 14th | — |
| 2007–08 | 4 – Morava | 38 | 15 | 9 | 14 | 47 | 46 | 54 | 12th | — |
| 2008–09 | 4 – Morava | 34 | 10 | 9 | 15 | 32 | 39 | 39 | 13th | — |
| 2009–10 | 4 – Morava | 30 | 14 | 7 | 9 | 38 | 34 | 49 | 5th | — |
| 2010–11 | 4 – Morava | 30 | 15 | 5 | 10 | 60 | 37 | 50 | 4th | — |
| 2011–12 | 4 – Morava | 28 | 21 | 3 | 4 | 56 | 16 | 66 | 1st | — |
| 2012–13 | 3 – West | 30 | 10 | 6 | 14 | 27 | 42 | 36 | 10th | — |
| 2013–14 | 3 – West | 30 | 10 | 5 | 15 | 27 | 39 | 35 | 10th | — |
| 2014–15 | 3 – West | 30 | 6 | 5 | 19 | 20 | 47 | 23 | 15th | — |
| 2015–16 | 4 – Morava | 28 | 15 | 3 | 10 | 46 | 35 | 39 | 7th | — |
| 2016–17 | 4 – Morava | 28 | 14 | 6 | 8 | 58 | 36 | 48 | 4th | — |
| 2017–18 | 4 – Morava | 28 | 9 | 4 | 15 | 29 | 36 | 31 | 10th | — |
| 2018–19 | 4 – Šumadija-Raška | 26 | 9 | 5 | 12 | 45 | 52 | 31 | 11th | — |
| 2019–20 | 4 – Šumadija-Raška | 16 (Note: The season was cut short due to the COVID-19 pandemic in Serbia.) | 8 | 4 | 4 | 37 | 22 | 28 | 4th | — |
| 2020–21 | 3 – West | 34 | 1 | 5 | 28 | 18 | 98 | 8 | 18th | — |
| 2021–22 | 4 – Šumadija-Raška | 24 | 10 | 2 | 12 | 54 | 46 | 32 | 6th | — |
| 2022–23 | 4 – Šumadija-Raška | 26 | 16 | 8 | 2 | 47 | 19 | 56 | 2nd | — |
| 2023–24 | 4 – Šumadija-Raška | 25 | 13 | 5 | 7 | 55 | 34 | 44 | 3rd | — |
| 2024–25 | 4 – Morava Zone League | 26 | 8 | 7 | 11 | 36 | 45 | 31 | 9th | — |

== Notable players ==
This is a list of players who have played at full international level.

- (Serbia) Miljan Mutavdžić
- (Serbia) Miroslav Vulićević
- (Serbia and Montenegro) Đorđe Jokić

For a list of all FK Bane players with a Wikipedia article, see Category:FK Bane players.
