= FK FAP =

FAP
- Full name: FK FAP
- Nicknames: Kamiondžije (Truckers); Plavi Đavoli (Blue Devils)
- Founded: May 14, 1955; 71 years ago
- Ground: Priboj City Stadium
- Capacity: 10,000
- Chairman: Jovica Vasilić
- Manager: Igor Stojaković
- League: Serbian First League
- 2024–25: Serbian League West, 1st of 16
- Website: fkfap1955.com
Home colours	Away colours

FK FAP (Serbian Cyrillic: ФК ФАП) is a football club based in Priboj, Serbia. The name comes from Fabrika Automobila Priboj, shortened to FAP, which has historically been the largest Serbian automotive manufacturer of trucks and buses founded in 1953. Therefore, the team carries the nickname Kamiondžije which basically means Truckers. The team currently plays in Serbian First League, the second tier of Serbian football.

== Before FK FAP (1919–1954) ==
In 1919, a 50-year-old Czech doctor Bogoslav Šiler arrived to Priboj. As he was walking by the Lim river he has seen a group of boys playing with a ball made out of rags. He automatically had an idea to organize a Sports Society, and in 1922 Sports Society "Lim was formed. It had a football and music section. The playgrounds were built by people of Priboj, as a donation to the society.

According to the memory of Serbian Orthodox priest, Vasilije Petrović, and local retiree, Rasim Hasanagić, the first real ball was brought in Priboj by Aleksandar Nikolić, Branko Stikić and Mikan Mićević who were at the time the students in Sarajevo.

First game was played on August 18, 1922, against FK Polimlje and it ended in a 0–0 draw.

FK Lim fielded the following players:

Goalkeeper: Nikola Mazing
Defenders: Suljo Salkanović & Mikan Mićević
Midfielders Relja Matijević, Vaso Petrović & Ismet Hadžihamzić
Forwards: Salko Kurtović, Branko Stikić, Bata Nikolić, Salko Sukić & Lesko Ristić.

FK Lim continued to work under that name until 1954. FK Vatrogasac was formed afterwards but it was short lived.
Finally in 1955, FK FAP was founded.

== First years of FK FAP (1955–1970) ==
First, friendly game by FK FAP was played against FK Rudar Pljevlja in Pljevlja on May 14, 1955, and the game was lost with a result of 4–3 for the home team. FAP was represented on the pitch by: Zdravko Gazdić, Emin Šehić, Zahir Hulić, Murat Hasanagić, Behudin Šulović, Vejsil Hodžić, Fetko Bajrović, Mujica Salkanović & Kadro Džidić. The 1955 and 1956 seasons were played against Zlatibor District teams, in the latter the club achieved the promotion to Zone League Čačak-Užice, and then into Kragujevac Zone (3rd tier). Success followed in the 60's and in the following years the club competed continuously in Serbian League (also 3rd Yugoslav tier), until 1969/70 season when it ended up winning that competition and thus promoting to Yugoslav Second League.

== Promotion to the Yugoslav Second League and most successful period (the 70s) ==
FK FAP earned its first promotion to Yugoslav Second League by winning the 1969–70 Serbian League South. They competed in three consecutive seasons as a member of the Second League, their best performance was 8th in the 1971–72 season. Due to the change of the Yugoslav football system FAP was relegated, finishing 11th in the 1972–73 season (1st–9th were safe, 10th–18th were relegated), but came back to the Second League member for 1976–77 and stays for two more seasons.

== Yugoslav Second League – 2nd National Tier of SFR Yugoslavia ==
=== FK FAP in All-time Yugoslav Second League table 1947–1992 ===
Position	Club	Rep.	GP	W	D	L	GF	GA	Diff. +/-	Points
1	Borac Čačak	(Serbia)	992	376	280	335	1199	1055	-48	1010
71	FK Igman Konjic	(Bosnia and Herzegovina)	222	73	53	96	272	320	−48	199
72	Metalac Zagreb	(Croatia)	196	78	42	76	277	299	−22	198
73	FAP	(Serbia)	200	69	54	77	218	239	-11	192
74	Orijent Rijeka	(Croatia)	158	73	36	49	262	199	+63	181
75	Bokelj Kotor	(Montenegro)	216	62	53	103	218	375	−157	177
149	Zmaj Makarska	(Croatia)	30	1	2	27	17	96	−79	4

=== Seasons in Yugoslav Second League ===
Season	League	Final position	Cup	/
1970–71	Yugoslav Second League – East	12	–	
1971–72	Yugoslav Second League – East	8	–	
1972–73	Yugoslav Second League – East	11	–	Relegated
1976–77	Yugoslav Second League – East	10	–	
1977–78	Yugoslav Second League – East	13	–	Relegated

Note: According to the All-Time table it seems like one season in Second League is missing.

=== Seasons in Serbia as independent football association (2006–present) ===
Season	League	Pos.	Cup	/
2006–07	Morava Zone League	4	-	
2007–08	Morava Zone League	1	-	Promoted
2008–09	Serbian League West	12	-	
2009–10	Serbian League West	13	-	
2010–11	Serbian League West	15	-	Relegated
2011–12	Drina Zone League	10	-	
2012–13	Drina Zone League	-	-	

== Club honours and achievements ==
SFR Yugoslavia

- Yugoslav Third League / Yugoslav Inter-Republic League / Serbian League South / Serbian League East / Serbian League West
  - Winners (2): 1970, 1976
  - Runners-up (1): 1989

Serbia / Serbia & Montenegro

- Morava Zone League
  - Winners (2): 2003, 2008
  - Runners-up (1): 2006
- Serbian League West
  - Winners (1): 2024–25

=== Results by season (incomplete, needs contribution) ===
Season	League	Level	Position	/
2nd National Level / Tier
3rd National Level / Tier
4th National Level / Tier
1960–61	Kragujevac Zone	III	4	
1961–62	1 season unknown	–	–	
1962–63	Serbian League – Group A	III	8	
1963–64	Serbian League West – Subgroup A	III	9	
1964–1969	5 seasons unknown	–	–	
1969–70	Serbian League South	III	1	Promoted
1970–71	Yugoslav Second League East	II	12	
1971–72	Yugoslav Second League East	II	8	
1972–73	Yugoslav Second League East	II	11	Relegated
1973–1976	3 seasons unknown	–	–	
1976–77	Yugoslav Second League East	II	10	
1977–78	Yugoslav Second League East	II	13	Relegated
1978–1988	10 seasons unknown	–	–	
1988–89	Yugoslav Inter-Republic League East	III	2	
1989–1998	9 seasons unknown	–	–	
1998–99	Serbian League Morava	III	17	
1999–2000	Serbian League Morava	III	14	
2000–01	Serbian League Morava	III	N/A	Relegated
2001–02	Morava Zone League	IV	N/A	
2002–03	Morava Zone League	IV	1	Promoted
2003–04	Serbian League West	III	15	Relegated
2004–05	Morava Zone League	IV	3	
2005–06	Morava Zone League	IV	2	
2006–07	Morava Zone League	IV	4	
2007–08	Morava Zone League	IV	1	Promoted
2008–09	Serbian League West	III	12	
2009–10	Serbian League West	III	13	
2010–11	Serbian League West	III	15	Relegated
2011–12	Drina Zone League	IV	10	
2012–13	Drina Zone League	IV	-	
2024–25	Serbian League West	III	1	Promoted
2025–26	Serbian First League	II		

== Current squad ==
As of 6 April, 2026

Note: Flags indicate national team as defined under FIFA eligibility rules; some limited exceptions apply. Players may hold more than one non-FIFA nationality.

No.	Pos.	Nation	Player
1	GK	SRB	Danilo Golović
2	DF	BIH	Savo Šušić (dual registration with Javor Ivanjica)
3	MF	SRB	Miloš Divac
4	MF	SRB	Mirsad Miraljemović
5	DF	MNE	Ognjen Tripković (on loan from IMT)
6	MF	SRB	Žarko Bogdanović
7	DF	SRB	Nikola Obućina (on loan from Mladost Lučani)
8	FW	GHA	Bosiako Francis Antwi
9	FW	SRB	Petar Ristić
10	FW	ARG	Gastón Gerzel
11	DF	SRB	Aleksa Marković
12	GK	SRB	Nikola Tasić
13	FW	SRB	Martin Anđelković (on loan from Javor Ivanjica)
14	MF	SRB	Marko Otašević

No.	Pos.	Nation	Player
15	DF	SRB	Milan Tešanović
17	FW	SRB	Petar Šoškić
18	FW	NGR	Emmanuel Garuba
19	MF	SRB	Luka Lazarević
20	MF	BIH	Marko Šušnjar (on loan from Tekstilac Odžaci)
21	GK	SRB	Sava Prodanović
22	FW	SRB	Mario Marković
24	MF	POL	Radosław Wypart (on loan from IMT)
26	FW	SRB	Milan Mirosavljev (captain)
27	FW	CMR	Regis Baha
29	DF	SRB	Filip Antonijević
33	DF	BIH	Dražen Dubačkić
44	DF	SRB	Bogdan Milošević
55	DF	SRB	Damjan Daničić

=== Coaching staff ===
Position	Name
Manager	(Serbia) Igor Stojaković
Assistant manager	(Serbia) Dragan Vulević
Analyst coach	(Serbia) Slobodan Nikačević
Fitness coach	(Serbia) Filip Arsenijević
Goalkeeping coach	(Serbia) Zoran Stojanović
Doctor	(Serbia) Dušan Đerić
Physiotherapist	(Serbia) Branko Lazović
General secretary	(Serbia) Ivan Gudurić
Security commissioner	(Serbia) Gordana Penezić
