= FK Šumadija 1903 =

- Full name: Fudbalski Klub Šumadija 1903
- Founded: 14 September 1903; 122 years ago
- Ground: Stadion Bubanj, Kragujevac
- Capacity: 1,000
- League: Serbian League West
- 2024–25: Morava Zone League, 1st (promoted)
Home colours	Away colours

FK Šumadija 1903 (Serbian Cyrillic: ФК Шумадија 1903) is a football club in Kragujevac, Serbia. In 2009 was briefly merged with FK Radnički from Kragujevac and formed a new club named FK Šumadija Radnički 1923, but continued with the competition since 2010. As of the 2025/26 season, the club competes in the Serbian League West (third tier).

== History ==
Šumadija Football Club was formed on September 14, 1903, in Kragujevac. The club was formed by Danilo Stojanović, who was known as "Čika Dača". He was born in the nearby town of Lapovo in 1877. He loved football and had played it in Germany. When he moved to Kragujevac he worked in a school. He brought with him a football and taught the students how to play. He quickly formed two teams and the Šumadija Sports club. Training started in the local park but they needed their own training ground and a stadium. The answer lay adjacent to the park where there was a playing field which would be perfect for the newly formed club. On April 23, 1904, Šumadija played their first official match in front of a large crowd. The match was between Šumadija's first and second teams. The first team won 1:0.

Belgrade club SK Soko played their first game on the same day. The first match between these two clubs took place on July 10, 1905, in Kragujevac. Šumadija won the match 9:0, but the Belgrade side had their revenge when they were victorious 6:1 in Belgrade. Šumadija competed in red jerseys in their first competitive match. This was against Bačka who were from Subotica which was then under Austro-Hungarian rule. It was held in Belgrade and Šumadija won 10:3. On June 15, 1911, Bačka contacted Šumadija to arrange a friendly match in Subotica. The home team won 5:1. On November 13, 1911, BSK defeated Šumadija 8:1. This defeat was so demoralising that the club came very close to folding, but it was the words of "Čika Dača" that held everything together.

Football in Serbia had its major development from 1920 to 1941. From 1930 until the beginning of the Second World War, Šumadija competed in the Šumadijske župe and Kragujevac Football Subassociation leagues. During that time Šumadija finished in the top half of the table in most seasons and also played a number of friendlies throughout Serbia. They won the Kragujevac FS First League in 1932, 1933 and 1937. There was also a tournament held in Kragujevac which brought football clubs from all over Europe. Teams such as: Rapid Vienna, Nemzeti from Hungary and Levski Sofia. Three Serbian clubs participated. They were: Šumadija, FK Radnički Kragujevac and FK Slavija. Šumadija played as guests in Greece in 1928 against Aris and Iraklis. In Bulgaria in 1936, Šumadija played Levski Sofia, defeating them 1:0.

Before the war there were two big rivals in the town. Their rivalry had little to do with football, but more to do with politics. The clubs were divided into the main political ideologies that were common throughout the population; Šumadija was more oriented towards the Serbian monarchy while Radnički was the communist club. Radnički players were eating for free in the 'Moscow' tavern and wore red hats. Šumadija was an older club with more tradition. Šumadija's first stadium was claimed by Radnički as their own. The Šumadija staff, players and fans all declared themselves as Chetniks, and not many of them survived the war. The name Šumadija was eliminated until the early 1990s. Radnički was more successful than Šumadija during the time of Communist rule. In 1954 Šumadija merged with Mladi Radnik and grew in the Sports Association, forming more sports clubs under their name. Through much of this time the club competed in the lower leagues of Yugoslav football and won several tournaments. In 2001 new plans were being made to return to the top leagues in Serbian football, but till time, they still only managed to get to the third national level, the Serbian League West.

=== Recent league history ===
Season	Division	P	W	D	L	F	A	Pts	Pos
2020–21	4 - Šumadija-Raška Zone League	28	18	4	6	73	18	58	2nd
2021–22	4 - Šumadija-Raška Zone League	24	17	2	5	49	17	53	3rd
2022–23	4 - Šumadija-Raška Zone League	26	12	6	8	50	30	42	3rd
2023–24	4 - Šumadija-Raška Zone League	25	17	3	5	56	18	54	2nd
2024–25	4 - Morava Zone League	26	23	1	2	66	14	70	1st

== Honours ==
- Kragujevac Football Subassociation
  - Winner (3): 1932, 1933, 1937
- Šumadija Zone League
  - Winner (1): 2006–07
- Serbian Cup
  - Runner's up (1): 1914

== New Stadium ==
A new stadium has reached the planning stage. The east stand will hold up to 5600 people, the west 5600 and the north and the south stands will together hold around 2,600 capacity. The training ground will have a 3700 capacity.
