= Serbian Zone League =

- Country: Serbia and Montenegro (2002–2006); Serbia (2006–present)
- Confederation: UEFA
- Divisions: 10 (2002–2004); 13 (2004–2007); 9 (2007–2008); 7 (2008–2009); 8 (2009–2014); 10 (2014–2018); 11 (2018–2019); 12 (2019–2024); 11 (2024–)
- Level on pyramid: 4
- Promotion to: Serbian League
- Relegation to: Serbian District League
- Domestic cup: Serbian Cup
- Current: 2025–26

Serbian Zone League (Serbian: Зонска лига Србије / Zonska liga Srbije) is the fourth tier of football in the Serbian football league system, consisting of 11 divisions as of the 2024–25 season. The divisions are run by the four regional associations, namely Football Association of Western Serbia (three), Football Association of Eastern Serbia (four), Football Association of Vojvodina (three), and Football Association of Belgrade (one). The winner of each division gets promoted to one of the four Serbian League divisions (Belgrade, Vojvodina, East, and West), while other teams can qualify through post-season play-offs (as of 2025-26 season). In Belgrade top 2 teams qualify directly for the Serbian League Belgrade, and the 3rd placed team of the Belgrade Zone League plays against the lowest ranked team from Serbian League Belgrade that did not relegate directly, in a two-legged tie. In Western Serbia, three Zone League runners-up and the lowest ranked team from Serbian League West that did not relegate directly, are drawn into semi-finals and a final match, to determine which team will play in the Serbian League West and which 3 teams will play in their respective Zone Leagues. Hosts in both semi-finals and a final match are determined by draw, with the lower tier club having home court advantage. In Vojvodina, 2nd and 3rd placed teams in three Zone Leagues and two lowest ranked teams from the Serbian League Vojvodina that did not relegate directly, are drawn into 4 semi-final pairings and 2 final pairings, to determine which 2 teams will play in the Serbian League Vojvodina, and which 6 teams will play in the respective Zone Leagues.

== Divisions ==
=== Current ===
Football Association of Belgrade

- Belgrade Zone League (2002–present)

Football Association of Eastern Serbia

- Zone League Centre (2019–present)
- Zone League East (2014–present)
- Zone League South (2014–present)
- Zone League West (2014–present)

Football Association of Vojvodina

- Vojvodina League East (2004–2014, 2016–present)
- Vojvodina League North (2004–2008, 2016–present)
- Vojvodina League South (2004–2008, 2016–present)

Football Association of Western Serbia

- Drina Zone League (2009–2018, 2024–present)
- Dunav Zone League (2007–2018, 2024–present)
- Morava Zone League (2007–2018, 2024–present)

=== Defunct ===
Football Association of Eastern Serbia

- Niš Zone League (2002–2014)
- Pomoravlje-Timok Zone League (2007–2014)
- Pomoravlje Zone League (2002–2007)
- South Morava Zone League (2002–2007)
- Timok Zone League (2002–2007)

Football Association of Vojvodina

- Bačka Zone League (2014–2016)
- Banat Zone League (2014–2016)
- Novi Sad-Srem Zone League (2014–2016)
- Vojvodina First League (2002–2004)
- Vojvodina League West (2004–2014)

Football Association of Western Serbia

- Kolubara-Mačva Zone League (2018–2024)
- Moravica Zone League (2002–2007)
- Podunavlje-Šumadija Zone League (2018–2024)
- Podunavlje Zone League (2002–2007)
- Posavina Zone League (2002–2007)
- Šumadija-Raška Zone League (2018–2024)
- Šumadija Zone League (2002–2007)
- West Morava Zone League (2018–2024)
