= Kragujevac Football Subassociation =

The Kragujevac Football Subassociation (Serbo-Croato-Slovenian: Kragujevački loptački podsavez / Крагујевачки лоптачки подсавез) was one of the regional football governing bodies under the tutorial of the Football Association of Yugoslavia. It was formed on 20 December 1931.

It included initially the clubs from the municipalities of Kragujevac, Kraljevo, Jagodina, which were part of the Belgrade Football Subassociation, and a year later Čačak and Užice, which belonged to Sarajevo Football Subassociation were joined.

The presidents of the Kragujevac Football Subassociation were Bakić (1931–1932), Kosta Maršićanin (1932–1935) and Zoran Mišić (since 1935, reelected in 1937).

== Seasons and champions ==
These were the seasons and the champions of the Kragujevac FS First League:

- 1932: Šumadija 1903
- 1933: Šumadija 1903
- 1934: Slavija Kragujevac
- 1935: Radnički Kragujevac
- 1936: Radnički Kragujevac
- 1937: Šumadija 1903
- 1938: Radnički Kragujevac
- 1939: Radnički Kragujevac
- 1940: Jedinstvo Čačak
