= FK Sloga 33 =

Serbian football club

Sloga 33
- Full name: Fudbalski Klub Sloga 33
- Founded: 1933; 93 years ago 2016; 10 years ago (refounded)
- Ground: Stadion kraj Mlave, Petrovac na Mlavi
- Capacity: 4,000
- President: Milan Miladinović
- League: Braničevo District League
- 2024–25: Dunav Zone League, 13th of 14 (relegated)
- Website: Official
Home colours	Away colours

FK Sloga 33 (Serbian Cyrillic: ФК Слога 33) is a football club based in Petrovac, Serbia. They compete in the Braničevo District League, the fifth tier of the national league system.

== History ==
The club took part in the 1951 Yugoslav Cup, defeating Radnički Beograd 4–1 in the opening round. They met Partizan in the next phase and were defeated 15–0, as Stjepan Bobek scored eight goals for the Belgrade side.

After winning the Podunavlje Zone League in 2007, the club spent six seasons in the Serbian League West. They would finish as champions in the 2012–13 season to earn promotion to the Serbian First League, reaching the second tier for the first time in their history. In July 2016, the club withdrew from the competition due to financial reasons.

In the summer of 2016, the club was reformed and started off in the Braničevo District League, the fifth tier of Serbian football. They reached the Serbian League West in 2018, but suffered relegation in 2021.

They suffed back-to-back relegations in 2024 and 2025 to end up in the fifth tier for the 2025/26 season where they started with minus 9 points.

=== Recent league history ===
Season	Division	P	W	D	L	F	A	Pts	Pos
2020–21	3 - Serbian League West	34	14	7	13	38	36	49	11th
2021–22	4 - Podunavlje-Šumadija Zone League	30	14	2	14	51	44	44	7th
2022–23	4 - Podunavlje-Šumadija Zone League	26	20	4	2	67	17	52	1st
2023–24	3 - Serbian League West	30	6	8	16	34	62	26	14th
2024–25	4 - Dunav Zone League	26	5	4	17	28	64	19	13th

== Honours ==
- Podunavlje Zone League / Podunavlje-Šumadija Zone League (Tier 4)
  - 2006–07 / 2022–23
- Braničevo District League (Tier 5)
  - 2016–17

== Notable players ==
This is a list of players who have played at full international level.

- (Ghana) Francis Bossman
- (Serbia and Montenegro) (Serbia) Marjan Marković

For a list of all FK Sloga Petrovac na Mlavi players with a Wikipedia article, see Category:FK Sloga Petrovac na Mlavi players.

== Historical list of coaches ==
- (Serbia) Dragan Stajić
- (Serbia) Aleksandar Pantić
- (Serbia) Vladimir Stević (2009–2010)
- (Serbia) Dragojlo Stanojlović (2010)
- (Serbia) Aleksandar Petaković
- (Serbia) Jovo Simanić (2012–2013)
- (Serbia) Dragojlo Stanojlović (2013)
- (Serbia) Nenad Vanić (2013–2014)
- (Serbia) Dragan Đorđević (2014–2015)
- (Serbia) Dragan Aničić (2015)
- (Serbia) Dragan Đorđević (2015–2016)
- (Serbia) Zoran Govedarica (2016)
- (Serbia) Dragan Nedinić (2016–2017)
- (Serbia) Nenad Grozdić (2017)
- (Serbia) Dragan Nedinić (2017–2018)
- (Serbia) Zdenko Muf (2018)
- (Serbia) Gabrijel Radojičić (2019)
- (Serbia) Neško Milovanović (2019)
- (Serbia) Andrija Ferlež (2019–2020)
- (Serbia) Aleksandar Stojmirović (2020)
- (Serbia) Vladislav Rosić (2021)
- (Serbia) Zoran Vesović (2021)
- (Serbia) Saša Ranković (2021–2023)
- (Serbia) Zdenko Muf (2023)
- (Serbia) Nenad Trailović (2023–2024)
