= FK Mladi Radnik 1926 =

Mladi Radnik 1926
- Full name: Fudbalski klub Mladi Radnik 1926
- Nickname: Požarevljani (The People from Požarevac)
- Founded: 1926; 100 years ago, as SK Radnički
- Ground: Požarevac City Stadium, Požarevac
- Capacity: 3,500
- President: Vladan Šućurović
- Head coach: Novica Gajić
- League: Dunav Zone League
- 2024–25: Serbian League West, 13th (relegated)
- Website: https://fkmladiradnik1926.com/
Home colours	Away colours

Fudbalski klub Mladi Radnik 1926 (Serbian Cyrillic: Фудбалски клуб Млади Радник 1926) is a Serbian football club based in Požarevac. They play in the 4th-tier Dunav Zone League.

== History ==
FK Mladi Radnik was formed in 1926 and it was initially named SK Radnički. The oldest stored image of the club dates from 1927. In the spring of 1927, SK Radnički were officially included in the football league of Požarevac. Its first match was recorded on the August 2, 1927, when they played against FK Pobeda. Their first victory was recorded in September 1927, when they beat Hajduk by 2–1. Already under the name Mladi radnik the club joined the Football Association of Yugoslavia and started competing in 1928 in the Braničevo-podunavska regional League.

By the end of the 20th century the club was competing in the Second League of FR Yugoslavia. In 2004 they were relegated to the Serbian League East. After finishing among top places during the following three seasons, in the 2007–08 season they finished top of the league, thus starting an impressive ascension that will make them climb two levels in two years culminating in promotion to the Serbian SuperLiga. After spending one season in the SuperLiga competition, Mladi Radnik was relegated as the last-placed club to the lower level of the competition, the First League.

In 2016, the club became defunct due to financial reasons and a club named FK Radnički 1926 was founded which played as Mladi Radnik's successor. In July 2017, it was decided to return the original name and add the year of establishment, so the new club was named FK Mladi Radnik 1926. Due to a combination of strange circumstances and the expansion of the Serbian League West to eighteen clubs, Mladi Radnik received an invitation to fill the league and thus returned to the third rank of the competition after a three-year break.

== Recent league history ==
Season	Division	P	W	D	L	F	A	Pts	Pos
2020–21	3 - Serbian League West	34	14	8	12	33	33	50	10th
2021–22	3 - Serbian League West	30	10	8	12	26	29	38	10th
2022–23	3 - Serbian League West	30	9	6	15	39	52	33	10th
2023–24	3 - Serbian League West	30	9	10	11	39	41	37	9th
2024–25	3 - Serbian League West	30	11	5	14	35	37	38	13th

== Notable former players ==
For the list of all current and former players with Wikipedia article, please see: Category:FK Mladi Radnik players.

== Historical list of coaches ==
- (Serbia) Miloljub Ostojić (2008–June 2009)
- (Serbia) Nebojša Maksimović (June 2009–June 2010)
- (Serbia) Zoran Ranđelović (June 2010 – 2011)
- (Serbia) Vladimir Stević (July 2011 – 2012)
- (Serbia) Trivo Ilić (2012)
- (Serbia) Zdenko Muf (2013–2014)
- (Serbia) Vladimir Stević (2016–2017)
- (Serbia) Andrija Ferlež (2017–2019)
- (Serbia) Zdenko Muf (2019)
- (Serbia) Zarko Jovanović (2019–2021)
- (Serbia) Zoran Ranđelović (2021)
- (Serbia) Gabrijel Radojičić (2021–2023)
- (Serbia) Saša Ranković (2023)
- (Serbia) Vladimir Vlajović (2023)
- (Serbia) Novica Gajić (2023–2024)
- (Serbia) Vladimir Vlajović (2025–)
