= FK Železničar Lajkovac =

Železničar Lajkovac
- Full name: Fudbalski Klub Železničar Lajkovac
- Nickname: Želja
- Founded: 1927; 99 years ago
- Ground: Stadion Lajkovac
- Capacity: 1,700
- Chairman: Aleksandar Marković
- Manager: Saša Đenisić
- League: Serbian League West
- 2024–25: Drina Zone League, 1st (promoted)
Home colours	Away colours

FK Železničar Lajkovac (Serbian Cyrillic: ФК Железничар Лајковац) is a football club based in Lajkovac, Serbia. The club currently competes in the Serbian League West, in the 3rd tier of Serbian football.

== History ==
The club was formed in 1927 by the initiative of a group of important citizens of Lajkovac and was initially named Sport Klub Železničar (SK Železničar). The first matches took place only in 1929, when the first field was created. The chairman of the club was Aleksandar Drašković, who introduced football to the town and was also the club's main player initially. Since the owner of the field would not allow the tree on the halfline to be cut, the club had to move to a new field. But soon after the anecdotal event, the club settled on a new definitive field in 1933, when the new club president, Miroslav Marković, was already in charge. That year the club was registered in the Football Federation of Belgrade and qualified for the Kolubara county league.

Between 1934 and 1937, the club struggled to form a squad, but in 1938 it returned to competition. The locals remember with enthusiasm the train journeys they made to follow the team on their visiting matches. In the 1938–39 season, three players were called to represent the Kolubara county team: Miladin Ilić, Jakov Vidović and Dunda Kučenović. However, the best club player of this period was Stanko Milovanović, nicknamed Pop ('the priest'), who played at the higher level with multiple-time national champions Belgrade's SK Jugoslavija, and later for FK Partizan.

The Second World War marked a period when other town clubs were formed: Omladinac in 1943 and ŽAK in 1944. Broćić, the Yugoslavia national team member, played for the latter. During the war, Železničar was disbanded, but with the liberation of Yugoslavia in 1945 and by the initiative of the citizens of the town, the club was re-formed and merged with Omladinac, with all their players joining the club.

By the end of 1946 and beginning of 1947, the town underwent a sports revival. The Serbian Gymnastics Federation opened its branch in the town and a section dedicated to athletics named "Partizan" was founded. Železničar also formed sections dedicated to chess and handball. Many Serbian handball champions in 1947 were also footballers in the club. That year, the football club began competing from the beginning in the league of the sub-federation of Valjevo. The Serbian Gymnastics Federation led to a burgeoning sports and physical culture. School centers and clubs were modernized, and Železničar received a new field to develop. In this period, work with youth teams received special attention. In 1953 the club achieved promotion to the League of the Belgrade sub-federation. During the 1950s the club usually competed at this level, and the important players worth naming beside the club's top scorer Kalman Sabov and the captain Dr. Miodrag Banković, are Milorad Ivanović and Radomir Ilić. Since the 1960s until the breakaway of Yugoslavia, the club has mostly competed in the league of the sub-federation of Kolubara.

It is perhaps from the late 1990s until 2002 that the club achieved its maximum success by participating in the Second League of FR Yugoslavia. The participation of the club in national-level several consecutive seasons brought the club some prestige. But by the mid-2000s, the club fell to the lower leagues again, managing to return in 2007 to the Serbian League West (3rd national tier), a level that had been maintained for four consecutive seasons by 2011.

== Recent league history ==
Season	Division	P	W	D	L	F	A	Pts	Pos
2020–21	3 - Serbian League West	34	9	9	16	37	64	36	15th
2021–22	4 - Kolubara-Mačva Zone League	24	8	3	13	36	41	27	10th
2022–23	4 - Kolubara-Mačva Zone League	24	10	7	7	34	26	37	4th
2023–24	4 - Kolubara-Mačva Zone League	27	12	3	12	34	43	39	5th
2024–25	4 - Drina Zone League	24	20	3	1	61	11	63	1st

== Notable players ==
For the list of former and current players with Wikipedia article, please see: Category:FK Železničar Lajkovac players.

== External sources ==
- Official website
- Club Profile at Srbija Sport (in Serbian)
