= FK Jedinstvo Putevi =

Jedinstvo Putevi
- Full name: Fudbalski klub Jedinstvo Putevi Užice
- Nickname: Putari
- Founded: 1961; 65 years ago
- Ground: Stadion Krčagovo, Užice
- Capacity: 1,500
- Chairman: Ivan Karapetrović
- Manager: Ivan Janjić
- League: Serbian League West
- 2024–25: Serbian League West, 12th
Home colours	Away colours

Fudbalski klub Jedinstvo Putevi (Serbian Cyrillic: Фудбалски клуб Јединство Путeви) is a football club based in Užice, Serbia.

== History ==
In the 2011–12 season, they finished 1st in the Serbian League West and gained promotion to the Serbian First League (second tier).

At the end of the first part of the 2012–13 season, Jedinstvo found themselves in 4th position and eventual fight for promotion. In the end, they finished 6th in their first season in the Serbian First League. In the 2014–15 season, Jedinstvo took 14th place and was relegated to the Serbian League West. In the Serbian League West, they spent 3 seasons, and in the 2017–18 seasons, it took 18th place and was relegated to the West Moravian Zone. In the final season of 2018–19, Jedinstvo takes the 12th place and barely opposes in the league. The 2019–20 season of the club ends at position number 5, after the interruption of the league due to the situation with the COVID-19 virus.

Between 1991 and 2014, the club used to be supported financially by the Putevi company, hence the name. When Putevi stopped the funding, Jedinstvo decided to keep the name in the hope the company would help out again in the future.

Serbia national team defender (and later the captain of Manchester United) Nemanja Vidić started off his career at FK Jedinstvo Putevi together with his older brother Dušan Vidić.

== Recent league history ==
Season	Division	P	W	D	L	F	A	Pts	Pos
2020–21	4 - West Morava Zone League	28	19	4	5	8-	38	61	2nd
2021–22	4 - West Morava Zone League	26	15	3	8	75	38	48	3rd
2022–23	4 - West Morava Zone League	26	15	5	6	71	19	50	2nd
2023–24	4 - West Morava Zone League	25	20	2	3	67	19	62	1st
2024–25	3 - Serbian League West	30	12	2	16	36	36	38	12th

== Historical list of coaches ==
- (Socialist Federal Republic of Yugoslavia) Miodrag Terić (1960–64)
- (Socialist Federal Republic of Yugoslavia) Tomislav Mihailović (1967–71)
- (Socialist Federal Republic of Yugoslavia) Dragoljub Vitić (1971–72)
- (Socialist Federal Republic of Yugoslavia) Ljubomir Matović (1972–73)
- (Socialist Federal Republic of Yugoslavia) Miroslav Grgurević (1973–75)
- (Socialist Federal Republic of Yugoslavia) Dragoljub Vitić (1975–77)
- (Socialist Federal Republic of Yugoslavia) Ljubiša Milisavljević (1977–81)
- (Socialist Federal Republic of Yugoslavia) Dragan Šuljagić (1981)
- (Socialist Federal Republic of Yugoslavia) Miroslav Grgurević (1981)
- (Socialist Federal Republic of Yugoslavia) Dragan Šuljagić (1981–82)
- (Socialist Federal Republic of Yugoslavia) Slobodan Cerović (1982–86)
- (Socialist Federal Republic of Yugoslavia) Radivoje Aleksić (1986–89)
- (Socialist Federal Republic of Yugoslavia) Vladan Čumić (1989–93)
- (Federal Republic of Yugoslavia) Dragan Marjanović (1993–94)
- (Federal Republic of Yugoslavia) Slavoljub Dimitrijević (1994–97)
- (Federal Republic of Yugoslavia) Branko Čavić (1997–99)
- (Federal Republic of Yugoslavia) Slobodan Novaković (1999)
- (Federal Republic of Yugoslavia) Zoran Ristanović (1999-01)
- (Federal Republic of Yugoslavia) Radivoje Aleksić (2001–04)
- (Serbia and Montenegro) Slavoljub Dimitrijević (2004–06)
- (Serbia) Zdravko Đajić (2006–10)
- (Serbia) Radivoje Aleksić (2010)
- (Serbia) Ivica Tsvetanovski (2010-11.)
- (Serbia) Predrag Ristanović (2011–13)
- (Serbia) Ivan Janjić (caretaker) (2013)
- (Serbia) Sreten Avramović (2013–14)
- (Serbia) Nenad Markićević (2014–16)
- (Serbia) Goran Đukić (2016–17)
- (Serbia) Goran Ćosić (2017–18)
- (Serbia) Nebojša Panović (2018)
- (Serbia) Dragan Marjanović (2018–19)
- (Serbia) Ivan Janjić (2019–present)
