= Šumadija District League =

- Country: Serbia
- Number of clubs: 14
- Level on pyramid: 5
- Promotion to: Dunav Zone League
- Relegation to: Međuopštinska Liga Aranđelovac-Topola; Međuopštinska Liga Rača-Knić-Batočina
- Domestic cup: Serbian Cup
- Current champions: Šumadija Toponica (2024–25)

Šumadija District League (Serbian: Шумадијска окружна лига) is one of the District Leagues in the fifth tier of Serbian football. The league is operated by the Football Association of Serbia.

The league consists of 14 clubs from the Šumadija District which play each other twice (home and away) in a double round-robin league. At the end of the season the champion is promoted to the Dunav Zone League, one of the fourth tier leagues.

The league was formed in 2007 but was shut down, in 2018, lasting only 11 seasons. This was due to the reorganisation of the region’s fourth tier league by the Football Association of a Western Serbian region together with the Drina Zone and the Morava Zone, and four new zones were created in their place - West Moravian, Kolubar-Mačvan, Podunavsko-Šumadija and Šumadija-Raška. Most of the clubs that participated in the Danube Zone during the 2017/18 season were moved to the Danube-Sumadian zone.

== See also ==
- Serbia national football team
- Serbian Superliga
- Serbian First League
- Serbian League
- Zone Leagues
