= Drina Zone League =

- Founded: 2007; 2024 (re-established)
- Folded: 2018
- Country: Serbia
- Number of clubs: 12 (2025–present); 13 (2024–2025); 16 (2009–2018)
- Level on pyramid: 4
- Promotion to: Serbian League West
- Relegation to: Kolubara District League; Mačva District League; Zlatibor District League
- Domestic cup: Serbian Cup
- Last champions: Železničar Lajkovac (2024–25)

Drina Zone League (Serbian: Зонска лига Дрина / Zonska liga Drina) is one of the Serbian Zone League divisions, the fourth tier of the Serbian football league system. It is run by the Football Association of West Serbia.

Founded in 2009, the league was folded in 2018, together with the Dunav Zone League and Morava Zone League. Four new sections were established instead, namely Kolubara-Mačva Zone League, Podunavlje-Šumadija Zone League, Šumadija-Raška Zone League and West Morava Zone League.

In 2024 the league was re-established.

== Seasons ==
Season	Winner	Runner-up
2009–10	Sloga Bajina Bašta	Jedinstvo Užice
2010–11	Jedinstvo Užice	Loznica
2011–12	Krušik Valjevo	Budućnost Valjevo
2012–13	Loznica	Jedinstvo Ub
2013–14	Sloga Požega	Jedinstvo Ub
2014–15	FAP	Zlatibor Čajetina
2015–16	Zlatibor Čajetina	Provo
2016–17	Provo	Jedinstvo Ub
2017–18	Drina Ljubovija	Polimlje
2024–25	Železničar Lajkovac	Radnički Valjevo
