= Podunavci =

- Village (Selo)
- Location within Serbia
- Coordinates: 43°40′N 20°49′E
- Country: Serbia
- District: Raška District
- Municipality: Vrnjačka Banja

Area
  - Total: 7.48 km^{2} (2.89 sq mi)
- Elevation: 168 m (551 ft)

Population (2011)
  - Total: 1,502
  - Density: 201/km^{2} (520/sq mi)
- Time zone: UTC+1 (CET)
  - Summer (DST): UTC+2 (CEST)

Podunavci is a village in the municipality of Vrnjačka Banja, Serbia. According to the 2011 census, the village has a population of 1,502 people.
