= FK Radnički Klupci =

Radnički Klupci
- Full name: Fudbalski Klub Radnički Klupci
- Founded: 1948; 78 years ago
- Ground: Stadion, Klupci
- Capacity: 500
- Chairman: Dobrivoje Stojnić
- Manager: Duško Obradović
- League: Inter-municipal league "Jadar"
- 2024–25: Mačva District League, 14th (relegated)
Home colours	Away colours

FK Radnički (formerly FK Radnički Stobex, Serbian Cyrillic: ФК Раднички Стобекс) is a football club based in Klupci, Serbia. They spent the 2001–02 and 2002–03 seasons in the Second League of Serbia and Montenegro. The club also finished in second place in the third division in 2009, but lost the zonal promotion play-off to FK Radnički Sombor.

== Overview ==
The club's former name stems from their owners, the gravel company Stobex.

The club currently participates in the regional leagues, in the 6th-tier Inter-municipal league "Jadar" as of the 2025-26 season.

== Players ==
For the list of former and current players with Wikipedia article, please see: Category:FK Radnički Klupci players.

== Recent league history ==
Season	Division	P	W	D	L	F	A	Pts	Pos
2020–21	4 - Kolubara-Mačva Zone League	30	7	4	19	34	60	25	15th
2021–22	5 - Mačva District League	30	22	4	4	78	25	70	1st
2022–23	4 - Kolubara-Mačva Zone League	24	5	4	15	29	50	19	12th
2023–24	5 - Mačva District League	28	15	5	8	67	40	49 (Note: The club was docked one point.)	5th
2024–25	5 - Mačva District League	26	1	0	25	21	133	3	14th
