= FK Rudar Kostolac =

Rudar Kostolac
- Full name: Fudbalski Klub Rudar Kostolac
- Founded: 1933; 93 years ago
- Ground: Stadion, “Bora Beka”-Kostolac
- Capacity: 1,800
- Chairman: Nenad Stojčić
- Head coach: Novica Gajić
- League: Dunav Zone League
- 2025-6: Braničevo District League, 1st (promoted)
Home colours	Away colours

FK Rudar Kostolac (Serbian Cyrillic: ФК Рудар Костолац) is a football club based in Kostolac, Serbia. The club currently competes in the Dunav Zone League, in the 4th tier of Serbian football.

== History ==
Football started in the region with the beginning of the mining activity in the Klenovnik in 1933. At the end of the Second World War along with the creation of gymnastics society Rudar, the football section was formed as well. The football club is the older, most popular and most successful section of the sports society Rudar.

After its creation, the club competed in the football leagues of Belgrade district, Braničevo district, Posavlje-Podunavlje Zone League, First and Second Serbian League and Inter-Republic League North (one of the subdivisions of the Yugoslav Second League).

In the Cup, Rudar Kostolac was the district champion for 25 times, and participated in three occasions in the final tournament of the Yugoslav and Serbian Cup.

The club has won a number of tournaments among them the Minners Day of Serbia Tournament which is held in Kostolac. It also participates in a number of international tournaments in Poland, Czechoslovakia and Austria. Its first international match was played in 1948 against FK Avija from Prague.

The club has a renowned football school and a number of players have continued their careers in the domestic top league and abroad.

The club stadion holds the nickname of the former club president Borivoje Jovanović, Bora Beka.

=== Recent league history ===
Season	Division	P	W	D	L	F	A	Pts	Pos
2020–21	5 - Braničevo District League	32	24	5	3	114	20	77	1st
2021–22	4 - Podunavlje-Šumadija Zone League	30	5	2	23	28	73	17	15th
2022–23	5 - Braničevo District League	28	17	7	4	60	22	58	3rd
2023–24	5 - Braničevo District League	28	19	3	6	87	25	60	2nd
2024–25	5 - Braničevo District League	28	22	2	4	79	19	68	1st

== Players ==
For the list of former and current players with Wikipedia article, please see: Category:FK Rudar Kostolac players.
