= FK Polet Ljubić =

Polet Ljubić
- Full name: Fudbalski Klub Polet Ljubić
- Nickname: Grebići
- Founded: 1937; 89 years ago
- Capacity: 1,000
- League: Morava Zone League
- 2024–25: Serbian League West, 14th (relegated)
Home colours	Away colours

FK Polet Ljubić (Serbian Cyrillic: ФК Полет Љубић) is a football club based in Ljubić, Čačak, Serbia.

As of the 2025-26 season, Polet plays in the Morava Zone League, a fourth tier in Serbia's football league, and spent the 2001–02 season in the Second League of Serbia and Montenegro.

== Players ==
For the list of former and current players with Wikipedia article, please see: Category:FK Polet Ljubić players.

== Recent league history ==
Season	Division	P	W	D	L	F	A	Pts	Pos
2020–21	4 - West Morava Zone League	28	14	7	7	63	40	49	5th
2021–22	4 - West Morava Zone League	26	23	2	1	108	25	71	1st
2022–23	3 - Serbian League West	30	13	6	11	47	50	45	5th
2023–24	3 - Serbian League West	30	14	4	12	48	44	46	6th
2024–25	3 - Serbian League West	30	8	8	14	40	49	32	14th
