= Dunav Zone League =

- Founded: 2007; 2024 (re-established)
- Folded: 2018
- Country: Serbia
- Number of clubs: 12 (2025–present); 14 (2024–2025); 16 (2009–2018); 18 (2008–2009); 20 (2007–2008)
- Level on pyramid: 4
- Promotion to: Serbian League West
- Relegation to: Braničevo District League; Podunavlje District League; Šumadija District League
- Domestic cup: Serbian Cup
- Last champions: Đerdap Golubac (2025–26)

Dunav Zone League (Serbian: Зонска лига Дунав / Zonska liga Dunav) is one of the Serbian Zone League divisions, the fourth tier of the Serbian football league system. It is run by the Football Association of West Serbia.

Founded in 2007, the league folded in 2018, together with the Drina Zone League and Morava Zone League. Four new sections were established instead, namely Kolubara-Mačva Zone League, Podunavlje-Šumadija Zone League, Šumadija-Raška Zone League and West Morava Zone League.

In 2024 the league was re-established.

== Seasons ==
Season	Winner	Runner-up
2007–08	Loznica	Radnički Klupci
2008–09	Morava Velika Plana	Rudar Kostolac
2009–10	Partizan Bumbarevo Brdo	Seljak Mihajlovac
2010–11	Jasenica	Šapine
2011–12	Seljak Mihajlovac	Zvižd
2012–13	Šapine	Karađorđe Topola
2013–14	Zvižd	Karađorđe Topola
2014–15	Mihajlovac	Gruža
2015–16	Šapine	Gruža
2016–17	Proleter Vranovo	RSK Rabrovo
2017–18	RSK Rabrovo	Proleter Jalovik
2018–24	Part of Podunavlje-Šumadija Zone League	
2024–25	Mladi Radnik 1940	Đerdap Golubac
2025–26	Đerdap Golubac	Omladinac Šetonje
