= Morava Zone League =

- Founded: 2007; 2024 (re-established)
- Folded: 2018
- Country: Serbia
- Number of clubs: 12 (2025–present); 14 (2024–2025); 16 (2009–2018); 18 (2008–2009); 20 (2007–2008)
- Level on pyramid: 4
- Promotion to: Serbian League West
- Relegation to: Kragujevac First League; Moravica District League; Raška District League
- Domestic cup: Serbian Cup
- Last champions: Šumadija 1903 (2024–25)

Morava Zone League (Serbian: Зонска лига Морава / Zonska liga Morava) is one of the Serbian Zone League divisions, the fourth tier of the Serbian football league system. It is run by the Football Association of West Serbia.

Founded in 2007, the league was folded in 2018, together with the Drina Zone League and Dunav Zone League. Four new sections were established instead, namely Kolubara-Mačva Zone League, Podunavlje-Šumadija Zone League, Šumadija-Raška Zone League and West Morava Zone League.

In 2024 the league was re-established.

== Seasons ==
| Season | Winner | Runner-up |
|---|---|---|
| 2007–08 | FAP | Sloga Požega |
| 2008–09 | Šumadija Kragujevac | Šumadija Aranđelovac |
| 2009–10 | Polet Ljubić | Pobeda Beloševac |
| 2010–11 | Pobeda Beloševac | Mokra Gora |
| 2011–12 | Bane | Sloboda Grbice |
| 2012–13 | Jošanica | Mokra Gora |
| 2013–14 | Šumadija Kragujevac | Mokra Gora |
| 2014–15 | Mokra Gora | Tutin |
| 2015–16 | Jošanica | Sloboda Čačak |
| 2016–17 | Tutin | Radnički Kovači |
| 2017–18 | Jošanica | Takovo |
| 2024–25 | Šumadija 1903 | Jedinstvo Konjevići |
