= Serbian football league system =

League competition

The Serbian football league system is a series of interconnected leagues for association football clubs in Serbia. The system has a hierarchical format with promotion and relegation between leagues at different levels.

== Format ==
The number of teams promoted between leagues or divisions varies, and promotion is usually contingent on meeting criteria set by the higher league, especially concerning appropriate facilities and finances. The top two levels contain one league each. Below this, the levels have progressively more parallel leagues, which each cover progressively smaller geographic areas. The top two leagues are under direct jurisdiction of the Serbian Football Association. From the 3rd level on, divided geographically into 4 leagues, the leagues are under the jurisdiction of one of the 4 football association subdivisions, Belgrade, East, Vojvodina and West.

In the top of the pyramid is the Serbian SuperLiga containing 16 clubs from 2010–11 until 2025–26 season due to reduce from 16 to 14 in 2026–27 and 12 in 2027–28 onwards. Below the SuperLiga is found the Serbian First League containing 16 clubs. The last 4 are relegated into the Srpska Liga, the 3rd level, divided into 4 leagues Serbian League Belgrade, Serbian League East, Serbian League Vojvodina and Serbian League West every one of them containing 16 clubs except the Serbian League Belgrade (14 teams).

Until 2006 the clubs from Montenegro were also included, and the league's structure below and including 3rd level was slightly different because of it. The current Serbian league system is partially inherited from the pre-1992 Yugoslav league system, being back then the current 3rd tier, the Serbian League, unified and it was one of the 6 republic leagues forming the 4th level in the Yugoslav league pyramid, being under First and Second Federal League and Inter-republican Leagues.

Serbian SuperLiga was reduce from 14 to 12 from 2027–28 will four teams relegated to PrvaLiga, while two teams promoted to SuperLiga.

== Present system ==
Serbian SuperLiga; 14 teams (12 teams from 2027–28) The Champion & 2nd placed team qualifies for UEFA Champions League. 3rd placed team qualify for UEFA Europa League; 4th placed team qualify for UEFA Europa Conference League _{5th placed team has a chance to qualify for UEFA Europa Conference League depending on the Serbian Cup outcome.} 4 teams relegation for 2026–27
Serbian First League; 16 teams (14 teams and 12 teams from 2028 to 2029 and 2029–30) 1st & 2nd placed achieve direct Promotion to Serbian SuperLiga. 3rd placed plays a Promotion Play-Off against 14th placed team from Serbian SuperLiga. 4th placed plays a Promotion Play-Off against 13th placed team from Serbian SuperLiga. 6 teams relegation for 2026–27
Serbian League West; 16 teams Winner achieves Promotion to Serbian First League.			Serbian League East; 16 teams Winner achieves Promotion to Serbian First League.				Serbian League Belgrade; 14 teams Winner achieves Promotion to Serbian First League.	Serbian League Vojvodina; 16 teams Winner achieves Promotion to Serbian First League.		
Morava Zone League; 12 teams Winner achieves Promotion to Serbian League West.	Drina Zone League; 12 teams Winner achieves Promotion to Serbian League West.	Dunav Zone League; 12 teams Winner achieves Promotion to Serbian League West.	Zone League West; 12 teams Winner achieves Promotion to Serbian League East.	Zone League East; 12 teams Winner achieves Promotion to Serbian League East.	Zone League South; 12 teams Winner achieves Promotion to Serbian League East.	Zone League Centre; 12 teams Winner achieves Promotion to Serbian League East.	Belgrade Zone League; 14 teams 1st & 2nd placed achieve Promotion to Serbian League Belgrade.	Vojvodina League North; 16 teams Winner achieves Promotion to Serbian League Vojvodina.	Vojvodina League East; 16 teams Winner achieves Promotion to Serbian League Vojvodina.	Vojvodina League South; 16 teams Winner achieves Promotion to Serbian League Vojvodina.
Kragujevac First League; Moravica District League; Raška District League	Kolubara District League; Mačva District League; Zlatibor District League	Braničevo District League; Podunavlje District League; Šumadija District League	Rasina District First League; Pomoravlje District League	Bor District League; Zaječar District League; Pirot District League	Jablanica District League West; Jablanica District League East; Pčinja District League; Toplica District League	Nišava District League; Niš First League	Belgrade First League (Group A, Group B, Group C)	PFL Sombor; PFL Subotica	PFL Pančevo; PFL Zrenjanin	Novi Sad First League; Srem League
6-th tier Serbian Intermunicipal League (54 divisions)
7-th tier Serbian Municipal League (42 divisions)
Serbian Cup Cup Winner qualifies for UEFA Europa League. If the Cup Winner already became a Champion or is a 2nd placed team of Serbian SuperLiga then the 3rd placed team from Serbian SuperLiga gets the spot.

== Women ==
Until 2013 only two levels existed. For the 2013–14 season a new first level, called the Super Liga was created.

Level	League(s)/Division(s)	
1	Serbian Women's SuperLiga; 8 clubs The Champion qualifies Women's Champions League	
2	Serbian First Women's League; 8 clubs	
3	Serbian Second Women's League West	Serbian Second Women's League North
