= Serbian League West =

- Founded: 2003
- Country: Serbia and Montenegro (2003–2006); Serbia (2006–present)
- Number of clubs: 16
- Level on pyramid: 3
- Promotion to: Serbian First League
- Relegation to: Drina Zone League; Dunav Zone League; Morava Zone League
- Domestic cup: Serbian Cup
- Current champions: Metalac Gornji Milanovac (2025–26)
- Most championships: Radnički 1923 (3 titles)
- Website: fsrzs.com
- Current: 2025–26 season

Serbian League West (Serbian: Српска лига Запад / Srpska liga Zapad) is one of four sections of the Serbian League, the third tier of professional football in Serbia. The other three sections are Serbian League Belgrade, Serbian League East and Serbian League Vojvodina. It is also the highest regional league for the western part of Serbia.

The league was founded in 2003 following a merger between the Serbian League Dunav and the Serbian League Morava.

== Seasons ==
Season	Winner	Runner-up
Serbia and Montenegro
2003–04	Mladost Lučani	Sevojno
2004–05	Radnički Kragujevac	Sevojno
2005–06	Mladost Lučani	Metalac Gornji Milanovac
Serbia
2006–07	Metalac Gornji Milanovac	Morava Velika Plana
2007–08	Mladi Radnik	Sloga Kraljevo
2008–09	Sloga Kraljevo	Radnički Klupci
2009–10	Šumadija Radnički 1923	Mačva Šabac
2010–11	Sloga Kraljevo	Sloga Bajina Bašta
2011–12	Jedinstvo Užice	Rudar Kostolac
2012–13	Sloga Petrovac	Mladi Radnik
2013–14	Mačva Šabac	Polet Ljubić
2014–15	Loznica	Železničar Lajkovac
2015–16	Mačva Šabac	Budućnost Krušik
2016–17	Radnički 1923	Budućnost Krušik
2017–18	Zlatibor Čajetina	Sloga Požega
2018–19	Smederevo 1924	Sloga Požega
2019–20	Borac 1926	Sloga Požega
2020–21	Sloga Požega	Jedinstvo Ub
2021–22	Sloboda Užice	Sloga Požega
2022–23	Smederevo 1924	Borac 1926
2023–24	Borac 1926	FAP
2024–25	FAP	Metalac Gornji Milanovac
2025–26	Metalac Gornji Milanovac	Real Podunavci

== Members for 2026–27 ==
Locations of the 2026–27 Serbian League West clubs
1 Budućnost Krušik 2014
2 Đerdap
3 FAP
4 GFK Sloboda
5 Jedinstvo Putevi
6 OFK Napredak
7 Omladinac
8 Rađevac
9 Radnički
10 Real
11 Sloga
12 Šumadija 1903
13 Takovo
14 Vujan
15 Zlatibor
16 Železničar

The following 16 clubs compete in the Serbian League West during the 2026–27 season. Previous-season positions refer to the 2025–26 Serbian League West unless otherwise indicated.

Club	Place	Municipality	2025–26 position
Budućnost Krušik 2014	Valjevo	Valjevo	8th
Đerdap	Golubac	Golubac	1st (Zone Dunav)
FAP	Priboj	Priboj	15th (Serbian First League)
GFK Sloboda	Užice	Užice	6th
Jedinstvo Putevi	Užice	Užice	10th
OFK Napredak	Markovac	Velika Plana	11th
Omladinac	Zablaće	Čačak	5th
Rađevac	Krupanj	Krupanj	1st (Zone Drina)
Radnički	Valjevo	Valjevo	3rd
Real	Podunavci	Vrnjačka Banja	2nd
Sloga	Požega	Požega	13th
Šumadija 1903	Kragujevac	Kragujevac	9th
Takovo	Gornji Milanovac	Gornji Milanovac	12th
Vujan	Prislonica	Čačak	1st (Zone Morava)
Zlatibor	Čajetina	Čajetina	7th
Železničar	Lajkovac	Lajkovac	4th
