= Artigue =

- Commune
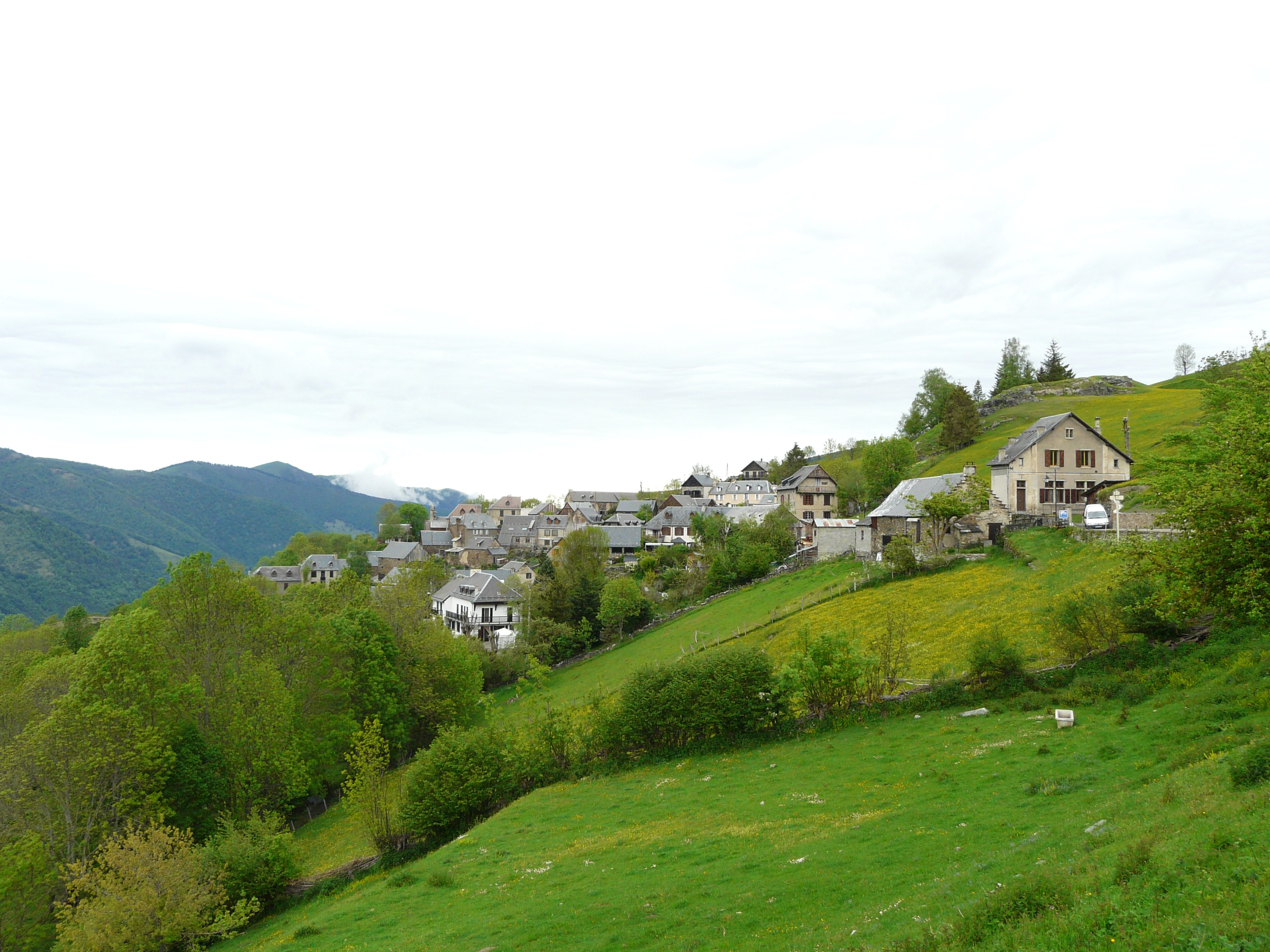
- A general view of Artigue

- Coat of arms
- Location of Artigue
- Location within France Location within Occitanie
- Coordinates: 42°49′59″N 0°37′14″E
- Country: France
- Region: Occitania
- Department: Haute-Garonne
- Arrondissement: Saint-Gaudens
- Canton: Bagnères-de-Luchon
- Intercommunality: CC Pyrénées Haut-Garonnaises

Government
  - Mayor (2020–2026): Marcel Cau
- Area^{1}: 9.72 km^{2} (3.75 sq mi)
- Elevation: 1,250 m (4,100 ft)
- Highest elevation: 2,081 m (6,827 ft)
- Lowest elevation: 840 m (2,760 ft)
- Population (2023): 36
  - Density: 3.7/km^{2} (9.6/sq mi)
- Time zone: UTC+01:00 (CET)
  - Summer (DST): UTC+02:00 (CEST)
- INSEE/Postal code: 31019 /31110
- ^{1} French Land Register data, which excludes lakes, ponds, glaciers > 1 km^{2} (0.386 sq mi or 247 acres) and river estuaries.

Artigue (French pronunciation: [aʁtiɡ]; Occitan: Artiga) is a commune in the Haute-Garonne department in southwestern France.

== Name ==
The pre-Latin word artica gave rise to the Gascon word artiga, a term which designates land cleared to make it cultivable.

In Occitan, the town is called Artiga.

== Geography ==
The commune of Artigue is located in the Haute-Garonne department, in the Occitanie, and borders Spain (Catalonia).

It is 109 km as the crow flies from Toulouse, the department's prefecture, 32 km from Saint-Gaudens, the sub-prefecture, and 5 km from Bagnères-de-Luchon, the central office for the canton of Bagnères-de-Luchon, on which the commune has depended for departmental elections since 2015. The commune is also part of the greater Bagnères-de-Luchon area.

The nearest communes are: Salles-et-Pratviel (1.2 km), Antignac (1.7 km), Sode (1.8 km), Moustajon (2.7 km), Gouaux-de-Luchon (2.7 km), Juzet-de-Luchon (2.7 km), Cier-de-Luchon (3.3 km), and Baren (4.1 km).

Historically and culturally, Artigue is part of the Comminges region, corresponding to the former County of Comminges, a district of the province of Gascony located in the present-day departments of Gers, Haute-Garonne, Hautes-Pyrénées, and Ariège.

Artigue borders three other French communes and, to the east, two Spanish municipalities. These neighboring municipalities are Bausen, Gouaux-de-Luchon, Les, Salles-et-Pratviel, and Sode.

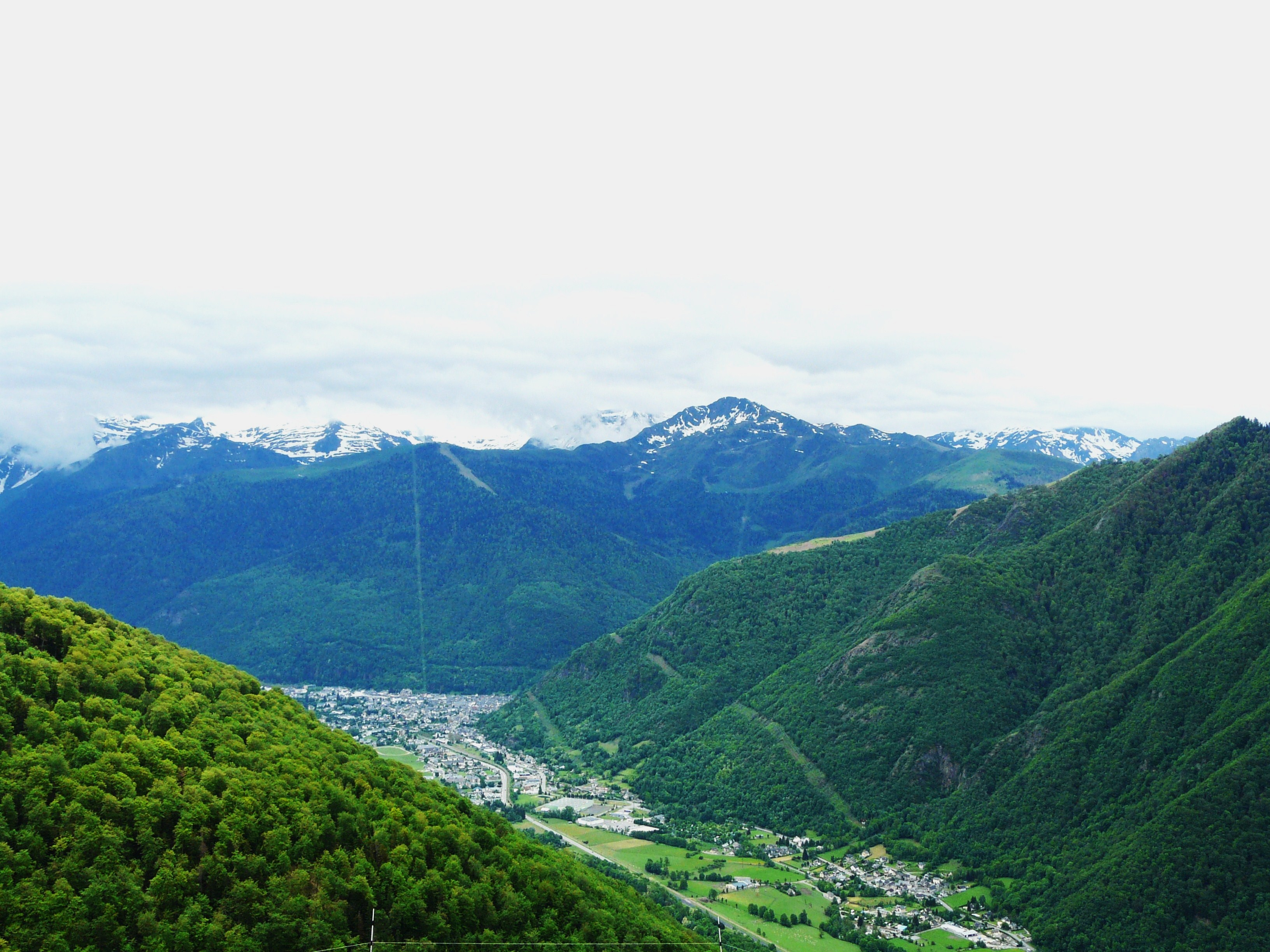
From Artigue, the panorama towards the Pyrenees and the Luchon valley.

== Local culture and heritage ==
- Church of Saint Peter and Saint Paul in Artigue. The church is believed to date from the 10th century.
- Viewpoint towards the Pyrenees mountain range and the Luchon valley.
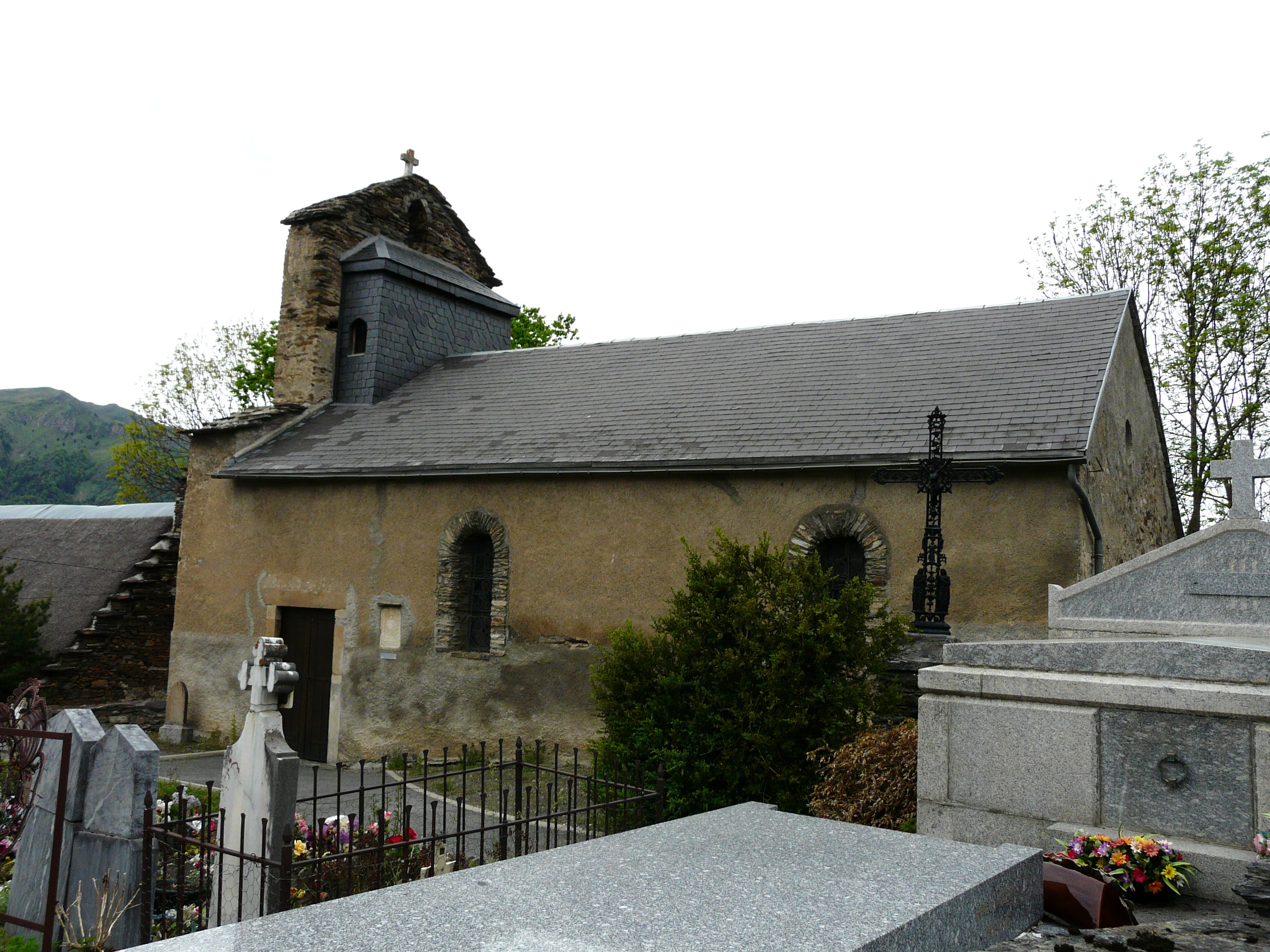
The church of Artigue.

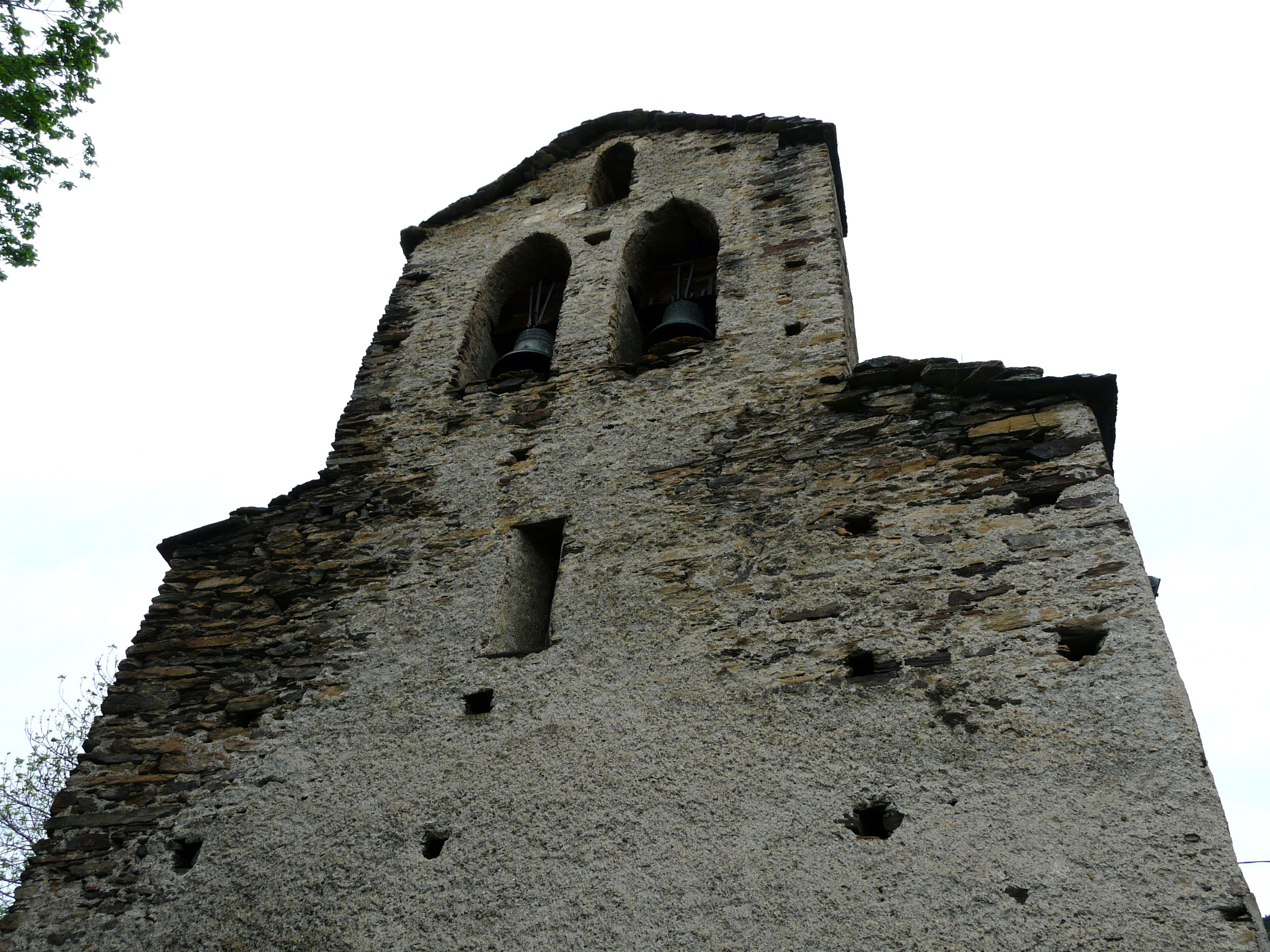
Its bell tower-wall.

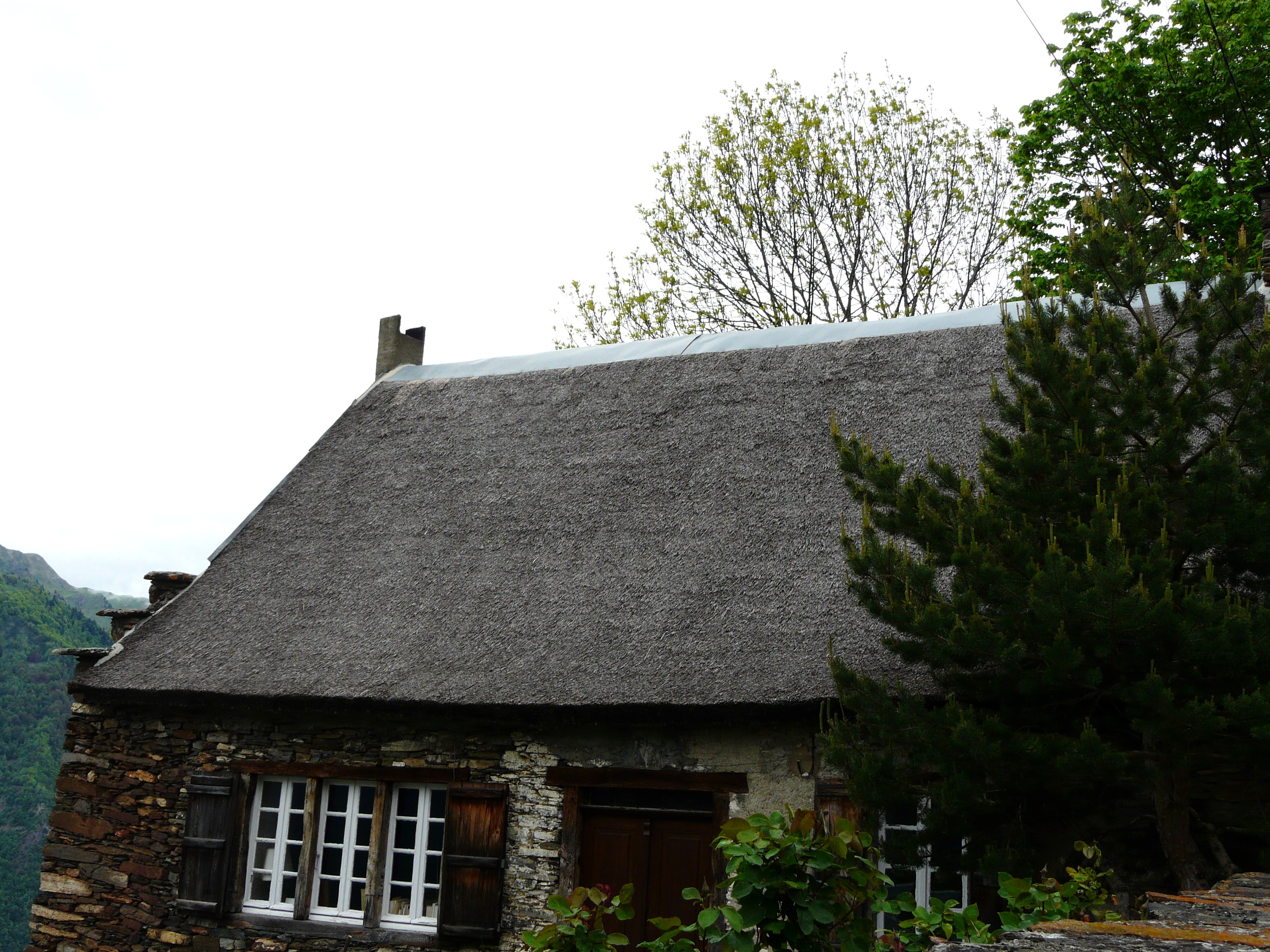
House with a thatched roof.

== Population ==
Historical population
Year	Pop.	±% p.a.
1968	31	—
1975	21	−5.41%
1982	20	−0.69%
1990	25	+2.83%
1999	34	+3.48%
2007	34	+0.00%
2012	32	−1.21%
2017	30	−1.28%
2023	36	+3.09%
Source: INSEE

== See also ==
- Communes of the Haute-Garonne department
