= Bossòst =

- Municipality
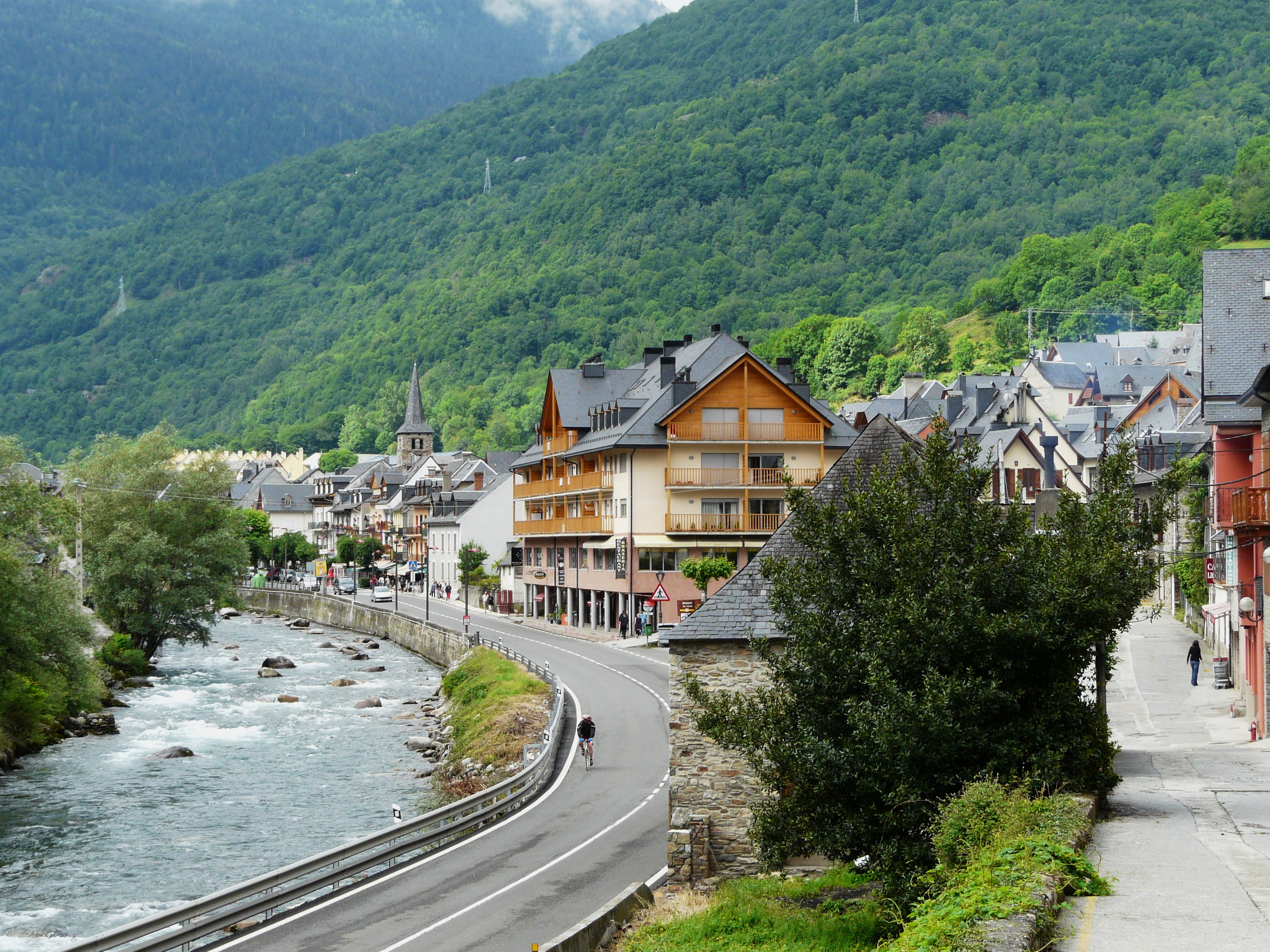
- The village of Bossòst, next to the Garona river.

- Flag Coat of arms

- Location in Aran

- Location in Catalonia Bossòst (Spain)
- Coordinates: 42°47′8″N 0°41′31″E
- Country: Spain
- Community: Catalonia
- Province: Lleida
- Entity: Aran
- Terçon: Quate Lòcs

Government
  - Mayor: Amador Marqués Atés (2015) (UA)

Area
  - Total: 28.2 km^{2} (10.9 sq mi)
- Elevation: 924 m (3,031 ft)

Population (2025-01-01)
  - Total: 1,189
  - Density: 42.2/km^{2} (109/sq mi)
- Time zone: UTC+1 (CET)
  - Summer (DST): UTC+2 (CEST)
- Postal code: 25550
- Official language(s): Occitan (Aranese), Catalan and Spanish
- Climate: Cfb
- Website: www.bossost.es

Bossòst (Occitan pronunciation: [buˈsɔs]) is a small Pyrenean village and municipality located in western Aran Valley, province of Lleida, Catalonia, Northern Spain. It has a population of 1,189 (register office, 2025). It is located in the terçon of Quate Lòcs.

Situated on the left bank of the river Garona, the village is bordered by the municipalities of Les, Vilamòs and Arres in Val d'Aran, as well as Bagnères-de-Luchon in France. The local football club, UE Bossòst, has the rare distinction of playing its regular matches in a foreign competition (it plays in the French minor leagues).
