= List of association football clubs playing in the league of another country =

This is a list of association football clubs playing in the league of another country i.e. a country other than the one where they are based.

== Premise ==
Conditions for competing in a "foreign" league, as well as in a continental/confederational competition, are set case-by-case by FIFA, the international association football federation, as well as the respective continental confederations and national football associations involved.

Clubs that are located in defunct nations that merged with others, or new nations separated from others, or which stopped competing in a nation's league system because their location was transferred to another nation, are not included in this article.

== United Kingdom ==
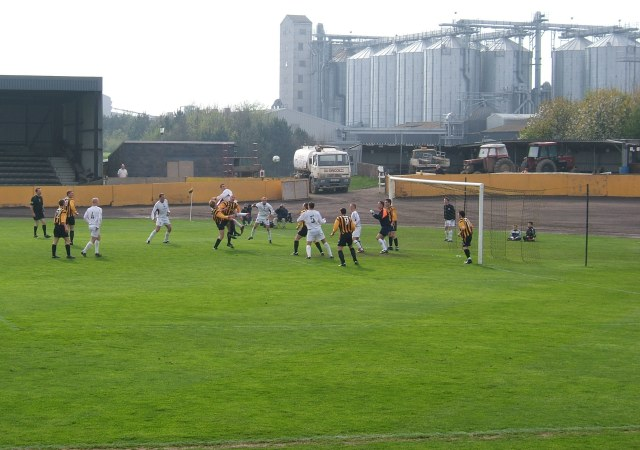
Shielfield Park, home of Berwick Rangers, an English club playing in Scotland's national leagues

As a result of the history of football in the United Kingdom, the United Kingdom has four FIFA member countries instead of one. Therefore, clubs that play outside what would be regarded as their 'home country' are included.

Clubs from Bermuda are included in the Americas section of the article.

=== Akrotiri and Dhekelia ===
Clubs based in Akrotiri and Dhekelia play in the league system of Cyprus.

=== Wales ===
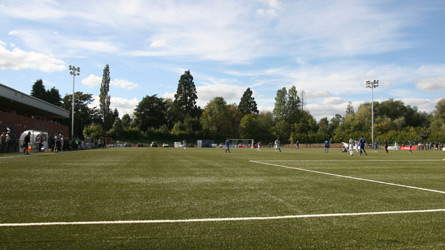
The New Saints of the Welsh Premier League play at Park Hall in the English town of Oswestry

Cardiff City reached the FA Cup final in 2008, prompting the English FA to change the rules to allow Welsh clubs to represent England in UEFA competitions should they qualify to do so.

Then Swansea City won the 2012–13 Football League Cup, and are the first Wales-based club to qualify through the English system.

Merthyr Town F.C. is under the jurisdiction of the Football Association of Wales for disciplinary and administration purposes. Cardiff City, Swansea City, Wrexham, and Newport County previously had the same governance until an arrangement was made with the English FA for the 2011–12 season onwards which sees Welsh clubs playing in the top four divisions of English football under the governance of the English FA.

Liverpool Reserves have played home matches at the Deva Stadium mentioned below and also the Racecourse Ground, home of Wrexham AFC.

Deva Stadium, home of Chester FC and previously Chester City, is located almost entirely in Wales. However, the club is still listed as based in England.

=== Crown Dependencies ===
The Guernsey Football Association, Jersey Football Association, and the Isle of Man Football Association have no international recognition; they have county status within the English Football Association.

=== Table of clubs ===
List of clubs
| Club | League system | Period | Current/Last League | Details |
|---|---|---|---|---|
| (England) Berwick Rangers | (Scotland) Scottish football league system | 1951–present | Scottish Lowland League | |
| (England) Tweedmouth Rangers | (Scotland) Scottish football league system | 2016–present | East of Scotland Third Division | |
| (Scotland) Annan Athletic | (England) English football league system | 1952–1977 | SPFL League Two | |
| (Scotland) Gretna | (England) English football league system | 1947–2002 | Scottish Premier League | Defunct; 2008 |
| (Wales) Cardiff City | (England) English football league system | 1920–present | EFL Championship | |
| (Wales) Swansea City | (England) English football league system | 1920–present | EFL Championship | |
| (Wales) Wrexham | (England) English football league system | 1921–present | EFL Championship | Reserves played in Wales second tier until 1995 |
| (Wales) Newport County | (England) English football league system | 1920–present | EFL League Two | |
| (Wales) Merthyr Town F.C | (England) English football league system | 2010–present | National League North | |
| (Wales) Caernarfon Town | (England) English football league system | 1992–1995 | Cymru Premier | |
| (Wales) Barry Town | (England) English football league system | 1992–1993 | Cymru Premier | |
| (Wales) Colwyn Bay | (England) English football league system | 1992–2019 | Cymru Premier | |
| (Wales) Merthyr Tydfil F.C. | (England) English football league system | 1992–2010 | Southern League Premier Division | Defunct; 2010 |
| Guernsey F.C. | (England) English football league system | 2011–present | Southern Combination Premier Division | |
| Jersey Bulls F.C. | (England) English football league system | 2018–present | Isthmian League South Division | |
| F.C. Isle of Man | (England) English football league system | 2019–present | North West Counties League Premier Division | |
| (England) The New Saints | (Wales) Welsh football league system | 1992–present | Cymru Premier | Previously they played in the Welsh village of Llansantffraid-ym-Mechain, and in 2010 were planning on playing in Chester. |
| (England) Newcastle (Shropshire) | (Wales) Welsh football league system | 1992–present | Montgomeryshire Amateur League | |
| (England) Trefonen | (Wales) Welsh football league system | 1992–present | Montgomeryshire Amateur League | |
| (England) Bishop's Castle Town | (Wales) Welsh football league system | 1992–2010; 2016–present | Central Wales League Northern Division | |
| (England) Morda United | (Wales) Welsh football league system | 1992–1994; 2014–2017 | Shropshire County Premier Division | Folded; 2018, Reformed; 2020, Folded; 2025 |
| (England) Llanymynech | (Wales) Welsh football league system | 2011–2022 | Shropshire County Premier Division | |
| (England) Clun Valley F.C. | (Wales) Welsh football league system | 1992–1996 | Mid-Wales League | Defunct; 1996 |
| (England) Bucknell F.C. | (Wales) Welsh football league system | 1992–2015 | Shropshire County Premier Division | Defunct; 2015 |
| (England) Chirk Town F.C. | (Wales) Welsh football league system | 2019–2022 | North East Wales League Premier Division | Defunct; 2022 |
| (England) Oswestry Town | (Wales) Welsh football league system | 1993–2003 | Welsh Premier League | Merged with Total Network Solutions, later The New Saints; 2003 |

== Continental Europe ==
=== Table of clubs ===
| Club | League system | Current / last league | Period | Details |
|---|---|---|---|---|
| (Northern Ireland) Derry City | (Republic of Ireland) Irish football league system | League of Ireland Premier Division | 1985–present | They previously played in the Irish League from 1928 to 1972. They have won the title in Northern Ireland in 1964–65 and in the Republic of Ireland twice - 1988–89 and 1996–97. |
| FC Andorra | (Spain) Spanish football league system | Segunda División | 1942–present | |
| (Austria) SV Kleinwalsertal | (Germany) German football league system | B-Klasse Allgäu 8 | 1960s - present | |
| (Bosnia and Herzegovina) FK Borac Banja Luka | (Federal Republic of Yugoslavia) Yugoslav football league system | Premier League of Bosnia and Herzegovina | 1992 - 1995 | Technically, the club stayed Yugoslav and continued to participate in Yugoslav competition until 1995, despite Bosnia and Herzegovina having been recognised as independent in 1992. |
| (Cyprus) Olympiakos Nicosia | (Greece) Greek football league system | | 1967 – 68, 1969 – 70, 1971 – 72 | From 1967 to 1974, the champion of the Cypriot First Division was promoted to the Greek First Division. |
| (Cyprus) AEL Limassol | (Greece) Greek football league system | | 1968 – 69 | From 1967 to 1974, the champion of the Cypriot First Division was promoted to the Greek First Division. |
| (Cyprus) EPA Larnaca FC | (Greece) Greek football league system | | 1970 – 71 | From 1967 to 1974, the champion of the Cypriot First Division was promoted to the Greek First Division. |
| (Cyprus) AC Omonia | (Greece) Greek football league system | | 1972 – 73 | From 1967 to 1974, the champion of the Cypriot First Division was promoted to the Greek First Division. |
| (Cyprus) APOEL F.C. | (Greece) Greek football league system | | 1973 – 74 | From 1967 to 1974, the champion of the Cypriot First Division was promoted to the Greek First Division. |
| (Finland) IF Fram | (Sweden) Swedish football league system | | 1999 – 2011 | All clubs are based in Åland, an autonomous region of Finland with an ethnic Swedish population. Clubs from Åland Play in both The Swedish and Finnish systems. |
| (Finland) IF Östernäskamraterna | (Sweden) Swedish football league system | | 2004 – 2007 | All clubs are based in Åland, an autonomous region of Finland with an ethnic Swedish population. Clubs from Åland Play in both The Swedish and Finnish systems. |
| (Finland) Eckerö IF | (Sweden) Swedish football league system | | 2005 – 2009 | All clubs are based in Åland, an autonomous region of Finland with an ethnic Swedish population. Clubs from Åland Play in both The Swedish and Finnish systems. |
| (Finland) Jomala IK | (Sweden) Swedish football league system | | 2000 – 2005 | All clubs are based in Åland, an autonomous region of Finland with an ethnic Swedish population. Clubs from Åland Play in both The Swedish and Finnish systems. |
| (Finland) IF Finströms Kamraterna | (Sweden) Swedish football league system | | 2002 – 2003 | All clubs are based in Åland, an autonomous region of Finland with an ethnic Swedish population. Clubs from Åland Play in both The Swedish and Finnish systems. |
| (Finland) IF Start | (Sweden) Swedish football league system | | 2004 | All clubs are based in Åland, an autonomous region of Finland with an ethnic Swedish population. Clubs from Åland Play in both The Swedish and Finnish systems. |
| (Finland) Lemlands IF | (Sweden) Swedish football league system | | 2011 – 2021 | All clubs are based in Åland, an autonomous region of Finland with an ethnic Swedish population. Clubs from Åland Play in both The Swedish and Finnish systems. |
| (Finland) Hammarlands IK | (Sweden) Swedish football league system | | 2014 – 2023 | All clubs are based in Åland, an autonomous region of Finland with an ethnic Swedish population. Clubs from Åland Play in both The Swedish and Finnish systems. |
| (Russia) Volna Kaliningrad | (Lithuania) Lithuanian League system | | 2000 – 2001 | Folded |
| (Germany) FC Büsingen | (Switzerland) Swiss Football League | 4. Liga – Group 5 | 1924–present | Büsingen am Hochrhein is a German exclave surrounded by Switzerland. |
| (Italy) AP Campionese | (Switzerland) Swiss Football League | 5. Liga – Group 1 | 1978–present | Campione d'Italia is an Italian exclave surrounded by Switzerland. The club did not compete during the COVID pandemic. |
| (Switzerland) FC Chiasso | (Italy) Italian football league system | | 1914 - 1923 | |
| San Marino Calcio | (Italy) Italian football league system | Serie D | 2021–present | The home league of San Marino was established only in 1985. Before that year, other Sammarinese teams have competed in the Italian system, though only San Marino Calcio was allowed to take part in the system and also to Coppa Italia exclusively. |
| (Liechtenstein) FC Balzers | (Switzerland) Swiss Football League | | All clubs in Liechtenstein play in the Swiss Football League system, as Liechtenstein has no properly recognized league of its own. These clubs also compete in the Liechtenstein Football Cup, which is effectively the championship of Liechtenstein, with the winners representing Liechtenstein in the corresponding UEFA club competition (the Cup Winners’ Cup through the 1998–99 season, thereafter the UEFA Cup/UEFA Europa League through the 2020–21 season, and currently the UEFA Europa Conference League). The cup winners are the only club representing Liechtenstein in Europe, as without a league they do not have a club in the UEFA Champions League. Liechtenstein clubs also do not play in the Swiss Cup, and are not eligible for qualification to European competitions via the Swiss league system. | |
| (Liechtenstein) USV Eschen/Mauren | (Switzerland) Swiss Football League | | | |
| (Liechtenstein) FC Ruggell | (Switzerland) Swiss Football League | | | |
| (Liechtenstein) FC Schaan | (Switzerland) Swiss Football League | | | |
| (Liechtenstein) FC Triesen | (Switzerland) Swiss Football League | | | |
| (Liechtenstein) FC Triesenberg | (Switzerland) Swiss Football League | | | |
| (Liechtenstein) FC Vaduz | (Switzerland) Swiss Football League | | 1932–present | FC Vaduz has had three stints in the top flight in Switzerland so far: the first in the 2008–09 season, the second running from 2014 to 2017, and the third in 2020–21. After winning the Swiss Challenge League in the 2025-2026 season, they will play their fourth stint beginning in the 2026-2027 season. They are the only Liechtenstein club to have ever played in the Swiss Super League. In the 2022–23 UEFA Europa Conference League, they qualified for the group stage, becoming the first team from Liechtenstein to play in the group stage of a UEFA club competition. |
| AS Monaco FC | (France) French football league system | Ligue 1 | 1933–present | Monaco does not have a professional league and the Monégasque Football Federation, which has no international recognition, was not formed until 2000. They are one of the most successful clubs in France having won eight Ligue 1, five Coupe de France and one Coupe de la Ligue titles, and have also represented France in European competitions, reaching the final of the now-defunct UEFA Cup Winners' Cup in 1992 and of the UEFA Champions League in 2004. |
| (Spain) UE Bossòst | (France) French football league system | Occitanie League, Haute-Garonne District, D2 | 1927–present | In the first years of the team, they could not cross to the other side of the valley because of the snow, for this reason the football team of the Aran Valley plays in France. In fact, until they built the Vielha tunnel, they could not cross into Catalan territory during the winter. |
| (Saarland) 1. FC Saarbrücken | (France) French football league system | French Div 2 | 1947/48 | |

=== Transnistria ===
(Transnistria) → : Transnistrian in Moldova

Transnistria is a break away state that does not operate its own league system

- FC Sheriff Tiraspol

=== Kosovo ===
→ : Kosovar in Serbia
Kosovo is still only a partially recognised state and the government of Serbia still claims the territory as its own.

Due to Serbian refusal of Kosovo institutions, Serbs in North Kosovo act independently in sport. For example, the Football First League of North Kosovo was primarily formed of Serbian clubs from four of North Kosovo's municipalities. Both governments agreed upon creating a Community of Serb Municipalities.

In 2016, Kosovo became the 55th member of UEFA, and therefore Football Federation of Kosovo's Football Superleague of Kosovo became a recognised independent league.

From 2010 to 2015, the Football First League of North Kosovo was the top football regional league in North Kosovo, ranked fifth in the Serbian league system. The league was formed primarily of Serbian football clubs that come from four of North Kosovo's municipalities such as Leposavić, Zvečan, Zubin Potok and Northern Kosovska Mitrovica.

The league was formed in protest to the establishment of the Kosovo Super League by the Republic of Kosovo; the Serbian clubs from North Kosovo refuse to enter the Republic of Kosovo's institutions as per the Assembly of the Community of Municipalities of the Autonomous Province of Kosovo and Metohija.

- FK Ibar Leposavić
- FK Kopaonik Lešak
- FK Moša Banje
- FK Rudar Kosovska Mitrovica
- FK Zvečan
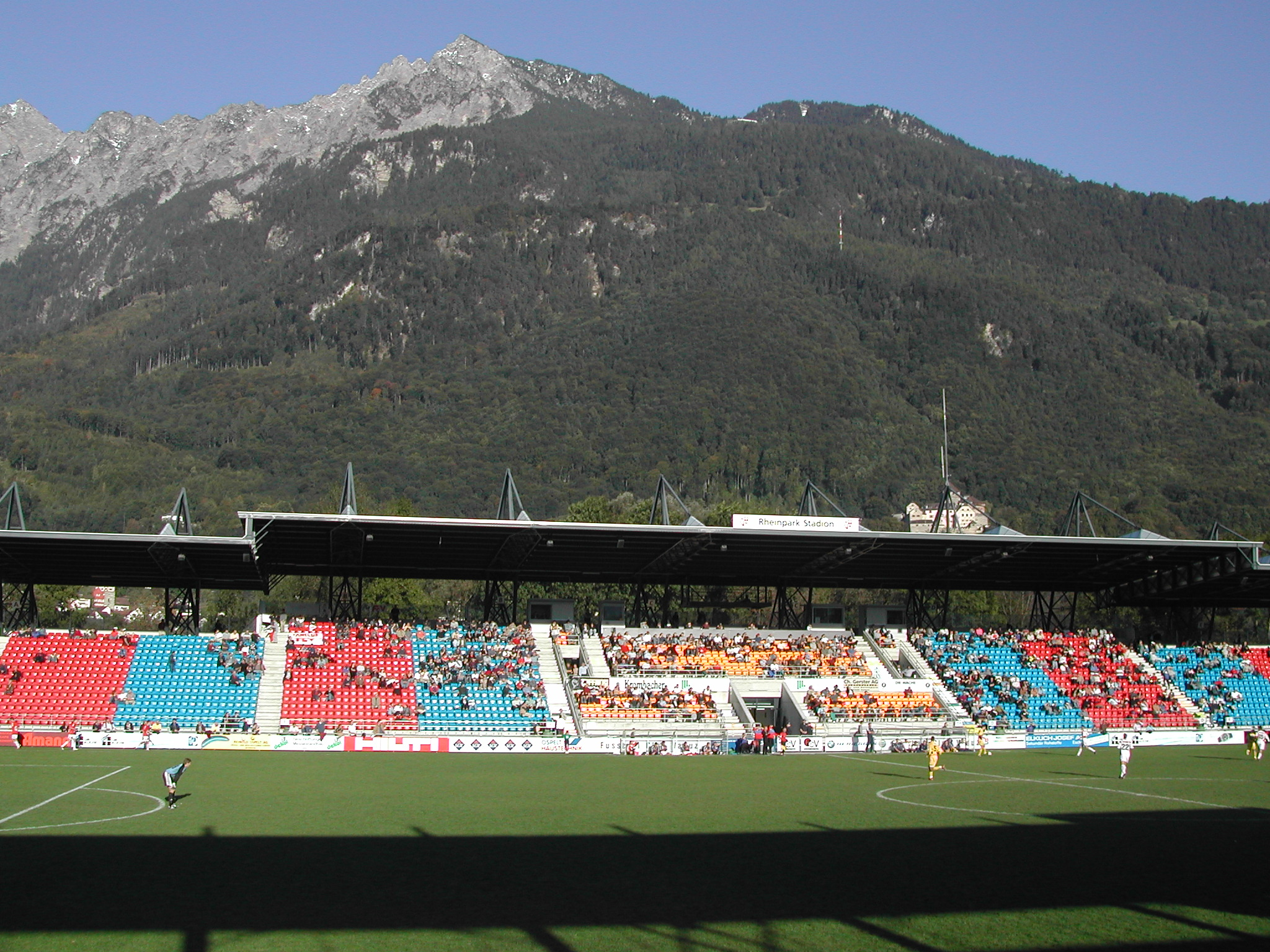
  Rheinpark Stadion, home of FC Vaduz, the only Liechtensteiner team to have ever played top-flight football in Switzerland
- FK Radnik Prilužje (until 2013)
- FK Sočanica (until 2014)

There are two other clubs from North Kosovo, which compete in different leagues:

- FK Mokra Gora plays in the national Serbian League West
- FK Trepča play in the Morava Zone League

=== Ukraine ===
(Ukraine) ( (Autonomous Republic of Crimea) ) → : Ukrainian in Russia

- FC SKChF Sevastopol (reconstituted based on FC Sevastopol)
- FC TSK Simferopol (reconstituted based on SC Tavriya Simferopol)
- FC Zhemchuzhina Yalta (revived based on same club that was disqualified from Ukrainian competitions)

The three clubs are from Crimea, a territory recognized by Ukraine and a majority of countries as part of Ukraine, but have been under effective Russian control as the Republic of Crimea since the annexation of Crimea by the Russian Federation.

FC Sevastopol and SC Tavriya Simferopol last played in the 2013–14 Ukrainian Premier League, and were dissolved after the completion of the season. The three clubs were reformed as football organizations of the Russian Federation and joined the Russian Professional Football League starting from the 2014–15 season, after approval from the Russian Football Union.

The inclusion of Crimean clubs in Russian competitions have not been approved by either FIFA or UEFA, and the Football Federation of Ukraine have lodged a complaint.

On 22 August 2014, UEFA decided "that any football matches played by Crimean clubs organised under the auspices of the Russian Football Union will not be recognised by UEFA until further notice", and on 4 December 2014, decided to prohibit Crimean clubs to play in competitions organised by the Russian Football Union as from 1 January 2015 and for the region to be considered as a "special zone" for football purposes until further notice. In 2023 Crimean clubs began playing in the Russian system again, despite being a UEFA "special zone".

== Africa ==
| Club | League system | Current / last league | Details |
|---|---|---|---|
| (Western Sahara) JS Massira | (Morocco) Moroccan football league system | Botola 2 | JS Massira is from the city of El Aaiún in the territory that the Sahrawi Arab Democratic Republic claims but does not hold |
| (Sudan) Al-Hilal S.C. | (Rwanda) Rwandan football league system | Rwanda Premier League | Temporary relocation due to the Sudanese civil war. The two clubs competed in Mauritania's Super D1 during the 2024-25 season. |
| (Sudan) Al-Merrikh SC | (Rwanda) Rwandan football league system | Rwanda Premier League | Temporary relocation due to the Sudanese civil war. The two clubs competed in Mauritania's Super D1 during the 2024-25 season. |

== Americas ==
Many North American sports leagues are made up of teams from different countries—three of the four largest professional leagues have teams representing cities on both sides of the U.S.-Canada border. The same is true for soccer leagues. Although foreign clubs can and do participate in leagues based in the United States, no such team is eligible to participate in the U.S. Open Cup, which is only open to teams affiliated with the United States Soccer Federation (U.S. Soccer).

Previously, Canadian teams playing in Major League Soccer (MLS) were not eligible to qualify for the CONCACAF Champions League through the MLS regular season or playoffs; their only method of qualification was through the Canadian Championship, the cup competition run by the Canadian Soccer Association. However, starting from the 2023 MLS season, Canadian teams can qualify for the expanded 2024 CONCACAF Champions League through the MLS regular season or playoffs, or through the Leagues Cup, a competition run by MLS and Liga MX.

Those teams that do participate in U.S. leagues also participate in various competitions under their local federations to gain entry into the Champions League and the now defunct CONCACAF League.

| Club | Current / last league | Period | Details |
|---|---|---|---|
| (Antigua and Barbuda) Antigua Barracuda FC | USL Championship | 2011 - 2013 | The team was forced to play its entire 2013 schedule on the road due to issues with its home stadium, normally a cricket ground, and folded after that season. |
| Bermuda Hogges | USL League Two | 2006 - 2013 | The team began as a member of the USL Second Division (the effective predecessor to today's USL Championship), but self-relegated to the PDL after the 2009 season. Many of the players appeared for the Bermuda national team. The club folded after the 2013 PDL season. |
| FC Bascome Bermuda | USL League Two | Unknown | The club joined the USL League Two in time for the 2020 season; however, its debut was postponed due to the 2020, 2021 and 2022 COVID-19 pandemic and consequent travel restrictions. The club did not take part also to the 2023 USL League Two season; it still remains indexed as a member of that league in the USL site. |
| (Canada) Toronto FC | MLS | 2007–present | |
| (Canada) Vancouver Whitecaps FC | MLS | 2011–present | The Whitecaps played in the USL First Division until 2009 and in the temporary USSF Division 2 in 2010. |
| (Canada) CF Montréal | MLS | 2012–present | Montreal Impact was the same as their predecessors, as it had played the previous three seasons in three different US-based leagues: the USL First Division in 2009, the temporary USSF Division 2 in 2010, and the new NASL in 2011. |
| (Canada) Toronto FC II | MLS Next Pro | 2014–present | They previously played in the USL Championship (both clubs) and USL League One (Toronto FC II). |
| (Canada) Whitecaps FC 2 | MLS Next Pro | 2014–present | They previously played in the USL Championship (both clubs) and USL League One (Toronto FC II). |
| (Canada) Thunder Bay Chill | USL League Two | 2000–2024 | |
| (Canada) FC Manitoba | USL League Two | 2020–2023 | Formerly known as WSA Winnipeg. |
| Puerto Rico Islanders | North American Soccer League | 2003 - 2012 | The Islanders had played in the first two NASL seasons of 2011 and 2012, as well as in the USL First Division in 2009 and USSF D2 Pro League in 2010. |
| Puerto Rico FC | North American Soccer League | 2016 - 2017 | |
| Sevilla FC Puerto Rico | USL Pro | Initially were going to play in the 2011 season, but were removed due to severe economic difficulties; moved to Puerto Rican leagues. | |
| Club Atlético River Plate Puerto Rico | USL Pro | Initially were going to play in the 2011 season, but were removed due to severe economic difficulties; moved to Puerto Rican leagues. | |
| Puerto Rico United | USL Pro | Initially were going to play in the 2011 season, but were removed due to severe economic difficulties; moved to Puerto Rican leagues. | |
| Puerto Rico Capitals | Women's Premier Soccer League | 2008 - 2010 | Even though Puerto Rico is a dependent territory of the United States, it has a separate football federation, the Puerto Rican Football Federation. The highest level of competition within Puerto Rico is the Puerto Rico Soccer League, and teams can qualify domestically as Puerto Rican entrants in the Caribbean Club Championship and the CONCACAF Champions League. |

== Asia and Oceania ==
| Club | League system | Current / last league | Period | Details |
|---|---|---|---|---|
| (Australia) Perth Kangaroos IFC | (Singapore) Singaporean football league system | Singapore Premier League | 1994 | They placed first and second, respectively. |
| (Australia) Darwin Cubs | (Singapore) Singaporean football league system | Singapore Premier League | 1994 | They placed first and second, respectively. |
| (Malaysia) Harimau Muda A | (Singapore) Singaporean football league system | Singapore Premier League | 2012 - 2015 | As part of a two-way arrangement with the Football Association of Singapore. |
| (Australia) South Melbourne FC | (Australia) Australian soccer league system | OFC Professional League | 2026 - | Participates in the Australian Championship, the second tier of Australian soccer and in the OFC Pro League. |
| (Brunei) DPMM FC | (Malaysia) Malaysian football league system | Malaysia Premier League | 2006 | Expelled from the MSL for the 2008 season. Returned in 2025 season for initial three seasons. |
| (Brunei) DPMM FC | (Malaysia) Malaysian football league system | Malaysia Super League | 2007 - 2008; 2025–present | Expelled from the MSL for the 2008 season. Returned in 2025 season for initial three seasons. |
| Brunei M-League Team | (Malaysia) Malaysian football league system | 2005 Liga Premier | 1979 - 2005 | Malaysia Cup winners in 1999 |
| Singapore Lions | (Malaysia) Malaysian football league system | Malaysia Super League | 1921 - 1994 | |
| (Singapore) LionsXII | (Malaysia) Malaysian football league system | Malaysia Super League | 2011 - 2015 | |
| (South Korea) Seoul Phoenix FC | (Malaysia) Malaysian football league system | Malaysia A1 Semi-Pro League | 2025 - | Formerly known as FC Sejong and previously played in the K4 League. |
| (Brunei) DPMM FC | (Singapore) Singaporean football league system | Singapore Premier League | 2009–2025 | DPMM were also invited to take part in the Singapore Cup from 2004. After the FIFA ban on the Brunei FA in 2009, DPMM FC suspended their participation starting the 2010 season and resumed it only in 2012. |
| (China) Xiangxue Pharmaceutical | Hong Kong football league system | Hong Kong First Division League | 2001 - 2005 | While Hong Kong is a special administrative region of China, it has its own football federation (Hong Kong Football Association) and professional league (Hong Kong Premier League). Xiangxue Pharmaceutical was named as Guangdong Mingfeng and Guangzhou Xiangxue. The club was a reserve team of Guangzhou F.C. and Hunan Shoking during 2002-04 and 2004-05 seasons respectively. |
| (China) Dongguan Nancheng | Hong Kong football league system | Hong Kong First Division League | 2003 - 2004 | Dongguan Nancheng was based in Dongguan, Guangdong, China. |
| (China) Sunray Cave | Hong Kong football league system | Hong Kong First Division League | 2003 - 2005 | Sunray Cave was a satellite team of Guangdong Sunray Cave. |
| (China) Lanwa FC | Hong Kong football league system | Hong Kong First Division League | 2005 - 2008 | Lanwa FC was formerly named as Dongguan Dongcheng F.C. After an unsuccessful season that the club has relegated to China League Two, the club has switched to participate in the Hong Kong First Division League. |
| (China) Chengdu Sheffield United | Hong Kong football league system | Hong Kong First Division League | 2008 - 2009 | Both teams were reserve teams of mainland Chinese clubs, but played their home games in Hong Kong. |
| (China) Xiangxue Eisiti | Hong Kong football league system | Hong Kong First Division League | 2008 - 2009 | Both teams were reserve teams of mainland Chinese clubs, but played their home games in Hong Kong. |
| (Japan) Yokohamha F.C. Hong Kong | Hong Kong football league system | Hong Kong First Division League | 2012 - 2013 | Yokohamha F.C. Hong Kong was a satellite team of Yokohama F.C., a professional club in the J. League. |
| (China) R&F | Hong Kong football league system | Hong Kong Premier League | 2016 - 2020 | R&F was a satellite team of Guangzhou R&F F.C., a top-level professional club in the Super League; after failing to win a trophy in four years, R&F officially announced withdrawal from the league on 14 October 2020. |
| (Macau) MFA Development | (China) Chinese football league system | (China) Chinese Champions League | 2018 | Not eligible for promotion to the Chinese third-tier. |
| (Macau) Chao Pak Kei | (China) Chinese football league system | (China) Chinese Champions League | 2023 | Not eligible for promotion to the Chinese third-tier. |
| Macau U23 | (China) Chinese football league system | (China) Chinese Champions League | 2025 | Not eligible for promotion to the Chinese third-tier. |
| (Malaysia) Harimau Muda A | (Australia) Australian soccer league system | National Premier Leagues Queensland | 2014 | Played their games in Australia. |
| (New Zealand) Wellington Phoenix | (Australia) Australian soccer league system | A-League Men | 2007–present | As New Zealand is a member of OFC and Australia is a member of AFC since moving from OFC in 2006, Auckland and Wellington Phoenix are playing in the league of a member of another football confederation. As per agreement with FIFA, AFC and OFC, both teams are not allowed to participate in the AFC Champions League, regardless of their results in the A-League or the Australia Cup. They also do not participate in the OFC Champions League, as New Zealand is represented by clubs from its football league, the New Zealand National League (NZNL). Wellington Phoenix and Auckland FC are the only extant professional football teams in New Zealand; the NZNL is semi-professional. The reserve team of Wellington Phoenix began play in the NZ Championship in 2014–15, and have featured in every season since. |
| (New Zealand) Auckland FC | (Australia) Australian soccer league system | A-League Men | 2024–present | |
| (New Zealand) Wellington Phoenix Women | (Australia) Australian soccer league system | A-League Women | 2021–present | |
| New Zealand Knights | (Australia) Australian soccer league system | National Soccer League | 1999 - 2004 | As "Football Kingz FC" |
| New Zealand Knights | (Australia) Australian soccer league system | A-League | 2005 - 2007 | |

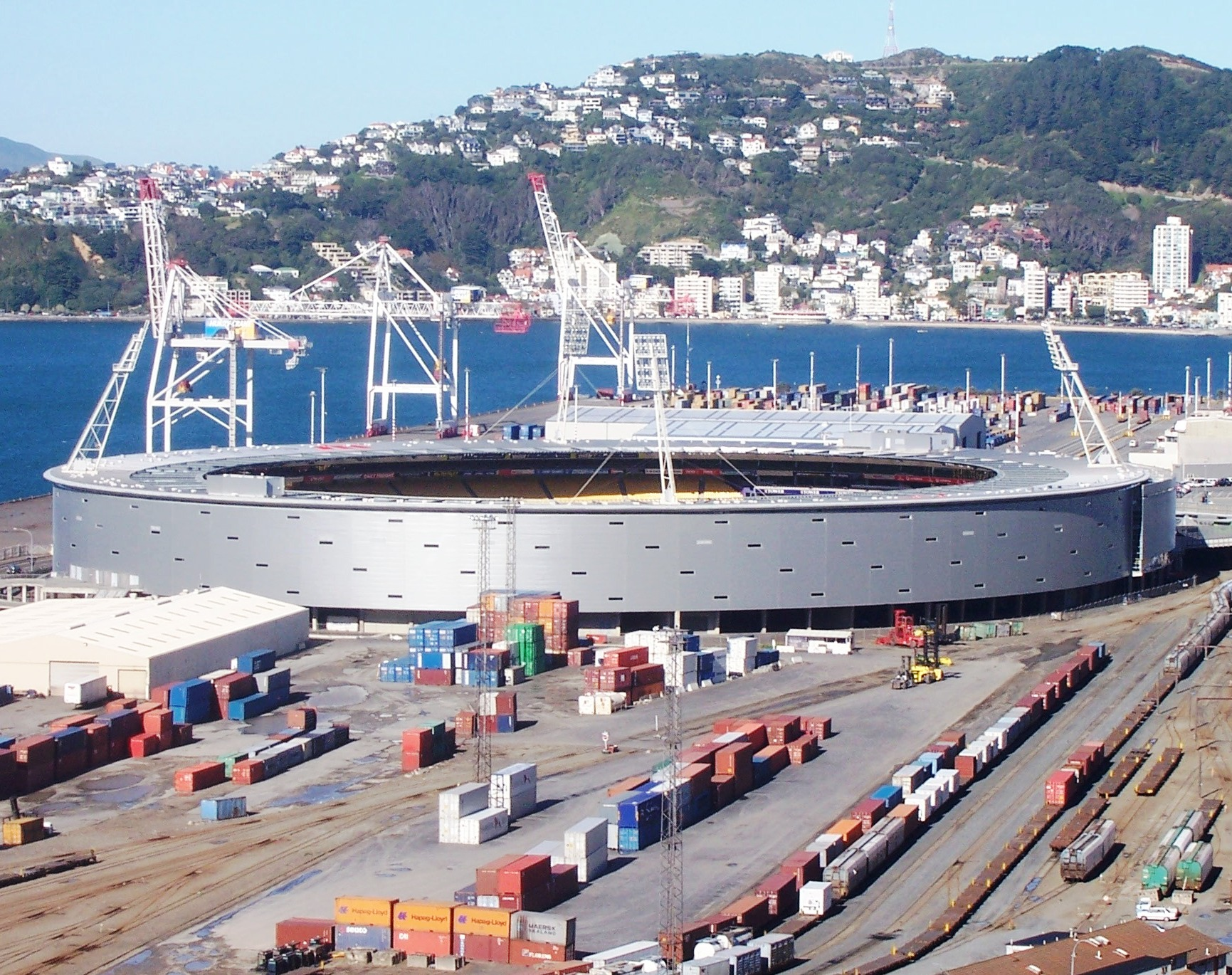
Wellington Regional Stadium, home of the Wellington Phoenix, one of two New Zealand teams in Australia's A-League Men

=== Satellite teams in Singapore ===
A number of teams in the S.League played their home games in Singapore but are satellite teams of foreign clubs:

| Satellite club | Affiliated club | Affiliated league |
|---|---|---|
| Albirex Niigata Singapore FC | (Japan) Albirex Niigata | (Japan) J. League |
| Beijing Guoan Talent Singapore FC | (China) Beijing Guoan F.C | (China) Super League |
| Dalian Shide Siwu FC | (China) Dalian Haichang | (China) Super League |
| Liaoning Guangyuan FC | (China) Liaoning FC | (China) Super League |

In 2024, Albirex Niigata Singapore underwent localisation with players now predominantly Singaporean. This as well as the exit of DPMM FC means that from the 2025–26 season, all participants of the Singapore Premier League are local clubs.

In recent years, foreign clubs from other countries have also been invited to participate in the Singapore Cup. The most recent entrant was BG Pathum United of the Thai League 1 at the 2024–25 Singapore Cup.
