= Juzet =

Juzet may refer to two communes in the Haute-Garonne department in southwestern France:

- Juzet-de-Luchon
- Juzet-d'Izaut
