= Antignac =

Antignac is the name of the following communes in France:

- Antignac, Cantal, in the Cantal department
- Antignac, Haute-Garonne, in the Haute-Garonne department
