= Pont de Rei =

- Coordinates: 42°50′57″N 0°44′09″E
- Carries: Commercial Vehicles Non-commercial Vehicles
- Crosses: Garonne
- Locale: Fos, France – Bausen, Spain
- Official name: Pont de Rei (Catalan)
- Other name: Pont du Roi (French)

Location
- Interactive map of Pont de Rei

The Pont de Rei (English: King's Bridge, French: Pont du Roi, Occitan: Eth Pònt de Rei) is a bridge and border crossing over the river Garonne that connects the Aran Valley of Spain with the Haute-Garonne department of France. The road on the French side is N125, ending in the commune of Fos; on the Spanish side the road is N-230, ending in the municipality of Bausen.

== History ==
In 1515, the Plan d'Arem agreement was signed at the crossing between Spanish and French nobles and representatives to guarantee free passage and exchange of goods between the valleys on both sides of the border. A festival was held and a monument erected in 2015 to commemorate the 500-year anniversary of the treaty.

The border crossing was used by many Spanish refugees fleeing to France during the Spanish Civil War; and in the other direction by Jews fleeing the Nazi occupation of France. In 1944, the crossing was the point of entry and retreat for anti-Franco forces during the failed Invasion of Aran Valley.
