= Flag of Val d'Aran =

Val d'Aran
- Proportion: 3:2
- Adopted: October 11, 1993; 33 years ago
- Design: A red or burgundy field with the coat of arms of Val d'Aran in the center surrounded by a gold Occitan cross

The flag of Val d'Aran is the official flag of Val d'Aran (Aran Valley), an autonomous administrative region located in northern Catalonia, Spain. The present flag was adopted by the Conselh Generau d'Aran, the governing body of the region, on October 11, 1993.

== Description and symbolisms ==
The flag of Val d'Aran represents Val d'Aran, an Occitan speaking region, as the heart of Occitania and the Occitan people. The flag features the coat of arms of Val d'Aran in the center surrounded by the Occitan cross (or Cross of Toulouse), a symbol of Occitania.
