= UE Bossòst =

- Full name: Unión Esportiva Bossòst
- Founded: 1927
- Owner: General Council of Aran
- League: Departmental 2 Haute-Garrone

UE Bossòst is an Occitan football club based in Bossòst, Catalonia. The club currently competes in the Departmental 2, the 10th tier of football in France.

UE Bossòst was founded between 1920 and 1927. It has always played in French leagues since it was founded due to its geographical and social proximity.

It has no sponsor and financed with the fees of its approximately 160 members and with grants from the General Council of Aran. It also relies on the sale of lottery numbers.

== Team ==
It is the main team of the Vall d'Aran, especially after the disappearance of Vielha Club de Fùtbol (from Vielha). They play in the Departmental 2 – the 10th division of France. They also play in the French Cup, the most important competition of the season, in fact they could even reach the final, but usually they do not pass the second or third round. They have never played against a team in the professional division.

One of the main differences between the club is the diversity of languages spoken in the Bossòst dressing room – Aranese, Spanish, Catalan – while only French is spoken in the rival teams.

It also plays the Copa de Comminges, a tournament played by clubs from the divisions of the Comminges region, where U.E. Bossòst has been playing since the twenties. Bossòst has won this trophy on two occasions, the last time was in 2007.

== Why UE Bossòst plays in France ==
In the first years of the team, they could not cross to the other side of the valley because of the snow, for this reason the football team of the Aran Valley plays in France. In fact, until they built the Vielha tunnel, they could not cross into Catalan territory during the winter.
