= Sode, Haute-Garonne =

Sode
- Commune
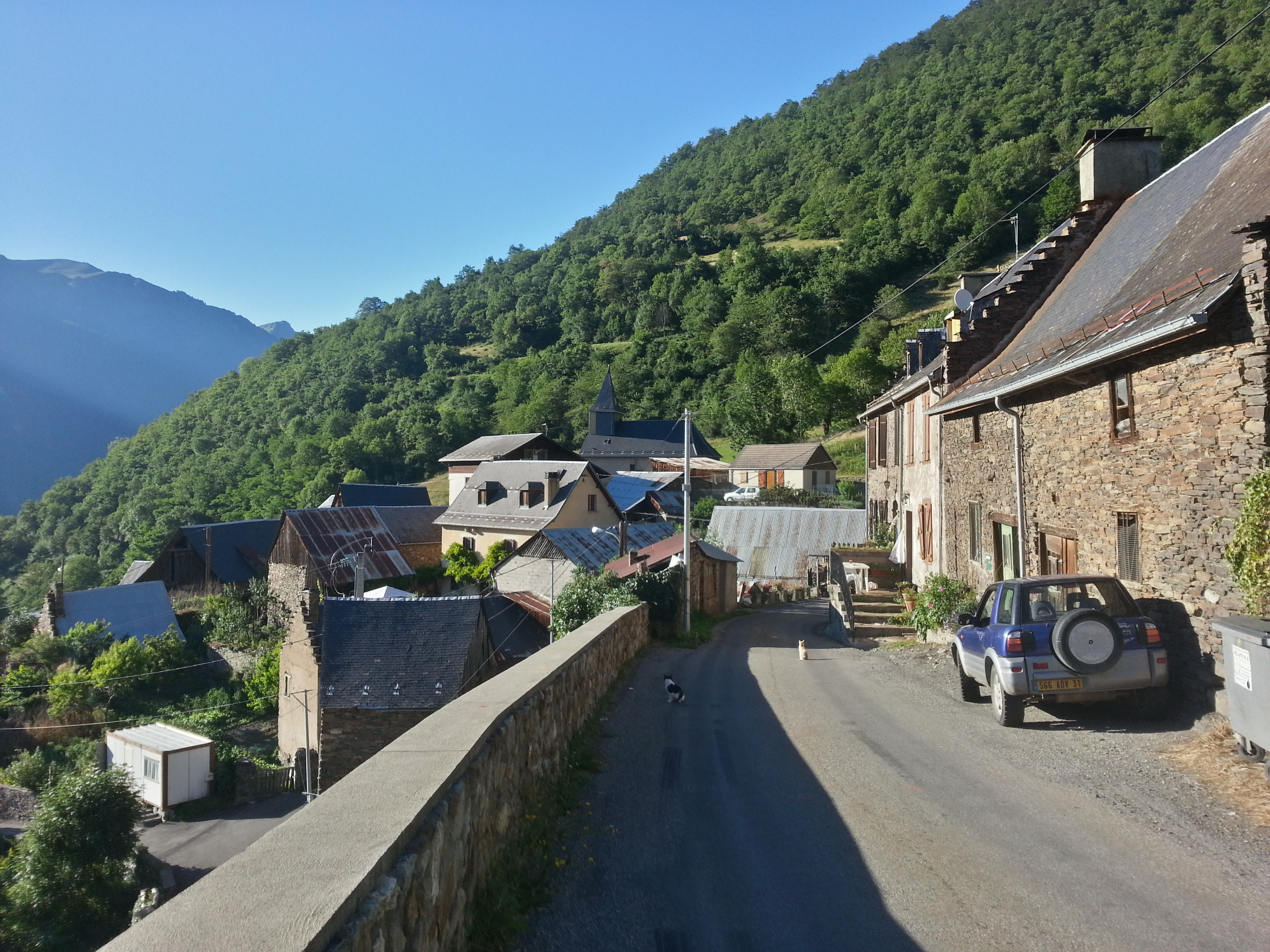
- A view within Sode
- Location of Sode
- Location within France Location within Occitanie
- Coordinates: 42°49′02″N 0°37′00″E
- Country: France
- Region: Occitania
- Department: Haute-Garonne
- Arrondissement: Saint-Gaudens
- Canton: Bagnères-de-Luchon

Government
  - Mayor (2020–2026): Augustine Hadjadj
- Area^{1}: 5.53 km^{2} (2.14 sq mi)
- Elevation: 608 m (1,995 ft)
- Highest elevation: 2,019 m (6,624 ft)
- Lowest elevation: 760 m (2,490 ft)
- Population (2023): 18
  - Density: 3.3/km^{2} (8.4/sq mi)
- Time zone: UTC+01:00 (CET)
  - Summer (DST): UTC+02:00 (CEST)
- INSEE/Postal code: 31549 /31110
- ^{1} French Land Register data, which excludes lakes, ponds, glaciers > 1 km^{2} (0.386 sq mi or 247 acres) and river estuaries.

Sode (French pronunciation: [sɔd]; Occitan: Sòda) is a commune in the Haute-Garonne department in southwestern France.

== Demographics ==
Historical population
Year	Pop.	±% p.a.
1968	25	—
1975	32	+3.59%
1982	28	−1.89%
1990	18	−5.37%
1999	19	+0.60%
2007	24	+2.96%
2012	21	−2.64%
2017	18	−3.04%
2023	18	+0.00%
Source: INSEE

== See also ==
- Communes of the Haute-Garonne department
