= Vilamòs =

- Municipality
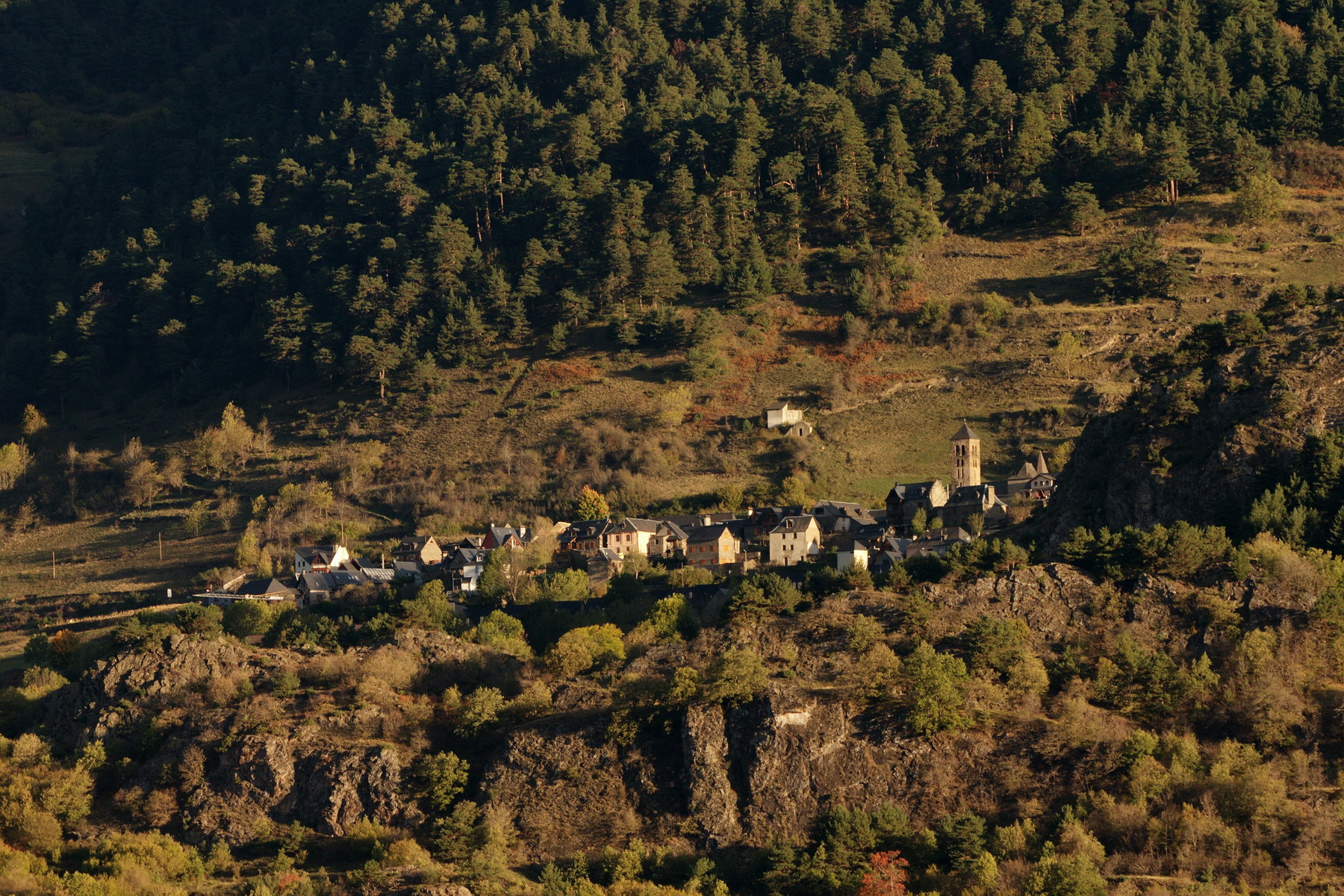
- Vilamòs, with St. Mary's church tower

- Coat of arms

- Location in Aran

- Location in Catalonia
- Coordinates: 42°44′58″N 0°43′39″E
- Country: Spain
- Community: Catalonia
- Province: Lleida
- Entity: Aran
- Terçon: Irissa

Government
  - Mayor: Oriol Sala Sánchez (2019) (UA)

Area
  - Total: 15.4 km^{2} (5.9 sq mi)

Population (2025-01-01)
  - Total: 174
  - Density: 11.3/km^{2} (29.3/sq mi)
- Website: www.vilamos.es

Vilamòs (Occitan pronunciation: [bilaˈmɔs]) is a municipality in western Aran, Province of Lleida, Catalonia, Spain. It has a population of 174 (register office, 2025). The mayor is Oriol Sala Sánchez (UA). It is located in the terçon of Irissa.
