= First Football League of North Kosovo =

Association football league in Serbia

- Founded: 2010
- Country: Serbia
- Confederation: Football Association of Serbia
- Number of clubs: 7
- Level on pyramid: 5
- Promotion to: Šumadija-Raška Zone League
- Current champions: FK Kopaonik Lešak
- Most championships: FK Kopaonik Lešak
- Website: http://www.srbijasport.net/tak/595
- Current: 2019–20 season

The League of North Kosovo (Serbian: Liga Severnog Kosova/Лига Северног Косова) is the top football regional league in North Kosovo, ranked fifth in the Serbian league system. The league is formed primarily of Serbian football clubs that come from four of North Kosovo's municipalities such as Leposavić, Zvečan, Zubin Potok and Northern Kosovska Mitrovica. The league was formed in protest to the establishment of the Kosovo Super League by the Republic of Kosovo; the Serbian clubs from North Kosovo refuse to enter the Republic of Kosovo's institutions as per the Assembly of the Community of Municipalities of the Autonomous Province of Kosovo and Metohija.

- FK Ibar Leposavić
- FK Kopaonik Lešak
- FK Sočanica
- FK Zvečan
- FK Radnik Prilužje
- FK Moša Banje

There are two other clubs from North Kosovo, FK Trepča and FK Mokra Gora, however these clubs compete in the Morava Zone League. The former had FK Partizan Kosovska Mitrovica merge with FK Rudar Kosovska Mitrovica to form FK Trepča Kosovska Mitrovica.
