= French football league system =

Series of interconnected leagues for club football

The French football league system, also known as the French football pyramid, is a series of interconnected leagues for club football in France and Monaco, and includes one Spanish side. (Note: UE Bossòst play in the Occitanie League, Haute-Garonne division.) At the top two levels of the system is the Ligue de Football Professionnel, which consists of two professional national divisions, Ligue 1, Ligue 2. Below that are a number of leagues run by the Fédération Française de Football. At level 3 is the semi-professional Ligue 3. Below that is the Championnat National 1 (level 4), which is divided into four parallel regional divisions, followed by the Championnat National 2 (level 5), which is divided into eleven parallel regional divisions. Underneath that are many more regional and departmental leagues and divisions. Clubs finishing the season at or near the top of their division may be eligible for promotion to a higher division. Similarly, clubs finishing at or near the bottom of their division may be relegated to a lower division.

== Men ==
=== National leagues ===
Starting in 2026–27 there were changes at level 3 (significant restructuring and rename turning as professional), levels 4 and 5 (in name only as National 1 and 2).

Level	League(s)/Division(s)							
	Professional leagues							
1	Ligue 1; 18 clubs ↓ 2 relegation spots + 1 relegation play-off spot							
2	Ligue 2; 18 clubs ↑ 2 promotion spots + 3 promotion play-off spot ↓ 2 relegation spots + 1 relegation play-off spot							
3	Ligue 3; 18 clubs ↑ 2 promotion spots + 4 promotion play-off spot ↓ 3 relegation spots							
	Semi-professional leagues							
4	National 1; 48 clubs divided into 3 groups ↑ 3 promotion spots ↓ 10 relegation spots							
4	Group A 16 clubs			Group B 16 clubs		Group C 16 clubs		
5	National 2; 112 clubs divided into 8 groups = 14x8 ↑ 8 promotion spots ↓ 25 relegation spots							
5	Group A 14 clubs	Group B 14 clubs	Group C 14 clubs	Group D 14 clubs	Group E 14 clubs	Group F 14 clubs	Group G 14 clubs	Group H 14 clubs

=== Regional leagues ===
As of the 2022–23 season, this is the structure of the amateur regional leagues, operating directly below the national leagues.

Leagues	Level 6	Level 7	Level 8	Level 9
Auvergne-Rhône-Alpes	Régional 1	Régional 2	Régional 3	
Bourgogne-Franche-Comté	Régional 1	Régional 2	Régional 3	
Bretagne	Régional 1	Régional 2	Régional 3	
Centre-Val de Loire	Régional 1	Régional 2	Régional 3	
Corsica	Régional 1	Régional 2	Régional 3	Régional 4
Grand Est	Régional 1	Régional 2	Régional 3	
Hauts-de-France	Régional 1	Régional 2	Régional 3	
Méditerranée	Régional 1	Régional 2	Régional 3	
Normandy	Régional 1	Régional 2	Régional 3	
Nouvelle Aquitaine	Régional 1	Régional 2	Régional 3	
Occitanie	Régional 1	Régional 2	Régional 3	
Paris Île-de-France	Régional 1	Régional 2	Régional 3	
Pays de la Loire	Régional 1	Régional 2	Régional 3	

=== Departmental leagues ===
As of the 2019–20 season, this is the structure of the amateur departmental leagues, operating at various levels below the regional leagues.

==== Auvergne-Rhône-Alpes region ====
Departmental districts	Level 9	Level 10	Level 11	Level 12	Level 13
Ain	Départemental 1	Départemental 2	Départemental 3	Départemental 4	Départemental 5
Allier	Départemental 1	Départemental 2	Départemental 3	Départemental 4	Départemental 5
Cantal	Départemental 1	Départemental 2	Départemental 3	Départemental 4	Départemental 5
Drôme-Ardèche	Départemental 1	Départemental 2	Départemental 3	Départemental 4	Départemental 5
Haute-Loire	Départemental 1	Départemental 2	Départemental 3	Départemental 4	Départemental 5
Haute-Savoie-Pays de Gex	Départemental 1	Départemental 2	Départemental 3	Départemental 4	Départemental 5
Isère	Départemental 1	Départemental 2	Départemental 3	Départemental 4	Départemental 5
Loire	Départemental 1	Départemental 2	Départemental 3	Départemental 4	Départemental 5
Lyon Metropolis-Rhône	Départemental 1	Départemental 2	Départemental 3	Départemental 4	Départemental 5
Puy-de-Dôme	Départemental 1	Départemental 2	Départemental 3	Départemental 4	Départemental 5
Savoie	Départemental 1	Départemental 2	Départemental 3	Départemental 4	Départemental 5

==== Bourgogne-Franche-Comté region ====
Departmental districts	Level 9	Level 10	Level 11	Level 12
Côte-d'Or	Départemental 1	Départemental 2	Départemental 3	Départemental 4
Doubs-Territoire de Belfort	Départemental 1	Départemental 2	Départemental 3	Départemental 4
Haute-Saône	Départemental 1	Départemental 2	Départemental 3	Départemental 4
Jura	Départemental 1	Départemental 2	Départemental 3	Départemental 4
Nièvre	Départemental 1	Départemental 2	Départemental 3	Départemental 4
Saône-et-Loire	Départemental 1	Départemental 2	Départemental 3	Départemental 4
Yonne	Départemental 1	Départemental 2	Départemental 3	Départemental 4

==== Bretagne region ====
Departmental districts	Level 9	Level 10	Level 11	Level 12	Level 13
Côtes-d'Armor	Départemental 1	Départemental 2	Départemental 3	Départemental 4	
Finistère	Départemental 1	Départemental 2	Départemental 3	Départemental 4	
Ille-et-Vilaine	Départemental 1	Départemental 2	Départemental 3	Départemental 4	Départemental 5
Morbihan	Départemental 1	Départemental 2	Départemental 3	Départemental 4	

==== Centre-Val de Loire region ====
Departmental districts	Level 9	Level 10	Level 11	Level 12	Level 13
Cher	Départemental 1	Départemental 2	Départemental 3	Départemental 4	Départemental 5
Eure-et-Loir	Départemental 1	Départemental 2	Départemental 3	Départemental 4	
Indre	Départemental 1	Départemental 2	Départemental 3	Départemental 4	Départemental 5
Indre-et-Loire	Départemental 1	Départemental 2	Départemental 3	Départemental 4	Départemental 5
Loiret	Départemental 1	Départemental 2	Départemental 3	Départemental 4	Départemental 5
Loir-et-Cher	Départemental 1	Départemental 2	Départemental 3	Départemental 4	

==== Corsica region ====
There are no district divisions in Corsica. The system in Corsica goes up to Régional 4.

==== Grand Est region ====
Departmental districts	Level 9	Level 10	Level 11	Level 12	Level 13	Level 14	Level 15	Level 16	Level 17
Alsace	District 1	District 2	District 3	District 4	District 5	District 6	District 7	District 8	District 9
Ardennes	Départemental 1	Départemental 2	Départemental 3	Départemental 4					
Aube	Départemental 1	Départemental 2	Départemental 3						
Haute-Marne	Départemental 1	Départemental 2	Départemental 3	Départemental 4					
Marne	District 1	District 2	District 3	District 4					
Meurthe-et-Moselle	Division 1	Division 2	Division 3	Division 4					
Meuse	Division 1	Division 2	Division 3						
Moselle	Division 1	Division 2	Division 3	Division 4					
Vosges	Division 1	Division 2	Division 3	Division 4					

==== Hauts-de-France region ====
Departmental districts	Level 9	Level 10	Level 11	Level 12	Level 13	Level 14	Level 15
Aisne	Départemental 1	Départemental 2	Départemental 3	Départemental 4	Départemental 5		
Artois	Départemental 1	Départemental 2	Départemental 3	Départemental 4	Départemental 5	Départemental 6	Départemental 7
Côte d'Opale	Départemental 1	Départemental 2	Départemental 3	Départemental 4	Départemental 5	Départemental 6	Départemental 7
Escaut	Départemental 1	Départemental 2	Départemental 3	Départemental 4	Départemental 5	Départemental 6	Départemental 7
Flandres	Départemental 1	Départemental 2	Départemental 3	Départemental 4	Départemental 5	Départemental 6	Départemental 7
Oise	Départemental 1	Départemental 2	Départemental 3	Départemental 4	Départemental 5		
Somme	Départemental 1	Départemental 2	Départemental 3	Départemental 4	Départemental 5	Départemental 6	Départemental 7

==== Provence Alpes-Cote d'Azur Region ====
Departmental districts	Level 9	Level 10	Level 11	Level 12	Level 13
Alpes (Alpes-de-Haute-Provence and Hautes-Alpes)	District 1	District 2	District 3		
Côte d'Azur (Alpes-Maritimes)	District 1	District 2	District 3	District 4	District 5
Provence (Bouches-du-Rhône)	Départemental 1	Départemental 2	Départemental 3	Départemental 4	
Grand Vaucluse	District 1	District 2	District 3	District 4	
Var	Départemental 1	Départemental 2	Départemental 3	Départemental 4	

==== Normandy region ====
Departmental districts	Level 9	Level 10	Level 11	Level 12
Calvados	Départemental 1	Départemental 2	Départemental 3	Départemental 4
Eure	Départemental 1	Départemental 2	Départemental 3	Départemental 4
Manche	Départemental 1	Départemental 2	Départemental 3	Départemental 4
Orne	Départemental 1	Départemental 2	Départemental 3	Départemental 4
Seine-Maritime	Départemental 1	Départemental 2	Départemental 3	Départemental 4

==== Nouvelle Aquitaine region ====
Departmental districts	Level 9	Level 10	Level 11	Level 12	Level 13	Level 14
Charente	Départemental 1	Départemental 2	Départemental 3	Départemental 4	Départemental 5	
Charente-Maritime	Départemental 1	Départemental 2	Départemental 3	Départemental 4		
Corrèze	Départemental 1	Départemental 2	Départemental 3	Départemental 4		
Creuse	Départemental 1	Départemental 2	Départemental 3	Départemental 4		
Deux-Sèvres	Départemental 1	Départemental 2	Départemental 3	Départemental 4	Départemental 5	
Dordogne-Périgord (Dordogne)	Départemental 1	Départemental 2	Départemental 3	Départemental 4		
Gironde	Départemental 1	Départemental 2	Départemental 3	Départemental 4		
Haute-Vienne	Départemental 1	Départemental 2	Départemental 3	Départemental 4	Départemental 5	
Landes	Départemental 1	Départemental 2	Départemental 3	Départemental 4		
Lot-et-Garonne	Départemental 1	Départemental 2	Départemental 3	Départemental 4		
Pyrénées-Atlantiques	Départemental 1	Départemental 2	Départemental 3	Départemental 4		
Vienne	Départemental 1	Départemental 2	Départemental 3	Départemental 4	Départemental 5	Départemental 6

==== Occitanie region ====
Departmental districts	Level 9	Level 10	Level 11	Level 12	Level 13	Level 14
Ariège	Départemental 1	Départemental 2	Départemental 3	Départemental 4		
Aude	Départemental 1	Départemental 2	Départemental 3	Départemental 4		
Aveyron	Départemental 1	Départemental 2	Départemental 3	Départemental 4	Départemental 5	Départemental 6
Haute-Garonne	Départemental 1	Départemental 2	Départemental 3	Départemental 4	Départemental 5	
Hautes-Pyrénées	Départemental 1	Départemental 2	Départemental 3	Départemental 4		
Gard-Lozère	Départemental 1	Départemental 2	Départemental 3	Départemental 4		
Gers	Départemental 1	Départemental 2	Départemental 3			
Hérault	Départemental 1	Départemental 2	Départemental 3	Départemental 4	Départemental 5	
Lot	Division 1	Division 2	Division 3	Division 4		
Pyrénées-Orientales	Départemental 1	Départemental 2	Départemental 3	Départemental 4		
Tarn	Division 1	Division 2	Division 3	Division 4		
Tarn-et-Garonne	Départemental 1	Départemental 2	Départemental 3	Départemental 4	Départemental 5	

==== Paris Île-de-France region ====
Clubs in the arrondissements of Paris are divided between the three surrounding suburban districts. The District of Hauts-de-Seine includes 6th, 7th, 8th, 14th, 15th, 16th and 17th, the District of Seine-Saint-Denis has the 9th, 10th, 11th, 18th, 19th, 20th and the District of Val-de-Marne includes 1st, 2nd, 3rd, 4th, 5th, 12th and 13th.

Departmental districts	Level 9	Level 10	Level 11	Level 12	Level 13	Level 14
Essonne	Départemental 1	Départemental 2	Départemental 3	Départemental 4	Départemental 5	
Hauts-de-Seine	Départemental 1	Départemental 2	Départemental 3	Départemental 4	Départemental 5	Départemental 6
Seine-et-Marne	Départemental 1	Départemental 2	Départemental 3	Départemental 4		
Seine-Saint-Denis	Départemental 1	Départemental 2	Départemental 3	Départemental 4	Départemental 5	
Val d'Oise	Départemental 1	Départemental 2	Départemental 3	Départemental 4		
Val-de-Marne	Départemental 1	Départemental 2	Départemental 3	Départemental 4		
Yvelines	Départemental 1	Départemental 2	Départemental 3	Départemental 4	Départemental 5	Départemental 6

==== Pays de la Loire region ====
Departmental districts	Level 9	Level 10	Level 11	Level 12	Level 13
Loire-Atlantique	Départemental 1	Départemental 2	Départemental 3	Départemental 4	Départemental 5
Maine-et-Loire	Première Division	Deuxième Division	Troisième Division	Quatrième Division	Cinquième Division
Mayenne	Départemental 1	Départemental 2	Départemental 3	Départemental 4	
Sarthe	Départemental 1	Départemental 2	Départemental 3	Départemental 4	
Vendée	Division 1	Division 2	Division 3	Division 4	Division 5

== Men (national leagues only) (2017-2024) ==
=== National leagues ===
Starting in 2017–18 there were changes at Levels 3 and 4 (in name only) and Level 5 (significant restructuring and rename).

Level	League(s)/Division(s)			
	Professional Leagues			
1	Ligue 1; 20 clubs			
2	Ligue 2; 20 clubs			
	Semi-Professional League			
3	National; 18 clubs			
	Non-Professional Leagues			
4	National 1 group A 16 clubs	National 1 group B 16 clubs	National 1 group C 16 clubs	National 1 group D 16 clubs
5	National 3 Group Auvergne-Rhône-Alpes 14 clubs National 3 Group Bourgogne-Franche-Comté 14 clubs National 3 Group Bretagne 14 clubs National 3 Group Centre-Val de Loire 14 clubs National 3 Group Grand Est 14 clubs National 3 Group Hauts-de-France 14 clubs National 3 Group Île-de-France 14 clubs National 3 Group Normandy 14 clubs National 3 Group Nouvelle Aquitaine 14 clubs National 3 Group Occitanie 14 clubs National 3 Group Pays de la Loire 14 clubs National 3 Group Provence-Alpes-Côte d'Azur-Corsica 14 clubs			

== Men (pre-2017) ==
=== National leagues ===
The 2016–17 season was the last of the former league structure. From 2017–18 there were changes at Levels 3 and 4 (in name only) and Level 5 (significant restructuring and rename).

Level	League(s)/Division(s)							
1	Ligue 1; 20 clubs							
2	Ligue 2; 20 clubs							
3	National; 18 clubs							
4	CFA group A 16 clubs		CFA group B 16 clubs		CFA group C 16 clubs		CFA group D 16 clubs	
5	CFA2 group A 14 clubs	CFA2 group B 14 clubs	CFA2 group C 14 clubs	CFA2 group D 14 clubs	CFA2 group E 14 clubs	CFA2 group F 14 clubs	CFA2 group G 14 clubs	CFA2 group H 14 clubs

=== Regional leagues ===
For the 2016–17 season, this was the structure of the regional leagues, operating directly below the national leagues. Despite the varying names given some regions, level 6 leagues are generically referred to as Division d'Honneur or DH.

Leagues	Level 6	Level 7	Level 8	Level 9	Level 10
Alsace	Division Honneur
Aquitaine	Regional 1	Regional 2	Regional 3	Regional 4
Atlantique	Division Honneur	Division Régionale Supérieure	Division Régionale Honneur	Promotion Honneur
Auvergne	Regional 1	Regional 2	Regional 3
Basse-Normandie	Division Honneur	Division Supérieure Régionale	Division Honneur Régionale	Promotion Honneur
Bourgogne	Honneur Ligue	Promotion Honneur	Promotion Ligue
Bretagne	Division Honneur	Division Supérieure Élite	Division Supérieure Régionale	Division Régionale Honneur	Promotion Honneur
Centre-Val de Loire	Division Honneur	Division Honneur Régionale	Promotion Honneur
Centre-Ouest	Division Honneur	Division Honneur Régionale	Promotion Honneur	Promotion Ligue
Champagne-Ardenne	Division Honneur	Division Honneur Régionale	Promotion Ligue
Corsica	Division Honneur	Promotion Honneur A	Promotion Honneur B	Promotion Honneur C
Franche-Comté	Division Honneur	Ligue Régionale 2	Ligue Régionale 3
Languedoc-Roussillon	Division Honneur	Division Honneur Régionale
Lorraine	Division Honneur	Division Honneur Régionale	Promotion Honneur	Promotion Honneur Régionale
Maine	Division Honneur	Division Supérieure Régionale	Division Régionale Honneur	Promotion Honneur
Provence Alpes-Cote d'Azur	Division Honneur	Division Honneur Régionale
Midi-Pyrénées	Division Honneur	Division Honneur Régionale	Promotion Honneur	Promotion Ligue
Nord-Pas-de-Calais	Division Honneur	Division Honneur Régionale	Promotion Honneur	Promotion Honneur Régionale
Haute-Normandie	Division Honneur	Division Supérieure Régionale	Division Honneur Régionale	Promotion Honneur
Paris Île-de-France	Division Honneur	Division Supérieure Régionale	Division Honneur Régionale	Promotion Honneur
Picardy	Division Honneur	Promotion Honneur	Promotion Interdistricts
Rhône-Alpes	Honneur Ligue	Honneur Régional Ligue	Promotion Honneur Régional

=== Departmental leagues ===
For the 2016–17 season, this was the structure of the departmental leagues, operating at various levels below the regional leagues.

League of Alsace

Officially, the League of Alsace does not include departmental districts. The organization of the championships, with a single DH and departmental groups at lower levels wrongly conveys the impression that there is a district of Haut-Rhin and a district of Bas-Rhin (also sometimes called District Nord Alsace and District Sud Alsace). Below level 13 is a separate "B" league structure for reserve and other secondary teams. Teams from these divisions can be promoted to level 13 and higher, but first teams from level 13 are not relegated.

Departmental districts	Level 7	Level 8	Level 9	Level 10	Level 11	Level 12	Level 13
Bas-Rhin	Excellence	Promotion Excellence A	Promotion Honneur	Promotion A	Division 1 A	Division 2 A	Division 3 A
Haut-Rhin	Excellence	Promotion Excellence A	Promotion Honneur A	Division 1 A	Division 2 A	Division 3 A

League of Aquitaine

Departmental districts	Level 10	Level 11	Level 12	Level 13	Level 14
Bordeaux (Gironde)	Départemental 1	Départemental 2	Départemental 3	Départemental 4
Dordogne-Périgord (Dordogne)	Départemental 1	Départemental 2	Départemental 3	Départemental 4	Départemental 5
Gironde-Altantique (Gironde)	Départemental 1	Départemental 2	Départemental 3
Gironde-Est (Gironde)	Départemental 1	Départemental 2	Départemental 3	Départemental 4
Landes	Départemental 1	Départemental 2	Départemental 3	Départemental 4
Lot-et-Garonne	Départemental 1	Départemental 2	Départemental 3	Départemental 4
Pyrénées-Atlantiques	Départemental 1	Départemental 2	Départemental 3	Départemental 4	Départemental 5
Sauternais-et-Graves (Gironde)	Départemental 1	Départemental 2	Départemental 3

Atlantique League

Departmental districts	Level 10	Level 11	Level 12	Level 13	Level 14
Loire-Atlantique	Division 1	Division 2	Division 3	Division 4	Division 5
Maine-et-Loire	Première Division	Deuxième Division	Troisième Division	Quatrième Division	Cinquième Division
Vendée	Division 1	Division 2	Division 3	Division 4	Division 5

League of Auvergne

Departmental districts	Level 9	Level 10	Level 11	Level 12	Level 13	Level 14
Allier	Départemental 1	Départemental 2	Départemental 3	Départemental 4	Départemental 5
Cantal	Élite	Excellence	Promotion	Première Division	Deuxième Division	Troisième Division
Haute-Loire	District 1	District 2	District 3	District 4	District 5
Puy-de-Dôme	Départemental 1	Départemental 2	Départemental 3	Départemental 4	Départemental 5

League of Basse-Normandie

Departmental districts	Level 10	Level 11	Level 12	Level 13
Calvados	Division Supérieure District	Première Division	Deuxième Division	Troisième Division
Manche	Première Division	Deuxième Division	Troisième Division	Quatrième Division
Orne	Première Division	Deuxième Division	Troisième Division Excellence	Troisième Division

League of Bourgogne

Departmental districts	Level 9	Level 10	Level 11	Level 12	Level 13
Côte-d'Or	Promotion District	Première Division	Deuxième Division	Troisième Division
Nièvre	Promotion District	Division 1	Division 2	Division 3
Pays Minier (Saône-et-Loire)	Promotion District	Division 1	Division 2	Division 3
Pays Saônois (Saône-et-Loire)	Promotion District	Promotion Excellence	Division 1	Division 2	Division 3
Yonne	Promotion District	Première Division	Deuxième Division	Troisième Division

League of Bretagne

Departmental districts	Level 11	Level 12	Level 13	Level 14	Level 15
Côtes-d'Armor	Division 1	Division 2	Division 3	Division 4
Finistère-Nord (Finistère)	Division 1	Division 2	Division 3	Division 4
Finistère-Sud (Finistère)	Division 1	Division 2	Division 3	Division 4
Ille-et-Vilaine	Division 1	Division 2	Division 3	Division 4	Division 5
Morbihan	Division 1	Division 2	Division 3	Division 4

League of Centre-Val de Loire

Departmental districts	Level 9	Level 10	Level 11	Level 12	Level 13	Level 14
Cher	Première Division	Deuxième Division	Troisième Division	Quatrième Division	Cinquième Division
Eure-et-Loir	Première Division	Deuxième Division	Troisième Division	Quatrième Division
Indre	Première Division	Promotion Première	Deuxième Division	Troisième Division	Quatrième Division	Cinquième Division
Indre-et-Loire	Division 1	Deuxième Division	Troisième Division	Quatrième Division	Cinquième Division
Loiret	Première Division	Deuxième Division	Troisième Division	Quatrième Division	Cinquième Division
Loir-et-Cher	Première Division	Deuxième Division	Troisième Division	Quatrième Division	Cinquième Division

League of Centre-Ouest

Departmental districts	Level 10	Level 11	Level 12	Level 13	Level 14
Charente	Première Division	Deuxième Division	Troisième Division	Quatrième Division	Cinquième Division
Charente-Maritime	Première Division	Deuxième Division	Troisième Division	Quatrième Division
Corrèze	Première Division	Deuxième Division	Troisième Division	Quatrième Division
Creuse	Première Division	Deuxième Division	Troisième Division	Quatrième Division
Deux-Sèvres	Première Division	Deuxième Division	Troisième Division	Quatrième Division	Cinquième Division
Vienne	Première Division	Deuxième Division	Troisième Division	Quatrième Division	Cinquième Division
Haute-Vienne	Première Division	Deuxième Division	Troisième Division	Quatrième Division	Cinquième Division

League of Champagne-Ardenne

Departmental districts	Level 9	Level 10	Level 11	Level 12
Ardennes	District 1	District 2	District 3	District 4
Aube	Première Division	Promotion Première Division	Deuxième Division	Troisième Division
Marne	District 1	District 2	District 3	District 4
Haute-Marne	Première Division	Promotion Première Division	Deuxième Division	Troisième Division

League of Corsica

There is no district championship in Corsica.

League of Franche-Comté

Departmental districts	Level 9	Level 10	Level 11	Level 12	Level 13
Doubs-Sud/Haut-Doubs	Première Division	Deuxième Division	Troisième Division	Quatrième Division	Cinquième Division
Belfort-Montbéliard	Première Division	Deuxième Division	Troisième Division	Quatrième Division
Jura	Première Division	Deuxième Division	Troisième Division	Quatrième Division
Haute-Saône	Première Division	Deuxième Division	Troisième Division	Quatrième Division

League of Languedoc-Roussillon

Departmental districts	Level 8	Level 9	Level 10	Level 11	Level 12	Level 13
Aude	Promotion Honneur	Première Division	Promotion Première Division	Deuxième Division	Troisième Division
Gard-Lozère	Promotion Honneur A	Promotion Honneur B	Première Division	Promotion Première Division	Deuxième Division	Promotion Deuxième Division
Hérault	Promotion Honneur A	Promotion Honneur B	Première Division	Promotion Première Division	Deuxième Division
Pyrénées-Orientales	Promotion Honneur A	Promotion Honneur B	Première Division	Promotion Première Division	Deuxième Division

League of Lorraine

Departmental districts	Level 10	Level 11	Level 12	Level 13
Meurthe-et-Moselle Sud (Meurthe-et-Moselle)	Division 1	Division 2	Division 3	Division 4
Pays-Haut (Meurthe-et-Moselle)	Division 1	Division 2	Division 3	Division 4
Meuse	Division 1	Division 2	Division 3	Division 4
Moselle	Division 1	Division 2	Division 3	Division 4
Vosges	Division 1	Division 2	Division 3	Division 4

League of Maine

Departmental districts	Level 10	Level 11	Level 12	Level 13	Level 14
Mayenne	Départemental 1	Départemental 2	Départemental 3	Départemental 4	Départemental 5
Sarthe	Division 1	Division 2	Division 3	Division 4

League of Provence Alpes-Cote d'Azur

Departmental districts	Level 8	Level 9	Level 10	Level 11	Level 12
Alpes (Alpes-de-Haute-Provence and Hautes-Alpes)	Division 1	Division 2	Division 3	Division 4
Côte d'Azur (Alpes-Maritimes)	Promotion Honneur A	Promotion Honneur B	Première Division	Promotion Première Division	Deuxième Division
Provence (Bouches-du-Rhône)	Promotion Honneur A	Promotion Honneur B	Première Division	Promotion Première Division
Rhône Durance (Vaucluse)	Promotion Honneur A	Promotion Honneur B	Première Division	Promotion Première Division	Deuxième Division
Var	Promotion Honneur A	Promotion Honneur B	Première Division	Promotion Première Division

League of Midi-Pyrénées

Departmental districts	Level 10	Level 11	Level 12	Level 13	Level 14
Ariège	Excellence	Première Division	Promotion Première Division	Deuxième Division
Aveyron	Excellence	Première Division	Promotion Première Division	Deuxième Division	Troisième Division
Comminges (Haute-Garonne)	Championnat Excellence	Championnat Première Division	Promotion Première Division	Championnat Deuxième Division
Midi Toulousain (Haute-Garonne)	Excellence	Première Division	Promotion Première Division	Deuxième Division
Gers	Excellence	Promotion Excellence	Première Division	Promotion District
Hautes-Pyrénées	Excellence	Première Division	Promotion Première Division
Lot	Excellence	Promotion Excellence	Première Division	Promotion Première Division	Deuxième Division
Tarn	Excellence	Première Division	Promotion Première Division	Deuxième Division
Tarn-et-Garonne	Excellence	Promotion Excellence	Première Division	Deuxième Division	Troisième Division

League of Nord Pas-de-Calais

Departmental districts	Level 10	Level 11	Level 12	Level 13	Level 14	Level 15	Level 16	Level 17
Artois (Pas-de-Calais)	Excellence	Promotion Excellence	Première Division	Promotion Première	Deuxième Division	Promotion Deuxième	Troisième Division
Côte d'Opale (Pas-de-Calais)	Excellence	Première Division	Promotion Première	Deuxième Division	Promotion Deuxième	Troisième Division	Quatrième Division
Escaut (Nord)	Excellence	Promotion Excellence	Première Division	Promotion Première Division	Deuxième Division	Promotion Deuxième Division	Troisième Division	Quatrième Division
Flandre (Nord)	Preligue	Excellence	Promotion	Première Division	Deuxième Division
Maritime Nord (Nord)	Excellence	Première Division	Deuxième Division	Troisième Division	Quatrième Division

League of Haute-Normandie

Departmental districts	Level 10	Level 11	Level 12	Level 13	Level 14
Eure	Excellence	Promotion Excellence	Première Division	Deuxième Division	Troisième Division
Maritime (Seine-Maritime)	Elite	Excellence	Honneur	Espoir
Fluvial (Seine-Maritime)	Première Division	Deuxième Division	Troisième Division
Vallées (Seine-Maritime)	Première Division	Deuxième Division	Troisième Division

League of Paris Île-de-France

Clubs in the arrondissements of Paris are divided between the three surrounding suburban districts. The District of Hauts-de-Seine includes 6th, 7th, 8th, 14th, 15th, 16th and 17th, the District of Seine-Saint-Denis has the 9th, 10th, 11th, 18th, 19th, 20th and the District of Val-de-Marne includes 1st, 2nd, 3rd, 4th, 5th, 12th and 13th.

Départemental districts	Level 10	Level 11	Level 12	Level 13	Level 14	Level 15
Essonne	Excellence	Première Division	Deuxième Division	Troisième Division	Quatrième Division
Hauts-de-Seine	Excellence	Première Division	Deuxième Division	Troisième Division	Quatrième Division	Cinquième Division
Seine-et-Marne Nord (Seine-et-Marne)	Excellence	Première Division	Deuxième Division	Championnat Unique
Seine-et-Marne Sud (Seine-et-Marne)	Excellence	Première Division	Deuxième Division	Troisième Division
Seine-Saint-Denis	Excellence	Première Division	Deuxième Division	Troisième Division	Quatrième Division
Val d'Oise	Excellence	Première Division	Deuxième Division	Troisième Division	Quatrième Division
Val-de-Marne	Excellence	Première Division	Deuxième Division	Troisième Division	Quatrième Division
Yvelines	Excellence	Division 1	Division 2	Division 3	Division 4	Division 5

League of Picardy

Departmental districts	Level 9	Level 10	Level 11	Level 12	Level 13	Level 14	Level 15
Aisne	Départemental 1	Départemental 2	Départemental 3	Départemental 4	Départemental 5
Oise	Départemental 1	Départemental 2	Départemental 3	Départemental 4	Départemental 5	Départemental 6
Somme	Départemental 1	Départemental 2	Départemental 3	Départemental 4	Départemental 5	Départemental 6	Départemental 7

League of Rhône-Alpes

Départemental districts	Level 9	Level 10	Level 11	Level 12	Level 13	Level 14
Ain	Excellence	Promotion Excellence	Première Division	Deuxième Division	Troisième Division	Quatrième Division
Drôme-Ardèche	Excellence	Promotion Excellence	Première Division	Deuxième Division	Troisième Division	Quatrième Division
Isère	Excellence	Promotion Excellence	Première Division	Deuxième Division	Troisième Division	Quatrième Division
Loire	Excellence	Promotion Excellence	Première Division	Deuxième Division	Troisième Division
Rhône	Excellence	Promotion Excellence	Première Division	Deuxième Division	Troisième Division
Savoie	Excellence	Promotion Excellence	Première Division	Deuxième Division	Troisième Division
Haute-Savoie et Pays Gex	Excellence	Promotion Excellence	Première Division	Deuxième Division	Troisième Division

== Women ==
=== National leagues ===
From 2023–24 onwards :

Level	League(s)/Division(s)	
1	Première Ligue; 12 clubs	
2	Seconde Ligue; 12 clubs	
3	Division 3 Féminine; 24 clubs divided into 2 groups	
3	Group A 12 clubs	Group B 12 clubs
4	Alsace Honneur, Aquitaine Honneur, Atlantique Honneur, Auvergne Honneur, Lower Normandy Honneur, Burgundy Honneur, Brittany Honneur, Centre Honneur, Centre-Ouest Honneur, Champagne-Ardenne Honneur, Corsica Honneur, Franche-Comté Honneur, Languedoc-Roussillon Honneur, Lorraine Honneur, Maine Honneur, Provence Honneur, Midi-Pyrénées Honneur, Nord-Pas-de-Calais Honneur, Upper Normandy Honneur, Paris Honneur, Picardy Honneur, Rhône-Alpes Honneur	
