= Arres =

- Municipality
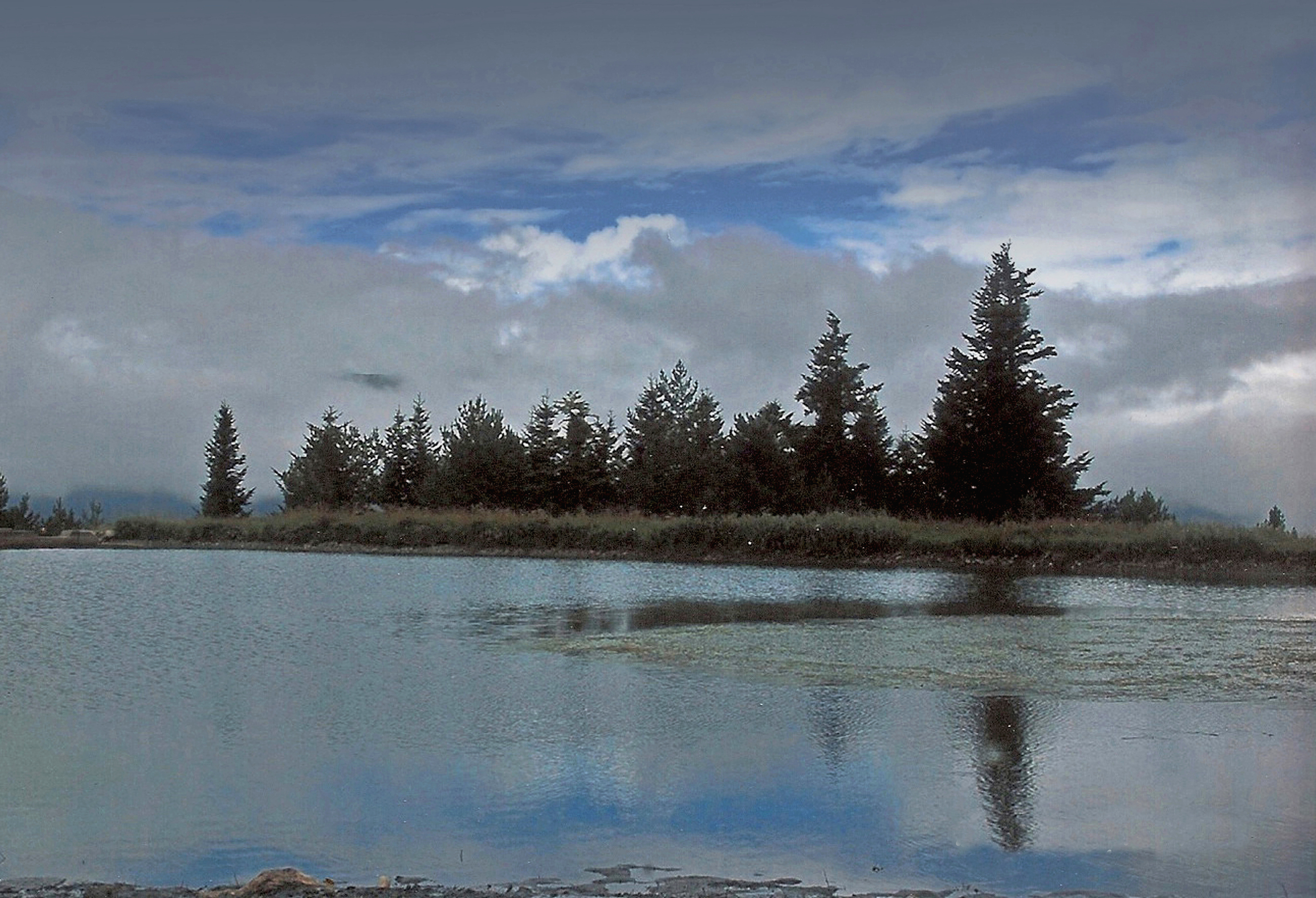
- Arres reservoir

- Coat of arms

- Location in Aran

- Location in Catalonia
- Coordinates: 42.7569°N 0.712222°E
- Country: Spain
- Community: Catalonia
- Province: Lleida
- Entity: Aran
- Terçon: Irissa

Government
  - Mayor: Pere Castet Farré (2015) (CDA)

Area
  - Total: 11.6 km^{2} (4.5 sq mi)

Population (2025-01-01)
  - Total: 58
  - Density: 5.0/km^{2} (13/sq mi)
- Website: www.arres.ddl.net

Arres (Occitan pronunciation: [ˈares]) is a municipality in western Aran, Province of Lleida, Catalonia, Spain. It had 61 inhabitants as of 2022. It is located in the terçon of Irissa.

It has a population of 58 (register office, 2025).
