= Juzet-de-Luchon =

- Commune
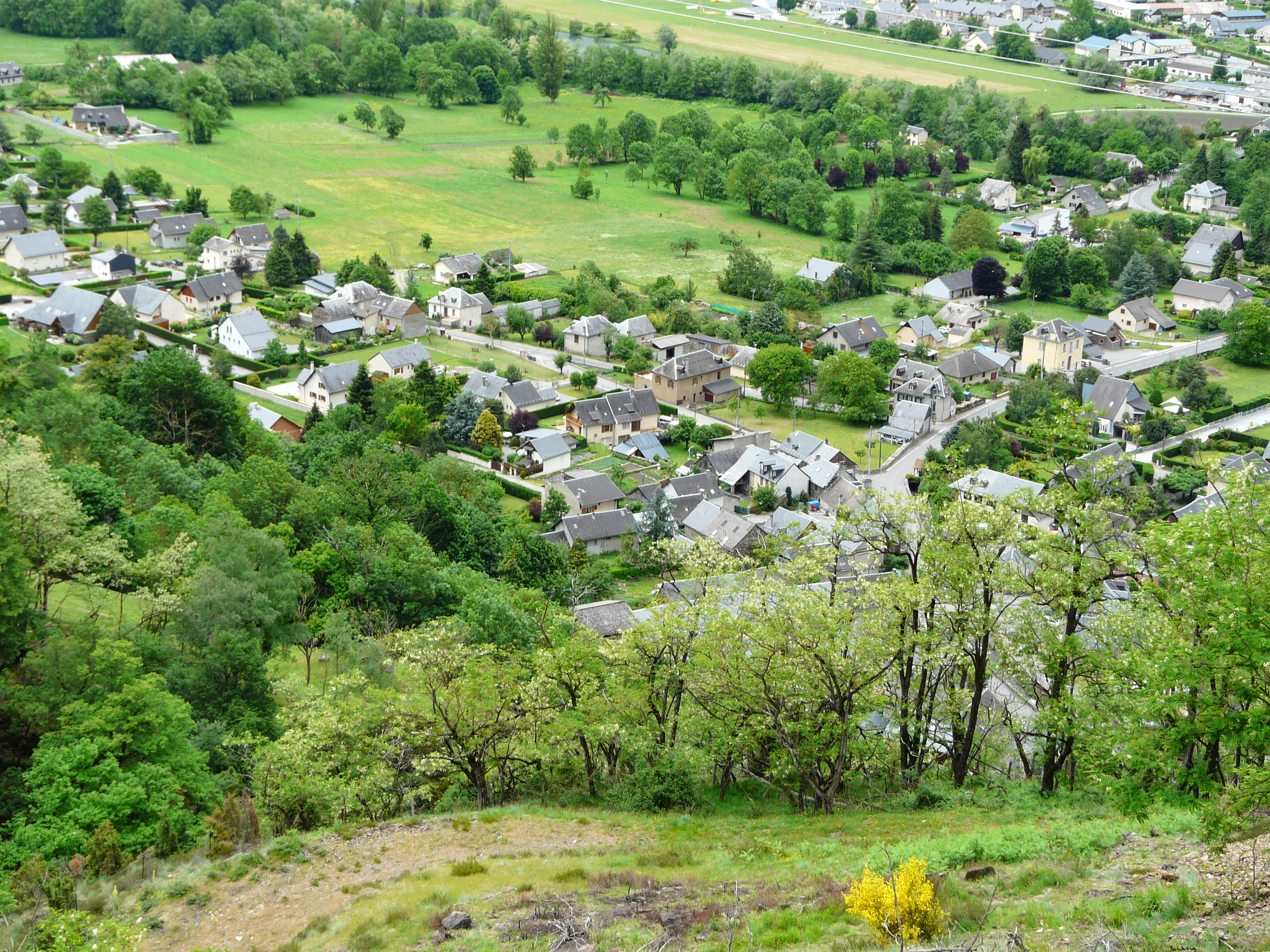
- A general view of Juzet-de-Luchon

- Coat of arms
- Location of Juzet-de-Luchon
- Location within France Location within Occitanie
- Coordinates: 42°48′34″N 0°36′35″E
- Country: France
- Region: Occitania
- Department: Haute-Garonne
- Arrondissement: Saint-Gaudens
- Canton: Bagnères-de-Luchon

Government
  - Mayor (2020–2026): Alain Lafontan
- Area^{1}: 6.8 km^{2} (2.6 sq mi)
- Elevation: 625 m (2,051 ft)
- Highest elevation: 2,000 m (6,600 ft)
- Lowest elevation: 608 m (1,995 ft)
- Population (2023): 366
  - Density: 54/km^{2} (140/sq mi)
- Time zone: UTC+01:00 (CET)
  - Summer (DST): UTC+02:00 (CEST)
- INSEE/Postal code: 31244 /31110
- ^{1} French Land Register data, which excludes lakes, ponds, glaciers > 1 km^{2} (0.386 sq mi or 247 acres) and river estuaries.

Juzet-de-Luchon (French pronunciation: [ʒyzɛ də lyʃɔ̃]; Occitan: Judèth de Luishon) is a commune in the Haute-Garonne department in southwestern France.

== Population ==
Historical population
Year	Pop.	±% p.a.
1968	223	—
1975	249	+1.59%
1982	286	+2.00%
1990	331	+1.84%
1999	379	+1.52%
2007	389	+0.33%
2012	384	−0.26%
2017	369	−0.79%
2023	366	−0.14%
Source: INSEE

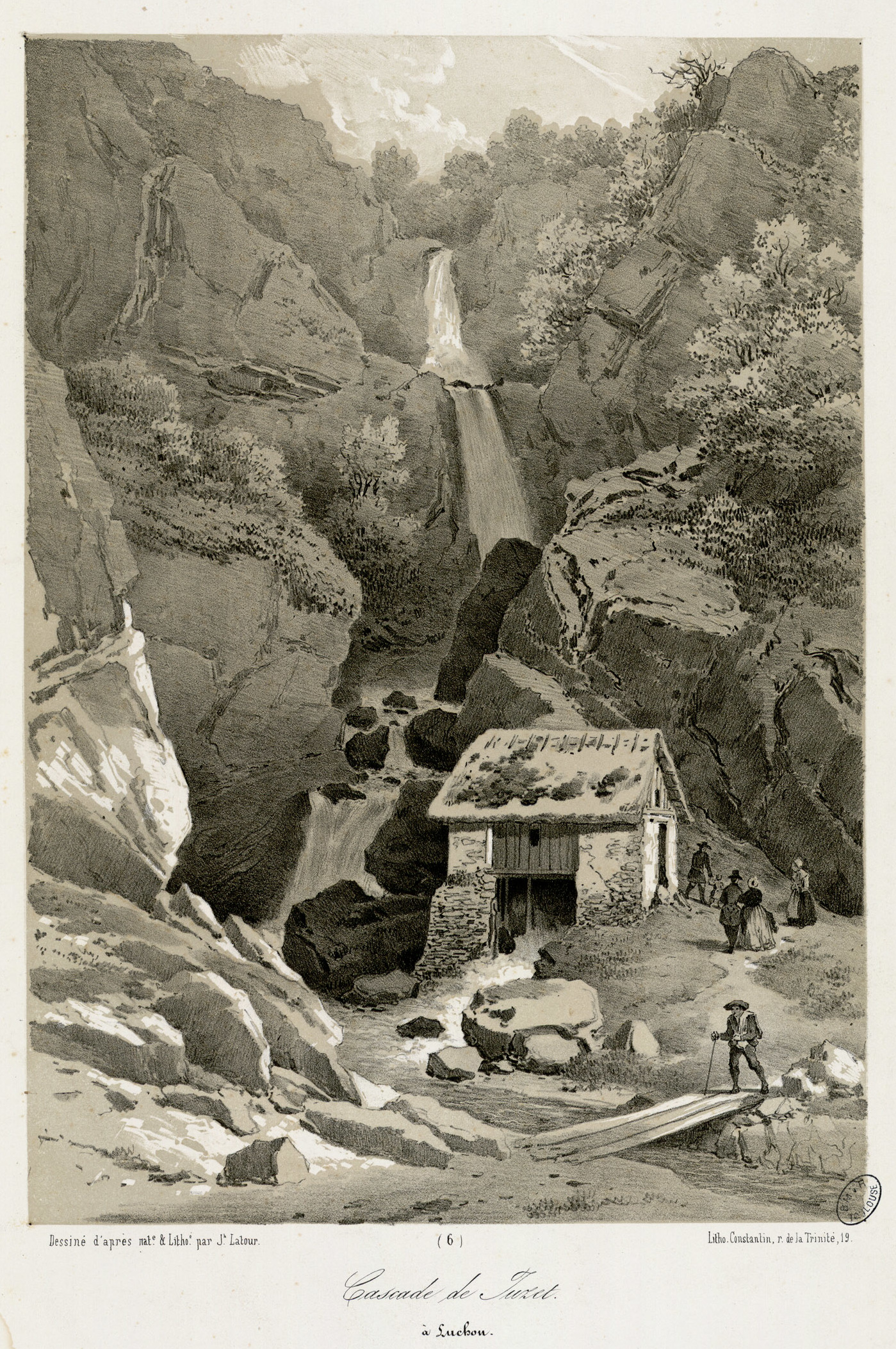
Juzet-de-Luchon Cascade, by Joseph Latour.

== See also ==
Communes of the Haute-Garonne department
