= Bausen =

- Municipality
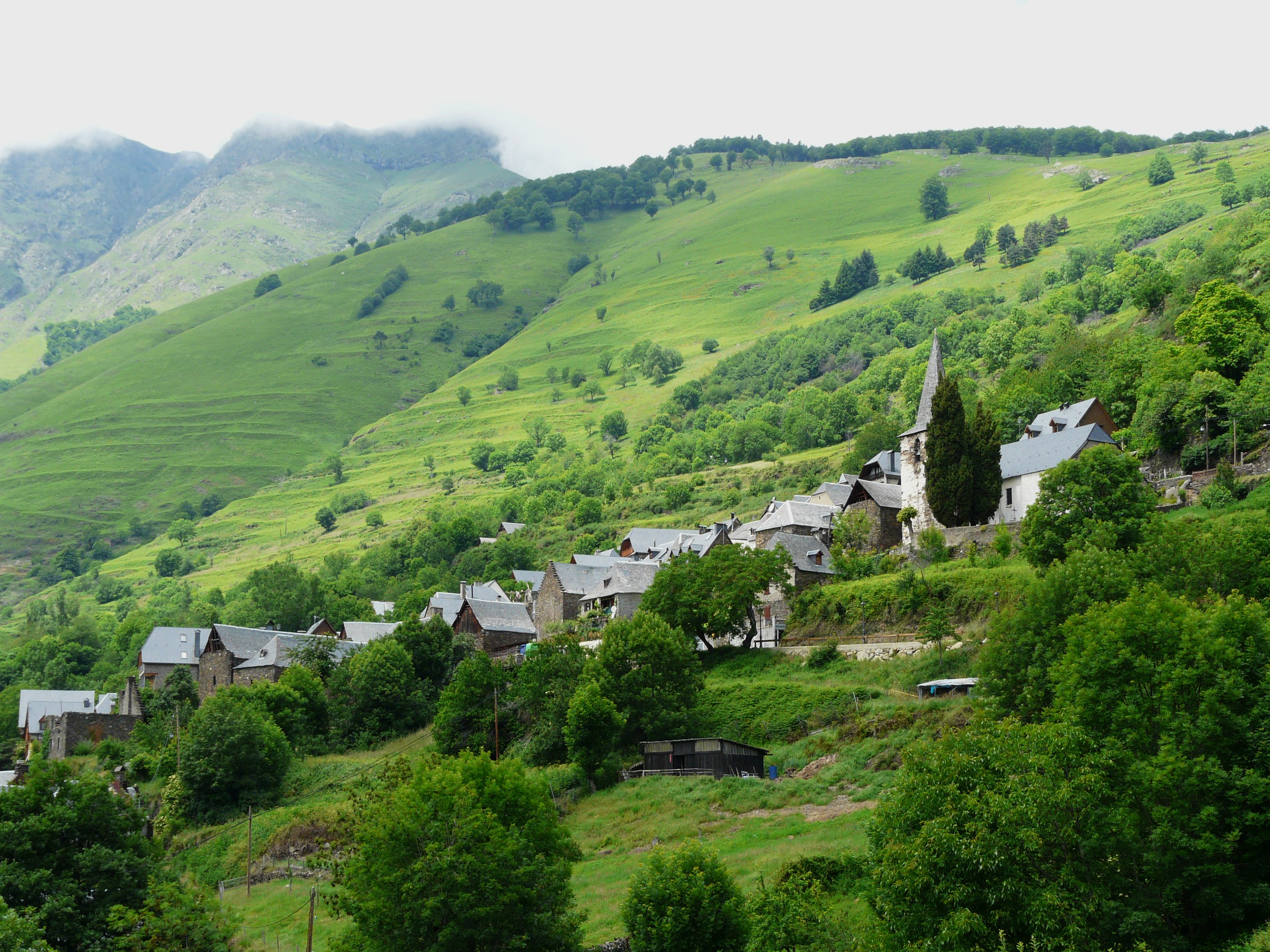
- Bausen

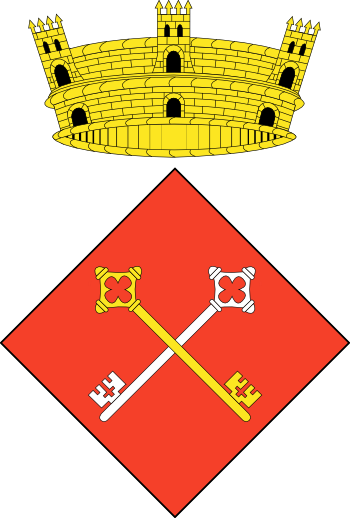
- Coat of arms

- Location in Aran

- Location in Catalonia
- Coordinates: 42.8347°N 0.717778°E
- Country: Spain
- Community: Catalonia
- Province: Lleida
- Entity: Aran
- Terçon: Quate Lòcs

Government
  - Mayor: José Antonio Barés Martín (2019) (CDA)

Area
  - Total: 17.7 km^{2} (6.8 sq mi)

Population (2025-01-01)
  - Total: 62
  - Density: 3.5/km^{2} (9.1/sq mi)
- Website: bausen.ddl.net

Bausen (Occitan pronunciation: [bawˈzen]) is a municipality in the northwest of Aran, Province of Lleida, Catalonia, Spain. It has a population of 62 (register office, 2025). It is located in the terçon of Quate Lòcs.
