= Antignac, Haute-Garonne =

Antignac Antinhac (Occitan)
- Commune
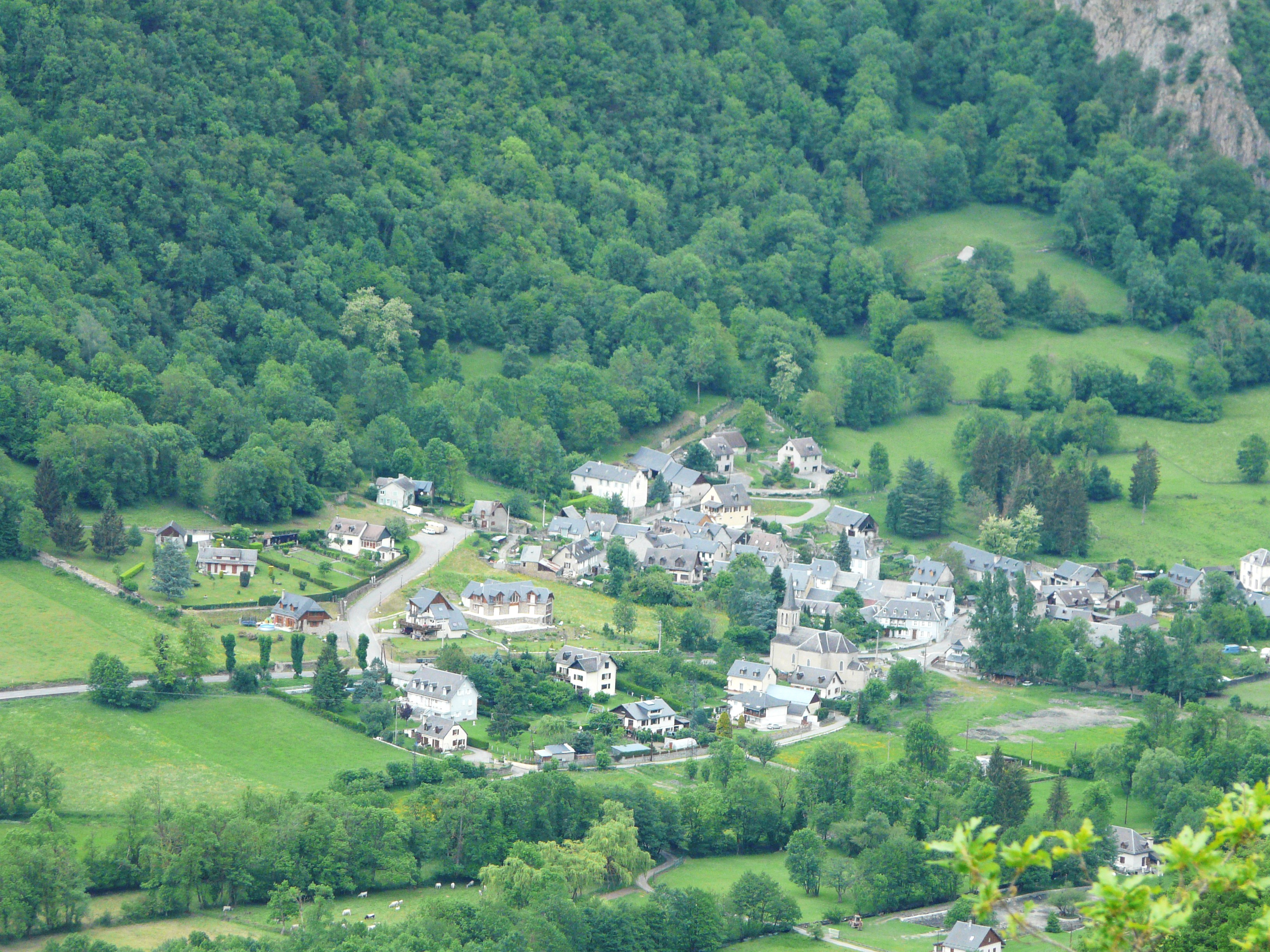
- A general view of Antignac
- Location of Antignac
- Location within France Location within Occitanie
- Coordinates: 42°49′36″N 0°36′02″E
- Country: France
- Region: Occitania
- Department: Haute-Garonne
- Arrondissement: Saint-Gaudens
- Canton: Bagnères-de-Luchon

Government
  - Mayor (2020–2026): Sylvain Comet
- Area^{1}: 5.80 km^{2} (2.24 sq mi)
- Elevation: 601 m (1,972 ft)
- Highest elevation: 1,846 m (6,056 ft)
- Lowest elevation: 589 m (1,932 ft)
- Population (2023): 83
  - Density: 14/km^{2} (37/sq mi)
- Time zone: UTC+01:00 (CET)
  - Summer (DST): UTC+02:00 (CEST)
- INSEE/Postal code: 31010 /31110
- ^{1} French Land Register data, which excludes lakes, ponds, glaciers > 1 km^{2} (0.386 sq mi or 247 acres) and river estuaries.

Antignac (French pronunciation: [ɑ̃tiɲak]; Occitan: Antinhac) is a commune in the Haute-Garonne department in southwestern France.

== Population ==
Historical population
Year	Pop.	±% p.a.
1968	61	—
1975	63	+0.46%
1982	55	−1.92%
1990	94	+6.93%
1999	100	+0.69%
2007	103	+0.37%
2012	108	+0.95%
2017	116	+1.44%
2023	83	−5.43%
Source: INSEE

== See also ==
- Communes of the Haute-Garonne department
