= 2016–17 Sloboda Užice season =

Sloboda Užice
2016–17 season
- Chairman: Josip Ristanović
- Manager: Predrag Ristanović
- Stadium: Užice City Stadium
- Serbian First League: 3rd
- Serbian Cup: Quarter–Finals
- Top goalscorer: League: Uroš Đerić (19); All: Uroš Đerić (23)
- Highest home attendance: 4,000 vs Mačva (5 March 2017)
- Lowest home attendance: 400 vs Dinamo Vranje (21 May 2017)
- Average home league attendance: 1,214
Home colours	Away colours

The 2016–17 season will be Sloboda Užice's 3rd consecutive season in the Serbian First League. Originally the club was meant to be playing in the Serbian League West with finishing 13th the previous season, but due to the exclusion of Sloga PM the club kept their First League status. The pre-season started on 11 July.

== Transfers ==
=== In ===
Date	Pos.	Name	From	Fee
1 July 2016	DF	(Serbia) Milan Joksimović	(Serbia) Jedinstvo Putevi	Free
1 July 2016	GK	(Serbia) Dalibor Divac	(Serbia) Loznica	Free
10 July 2016	FW	(Nigeria) Samuel Nnamani	(Serbia) Donji Srem	Free
11 July 2016	FW	(Serbia) Nikola Nešović	(Serbia) Napredak Kruševac	Free
15 July 2016	FW	(Bosnia and Herzegovina) Uroš Đerić	(Serbia) Mladost Lučani	Free
15 July 2016	FW	(Serbia) Marko Vasiljević	(Serbia) Vršac	Free
18 July 2016	FW	(Serbia) Vuk Kostić	(Serbia) Srem Jakovo	Free
18 July 2016	MF	(Serbia) Aleksa Vujić	(Serbia) Sopot	Free
19 July 2016	FW	(Serbia) Neven Radaković	(Serbia) Banat Zrenjanin	Free
19 July 2016	FW	(Serbia) Dobrivoje Velemir	(Greece) AEK Athens	Free
21 July 2016	MF	(Montenegro) Bojan Bigović	(Bosnia and Herzegovina) Leotar	Free
1 August 2016	DF	(Serbia) Nikola Stojanov	(Serbia) Javor Ivanjica	Loan
1 August 2016	MF	(Serbia) Nemanja Živković	(Serbia) Javor Ivanjica	Loan
1 August 2016	DF	(Serbia) Aleksandar Petrović	(Montenegro) Mornar	Free
20 August 2016	DF	(Serbia) Momčilo Rudan	(North Macedonia) Sileks	Free
23 August 2016	MF	(Serbia) Stefan Vukmirović	(Serbia) Borac Čačak	Free
12 January 2017	GK	(Serbia) Uroš Đurić	(Serbia) Sopot	Free
12 January 2017	MF	(Montenegro) Boris Došljak	(Montenegro) Lovćen	Free
16 January 2017	DF	(Serbia) Rade Glišović	(Montenegro) Rudar Pljevlja	Free
20 January 2017	MF	(Serbia) Branislav Stanić	(Serbia) Kolubara	Free
24 January 2017	MF	(Serbia) Sreten Atanasković	(Serbia) Dolina Padina	Free
24 January 2017	MF	(Serbia) Nenad Cvetković	(Serbia) Zlatibor	Free

=== Out ===
Date	Pos.	Name	To	Fee
1 July 2016	MF	(Serbia) Vuk Đurić	(Serbia) Sloga Bajina Bašta	Free
1 July 2016	FW	(Serbia) Nikola Čumić	(Serbia) Metalac GM	Free
1 July 2016	FW	(Serbia) Nebojša Vukojičić	(Serbia) Mokra Gora	Free
10 July 2016	DF	(Serbia) Filip Babić	(Serbia) Proleter	Free
15 July 2016	GK	(Serbia) Luka Radojičić	(Serbia) Sloga Bajina Bašta	Loan
18 July 2016	FW	(Serbia) Dejan Đorđević	(Malta) Birkirkara	Free
24 July 2016	MF	(Serbia) Nikola D.Tasić	(Serbia) Jagodina	Free
25 July 2016	FW	(Serbia) Nikola Šalipur	(Serbia) FAP	Loan
20 August 2016	FW	(Serbia) Vuk Kostić	(Serbia) Drina Ljubovija	Free
24 August 2016	MF	(Serbia) Dino Dolmagić	(Serbia) Inđija	Free
1 January 2017	MF	(Serbia) Stefan Vukmirović	(Malaysia) Kuantan FA	Free
11 January 2017	MF	(Serbia) Dalibor Divac	(Serbia) Zlatibor	Free
11 January 2017	DF	(Serbia) Marko Marjanović	(Serbia) Zlatibor	Free
15 January 2017	MF	(Serbia) Milan Milanović	(Serbia) Javor Ivanjica	Free
16 January 2017	DF	(Serbia) Aleksandar Petrović	(Serbia) Srem Jakovo	Free
16 January 2017	MF	(Serbia) Mirko Petrović	(Serbia) Sevojno	Free
20 January 2017	DF	(Serbia) Nikola Vučković	(Serbia) Jedinstvo Putevi	Loan
20 January 2017	DF	(Serbia) Momčilo Rudan	(Serbia) Bratstvo Prigrevica	Free
20 January 2017	MF	(Montenegro) Bojan Bigović	(Montenegro) Igalo	Free

== Friendlies ==
Date	Opponents	H / A	Result F–A
20 July 2016	Zlatibor Čajetina	H	0-0
22 July 2016	Partizan (II)	N	4-2
23 July 2016	FAP	N	1-0
25 July 2016	Lovćen	N	0-1
28 July 2016	Šumadija 1903	N	2-0
3 August 2016	Polimlje	N	5-0
6 August 2016	Sloga Požega	H	1-1

== Fixtures ==
Date	Opponents	H / A	Result F–A	Scorers	Attendance	League position
13 August 2016	Mačva	A	1–2	Vujić 83'	1,500	11th
20 August 2016	Inđija	A	1–0	Đerić 19'	300	9th
27 August 2016	Zemun	H	0–0		1,000	7th
3 September 2016	Proleter	A	0–0		500	9th
11 September 2016	Radnički Pirot	H	1–0	Nešović 71'	1,000	7th
17 September 2016	Kolubara	A	1–1	Đerić 26'	300	6th
25 September 2016	OFK Odžaci	H	1–0	Đerić 66'	800	4th
1 October 2016	BSK	A	2–0	Đerić 12', Nnamani 19'	800	3rd
8 October 2016	ČSK Čelarevo	H	4–2	Nikolić (2) 42', 50', Đerić (2) 73', 80'	1,500	3rd
15 October 2016	Sinđelić	A	2–1	Đerić (2) 16', 71' (pen.)	500	2nd
22 October 2016	OFK Beograd	H	1–0	Đerić 45'	1,500	2nd
30 October 2016	Budućnost Dobanovci	A	1–1	Vujić 28'	800	2nd
5 November 2016	Jagodina	H	3–1	Nnamani 21', Vujić 30', Đerić 53'	1,000	2nd
13 November 2016	Dinamo Vranje	A	0–1		2,000	2nd
19 November 2016	Bežanija	H	2–2	Đerić (2) 19', 40'	2,000	2nd
5 March 2017	Mačva	H	1–1	Đerić 57'	4,000	2nd
11 March 2017	Inđija	H	1–2	Nnamani 11'	1,500	2nd
19 March 2017	Zemun	A	1–2	Nešović 65'	1,000	2nd
25 March 2017	Proleter	H	3–1	Miličić 40', Đerić (2) 53', 76	800	2nd
1 April 2017	Radnički Pirot	A	0–0		1,500	2nd
9 April 2017	Kolubara	H	3–1	Vidić 74', Đerić 79', Nnamani 88'	1,000	2nd
15 April 2017	OFK Odžaci	A	1–0	Nešović 90+3'	400	2nd
22 April 2017	BSK	H	2–1	Đerić 18', Miličić 27'	750	2nd
29 April 2017	ČSK Čelarevo	A	0–0		200	3rd
3 May 2017	Sinđelić	H	2–0	Nnamani 24', Došljak 57'	800	3rd
8 May 2017	OFK Beograd	A	3–1	Došljak 13', Emerun 32', Nešović 66'	300	3rd
13 May 2017	Budućnost Dobanovci	H	4–0	Emerun 23', Đerić (2) 57', 88', Nešović 90'	1,000	3rd
17 May 2017	Jagodina	A	0–3		200	3rd
21 May 2017	Dinamo Vranje	H	1–1	Došljak 52'	400	3rd
27 May 2017	Bežanija	A	1–4	Miličić 18'	300	3rd

=== League table ===
Pos	Club	Pld	W	D	L	GF	GA	GD	Pts
2	Zemun (P)	30	17	10	3	44	18	+26	61
3	Sloboda Užice	30	15	9	6	43	28	+15	54
4	Inđija	30	14	6	10	34	30	+4	48

Pld = Matches played; W = Matches won; D = Matches drawn; L = Matches lost; GF = Goals for; GA = Goals against; GD = Goal difference; Pts = Points

== Serbian Cup ==
Date	Round	Opponents	H / A	Result F–A	Scorers	Attendance
7 September 2016	Preliminary Round	Trepča	A	3–0	Đerić (2), Nešović	150
21 September 2016	First Round	OFK Beograd	H	6–1	Đerić (2) 54' (pen.), 90+1', Nešović (4) 64', 67', 69', 77'	1,000
26 October 2016	Second Round	Radnik Surdulica	A	2–1	Nnamani 64', Vidić 85'	800
5 April 2017	Quarter–Finals	Čukarički	H	0–3		600

== Squad statistics ==
As of 27 May 2017

No.	Name	League		Cup		Total		Discipline	
No.	Name	Apps	Goals	Apps	Goals	Apps	Goals	Yellow card	Red card
Goalkeepers
1	(Serbia) Nikola Tasić	17	0	2	0	19	0	2	0
12	(Serbia) Uroš Đurić	12	0	1	0	13	0	0	0
25	(Serbia) Marko Ristanović	0(1)	0	0	0	0(1)	0	0	0
Defenders
3	(Serbia) Nikola Vučković	0(5)	0	0	0	0(5)	0	1	0
11	(Serbia) Milan Joksimović	29	0	4	0	33	0	4	0
21	(Serbia) Rade Glišović	8(2)	0	0	0	8(2)	0	1	0
23	(Serbia) Bogdan Miličić	27	3	4	0	31	3	4	0
29	(Serbia) Aleksa Vidić	23	1	3	1	26	2	7	0
44	(Serbia) Miloš Nikolić	23	2	4	0	27	2	8	1
Midfielders
4	(Serbia) Aleksa Vujić	22	3	2(1)	0	24(1)	3	4	0
6	(Serbia) Aleksandar Mitrović	1	0	1	0	2	0	1	0
8	(Serbia) Dobrivoje Velemir	6(11)	0	2	0	8(11)	0	5	0
13	(Serbia) Sreten Atanasković	13	0	1	0	14	0	0	0
15	(Montenegro) Boris Došljak	13(1)	3	1	0	14(1)	3	2	0
21	(Serbia) Nenad Cvetković	3(1)	0	0(1)	0	3(2)	0	0	0
79	(Serbia) Milan Jeremić	20(3)	0	3	0	23(3)	0	8	0
88	(Serbia) Branislav Stanić	4(7)	0	0(1)	0	4(8)	0	2	0
Forwards
7	(Nigeria) Emeka Emerun	5(12)	2	0(1)	0	5(13)	2	3	0
9	(Serbia) Marko Vasiljević	0	0	1	0	1	0	0	0
9	(Serbia) Branko Radović	1(3)	0	0(1)	0	1(4)	0	0	0
10	(Serbia) Nikola Nešović	22(6)	5	4	5	26(6)	10	0	0
33	(Nigeria) Samuel Nnamani	17(7)	5	2(1)	1	19(8)	6	2	0
55	(Bosnia and Herzegovina) Uroš Đerić	28	19	3	4	31	23	2	0
66	(Serbia) Igor Vučićević	0(1)	0	0	0	0(1)	0	0	0
77	(Serbia) Luka Slavković	1(1)	0	0	0	1(1)	0	0	0
99	(Montenegro) Balša Peličić	2(6)	0	0	0	2(6)	0	0	0
Players who left during the season
12	(Serbia) Dalibor Divac	1	0	1	0	2	0	0	0
2	(Serbia) Marko Marjanović	4(1)	0	1(2)	0	5(3)	0	1	0
5	(Serbia) Aleksandar Petrović	4(2)	0	0(1)	0	4(3)	0	2	0
6	(Serbia) Momčilo Rudan	1	0	0	0	1	0	0	0
15	(Serbia) Milan Milanović	12(1)	0	2	0	14(1)	0	3	0
20	(Montenegro) Bojan Bigović	0(1)	0	0(1)	0	0(2)	0	0	0
21	(Serbia) Neven Radaković	0(3)	0	0(1)	0	0(4)	0	0	0
99	(Serbia) Stefan Vukmirović	11	0	2	0	13	0	2	0
