= 2012–13 Sloboda Užice season =

Sloboda Užice
2012–13 season
- Chairman: Dragan Subotić
- Manager: Ljubiša Stamenković
- Stadium: Užice City Stadium
- Serbian SuperLiga: 5th
- Serbian Cup: First Round
- Top goalscorer: League: Ranđelović (18); All: Ranđelović (18)
- Highest home attendance: 10,000 vs Red Star (25 November 2012)
- Lowest home attendance: 1,000 vs Inđija (29 September 2012)
- Average home league attendance: 3,207
Home colours	Away colours	Third colours

The 2012–13 season was Sloboda Užice's 3rd consecutive season in the Serbian SuperLiga. Pre-season started on 9 July 2012. Sloboda kicked off the season at home against Spartak ZV on 11 August. The first away game was against BSK Borča on 18 August.

== Transfers ==
=== In ===
Date	Pos.	Name	From	Fee
9 July 2012	FW	(Bosnia and Herzegovina) Duško Stajić	(Bosnia and Herzegovina) Borac Banja Luka	Free
9 July 2012	DF	(Serbia) Darko Lovrić	(Israel) Hapoel Ashkelon	Free
9 July 2012	GK	(Serbia) Dejan Ranković	(Serbia) Smederevo	Free
9 July 2012	MF	(Serbia) Miloš Janićijević	(Serbia) Sloga Kraljevo	Free
9 July 2012	MF	(Serbia) Zoran Knežević	(Russia) Gazovik Orenburg	Free
9 July 2012	MF	(Bosnia and Herzegovina) Dario Purić	(Bosnia and Herzegovina) Čelik Zenica	Free
31 August 2012	DF	(Bosnia and Herzegovina) Ajdin Maksumić	(Switzerland) FC Staad	Free
9 February 2013	DF	(Bosnia and Herzegovina) Delimir Bajić	(Cyprus) Olympiakos Nicosia	Free
27 February 2013	MF	(Tajikistan) Nuriddin Davronov	(Tajikistan) Istiqlol Dushanbe	Free
9 February 2013	FW	(Nigeria) Daniel Olerum	(Iran) Aboomoslem	Free
1 April 2013	MF	(Guinea) Kalla Toure	(Republic of the Congo) Étoile du Congo	Free

=== Out ===
Date	Pos.	Name	To	Fee
1 June 2012	MF	(Ghana) Francis Bossman	(Azerbaijan) Ravan Baku	Free
1 July 2012	MF	(Serbia) Vojislav Vranjković	(Montenegro) Čelik Nikšić	Free
1 July 2012	GK	(Montenegro) Darko Božović	(Iran) Zob Ahan Isfahan	Free
1 July 2012	DF	(Liberia) Omega Roberts	(Serbia) Smederevo	Free
1 August 2012	DF	(Bosnia and Herzegovina) Jovan Vujanić	(Bosnia and Herzegovina) Modriča	Loan
31 December 2012	MF	(Bosnia and Herzegovina) Duško Stajić	(Bosnia and Herzegovina) Čelik Zenica	Free
31 December 2012	DF	(Bosnia and Herzegovina) Ajdin Maksumić	(Bosnia and Herzegovina) GOŠK Gabela	Free
31 December 2012	GK	(Serbia) Bojan Šejić	(Serbia) Sloga Kraljevo	Free
31 December 2012	MF	(Serbia) Bojan Beljić	(Serbia) FK Radnički 1923	Free
1 February 2013	DF	(Bosnia and Herzegovina) Slavko Marić	(Serbia) Radnički 1923	Free
5 February 2013	MF	(Serbia) Savo Kovačević	(Switzerland) FC St. Gallen	Free
9 February 2013	DF	(Serbia) Slavko Ćulibrk	(North Macedonia) Rabotnički	Free

== Fixtures ==
Round

11 August 2012 1	Sloboda Užice	2 - 0	Spartak ZV	Užice
17:30 CET	Kovačević 37'; Ranđelović 81'	Report		Stadium: Begluk; Attendance: 2,000; Referee: Danilo Grujić

18 August 2012 2	BSK	1 - 0	Sloboda Užice	Belgrade
17:30 CET	Savković 12'	Report		Stadium: Vizelj Park; Attendance: 400; Referee: Majo Vujović

25 August 2012 3	Sloboda Užice	2 - 2	Donji Srem	Užice
17:00 CET	Ranđelović 36'; Stajić 40'	Report	Damjanović 7'; Petković 93'	Stadium: Begluk; Attendance: 4000; Referee: Milan Karadžić

1 September 2012 4	Jagodina	2 - 0	Sloboda Užice	Jagodina
17:00 CET	Stojanović 87'; Lepović 90+4'	Report		Stadium: Stadion pod Đurđevim brdom Attendance: 1,500; Referee: Miodrag Gogić

15 September 2012 5	Sloboda Užice	4 - 3	OFK Beograd	Užice
16:30 CET	Galvão 4', 48'; Ranđelović 41'; Beljić 78'	Report	Jovanović 11', 29'; Tufegdžić 86'	Stadium: Begluk; Attendance: 2,000; Referee: Vlado Glođović

22 September 2012 6	Partizan	5 - 0	Sloboda Užice	Belgrade
16:30 CET	Marković 20'; Ninković 38'; Šćepović 68', 90'; Ivanov 77'	Report		Stadium: JNA; Attendance: 3,273; Referee: Aleksandar Vasić

29 September 2012 7	Sloboda Užice	2 - 1	Hajduk Kula	Užice
15:30 CET	Galvão 33', 72'	Report	Veselinović 28'	Stadium: Begluk; Attendance: 1,500; Referee: Srđan Obradović

7 October 2012 8	Sloboda Užice	1 - 1	Vojvodina	Užice
15:30 CET	Galvão 45'	Report	Bojović 65'	Stadium: Begluk; Attendance: 4,000; Referee: Dejan Filipović

20 October 2012 9	Javor	1 - 1	Sloboda Užice	Ivanjica
14:30 CET	Marić 82' (o.g.)	Report	Zoran Knežević 54'	Stadium: Stadion kraj Moravice; Attendance: 1,000; Referee: Novica Anđelovski

27 October 2012 10	Sloboda Užice	1 - 0	Rad	Užice
13:30 CET	Ranđelović 45+1'	Report		Stadium: Begluk; Attendance: 2,500; Referee: Milorad Mažić

3 November 2012 11	Novi Pazar	2 - 2	Sloboda Užice	Novi Pazar
13:30 CET	Damjanović 21'; Bogunović 85'	Report	Pilipović 29'; Ranđelović 69'	Stadium: Gradski stadion Attendance: closed to the public Referee: Slobodan Veselinović

10 November 2012 12	Sloboda Užice	0 - 0	Radnički Niš	Užice
13:30 CET		Report		Stadium: Begluk; Attendance: 2,000; Referee: Novica Anđelovski

18 November 2012 13	Radnički 1923	0 - 2	Sloboda Užice	Kragujevac
13:00 CET		Report	Ranđelović 22'; Purić 50'	Stadium: Čika Dača; Attendance: 2,000; Referee: Dejan Filipović

25 November 2012 14	Sloboda Užice	1 - 2	Red Star	Užice
13:00 CET	Purić 25'	Report	Mudrinski 85', 90+3'	Stadium: Begluk; Attendance: 10,000; Referee: Majo Vujović

1 December 2012 15	Smederevo	0 - 1	Sloboda Užice	Smederevo
13:00 CET		Report	Ranđelović 85'	Stadium: Stadion FK Smederevo; Attendance: 500; Referee: Vlado Glođović

27 February 2013 16	Spartak ZV	2 - 2	Sloboda Užice	Subotica
13:30 CET	Torbica 45'; Novaković 88'	Report	Ranđelović 56', 85'	Stadium: Stadion FK Smederevo; Attendance: 400; Referee: Danilo Grujić

2 March 2013 17	Sloboda Užice	1 - 0	BSK	Užice
14:00 CET	Gojković 35'	Report		Stadium: Begluk; Attendance: 2,500; Referee: Ninoslav Spasić

9 March 2013 18	Donji Srem	0 - 0	Sloboda Užice	Novi Sad
14:00 CET		Report		Stadium: Karađorđe; Attendance: 300; Referee: Dragan Krstić

23 March 2013 19	Sloboda Užice	1 - 1	Jagodina	Užice
14:30 CET	Galvão 30'	Report	Živanović 90'	Stadium: Begluk; Attendance: 3,500; Referee: Miodrag Gogić

30 March 2013 20	OFK Beograd	1 - 0	Sloboda Užice	Belgrade
14:30 CET	Vasiljević 86'	Report		Stadium: Karaburma; Attendance: 400; Referee: Dejan Santrač

4 April 2013 21	Sloboda Užice	0 - 0	Partizan	Užice
14:30 CET		Report		Stadium: Begluk; Attendance: 8,000; Referee: Novica Anđelovski

7 April 2013 22	Hajduk Kula	3 - 3	Sloboda Užice	Kula
15:30 CET	Veselinović 16'; Adamović 44'; Kiš 60'	Report	Ranđelović 22', 77'; Krstić 85'	Stadium: Stadion Hajduk; Attendance: 2,000; Referee: Milan Jeremić

13 April 2013 23	Vojvodina	2 - 2	Sloboda Užice	Novi Sad
17:00 CET	Alivodić 10'; Vranješ 66'	Report	Piliović 30'; Vasilić 52'	Stadium: Karađorđe; Attendance: 6,000; Referee: Danilo Grujić

21 April 2013 24	Sloboda Užice	2 - 2	Javor	Užice
16:00 CET	Ranđelović 27'; Galvão 45'	Report	Momčilović 20'; Radivojević 75'	Stadium: Begluk; Attendance: 2,500; Referee: Darko Bogdanović

27 April 2013 25	Rad	2 - 0	Sloboda Užice	Belgrade
16:00 CET	Luković 30'; Đorđević 58'		Report	Stadium: Banjice; Attendance: 800; Referee: Aleksandar Vasić

4 May 2013 26	Sloboda Užice	2 - 0	Novi Pazar	Užice
16:30 CET	Ranđelović 40', 69'	Report		Stadium: Begluk; Attendance: 3,000; Referee: Svetislav Marušić

11 May 2013 27	Radnički Niš	0 - 1	Sloboda Užice	Niš
17:00 CET		Report	Krstić 8'	Stadium: Čair; Attendance: 2,000; Referee: Aleksandar Vasić

18 May 2013 28	Sloboda Užice	0 - 2	Radnički 1923	Užice
17:00 CET		Report	Kovačević 21'; Milošković 65'	Stadium: Begluk; Attendance: 3,000; Referee: Milenko Vukadinović

22 May 2013 29	Red Star	1 - 2	Sloboda Užice	Belgrade
17:00 CET	Mudrinski 83'	Report	Ranđelović 33', 71'	Stadium: Marakana; Attendance: 4,930; Referee: Novica Anđelovski

26 May 2013 30	Sloboda Užice	4 - 1	Smederevo	Užice
17:00 CET	Galvão 14'; Ranđelović 18', 24'; Krstić 43'	Report	Živković 21'	Stadium: Begluk; Attendance: 2,000; Referee: Milenko Vukadinović

=== Results and positions by round ===
Round	1	2	3	4	5	6	7	8	9	10	11	12	13	14	15	16	17	18	19	20	21	22	23	24	25	26	27	28	29	30
Ground	H	A	H	A	H	A	H	H	A	H	A	H	A	H	A	A	H	A	H	A	H	A	A	H	A	H	A	H	A	H
Result	W	L	D	L	W	L	W	D	D	W	D	D	W	L	W	D	W	D	D	L	D	D	D	D	L	W	W	L	W	W
Position	3	9	9	10	7	8	9	9	8	6	7	7	7	8	7	6	6	6	6	6	6	6	6	6	7	7	6	7	6	5

Updated to match(es) played on 26 May 2013. Source: superliga.rs
A = Away; H = Home; W = Win; D = Draw; L = Loss

=== Serbian SuperLiga ===
Pos	Club	Pld	W	D	L	GF	GA	GD	Pts
4	Jagodina	30	15	5	10	35	26	+9	50
5	Sloboda Užice	30	11	12	7	39	37	+2	45
6	OFK Beograd	30	13	6	11	34	32	+2	45

Pld = Matches played; W = Matches won; D = Matches drawn; L = Matches lost; GF = Goals for; GA = Goals against; GD = Goal difference; Pts = Points

== Serbian Cup ==
Round

26 September 2012 1st Round	Sloboda Užice	0 - 1	Inđija	Užice
15:00 CET			Dimitrov 12'	Stadium: Begluk; Attendance: 1,000; Referee: Ninoslav Spasić

== Squad statistics ==
No.	Name	League		Cup		Total		Discipline	
No.	Name	Apps	Goals	Apps	Goals	Apps	Goals	Yellow card	Red card
Goalkeepers
1	(Serbia) Dejan Ranković	29	0	1	0	30	0	4	0
Left	(Serbia) Bojan Šejić	0	0	0	0	0	0	0	0
25	(Serbia) Nikola Tasić	1	0	0	0	1	0	0	0
Defenders
2	(Serbia) Jovica Vasilić^{(C)}	28	1	1	0	29	1	4	1
4	(Serbia) Lazar Ristanović	0	0	0	0	0	0	0	0
6	(Serbia) Nemanja Cvetković	0(1)	0	0	0	0(1)	0	0	0
Left	(Bosnia and Herzegovina) Slavko Marić	13	0	1	0	14	0	6	1
15	(Serbia) Aleksandar Gojković	19(4)	1	0	0	19(4)	1	3	0
31	(Serbia) Darko Lovrić	28	0	1	0	29	0	5	1
44	(Serbia) Mladen Lazarević	3(2)	0	0	0	3(2)	0	1	0
55	(Bosnia and Herzegovina) Delimir Bajić	15	0	0	0	15	0	3	0
Left	(Serbia) Slavko Ćulibrk	6(2)	0	0	0	6(2)	0	3	0
Left	(Bosnia and Herzegovina) Ajdin Maksumić	0	0	0	0	0	0	0	0
Midfielders
3	(Serbia) Aleksa Vidić	0	0	0	0	0	0	0	0
5	(Serbia) Zoran Knežević	24	1	1	0	25	1	8	0
8	(Serbia) Nikola Mitić	0	0	0	0	0	0	0	0
Left	(Serbia) Bojan Beljić	13	1	1	0	14	1	4	0
14	(Serbia) Miloš Janićijević	1(6)	0	0	0	1(6)	0	0	0
Left	(Bosnia and Herzegovina) Duško Stajić	4(8)	1	0	0	4(8)	1	1	0
10	(Tajikistan) Nuriddin Davronov	1(7)	0	0	0	1(7)	0	0	0
13	(Serbia) Aleksandar Pejović	24	0	1	0	25	0	6	0
16	(Serbia) Stojan Pilipović	23	2	1	0	24	2	8	0
17	(Bosnia and Herzegovina) Dario Purić	18(7)	2	0(1)	0	18(8)	2	4	0
18	(Serbia) Vladimir Krstić	11(7)	3	0(1)	0	11(8)	3	4	0
21	(Guinea) Kalla Toure	0(1)	0	0	0	0(1)	0	0	0
22	(Serbia) Mirko Petrović	0	0	0	0	0	0	0	0
Forwards
9	(Serbia) Predrag Ranđelović	28	18	1	0	29	18	5	1
11	(Serbia) Marko Memedović	3(17)	0	0(1)	0	3(18)	0	2	0
20	(Brazil) Thiago Galvão	30	8	1	0	31	8	3	0
Left	(Serbia) Savo Kovačević	3(5)	1	1	0	4(5)	1	1	0
23	(Nigeria) Daniel Olerum	2(4)	0	0	0	2(4)	0	0	0
33	(Serbia) Lazar Jovanović	1(10)	0	0	0	1(10)	0	0	0
