= Ristanović =

Ristanović (Serbian Cyrillic: Ристановић) is a Serbian surname. Notable people with the surname include:

- Dejan Ristanović (1963–2025), Serbian writer and computer publicist
- Miloš Ristanović (born 1982), Serbian football player
- Predrag Ristanović (born 1972), Serbian football player and manager
- Radivoje Ristanović (born 1982), Serbian-Montenegrin handball player
