= Milan Milanović (footballer, born 1995) =

Serbian footballer

Personal information
- Full name: Milan Milanović
- Date of birth: 21 January 1995 (age 31)
- Place of birth: Bajina Bašta, FR Yugoslavia
- Height: 1.84 m (6 ft 0 in)
- Positions: Centre back; defensive midfielder

Youth career
- Sloga Bajina Bašta
- 2010–2013: Red Star Belgrade
- 2013–2014: Sloboda Užice

Senior career*
Years	Team	Apps	(Gls)
2014–2016	Sloboda Užice	56	(4)
2017–2018	Javor Ivanjica	33	(0)
2019	Zlatibor Čajetina	14	(1)
2019	Novi Pazar	17	(0)
2020	Spartak Subotica		
2020–2021	Sloboda Užice		
- * Club domestic league appearances and goals as of 20:10, 1 November 2020 (UTC)

Milan Milanović (Serbian Cyrillic: Милан Милановић; born 21 January 1995) is a Serbian retired football defender.

== Club career ==
=== Career statistics ===
As of 19 November 2016

Club	Season	League		Cup		Continental		Total	
Club	Season	Apps	Goals	Apps	Goals	Apps	Goals	Apps	Goals
Sloboda	2014–15	16	0	0	0	0	0	16	0
Sloboda	2015–16	27	4	0	0	0	0	27	4
Sloboda	2016–17	13	0	2	0	0	0	15	0
Sloboda	Total	56	4	2	0	0	0	58	4
