= Nešović =

Nešović (Cyrillic script: Нешовић) is a Serbian surname. It may refer to:

- Aleksej Nešović (born 1985), basketball player
- Branko Nešović (1930–2002), footballer and physician
- Ivana Nešović (born 1988), volleyball player
- Nikola Nešović (born 1993), footballer
