= Stefan Vukmirović =

Serbian footballer

Personal information
- Full name: Stefan Vukmirović
- Date of birth: 19 July 1991 (age 35)
- Place of birth: Kragujevac, SFR Yugoslavia
- Height: 1.76 m (5 ft 9 1/2 in)
- Position: Attacking midfielder

Team information
- Current team: Nea Artaki

Youth career
- Šumadija Kragujevac

Senior career*
Years	Team	Apps	(Gls)
2009–2010	Radnički Kragujevac	0	(0)
2010–2011	BASK	9	(0)
2011–2012	Jagodina	1	(0)
2012–2013	Jedinstvo Putevi	36	(5)
2014	Napredak Kruševac	14	(0)
2014	Sloboda Užice	14	(0)
2015	Radnik Surdulica	12	(1)
2015–2016	Borac Čačak	26	(0)
2016	Sloboda Užice	11	(0)
2017	Kuantan FA	11	(0)
2017	Sloga Simin Han	4	(0)
2017–2018	Tuzla	32	(2)
2019	Karaiskakis	17	(0)
2019–2020	Kalamata	12	(1)
2020	Ionikos	6	(0)
2020–2021	Francavilla	11	(0)
2021	Trinitapoli		
2021–2022	Valenzana Mado		
2022–2023	Zlatibor Čajetina	22	(0)
2023–2024	FAP		
2024	Sloga Požega		
2025	AO Miltiadis Pyrgou Trifilias		
2025–	Nea Artaki		
- * Club domestic league appearances and goals as of 14:10, 22 October 2023 (UTC)

Stefan Vukmirović (Serbian Cyrillic: Стефан Вукмировић; born 19 July 1991) is a Serbian professional footballer who plays as an attacking midfielder for Nea Artaki.

== Club career ==
He started his career in Šumadija Kragujevac. He played for Radnički Kragujevac, BASK, Jagodina and Jedinstvo Putevi. On the beginning of 2014, he arrived to Napredak Kruševac. Vukmirović later played for Sloboda Užice and Radnik Surdulica before he joined Borac Čačak in summer 2015. After a season with Borac, Vukmirović signed his second spell with Sloboda Užice in August 2016. At the beginning of 2017, he moved to Malaysia Premier League side Kuantan FA.

== Honours ==
Radnik Surdulica

- Serbian First League: 2014–15
