= Nemanja Živković =

Serbian footballer

Personal information
- Full name: Nemanja Živković
- Date of birth: 24 January 1995 (age 31)
- Place of birth: Belgrade, FR Yugoslavia
- Height: 1.77 m (5 ft 10 in)
- Position: Left back

Team information
- Current team: Podrinje Janja
- Number: 3

Senior career*
Years	Team	Apps	(Gls)
2014–2017	Javor Ivanjica	7	(1)
2014–2015	→ Železničar Lajkovac (loan)	5	(1)
2015–2016	→ Loznica (loan)	13	(1)
2016	→ Sloboda Užice (loan)	0	(0)
2017–2018	Loznica	28	(4)
2018–2019	Drina Ljubovija	15	(1)
2019–	Podrinje Janja	11	(0)
- * Club domestic league appearances and goals as of 18:52, 30 December 2019 (UTC)

Nemanja Živković (Serbian Cyrillic: Немања Живковић; born 24 January 1995) is a Serbian football left back who plays for Bosnian club FK Podrinje Janja.

== Club career ==
Born in Belgrade, Živković started his senior career with Javor Ivanjica. Playing in the Serbian First League, he collected 7 matches and scored 1 goal during the 2014–15 season, and he was also loaned to Serbian League West side Železničar Lajkovac on dual registration during the same season. For the next season, Živković was loaned to Loznica, on dual registration. After a season he spent with Loznica, Živković left on new loan to Sloboda Užice for the first half of 2016–17 Serbian First League season. After the end of a contract with club, Živković left Javor in 2017.

Ahead of the 2019-20 season, Živković joined Bosnian First League of the Republika Srpska club FK Podrinje Janja.

== Career statistics ==
As of 12 December 2016

Club	Season	League			Cup		Continental		Other		Total	
Club	Season	Division	Apps	Goals	Apps	Goals	Apps	Goals	Apps	Goals	Apps	Goals
Javor Ivanjica	2013–14	Serbian SuperLiga	0	0	0	0	—		—		0	0
Javor Ivanjica	2014–15	Serbian First League	7	1	0	0	—		—		7	1
Javor Ivanjica	2015–16	Serbian SuperLiga	0	0	1	0	—		—		1	0
Javor Ivanjica	2016–17	Serbian SuperLiga	0	0	—		—		—		0	0
Javor Ivanjica	Total		7	1	1	0	—		—		8	1
Železničar Lajkovac (loan)	2014–15	Serbian League West	5	1	—		—		—		5	1
Loznica (loan)	2015–16	Serbian First League	13	1	0	0	—		—		13	1
Sloboda Užice (loan)	2016–17	Serbian First League	0	0	0	0	—		—		0	0
Career total			25	3	1	0	—		—		26	3
