= Samuel Nnamani =

Nigerian footballer

Personal information
- Full name: Samuel Onyedikachuwu Nnamani
- Date of birth: 3 June 1995 (age 31)
- Place of birth: Lagos, Nigeria
- Height: 1.83 m (6 ft 0 in)
- Position: Forward

Team information
- Current team: Assyiska FF
- Number: 17

Youth career
- 2013–2014: Christ Ambassador FC

Senior career*
Years	Team	Apps	(Gls)
2014	Sloga Petrovac na Mlavi	0	(0)
2015	Jagodina	1	(0)
2015–2016	Donji Srem	19	(0)
2016–2017	Sloboda Užice	24	(5)
2018–2020	AFC Eskilstuna	83	(32)
2021	Jeonnam Dragons	31	(4)
2022	Bucheon FC 1995	27	(3)
2023	Thep Xanh Nam Dinh	8	(2)
2023	Nakhon Pathom United	3	(1)
2025–2026	Nordic United	28	(11)
2026-	Assyriska FF	22	(3)
- * Club domestic league appearances and goals as of 16 November 2026

Samuel Onyedikachukwu Nnamani (born 3 June 1995) is a Nigerian professional footballer who plays as forward for Swedish club Assyriska FF.

== Career ==
Nnamani arrived in Serbia in 2014, and joined Sloga Petrovac na Mlavi, but he didn't get a chance in official match. In winter break off-season 2014–15, he signed with Jagodina. He made his professional debut for Jagodina in Serbian SuperLiga on 7 March 2015 against Radnički Niš.
