= Rade Glišović =

Serbian footballer

Personal information
- Full name: Rade Glišović
- Date of birth: 9 February 1995 (age 31)
- Place of birth: Užice, FR Yugoslavia
- Height: 1.87 m (6 ft 2 in)
- Position: Centre-back

Team information
- Current team: Sloboda Užice
- Number: 15

Youth career
- 2009–2014: Jedinstvo Užice

Senior career*
Years	Team	Apps	(Gls)
2013–2016	Jedinstvo Užice	47	(1)
2016	Rudar Pljevlja	0	(0)
2017–2018	Sloboda Užice	40	(1)
2018–2020	Zlatibor Čajetina	59	(2)
2021	Borac Čačak	16	(0)
2021	Zlatibor Čajetina	1	(0)
2021–	Sloboda Užice	105	(8)
- * Club domestic league appearances and goals as of 25 June 2025

Rade Glišović (Serbian Cyrillic: Раде Глишовић; born 9 February 1995) is a Serbian footballer who plays as a defender for Sloboda Užice.

== Club career ==
Born in Užice, Glišović started his career with local club Jedinstvo Užice. He made his senior debut for the club in the 33rd fixture match of the 2012–13 season against Voždovac, and later made 20 more appearances for next two Serbian First League seasons and also played Serbian Cup match against Rad. At the beginning of 2015–16 season, Glišović played cup matches against Zemun and Čajetina, and later also spent the whole season as a standard defender. After he terminated the contract with club, Glišović joined Rudar Pljevlja in summer 2016, where noted one appearance in Montenegrin Cup, against Bokelj. At the beginning of 2017, Glišović returned to his home town and joined Sloboda Užice.

== Career statistics ==
As of 16 March 2018

Appearances and goals by club, season and competition
Club	Season	League			Cup		Continental		Other		Total	
Club	Season	Division	Apps	Goals	Apps	Goals	Apps	Goals	Apps	Goals	Apps	Goals
Jedinstvo Užice	2012–13	Serbian First League	1	0	0	0	—		—		1	0
Jedinstvo Užice	2013–14	Serbian First League	3	0	0	0	—		—		3	0
Jedinstvo Užice	2014–15	Serbian First League	17	0	1	0	—		—		18	0
Jedinstvo Užice	2015–16	Serbian League West	26	1	1	0	—		1 (Note: Appearance in OFS Užice cup)	0	28	1
Jedinstvo Užice	Total		47	1	2	0	—		1	0	50	1
Rudar Pljevlja	2016–17	Montenegrin First League	0	0	1	0	—		—		1	0
Sloboda Užice	2016–17	Serbian First League	10	0	0	0	—		—		10	0
Sloboda Užice	2017–18	Serbian First League	30	1	1	0	—		—		31	1
Sloboda Užice	Total		40	1	1	0	—		—		41	1
Career total			87	2	4	0	—		1	0	92	2
