= Milan Čančarević =

Serbian football manager and player

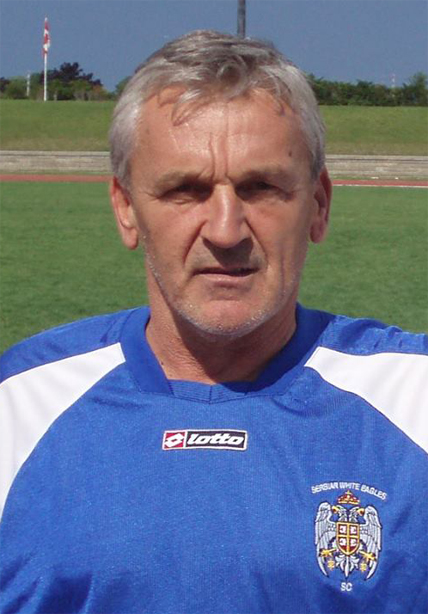
- Čančarević in 2008

Personal information
- Date of birth: 21 May 1955 (age 71)
- Place of birth: Užička Požega, PR Serbia, FPR Yugoslavia
- Position: Midfielder

Youth career
- Sloga Užička Požega

Senior career*
Years	Team	Apps	(Gls)
1980–1986	Sloboda Titovo Užice	92	(5)

Managerial career
- 1999–2000: Sloboda Užice
- 2000–2001: Sloga Kraljevo
- 2003–2004: Sloboda Užice
- 2008: Serbian White Eagles
- 2011–2012: Loznica
- 2013–2016: Zlatibor Čajetina
- 2018: Polimlje
- 2019–2022: Drina Ljubovija
- * Club domestic league appearances and goals

Milan Čančarević (Serbian Cyrillic: Милан Чанчаревић; born 21 May 1955) is a Serbian football manager and former player.

== Playing career ==
After starting out at his hometown club Sloga Užička Požega, Čančarević spent most of his playing career with Sloboda Titovo Užice, making 97 appearances and scoring five goals in the Yugoslav Second League between 1980 and 1986.

== Managerial career ==
In July 1999, Čančarević became manager of Sloboda Užice, competing in the Second League of FR Yugoslavia. He was dismissed from his position in August 2000.

In 2008, Čančarević was hired as head coach for the Serbian White Eagles of the Canadian Soccer League. He won the CSL Championship after defeating the Trois-Rivières Attak on penalties.

In 2013, Čančarević was appointed as manager of Zlatibor Čajetina. He spent three seasons in charge and led the club to promotion from the Zlatibor District League to the Serbian League West.

Between 2019 and 2022, Čančarević was manager of Kolubara-Mačva Zone League club Drina Ljubovija.

== Personal life ==
Čančarević is the father of fellow footballer Ognjen Čančarević.

== Honours ==
Serbian White Eagles

- Canadian Soccer League: 2008

Zlatibor Čajetina

- Drina Zone League: 2015–16
- Zlatibor District League: 2013–14
