= Duško Stajić =

Bosnian footballer

Personal information
- Date of birth: 11 July 1982 (age 44)
- Place of birth: Sarajevo, SFR Yugoslavia
- Height: 1.83 m (6 ft 0 in)
- Position: Striker

Senior career*
| Years | Team | Apps | (Gls) |
| 1999–2000 | Rudar Ugljevik | | |
| 2000–2002 | Proleter Zrenjanin | | |
| 2002–2003 | Rudar Ugljevik | 20 | ( 10) |
| 2004 | FC Slovácko | 10 | (2) |
| 2005–2006 | Publikum Celje | 36 | (7) |
| 2006 | Ceahlăul Piatra Neamţ | 12 | (1) |
| 2007 | Radnik Bijeljina | 6 | (1) |
| 2007–2008 | FK Sarajevo | 12 | (0) |
| 2008–2010 | Modriča | 36 | (13) |
| 2010 | → Rot Weiss Ahlen (loan) | 7 | (0) |
| 2010–2012 | Borac Banja Luka | 55 | (10) |
| 2012 | Sloboda Užice | 12 | (1) |
| 2013 | Čelik Zenica | 27 | (2) |
| 2014 | Iraklis Psachna | 5 | (1) |
| 2014 | Mladost Velika Obarska | 11 | (0) |
| 2015–2018 | Jedinstvo Brodac | 13 | (9) |

International career^{‡}
| 2002–2003 | Bosnia and Hrezegovina U21 | 8 | (2) |
- * Club domestic league appearances and goals as of 13 June 2015 ‡ National team caps and goals as of 13 June 2015

Duško Stajić (Serbian Cyrillic: Душко Cтajић, born 11 July 1982) is a Bosnian retired professional footballer.

== Club career ==
Stajić started his career with FK Rudar Ugljevik moving on to FK Proleter Zrenjanin in the Second League of FR Yugoslavia early in his career, and later played with Publikum Celje in the Slovenian PrvaLiga during the second half of 2004–05 and entire 2005–06 seasons. He played for FK Sarajevo in the Bosnian Premier League during the 2007–08 season. In December 2009, he was linked with a move to SPL sides St Mirren, Falkirk and Hamilton. In February 2010, Stajić left FK Modriča, signing for Rot Weiss Ahlen. On 28 April 2010, Rot-Weiss Ahlen announced they would not sign Stajić permanently following his loan, and that he would return to FK Modriča. In summer 2010, since his club was relegated, he moved to FK Borac Banja Luka in the Premier League of Bosnia and Herzegovina. After a short spell in FK Sloboda Užice, he signed for NK Čelik Zenica. At the second half of the 2013–14 season he had a spell in Greek second-tier side Iraklis Psachna, but in summer 2014 he was back in Bosnia this time to join newly promoted FK Mladost Velika Obarska. However, in the following winter break he left Mladost and joined FK Jedinstvo Brodac playing in the Second League of the Republika Srpska where his goalscoring skills will return by making 9 goals in 13 appearances.

In January 2019 he was snapped up by lower league side Mladost Popovo Polje. He joined Slobodan Starčević' coaching staff at Radnik Bijeljina in November 2019.

== International career ==
He was part of the Bosnia and Herzegovina national under-21 football team.
