= Emeka Emerun =

Nigerian football player (born 1994)

Personal information
- Full name: Emeka Emerun Christ
- Date of birth: 11 November 1994 (age 32)
- Place of birth: Owerri, Nigeria
- Height: 1.77 m (5 ft 10 in)
- Position: Forward

Youth career
- 2010–2011: Bayern Munich

Senior career*
Years	Team	Apps	(Gls)
2011	Bayern Munich II		
2012–2014	CA Bizertin	1	(0)
2013	→ Espérance Tunis (loan)		
2014	→ Olympique Béja (loan)	4	(0)
2015–2017	Sloboda Užice	43	(6)
2017	Radnički Pirot	10	(5)
2018–2021	Budućnost Dobanovci	61	(3)
- * Club domestic league appearances and goals as of 3 October 2021

Emeka Emerun // (born 11 November 1994) is a Nigerian professional footballer who plays as a forward.

== Career ==
Born in Owerri, he begin playing football inspired by his mother, who was a football player. He started playing in a local football academy. When he was 16 he went to Denmark and played one tournament where he scored five goals in six games and thus earned attention from German club Bayern Munich who brought him to their youth team. He played with Bayern Munich Junior Team in the 2011–12 Under 19 Bundesliga. He started his senior career playing with Bayern Munich II in the 2011–12 season. During the winter-break he moved to Tunisia and signed with CA Bizertin. He played on loan at Espérance Sportive de Tunis in 2013. He left Tunisia by the end of 2014 after having played in the Tunisian Ligue Professionnelle 1 with Bizertin and Olympique Béja. He returned to Europe and signed with Serbian side Sloboda Užice in summer 2015.

== Personal life ==
His mother, Teresa Emerun, was a professional footballer. He has four brothers and four sisters, and the four brothers all play football as well.
