= Slobodan Dogandžić =

Serbian football manager and player

Personal information
- Date of birth: 16 September 1944 (age 82)
- Place of birth: Užice, FS Serbia, DF Yugoslavia
- Position: Defender

Youth career
- Železničar Titovo Užice
- 1958–1962: Sloboda Titovo Užice

Senior career*
Years	Team	Apps	(Gls)
1962–1970	Sloboda Titovo Užice	134	(5)
1970–1972	Čelik Zenica	49	(0)
1972–1978	Olimpija Ljubljana	199	(3)
1978–1981	San Diego Sockers	38	(2)
1980–1981	San Diego Sockers (indoor)	15	(5)
Total		435	(15)

Managerial career
- Sloboda Titovo Užice
- 1988–1989: Liria Prizren
- 1989–1990: Leotar
- 1991: Olimpija Ljubljana
- 1992–1993: Bečej
- 1994: Napredak Kruševac
- 1994–1995: Sloboda Užice
- 1997: Sloboda Užice
- 1998: Borac Čačak
- 1998–2000: Železnik
- 2000: Sartid Smederevo
- 2000–2001: Siirtspor
- 2001: Mladost Apatin
- 2007: Sloboda Užice
- 2008: Lovćen
- 2009: Radnički Niš
- 2009: Šumadija Radnički 1923
- 2013: Sopot
- 2019: Sloboda Užice
- * Club domestic league appearances and goals

Slobodan Dogandžić (Serbian Cyrillic: Слободан Доганџић; born 16 September 1944) is a Serbian former football manager and player.

== Playing career ==
Born in Užice, Dogandžić made his senior debut with his hometown club Sloboda, helping them earn promotion to the Yugoslav Second League in 1965. He was a regular member of the team over the next five seasons, making over 100 appearances in the second tier of Yugoslav football. During this period, Dogandžić was teammates with several future international players and managers, namely Radomir Antić, Milovan Đorić, Petar Krivokuća, Miroslav Pavlović, Miroslav Vukašinović, and Milan Živadinović, among others.

In 1970, Dogandžić was transferred to Čelik Zenica. He switched to Olimpija Ljubljana in 1972. Over the next seven seasons, Dogandžić amassed nearly 200 appearances for the Zmaji in the Yugoslav First League.

In 1978, Dogandžić moved to the United States and joined the San Diego Sockers of the North American Soccer League. He retired from professional football in 1981.

== Managerial career ==
After hanging up his boots, Dogandžić was manager of numerous clubs, including Olimpija Ljubljana and Napredak Kruševac. He also served as manager of Siirtspor (Turkey).

== Career statistics ==
Appearances and goals by club, season and competition
Club	Season	League		
Club	Season	Division	Apps	Goals
Sloboda Titovo Užice	1964–65	Serbian League South	4	0
Sloboda Titovo Užice	1965–66	Yugoslav Second League	12	0
Sloboda Titovo Užice	1966–67	Yugoslav Second League	31	0
Sloboda Titovo Užice	1967–68	Yugoslav Second League	31	1
Sloboda Titovo Užice	1968–69	Yugoslav Second League	28	2
Sloboda Titovo Užice	1969–70	Yugoslav Second League	28	2
Sloboda Titovo Užice	Total		134	5
Čelik Zenica	1970–71	Yugoslav First League	33	0
Čelik Zenica	1971–72	Yugoslav First League	16	0
Čelik Zenica	Total		49	0
Olimpija Ljubljana	1972–73	Yugoslav First League	32	0
Olimpija Ljubljana	1973–74	Yugoslav First League	29	0
Olimpija Ljubljana	1974–75	Yugoslav First League	33	1
Olimpija Ljubljana	1975–76	Yugoslav First League	31	2
Olimpija Ljubljana	1976–77	Yugoslav First League	34	0
Olimpija Ljubljana	1977–78	Yugoslav First League	29	0
Olimpija Ljubljana	1978–79	Yugoslav First League	11	0
Olimpija Ljubljana	Total		199	3
San Diego Sockers	1978	North American Soccer League	9	1
San Diego Sockers	1979	North American Soccer League	25	1
San Diego Sockers	1981	North American Soccer League	4	0
San Diego Sockers	Total		38	2
San Diego Sockers (indoor)	1980–81	North American Soccer League	15	5
Career total			435	15
