= Filip Arsenijević =

Serbian footballer

Personal information
- Full name: Filip Arsenijević
- Date of birth: 2 September 1983 (age 43)
- Place of birth: Titovo Užice, SFR Yugoslavia
- Height: 1.73 m (5 ft 8 in)
- Position: Midfielder

Senior career*
Years	Team	Apps	(Gls)
2001–2004	Sloboda Užice	43	(4)
2004–2007	OFK Beograd	3	(0)
2004–2005	→ Mačva Šabac (loan)	6	(0)
2005–2007	→ Sevojno (loan)	77	(10)
2007–2009	Javor Ivanjica	42	(4)
2009–2011	Panthrakikos	35	(6)
2011	Jagodina	12	(0)
2012	Shakhter Karagandy	19	(1)
2013–2015	Jagodina	48	(4)
2015	Novi Pazar	11	(0)
2015–2016	Trikala	8	(1)
2016–2017	Sparta	0	(0)
2017	AEEK SYNKA		
2017–2018	Mačva Šabac	22	(1)
2018–2020	TSC	47	(5)

Managerial career
- 2021: Sloboda Užice (assistant)
- 2022–2025: Sloboda Užice (assistant)
- 2024: Sloboda Užice (caretaker)
- 2025: Sloboda Užice
- 2026–: FAP (assistant)
- * Club domestic league appearances and goals as of 31 January 2021

Filip Arsenijević (Serbian Cyrillic: Филип Арсенијевић; born 2 September 1983) is a Serbian former footballer and current coach. He is the older brother of Nemanja Arsenijević.

== Club career ==
Born in Titovo Užice, SR Serbia, SFR Yugoslavia, between 2001 and 2009 he played in Serbian clubs FK Sloboda Užice, OFK Beograd, FK Mačva Šabac, FK Sevojno and FK Javor Ivanjica. Between 2009 and 2011 he has been in Greece playing with Panthrakikos in the Super League Greece.

On 30 August 2011 he returned to Serbia and signed a one-year deal with top league club FK Jagodina. Later, he spent the 2012 season playing with the Kazakhstan Premier League team FC Shakhter Karagandy and winning the national title, before returning to Jagodina by early 2013 in time to help the team with the Serbian Cup.

== Honours ==
Javor Ivanjica

- Serbian First League: 2007–08

Shakhter Karagandy

- Kazakhstan Premier League: 2012

Jagodina

- Serbian Cup: 2013
