= Momčilo Rudan =

Serbian footballer

Personal information
- Date of birth: 9 January 1990 (age 36)
- Place of birth: Belgrade, SR Serbia, SFR Yugoslavia
- Height: 1.89 m (6 ft 2 1/2 in)
- Position: Defender

Senior career*
Years	Team	Apps	(Gls)
2008–2009	Šumadija Jagnjilo	10	(0)
2009-2010	Palilulac Beograd	1	(0)
2010	→ Sloboda Užice (loan)	1	(0)
2010	→ Žarkovo (loan)		
2011	OFK Bačka		
2011	→ Voždovac (loan)	0	(0)
2011	Jedinstvo Ub	9	(0)
2012	Sopot	0	(0)
2012	Palilulac Beograd		
2013	Senta	4	(0)
2013–2014	Đerdap	26	(2)
2014–2016	Sileks	18	(2)
2016–2017	Sloboda Užice	1	(0)
2017–2018	Bratstvo Prigrevica	3	(0)
2018–2020	Scarborough		
- * Club domestic league appearances and goals as of 17 December 2018

Momčilo Rudan (born January 9, 1990) is a Serbian footballer who plays as a defender.

== Playing career ==
Rudan began playing in 2008 in the Serbian League Belgrade with FK Šumadija Jagnjilo, and with FK Palilulac Beograd in 2009. He had a loan spell with FK Sloboda Užice in 2009, and had stints with OFK Bačka, FK Voždovac, FK Jedinstvo Ub, and FK Sopot. He later played in the Serbian Zone League, and Serbian League Vojvodina with FK Senta, and FK Đerdap. In 2014, he played abroad in the Macedonian First Football League with FK Sileks. After two seasons abroad he played in the Serbian First League with former club FK Sloboda Užice.

In 2017, he returned to the Serbian League Vojvodina with FK Bratstvo Prigrevica. In 2018, he made his second stint abroad in the Canadian Soccer League with Scarborough SC. In his debut season he assisted Scarborough in reaching the CSL Championship final, but were defeated by FC Vorkuta in a penalty shootout.
