= Uroš Đerić =

Serbian footballer

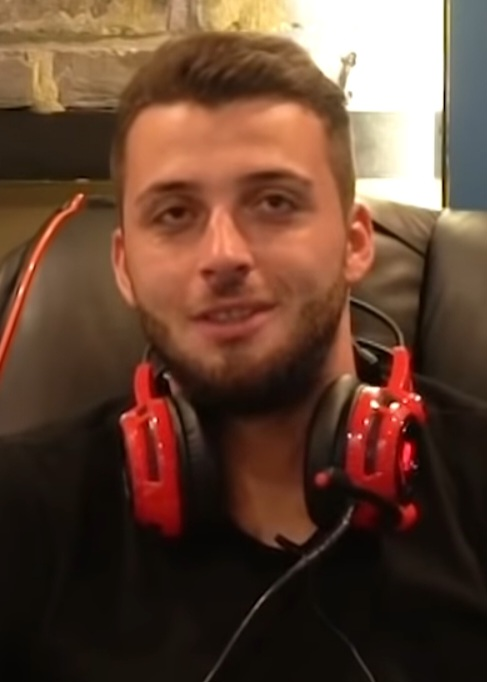

Personal information
- Full name: Uroš Đerić
- Date of birth: 28 May 1992 (age 34)
- Place of birth: Trebinje, Bosnia and Herzegovina
- Height: 1.96 m (6 ft 5 in)
- Position: Striker

Team information
- Current team: Jedinstvo Stara Pazova

Senior career*
| Years | Team | Apps | (Gls) |
| 2009–2010 | Radnički Nova Pazova | 40 | (17) |
| 2011 | Amiens | 2 | (0) |
| 2012 | Inter Zaprešić | 1 | (0) |
| 2013 | VPS | 0 | (0) |
| 2013 | Radnički Niš | 3 | (0) |
| 2014–2015 | Borac Čačak | 51 | (2) |
| 2016 | Mladost Lučani | 3 | (0) |
| 2016–2017 | Sloboda Užice | 28 | (19) |
| 2017 | Napredak Kruševac | 16 | (8) |
| 2018–2019 | Gangwon FC | 50 | (28) |
| 2019–2020 | Gyeongnam FC | 23 | (10) |
| 2021 | Suwon Samsung Bluewings | 27 | (6) |
| 2023 | Guangxi Pingguo Haliao | 3 | (0) |
| 2023 | Sloboda Uzice | 13 | (0) |
| 2025– | Jedinstvo Stara Pazova | | |
- * Club domestic league appearances and goals as of 26 December 2025

Uroš Đerić (Serbian Cyrillic: Урош Ђерић; born 28 May 1992) is a Serbian professional footballer who plays as a striker for Jedinstvo Stara Pazova.

== Club career ==
Born in Trebinje, Đerić made his senior debut with Radnički Nova Pazova during the 2008–09 Serbian League Vojvodina. He was transferred to French side Amiens in the 2011 winter transfer window. Afterwards, Đerić shortly played in Croatia (Inter Zaprešić) and Finland (VPS), before returning to Serbia.

In August 2013, Đerić signed with Serbian SuperLiga club Radnički Niš. He left them after just six months and joined Serbian First League side Borac Čačak, helping them win promotion to the top flight. During his time at the club, Đerić scored just three times in official matches, once each season. He subsequently moved to fellow SuperLiga side Mladost Lučani in the 2016 winter transfer window.

In July 2016, Đerić was acquired by Sloboda Užice. He became the Serbian First League top scorer with 19 goals in the 2016–17 season. In June 2017, Đerić earned a transfer to Serbian SuperLiga club Napredak Kruševac. He scored eight goals in 18 appearances during the first half of the 2017–18 Serbian SuperLiga.

In January 2018, Đerić officially moved to South Korea and joined K League 1 club Gangwon. He was the league's second-highest scorer in the 2018 season with 24 goals, two less than Brazilian striker Marcão. In July 2019, Đerić joined K League 1 rivals Gyeongnam. He scored in the second minute of his debut in an eventual 2–2 draw with Jeju United.

On 17 April 2023, Đerić joined China League One side Guangxi Pingguo Haliao.

== Career statistics ==
As of match played 18 November 2023

Appearances and goals by club, season and competition
| Club | Season | League | | | Cup | | Continental | | Other | | Total | |
| Club | Season | Division | Apps | Goals | Apps | Goals | Apps | Goals | Apps | Goals | Apps | Goals |
|---|---|---|---|---|---|---|---|---|---|---|---|---|
| Radnički Niš | 2013–14 | Serbian SuperLiga | 3 | 0 | 0 | 0 | — | | — | | 3 | 0 |
| Borac Čačak | 2013–14 | Serbian First League | 9 | 1 | 0 | 0 | — | | — | | 9 | 1 |
| Borac Čačak | 2014–15 | Serbian SuperLiga | 24 | 1 | 1 | 0 | — | | — | | 25 | 1 |
| Borac Čačak | 2015–16 | Serbian SuperLiga | 18 | 0 | 2 | 1 | — | | — | | 20 | 1 |
| Borac Čačak | Total | | 51 | 2 | 3 | 1 | — | | — | | 54 | 3 |
| Mladost Lučani | 2015–16 | Serbian SuperLiga | 3 | 0 | 0 | 0 | — | | — | | 3 | 0 |
| Sloboda Užice | 2016–17 | Serbian First League | 28 | 19 | 2 | 2 | — | | — | | 30 | 21 |
| Napredak Kruševac | 2017–18 | Serbian SuperLiga | 16 | 8 | 2 | 2 | — | | — | | 18 | 10 |
| Gangwon FC | 2018 | K League 1 | 36 | 24 | 1 | 0 | — | | — | | 37 | 24 |
| Gangwon FC | 2019 | K League 1 | 14 | 4 | 1 | 2 | — | | — | | 15 | 6 |
| Gangwon FC | Total | | 50 | 28 | 2 | 2 | — | | — | | 52 | 30 |
| Gyeongnam FC | 2019 | K League 1 | 17 | 9 | 0 | 0 | — | | 2 | 0 | 19 | 9 |
| Gyeongnam FC | 2020 | K League 2 | 6 | 1 | 1 | 0 | — | | 0 | 0 | 7 | 0 |
| Gyeongnam FC | Total | | 23 | 10 | 3 | 0 | — | | 0 | 0 | 26 | 9 |
| Suwon Samsung Bluewings | 2021 | K League 1 | 27 | 6 | 2 | 1 | — | | — | | 29 | 7 |
| Guangxi Pingguo Haliao | 2023 | China League One | 3 | 0 | 0 | 0 | — | | — | | 3 | 0 |
| Borac Čačak | 2023–24 | Serbian First League | 13 | 0 | 0 | 0 | — | | — | | 13 | 0 |
| Career total | | | 217 | 73 | 14 | 8 | 0 | 0 | 2 | 0 | 233 | 81 |
