= Ajdin Maksumić =

Bosnian-Herzegovinian retired footballer (born 1985)

Personal information
- Date of birth: 24 July 1985 (age 41)
- Place of birth: Konjic, SFR Yugoslavia
- Height: 1.88 m (6 ft 2 in)
- Position: Midfielder

Youth career
- Igman Konjic

Senior career*
Years	Team	Apps	(Gls)
2004–2006	Sarajevo	52	(6)
2007	Khimki	9	(0)
2008–2010	Sarajevo	36	(2)
2010	Dinamo II București	1	(0)
2010–2011	Pandurii	2	(0)
2011	Sarajevo	7	(0)
2012	FC Staad		
2012	Sloboda Užice	0	(0)
2013	GOŠK Gabela	6	(0)
2013–2014	Zvijezda Gradačac	22	(0)
2014–2015	Igman Konjic	12	(1)
2015	Vatanspor BH	5	(0)
2016-2018	FV Bad Vilbel	85	(18)
Total		237	(27)

International career^{‡}
2003	Bosnia and Herzegovina U-19	2	(0)
2006–2007	Bosnia and Herzegovina U-21	3	(0)
- * Club domestic league appearances and goals as of 19 May 2024 ‡ National team caps and goals as of 19 May 2024

Ajdin Maksumić (born 24 July 1985) is a Bosnian-Herzegovinian retired footballer who ended his career in the German amateur leagues.

== Club career ==
Born in Konjic, SR Bosnia and Herzegovina, previously, he played for FK Igman from his hometown and FK Sarajevo.

On January 30, 2007, he transferred to Russian club FC Khimki, where he played in 9 Russian Premier League matches.

On August 28, 2008, he came back to FK Sarajevo and played in the Premier League of Bosnia and Herzegovina. During the winter break of the 2011–12 season he left Bosnia and joined Swiss lower league side FC Staad. In August 2012 after a successful trial he signed with Serbian club FK Sloboda Užice.

In summer 2014, he returned to his hometown club, FK Igman Konjic.

== International career ==
In March 2007, he received his first senior call up from against Norway, but did not play.

Earlier he was a member of the Bosnian U21 team.
