= Aleksandar Petrović (footballer, born 8 February 1985) =

Serbian footballer

Personal information
- Full name: Aleksandar Milorad Petrović
- Date of birth: 8 February 1985 (age 41)
- Place of birth: Belgrade, SFR Yugoslavia
- Height: 1.90 m (6 ft 3 in)
- Position: Defender

Senior career*
Years	Team	Apps	(Gls)
2004–2006	BASK	55	(0)
2006–2008	Mladost Lučani	41	(2)
2008–2010	Rad	28	(1)
2011	Sloboda Point Sevojno	1	(0)
2011–2012	Novi Pazar	5	(0)
2012	Radnički Niš	13	(0)
2012	Nasaf Qarshi	7	(1)
2013–2014	Jedinstvo Užice	22	(0)
2015–2016	Mornar	10	(0)
2016	Sloboda Užice	6	(0)
Total		188	(4)

Managerial career
- 2021: Sinđelić Beograd
- * Club domestic league appearances and goals

Aleksandar Milorad Petrović (Serbian Cyrillic: Александар Петровић; born 8 February 1985) is a Serbian former footballer.

== Career ==
Born in Belgrade, Petrović began his career in his native country, Serbia when he played for FK BASK.

He played three seasons with BASK. During the 2006/07 season, he moved to FK Mladost Lučani and later on played two seasons with Mladost Lučani. He later on moved to FK Rad in the Serbian SuperLiga. During the 2010/11 season, he moved to FK Sloboda Point Sevojno. For the 2011 season, he played with Serbian club, FK Novi Pazar in the Serbian SuperLiga. Early in 2012 Petrović joined FK Radnički Niš in Serbian First League. After a year at Radnički Niš, he moved to the champions of the 2011 AFC Cup, FC Nasaf.
