= Saša Kiš =

Serbian footballer

Personal information
- Full name: Saša Kiš
- Date of birth: 7 April 1989 (age 37)
- Place of birth: Vrbas, SFR Yugoslavia
- Height: 1.79 m (5 ft 10 in)
- Position: Winger

Senior career*
Years	Team	Apps	(Gls)
2007–2009	Hajduk Kula	3	(0)
2009	Mladost Apatin	14	(2)
2009–2013	Hajduk Kula	60	(3)
2013	Voždovac	2	(0)
2014	Inđija	5	(0)
2014-2020	Bačka 1901		
2020-2021	Tisa Adorjan		
2021-	Bačka 1901		
- * Club domestic league appearances and goals as of 23 July 2014

Saša Kiš (Serbian Cyrillic: Саша Киш; born 7 April 1989) is a Serbian football midfielder.
