= Miloš Ristanović =

Serbian footballer

Miloš Ristanović Милош Ристановић
Personal information
- Full name: Miloš Ristanović
- Date of birth: November 14, 1982 (age 43)
- Place of birth: Čačak, SFR Yugoslavia
- Height: 1.79 m (5 ft 10 in)
- Position: Right back

Senior career*
Years	Team	Apps	(Gls)
2001–2003	Remont Čačak	36	(3)
2003	Metalac Gornji Milanovac	18	(0)
2004–2005	Bnei Yehuda	3	(0)
2005–2006	Mladost Lučani	25	(4)
2006-2007	Sevojno	27	(3)
2008	Jagodina	24	(1)
2009–2010	Kolubara	47	(1)
2010–2011	Sloboda Čačak		
2011–2013	Polet Ljubić		
2012	KMF Fontana Čačak		
- * Club domestic league appearances and goals as of August 1, 2010

Miloš Ristanović (Serbian Cyrillic: Милош Ристановић; born November 14, 1982) is a Serbian professional footballer.
