= Slavko Marić =

Serbian footballer

Personal information
- Full name: Slavko Marić
- Date of birth: 7 March 1984 (age 42)
- Place of birth: Goražde, SFR Yugoslavia
- Height: 1.83 m (6 ft 0 in)
- Position: Left back

Youth career
- Hajduk Beograd

Senior career*
Years	Team	Apps	(Gls)
2001–2006	Hajduk Beograd	83	(10)
2006–2008	Mladost Lučani	53	(2)
2008–2011	Borac Čačak	67	(0)
2011–2012	Sloboda Užice	39	(1)
2013–2014	Radnički Kragujevac	39	(2)
2014	Lamia	0	(0)
2015	Dila Gori	9	(0)
2015–2016	Jagodina	23	(0)
2016–2017	Novi Pazar	33	(0)
2017–2018	Mladost Lučani	14	(0)
2018–2020	Mačva Šabac	34	(0)
Total		394	(15)
- * Club domestic league appearances and goals as of 20:31, 2 April 2021 (UTC)

Slavko Marić (Serbian Cyrillic: Славко Марић; born 7 March 1984) is a Serbian retired footballer who played as a defender. He is one of the most capped Serbian SuperLiga players with over 250 appearances.

== Honours ==
Hajduk Beograd

- Second League of Serbia and Montenegro: 2003–04

Mladost Lučani

- Serbian First League: 2006–07
- Serbian Cup: Runner-up 2017–18
