= Nikola Nešović =

Serbian footballer

Personal information
- Full name: Nikola Nešović
- Date of birth: 17 October 1993 (age 33)
- Place of birth: Čačak, FR Yugoslavia
- Height: 1.75 m (5 ft 9 in)
- Position: Second striker

Team information
- Current team: Gorušica Viča

Senior career*
Years	Team	Apps	(Gls)
2011–2015	Borac Čačak	9	(0)
2011	→ Prijevor (loan)		
2012	→ Partizan BB (loan)	14	(4)
2012	→ Polet Ljubić (loan)	12	(3)
2013	→ Mladi Radnik (loan)	13	(4)
2014–2015	→ Polet Ljubić (loan)	18	(11)
2015–2016	Napredak Kruševac	18	(0)
2016–2017	Sloboda Užice	39	(10)
2018–2020	Zemun	26	(3)
2020	Žarkovo	7	(1)
2020–2021	Sloboda Užice		
2021-2022	FK Smederevo 1924		
2023	Žarkovo		
2023	Donji Srem		
2024-	Gorušica Viča		
- * Club domestic league appearances and goals as of 28 May 2018

Nikola Nešović (Serbian Cyrillic: Никола Нешовић; born 17 October 1993) is a Serbian footballer, who plays as a forward for Gorušica Viča.

== Honours ==
Kruševac has one medal as Serbian Second League Champion in the 2015-2016 season playing with K Napredak Krusevac.
