= Predrag Ranđelović (footballer, born 1976) =

Serbian footballer

Personal information
- Full name: Predrag Ranđelović
- Date of birth: 13 September 1976 (age 50)
- Place of birth: Niš, SFR Yugoslavia
- Height: 1.86 m (6 ft 1 in)
- Position: Striker

Senior career*
Years	Team	Apps	(Gls)
1997–1998	Radnički Niš	15	(2)
1998–1999	Zvezdara		
1999–2001	Anzhi Makhachkala	56	(14)
2001	CSKA Moscow	13	(8)
2002–2003	Zenit Saint Petersburg	12	(1)
2004	Universitatea Craiova	2	(0)
2004–2005	Niki Volos	15	(2)
2006	Obilić	10	(3)
2006–2007	Admira Wacker Mödling	21	(4)
2007–2008	Bežanija	25	(12)
2008–2010	Rudar Pljevlja	75	(40)
2011	Mogren	27	(7)
2012–2013	Sloboda Užice	42	(23)
2013–2014	Kolubara	8	(2)
Total		321	(118)

Managerial career
- 2014–2015: Krasnodar (youth)
- 2015–2016: Rudar Pljevlja (assistant)
- 2016: Rudar Pljevlja (caretaker)
- * Club domestic league appearances and goals

Predrag Ranđelović (Serbian Cyrillic: Предраг Ранђеловић; born 13 September 1976) is a Serbian former professional footballer who played as a striker.

== Playing career ==
After playing in his homeland, Ranđelović moved to Russia and signed with Anzhi Makhachkala in 1999. He was the top scorer of the Dagestan-based club with 12 league goals in the 2000 season. After two years there, Ranđelović went on to play for CSKA Moscow and Zenit Saint Petersburg.

In the summer of 2008, Ranđelović joined Montenegrin club Rudar Pljevlja. He stayed there for the next two and a half years, scoring 40 goals in the First League. In the 2011 winter transfer window, Ranđelović moved to Mogren, helping them win the national championship that season.

In the 2012 winter transfer window, Ranđelović returned to his country and joined SuperLiga club Sloboda Užice. He was the league's second-highest scorer with 18 goals in the 2012–13 season. In the summer of 2013, Ranđelović moved to Kolubara, but retired from the game shortly after.

== Post-playing career ==
In March 2016, Ranđelović briefly served as caretaker manager of Rudar Pljevlja, together with Vuko Bogavac.

== Statistics ==
Club	Season	League	
Club	Season	Apps	Goals
Radnički Niš	1997–98	15	2
Zvezdara	1998–99		
Anzhi Makhachkala	1999	16	1
Anzhi Makhachkala	2000	30	12
Anzhi Makhachkala	2001	10	1
CSKA Moscow	2001	13	8
Zenit Saint Petersburg	2002	9	1
Zenit Saint Petersburg	2003	3	0
Universitatea Craiova	2003–04	2	0
Niki Volos	2004–05	15	2
Obilić	2005–06	10	3
Admira Wacker Mödling	2006–07	21	4
Bežanija	2007–08	25	12
Rudar Pljevlja	2008–09	28	17
Rudar Pljevlja	2009–10	31	19
Rudar Pljevlja	2010–11	16	4
Mogren	2010–11	15	3
Mogren	2011–12	12	4
Sloboda Užice	2011–12	14	5
Sloboda Užice	2012–13	28	18
Kolubara	2013–14	8	2
Career total		321	118

== Honours ==
Anzhi Makhachkala

- Russian First Division: 1999

Rudar Pljevlja

- Montenegrin First League: 2009–10
- Montenegrin Cup: 2009–10

Mogren

- Montenegrin First League: 2010–11
