= Predrag Ristanović =

Serbian football manager and player

Personal information
- Date of birth: 29 September 1972 (age 54)
- Place of birth: Titovo Užice, SR Serbia, SFR Yugoslavia
- Position: Defender

Senior career*
Years	Team	Apps	(Gls)
1990–1991	Sloboda Užice	1	(0)
- Javor Ivanjica
1997–1998	Mladost Lučani	2	(0)
- Sloboda Užice

Managerial career
- 2004: Sloboda Užice (assistant)
- 2004–2007: Sloboda Užice
- 2009–2010: Sloga Požega
- 2011–2013: Jedinstvo Užice
- 2013–2014: Javor Ivanjica
- 2014: Radnički 1923
- 2014: Kolubara
- 2015–2017: Sloboda Užice
- 2018–2020: Zlatibor Čajetina
- 2021: Zlatibor Čajetina
- 2022–2023: Zlatibor Čajetina
- 2023: Sloboda Užice
- 2024: Sloga Požega
- 2025–2026: Polimlje
- 2026–: Zlatibor Čajetina
- * Club domestic league appearances and goals

Predrag Ristanović (Serbian Cyrillic: Предраг Ристановић; born 29 September 1972) is a Serbian football manager and former player.

== Playing career ==
Ristanović made his senior debut for Sloboda Užice in the 1990–91 Yugoslav Second League. He later played for Javor Ivanjica and Mladost Lučani.

== Managerial career ==
Ristanović started his managerial career at Sloboda Užice (December 2004–April 2007). He later served as manager of numerous clubs in his homeland, including Serbian SuperLiga side Javor Ivanjica (November 2013–March 2014).
