= FK Zlatibor Čajetina =

Serbian football club

Zlatibor Čajetina
- Full name: Fudbalski klub Zlatibor Čajetina
- Founded: 1945; 81 years ago
- Ground: Švajcarija Stadium
- Capacity: 3,000
- President: Veljko Radulović
- League: Serbian League West
- 2024–25: Serbian League West, 11th of 16
Home colours	Away colours

FK Zlatibor Čajetina (Serbian Cyrillic: ФК Златибор Чајетина) is a football club based in Čajetina, Serbia. They compete in the Serbian League West, the third tier of the national league system.

== History ==
In the 2013–14 season, the club won the Zlatibor District League with an amazing record, 25 wins and one draw (scoring 128 goals and conceding just six times in the process), thus earning promotion to the Drina Zone League. They spent the next two years in the fourth tier, before finishing first place in the 2015–16 edition, securing them a spot in the Serbian League West. The club won the third-tier championship in the 2017–18 campaign (being tied with Sloga Požega) and got promoted to the Serbian First League for the first time in its history. They also reached the Serbian Cup round of 16 in the same season, losing 1–0 to Čukarički. After spending two seasons in the second tier, the club finished in first place in the COVID-19-shortened 2019–20 season and earned promotion to the Serbian SuperLiga. They placed third from the bottom in their debut appearance in the top tier and suffered relegation back to the Serbian First League.

== Honours ==
- Serbian First League (Tier 2)
  - Champions: 2019–20
- Serbian League West (Tier 3)
  - Champions: 2017–18
- Drina Zone League (Tier 4)
  - Champions: 2015–16
- Zlatibor District League (Tier 5)
  - Champions: 2013–14

== Seasons ==
Season	League									Cup
Season	Division	Pld	W	D	L	GF	GA	Pts	Pos	Cup
Serbia
2010–11	4 – Drina	30	11	6	13	42	39	39	12th	—
2011–12	4 – Drina	30	8	8	14	24	38	32	14th	—
2012–13	5 – Zlatibor	28	16	4	8	65	30	52	4th	—
2013–14	5 – Zlatibor	26	25	1	0	128	6	76	1st	—
2014–15	4 – Drina	28	13	11	4	35	20	50	2nd	—
2015–16	4 – Drina	30	20	8	2	54	21	68	1st	—
2016–17	3 – West	30	10	12	8	30	28	42	5th	—
2017–18	3 – West	34	25	5	4	67	25	80	1st	Round of 16
2018–19	2	37	18	3	16	48	42	32	6th	—
2019–20	2	30 (Note: The season was shortened due to the COVID-19 pandemic in Serbia.)	14	12	4	33	18	54	1st	Round of 32
2020–21	1	38	7	8	23	28	64	29	18th	Round of 32
2021–22	2	37	12	11	14	38	44	47	12th	Round of 32
2022–23	2	37	7	12	18	36	54	33	15th	Round of 32
2023–24	3 – West	30	12	6	12	34	30	42	8th	Preliminary round
2024–25	3 – West	30	9	11	10	31	47	38	11th	-

== Notable players ==
This is a list of players who have played at full international level.

- (Bosnia and Herzegovina) Ifet Đakovac
- (Montenegro) Miloš Krkotić
- (Serbia) Petar Petrović
- (Serbia) Nemanja Stojić

For a list of all FK Zlatibor Čajetina players with a Wikipedia article, see Category:FK Zlatibor Čajetina players.

== Historical list of coaches ==
- (Serbia) Milan Čančarević (2013–2016)
- (Serbia) Vladimir Mudrinić (2016–2017)
- | (Serbia) Predrag Ristanović (2018–2020)
- (Serbia) Zoran Njeguš (2020–2021)
- (Serbia) Ljubomir Ristovski (2021)
- (Serbia) Predrag Ristanović (2021)
- (Serbia) Žarko Jovanović (2021–2022)
- (Serbia) Predrag Ristanović (2022–2023)
- (Serbia) Slaviša Kovačević (2023)
- (North Macedonia) Ivica Cvetanovski (2024)
- (Serbia) Slaviša Božičić (2024)
- (Serbia) Boban Ivanović (2024)
- (Serbia) Izet Ljajić (2025)
- (Serbia) Goran Đukić (2025)
- (Serbia) Tomislav Tmušić (2025)
- (Serbia) Boban Stanković (2026-)
