= FK Sloboda Užice =

Sloboda Užice
- Full name: Gradski fudbalski klub Sloboda Užice
- Founded: 1925; 101 years ago
- Ground: Radomir Antić Stadium
- Capacity: 9,949
- Chairman: Dragan Marjanović
- Head coach: Nemanja Blagojević
- League: Serbian League West
- 2025–26: Serbian League West, 6th of 16
Home colours	Away colours

Gradski fudbalski klub Sloboda Užice (Serbian Cyrillic: Градски фудбалски клуб Слобода Ужице) is a Serbian professional football club based in Užice. They are currently playing in the Serbian League West, the third tier of Serbian football.

== History ==
=== Early years (1920s and 1930s) ===
The club was founded through the initiative of Užice's workers in 1925, as part of the sports society named URSK Sloboda (Užički radnički sportski klub Sloboda, English: Užice's worker's sport klub Sloboda). The founders were communist activists Miloš Marković (who was two years earlier the founder of Radnički Niš) and Josip Šiber. From the very beginning, football had a priority over other sports in the newly founded sports society. The first official match was played on 24 June 1926 against Mladi Radnik from Kragujevac ending in a 2–2 draw. In the 1928–29 season, the club began participating in the regional Western Morava county league, along with other area clubs such as FK Era from Užice, Car Lazar and Obilić from Kruševac, Ibar from Kraljevo, Jedinstvo from Čačak and Takovo from Gornji Milanovac. In 1929, the club officially got accepted under the umbrella of the Yugoslav Football Association as well as the Worker's Sports Union. Due to financial difficulties, the club did not compete in the early 1930s, playing only friendly matches. The club scaled down its football activities in this period, turning its focus towards politics. Due to its ties to worker unions, the club got infiltrated by members and sympathizers of the banned Yugoslav Communist Party (KPJ), becoming in essence the focal point for communist activity in the city of Užice. Authorities reacted by forcing the club to drop the term "radnički" (reference to workers) from its name in early 1932. For the May Day that year, Sloboda's co-founder Josip Šiber placed the Red flag on the club's facilities. While the authorities conducted an investigation into the event, the flag re-appeared on the cliff overlooking the city. In December 1932, Sloboda ended up losing its license by the national police of the Kingdom of Yugoslavia and was forced to shut down because of "spreading communist ideas". Soon after, the club resumed its activities under new name – USK Građanski (Užički sportski klub Građanski) – which was the authorities' attempt to distance the club from its ties to workers as well as fostering a new civic identity. FK Era, the other club from the city, merged into Građanski. In the 1936–37 season, Građanski became champion of the regional Western Morava county league, but still failed to qualify to the national level second-tier Yugoslav Second League, losing the playoff tie. During those qualification matches, the club supporters traveled by bus to Kragujevac to support their team against the local club Erdoglija in what is considered to be the first supporters trip outside Užice. In 1938, the club was again banned by the authorities, but a year later, the ban got lifted, and the club continued this time under yet another new name Budućnost. However, the Second World War began soon. During the occupation of the country by Axis forces, the club did not have any activity, and most of its players participated in fighting to liberate the country. Many of them perished during the war.

=== Post World War II (1945–1991) ===
On 5 May 1945, the club was reestablished under its original name Sloboda, which means freedom (or liberty) in Serbian, and was now named FK Sloboda Titovo Užice (City of Užice was renamed to Titovo Užice). Next year the club won the local league and played for several years in the regional Serbian League. After the restructure of the football association, it became a member of the Kragujevac sub-division of the football federation. Until 1947, the club played its matches on the field in Krčagovo, but from then on began playing in a new stadium in Begluk, where under floodlights played its first night match against Metalac Belgrade. In 1956, the club reached its greatest achievement until then, by playing in the so-called IV Zone League (one of the 5 leagues forming the Yugoslav Second League) among other teams like Radnički Niš, Radnički Kragujevac, Rabotnički Skopje, Pobeda Prilep, Trepča Kosovska Mitrovica and others. The club suffered relegation after that season, but in that period it managed to accomplish some stability as regular participant in the Kragujevac Association League. In the 1962–63 season, Sloboda played the qualifications for the Yugoslav Second League against FK Bor, and after each team winning its home matches by 2–0, the final was played in Belgrade's JNA stadium, where it failed to win.

It was finally in its fourth attempt, in 1965, that the club managed to qualify to the Yugoslav Second League as second-place team in the Serbian League group South. In the qualifications it managed to overcome Belgrade's Železnik and Tetovo's Teteks. One of the club's most memorable nights during this period came on 19 February 1967, when the club held Yugoslavia's most successful club, Red Star Belgrade to a 1–1 draw in the Yugoslav Cup before losing 1–2 in extra time in front of 14,000 spectators. The following two seasons are remembered by the fans as the most successful until then. The club managed to conclude the first half of the championship in first place in both seasons, but on both occasions failed to reach the First League qualifications at the end.

Following this period, the league was restructured and some poor results saw the club drop down to the Serbian League (Yugoslav 3rd tier) where they remained until 1980, when it was promoted to the Yugoslav Second League East (the Second League was back then divided into two groups, East and West). Promotion was achieved with a crushing win over FK Topličanin by 5–0. In this period the club achieved stability, and in the 1987–88 season by finishing in the top half of the league table achieved qualification to the newly formed unified Second League. In this period, the late 1980s, the level of football played in Yugoslavia is by many considered the best ever.

=== First League of Yugoslavia and stagnation (1991–2010) ===
In the 1991–92 season, the club was at the top of the Second League for a long period, but at the end failed to gain promotion to the top league, achieving that in the following season, 1992–93 and qualified to play in the First League of FR Yugoslavia for the 1993–94 time. Despite wins in Čačak against Borac by 4–1, and in Pljevlja against Rudar by 1–0, because of the restructuring of the league it only played in 1995 against the best teams of the First League.

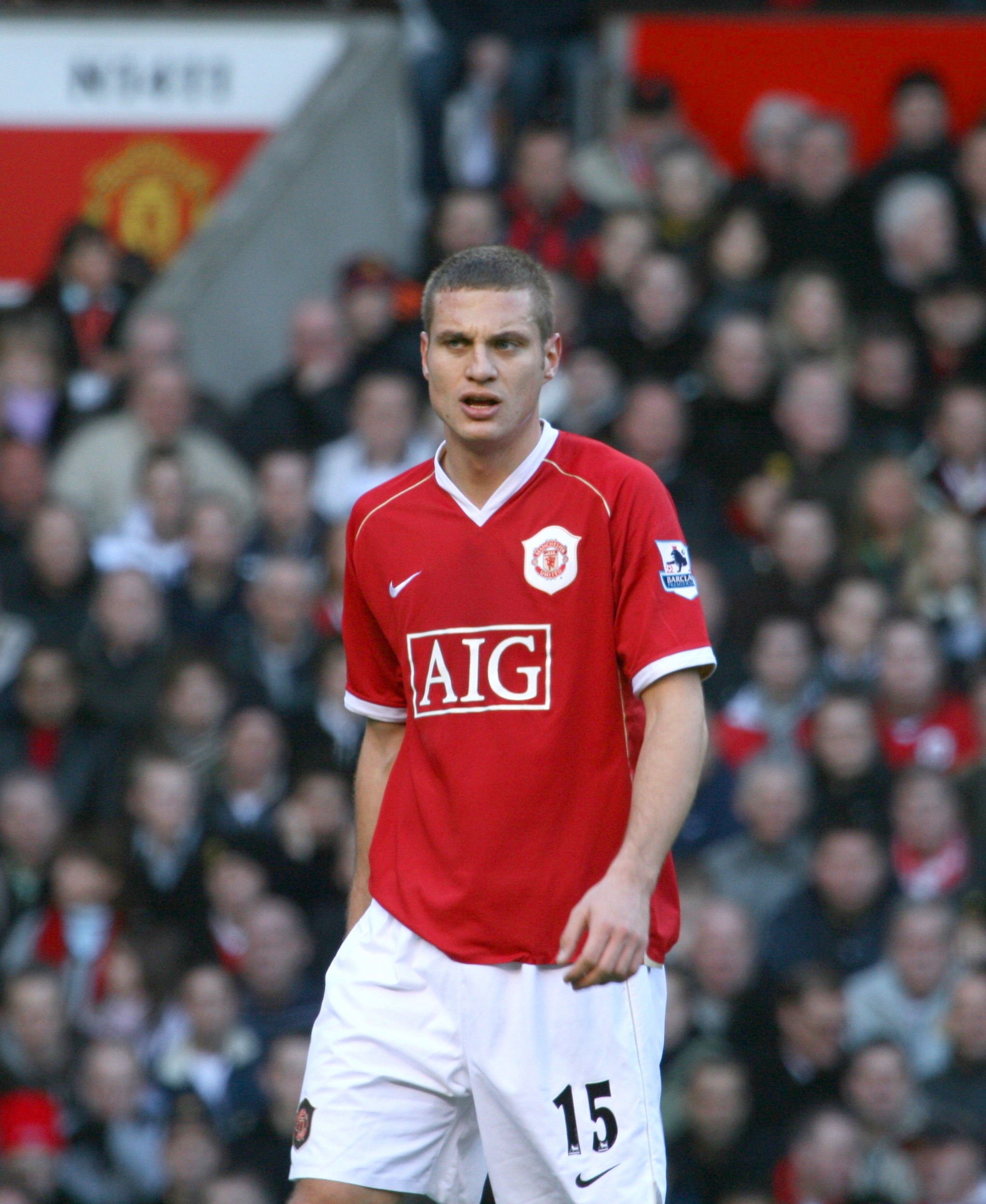
Former Manchester United captain Nemanja Vidić played with Sloboda Užice youth team between 1994 and 1996 before transferring to Red Star

In June 1995, it managed to stay in the First League by winning in the promotion/relegation matches the Second League FK Novi Pazar in Novi Pazar in a penalty shoot-out. The following season, 1995–96 it ended in 4th place in the B First League, qualifying to play in the A First League in the second part of the championship. But, at the end, it finished last, despite wins against Proleter Zrenjanin and Mladost Lučani.

In the following seasons the club suffered a series of relegations, and despite few participations in the Second League, the club ended up mostly playing in the Serbian League (third national tier) during the 2000s.

=== Merging with Sevojno and Serbian SuperLiga (2010–present) ===
In 2010 the club announced it merged with FK Sevojno, which had just been promoted to the Serbian SuperLiga, and from then the club played in the SuperLiga, under the new name FK Sloboda Point Sevojno, until the name Sloboda Užice was restored as the club's official name on 13 October 2011. In their first ever season, in the highest tier of Serbian football, they finished sixth, nine places off the relegation zone. They finished the 2011–12 Serbian SuperLiga season fifth and almost achieved Europa League qualifications. The 2012–13 Sloboda Užice season was the same they finished fifth for the second year straight. Also the 12–13 season will be remembered as the negative tradition breaking season. They won against FK Rad at home after 30 years, they achieved their first ever win over Serbian giants Red Star Belgrade away at Marakana, they won against FK Radnički Niš on Čair for the first time and they also won against FK Radnički 1923 away after 47 years. The following season the club got relegated from the SuperLiga on the final matchday after a 1–0 loss to Voždovac at home. Originally the club was meant to be playing in the Serbian League West in the 2016–17 season, with finishing 13th the previous season and getting relegated, but due to the exclusion of Sloga PM the club kept their First League status.

In 2019, after five turbulent seasons in the First League, Sloboda got relegated to the Morava Zone League, fourth tier of Serbian football and was renamed in GFK Sloboda. In June 2020, the club signed a cooperation agreement with Canadian club Serbian White Eagles FC. In 2022, the club got promoted back to the First League, by winning the Serbian League West. Within three years, Sloboda found itself back in the Serbian League West, having been relegated from the First League, by finishing bottom of the table.

== Stadium ==
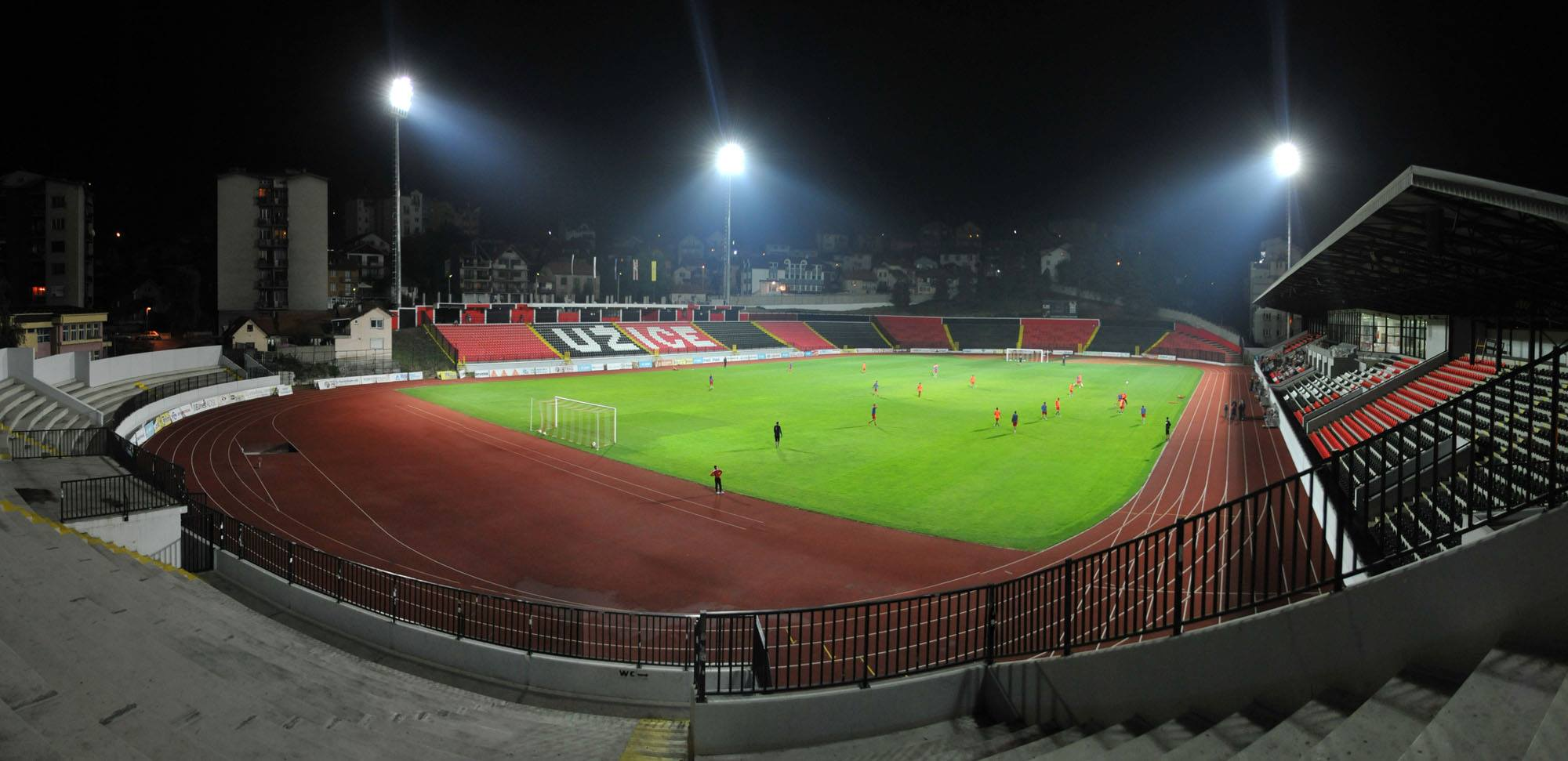
Radomir Antić Stadium at night

The Radomir Antić Stadium is a multi-purpose stadium and Sloboda's home ground. The stadium has a capacity of 15,000 spectators. In July 2013 it was announced that the stadium will have floodlights for the first time in club history. The first game under the floodlights was played against Partizan on 14 September 2013. On 12 August 2021, the name of the stadium was officially changed to Radomir Antić Stadium in honour of Radomir Antić.

== Supporters ==
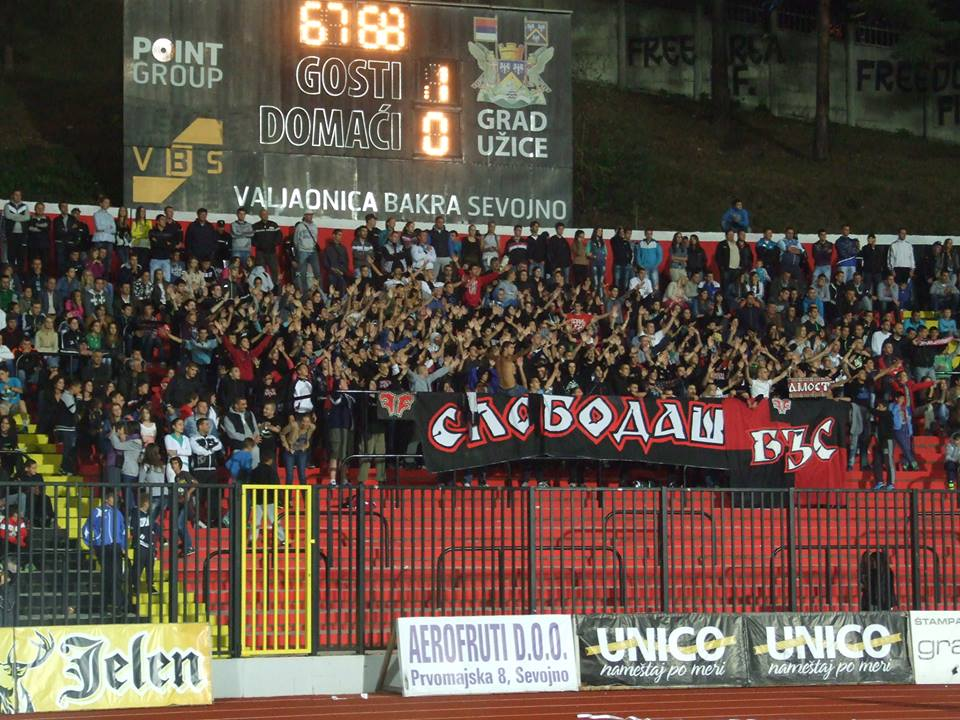
Fans of Sloboda

The organized supporters of Sloboda Užice are known as "Freedom Fighters" (Serbian: Borci za slobodu). The members of Freedom Fighters call themselves also "Slobodaši". They express their love for their city, club and region with many creative activities. The Slobodaši hold firmly to Serbian traditional values and are known as real supporters where sporting spirit is a priority. They are also well known for their fair behavior in the stands and their commitment to humanitarian aid. The basis of their support mainly includes chants, the use of flags, choreography and the display of banners. A well-known slogan of the Freedom Fighters is "Sloboda počinje" (lit. 'Freedom begins').

== Recent seasons (1996–present) ==
As of 7 June 2026

Season	League	Pld.	W	D	L	GF	GA	GD	Pts.	Position
1996–97	First League of FR Yugoslavia	33	7	7	19	27	52	−25	28	11th
1997–98	Second League of FR Yugoslavia	34	17	5	12	54	34	+20	56	5th
1998–99	Second League of FR Yugoslavia	21	5	4	12	21	27	−6	19	16th
1999–00	Second League of FR Yugoslavia	34	16	9	9	59	34	+25	57	5th
2000–01	Second League of FR Yugoslavia	34	10	9	15	37	45	−8	39	14th
2001–02	Second League of FR Yugoslavia	32	14	8	10	44	32	+12	50	9th
2002–03	Serbian League Morava	32	20	7	5	69	29	+40	67	2nd
2003–04	Serbian League West	34	18	6	10	53	31	+22	60	3rd
2004–05	Serbian League West	34	17	7	10	43	23	+20	58	4th
2005–06	Serbian League West	34	15	7	12	36	42	−6	52	5th
2006–07	Serbian League West	34	14	7	13	50	43	+7	49	9th
2007–08	Serbian League West	30	9	8	13	26	30	−4	35	12th
2008–09	Serbian League West	30	14	4	12	35	34	+1	46	3rd
2009–10	Serbian League West	30	16	4	10	43	26	+17	52	3rd
2010–11	Serbian SuperLiga	30	12	7	11	34	35	−1	43	6th
2011–12	Serbian SuperLiga	30	15	6	9	42	35	+7	51	5th
2012–13	Serbian SuperLiga	30	11	12	7	39	37	+2	45	5th
2013–14	Serbian SuperLiga	30	7	7	16	21	38	−17	28	16th
2014–15	Serbian First League	30	8	12	10	24	28	−4	36	12th
2015–16	Serbian First League	30	8	11	11	35	34	+1	35	13th
2016–17	Serbian First League	30	15	9	6	43	28	+15	54	3rd
2017–18	Serbian First League	30	9	7	14	23	35	−12	34	12th
2018–19	Serbian First League	37	6	8	23	22	70	−48	16	16th
2019–20	West Morava Zone League	16	14	2	0	42	7	+35	44	1st
2020–21	Serbian League West	34	17	6	11	51	38	+13	57	4th
2021–22	Serbian League West	30	19	6	5	43	19	+24	63	1st
2022–23	Serbian First League	37	11	18	8	42	41	+1	51	9th
2023–24	Serbian First League	37	11	13	13	34	39	-5	46	12th
2024–25	Serbian First League	37	7	10	20	23	42	-19	31	16th
2025–26	Serbian League West	30	9	14	7	33	24	+9	41	6th

== Current squad ==
As of 9 October 2026

Note: Flags indicate national team as defined under FIFA eligibility rules; some limited exceptions apply. Players may hold more than one non-FIFA nationality.

No.	Pos.	Nation	Player
—	GK	SRB	David Rosić
—	GK	SRB	Jovan Nenadić
—	DF	SRB	Mihajlo Dragićević
—	DF	SRB	Matija Dragićević
—	DF	SRB	Rade Glišović (captain)
—	DF	SRB	Mihailo Jovanović
—	DF	SRB	Luka Sarić
—	MF	SRB	Nikola Jovanović
—	MF	SRB	Danilo Kalajdžić
—	MF	SRB	Nemanja Milošević
—	MF	SRB	Nebojša Vujićić

No.	Pos.	Nation	Player
—	MF	SRB	Luka Ćirović
—	MF	SRB	Ilija Stojanović
—	FW	SRB	Andrej Đukić
—	FW	SRB	Veljko Plazinić
—	FW	SRB	Lazar Stajković
—	FW	SRB	Dimitrije Šmakić
—	FW	SRB	Đorđe Jakovljević
—	FW	SRB	Bojan Gajić
—	FW	SRB	Hamza Bronja
—	FW	SRB	Andrej Maksimović

== Technical staff ==
Updated 19 November 2026

Current technical staff
- Head coach: (Serbia) Nemanja Blagojević
- Assistant coach: (Serbia) Borko Nikolić
- Goalkeeping coach: (Serbia) Milojko Lojanica
- Doctor: (Serbia) Bojan Terzić
- Physiotherapist: (Serbia) Nemanja Drobnjaković

== Kit manufacturers and shirt sponsors ==
Period	Kit Manufacturer	Shirt Sponsor
2010–2013	Jako	Point Group
2013–2014	Jako	Farmakom MB
2015–	Jako	UNITRAG

== Notable former players ==
To appear in this section a player must have either:

- Played at least 100 games in Serbian top league.
- Set a club record or won an individual award while at the club.
- Played at least one international match for their national team at any time.
- (Serbia) Radomir Antić
- (Serbia) Dušan Arsenijević
- (Serbia) Filip Arsenijević
- (Serbia) Nemanja Arsenijević
- (Serbia) Darko Belojević
- (Serbia) Željko Berić
- (Serbia) Ivan Čančarević
- (Serbia) Milan Čančarević
- (Serbia) Dragan Ćulum
- (Serbia) Nenad Divac
- (Serbia) Slobodan Dogandžić
- (Serbia) Milovan Đorić
- (Serbia) Ljubinko Drulović
- (Serbia) Radiša Ilić
- (Serbia) Dragoslav Gardić
- (Serbia) Branko Gavrilović
- (Serbia) Tihomir Jelisavčić
- (Serbia) Slobodan Jagodić
- (Serbia) Ratko Jokić
- (Serbia) Vlasto Jokić
- (Serbia) Zlatko Krdžević
- (Serbia) Petar Krivokuća
- (Serbia) Rešad Kunovac
- (Serbia) Nikola Maksimović
- (Serbia) Đuro Marić
- (Serbia) Miloš Marić
- (Serbia) Slavko Marić
- (Serbia) Nenad Markićević
- (Serbia) Zoran Njeguš
- (Serbia) Bojan Ostojić
- (Serbia) Goran Pandurović
- (Serbia) Miroslav Pavlović
- (Serbia) Dragan Pejić
- (Serbia) Aleksandar Pejović
- (Serbia) Milojko Pivljaković
- (Serbia) Predrag Ranđelović
- (Serbia) Hajrudin Rovčanin
- (Serbia) Saša Simić
- (Serbia) Uroš Stamatović
- (Serbia) Srboljub Stamenković
- (Serbia) Branislav Veselinović
- (Serbia) Zoran Veselinović
- (Serbia) Mihajlo Vasović
- (Serbia) Dragoljub Vitić
- (Serbia) Mirko Vitić
- (Serbia) Miroslav Vukašinović
- (Serbia) Ivan Vukomanović
- (Serbia) Aleksandar Vulović
- (Serbia) Milan Živadinović
- (Armenia) Ognjen Čančarević
- (Bosnia and Herzegovina) Kemal Alispahić
- (Bosnia and Herzegovina) Nihad Nalbantić
- (Bosnia and Herzegovina) Dario Purić
- (Brazil) Tiago Galvão
- (Croatia) Mirsad Omerhodžić
- (Czech Republic) Tomáš Poláček
- (El Salvador) Vladan Vićević
- (Ghana) Francis Bossman
- (Liberia) Omega Roberts
- (Montenegro) Darko Božović
- (Montenegro) Filip Kasalica
- (Nigeria) Kevin Amuneke
- (North Macedonia) Tome Kitanovski
- (North Macedonia) Darko Micevski
- (Slovakia) Maroš Klimpl
- (Tajikistan) Nuriddin Davronov

For the list of current and former players with Wikipedia article, please see: Category:FK Sloboda Užice players.

== Historical list of coaches ==
List of coaches.

- (Socialist Federal Republic of Yugoslavia) Krešimir Arapović
- (Socialist Federal Republic of Yugoslavia) Đorđe Kačunković (1965)
- (Socialist Federal Republic of Yugoslavia) Dragoljub Milošević (1966-68)
- (Socialist Federal Republic of Yugoslavia) Marko Valok (1969–70)
- (Socialist Federal Republic of Yugoslavia) Petar Ćosić (1970–71)
- (Socialist Federal Republic of Yugoslavia) Terzić (1971)
- (Socialist Federal Republic of Yugoslavia) Marković (1972)
- (Socialist Federal Republic of Yugoslavia) Vukotić (1972–73)
- (Socialist Federal Republic of Yugoslavia) Dušan Radonjić (1988–91)
- (Socialist Federal Republic of Yugoslavia) Miroslav Vukašinović (1991)
- (Federal Republic of Yugoslavia) Ivan Čančarević (1992–94)
- (Federal Republic of Yugoslavia) Željko Berić (1994)
- (Federal Republic of Yugoslavia) Slobodan Dogandžić (1995)
- (Federal Republic of Yugoslavia) Milovan Rajevac (1995–96)
- (Federal Republic of Yugoslavia) Jestratije Jovanović (1996)
- (Federal Republic of Yugoslavia) Slobodan Jagodić (1996)
- (Federal Republic of Yugoslavia) Milenko Radivojević (1997)
- (Federal Republic of Yugoslavia) Slobodan Dogandžić (1997)
- (Federal Republic of Yugoslavia) Ratko Jokić (1997–98)
- (Federal Republic of Yugoslavia) Jestratije Jovanović (1998)
- (Federal Republic of Yugoslavia) Slavoljub Dimitrijević (1998)
- (Federal Republic of Yugoslavia) Slavko Vojičić (1999)
- (Serbia and Montenegro) Milan Čančarević (1999–00)
- (Federal Republic of Yugoslavia) Ratko Jokić (2000)
- (Serbia and Montenegro) Milan Čančarević (2003–04)
- (Serbia and Montenegro) Zoran Ristanović (2004)
- (Serbia) Predrag Ristanović (2004–07)
- (Serbia) Slobodan Dogandžić (2007)
- (Serbia) Željko Berić (2008)
- (Serbia) Ivan Čančarević (2008–09)
- (Serbia) Zoran Njeguš (2009–10)
- (Serbia) Ljubiša Stamenković (2010–14)
- (Serbia) Ljubiša Dmitrović (2014)
- (Serbia) Ivan Janjić (caretaker) (2014)
- (Serbia) Milenko Kiković (2014–15)
- (Serbia) Predrag Ristanović (2015–17)
- (Serbia) Goran Đukić (2017–18)
- (Serbia) Milan Bosanac (2018)
- (Serbia) Jovo Čučković (caretaker) (2018)
- (Serbia) Predrag Marić (2018)
- (Serbia) Slobodan Dogandžić (2019)
- (Serbia) Jovan Nikitović (2019–20)
- (Serbia) Slavko Matić (2020)
- (Serbia) Goran Đukić (2020–22)
- (Serbia) Vladan Vićević (2022)
- (Serbia) Zoran Kostić (2022–23)
- (Serbia) Blažo Bulatović (2023)
- (Serbia) Predrag Ristanović (2023)
- (Montenegro) Dušan Ivanović (2024)
- (Serbia) Ljubiša Stamenković (2024)
- (Serbia) Filip Arsenijević (caretaker) (2024)
- (Serbia) Ljubiša Stamenković (2025)
- (Serbia) Filip Arsenijević (2025)
- (Serbia) Nebojša Đokić (caretaker) (2025)
- (Serbia) Bojan Ostojić (2025–26)
- (Serbia) Miodrag Starčević (caretaker) (2026)
- (Serbia) Radmilo Azanjac (2026)
- (Serbia) Nemanja Blagojević (2026–)
