= 2015–16 Serbian Cup =

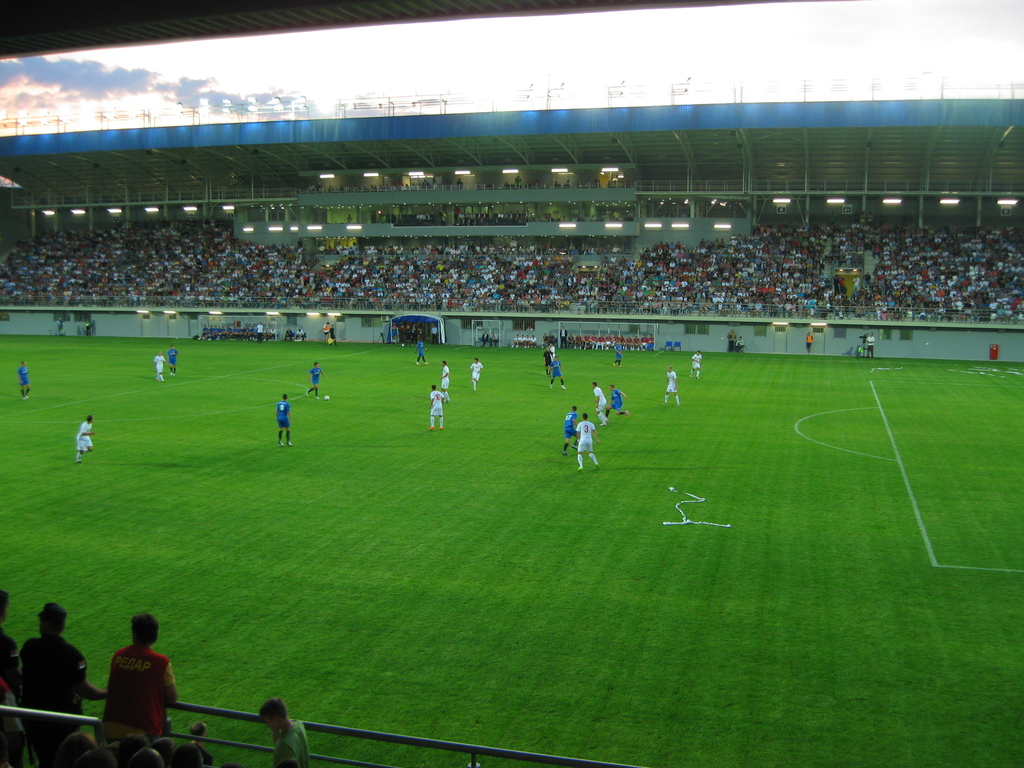
- Stadion Metalac hosted the final

Tournament details
- Country: Serbia
- Teams: 37

Final positions
- Champions: Partizan
- Runners-up: Javor

Tournament statistics
- Matches played: 38
- Goals scored: 85 (2.24 per match)
- Top goal scorer(s): Darko Zorić (Borac); Srđan Vujaklija (Borac) (3 goals)

The 2015–16 Serbian Cup season is the tenth season of the Serbian national football tournament.

The competition started on 2 September 2015 and concluded with the final on 11 May 2016.

Partizan, the winner of the competition, qualified for the 2016–17 UEFA Europa League.

== Calendar ==
Round	Date(s)	Number of fixtures	Clubs	New entries this round
Preliminary round	2 September 2015	5	37 → 32	10
Round of 32	28 October 2015	16	32 → 16	27
Round of 16	2 December 2015	8	16 → 8	none
Quarter-finals	2 March 2016	4	8 → 4	none
Semi-finals	16 March and 20 April 2016	4	4 → 2	none
Final	11 May 2016	1	2 → 1	none

== Preliminary round ==
A preliminary round was held in order to reduce the number of teams competing in the next round to 32. It consisted of 5 single-legged ties, with a penalty shoot-out as the decider if the score was tied after 90 minutes. This round featured the bottom 5 teams from the 2014–15 Serbian First League, as well as 5 regional cup winners. The draw contained seeded and unseeded teams. The bottom 5 teams from the 2014–15 Serbian First League (Sloboda Užice, Moravac Mrštane, Jedinstvo Užice, Sloga Kraljevo and Mačva Šabac) were set as unseeded teams, with the 5 regional cup winners (Zemun, Loznica, Jedinstvo Paraćin, ČSK Čelarevo and Mokra Gora) being set as seeded teams. The draw was held on 24 August 2015, and was conducted with the idea of minimizing expenses for the participating clubs. The matches were played on 2 September 2015. In total, around 4150 spectators attended the games (avg. 830 per game).

2 September 2015	Zemun (II)	1–0	Jedinstvo Užice (III)	Stadion Zemuna, Belgrade
16:00	Đokić 6'			Attendance: 300; Referee: Nikola Radaković

2 September 2015	Loznica (II)	2–0	Sloboda Užice (II)	Stadion FK Loznica, Loznica
16:00	Lazić 6'; Krstić 40'			Attendance: 1200; Referee: Bojan Krstić

2 September 2015	Jedinstvo Paraćin (IV)	0–1	Moravac Mrštane (III)	Gradski stadion, Paraćin
16:00	P. Jokić (red card) 40'		74' Nikolić	Attendance: 1000; Referee: Miloje Milićević

2 September 2015	ČSK Čelarevo (II)	1–0	Mačva Šabac (III)	Stadion Pivare, Čelarevo
16:00	Tanasić 57' (pen.)			Attendance: 150; Referee: Andrija Stojanović

2 September 2015	Mokra Gora (III)	2–2 (7–6 p)	Sloga Kraljevo (III)	Stadion Mala Marakana, Zubin Potok
16:00	Radojević 14'; Bešović 73'		61' Nikoličić; 83' (pen.) Parezanović	Attendance: 1500; Referee: Uroš Vuković
	Penalties
	Radojević (penalty scored); Đorđević (penalty scored); Voštić (penalty scored); Đaković (penalty scored); Baščarević (penalty scored); Drobnjak (penalty scored); Anđelković (penalty scored); Mlađović (penalty missed)		(penalty scored) Parezanović; (penalty scored) Trnavac; (penalty scored) Milošević; (penalty scored) Babić; (penalty scored) Andrić; (penalty scored) Županjac; (penalty missed) Pantović; (penalty missed) Kurandić

== Round of 32 ==
In this round, the five winners from the previous round were joined by all 16 teams from the 2014–15 Serbian SuperLiga, as well as the top 11 teams from the 2014–15 Serbian First League. The draw was held on 13 October 2015, and it contained seeded(16 teams from 2014–15 Serbian SuperLiga) and unseeded teams. Drawing of the lots was conducted by former national team player and head coach Ilija Petković. The matches were played on 27 and 28 October 2015. No extra time was played if the score was tied after the regular 90 minutes. Those games went straight to penalties. In total, around 19450 spectators attended the games (avg. 1215 per game).

27 October 2015	ČSK Čelarevo (II)	0–1	Borac Čačak	Stadion Pivare, Čelarevo
13:00			17' Đerić	Attendance: 600; Referee: Marko Popović

28 October 2015	BSK Borča (II)	3–1	Mladost Lučani	Vizelj Park, Belgrade
13:00	Gordić 51'; Bujšić 60'; Janković 92'		82' (o.g.) D. Stojković	Attendance: 400; Referee: Danilo Grujić

28 October 2015	Novi Pazar	0–2	Javor	Gradski stadion, Novi Pazar
13:00			30' Martusevich; 86' Josović	Attendance: 1500; Referee: Dejan Dimitrijević

28 October 2015	Zemun (II)	0–1	Spartak Subotica	Zemun Stadium, Belgrade
13:00			87' (o.g.) D. Đokić	Attendance: 300; Referee: Dejan Anđelković

28 October 2015	Proleter Novi Sad (II)	0–1	Jagodina	Stadion Slana Bara, Novi Sad
13:00			54' Savković; (penalty missed) 72' Knežević	Attendance: 500; Referee: Srđan Jovanović

28 October 2015	Moravac Mrštane (III)	0–3	Napredak Kruševac (II)	SC ORION, Mrštane
13:00			2', 23' Lemajić; 86' Ivelja	Attendance: 400; Referee: Aleksandar Živković

28 October 2015	Loznica (II)	1–2	Radnički Niš	Stadion FK Loznica, Loznica
13:00	Božić 35' (pen.)		4' Pejčić; 14' M. Krstić	Attendance: 1500; Referee: Nemanja Petković

28 October 2015	Kolubara (II)	0–0 (4–5 p)	Vojvodina	Stadion FK Kolubara, Lazarevac
13:00	Morariju (yellow card) 48' (yellow-red card)			Attendance: 3000; Referee: Petar Piper
	Penalties
	Stojković (penalty scored); Paunović (penalty scored); Bubanja (penalty scored); Z. Stojanović (penalty scored); I. Stojanović (penalty missed); Dinčić (penalty missed)		(penalty missed) Ivanić; (penalty scored) Paločević; (penalty scored) Maksimović; (penalty scored) Antić; (penalty scored) Ožegović; (penalty scored) Rosić

28 October 2015	Sinđelić Beograd (II)	0–2	Partizan	Stadion FK Sinđelić, Belgrade
13:00			48', 69' (pen.) Šaponjić	Attendance: 1500; Referee: Lazar Lukić

28 October 2015	Sloga Petrovac (II)	0–0 (1–4 p)	Voždovac	Stadion FK Sloga, Petrovac na Mlavi
13:00				Attendance: 600; Referee: Ilija Brdar
	Penalties
	Savić (penalty missed); Stefanović (penalty scored); Antanasijević (penalty missed)		(penalty scored) Mihajlov; (penalty scored) Zlatković; (penalty scored) Grujić; (penalty scored) Ristović

28 October 2015	Bežanija (II)	0–0 (6–5 p)	Radnički 1923 (II)	Stadion FK Bežanija, Belgrade
13:00				Attendance: 200; Referee: Dejan Santrač
	Penalties
	Živković (penalty scored); M. Milić (penalty scored); Rudan (penalty scored); Matović (penalty scored); Yu Dong-gyu (penalty scored); Divac (penalty scored)		(penalty scored) Vilotijević; (penalty scored) Živanović; (penalty scored) Gavrović; (penalty scored) Veselinović; (penalty scored) Nedeljković; (penalty missed) Samailović

28 October 2015	Mokra Gora (III)	1–3	Čukarički	Stadion Mala Marakana, Zubin Potok
13:00	Đorđević 66'		15', 39' Pavlović; 85' Mirosavljević	Attendance: 1500; Referee: Lazar Tripković

28 October 2015	OFK Bačka (II)	1–3	Red Star Belgrade	Stadion Slavko Maletin Vava, Bačka Palanka
13:00	Čeković 28'; Trivunović (penalty missed) 90'		41', 78' Katai; 61' Ibáñez	Attendance: 5000; Referee: Srđan Obradović

28 October 2015	Radnik Surdulica	0–0 (3–4 p)	Donji Srem (II)	Gradski stadion, Surdulica
13:00				Attendance: 1200; Referee: Milorad Milićević
	Penalties
	N. Stojanović (penalty scored); Putinčanin (penalty missed); Arsić (penalty scored); Suraka (penalty scored); P. Đorđević (penalty missed)		(penalty scored) Arsenović; (penalty scored) Mijailović; (penalty scored) Soldatović; (penalty scored) Rakić

28 October 2015	Inđija (II)	1–0	Rad	Stadion FK Inđija, Inđija
13:00	Tomanović 14' (pen.); Stanivuković (red card) 86'; Valentić (yellow card) 91' (yellow-red card)		(red card) 93' Trninić	Attendance: 250; Referee: Zoran Široki

28 October 2015	Metalac Gornji Milanovac	3–3 (6–7 p)	OFK Beograd	Stadion Metalac, Gornji Milanovac
17:00	Mladenović 57', 89'; Brkić 59'		28', 75' (pen.) Jovanović; 66' Andrić	Attendance: 1000; Referee: Robert Kiš Čepegi
	Penalties
	Brkić (penalty scored); Dopuđ (penalty scored); Mladenović (penalty scored); Đenić (penalty missed); Panić (penalty scored); Luković (penalty scored); Simov (penalty scored); Merdović (penalty missed)		(penalty scored) Jovanović; (penalty missed) Pejović; (penalty scored) Cuckić; (penalty scored) Damjanović; (penalty scored) Andrić; (penalty scored) Knežević; (penalty scored) Savić; (penalty scored) Ignjatijević

== Round of 16 ==
The 16 winners from first round took part in this stage of the competition. The draw was held on 18 November 2015, and it contained seeded and unseeded teams. Seeded teams: Partizan, Red Star Belgrade, Čukarički, Vojvodina, OFK Beograd, Radnički Niš, Jagodina and Spartak Subotica. Unseeded teams: Voždovac, Borac Čačak, Napredak Kruševac (II), Donji Srem (II), Javor, Inđija (II), Bežanija (II) and BSK Borča (II). The seeds were determined by last season's final standings in the Serbian top divisions. Drawing of the lots was conducted by former national team player and head coach Slobodan Santrač. The matches were played on 2 December 2015. No extra time was played if the score was tied after the regular 90 minutes. Those games went straight to penalties. In total, around 10270 spectators attended the games (avg. 1284 per game).

2 December 2015	OFK Beograd	5–0	Donji Srem (II)	Omladinski Stadium, Belgrade
13:00	Andrić 4'; Škrbić 14'; Pejović 27'; Cuckić 72' (pen.); Šalipur 78' (o.g.)			Attendance: 150; Referee: Milan Ilić

2 December 2015	Voždovac	0–1	Partizan	Stadion FK Obilić, Belgrade
13:00			29' Oumarou	Attendance: 2000; Referee: Igor Stojilković

2 December 2015	Jagodina	2–0	BSK Borča (II)	Gradski stadion, Jagodina
13:00	Savković 15'; Ivanović 90+1'			Attendance: 100; Referee: Novak Simović

2 December 2015	Spartak Subotica	3–2	Bežanija (II)	Gradski stadion, Subotica
13:00	Mrkela 16'; Bogunović 36'; Farkaš 89'		45+1' M. Milić; 86' Gojković	Attendance: 200; Referee: Nenad Đokić

2 December 2015	Vojvodina	1–0	Inđija (II)	Stadion Karađorđe, Novi Sad
15:00	Babić 77'			Attendance: 500; Referee: Aleksandar Vasić

2 December 2015	Napredak Kruševac (II)	0–2	Radnički Niš	Stadion Mladost, Kruševac
16:30			33' Ašćerić; 57' Marjanović	Attendance: 3000; Referee: Bojan Nikolić

2 December 2015	Javor	1–1 (4–3 p)	Čukarički	Gradski stadion, Ivanjica
17:00	Ajuru 15'		50' Mirosavljević	Attendance: 800; Referee: Vlado Glođović
	Penalties
	Josović (penalty scored); Eliomar (penalty scored); Ajuru (penalty scored); Dražić (penalty missed); Stojaković (penalty missed); Docić (penalty scored)		(penalty scored) Lucas Piasentin; (penalty missed) Pavlović; (penalty missed) Jovanović; (penalty scored) Srnić; (penalty scored) Mirosavljević; (penalty missed) Ostojić

2 December 2015	Red Star Belgrade	1–5	Borac Čačak	Stadion Crvena zvezda, Belgrade
17:00	Jović 54'		19', 45', 59' Zorić; 35' Vujaklija; 74' Jevtović	Attendance: 3520; Referee: Milorad Mažić

== Quarter-finals ==
The 8 winners from the second round took part in this stage of the competition. The draw was held on 24 December 2015, and it contained seeded and unseeded teams. The seeds were determined by following key: Last season's cup semifinalists were automatically set as seeded teams, while the remaining seeds were determined by last season's final standings in top Serbian divisions. Seeded teams: Partizan, Jagodina, Vojvodina and OFK Beograd. Unseeded teams: Radnički Niš, Spartak Subotica, Borac Čačak and Javor. Drawing of the lots was conducted by former national team player Jovan Aćimović. The matches were played on 2 March 2016. No extra time was played if the score was tied after the regular 90 minutes. Those games went straight to penalties. In total, around 3200 spectators attended the games (avg. 800 per game).

2 March 2016	Jagodina	0–2	Spartak Subotica	Gradski stadion, Jagodina
14:00			89' (pen.), 90+3' Mudrinski	Attendance: 500; Referee: Srđan Jovanović

2 March 2016	Borac Čačak	2–0	OFK Beograd	Stadion Borca, Čačak
14:00	Maslać 63'; Vujaklija 81'			Attendance: 1500; Referee: Majo Vujović

2 March 2016	Javor	2–2 (5–3 p)	Vojvodina	Gradski stadion, Ivanjica
16:00	Docić 25'; Đokić 89'		47' Ašćerić; 69' Babić	Attendance: 1200; Referee: Danilo Grujić
	Penalties
	Đokić (penalty scored); Josović (penalty scored); Docić (penalty scored); Dražić (penalty scored); Stojaković (penalty scored)		(penalty scored) Malbašić; (penalty missed) Rosić; (penalty scored) Babić; (penalty scored) Pankov

2 March 2016	Partizan	2–0	Radnički Niš	Stadion Partizana, Belgrade
18:00	Mihajlović 18'; Mihajlović (penalty missed) 50'; A. Stevanović 79'			Attendance: 0 Referee: Milorad Mažić

== Semi-finals ==
The 4 winners from the Quarter finals(Partizan, Borac Čačak, Spartak Subotica and Javor) took part in the semi-finals. The draw was held on 8 March 2016 and there were no seedings in the draw. Drawing of the lots was conducted by national team coach Radovan Ćurčić. Semi-finals were contested over two legs. First legs were played on 16 March 2016, and the second legs were played on 20 April 2016. In total, around 10000 spectators attended the games (avg. 2500 per game). The aggregate winners qualified for the final.

Team 1	Agg.	Team 2	1st leg	2nd leg
Javor	3–2	Borac Čačak	2–1	1–1
Partizan	3–0	Spartak Subotica	0–0	3–0

=== First legs ===
16 March 2016 SF	Javor	2–1	Borac Čačak	Gradski stadion, Ivanjica
16:00	Eliomar 7'; Dražić 49'		54' Kostić; (yellow card) 60' (yellow-red card) Krstić	Attendance: 1500; Referee: Dejan Dimitrijević

16 March 2016 SF	Partizan	0–0	Spartak Subotica	Stadion Partizana, Belgrade
18:00			(red card) 43' Tumbasević	Attendance: 3000; Referee: Milan Ilić

=== Second legs ===
20 April 2016 SF	Borac Čačak	1–1 (2–3 agg.)	Javor	Stadion Borca, Čačak
18:30	Vujaklija 55' (pen.)		63' (pen.) Docić	Attendance: 2000; Referee: Vlado Glođović

20 April 2016 SF	Spartak Subotica	0–3 (0–3 agg.)	Partizan	Gradski stadion, Subotica
16:30	Mudrinski (yellow card) 80' (yellow-red card)		2' Mihajlović; 84' Vlahović; 90' Bandalovski	Attendance: 3500; Referee: Bojan Nikolić

== Final ==
Winners from the Semi-finals took part in the single-legged final. The match was played on 11 May 2016.

11 May 2016	Javor	0–2	Partizan	Stadion Metalac, Gornji Milanovac
19:00			35' Jovanović; 90+7' Vlahović	Attendance: 4500; Referee: Milorad Mažić
