= 2015–16 Red Star Belgrade season =

Red Star Belgrade
2015–16 season
- President: Svetozar Mijailović
- Head coach: Miodrag Božović
- Stadium: Rajko Mitić Stadium
- SuperLiga: 1st
- Serbian Cup: Second round
- UEFA Europa League: First qualifying round
- Top goalscorer: League: Aleksandar Katai (21); All: Aleksandar Katai (23)
Home colours

During the 2015–16 season, Red Star competed in the Serbian SuperLiga, the Serbian Cup, and the UEFA Europa League.

== Competitions ==
=== Overview ===
Competition	Record							
Competition	P	W	D	L	GF	GA	GD	Win %
Serbian SuperLiga	37	30	5	2	97	27	+70	81.08
Serbian Cup	2	1	0	1	4	6	−2	50.00
UEFA Europa League	2	0	0	2	1	4	−3	0.00
Total	41	31	5	5	102	37	+65	75.61

=== Serbian SuperLiga ===
The 2015–16 season was Red Star's 10th consecutive season in the Serbian SuperLiga, since the league was formed during the summer of 2005.

==== Results by round ====
Round	1	2	3	4	5	6	7	8	9	10	11	12	13	14	15	16	17	18	19	20	21	22	23	24	25	26	27	28	29	30	31	32	33	34	35	36	37
Ground	A	A	H	A	H	A	H	A	H	A	H	A	H	A	H	H	H	A	H	A	H	A	H	A	H	A	H	A	H	A	H	A	H	A	H	A	H
Result	W	D	D	W	W	W	W	W	W	W	W	W	W	W	W	W	W	W	W	W	W	W	W	W	W	W	W	D	W	D	D	W	L	W	L	W	W
Position	1	4	4	4	2	2	1	1	1	1	1	1	1	1	1	1	1	1	1	1	1	1	1	1	1	1	1	1	1	1	1	1	1	1	1	1	1

Updated to match(es) played on 24 May 2015. Source: superliga.rs
A = Away; H = Home; W = Win; D = Draw; L = Loss

==== Regular season ====
Pos	Team	Pld	W	D	L	GF	GA	GD	Pts	Qualification or relegation
1	Red Star Belgrade	30	26	4	0	82	19	+63	82	Qualification for the championship round
2	Partizan	30	16	6	8	59	37	+22	54	Qualification for the championship round
3	Čukarički	30	15	8	7	37	22	+15	53	Qualification for the championship round
4	Borac Čačak	30	12	10	8	37	29	+8	46 (Note: Head-to-head record: Borac Čačak–Vojvodina 4–2, Vojvodina–Borac Čačak 1–1.)	Qualification for the championship round
5	Vojvodina	30	12	10	8	44	38	+6	46	Qualification for the championship round

Source: UEFA, Soccerway
Rules for classification: 1) Points; 2) Head-to-head points; 3) Head-to-head goal difference; 4) Head-to-head away goals scored (if two teams tied); 5) Goal difference; 6) Goals scored; 7) Fair-play ranking; 8) Draw.
Notes:

20 July 2015 1	OFK Beograd	2–6	Red Star	Belgrade
				Stadium: Omladinski Stadium; Attendance: 3,000

26 July 2015 2	Metalac	0–0	Red Star	Gornji Milanovac
				Stadium: Metalac Stadium; Attendance: 5,957

31 July 2015 3	Red Star	1–1	Radnički Niš	Belgrade
				Stadium: Stadion Crvena Zvezda; Attendance: 32,000

9 August 2015 4	Voždovac	2–3	Red Star	Belgrade
				Stadium: Shopping Center Stadium; Attendance: 4,949

12 August 2015 5	Red Star	3–1	Čukarički	Belgrade
				Stadium: Stadion Crvena Zvezda; Attendance: 25,233

16 August 2015 6	Radnik Surdulica	0–2	Red Star	Surdulica
				Stadium: Surdulica City Stadium; Attendance: 3,000

23 August 2015 7	Red Star	1–0	Javor Ivajica	Belgrade
				Stadium: Stadion Crvena Zvezda; Attendance: 34,000

30 August 2015 8	Mladost Lučani	0–3	Red Star	Lučani
				Stadium: Mladost Stadium; Attendance: 4,000

12 September 2015 9	Red Star	3–1	Partizan	Belgrade
				Stadium: Stadion Crvena Zvezda; Attendance: 40,261

18 September 2015 10	Jagodina	0–3	Red Star	Jagodina
				Stadium: Jagodina City Stadium; Attendance: 5,500

26 September 2015 11	Red Star	2–0	Novi Pazar	Belgrade
				Stadium: Stadion Crvena Zvezda; Attendance: 23,200

3 October 2015 12	Spartak Subotica	2–3	Red Star	Subotica
				Stadium: Subotica City Stadium; Attendance: 4,500

11 October 2015 13	Red Star	3–0	Vojvodina	Belgrade
				Stadium: Stadion Crvena Zvezda; Attendance: 24,720

17 October 2015 14	Rad	0–3	Red Star	Belgrade
				Stadium: King Peter I Stadium; Attendance: 3,000

21 October 2015 15	Red Star	3–0	Borac Čačak	Belgrade
				Stadium: Stadion Crvena Zvezda; Attendance: 17,500

31 October 2015 16	Red Star	4–1	OFK Beograd	Belgrade
				Stadium: Stadion Crvena Zvezda; Attendance: 21,000

7 November 2015 17	Red Star	2–0	Matalac	Belgrade
				Stadium: Stadion Crvena Zvezda; Attendance: 18,252

22 November 2015 18	Radnički Niš	1–2	Red Star	Niš
				Stadium: Čair Stadium; Attendance: 8,000

28 November 2015 19	Red Star	2–0	Voždovac	Belgrade
				Stadium: Stadion Crvena Zvezda; Attendance: 13,500

6 December 2015 20	Čukarički	2–7	Red Star	Belgrade
				Stadium: Čukarički Stadium; Attendance: 4,000

12 December 2015 21	Red Star	5–0	Radnik Surdulica	Belgrade
				Stadium: Stadion Crvena Zvezda; Attendance: 34,500

16 December 2015 22	Javor Ivanjica	0–3	Red Star	Ivanjica
				Stadium: Ivanjica Stadium; Attendance: 3,300

20 February 2016 23	Red Star	2–1	Mladost Lučani	Belgrade
				Stadium: Stadion Crvena Zvezda; Attendance: 27,200

27 February 2016 24	Partizan	1–2	Red Star	Belgrade
				Stadium: Partizan Stadium; Attendance: 26,000

5 March 2016 25	Red Star	3–1	Jagodina	Belgrade
				Stadium: Stadion Crvena Zvezda; Attendance: 32,122

22 March 2016 26	Novi Pazar	0–4	Red Star	Novi Pazar
				Stadium: Novi Pazar City Stadium; Attendance: 5,500

19 March 2016 27	Red Star	4–0	Spartak Subotica	Belgrade
				Stadium: Stadion Crvena Zvezda; Attendance: 22,173

2 April 2016 28	Vojvodina	0–0	Red Star	Novi Sad
				Stadium: Karađorđe Stadium; Attendance: 7,000

6 April 2016 29	Red Star	1–0	Rad	Belgrade
				Stadium: Stadion Crvena Zvezda; Attendance: 17,200

10 April 2016 30	Borac Čačak	1–1	Red Star	Čačak
				Stadium: Čačak Stadium; Attendance: 4,000

==== Championship round ====
Pos	Team	Pld	W	D	L	GF	GA	GD	Pts	Qualification
1	Red Star Belgrade (C)	37	30	5	2	97	27	+70	54	Qualification for the Champions League second qualifying round
2	Partizan	37	20	7	10	72	44	+28	40	Qualification for the Europa League second qualifying round (Note: Since the winners of the 2015–16 Serbian Cup, Partizan, qualified for European competition based on league position, the spot awarded to the second-placed team (Europa League first qualifying round) was passed to the fourth-placed team.)
3	Čukarički	37	19	8	10	48	35	+13	39	Qualification for the Europa League first qualifying round
4	Vojvodina	37	16	11	10	57	44	+13	36	Qualification for the Europa League first qualifying round
5	Radnički Niš	37	16	9	12	40	35	+5	35	
6	Borac Čačak	37	14	11	12	46	43	+3	30	
7	Voždovac	37	11	12	14	34	36	−2	25	
8	Radnik Surdulica	37	11	11	15	41	65	−24	25	

Source: UEFA, Soccerway
Rules for classification: 1) Points; 2) Points in regular season; 3) Head-to-head points in regular season; 4) Head-to-head goal difference in regular season; 5) Head-to-head away goals scored in regular season (if two teams tied); 6) Goal difference; 7) Goals scored; 8) Fair-play ranking; 9) Play-off (if two teams tied); 10) Draw (if three or more teams tied).
(Note: Criterion 9 is only used if deciding Champion and places for European competitions.)
(C) Champions
Notes:

16 April 2016 31	Red Star	1–1	FK Partizan	Belgrade
				Stadium: Stadion Crvena Zvezda; Attendance: 38,523

18 May 2016 32	Borac Čačak	1–5	Red Star	Čačak
				Stadium: Čačak Stadium; Attendance: 1,500

27 April 2016 33	Red Star	1–2	FK Čukarički	Belgrade
				Stadium: Stadion Crvena Zvezda; Attendance: 0

3 May 2016 34	FK Voždovac	0–1	Red Star	Belgrade
				Stadium: Shopping Center Stadium; Attendance: 1,000

7 May 2016 35	Red Star	1–3	FK Vojvodina	Belgrade
				Stadium: Stadion Crvena Zvezda; Attendance: 0

14 May 2016 36	FK Radnik	1–4	Red Star	Surdulica
				Stadium: Surdulica City Stadium; Attendance: 2,300

21 May 2016 37	Red Star	2–0	Radnički Niš	Belgrade
				Stadium: Stadion Crvena Zvezda; Attendance: 42,300

=== Serbian Cup ===
==== Matches ====
28 October 2015 First round	Bačka Bačka Palanka	1–3	Red Star	Bačka Palanka
				Stadium: Stadion Slavko Maletin Vava; Attendance: 5,000

2 December 2015 Second round	Red Star	1–5	FK Borac Čačak	Belgrade
				Stadium: Stadion Crvena Zvezda; Attendance: 3,520

=== UEFA Europa League ===
==== First qualifying round ====
2 July 2015 First leg	(Serbia) Red Star	0–2	FC Kairat (Kazakhstan)	Belgrade
				Stadium: Stadion Crvena Zvezda; Attendance: 25,211

9 July 2015 Second leg	(Kazakhstan) FC Kairat	2–1 (4–1 agg.)	Red Star (Serbia)	Almaty
				Stadium: Central Stadium; Attendance: 21,550
