= Dejan Parezanović =

Serbian footballer

Personal information
- Full name: Dejan Parezanović
- Date of birth: 16 April 1994 (age 32)
- Place of birth: Kraljevo, FR Yugoslavia
- Height: 1.80 m (5 ft 11 in)
- Positions: Left-back; centre-back

Youth career
- Bubamara Kraljevo
- Sloga Kraljevo

Senior career*
Years	Team	Apps	(Gls)
2012–2015	Sloga Kraljevo	27	(3)
2013–2014	→ Partizan Bumbarevo Brdo (loan)	25	(1)
2016	Bežanija	1	(0)
2016–2017	Spartak Subotica	0	(0)
2016	→ Bačka 1901 (loan)	0	(0)
2017	→ OFK Odžaci (loan)	0	(0)
2017–2019	Sloga Kraljevo	19	(7)
- * Club domestic league appearances and goals as of 5 May 2018

Dejan Parezanović (Serbian Cyrillic: Дејан Парезановић; born 16 April 1994) is a former Serbian football defender and played primarily in the left back position. His older brother, Dragan, is also a footballer.

== Club career ==
=== Sloga Kraljevo ===
Born in Kraljevo, Parezanović started playing football with local football academy Bubamara. Later he moved to Sloga Kraljevo, where he passed all youth categories. He joined the first team for the 2011–12 Serbian First League season, and made 2 caps for the spring 2012. He spent 2012–13 season with U19 team, and after ended his youth career, Dejan was loaned to Partizan Bumbarevo Brdo for the 2013–14 season.

==== 2014–15 season ====
Parezanović returned in Sloga for the 2014–15 season, after almost the whole squad from the past season left the club. He started season as the first choice, but after several lost matches in row and without points, Borko Milenković signed for Sloga and Parezanović moved on the bench. However, after several players left the club after bad results, Milenković changed position to centre-back, so Parezanović returned in starting 11 for the 9th fixture match against BSK Borča, and played the rest of matches until the first half-season. For the spring part of season, coach Veljko Dovedan just used him for a match against Proleter Novi Sad.

==== 2015–16 season ====
After Sloga relegated to the Serbian League West, Parezanović stayed in the club as one of the experienced players along with captain Aleksandar Božović and a group of youth players. He scored a goal in the opening match of the 2015–16 Serbian League West season, against Šumadija 1903. Later, he was a scorer in a match against Polet Ljubić in the 3rd fixture and also made an assist on that game, so he was nominated for man of the match. In a cup match against Mokra Gora played on 2 September 2015, Parezanović scored a goal for the regular time, and later also scored one in the penalty shootout. He also scored a goal versus FAP. With total 3 goals on 13 league matches and 1 in cup, all from penalties, Parezanović was the team's best scorer for the first half-season. In the winter break off-season, he left the club.

=== Bežanija and Spartak Subotica ===
At the beginning of 2016, Parezanović moved to Bežanija. He made one appearance for the club in an away match against Dinamo Vranje. That summer, he signed with Serbian SuperLiga side Spartak Subotica, but moved on loan to Bačka 1901 shortly afterward. For the second half-season, Parezanović optionally loaned to OFK Odžaci, but also stayed with the Spartak reserves, playing friendly matches with the first team.

=== Return to Sloga Kraljevo ===
In August 2017, Parezanović returned to his home club Sloga Kraljevo. He scored from penalty kick on his premiere match in 5–0 home victory over Dragačevo. After he replaced suspended Vladimir Čolić as a left-back in the third fixture match of the 2017–18 season in the Morava Zone League, Parezanović adapted as a centre-back since the next fixture match. He also scored a penalty against Slavija Kragujevac, in the same month. He scored his third goal of the season in match 15 against Jošanica. Parezanović has been promoted as a captain in a match against on 5 May 2018, when he was also elected for a player of the match in 0–0 draw to Takovo.

== Career statistics ==
As of 5 May 2018

Appearances and goals by club, season and competition
Club	Season	League			Cup		Continental		Other		Total	
Club	Season	Division	Apps	Goals	Apps	Goals	Apps	Goals	Apps	Goals	Apps	Goals
Sloga Kraljevo	2011–12	Serbian First League	2	0	—		—		—		2	0
Sloga Kraljevo	2012–13	Serbian First League	0	0	0	0	—		—		0	0
Sloga Kraljevo	2013–14	Serbian First League	0	0	0	0	—		—		0	0
Sloga Kraljevo	2014–15	Serbian First League	12	0	1	0	—		—		13	0
Sloga Kraljevo	2015–16	Serbian League West	13	3	1 (Note: Including preliminary round match against Mokra Gora)	1	—		—		14	4
Sloga Kraljevo	Total		27	3	2	1	—		—		29	4
Partizan Bumbarevo Brdo (loan)	2013–14	Serbian League West	25	1	1	0	—		—		26	1
Bežanija	2015–16	Serbian First League	1	0	—		—		—		1	0
Bačka 1901 (loan)	2016–17	Serbian League Vojvodina	0	0	—		—		—		0	0
OFK Odžaci (loan)	2016–17	Serbian First League	0	0	—		—		—		0	0
Spartak Subotica	2016–17	Serbian SuperLiga	0	0	0	0	—		—		0	0
Spartak Subotica	2017–18	Serbian SuperLiga	0	0	0	0	—		—		0	0
Spartak Subotica	Total		0	0	0	0	—		—		0	0
Sloga Kraljevo	2017–18	Morava Zone League	19	7	—		—		—		19	7
Career total			72	11	3	1	—		—		75	12
