= 2014–15 Serbian First League =

Serbian First League
- Season: 2014–15
- Champions: Radnik
- Promoted: Radnik, Javor, Metalac (via play-off)
- Relegated: Moravac, Jedinstvo, Sloga Kraljevo, Mačva
- Matches played: 240
- Goals scored: 531 (2.21 per match)
- Top goalscorer: Stefan Dražić (Javor); 13 goals
- Biggest home win: Radnik 4–0 Kolubara (23 August 2014); Javor 4–0 Mačva (19 April 2015); Radnik 4–0 Metalac (23 May 2015); Mačva 4–0 Sloga Kraljevo (23 May 2015)
- Biggest away win: Sloga Kraljevo 1–4 Bačka (23 August 2014); Sloga Kraljevo 1–4 Sinđelić (16 May 2015)
- Highest scoring: Sinđelić 2–4 Radnik (13 September 2014); Sloboda 3–3 BSK (30 September 2014); Kolubara 3–3 Sinđelić (25 October 2014); Kolubara 3–3 Sloga Petrovac (19 April 2015); Moravac 4–2 Mačva (16 May 2015)

The Serbian First League (Serbian: Prva liga Srbije) is the second-highest football league in Serbia. The league is operated by the Serbian FA. 16 teams competed in the league for the 2014–15 season. Two teams will be promoted to the Serbian SuperLiga while the 3rd placed team will play in the play-offs against the 14th team in the SuperLiga. Four teams will be relegated to the Serbian League, the third-highest division overall in the Serbian football league system. The season begun in August 2014 and ended in May 2015.

== 2014–15 teams ==
Location of teams in the 2014–15 Serbian First league

Team	City	Stadium	Capacity	Kit makers	Official sponsor
Bačka	Bačka Palanka	Stadion Slavko Maletin Vava	5,500	Joma	Podunavlje a.d.
Bežanija	Belgrade	Stadion FK Bežanija	4,000	Kappa	Sto posto
BSK	Belgrade	Vizelj Park	2,500	Hummel	Đak Sport
Inđija	Inđija	Stadion FK Inđija	4,500	Erima	
Javor	Ivanjica	Ivanjica Stadium	4,000	Erima	Matis
Jedinstvo Užice	Užice	Stadion Krčagovo	1,500	Joma	
Kolubara	Belgrade	Stadion FK Kolubara	2,000	Patrick	
Mačva	Šabac	Stadion FK Mačva	5,000	Jako	
Metalac	Gornji Milanovac	Stadion Metalac	4,400	Nike	Metalac a.d.
Moravac	Mrštane	SC Orion	2,000	Nike	Orion
Proleter	Novi Sad	Stadion Slana Bara	2,000	NAAI	Novi Sad Gas
Radnik	Surdulica	Surdulica City Stadium	3,500	Legea	Municipality of Surdulica
Sinđelić	Belgrade	Stadion FK Sinđelić	1,500	Dacapo	Rubikon
Sloboda Užice	Užice	Užice City Stadium	12,000	Jako	None
Sloga Kraljevo	Kraljevo	Kraljevo City Stadium	5,000	Dacapo/Nike	Amiga d.o.o.
Sloga Petrovac	Petrovac	Stadion FK Sloga	2,000	NAAI	Premier Kladionica

== League table ==
Pos	Team	Pld	W	D	L	GF	GA	GD	Pts	Promotion or relegation
1	Radnik Surdulica (C, P)	30	19	7	4	41	14	+27	64	Promotion to Serbian SuperLiga
2	Javor Ivanjica (P)	30	17	10	3	47	19	+28	61	Promotion to Serbian SuperLiga
3	Metalac Gornji Milanovac (O)	30	16	7	7	43	29	+14	55	Qualification for promotion play-off
4	Bačka	30	14	6	10	37	30	+7	48	
5	Inđija	30	14	4	12	39	31	+8	46	
6	Sinđelić Beograd	30	12	4	14	40	39	+1	40	
7	Proleter Novi Sad	30	11	7	12	33	32	+1	40	
8	Sloga Petrovac	30	10	10	10	37	37	0	40	
9	Bežanija	30	11	7	12	25	27	−2	40	
10	BSK Borča	30	10	8	12	31	33	−2	38	
11	Kolubara	30	9	11	10	34	43	−9	38	
12	Sloboda Užice	30	8	12	10	24	28	−4	36	
13	Moravac Mrštane (R)	30	10	5	15	32	41	−9	35	Relegation to Serbian League
14	Jedinstvo Užice (R)	30	7	8	15	23	36	−13	29	Relegation to Serbian League
15	Sloga Kraljevo (R)	30	8	2	20	22	56	−34	26	Relegation to Serbian League
16	Mačva Šabac (R)	30	5	10	15	23	36	−13	25	Relegation to Serbian League

Source: fss.rs
Rules for classification: 1) points; 2) head-to-head points; 3) head-to-head goal difference; 4) head-to-head goals scored; 5) goal difference; 6) number of goals scored.
(C) Champions; (O) Play-off winners; (P) Promoted; (R) Relegated

== Results ==
Home \ Away	BBP	BEŽ	BSK	INĐ	JAV	JPU	KOL	MAČ	MET	MMR	PNS	RSU	SIN	SUŽ	SKR	SPM
Bačka		2–0	1–0	1–0	2–2	3–1	2–1	1–3	3–1	2–1	1–0	0–1	2–0	1–1	3–0	0–1
Bežanija	1–0		2–1	2–0	0–0	1–0	3–0	0–0	0–2	0–0	3–1	0–0	0–1	1–0	1–0	0–0
BSK Borča	0–0	1–0		1–1	2–2	1–3	3–1	1–0	0–2	1–0	2–0	0–1	2–0	1–0	2–2	3–2
Inđija	2–0	1–0	1–0		0–1	4–1	2–1	2–0	2–3	3–0	2–1	2–0	4–1	2–1	3–0	2–1
Javor Ivanjica	1–1	3–0	2–0	2–0		3–0	2–0	4–0	0–0	3–1	2–0	1–0	3–2	2–0	1–0	1–0
Jedinstvo Užice	0–1	0–2	1–0	2–2	0–0		1–1	0–1	0–1	3–2	0–0	0–2	1–0	0–0	3–1	3–1
Kolubara	3–1	2–1	1–1	2–1	1–2	0–0		1–0	1–2	0–0	1–1	1–3	3–3	1–0	2–1	3–3
Mačva Šabac	0–0	1–1	0–1	1–0	2–2	1–1	1–1		1–1	2–0	0–0	0–1	0–2	2–3	4–0	0–1
MetMetalac Gornji Milanovac	3–0	2–1	1–1	2–0	1–3	0–1	0–0	3–0		3–1	2–1	1–0	1–3	1–1	2–0	2–0
Moravac Orion	3–1	2–0	2–2	1–1	0–0	2–1	0–1	4–2	0–2		0–2	1–0	1–0	2–0	2–0	2–0
Proleter Novi Sad	1–0	3–1	0–1	2–0	0–3	3–1	0–2	1–0	2–1	4–1		0–0	2–1	1–0	4–1	1–1
Radnik Surdulica	0–0	1–0	2–1	2–0	2–0	1–0	4–0	1–0	4–0	1–0	1–0		2–1	1–1	3–0	1–1
Sinđelić Beograd	1–3	1–2	1–0	0–1	2–0	1–0	0–0	1–1	1–1	3–2	1–0	2–4		2–1	3–0	3–0
Sloboda Užice	1–0	0–0	3–3	2–1	0–0	1–0	1–1	0–0	1–1	0–2	0–0	1–2	1–0		1–0	3–1
Sloga Kraljevo	1–4	1–0	1–0	1–0	2–1	1–0	1–2	2–1	0–2	1–0	3–2	0–0	1–4	0–1		0–2
Sloga Petrovac	1–2	2–3	1–0	1–1	1–1	1–1	4–1	1–0	2–0	2–0	1–1	1–1	1–0	0–0	3–2	

Source: Prva liga
Legend: Blue = home team win; Yellow = draw; Red = away team win.

== Top goalscorers ==
Including matches played on 23 May 2015; Source: Prva liga official website

Pos	Scorer	Team	Goals
1	(Serbia) Stefan Dražić	Javor	13
2	(Serbia) Milan Stojanović	Sloga Petrovac	12
3	(Serbia) Bojan Čukić	Moravac	10
3	(Serbia) Jovan Jovanović	Radnik	10
3	(Serbia) Marko Zečević	Bačka	10
6	(Montenegro) Luka Merdović	Metalac	8
7	(Serbia) Dragoljub Anđelković	Sloga Kraljevo	7
7	(North Macedonia) Dragan Čadikovski	Kolubara	7
7	(Serbia) Nikola Ćirković	Metalac	7
7	(Montenegro) Šaleta Kordić	BSK	7
7	(Serbia) Uroš Mirković	Sinđelić	7

^{* Player's name in italic indicates that the player is not playing in the league anymore.}

=== Hat-tricks ===
Player	For	Against	Result	Date
(Serbia) Milan Stojanović	Sloga Petrovac	Kolubara	4–1	4 October 2014
(Serbia) Jovan Jovanović	Radnik	Metalac	4–0	23 May 2015
