= Nnaemeka Ajuru =

Nigerian professional footballer

Personal information
- Full name: Nnaemeka Favour Ajuru
- Date of birth: 28 September 1986 (age 40)
- Place of birth: Enugu, Nigeria
- Height: 1.80 m (5 ft 11 in)
- Position: Defensive midfielder

Youth career
- Zamfara United

Senior career*
| Years | Team | Apps | (Gls) |
| 2004–2009 | Javor Ivanjica | 85 | (1) |
| 2005–2006 | → Metalac Gornji Milanovac (loan) | 22 | (3) |
| 2009–2013 | Vojvodina | 58 | (0) |
| 2013–2014 | Zestaponi | 15 | (0) |
| 2014–2016 | Javor Ivanjica | 52 | (1) |
| 2016 | Spartak Subotica | 16 | (0) |
| 2017–2018 | Jagodina | 36 | (1) |
| 2018–2019 | Sloboda Užice | 7 | (1) |
- * Club domestic league appearances and goals as of 26 November 2018

Nnaemeka Favour Ajuru // (born 28 September 1986) is a Nigerian professional footballer who plays as a defensive midfielder.

== Career ==
After starting out at Zamfara United, Ajuru arrived to Javor Ivanjica during the 2004–05 season. He was subsequently sent on a season-long loan to Metalac Gornji Milanovac, before returning to Ivanjica ahead of the 2006–07 season. In the following three years, Ajuru established himself as one of the team's most regular players, helping them win the Serbian First League in 2008, with an unbeaten record, thus earning promotion to the Serbian SuperLiga.

In June 2009, together with Miroslav Vulićević, Ajuru was transferred to Vojvodina on a three-year deal. He spent four seasons at the club, helping them reach the Serbian Cup final on three occasions (2010, 2011, and 2013), but failed to win the trophy.

In August 2013, Ajuru moved to Georgian club Zestaponi, agreeing to a two-year contract. He played regularly for the team in the first six months, but failed to make any appearance in the second part of the 2013–14 season. In July 2014, Ajuru had an unsuccessful trial at Azerbaijani club AZAL.

In August 2014, Ajuru returned to Serbia and joined his former club Javor Ivanjica. He helped them win promotion back to the top flight in his comeback season. In the 2015–16 Serbian Cup, Ajuru appeared in all six of his team's matches, as they lost to Partizan in the final.

== Honours ==
Javor Ivanjica

- Serbian First League: 2007–08
- Serbian Cup: Runner-up 2015–16

Vojvodina

- Serbian Cup: Runner-up 2009–10, 2010–11, 2012–13
