= Stadion Krčagovo =

Football stadium in Serbia

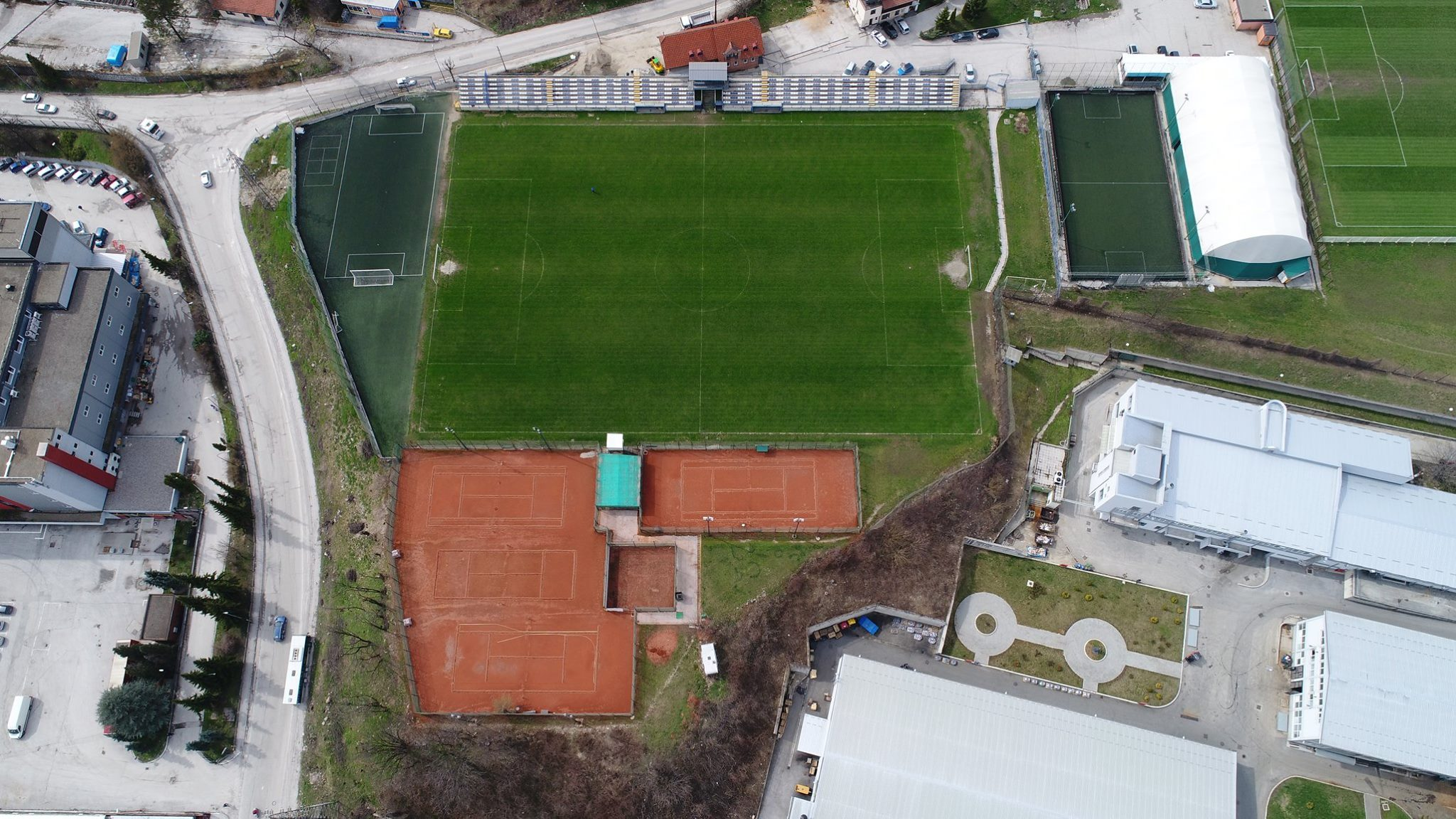
- SRC Krčagovo from air
- Interactive map of Stadion Krčagovo
- Full name: Sports and Recreation Centre Krčagovo
- Location: Užice, Serbia
- Coordinates: 43.849482°N 19.852582°E
- Capacity: 1,500
- Surface: Grass

Construction
- Opened: 11 July 1998; 28 years ago

Tenant
- FK Jedinstvo Putevi

Stadion Krčagovo (Serbian: Стадион Крчагово), also known as SRC Krčagovo, is a multi-use stadium in Užice, Serbia. It is mainly used for football matches and it is the home matches of FK Jedinstvo Putevi. The stadium has a capacity of 1,500 spectators.

== History ==
The stadium was officially opened on 11 July 1998 in the presence of a large number of sports fans, citizens, and sports officials from Užice's Township Assembly. The construction of the sports venue took a year. During that time, four tennis courts and a football stadium were built with stands that can accommodate about 1,500 spectators. Accompanying facilities are three locker rooms with bathrooms, a gym, a restaurant, and official premises of the club management. Putevi Užice was the main contractor for the construction of the sports center in Krčagovo. The company's workers completed the largest part of the job. By cutting the ribbon at the ceremony organized at the stadium, Radovan Jeremić, the director of the company Putevi and the president of the management board of FK Jedinstvo Putevi, officially opened the new sports center. The opening match was played between Jedinstvo and FK Partizan. The result was 0–4 for Partizan.

== Vasilije Mićić; the most deserving person for the construction of the stadium ==
Putevi Užice, owned by Vasilije Mićić, was the main contractor for the venue's construction. As the main financier of the club, he decided to build a stadium and all auxiliary facilities with his company. In 2003, he bought the hotel Palisad, within which he built 4 football fields, which would be used for the preparatory matches of FK Jedinstvo Putevi. He had planned to build 10 more such fields, but his death at the age of 76 prevented him from doing so. He died on December 20, 2020, in Moscow.
