= Manojlovce =

Manojlovce Манојловце
- Village
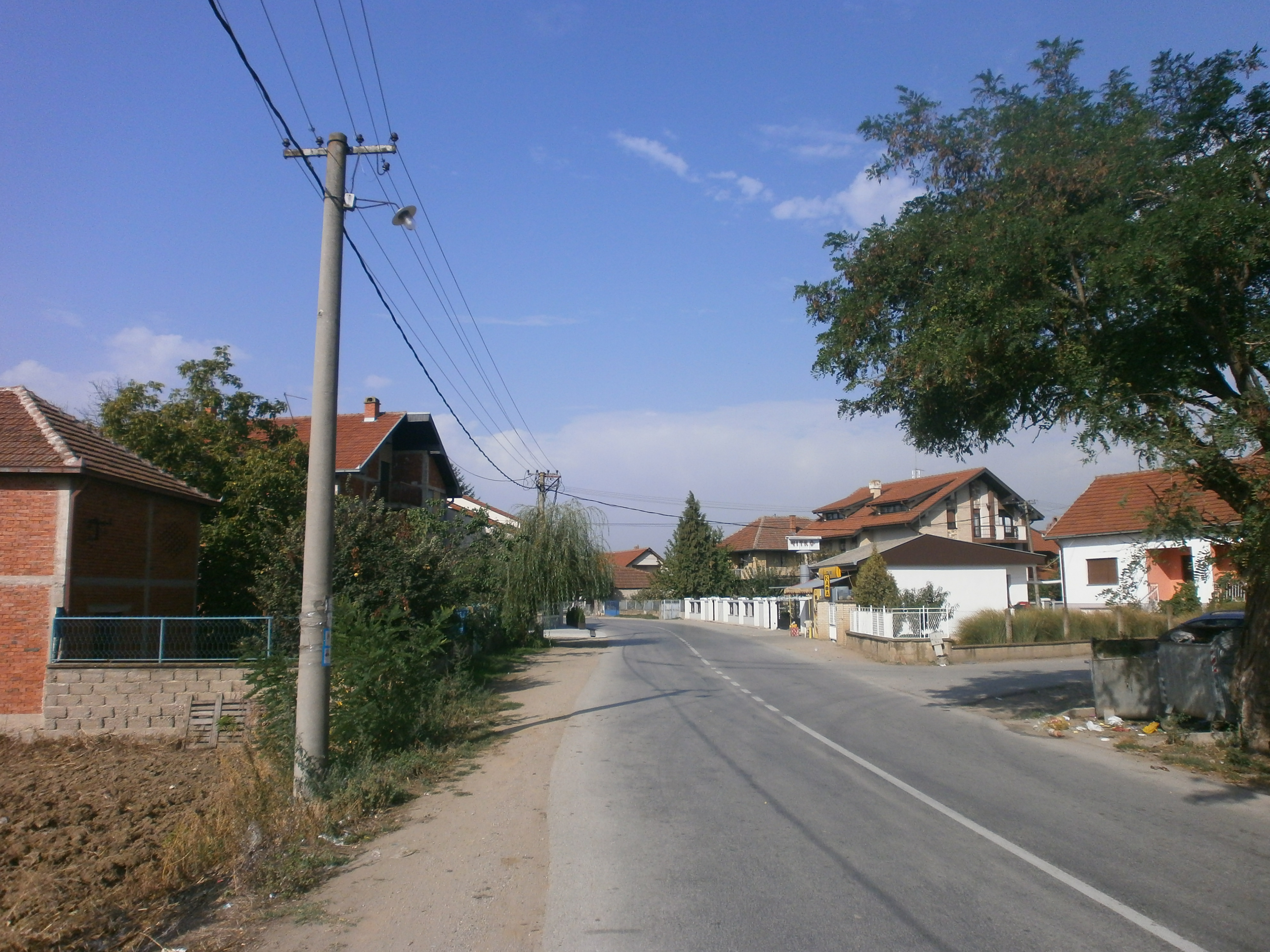
- Village's main road

- Location within Serbia
- Coordinates: 43°00′54″N 22°00′55″E
- Country: Serbia
- District: Jablanica District
- Municipality: Leskovac

Area
  - Total: 4.30 km^{2} (1.66 sq mi)
- Elevation: 258 m (846 ft)

Population (2011)
  - Total: 775
  - Density: 180/km^{2} (467/sq mi)
- Time zone: UTC+1 (CET)
  - Summer (DST): UTC+2 (CEST)

Manojlovce (Serbian Cyrillic: Манојловце) is a village located in the municipality of Leskovac, southern Serbia. According to the 2011 census, the village has a population of 775 inhabitants. Flok

== Trivia ==
On the eastern outskirts of neighboring Mrštane village, which is separated by A1 motorway with the rest of the village, there is an unfinished bridge over South Morava. Even though the bridge was constructed in 1998, it got a nationwide attention during the 2010s as it doesn't have access roads for over a decade. According to the reports it remains unfinished as it is not known whose jurisdiction it is to finish the bridge, of national road construction company Putevi Srbije or of Leskovac local authorities. The inhabitants of Mrštane, Donje Krajince and Manojlovce are using wooden ladders on each end of the bridge to access it as pedestrians.
