= Damir Čeković =

Serbian footballer

Personal information
- Full name: Damir Čeković
- Date of birth: 19 March 1990 (age 36)
- Place of birth: Novi Sad, Serbia
- Height: 1.80 m (5 ft 11 in)
- Position: Forward

Youth career
- Vojvodina

Senior career*
Years	Team	Apps	(Gls)
2009	Žilina	3	(0)
2010–2012	Novi Sad	8	(3)
2012–2013	Proleter Novi Sad	0	(0)
2013–2018	Bačka Palanka	101	(20)
- * Club domestic league appearances and goals as of 12:37, 22 February 2020 (UTC)

Damir Čeković (Serbian Cyrillic: Дамир Чековић; born 19 March 1990 in Novi Sad) is a Serbian football player.

== Career ==
He started his career in Žilina, then after an injury he moved to a lower division team, Novi Sad. In 2012 he moved to Proleter in the second division. In 2013 he made his move to Bačka Palanka.
