= Saša Lazić =

Austrian footballer

Personal information
- Date of birth: 6 April 1996 (age 30)
- Place of birth: Vienna, Austria
- Height: 1.85 m (6 ft 1 in)
- Position: Attacking midfielder

Youth career
- 2004–2006: 1. Simmeringer SC
- 2007–2010: First Vienna
- 2010–2013: Rapid Wien
- 2013–2014: 1. Simmeringer SC
- 2014–2015: Red Star Belgrade

Senior career*
Years	Team	Apps	(Gls)
2015–2016	Loznica	23	(3)
2016	Brežice 1919	4	(0)
2017	First Vienna		
2017	Rad Beograd	0	(0)
2018	Podrinje Janja		
2019	SV Schwechat	12	(1)
2019–2020	Wiener SC	7	(0)
- * Club domestic league appearances and goals as of 11 April 2020

Saša Lazić (born 6 April 1996) is an Austrian football midfielder.

== Career ==
Born in Vienna, Lazić played in youth teams of 1. Simmeringer SC, First Vienna, Rapid Wien and Serbian club Red Star Belgrade. He made his senior debut with FK Loznica in the 2015–16 Serbian First League. Then in summer 2016 he joined Slovenian second-tier side NK Brežice 1919, During winterbreak he returned to Austria and joined First Vienna. In summer 2017 he returned to Serbia and joined FK Rad, leaving them during winter-break to join FK Podrinje Janja playing in the First League of Republika Srpska, second tier of Bosnia and Herzegovina. After finishing his season with Podrinje, he returned to Austria and, after a short spell with SV Schwechat, he joined Wiener Sport-Club.
