= Putevi Užice =

Serbian construction company

Coordinates: 43°51′21.4″N 19°50′47.7″E

- Official logo
- Native name: Путеви Ужице
- Type: Joint-stock company
- Industry: Construction
- Founded: 14 July 2000; 26 years ago (Current form); 1962; 64 years ago (Founded)
- Headquarters: Nikole Pašića 38, Užice, Serbia
- Area served: Worldwide
- Key people: Leko Korićanac (General director)
- Revenue: ▼€139.68 million (2017)
- Net income: ▲€0.37 million (2017)
- Total assets: ▼€101.83 million (2017)
- Total equity: ▼€11.72 million (2017)
- Owner: Putevi Centar d.o.o. Belgrade (64.47%); Salink Ltd. (6.52%); Other minority shareholders
- Number of employees: 768 (2017)
- Subsidiaries: Subsidiaries
- Website: www.puteviuzice.com
- Footnotes; Business ID: 07156332; Tax ID: 101614596

Putevi Užice (Serbian: Путеви Ужице) is a Serbian construction company headquartered in Užice, Serbia.

== History ==
Putevi Užice was founded in 1962 in Titovo Užice, SFR Yugoslavia. It operated as government-owned enterprise until 1992 and since 1998 it operated as joint-stock company.

Putevi Užice was admitted to the open market of the Belgrade Stock Exchange on July 21, 2004.

== Activities ==
The Putevi Užice company constructs bridges, tunnels, airports, stadiums, official buildings and roads; in addition, it offers a road infrastructure maintenance service and produces construction materials such as stone, concrete and asphalt.

64.47% of the capital of Putevi Užice is held by Putevi centar d.o.o. Beograd and 19.44% by natural persons.

== Subsidiaries ==
This is a list of companies that are owned by Putevi Užice:

- Novi Pazar-put a.d.
- Putevi Požega a.d. (minority)
- Putevi Bijelo Polje d.o.o. Montenegro
