= Stadion Metalac =

Football stadium in Gornji Milanovac, Serbia

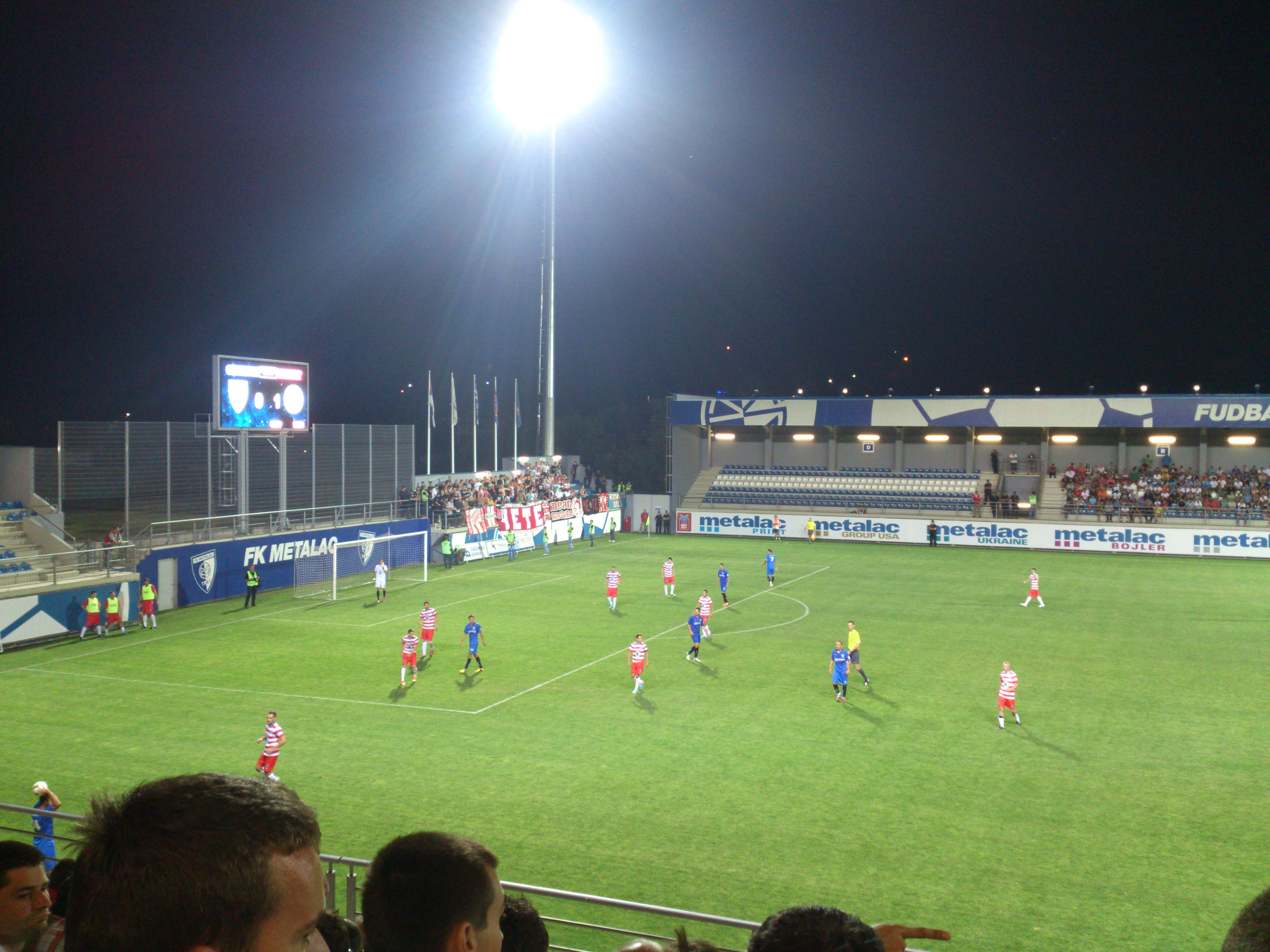
- View from the East Stand
- Interactive map of Stadion Metalac
- Location: Gornji Milanovac, Serbia
- Coordinates: 44.026381°N 20.466677°E
- Owner: Metalac a.d.
- Operator: Metalac Gornji Milanovac
- Capacity: 4,500
- Surface: Grass
- Scoreboard: LED

Construction
- Groundbreaking: October 2011
- Built: 2011–2012
- Opened: 12 September 2012; 13 years ago
- Cost: €3 million
- General contractor: Amiga d.o.o.

Tenant
- Metalac Gornji Milanovac (2012–present)

Stadion Metalac (Serbian Cyrillic: Стадион Металац) is a football stadium in Gornji Milanovac, Serbia. It is the home ground of Metalac Gornji Milanovac. The stadium consists of three stands with a total seating capacity of 4,350.

== History ==
=== Background and construction ===
Before earning promotion to the Serbian SuperLiga for the first time in 2009, Metalac Gornji Milanovac hosted its matches at the nearby Stadion SD Takovo, colloquially known as the Stadion kraj Despotovice, owned by local rivals Takovo. However, due to the league's stadium requirements, the club was forced to play its home matches in Kragujevac, Čačak and Lučani over the next three seasons before suffering relegation from the top flight.

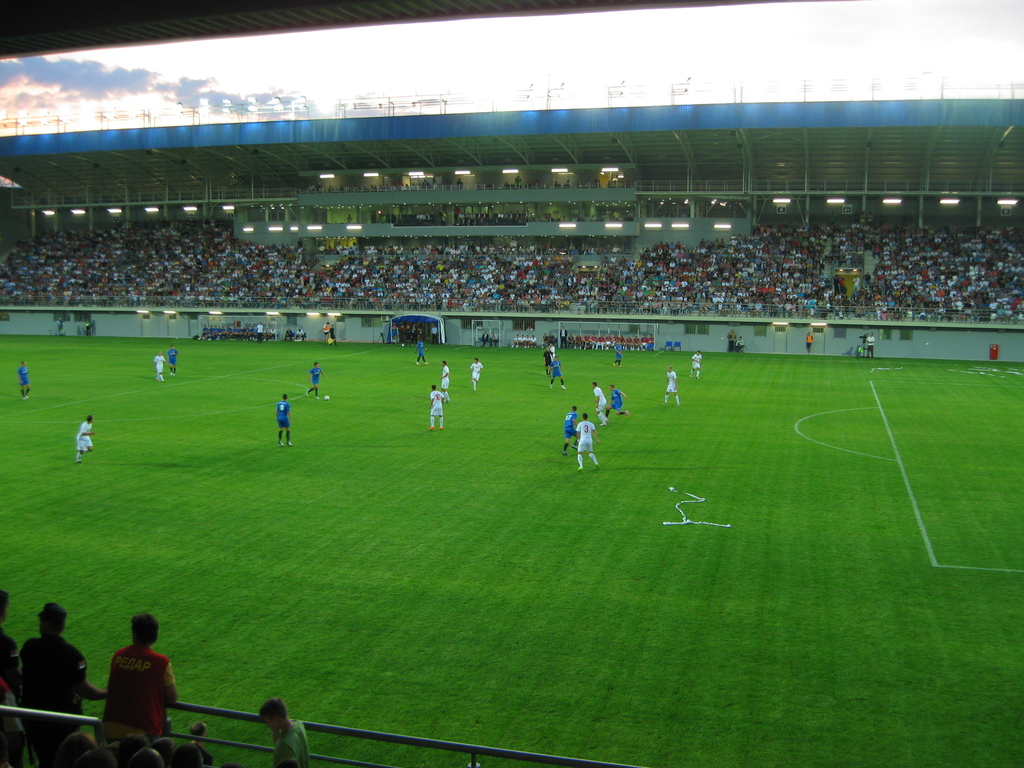
View from the East Stand

On 9 September 2011, Metalac a.d. signed an agreement with the local and national authorities to build a new stadium for Metalac Gornji Milanovac. The cornerstone was laid by Metalac president Dragoljub Vukadinović in early October of the same year. The construction was completed in the summer of 2012.

=== Opening ===
The stadium hosted its first game on 1 September 2012, as Metalac Gornji Milanovac recorded a 3–1 victory over Mladost Lučani in the fourth round of the 2012–13 Serbian First League. Metalac's defender Dalibor Rodić scored the first goal at the new stadium. The venue was officially opened 11 days later, on 12 September, with a friendly game between Metalac and Serbia B. Metalac president Dragoljub Vukadinović, FSS president Tomislav Karadžić and Serbia manager Siniša Mihajlović cut the ribbon during the ceremony before the match.

=== Notable matches ===
The stadium has hosted all four Serbia U21 matches in their 2015 UEFA European Under-21 Championship qualification and two of the team's five matches in the 2017 UEFA European Under-21 Championship qualification.

The stadium also hosted the final match of the 2015–16 Serbian Cup, as Partizan defeated Javor Ivanjica 2–0.
