= Javor Stadium =

Sports venue in Ivanjica, Serbia

- Стадион Јавора
- Стадион крај Моравице
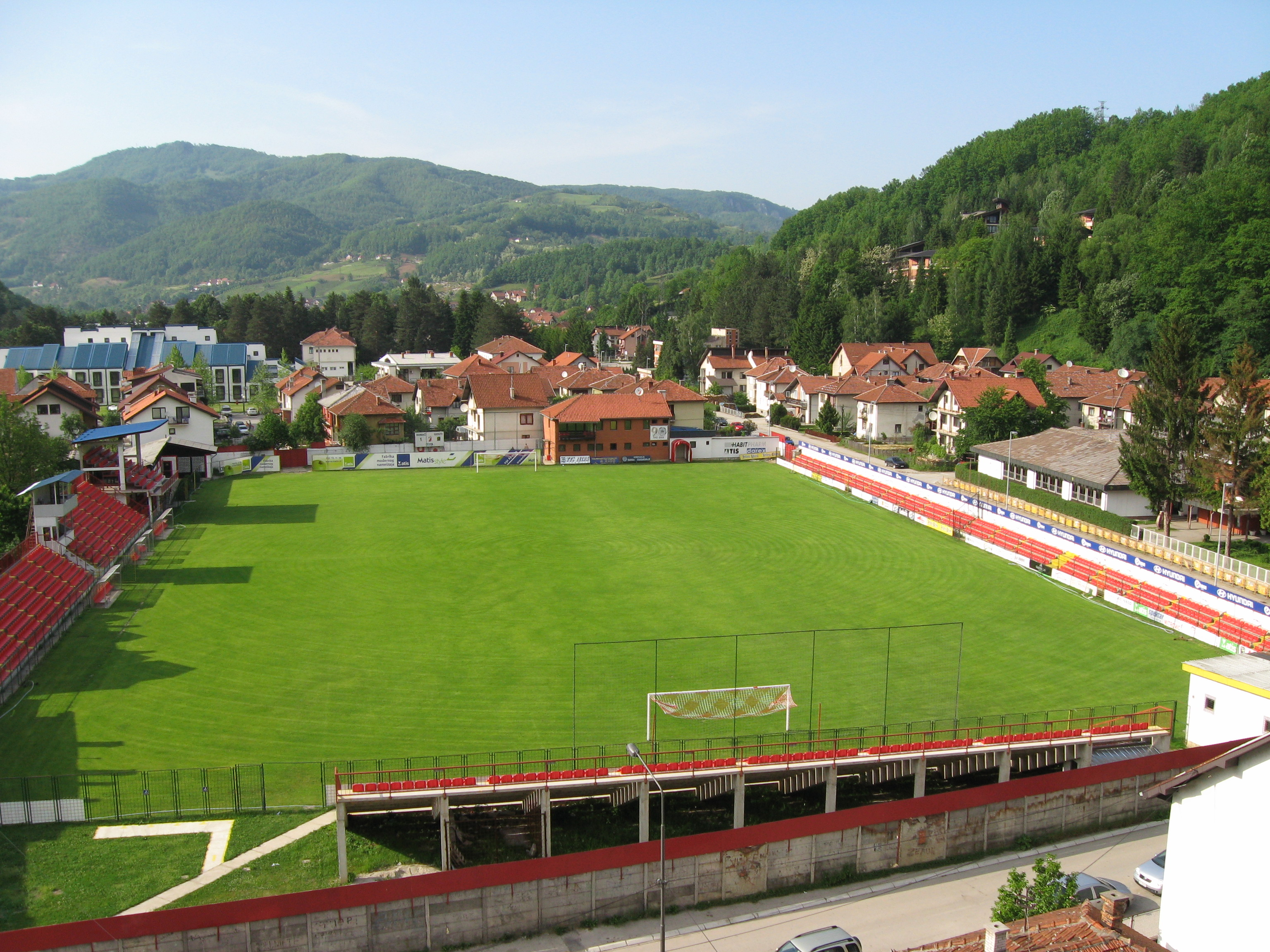
- Interactive map of Javor Stadium
- Address: Ivanjica; Serbia
- Coordinates: 43°35′10.04″N 20°13′38.06″E
- Elevation: 458 m (1,503 ft)
- Owner: FK Javor Ivanjica
- Operator: FK Javor Ivanjica
- Capacity: 3,000
- Surface: Artificial turf
- Scoreboard: LED
- Field size: 105 m × 68 m (344 ft × 223 ft)

Construction
- Renovated: 2002

Tenant
- FK Javor Ivanjica

Javor Stadium (Serbian: Стадион ФК Јавор / Stadion FK Javor), colloquially known as the Stadion kraj Moravice, is a multi-purpose stadium in Ivanjica, Serbia. It is currently used mostly for football matches and is the home ground of FK Javor Ivanjica. The stadium holds 3,000 people.

== History ==
In the summer of 2019, the stadium underwent minor reconstruction as part of preparations for start of 2019–20 Serbian SuperLiga season.

== Gallery ==
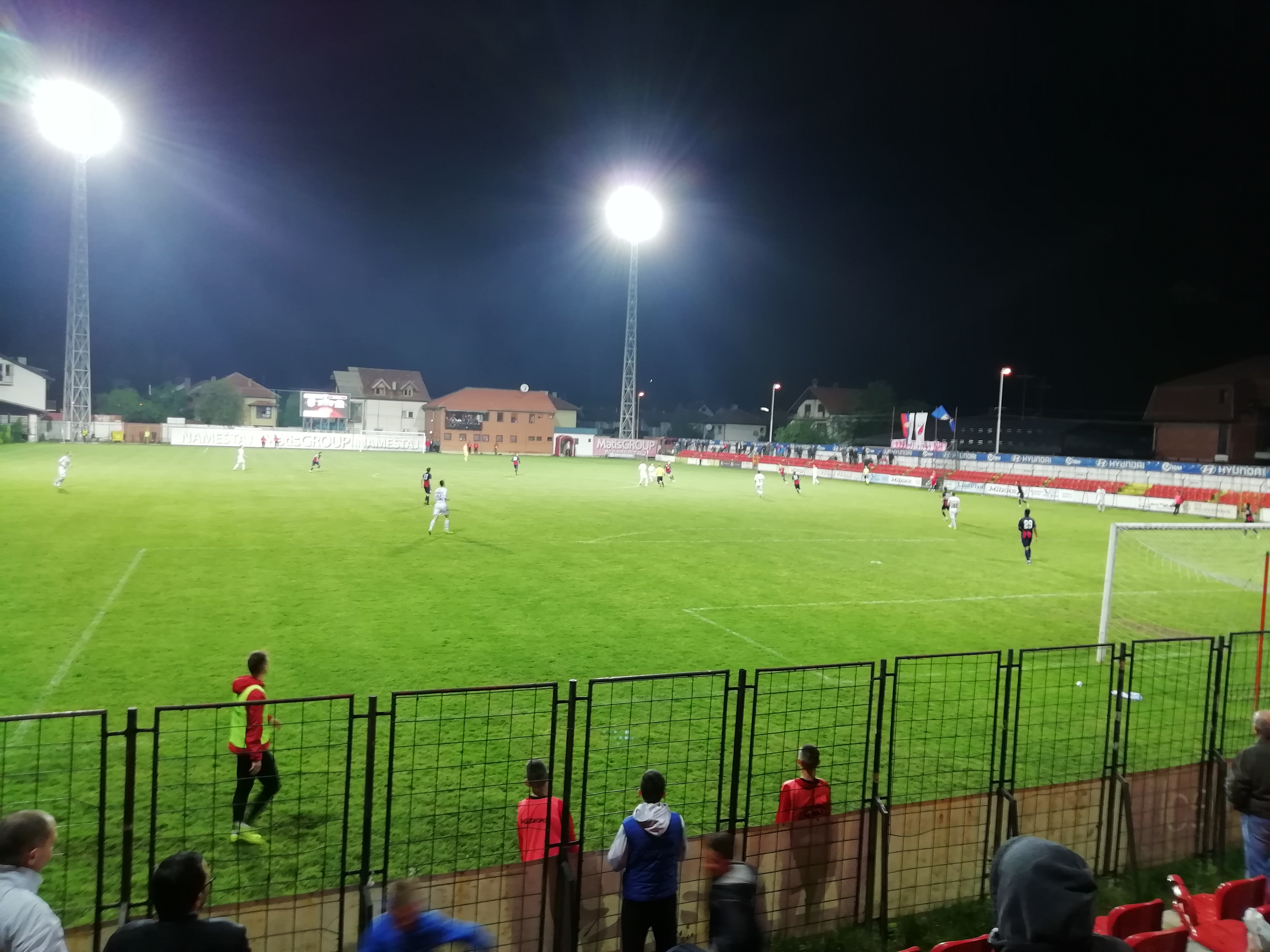
View on Football Field at night

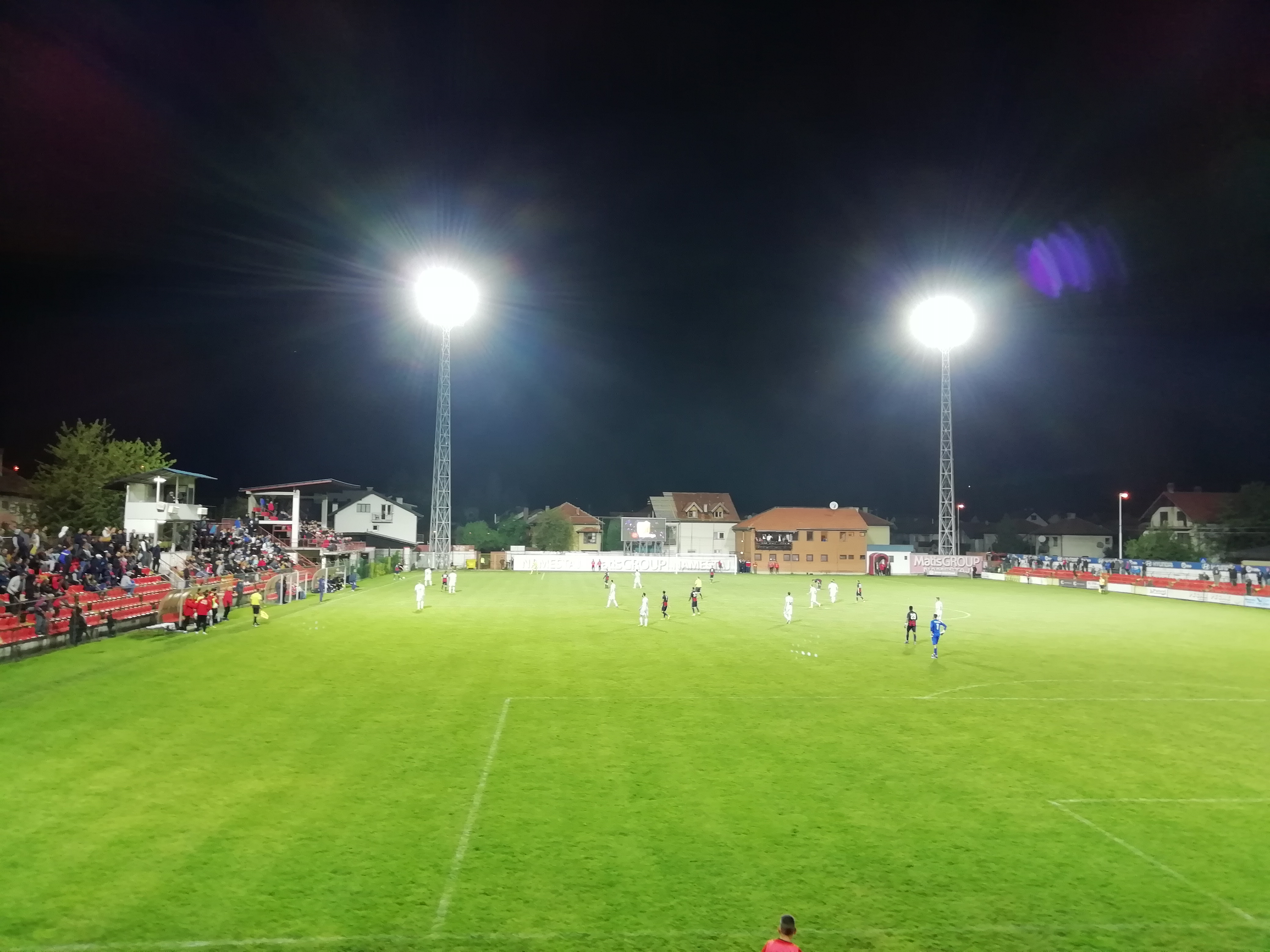
View from South Stand at night

== See also ==
- List of football stadiums in Serbia
