= List of Serbian football transfers summer 2009 =

This is a list of transfers in Serbian football for the 2009 summer transfer window. Only moves featuring a Serbian Superliga side are listed.

- If adding transfers, please add the external source in references list, at bottom.

== Serbian Superliga ==
=== Partizan ===
In: Note: Flags indicate national team as defined under FIFA eligibility rules; some limited exceptions apply. Players may hold more than one non-FIFA nationality.

No.	Pos.	Nation	Player
20	DF	SRB	Mladen Krstajić (From (Germany) FC Schalke 04)
2	DF	SRB	Siniša Stevanović (From FK Teleoptik)
21	DF	SRB	Branislav Jovanović (From FK Napredak Kruševac)
9	FW	BRA	Cleo (From (Portugal) C.D. Olivais e Moscavide, was on loan in Red Star Belgrade)
11	DF	SRB	Marko Lomić (From (Germany) TuS Koblenz)

Out: Note: Flags indicate national team as defined under FIFA eligibility rules; some limited exceptions apply. Players may hold more than one non-FIFA nationality.

No.	Pos.	Nation	Player
-	MF	BRA	Juca (To (Spain) Deportivo La Coruña)
-	MF	MNE	Nenad Brnović (To (Montenegro) FK Budućnost Podgorica)
-	DF	SRB	Ivan Stevanović (To (France) Sochaux)
-	FW	SRB	Milan Perić (On loan to FK Mladi Radnik, was on loan in FK Jagodina)
-	MF	SVN	Danijel Marčeta (On loan to (Scotland) Falkirk FC)
-	FW	SRB	Nenad Marinković (Was on loan in FK Teleoptik, loaned to (Greece) OFI)
-	DF	SRB	Milovan Sikimić (To (France) RC Strasbourg)
-	DF	SRB	Vladimir Branković (Was on loan in FK Sevojno, loaned to (Moldova) FC Sheriff Tiraspol)
-	DF	SRB	Ivan Obradović (To (Spain) Real Zaragoza)
-	DF	SRB	Bogdan Stević (On loan to FK Teleoptik)

=== FK Vojvodina ===
In: Note: Flags indicate national team as defined under FIFA eligibility rules; some limited exceptions apply. Players may hold more than one non-FIFA nationality.

No.	Pos.	Nation	Player
6	MF	NGA	Nnaemeka Ajuru (From FK Javor)
22	DF	SRB	Miroslav Vulićević (From FK Javor)
6	MF	ROU	Alin Stoica (From (Romania) FC Brașov)
25	DF	BRA	Marcelo Pletsch (From (Cyprus) AC Omonia)
24	DF	SRB	Dejan Karan (Loan return from FK Novi Sad)
7	DF	SRB	Ivan Gvozdenović (Free, from Red Star Belgrade)

Out: Note: Flags indicate national team as defined under FIFA eligibility rules; some limited exceptions apply. Players may hold more than one non-FIFA nationality.

No.	Pos.	Nation	Player
-	DF	SRB	Igor Đurić (To (Netherlands) SC Heerenveen)
-	FW	SRB	Miodrag Pantelić (retired)
-	DF	SRB	Miodrag Stošić (To (France) Nîmes Olympique)
-	MF	SRB	Veseljko Trivunović (To OFK Belgrade)
-	DF	SRB	Vladan Pavlović (To FK Javor)
-	FW	SRB	Nenad Stojanović (To FK Javor)
-	FW	SRB	Vladimir Buač (To (France) Nîmes Olympique)
-	DF	MNE	Stefan Zogović (Came from Youth academy, loaned to FK Palić)
-	MF	BRA	Leandro Rodrigues (On loan to FK Napredak Kruševac)
-	DF	SRB	Aleksandar Mijatović (released)
-	FW	SRB	Žarko Lazetić (To (Greece) Diagoras F.C.)
-	MF	AUT	Aleksandar Popović (To (Greece) Kavala F.C.)
-	DF	AUS	Aleksandar Jovanović (On loan to FK Novi Sad)
-	MF	BIH	Miroslav Stevanović (On loan to FK Palić)
-	MF	SRB	Vuk Mitošević (On loan to FK Palić)
-	MF	SRB	Vladimir Vukajlović (To (Slovakia) FK Senica)

=== Red Star Belgrade ===
In: Note: Flags indicate national team as defined under FIFA eligibility rules; some limited exceptions apply. Players may hold more than one non-FIFA nationality.

No.	Pos.	Nation	Player
21	FW	SRB	Aleksandar Jevtić (From (Turkey) Hacettepe SK, was on loan in OFK Belgrade)
23	FW	SRB	Slavko Perović (Loan return from FK Napredak Kruševac)
28	DF	SRB	Vujadin Savić (Loan return from Rad)
2	MF	BRA	Sávio (From (Montenegro) FK Zeta)
20	MF	BRA	Cadú (From (Montenegro) FK Zeta)
8	MF	SRB	Darko Lazović (From Borac Čačak)
7	MF	SRB	Nemanja Obrić (From (Hungary) Kaposvári Rákóczi FC)
3	DF	SRB	Nikola Ignjatijević (From FK Javor)
18	DF	SRB	Slavoljub Đorđević (From (Austria) SCR Altach)
9	FW	SRB	Dejan Lekić (From FK Zemun)
16	MF	SRB	Nenad Srećković (Loan return from Srem (SM))
15	DF	SRB	Milan Vilotić (From FK Čukarički)
19	DF	SRB	Nemanja Cvetković (From (Belgium) UR Namur)
21	DF	BIH	Nikola Vasiljević (From (Ukraine) Metalurh Zaporizhzhia)

Out: Note: Flags indicate national team as defined under FIFA eligibility rules; some limited exceptions apply. Players may hold more than one non-FIFA nationality.

No.	Pos.	Nation	Player
-	DF	SRB	Nino Pekarić (Loan return to (Romania) Dinamo Bucharest)
-	FW	BRA	Cleo (Loan return to (Portugal) C.D. Olivais e Moscavide, to Partizan)
-	MF	SVN	Mirnes Šišić (released)
-	DF	SRB	Ivan Gvozdenović (released, to FK Vojvodina)
-	MF	SRB	Ognjen Koroman (To (South Korea) Incheon United)
-	DF	POL	Grzegorz Bronowicki (released, To (Poland) Górnik Łęczna)
-	DF	SRB	Nemanja Pejčinović (Loan return to Rad, to Hertha Berlin)
-	FW	BRA	Josiesley Ferreira (released, to (Brazil) Náutico)
-	MF	SRB	Nenad Milijaš (To (England) Wolverhampton Wanderers)
-	DF	SRB	Nenad Tomović (To (Italy) Genoa)
-	FW	RSA	Bernard Parker (To (Netherlands) FC Twente, was on loan from (South Africa) Thanda Royal Zulu)
-	DF	BRA	Jeff Silva (Released)
-	MF	ECU	Segundo Castillo (To (England) Wolverhampton Wanderers, was on loan in (England) Everton FC)
-	MF	SRB	Nikola Trajković (released, was on loan in (Greece) Thrasyvoulos F.C.)
-	FW	COD	Ibrahim Some Salombo (To (Belgium) FCV Dender)
-	FW	MNE	Igor Burzanović (Loan return from (Montenegro) FK Budućnost Podgorica, to (Japan) Nagoya Grampus Eight)
-	FW	MKD	Ivan Tričkovski (On loan to (Cyprus) Enosis Paralimni)
-	FW	CMR	Aboubakar Oumarou (To OFK Belgrade)

=== FK Javor ===
In: Note: Flags indicate national team as defined under FIFA eligibility rules; some limited exceptions apply. Players may hold more than one non-FIFA nationality.

No.	Pos.	Nation	Player
1	GK	SRB	Igor Bondžulić (From (Bulgaria) Lokomotiv Sofia)
5	DF	SRB	Goran Gogić (From FK Napredak Kruševac)
22	MF	SRB	Bojan Čukić (free)
6	DF	SRB	Đuro Jandrić (From (North Macedonia) FK Pelister)
4	MF	SRB	Filip Stanisavljević (From Metalac (GM))
30	DF	SRB	Vladan Pavlović (From FK Vojvodina)
19	FW	SRB	Nenad Stojanović (From FK Vojvodina)
3	FW	NGA	Frank Egharevba (From (Austria) Admira Wacker)
11	FW	NGA	Ifeanyi Victor Onyilo (Loan return from FK Sloga Požega)
15	MF	SRB	Igor Stojaković (From (Montenegro) FK Mogren)
12	GK	SRB	Damir Kahriman (From Rad)
14	DF	URU	Miguel Lavié (Free, from (Brazil) Avaí)
24	MF	URU	Gerardo Vonder Putten (From (Uruguay) Central Español)
29	MF	SRB	Nenad Panić (From (Austria) SV Würmla)

Out: Note: Flags indicate national team as defined under FIFA eligibility rules; some limited exceptions apply. Players may hold more than one non-FIFA nationality.

No.	Pos.	Nation	Player
-	GK	BIH	Nemanja Supić (To (Cyprus) Anorthosis Famagusta)
-	DF	SRB	Nikola Ignjatijević (To Red Star Belgrade)
-	MF	NGA	Nnaemeka Ajuru (To FK Vojvodina)
-	DF	SRB	Miroslav Vulićević (To FK Vojvodina)
-	DF	SRB	Željko Đokić (To (Greece) Panthrakikos Komotini)
-	FW	SRB	Filip Arsenijević (To (Greece) Panthrakikos Komotini)
-	MF	SRB	Nikola Simić (To OFK Belgrade)
-	FW	SRB	Stevan Račić (To (South Korea) Daejeon Citizen F.C.)

=== Borac Čačak ===
In: Note: Flags indicate national team as defined under FIFA eligibility rules; some limited exceptions apply. Players may hold more than one non-FIFA nationality.

No.	Pos.	Nation	Player
11	MF	SRB	Zoran Kostić (From (Russia) Shinnik Yaroslavl)
-	FW	SRB	Stefan Joković (From FK Timok Zaječar)
-	FW	SRB	Lazar Konić (From FK Timok Zaječar)
22	MF	SRB	Milan Davidov (From FK Hajduk Kula)
23	DF	SRB	Boris Miličić (From (Hungary) Diósgyőri VTK)
3	FW	MNE	Ilija Spasojević (From (Georgia (country)) FC Dinamo Tbilisi)

Out: Note: Flags indicate national team as defined under FIFA eligibility rules; some limited exceptions apply. Players may hold more than one non-FIFA nationality.

No.	Pos.	Nation	Player
-	MF	SRB	Darko Lazović (To Red Star Belgrade)
-	DF	SRB	Aleksandar Ignjatović (On loan to (Netherlands) Feyenoord)
-	DF	SRB	Nenad Novaković (To (Bosnia and Herzegovina) Sloboda Tuzla)
-	MF	SRB	Vladimir Krnjinac (To FK Napredak Kruševac)
-	FW	BIH	Miloš Kuljanin (To (Bosnia and Herzegovina) FK Modriča)
-	FW	SRB	Nenad Kovačević (Loan return to FK Banat)
-	GK	SRB	Igor Stefanović (To FK Banat)
-	MF	SRB	Vladimir Radivojević (To Mladost Lučani)
-	DF	SRB	Mirko Poledica (To Mladost Lučani)
-	FW	SRB	Boban Stojanović (To (Greece) Panetolikos)

=== Napredak Kruševac ===
In: Note: Flags indicate national team as defined under FIFA eligibility rules; some limited exceptions apply. Players may hold more than one non-FIFA nationality.

No.	Pos.	Nation	Player
4	DF	MNE	Dejan Damjanović (From (Montenegro) FK Kom)
17	MF	MKD	Dragan Stojkov (From (Greece) Ilisiakos)
20	MF	BRA	Leandro Rodrigues (On loan from FK Vojvodina)
9	FW	GHA	Yaw Antwi (From (Ghana) Liberty Professionals F.C.)
18	MF	NGA	Ezeh Ikechukwu (From (Montenegro) FK Kom)
23	MF	SRB	Vladimir Krnjinac (From Borac Čačak)
-	DF	CMR	Jacques Bertin Nguemaleu (From (Cameroon) Union Douala)
-	MF	GHA	Akuffo Gershon Kwasi (From)
33	FW	PRK	Yong Lee-Ya (From (North Korea) )
16	DF	SRB	Radosav Aleksić (Loan return from FK Kopaonik)

Out: Note: Flags indicate national team as defined under FIFA eligibility rules; some limited exceptions apply. Players may hold more than one non-FIFA nationality.

No.	Pos.	Nation	Player
-	DF	SRB	Branislav Jovanović (To FK Partizan)
-	FW	SRB	Slavko Perović (Loan return to Red Star Belgrade)
-	DF	SRB	Goran Gogić (To FK Javor)
-	DF	SRB	Marko Đorđević (To FK Jagodina)
-	MF	SRB	Dušan Martinović (Loan return to FK Kolubara)
-	MF	BIH	Nemanja Đurović (Loan return to FK Kolubara)
-	MF	SRB	Srđan Novković (To FK Jagodina)
-	GK	SRB	Dalibor Milenković (To FK Kolubara)
-	MF	SRB	Bojan Stamenković (On loan to Dinamo Vranje)
-	MF	SRB	Milan Nikolić (To (Uzbekistan) Pakhtakor Tashkent)
-	DF	SRB	Miodrag Jovanović (To (North Macedonia) FK Pobeda)

=== Hajduk Kula ===
In: Note: Flags indicate national team as defined under FIFA eligibility rules; some limited exceptions apply. Players may hold more than one non-FIFA nationality.

No.	Pos.	Nation	Player
-	DF	SRB	Bojan Mladenović (From OFK Mladenovac)
1	GK	BUL	Angel Manolov (From (Bulgaria) PFC Belasitsa Petrich)
17	MF	MNE	Srđan Đukanović (From (Poland) Odra Opole)
24	DF	SRB	Vladimir Panjković (From Mladost Apatin)
-	DF	SRB	Damir Topčagić (Loan return from Mladost Apatin)
20	FW	SRB	Marko Jovanović (From (Romania) CFR Timişoara)

Out: Note: Flags indicate national team as defined under FIFA eligibility rules; some limited exceptions apply. Players may hold more than one non-FIFA nationality.

No.	Pos.	Nation	Player
-	GK	SRB	Anđelko Đuričić (To (Portugal) União Leiria)
-	MF	SRB	Milan Davidov (To Borac Čačak)
-	DF	MNE	Miloš Mrvaljević (To Mladost Apatin)
-	FW	CRO	Zoran Rajović (Released, to (Bosnia and Herzegovina) FK Olimpik Sarajevo)

=== Rad ===
In: Note: Flags indicate national team as defined under FIFA eligibility rules; some limited exceptions apply. Players may hold more than one non-FIFA nationality.

No.	Pos.	Nation	Player
-	MF	MNE	Darko Karadžić (Loan return from (Hungary) FC Fehervar)
-	FW	SRB	Stefan Đurović (From FK Novi Sad)
18	DF	MNE	Srđan Ajković (From (Montenegro) FK Zeta)
-	DF	SRB	Slobodan Vuković (From FK Voždovac)
-	GK	BIH	Igor Božić (Loan return from (North Macedonia) FK Pobeda)
14	FW	SRB	Nemanja Obradović (Loan return from (North Macedonia) FK Pobeda)
-	DF	SRB	Boris Živanović (From FK Zemun)
20	MF	SRB	Bratislav Ristić (From (Bulgaria) Slavia Sofia)
7	MF	SRB	Nenad Stojaković (From (Hungary) Budapest Honvéd)
15	DF	SRB	Tomislav Pajović (From Čukarički)
12	MF	SRB	Miroslav Petronijević (From Čukarički)
26	GK	CAN	Milan Borjan (From (Argentina) Quilmes)

Out: Note: Flags indicate national team as defined under FIFA eligibility rules; some limited exceptions apply. Players may hold more than one non-FIFA nationality.

No.	Pos.	Nation	Player
-	DF	SRB	Vujadin Savić (Loan return to Red Star Belgrade)
-	DF	SRB	Nemanja Pejčinović (Loan return from Red Star Belgrade, on loan to (Germany) Hertha BSC)
-	MF	SRB	Mirko Teodorović (To Metalac (GM))
-	MF	SRB	Slaviša Jeremić (To Metalac (GM))
-	DF	SRB	Radoš Protić (To (Bosnia and Herzegovina) FK Leotar)
-	GK	SRB	Damir Kahriman (To FK Javor)
-	DF	SRB	Jagoš Vuković (On loan to (Netherlands) PSV Eindhoven)

=== Čukarički ===
In: Note: Flags indicate national team as defined under FIFA eligibility rules; some limited exceptions apply. Players may hold more than one non-FIFA nationality.

No.	Pos.	Nation	Player
23	MF	SRB	Nikola Rnić (Free)
5	MF	SRB	Vladimir Ilić (From FK Voždovac)
-	FW	SRB	Nebojša Marinković (Loan return from (Spain) Gimnastic Tarragona)
6	DF	MNE	Ivan Kecojević (Loaned from FK Teleoptik)
10	MF	SRB	Mihailo Dobrašinović (Loan return from FK Smederevo)
17	FW	SRB	Vladimir Ribić (Free)
4	DF	SRB	Nebojša Joksimović (Free, was in (Switzerland) Neuchâtel Xamax)
12	MF	SRB	Sreten Stanić (From FK Banat)
15	MF	SRB	Dušan Kolarević (From Hajduk Beograd)
8	MF	SRB	Vladimir Tintor (From (Kazakhstan) FC Zhetysu)
25	DF	SRB	Mirko Bunjevčević (Free, from (Ukraine) FC Zorya Luhansk)
50	GK	SRB	Bojan Isailović (From (Turkey) Gençlerbirligi)
3	DF	SRB	Ivan Popović (On loan from (Romania) CF Liberty Salonta)
24	DF	SRB	Vladimir Jevđenijević (From OFK Mladenovac)
-	DF	SRB	Saša Blagojević (From FK Jagodina)
-	DF	SRB	Nikola Dragičević (From Srem (SM))
-	GK	SRB	Aleksandar Šarić (From (Slovakia) DAC Dunajská Streda)
-	DF	SRB	Miljan Anđelić (From FK Mladi Radnik)

Out: Note: Flags indicate national team as defined under FIFA eligibility rules; some limited exceptions apply. Players may hold more than one non-FIFA nationality.

No.	Pos.	Nation	Player
-	MF	SRB	Miloš Bosančić (Loan to (Czech Republic) Slovan Liberec)
-	MF	SRB	Albert Nađ (End of career)
-	GK	SRB	Milan Lukač (To (Greece) AEK Athens)
-	DF	SRB	Nenad Višnjić (To (Montenegro) FK Budućnost Podgorica)
-	DF	SRB	Dejan Perić (To FK Sloga Kraljevo)
-	DF	SRB	Marko Marović (To (Romania) CS Gaz Metan Mediaş)
-	FW	SRB	Milan Bojović (To FK Jagodina)
-	DF	SRB	Milan Vilotić (To Red Star Belgrade)
-	DF	SRB	Aleksandar Trninić (To (Bosnia and Herzegovina) FK Leotar)
-	DF	SRB	Goran Marković (To (Bosnia and Herzegovina) HŠK Zrinjski Mostar)
-	DF	SRB	Tomislav Pajović (To Rad)
-	FW	SRB	Lazar Popović (To (Bosnia and Herzegovina) FK Željezničar)
-	FW	UGA	Eugene Sseppuya (Released, to FK Mladi Radnik)
-	MF	SRB	Ivan Kaličanin (To FK Kolubara)
-	GK	SRB	Saša Mišić (To (Montenegro) FK Berane)
-	DF	SRB	Nebojša Savić (Released)
-	DF	SRB	Miroslav Petronijević (To Rad)

=== FK Jagodina ===
In: Note: Flags indicate national team as defined under FIFA eligibility rules; some limited exceptions apply. Players may hold more than one non-FIFA nationality.

No.	Pos.	Nation	Player
4	DF	SRB	Marko Đorđević (From FK Napredak Kruševac)
25	GK	SRB	Zlatko Zečević (From FK Banat)
7	DF	SRB	Miloš Živković (From (Ukraine) Tavriya Simferopol)
18	MF	SRB	Srđan Novković (From FK Napredak Kruševac)
10	FW	SRB	Milan Bojović (From FK Čukarički)
9	FW	SRB	Perica Ognjenović (free, was in (Greece) Kalithea)
6	MF	SRB	Saša Marjanović (Free)
24	DF	SRB	Boban Nikolić (From Dinamo Vranje)
15	DF	SRB	Saša Cilinšek (From (Latvia) FK Ventspils)
-	FW	SUI	Miloš Malenović (From (Netherlands) FC Omniworld)

Out: Note: Flags indicate national team as defined under FIFA eligibility rules; some limited exceptions apply. Players may hold more than one non-FIFA nationality.

No.	Pos.	Nation	Player
-	GK	SRB	Danilo Pustinjaković (To (North Macedonia) FK Makedonija GP)
-	FW	SRB	Igor Pavlović (To (Poland) Wisła Płock)
-	DF	SRB	Danijel Mihajlović (To (Turkey) Gençlerbirliği S.K.)
-	MF	SRB	Dragan Đurđević (To (Bosnia and Herzegovina) FK Olimpik Sarajevo)
-	MF	SRB	Vasilije Prodanović (To (Poland) Polonia Bytom)
-	MF	SRB	Dejan Radosavljević (To FK Novi Pazar)
-	FW	SRB	Miloš Stojanović (On loan to FK Novi Pazar)
-	DF	SRB	Dragiša Žunić (To Metalac (GM))
-	FW	MNE	Uroš Vemić (To Mladost Lučani)
-	FW	SRB	Aleksandar Stojković (On loan to Mladost Lučani)
-	DF	SRB	Bogdan Spalević (On loan to Mladost Lučani)
-	MF	GHA	Alfred Arthur (Released, to (Ghana) Ashanti Gold SC)
-	GK	SRB	Dobrica Filipović (To FK Šumadija)
-	DF	SRB	Aleksandar Trajković (To Radnički Niš)
-	DF	SRB	Bogdan Marjanović (To (Montenegro) FK Mornar)
-	DF	SRB	Borko Milenković (To (Montenegro) FK Mornar)
-	DF	SRB	Miloš Nikolić (On loan to Dinamo Vranje)
-	DF	SRB	Saša Blagojević (To Čukarički)
-	DF	SRB	Vukašin Tomić (To (Romania) Astra Ploieşti)
-	FW	NGA	Solomon Oladele (Loaned to FK Sinđelić Niš)

=== OFK Belgrade ===
In: Note: Flags indicate national team as defined under FIFA eligibility rules; some limited exceptions apply. Players may hold more than one non-FIFA nationality.

No.	Pos.	Nation	Player
27	GK	SRB	Đorđe Topalović (Free, from (Kazakhstan) FC Vostok)
21	MF	SRB	Aleksandar Marković (Youth academy)
23	MF	SRB	Darko Jovandić (Free)
23	DF	SRB	Danilo Nikolić (From (Albania) Dinamo Tirana)
26	DF	BRA	Roberto Carvalho Cauê (From (Brazil) Nacional Futebol Clube)
20	DF	SRB	Emir Lotinac (Loan return from FK Novi Pazar)
28	FW	SRB	Stefan Šćepović (Loan return from FK Mladi Radnik)
10	MF	SRB	Veseljko Trivunović (From FK Vojvodina)
22	MF	SRB	Nikola Simić (From FK Javor)
19	MF	SRB	Miloš Krstić (On loan from (France) Olympique Marseille)
14	FW	CMR	Aboubakar Oumarou (On loan from Red Star Belgrade)
30	DF	SRB	Nenad Lazarevski (Free)
15	DF	SRB	Petar Planić (From FK Metalac Kraljevo)

Out: Note: Flags indicate national team as defined under FIFA eligibility rules; some limited exceptions apply. Players may hold more than one non-FIFA nationality.

No.	Pos.	Nation	Player
-	FW	SRB	Aleksandar Jevtić (Loan return to (Turkey) Hacettepe Spor Kulübü, to Red Star Belgrade)
-	MF	SRB	Aleksandar Ignjovski (On loan to (Germany) TSV 1860 München)
-	FW	MNE	Sead Banda (To (Montenegro) FK Sutjeska)
-	DF	SRB	Vidak Bratić (To FK Spartak Subotica)
-	MF	BIH	Amer Osmanagić (On loan to (Bosnia and Herzegovina) FK Velež Mostar)
-	DF	SRB	Nenad Todorović (To (Hungary) Zalaegerszegi TE)
-	MF	SRB	Ajazdin Nuhi (To (Montenegro) FK Mogren)
-	FW	SRB	Rodoljub Marjanović (Loaned to FK Radnički Sombor)

=== FK Smederevo ===
In: Note: Flags indicate national team as defined under FIFA eligibility rules; some limited exceptions apply. Players may hold more than one non-FIFA nationality.

No.	Pos.	Nation	Player
21	FW	SRB	Saša Ranković (From FK Mladi Radnik)
-	MF	CAN	Bojan Kajgo (From FK Hajduk Beograd)
-	MF	MKD	Zoran Todorov (From FK Voždovac)
-	MF	SRB	Dejan Vukojević (From FK Voždovac)
20	MF	SRB	Ivan Jovanović (Free, from (North Macedonia) Vardar Skopje)
-	FW	SRB	Marko Milosavljević (From FK Sloga Petrovac na Mlavi)

Out: Note: Flags indicate national team as defined under FIFA eligibility rules; some limited exceptions apply. Players may hold more than one non-FIFA nationality.

No.	Pos.	Nation	Player
-	FW	MNE	Zoran Đurašković (To (Montenegro) OFK Petrovac)
-	DF	SRB	Vladimir Sandulović (To FK Sevojno)
-	MF	SRB	Milan Ćulum (To (Bosnia and Herzegovina) FK Željezničar)
-	MF	SRB	Mihailo Dobrašinović (Loan return to Čukarički)
-	MF	SRB	Radojica Vasić (To Metalac (GM))

=== BSK Borča ===
In: Note: Flags indicate national team as defined under FIFA eligibility rules; some limited exceptions apply. Players may hold more than one non-FIFA nationality.

No.	Pos.	Nation	Player
28	DF	SRB	Ivan Vukadinović (From FK Voždovac)
22	FW	SRB	Aleksandar Đukić (From FK Banat)
2	DF	SRB	Goran Antelj (Free, from (Poland) Warta Poznań)
17	MF	SUI	Nikola Nikolić (from (Croatia) NK Imotski)

Out: Note: Flags indicate national team as defined under FIFA eligibility rules; some limited exceptions apply. Players may hold more than one non-FIFA nationality.

No.	Pos.	Nation	Player
-	FW	SRB	Milan Nikolić (To (Poland) Polonia Warszawa)
-	DF	SRB	Jovica Jokić (To (Bosnia and Herzegovina) FK Laktaši)

=== FK Mladi Radnik ===
In: Note: Flags indicate national team as defined under FIFA eligibility rules; some limited exceptions apply. Players may hold more than one non-FIFA nationality.

No.	Pos.	Nation	Player
-	FW	SRB	Bojan Spasojević (From (North Macedonia) FK Metalurg Skopje)
11	MF	SRB	Miroslav Savanović (From FK Kolubara)
30	MF	SRB	Dejan Ristić (From Dinamo Vranje)
24	MF	NGA	Franklin Ayodele (From FK Loznica)
14	MF	SRB	Nenad Nedeljković (From Mladost Lučani)
19	DF	SRB	Bojan Simić (From (Moldova) Zimbru Chişinău)
21	FW	SRB	Milan Perić (On loan from FK Partizan)
23	FW	UGA	Eugene Sseppuya (Free, from Čukarički)

Out: Note: Flags indicate national team as defined under FIFA eligibility rules; some limited exceptions apply. Players may hold more than one non-FIFA nationality.

No.	Pos.	Nation	Player
-	FW	SRB	Saša Ranković (To FK Smederevo)
-	FW	SRB	Saša Mitić (To FK Sloga Kraljevo)
-	FW	SRB	Stefan Šćepović (Loan return to OFK Belgrade)
-	DF	SRB	Miljan Anđelić (To Čukarički)
-	DF	SRB	Boban Petrović (To Radnički Niš)
-	FW	SRB	Igor Radisavljević (To FK Mačva Šabac)
-	MF	SRB	Goran Lepojević (Released)
-	FW	SRB	Aleksandar Lazarević (Released)
-	DF	SRB	Ivan Kojić (Released)

=== Spartak Subotica ===
In: Note: Flags indicate national team as defined under FIFA eligibility rules; some limited exceptions apply. Players may hold more than one non-FIFA nationality.

No.	Pos.	Nation	Player
1	GK	SRB	Milan Jovanić (From FK Novi Sad)
2	DF	SRB	Darko Puškarić (From FK Novi Sad)
10	FW	SRB	Asmir Misini (From ČSK Čelarevo)
6	DF	SRB	Vidak Bratić (From OFK Beograd)
23	MF	SRB	Lazar Veselinović (From FK Inđija)
21	FW	SRB	Marko Mirić (From Metalac (GM))
24	DF	SRB	Zoran Pešić (From FK Novi Sad)
4	MF	SRB	Slobodan Simović (From FK Novi Sad)
25	GK	SRB	Miloš Milinović (From ČSK Čelarevo)

Out: Note: Flags indicate national team as defined under FIFA eligibility rules; some limited exceptions apply. Players may hold more than one non-FIFA nationality.

No.	Pos.	Nation	Player
-	MF	SRB	Saša Vojnić-Zelić (To (Hungary) Kozármisleny SE)
-	MF	SRB	Zvezdan Lazić (To (Bosnia and Herzegovina) FK Leotar)
-	MF	BRA	Fabinho (To (Hungary) Kozármisleny SE)
-	MF	SRB	Uroš Glogovac (To FK Proleter Novi Sad)
-	MF	SRB	Goran Marinković (To FK Sloga Kraljevo)
-	MF	SRB	Damir Opačić (To ČSK Čelarevo)
-	DF	SRB	Borislav Pavlović (To ČSK Čelarevo)
-	MF	SRB	Aleksandar Jovetić (On loan to FK Palić)
-	DF	SRB	Slobodan Marković (To (Hungary) Kaposvári Rákóczi FC)

=== Metalac Gornji Milanovac ===
In: Note: Flags indicate national team as defined under FIFA eligibility rules; some limited exceptions apply. Players may hold more than one non-FIFA nationality.

No.	Pos.	Nation	Player
19	DF	SRB	Dragiša Žunić (From FK Jagodina)
20	DF	SRB	Zoran Zukić (From FK Mladost Bački Jarak)
4	MF	SRB	Radojica Vasić (From FK Smederevo)
14	FW	CHA	Misdongard Betoligar (From (Montenegro) FK Budućnost Podgorica)
24	MF	SRB	Mirko Teodorović (From Rad)
15	MF	SRB	Slaviša Jeremić (From Rad)
22	MF	SRB	Miloš Obradović (From Mladost Lučani)
23	FW	SRB	Vladimir Savićević (From Srem (SM))

Out: Note: Flags indicate national team as defined under FIFA eligibility rules; some limited exceptions apply. Players may hold more than one non-FIFA nationality.

No.	Pos.	Nation	Player
-	DF	SRB	Petar Pavlović (To (Malta) Birkirkara FC)
-	DF	SRB	Đorđe Tadić (To (North Macedonia) FK Metalurg Skopje)
-	MF	SRB	Filip Stanisavljević (To FK Javor)
-	FW	SRB	Ljubo Nenadić (To (Bosnia and Herzegovina) FK Olimpik Sarajevo)
-	FW	SRB	Marko Mirić (To Spartak Subotica)
-	MF	SRB	Nikola Tasić (On loan to Mladost Lučani)
-	MF	SRB	Ljubomir Arsić (On loan to Radnički Kragujevac)
-	DF	SRB	Budimir Đukić (To Radnički Kragujevac)
-	DF	SRB	Darko Stanojević (Released)
-	MF	SRB	Predrag Đorović (Released)

== See also ==
- Serbian Superliga
- Serbian Superliga 2009-10
- List of foreign football players in Serbia
