= List of Serbian football transfers summer 2010 =

This is a list of transfers in Serbian football for the 2010 summer transfer window. Only moves featuring a Serbian Superliga side are listed.

- If adding transfers, please add the external source in references list, at bottom.

== Serbian Superliga ==
=== Partizan ===
In: Note: Flags indicate national team as defined under FIFA eligibility rules; some limited exceptions apply. Players may hold more than one non-FIFA nationality.

| No. | Pos. | Nation | Player |
|---|---|---|---|
| 19 | FW | SRB | Miloš Bogunović (loan return from (Spain) Cádiz CF) |
| 2 | DF | SRB | Aleksandar Miljković (loan return from Metalac G.M.) |
| 12 | GK | SRB | Živko Živković (loan return from Metalac G.M.) |
| 3 | DF | SRB | Ivan Stevanović (on loan from (France) Sochaux) |
| 33 | GK | SRB | Radiša Ilić (from Borac Čačak) |
| 27 | DF | UGA | Joseph Kizito (from FK Vojvodina) |
| 77 | FW | SRB | Ivica Iliev (from (Israel) Maccabi Tel Aviv) |
| 99 | MF | SRB | Milan Smiljanić (on loan from (Spain) RCD Espanyol) |
| 31 | FW | SRB | Marko Šćepović (from FK Teleoptik) |
| 24 | DF | SRB | Matija Nastasić (from FK Teleoptik) |
| 25 | MF | SRB | Stefan Babović (from (France) FC Nantes, previously on loan at (Netherlands) Feyenoord) |
| 4 | MF | SLE | Medo Kamara (from (Finland) HJK Helsinki) |
| 88 | GK | SRB | Vladimir Stojković (on loan from (Portugal) Sporting CP) |
| 15 | DF | MNE | Stefan Savić (from BSK Borča) |
| 11 | FW | CMR | Pierre Boya (from (France) Grenoble Foot 38) |

Out: Note: Flags indicate national team as defined under FIFA eligibility rules; some limited exceptions apply. Players may hold more than one non-FIFA nationality.

| No. | Pos. | Nation | Player |
|---|---|---|---|
| — | MF | MNE | Nikola Vujović (to (Montenegro) Mogren, was playing with reserve team) |
| 24 | DF | SRB | Srđa Knežević (to (Poland) Legia Warszawa) |
| 1 | GK | MNE | Darko Božović (released, later signed for Sloboda Sevojno) |
| 27 | GK | MNE | Mladen Božović (to (Hungary) Videoton) |
| — | MF | SLO | Danijel Marčeta (to (Slovenia) Koper, previously on loan at (Scotland) Falkirk) |
| 26 | FW | SEN | Lamine Diarra (on loan to (Saudi Arabia) Al-Shabab Dubai) |
| 19 | FW | SRB | Brana Ilić (to FK Vojvodina) |
| 11 | DF | SRB | Marko Lomić (to (Russia) Dynamo Moscow) |
| — | DF | SRB | Siniša Stevanović (was on loan, now transfer to Spartak ZV Subotica) |
| 6 | DF | SRB | Radenko Kamberović (on loan to Borac Čačak) |
| 25 | FW | BRA | Washington (on loan to Borac Čačak) |
| 21 | MF | SRB | Branislav Jovanović (to Rad) |
| 1 | GK | SRB | Aleksandar Radosavljević (to (Hungary) Győri ETO) |

=== Red Star Belgrade ===
In: Note: Flags indicate national team as defined under FIFA eligibility rules; some limited exceptions apply. Players may hold more than one non-FIFA nationality.

| No. | Pos. | Nation | Player |
|---|---|---|---|
| 17 | MF | SRB | Vladan Binić (From Napredak Kruševac) |
| 29 | MF | MNE | Marko Vešović (From (Montenegro) Budućnost Podgorica) |
| 5 | DF | SRB | Bojan Đorđević (From FK Novi Pazar) |
| 9 | MF | SRB | Ognjen Koroman (From (South Korea) Incheon United) |
| 3 | DF | SRB | Duško Tošić (From (England) Portsmouth) |
| 88 | MF | SRB | Dejan Milovanović (On loan from (France) RC Lens) |
| 99 | FW | SRB | Andrija Kaluđerović (From Rad) |
| 25 | DF | SRB | Danijel Mihajlović (From FK Jagodina) |
| 13 | DF | GHA | Lee Addy (From (Ghana) Bechem Chelsea) |

Out: Note: Flags indicate national team as defined under FIFA eligibility rules; some limited exceptions apply. Players may hold more than one non-FIFA nationality.

| No. | Pos. | Nation | Player |
|---|---|---|---|
| 12 | GK | SRB | Saša Radivojević (Was on loan now signed with Čukarički) |
| 17 | MF | SRB | Nikola Lazetić (To FK Vojvodina) |
| 9 | FW | SRB | Dejan Lekić (To (Spain) CA Osasuna) |
| — | FW | MKD | Ivan Tričkovski (To (Cyprus) APOEL Nicosia, was on loan at (Cyprus) Enosis Neon Paralimni) |
| 4 | DF | BIH | Ognjen Vranješ (On loan to (Moldova) Sheriff Tiraspol, was on loan at Napredak Kruševac) |
| — | MF | ECU | Segundo Castillo (To (Ecuador) Deportivo Quito, was on loan at (England) Wolverhampton Wanderers) |
| 28 | DF | SRB | Vujadin Savić (To (France) Bordeaux) |
| 29 | FW | SRB | Miloš Reljić (On loan to BSK Borča) |
| 10 | MF | MNE | Marko Mugoša (On loan to (Montenegro) Budućnost Podgorica) |
| 7 | MF | SRB | Nemanja Obrić (To (Hungary) Szombathelyi Haladás) |
| 16 | MF | SRB | Nenad Srećković (On loan to Napredak Kruševac, was on loan at Mladi Radnik) |
| 30 | MF | MNE | Nemanja Nikolić (On loan to Spartak Subotica) |
| 19 | FW | AZE | Branimir Subašić (To (Azerbaijan) Gabala FC) |

=== OFK Beograd ===
In: Note: Flags indicate national team as defined under FIFA eligibility rules; some limited exceptions apply. Players may hold more than one non-FIFA nationality.

| No. | Pos. | Nation | Player |
|---|---|---|---|
| 31 | GK | SRB | Nikola Matek (Loan return from Srem Jakovo) |
| — | DF | SRB | Filip Pjević (Loan return from Mladost Apatin) |
| 7 | MF | SRB | Miloš Filipović (Loan return from Mladost Apatin) |
| 5 | DF | MNE | Ivan Kecojević (From FK Teleoptik, previously on loan with Čukarički) |
| 3 | FW | MNE | Luka Merdović (From (Montenegro) Sutjeska Nikšić) |
| 36 | MF | SRB | Jovan Radivojević (From Rad) |
| 17 | DF | SRB | Igor Popović (From (Romania) FC Timișoara) |
| — | MF | SRB | Igor Jelić (Loan return from Mladost Apatin) |
| 19 | FW | HUN | Tamás Takács (From (Hungary) Kozármisleny SE) |
| 6 | DF | SRB | Novica Milenović (Loan return from Radnički Sombor) |
| — | MF | SRB | Igor Mišan (Loan return from Radnički Sombor) |

Out: Note: Flags indicate national team as defined under FIFA eligibility rules; some limited exceptions apply. Players may hold more than one non-FIFA nationality.

| No. | Pos. | Nation | Player |
|---|---|---|---|
| 5 | DF | SRB | Branko Lazarević (To (France) SM Caen) |
| 6 | DF | MNE | Miloš Mrvaljević (On loan to FK Bežanija, was on loan at Mladost Apatin) |
| — | MF | BIH | Amer Osmanagić (On loan to (Poland) Zagłębie Lubin, was on loan at (Bosnia and Herzegovina) Velež Mostar) |
| 9 | FW | BIH | Petar Jelić (To (Russia) Volga N.Novgorod) |
| 14 | FW | CMR | Aboubakar Oumarou (To FK Vojvodina) |
| — | FW | SRB | Stefan Šćepović (To (Belgium) Club Brugge, was on loan at (Italy) Sampdoria) |
| 7 | MF | SRB | Nikola Beljić (To (Greece) Panserraikos) |
| 4 | DF | SRB | Nenad Lazarevski (On loan to Radnički Sombor) |
| — | GK | MNE | Andrija Dragojević (On loan to Dinamo Vranje) |
| 26 | DF | BRA | Roberto Carvalho Cauê (To (Bosnia and Herzegovina) FK Drina Zvornik) |
| 23 | DF | SRB | Darko Jovandić (To FK Banat) |
| 17 | DF | SRB | Zoran Milovac (To FK Novi Sad, was on loan at FK Inđija) |
| — | MF | SRB | Andrej Mrkela (Loan return to Red Star Belgrade) |
| — | DF | SRB | Nebojša Skopljak (On loan to (Montenegro) FK Grbalj, was on loan at FK Novi Pazar) |
| — | MF | BIH | Igor Mišan (On loan to Radnički Sombor) |
| 32 | FW | SRB | Mladen Popović (Loan return to Vujić Voda Valjevo) |

=== Spartak ZV Subotica ===
In: Note: Flags indicate national team as defined under FIFA eligibility rules; some limited exceptions apply. Players may hold more than one non-FIFA nationality.

| No. | Pos. | Nation | Player |
|---|---|---|---|
| 2 | DF | SRB | Siniša Stevanović (from Partizan) |
| 1 | GK | SRB | Nemanja Jorgić (from FK Palić) |
| 25 | GK | SRB | Goran Labus (from ČSK Čelarevo) |
| 17 | DF | SRB | Goran Antonić (loan return from FK Palić) |
| 16 | MF | CHN | Cheng Mouyi (from (China) Hangzhou Greentown) |
| 10 | MF | SRB | Aleksandar Avrić (from FK Novi Sad) |
| 18 | DF | SRB | Nemanja Crnoglavac (from FK Zemun) |
| 15 | MF | MNE | Nemanja Nikolić (on loan from Red Star Belgrade) |
| 19 | DF | SRB | Miloš Bokić (from FK Voždovac) |

Out: Note: Flags indicate national team as defined under FIFA eligibility rules; some limited exceptions apply. Players may hold more than one non-FIFA nationality.

| No. | Pos. | Nation | Player |
|---|---|---|---|
| 20 | DF | SRB | Igor Popović (to (Romania) FC Timişoara) |
| 1 | GK | SRB | Milan Jovanić (to (Poland) Wisla Krakow) |
| 15 | MF | NGR | Emmanuel Oletu (on loan to (Portugal) CD Nacional) |
| — | FW | SRB | Lazar Veselinović (on loan to Proleter Novi Sad, was on loan at ČSK Čelarevo) |
| — | DF | SRB | Marko Veselinović (loan return to Radnički Sombor) |
| — | DF | SRB | Zoran Pešić (to FK Banat) |
| — | DF | SRB | Aleksandar Jovetić (on loan to FK Bačka 1901) |
| — | MF | SRB | Stefan Bosnić (on loan to Tekstilac Ites, was on loan at FK Bačka 1901) |
| — | GK | SRB | Radosav Roganović (on loan to Obilić N.Kneževac) |
| 10 | FW | SRB | Asmir Misini (to FK Novi Pazar) |

=== FK Vojvodina ===
In: Note: Flags indicate national team as defined under FIFA eligibility rules; some limited exceptions apply. Players may hold more than one non-FIFA nationality.

| No. | Pos. | Nation | Player |
|---|---|---|---|
| 16 | DF | BIH | Miroslav Stevanović (Loan return from (Bosnia and Herzegovina) FK Borac Banja Luka) |
| 15 | DF | MNE | Milko Novaković (From (Hungary) Videoton FC) |
| 20 | DF | SRB | Milovan Milović (From Javor Ivanjica) |
| 31 | DF | SRB | Vladan Pavlović (Loan return from Javor Ivanjica) |
| 18 | FW | GHA | Yaw Antwi (From Napredak Kruševac) |
| 14 | FW | CMR | Aboubakar Oumarou (From OFK Beograd) |
| 9 | FW | SRB | Brana Ilić (From Partizan) |
| 5 | DF | MKD | Daniel Mojsov (Signed last winter, due to transfer problems spent previous half-season at (North Macedonia) Vardar Skopje) |
| 23 | DF | SRB | Dušan Nestorović (Loan return from (Bosnia and Herzegovina) Slavija Sarajevo) |
| 6 | DF | SRB | Branislav Trajković (From Hajduk Kula) |
| 11 | MF | SRB | Nikola Lazetić (From Red Star Belgrade) |
| 19 | FW | SRB | Ognjen Mudrinski (Loan return from Hajduk Kula) |

Out: Note: Flags indicate national team as defined under FIFA eligibility rules; some limited exceptions apply. Players may hold more than one non-FIFA nationality.

| No. | Pos. | Nation | Player |
|---|---|---|---|
| 20 | FW | GHA | Sadick Adams (To (Tunisia) Étoile du Sahel) |
| 2 | DF | UGA | Joseph Kizito (To Partizan) |
| 5 | DF | MNE | Duško Đurišić (Released) |
| 8 | MF | ROU | Alin Stoica (To (Romania) Unirea Urziceni) |
| 25 | DF | BRA | Marcelo Pletsch (Retired) |
| 9 | FW | GEO | Mikheil Khutsishvili (Retired) |
| 31 | MF | SRB | Dušan Tadić (To (Netherlands) FC Groningen) |
| — | MF | BRA | Leandro (To (Singapore) Young Lions, was on loan at Napredak Kruševac) |
| 28 | DF | MNE | Risto Lakić (Released) |
| — | DF | SRB | Darko Lovrić (To (Israel) Hapoel Kfar Saba, was on loan at (Armenia) Banants) |
| — | GK | SRB | Darko Ristić (On loan to Cement Beočin, was on loan at FK Veternik) |
| — | MF | SRB | Siniša Babić (On loan to FK Veternik, was on loan at FK Palić) |
| 15 | DF | MNE | Stefan Zogović (On loan to FK Palić, was on short term loan at (Bosnia and Herzegovina) Slavija Sarajevo) |
| 18 | FW | SRB | Đorđe Šušnjar (On loan to Donji Srem Pećinci) |
| — | MF | SRB | Damir Zeljko (On loan to FK Veternik, was on loan at Radnički Sombor) |
| — | DF | SRB | Srđan Bečelić (On loan to FK Veternik) |
| — | DF | SRB | Danijel Faber (On loan to FK Veternik) |
| 32 | GK | SRB | Nikola Perić (On loan to FK Veternik) |
| — | DF | SRB | Dejan Dejanović (On loan to FK Veternik) |
| — | MF | SRB | Danilo Sekulić (Loan extension to Proleter Novi Sad) |
| 34 | GK | SRB | Damir Drinić (On loan to FK Veternik, was on loan at Proleter Novi Sad) |
| 26 | DF | SRB | Vladimir Kovačević (On loan to Hajduk Kula) |
| 7 | MF | SRB | Slobodan Novaković (On loan to Hajduk Kula) |
| — | DF | AUS | Aleksandar Jovanović (Loan extension to FK Novi Sad) |
| 81 | FW | SRB | Dragan Mrđa (To (Switzerland) FC Sion) |
| — | FW | SRB | Aleksa Mijailović (On loan to FK Veternik) |
| — | FW | SRB | Aleksandar Grković (On loan to Cement Beočin) |
| — | MF | SRB | Marko Stančetić (On loan to Cement Beočin) |
| 11 | FW | MNE | Slaven Stjepanović (To (Greece) A.O. Trikala) |
| — | DF | SRB | Aleksandar Tanasin (On loan to Cement Beočin) |
| — | MF | SRB | Dejan Erak (On loan to Sloga Radnički Erdevik) |
| — | FW | SRB | Rafailo Miščević (On loan to Sloga Radnički Erdevik) |

=== FK Jagodina ===
In: Note: Flags indicate national team as defined under FIFA eligibility rules; some limited exceptions apply. Players may hold more than one non-FIFA nationality.

| No. | Pos. | Nation | Player |
|---|---|---|---|
| — | FW | SRB | Stevan Vasić (Loan return from Radnički Svilajnac) |
| 13 | MF | SRB | Aleksandar Stojković (Loan return from Radnički Sombor) |
| 3 | DF | SRB | Radoš Protić (From Mačva Šabac) |
| 20 | DF | SRB | Marko Popović (From (Israel) FC Ashdod) |
| 11 | GK | SRB | Igor Bondžulić (From Javor Ivanjica) |
| 8 | DF | SRB | Miloš Živković (From FK Novi Pazar) |
| 26 | DF | MNE | Vladimir Ilić (From Javor Ivanjica) |
| 24 | FW | SRB | Dejan Đenić (From FK Bežanija) |
| 25 | DF | SRB | Marko Simić (From FK Bežanija) |
| 12 | GK | CRO | Marko Šimić (From (Croatia) NK ZET 1927) |

Out: Note: Flags indicate national team as defined under FIFA eligibility rules; some limited exceptions apply. Players may hold more than one non-FIFA nationality.

| No. | Pos. | Nation | Player |
|---|---|---|---|
| 11 | FW | SRB | Vladan Spasojević (To (Slovakia) MFK Košice) |
| 15 | DF | SRB | Saša Cilinšek (To (France) Évian FC) |
| 12 | GK | SRB | Danijel Milanović (On loan to Sloga Despotovac) |
| 32 | MF | SRB | Dušan Ivanov (On loan to Radnički Sombor) |
| 25 | GK | SRB | Zlatko Zečević (To (Cyprus) APOP Kinyras) |
| 24 | DF | SRB | Boban Nikolić (To (Romania) FCM Târgu Mureş) |
| 2 | DF | SRB | Aleksandar Simčević (To (Russia) Mordovia Saransk) |
| — | MF | SRB | Dejan Radosavljević (To Napredak Kruševac, previously on loan at Radnički Niš) |
| — | DF | SRB | Boris Miletić (On loan to FK Vujić Voda, both this summer) |
| 5 | DF | SRB | Danijel Mihajlović (To Red Star Belgrade) |
| — | MF | SRB | Marko Avramović (On loan to Mladost Lučani, previously on loan at Banat Zrenjanin) |
| — | GK | SRB | Zoran Vasković (To Napredak Kruševac, previously on loan at Radnički Niš) |
| — | DF | SRB | Vukašin Tomić (Was on loan, now permanently moved to Mladost Lučani) |
| — | DF | SRB | Bogdan Spalević (Released, previously on loan at Mladost Lučani) |
| — | MF | NGR | Solomon Oladele (Released, previously on loan at Sinđelić Niš) |
| — | DF | SRB | Vladan Marjanović (Released, previously on loan at Jedinstvo Paraćin) |
| — | DF | SRB | Srđan Lukić (Released) |

=== Javor Ivanjica ===
In: Note: Flags indicate national team as defined under FIFA eligibility rules; some limited exceptions apply. Players may hold more than one non-FIFA nationality.

| No. | Pos. | Nation | Player |
|---|---|---|---|
| 30 | DF | SRB | Nikola Prebiračević (From Mladi Radnik) |
| 14 | FW | NGR | Obiora Odita (From (Belgium) Westerlo) |
| 19 | DF | SRB | Bojan Mališić (From Rad) |
| 20 | FW | SUI | Stefan Todorović (From (Switzerland) Concordia Basel) |
| 12 | GK | SRB | Srđan Soldatović (Loan return from Sloga Požega) |
| 31 | DF | SRB | Igor Mitić (From (Bosnia and Herzegovina) Seljak Vidoši) |
| 7 | DF | SRB | Zoran Rendulić (From (France) Grenoble Foot 38) |
| 25 | DF | SRB | Željko Đokić (From (Greece) Panthrakikos) |
| 16 | MF | NGR | Hypolite Oguegbu (From (Nigeria) Anambra Pillars) |
| 3 | DF | SRB | Ivan Josović (From Radnički Kragujevac, was on loan at Big Bull Bačinci) |

Out: Note: Flags indicate national team as defined under FIFA eligibility rules; some limited exceptions apply. Players may hold more than one non-FIFA nationality.

| No. | Pos. | Nation | Player |
|---|---|---|---|
| 14 | DF | URU | Miguel Lavié (To (Brazil) Rio Claro FC) |
| 9 | FW | SRB | Stevan Račić (To (Ukraine) Volyn Lutsk) |
| 20 | DF | SRB | Milovan Milović (To FK Vojvodina) |
| 30 | DF | SRB | Vladan Pavlović (Loan return to FK Vojvodina) |
| 1 | GK | SRB | Igor Bondžulić (To FK Jagodina) |
| 23 | GK | SRB | Vladan Đogatović (To Radnički Kragujevac) |
| 7 | MF | SRB | Ivan Cvetković (To (Kazakhstan) FC Zhetysu) |
| 26 | DF | MNE | Vladimir Ilić (To FK Jagodina) |
| 2 | MF | SRB | Bojan Čukić (To (Slovakia) MFK Košice, was on loan at (Bosnia and Herzegovina) Borac Banja Luka) |
| — | FW | SRB | Nenad Stojanović (To (Bosnia and Herzegovina) FK Leotar) |
| 9 | FW | SRB | Goran Maričić (To Big Bull Radnički) |
| 6 | DF | SRB | Boris Miličić (On loan to FK Inđija) |
| — | MF | SRB | Filip Stojanović (Loan extension to Čukarički) |
| — | MF | SRB | Jovan Nikitović (Released) |

=== Rad ===
In: Note: Flags indicate national team as defined under FIFA eligibility rules; some limited exceptions apply. Players may hold more than one non-FIFA nationality.

| No. | Pos. | Nation | Player |
|---|---|---|---|
| 30 | MF | SRB | Nikola Leković (From FK Bežanija) |
| 20 | MF | SRB | Predrag Luka (From Mladi Radnik) |
| 25 | DF | SRB | Milan Mitrović (From FK Zemun) |
| 16 | MF | SRB | Jevrem Kosnić (From (Italy) Internazionale (youth)) |
| 29 | FW | SRB | Filip Malbašić (From Radnički N.Beograd) |
| 2 | DF | SRB | Aleksandar Pantić (From (Greece) OFI) |
| 8 | MF | SRB | Branislav Jovanović (From Partizan) |

Out: Note: Flags indicate national team as defined under FIFA eligibility rules; some limited exceptions apply. Players may hold more than one non-FIFA nationality.

| No. | Pos. | Nation | Player |
|---|---|---|---|
| — | DF | SRB | Jagoš Vuković (Was on loan, now signed with (Netherlands) PSV Eindhoven) |
| 20 | MF | SRB | Bratislav Ristić (To (United States) Chicago Fire) |
| 36 | MF | SRB | Jovan Radivojević (To OFK Beograd) |
| — | DF | SRB | Nemanja Pejčinović (Loan to (France) OGC Nice, had been on loan at (Germany) Hertha BSC) |
| 2 | DF | SRB | Bojan Mališić (To FK Javor) |
| 24 | MF | CHN | Li Chunyu (To (South Korea) Gangwon FC) |
| — | FW | SRB | Nemanja Obradović (To (Bosnia and Herzegovina) Drina Zvornik) |
| 9 | FW | SRB | Andrija Kaluđerović (To Red Star Belgrade) |
| — | GK | BIH | Igor Božić (Released) |
| — | MF | SRB | Boris Živanović (On loan to Radnički Kragujevac, previously on loan at Mačva Šabac) |
| — | MF | SRB | Miroslav Petronijević (To Napredak Kruševac, previously on loan at Čukarički) |
| — | DF | BIH | Saša Vidović (To FK Zemun) |
| — | DF | BIH | Boris Savić (Released, later signed for (Bosnia and Herzegovina) Olimpik Sarajevo) |
| — | FW | SRB | Milan Jovanović (Released) |

=== Metalac G.M. ===
In: Note: Flags indicate national team as defined under FIFA eligibility rules; some limited exceptions apply. Players may hold more than one non-FIFA nationality.

| No. | Pos. | Nation | Player |
|---|---|---|---|
| 1 | GK | SRB | Dejan Bogunović (From FK Banat) |
| 4 | DF | SRB | Nikola Lukić (From FK Zemun) |
| 7 | DF | SRB | Nenad Adamović (From FK Teleoptik) |
| 10 | DF | SRB | Rajko Brežančić (On loan from Partizan, was on loan at FK Teleoptik) |
| 12 | GK | SRB | Saša Mišić (From (Montenegro) FK Berane) |
| 15 | MF | SRB | Miloš Nikolić (From Srem S.Mitrovica) |
| 20 | MF | SRB | Vladimir Krnjinac (From Napredak Kruševac) |
| 17 | MF | SRB | Ivan Paunović (From (Romania) Universitatea Craiova) |
| 19 | MF | SRB | Nebojša Stanojlović (From FK Novi Pazar) |
| 24 | MF | SRB | Milan Svojić (From FK Mladi Radnik) |
| 16 | DF | SRB | Branislav Bajić (From (Greece) Ionikos) |

Out: Note: Flags indicate national team as defined under FIFA eligibility rules; some limited exceptions apply. Players may hold more than one non-FIFA nationality.

| No. | Pos. | Nation | Player |
|---|---|---|---|
| 15 | DF | SRB | Aleksandar Miljković (Loan return to Partizan) |
| 1 | GK | SRB | Živko Živković (Loan return to Partizan) |
| 19 | MF | SRB | Aleksandar R. Petrović (Loan return to Radnički Obrenovac, next to Hajduk Kula) |
| 22 | MF | SRB | Bojan Pavlović (Loan return to Čukarički, next to (Hungary) RFC Kaposvár) |
| 24 | DF | SRB | Dragan Dragutinović (To (Kazakhstan) FC Okzhetpes) |
| 10 | FW | SRB | Milan Perić (To (Hungary) RFC Kaposvár) |
| — | MF | SRB | Zoran Zukić (Was on loan, now signed with Proleter Novi Sad) |
| — | MF | SRB | Ljubomir Arsić (To FK Mladi Radnik) |
| 23 | GK | MNE | Branko Vujović (To FK Bežanija) |
| 23 | GK | MNE | Ivan Vujović (To Partizan Bumbarevo Brdo) |
| — | DF | SRB | Nemanja Ilić (To Čukarički, previously on loan at FK Smederevo) |
| — | MF | SRB | Radojica Vasić (To Mladost Lučani) |
| — | FW | SRB | Saša Jovanović (Released) |
| — | DF | SRB | Vladimir Đurđević (Released, previously on loan at Sinđelić Niš) |
| — | DF | SRB | Vladan Pavlović (To FK Radnički 1923, previously on loan at Mladost Lučani) |

=== FK Smederevo ===
In: Note: Flags indicate national team as defined under FIFA eligibility rules; some limited exceptions apply. Players may hold more than one non-FIFA nationality.

| No. | Pos. | Nation | Player |
|---|---|---|---|
| 1 | GK | SRB | Mladen Živković (From Sloga Petrovac) |
| 2 | DF | SRB | Ivan Milosavljević (From Seljak Mihajlovac) |
| 20 | MF | SRB | Peđa Jerinić (From FK Teleoptik) |
| 30 | FW | SRB | Nikola Lekić (From FK Teleoptik) |
| 17 | MF | SRB | Branislav Stanić (From FK Teleoptik, previously on loan with Hajduk Kula) |
| 15 | DF | SRB | Dušan Brković (From FK Teleoptik, previously on loan with Hajduk Kula) |
| 10 | MF | SRB | Nenad Marinković (From FK Teleoptik) |
| 7 | FW | SRB | Dragan Ćeran (Loan return from (Belgium) Westerlo) |
| 21 | FW | BIH | Ivan Vilaret (From FAP Priboj) |

Out: Note: Flags indicate national team as defined under FIFA eligibility rules; some limited exceptions apply. Players may hold more than one non-FIFA nationality.

| No. | Pos. | Nation | Player |
|---|---|---|---|
| 20 | MF | SRB | Ivan Jovanović (To (Cyprus) AEP Paphos) |
| 2 | DF | SRB | Nemanja Ilić (Loan return to Metalac G.M.) |
| 3 | DF | SRB | Miroslav Gegić (To (Kazakhstan) FC Okzhetpes) |
| 30 | MF | SRB | Filip Pejić (Released) |
| 17 | MF | SRB | Slobodan Janković (Released) |
| 7 | MF | SRB | Marko Mitrović (Released) |
| 6 | DF | SRB | Aleksandar Komadina (To Sinđelić Niš) |
| 15 | FW | SLO | Milan Rakič (To FK Novi Sad) |
| 9 | MF | SRB | Milorad Zečević (End of career) |
| 33 | FW | BRA | Renan (Released) |
| 22 | MF | CAN | Boban Kajgo (To Hajduk Beograd) |
| — | GK | SRB | Igor Kojić (Released) |
| — | DF | SRB | Jovan Žućović (To Železničar Beograd) |
| — | FW | SRB | Nenad Mladenović (Loan return to (China) Changsha Ginde) |
| — | GK | SRB | Željko Kuzmić (to (Ethiopia) Saint-George SA) |

=== Borac Čačak ===
In: Note: Flags indicate national team as defined under FIFA eligibility rules; some limited exceptions apply. Players may hold more than one non-FIFA nationality.

| No. | Pos. | Nation | Player |
|---|---|---|---|
| 28 | GK | SRB | Nikola Milojević (Free, previously with (Portugal) Vitória Setúbal) |
| 7 | MF | SRB | Slaviša Jeremić (From (Romania) Ceahlăul Piatra Neamţ) |
| 18 | DF | SRB | Radenko Kamberović (On loan from Partizan) |
| 9 | FW | BRA | Washington (On loan from Partizan) |
| — | MF | SRB | Perica Kojić (From Solunac Rastinje) |

Out: Note: Flags indicate national team as defined under FIFA eligibility rules; some limited exceptions apply. Players may hold more than one non-FIFA nationality.

| No. | Pos. | Nation | Player |
|---|---|---|---|
| 33 | GK | SRB | Radiša Ilić (To Partizan) |
| 7 | MF | BRA | Andrezinho (To (Iran) Foolad F.C.) |
| 9 | FW | SRB | Igor Grkajac (To FK Novi Pazar) |
| — | FW | SRB | Aleksandar Kolaković (Was on loan, now transferred to BASK Beograd) |
| — | MF | MNE | Danilo Radulović (To BASK Beograd) |
| — | FW | SRB | Slobodan Vukovljak (To FK Novi Sad) |
| — | MF | MNE | Edi Rustemović (To (Montenegro) Rudar Pljevlja, previously on loan at Mladost Lučani) |
| — | GK | SRB | Nikola Petrić (On loan to Mladost Lučani) |
| — | DF | SRB | Nemanja Milunović (On loan to Mladost Lučani) |

=== BSK Borča ===
In: Note: Flags indicate national team as defined under FIFA eligibility rules; some limited exceptions apply. Players may hold more than one non-FIFA nationality.

| No. | Pos. | Nation | Player |
|---|---|---|---|
| 11 | GK | SRB | Ljubo Kovačević (From (North Macedonia) FK Renova) |
| 8 | FW | SRB | Miloš Reljić (On loan from Red Star Belgrade) |

Out: Note: Flags indicate national team as defined under FIFA eligibility rules; some limited exceptions apply. Players may hold more than one non-FIFA nationality.

| No. | Pos. | Nation | Player |
|---|---|---|---|
| 3 | DF | BIH | Borislav Topić (To (Romania) FCM Târgu Mureş) |
| 15 | DF | MNE | Stefan Savić (To Partizan) |
| 10 | FW | SRB | Vladimir Matić (To FK Novi Pazar) |
| 8 | DF | SRB | Miloš Milivojević (To FK Mladi Radnik) |
| 26 | FW | SRB | Predrag Živadinović (To Radnički Kragujevac) |
| 11 | GK | SRB | Slobodan Janković (To Napredak Kruševac) |
| 17 | FW | SUI | Nikola Nikolić (To (Switzerland) FC Grenchen) |
| 29 | FW | SRB | Amir Memišević (To Budućnost Valjevo) |
| — | MF | SRB | Ivan Obrovac (Loan return to Mačva Šabac) |

=== Čukarički ===
In: Note: Flags indicate national team as defined under FIFA eligibility rules; some limited exceptions apply. Players may hold more than one non-FIFA nationality.

| No. | Pos. | Nation | Player |
|---|---|---|---|
| 1 | GK | SRB | Saša Radivojević (Was on loan, now signed from Red Star Belgrade) |
| 3 | DF | SRB | Ivan Popović (Was on loan, now signed from (Romania) Liberty Salonta) |
| 9 | FW | SRB | Milanko Rašković (From (Romania) Pandurii Târgu Jiu) |
| 20 | MF | SRB | Mihajlo Cakić (From FK Zemun) |
| 7 | MF | SRB | Vladimir Ribić (From (Iran) Tarbiat Yazd) |
| 8 | FW | SRB | Dragan Milovanović (From Borac Čačak) |
| 10 | DF | SRB | Aleksandar Petrović (From (South Korea) Chunnam Dragons) |
| 27 | MF | BIH | Stefan Udovičić (From youth squad) |

Out: Note: Flags indicate national team as defined under FIFA eligibility rules; some limited exceptions apply. Players may hold more than one non-FIFA nationality.

| No. | Pos. | Nation | Player |
|---|---|---|---|
| 10 | FW | SRB | Nikola Trajković (To (Hungary) Győri ETO FC) |
| 14 | MF | SRB | Miroslav Petronijević (Loan return to Rad, next to Napredak Kruševac) |
| 20 | DF | SRB | Bojan Zavišić (To (Kazakhstan) FC Okzhetpes) |
| 6 | DF | MNE | Ivan Kecojević (Loan return to FK Teleoptik, next to OFK Beograd) |
| 13 | DF | SRB | Dražen Okuka (To (Hungary) RFC Kaposvár) |
| — | MF | SRB | Bojan Pavlović (To (Hungary) RFC Kaposvár, was on loan at Metalac G.M.) |
| 7 | FW | SRB | Nikola Grubješić (To (Israel) Hapoel Haifa) |
| — | MF | SRB | Mihailo Dobrašinović (To Kolubara Lazarevac) |
| — | MF | SRB | Miloš Jokić (To BASK Beograd) |
| — | MF | MNE | Marko Filipović (To FK Bežanija) |
| — | DF | SRB | Jovica Tabaković (Released) |
| — | DF | SRB | Nebojša Joksimović (Released) |
| — | GK | SRB | Aleksandar Šarić (End of career) |
| — | FW | SRB | Jovan Džiknić (Released) |

=== Hajduk Kula ===
In: Note: Flags indicate national team as defined under FIFA eligibility rules; some limited exceptions apply. Players may hold more than one non-FIFA nationality.

| No. | Pos. | Nation | Player |
|---|---|---|---|
| 2 | DF | SRB | Miloš Živković (From FK Jagodina, was on loan at Sinđelić Niš) |
| 27 | FW | CRO | Gavro Bagić (From (Croatia) Metalac Osijek) |
| 15 | MF | MKD | Emran Ramadani (From (North Macedonia) FK Teteks) |
| 21 | DF | SRB | Vladimir Kovačević (On loan from FK Vojvodina) |
| 14 | MF | SRB | Slobodan Novaković (On loan from FK Vojvodina) |
| 13 | MF | SRB | Aleksandar Petrović (From Metalac G.M.) |
| 4 | DF | SRB | Siniša Radanović (From (China) Shandong Luneng) |

Out: Note: Flags indicate national team as defined under FIFA eligibility rules; some limited exceptions apply. Players may hold more than one non-FIFA nationality.

| No. | Pos. | Nation | Player |
|---|---|---|---|
| 13 | DF | SRB | Duško Dukić (To (Romania) FC Timişoara) |
| 16 | DF | SRB | Dušan Brković (Loan return to FK Teleoptik, moved to FK Smederevo) |
| 4 | MF | SRB | Branislav Stanić (Loan return to FK Teleoptik, moved to FK Smederevo) |
| 29 | DF | SRB | Branislav Trajković (To FK Vojvodina) |
| 14 | MF | SRB | Dejan Kekezović (Released) |
| — | GK | SRB | Nemanja Jovšić (Released) |
| — | MF | SRB | Bojan Mladenović (To Hajduk Beograd, was on loan at (Montenegro) FK Grbalj) |

=== FK Inđija ===
In: Note: Flags indicate national team as defined under FIFA eligibility rules; some limited exceptions apply. Players may hold more than one non-FIFA nationality.

| No. | Pos. | Nation | Player |
|---|---|---|---|
| 9 | FW | ARG | Guido Barreyro (From FK Novi Sad) |
| 71 | FW | ECU | Augusto Batioja (From FK Novi Sad) |
| 23 | DF | SRB | Branislav Vejnović (From Mladost Apatin) |
| 25 | DF | SRB | Bojan Krasić (From Proleter Novi Sad) |
| 12 | MF | SRB | Milan Davidov (On loan from (Hungary) Nyíregyháza Spartacus) |
| 21 | DF | SRB | Zoran Ljubinković (From Radnički Niš) |
| 26 | MF | BIH | Miroslav Čovilo (From FK Novi Sad) |
| 6 | MF | MNE | Aleksandar Dubljević (From (Montenegro) Sutjeska Nikšić) |
| 4 | DF | SRB | Boris Miličić (On loan from Javor Ivanjica) |
| 15 | MF | SRB | Dragomir Vukobratović (On loan from (Bosnia and Herzegovina) Borac Banja Luka) |

Out: Note: Flags indicate national team as defined under FIFA eligibility rules; some limited exceptions apply. Players may hold more than one non-FIFA nationality.

| No. | Pos. | Nation | Player |
|---|---|---|---|
| — | FW | SRB | Razvan Miličić (To (Italy) Sampdoria) |
| — | DF | SRB | Zoran Milovac (Loan return to OFK Beograd) |
| — | MF | BIH | Adnan Jahić (To (Bosnia and Herzegovina) Budućnost Banovići) |
| — | MF | BIH | Muhamed Omić (To (Bosnia and Herzegovina) Budućnost Banovići) |
| — | FW | SRB | Borivoje Filipović (To (Kazakhstan) Irtysh Pavlodar) |
| 3 | DF | SRB | Jovan Golić (To (Russia) Spartak Nalchik) |
| — | MF | MNE | Darko Karadžić (To (Montenegro) Rudar Pljevlja, was on loan from Rad) |
| — | DF | SRB | Predrag Perišić (Released) |
| — | DF | SRB | Đorđe Lukić (Released) |
| — | DF | SRB | Saša Tomanović (On loan to Radnički Sombor) |
| — | MF | SRB | Danilo Marković (Loan extension to Cement Beočin) |
| — | DF | SRB | Đorđe Lukić (Released, was on loan at Big Bull Bačinci) |

=== Sloboda Point Sevojno ===
In: Note: Flags indicate national team as defined under FIFA eligibility rules; some limited exceptions apply. Players may hold more than one non-FIFA nationality.

| No. | Pos. | Nation | Player |
|---|---|---|---|
| 14 | DF | SRB | Đuro Stevančević (From FK Novi Sad) |
| 18 | MF | SRB | Predrag Lazić (From (Romania) Pandurii Târgu Jiu) |
| 8 | MF | SRB | Njegoš Goločevac (From (Romania) FC Oţelul Galaţi) |
| 3 | MF | GHA | Francis Jojo Bossman (From (Ghana) New Edubiase United) |
| 6 | MF | MKD | Gjorgi Tanušev (From (North Macedonia) Belasica Strumica) |
| 12 | GK | SRB | Bojan Šejić (From (Bosnia and Herzegovina) FK Laktaši) |
| 10 | MF | SRB | Vladimir Vukajlović (From (Russia) Dynamo Bryansk) |
| 20 | MF | SRB | Marko Ljubinković (From (Romania) SC Vaslui) |
| 44 | DF | SRB | Rade Novković (Free, previously with (Russia) Luch-Energiya) |

Out: Note: Flags indicate national team as defined under FIFA eligibility rules; some limited exceptions apply. Players may hold more than one non-FIFA nationality.

| No. | Pos. | Nation | Player |
|---|---|---|---|
| — | DF | SRB | Darko Matejić (Loan return to Šumadija Jagnjilo) |
| — | MF | SRB | Nebojša Gavrilović (Loan return to FK Kovačevac) |
| — | FW | SRB | Ivan Maksimović (Loan return to Sloga Bajina Bašta) |
| — | MF | SRB | Vladislav Virić (To (Uzbekistan) Mash'al Mubarek) |
| — | MF | BIH | Aleksandar Brđanin (To (Uzbekistan) Mash'al Mubarek) |
| — | DF | SRB | Savo Raković (To (Hungary) Diósgyőri VTK) |
| — | DF | SRB | Marko Kostić (To Sinđelić Niš) |
| — | MF | SRB | Marin Miok (Released) |
| — | MF | SRB | Milan Antonijević (Released) |
| — | FW | SRB | Dušan Janković (To Sloga Bajina Bašta) |
| — | FW | SRB | Damir Skorupan (Released) |
| — | FW | SRB | Bojan Brajković (To Kolubara Lazarevac) |
| — | MF | SRB | Lazar Jovičić (Released) |
| — | MF | SRB | Stefan Lijeskić (Released) |
| — | DF | SRB | Vladimir Sandulović (Released) |
| — | DF | SRB | Darko Matejić (To OFK Mladenovac) |
| — | DF | SRB | Nikola Stanojević (Released) |
| — | GK | SRB | Darko Rogić (Released) |
| — | DF | SRB | Strahinja Aritonović (To FK Sopot) |

== See also ==
- Serbian Superliga
- Serbian Superliga 2009–10
- List of foreign football players in Serbia
- List of Serbian football transfers winter 2009–10
- List of Serbian football transfers summer 2009
