= Savanović =

Savanović (Cyrillic script: Савановић) is a Serbian surname. It may refer to:

- Duško Savanović (born 1983), basketball player
- Miroslav Savanović (born 1985), football midfielder
- Sava Savanović, legendary vampire
