= Saša Mišić =

Saša Mišić may refer to:

- Saša Mišić (footballer) (born 1987), Serbian football goalkeeper
- Saša Mišić (water polo) (born 1987), Montenegrin water polo player
