= Miloš Živković =

Miloš Živković may refer to:

- Miloš Živković (footballer, born December 1984), Serbian football defender
- Miloš Živković (footballer, born 1985), Serbian football defender
- Miloš Živković (writer) (born 1974), Serbian author
