= Saša Blagojević =

Serbian footballer

Personal information
- Full name: Saša Blagojević
- Date of birth: 1 February 1989 (age 37)
- Place of birth: Smederevo, SFR Yugoslavia
- Height: 1.81 m (5 ft 11 in)
- Position: Defender

Team information
- Current team: 1. FC Südring Aschaffenburg

Senior career*
Years	Team	Apps	(Gls)
2007–2008	Teleoptik	11	(0)
2008–2009	Jagodina	18	(0)
2009–2010	Kazma	9	(0)
2010–2011	Teleoptik	9	(0)
2011–2012	Smederevo	4	(0)
2012–2013	Teleoptik	4	(0)
2013–2014	Smederevo	37	(1)
2014–2015	Šaľa	10	(1)
2015–2016	Pajde Möhlin		
2016–2017	Žarkovo		
2018	GFK Tabane		
2018–2019	Jagodina Tabane		
2020–	1. FC Südring Aschaffenburg		

International career
2005–2006	Serbia and Montenegro U17		
- * Club domestic league appearances and goals as of 24 August 2014

Saša Blagojević (Serbian Cyrillic: Саша Благојевић; born 1 February 1989) is a Serbian professional footballer who plays as a defender for 1. FC Südring Aschaffenburg.

== Career ==
Blagojević began playing football in FK Partizan's youth system before playing professionally with Smederevo.

Blagojević represented Serbia and Montenegro in the 2006 UEFA European Under-17 Championship. He also played for Serbia at the under-20 level.
