= Emanuel Oletu =

Nigerian footballer

Emmanuel Oletu
Personal information
- Date of birth: 8 December 1983 (age 42)
- Place of birth: Lagos, Nigeria
- Height: 1.88 m (6 ft 2 in)
- Position: Defender

Senior career*
Years	Team	Apps	(Gls)
2003	Kwara United		
2004	Wienerberg		
2004	Kapfenberg		
2005	Senec		
2005	SV Donau	1	(0)
2006	Rennweger SV 1901		
2006–2008	SC Eisenstadt	36	(3)
2008–2010	Spartak Subotica	33	(0)
2011–2012	SC Columbia Floridsdorf	12	(1)
2012	1. Simmeringer SC	11	(0)
2013	Ostbahn XI	0	(0)
2013–2016	SC Hainfeld		
2016	Pilgersdorf		
2017	Post SV Wien		
2018	SC Hainfeld		
- * Club domestic league appearances and goals as of 12 April 2018

Emmanuel Oletu (born 8 December 1983) is a Nigerian football defender.

== Career ==
In summer 2003 he moved to Austria. After several seasons there, playing for SV Kapfenberg, SV Donau and SC Eisenstadt, Oletu moved, in 2008, to Serbia to play in the historic FK Spartak Subotica. After a successful first season where he was the pillar of the team's defence, the club gained promotion to the Serbian SuperLiga in 2009. In summer 2010 he left, having played his last match with Spartak at the qualifying round 2 of the 2010–11 UEFA Europa League game against FC Differdange 03.

In 2011, he moved back to Austria joining Austrian Regional League East side SC Columbia Floridsdorf. In summer 2012 he moved to same level club 1. Simmeringer SC. and during the winter break of the 2012–13 season he moved to SC Ostbahn XI.
