= Igor Mišan =

Bosnian Serb footballer

Personal information
- Date of birth: 5 May 1990 (age 36)
- Place of birth: Bugojno, SFR Yugoslavia
- Height: 1.81 m (5 ft 11 in)
- Position: Midfielder

Youth career
- 2003–2007: OFK Beograd

Senior career*
Years	Team	Apps	(Gls)
2007–2011	OFK Beograd	17	(0)
2009	→ Radnički Sombor (loan)	16	(1)
2010–2011	→ Spartak Subotica (loan)	2	(0)
2011–2012	RFK Novi Sad	29	(1)
2013–2014	Rudar Prijedor	39	(5)
2014	Karviná	0	(0)
2015	Mladost Velika Obarska	14	(0)
2015–2016	Zvijezda Gradačac	25	(3)
2016	Radnik Surdulica	13	(1)
2017	Hamrun Spartans	13	(1)
2017–2019	Pembroke Athleta	44	(3)
2019–2020	Victoria Wanderers		
2020–2021	Senglea Athletic	20	(0)

International career
2014	Republika Srpska U23	1	(0)
- * Club domestic league appearances and goals as of 10 April 2021

Igor Mišan (Serbian Cyrillic: Игор Мишан; born 5 May 1990) is a Bosnian Serb footballer who plays as a midfielder.

== Club career ==
Born in Bugojno, SR Bosnia and Herzegovina, then still within SFR Yugoslavia, Mišan started playing football in Serbia in OFK Beograd youth team. In 2007, he was promoted to the first team, however he first spent a loan at FK Radnički Sombor, and then a loan at FK Spartak Subotica where he played in the 2010–11 Serbian SuperLiga. Next he moved to Serbian First League side RFK Novi Sad where he played between summer 2011 and the winter break of the 2012–13 season when he signed with FK Rudar Prijedor playing then in the Bosnian Premier League. In summer 2014 he signed with MFK Karviná playing in the Czech Second League, but in December he left the club by mutual agreement as he spent most time injured.

On 17 August 2019 it was confirmed, that Mišan had joined Victoria Wanderers. He moved to Senglea Athletic in August 2020.

== International career ==
Mišan good exhibitions made him receive a call on behalf of coach Branimir Tutić to play for the Republika Srpska national under-23 football team against Udinese played on 12 March 2014, and he played as starter the entire match.
