= Dejan Perić (footballer) =

Serbian footballer

Personal information
- Full name: Dejan Perić
- Date of birth: 16 April 1979 (age 47)
- Place of birth: Pančevo, SFR Yugoslavia
- Height: 1.78 m (5 ft 10 in)
- Position: Right-back

Senior career*
Years	Team	Apps	(Gls)
1996–2003	Dinamo Pančevo	117	(3)
2003–2005	Obilić	50	(0)
2006	Voždovac	12	(0)
2006	Panserraikos		
2007	Dinamo Pančevo		
2007–2009	Čukarički	23	(0)
2009–2010	Sloga Kraljevo	21	(0)
2010–2011	Banat Zrenjanin	21	(1)
2010	Mačva Šabac		
2011	Hajduk Kula	4	(0)
2011–2012	Dinamo Pančevo		
- * Club domestic league appearances and goals as of 16 July 2014

Dejan Perić (Serbian Cyrillic: Дејан Перић; born 16 April 1979 in Pančevo, SFR Yugoslavia) is a Serbian retired professional footballer who played as a defender.

He began his senior career with Dinamo Pančevo (1996–2003), appearing in 117 league matches and scoring 3 goals.

He then moved to FK Obilić (2003–2005), making 50 appearances and scoring no goals.

In 2006, he played for FK Voždovac (12 appearances) and had a spell abroad with Panserraikos F.C. in Greece.

Then he returned back to Dinamo Pančevo in 2007, then went on to play for FK Čukarički (2007-2009; 23 caps) and FK Sloga Kraljevo (2009-2010; 21 caps).

Later in his career he had stints with FK Banat Zrenjanin (2010-2011; 21 caps, 1 goal) and FK Hajduk Kula (2011; 4 caps).
