= Vladan Spasojević =

Serbian footballer

Personal information
- Full name: Vladan Spasojević
- Date of birth: 11 October 1980 (age 46)
- Place of birth: Titova Mitrovica, SR Serbia, SFR Yugoslavia
- Height: 1.77 m (5 ft 10 in)
- Position: Midfielder

Youth career
- Trepča

Senior career*
Years	Team	Apps	(Gls)
1998–2003	Bane		
2003–2008	Borac Čačak	126	(11)
2008–2010	Jagodina	46	(4)
2010	Košice	7	(0)
2011	Novi Pazar	24	(3)
2012	Mladost Lučani	33	(0)
2013–2016	Kolubara	89	(6)
2017–2021	TEK Sloga		
2022	Dimitrije Tucović		
- * Club domestic league appearances and goals

Vladan Spasojević (Serbian Cyrillic: Владан Спасојевић; born 11 October 1980) is a Serbian former professional footballer who played as a midfielder.

== Career ==
During a career that spanned over two decades, Spasojević is best remembered for his time at Borac Čačak, spending five years with the club from 2003 to 2008. He amassed 126 appearances and scored 11 goals for the side in the top flight. Following two seasons with Jagodina in the Serbian SuperLiga, Spasojević moved abroad and briefly played for Slovak club Košice. He subsequently returned to his homeland and agreed terms with Serbian First League side Novi Pazar.
