= Miguel Lavié =

Uruguayan footballer (born 1986)

Personal information
- Full name: Miguel Angel Lavié da Cunda
- Date of birth: 15 April 1986 (age 40)
- Place of birth: Las Piedras, Uruguay
- Height: 1.84 m (6 ft 0 in)
- Position: Central defender

Youth career
- 2000–2003: Juventud de Las Piedras

Senior career*
Years	Team	Apps	(Gls)
2003	Juventud de Las Piedras		
2004–2006	Peñarol		
2006–2007	→ Bella Vista (loan)		
2007	Juventud de Las Piedras		
2008	Criciúma		
2008–2009	Avaí	7	(0)
2009–2010	Javor Ivanjica	0	(0)
2010–2011	Rio Claro		
2011–2013	Suchitepéquez	75	(3)
2013–2014	Heredia	23	(3)
2014	Deportivo Coatepeque	6	(0)
2015–2016	Real Estelí	3	(0)
2016–2017	Villa Española		
2017	Huracán	4	(0)

International career^{‡}
2002–2003	Uruguay U-17	25	(?)
2004–2005	Uruguay U-20		
- * Club domestic league appearances and goals as of 1 January 2018 ‡ National team caps and goals as of 1 January 2018

Miguel Angel Lavié da Cunda, better known simply as Miguel Lavié (born 15 April 1986), is an Uruguayan professional football defender who last played for Huracán F.C. in the Uruguayan Segunda División.

== Club career ==
Born in Las Piedras, during his career he had previously played for Uruguayan clubs Juventud de Las Piedras, C.A. Peñarol and C.A. Bella Vista, Brazilian Criciúma Esporte Clube and Avaí Futebol Clube and a brief spell with Serbian SuperLiga club FK Javor Ivanjica along his compatriot Gerardo Vonder Pütten. In 2010, he moved back to Brazil to play with Campeonato Paulista side Rio Claro Futebol Clube. In May 2011 he signed with Liga Nacional de Fútbol de Guatemala club C.D. Suchitepéquez. He then played in Guatemala with Heredia Jaguares de Peten and Deportivo Coatepeque.

In January 2015 he left Guatemala and signed with Real Estelí F.C. playing in the Nicaraguan Primera División where he stayed till next January. It was then that he returned to Uruguay after so long having been playing abroad, and joined C.S.D. Villa Española. He helped Villa Española to finish runner-up of the 2015–16 Uruguayan Segunda División and get promotion to the 2016 Uruguayan Primera División. However, the team finished bottom and was relegated back to second level. In March 2017, Lavié left Villa Española and signed with another club from Montevideo also competing in second level, Huracán F.C.

== National team ==
Lavié was part of the Uruguayan national under-17 and under-20 teams.

He was in the Uruguay team that won the U-17 International Soccer Tournament, played in September 2002 in Italy, which was held in memory of the September 11 attacks. He was the captain at the 2003 South American Under-17 Football Championship where Uruguay finished 4th. Afterwards, he was part of Uruguay team at the 2005 South American Youth Championship.

== External sources ==
- Miguel Lavié at BDFA (in Spanish)
