= Stefan Udovičić =

Bosnian footballer (born 1991)

Personal information
- Date of birth: 20 September 1991 (age 35)
- Place of birth: Banja Luka, SFR Yugoslavia
- Height: 1.82 m (6 ft 0 in)
- Position: Midfielder

Youth career
- Red Bull Salzburg
- 2008–2010: Čukarički

Senior career*
Years	Team	Apps	(Gls)
2007	ESV Freilassing		
2008	Austria Salzburg	7	(1)
2010–2011	Čukarički	6	(0)
2011–2012	Radnički Kragujevac	0	(0)
2012	Radnik Bijeljina		
2013	Gradina Srebrenik	10	(1)
2013–2014	Leotar	16	(0)
2014–2015	Gradina Srebrenik		
2015	Novi Travnik		
2016	Bratstvo Gračanica		
2016	Olimpik Sarajevo	5	(0)
2017	Radnički Lukavac		
2017–2019	Čelik Zenica	14	(0)
2019–2020	Gabčíkovo		

International career
2009	Bosnia and Herzegovina U-19		
- * Club domestic league appearances and goals

Stefan Udovičić (Serbian Cyrillic: Стефан Удовичић, born 20 September 1991) is a Bosnian footballer who most recently played for Slovak third-tier side ŠK 1923 Gabčíkovo.

== Club career ==
Born in Banja Luka, SR Bosnia and Herzegovina, then still within Yugoslavia, Udovičić moved abroad at a young age to Austria. He joined the academy of FC Red Bull Salzburg in February 2007. Udovičić then joined German club, ESV Freilassing, in the summer 2007. In the beginning of 2008, Udovičić returned to Austria and joined 6th level SV Austria Salzburg. He was used in a few friendly games for the first team, but however, he didn't make it to the first team squad and was registered for the club's U23 team. However, he did play a few games for the first team as well.

In 2008, he returned to Serbia with SuperLiga side FK Čukarički and was promoted to the first team in the 2010–11 season. Then he moved to another Serbian top-flight side, FK Radnički 1923, but he failed to make any league appearances, so he returned to Bosnia and signed FK Radnik Bijeljina. His next stop was newly promoted Bosnian Premier League side OFK Gradina. In summer 2013 he moved to FK Leotar.

Ahead of the 2019–20 season, Udovičić joined Slovak club ŠK 1923 Gabčíkovo.

== International career ==
In June 2009 he was part of the Bosnia and Herzegovina U-19 team.
