= Srđan Lukić =

Serbian footballer

Personal information
- Full name: Srđan Lukić
- Date of birth: December 1, 1981 (age 44)
- Place of birth: Jagodina, SFR Yugoslavia
- Height: 1.80 m (5 ft 11 in)
- Position: Defender

Youth career
- Jagodina

Senior career*
Years	Team	Apps	(Gls)
2001–2005	Morava Ćuprija	21	(0)
2006–2010	Jagodina	65	(0)
- * Club domestic league appearances and goals

Srđan Lukić (Serbian Cyrillic: Cpђaн Лукић; born December 1, 1981, in Jagodina) is a Serbian retired footballer.

== External sources ==
- Profile at Srbijafudbal.
