= Uroš Vemić =

Serbian-born Montenegrin footballer

Personal information
- Full name: Uroš Vemić
- Date of birth: 22 January 1987 (age 39)
- Place of birth: Belgrade, SFR Yugoslavia
- Height: 1.83 m (6 ft 0 in)
- Position: Forward

Senior career*
Years	Team	Apps	(Gls)
2004–2007	Zemun	11	(0)
2004–2005	→ Jedinstvo Surčin (loan)	4	(1)
2005–2006	→ Radnički Beograd (loan)	9	(3)
2007	Bokelj	10	(2)
2008–2009	Jagodina	8	(0)
2009	Mladost Lučani	14	(0)
2010	Kom	8	(2)
2010–2017	Kovačevac		
Total		64	(8)
- * Club domestic league appearances and goals

Uroš Vemić (Serbian Cyrillic: Урош Вемић; born 22 January 1987) is a Serbian retired footballer.

== Club career ==
He has previously played in Serbian SuperLiga clubs FK Zemun and FK Jagodina, also Second league clubs FK Jedinstvo Surčin, FK Radnički Beograd and FK Mladost Lučani beside Montenegrin clubs FK Budućnost Podgorica and FK Kom.
