= Srđan Novković =

Serbian footballer

Personal information
- Full name: Srđan Novković
- Date of birth: March 29, 1983 (age 43)
- Place of birth: Belgrade, SFR Yugoslavia
- Height: 1.82 m (6 ft 0 in)
- Position: Midfielder

Youth career
- Red Star Belgrade

Senior career*
Years	Team	Apps	(Gls)
2001	Red Star Belgrade	0	(0)
2002–2003	Varese	7	(0)
2003–2004	Vojvodina	4	(0)
2004–2007	Čukarički	90	(10)
2007	Napredak Kruševac	15	(0)
2008	Slavia Sofia	10	(0)
2009	Napredak Kruševac	16	(1)
2009–2011	Jagodina	54	(7)
2011–2012	Hajduk Kula	29	(1)
2012–2013	Voždovac	28	(2)
2013–2014	BSK Borča	8	(0)
2014	Sloga Kraljevo	6	(0)
2015–2019	Lokomotiva Beograd		
- * Club domestic league appearances and goals

Srđan Novković (Serbian Cyrillic: Срђан Новковић; born 29 March 1983) is a Serbian retired footballer.

He previously played for Italian A.S. Varese 1910, FK Vojvodina, FK Čukarički, FK Napredak Kruševac and PFC Slavia Sofia.
