= Nenad Nedeljković =

Serbian footballer

Personal information
- Full name: Nenad Nedeljković
- Date of birth: 10 October 1986 (age 40)
- Place of birth: Šabac, SFR Yugoslavia
- Height: 1.83 m (6 ft 0 in)
- Position: Striker

Youth career
- Partizan

Senior career*
Years	Team	Apps	(Gls)
2004–2005	Grafičar Beograd		
2005	Tenhults		
2005–2007	Vujić Voda		
2007–2008	Blois		
2008–2009	Borac Čačak	0	(0)
2009	→ Mladost Lučani (loan)	10	(0)
2009–2010	Mladi Radnik	38	(6)
2011	Vujić Voda		
2011–2012	Mladi Radnik	25	(5)
2012	Novi Sad	12	(3)
2013	Proleter Novi Sad	17	(0)
2014	Železničar Lajkovac		
2015	Drina Zvornik	12	(2)
2015	Dinamo Vranje	5	(0)
- * Club domestic league appearances and goals as of 22 January 2016

Nenad Nedeljković (Serbian Cyrillic: Ненад Недељковић; born 10 October 1986) is a Serbian former footballer who played as a forward.
