= Asmir Misini =

Serbian footballer

Personal information
- Full name: Asmir Misini
- Date of birth: 29 September 1985 (age 41)
- Place of birth: Novi Sad, SR Serbia, SFR Yugoslavia
- Height: 1.74 m (5 ft 9 in)
- Position: Forward

Youth career
- Vojvodina

Senior career*
Years	Team	Apps	(Gls)
2003	Elan Srbobran	12	(2)
2004	Veternik	28	(11)
2005	Glogonj	12	(7)
2005–2006	PSK Pančevo	32	(14)
2006–2007	Obilić	0	(0)
2007	→ Čukarički (loan)	11	(1)
2007–2009	ČSK Čelarevo	56	(14)
2009–2010	Spartak Subotica	14	(0)
2010	Novi Pazar	10	(0)
2011	Inđija	4	(0)
2012	Čukarički	31	(4)
2013	Šumadija Jagnjilo		
2014	Hajduk Beograd		
2015	Dinamo Vranje		
2015	Proleter Vranovo		
2016	Radnički Nova Pazova		
2016–2017	Kačer Belanovica		
2017	Hajduk Beograd		
2018	Budućnost Zvečka		
2019–2020	Šumadija Šopić		
2021	Donji Srem		
- * Club domestic league appearances and goals

Asmir Misini (Serbian Cyrillic: Асмир Мисини; born 29 September 1985) is a Serbian former professional footballer who played as a forward.

== Career ==
After playing for Šumadija Jagnjilo and Hajduk Beograd in the Serbian League Belgrade, Misini moved to Serbian League East side Dinamo Vranje in the 2015 winter transfer window, helping the club win the title and promotion to the Serbian First League.

In the 2016–17 season, Misini played for Kačer Belanovica in the Kolubara District League, the fifth level of Serbian football. He subsequently returned to his former club Hajduk Beograd for the 2017–18 Belgrade Zone League. After playing for fellow Belgrade Zone League side Budućnost Zvečka, Misini moved to Belgrade First League club Šumadija Šopić in the 2019 winter transfer window.

== Honours ==
Glogonj

- Serbian League Vojvodina: 2004–05

Dinamo Vranje

- Serbian League East: 2014–15
