= Mihailo Dobrašinović =

Serbian footballer

Personal information
- Date of birth: June 19, 1986 (age 40)
- Place of birth: Zemun, SFR Yugoslavia
- Height: 1.87 m (6 ft 1 1/2 in)
- Position: Midfielder

Senior career*
Years	Team	Apps	(Gls)
2004–2010	Čukarički	40	(0)
2008–2009	→ Smederevo (loan)	24	(3)
2010	Srem Jakovo	12	(2)
2010–2011	Kolubara	13	(1)
2011	Hajduk Kula	0	(0)
2011–2012	Bežanija	25	(2)
2012–2013	Mladenovac	26	(5)
2013	Zemun	10	(1)
2014	BSK Borča	23	(3)
2015	Mačva Šabac	5	(0)
2015	Sinđelić Beograd	14	(2)
Total		192	(19)
- * Club domestic league appearances and goals as of 28 February 2016

Mihailo Dobrašinović (Serbian Cyrillic: Михаило Добрашиновић; born 19 June 1986) is a Serbian footballer.

He previously played with FK Čukarički between 2004 and winter break of the 2009-10 season. He went on loan to FK Smederevo for the 2008–09 Serbian First League season helping them achieve promotion to the SuperLiga. He had also played with lower leagues FK Srem Jakovo and FK Kolubara before signing with FK Hajduk Kula.
