= Slaviša Jeremić =

Serbian footballer

Personal information
- Full name: Slaviša Jeremić
- Date of birth: 15 February 1983 (age 43)
- Place of birth: Belgrade, SFR Yugoslavia
- Height: 1.74 m (5 ft 8 1/2 in)
- Position: Midfielder

Senior career*
| Years | Team | Apps | (Gls) |
| 2001–2002 | Obilić | 0 | (0) |
| 2003–2004 | Mladost Lučani | 56 | (19) |
| 2005–2008 | Radnički Beograd | 13 | (2) |
| 2005 | → Voždovac (loan) | 1 | (0) |
| 2006 | → Bežanija (loan) | 13 | (2) |
| 2006–2008 | → Mladost Lučani (loan) | 51 | (5) |
| 2008–2009 | Rad | 23 | (0) |
| 2009 | → Metalac GM (loan) | 11 | (1) |
| 2010–2011 | Ceahlăul Piatra Neamț | 10 | (0) |
| 2010 | → Borac Čačak (loan) | 8 | (0) |
| 2011–2012 | Mladost Lučani | 21 | (3) |
| 2012 | Jedinstvo Užice | 12 | (4) |
| 2013 | Rabotnički | 8 | (0) |
| 2013 | Jedinstvo Užice | 15 | (1) |
| 2014 | Bežanija | 7 | (0) |
| 2015–2016 | Zemun | 18 | (0) |
- * Club domestic league appearances and goals as of 18 January 2016

Slaviša Jeremić (Serbian Cyrillic: Славиша Јеремић; born 15 February 1983) is a Serbian retired football midfielder.
