= Igor Bondžulić =

Serbian footballer and manager

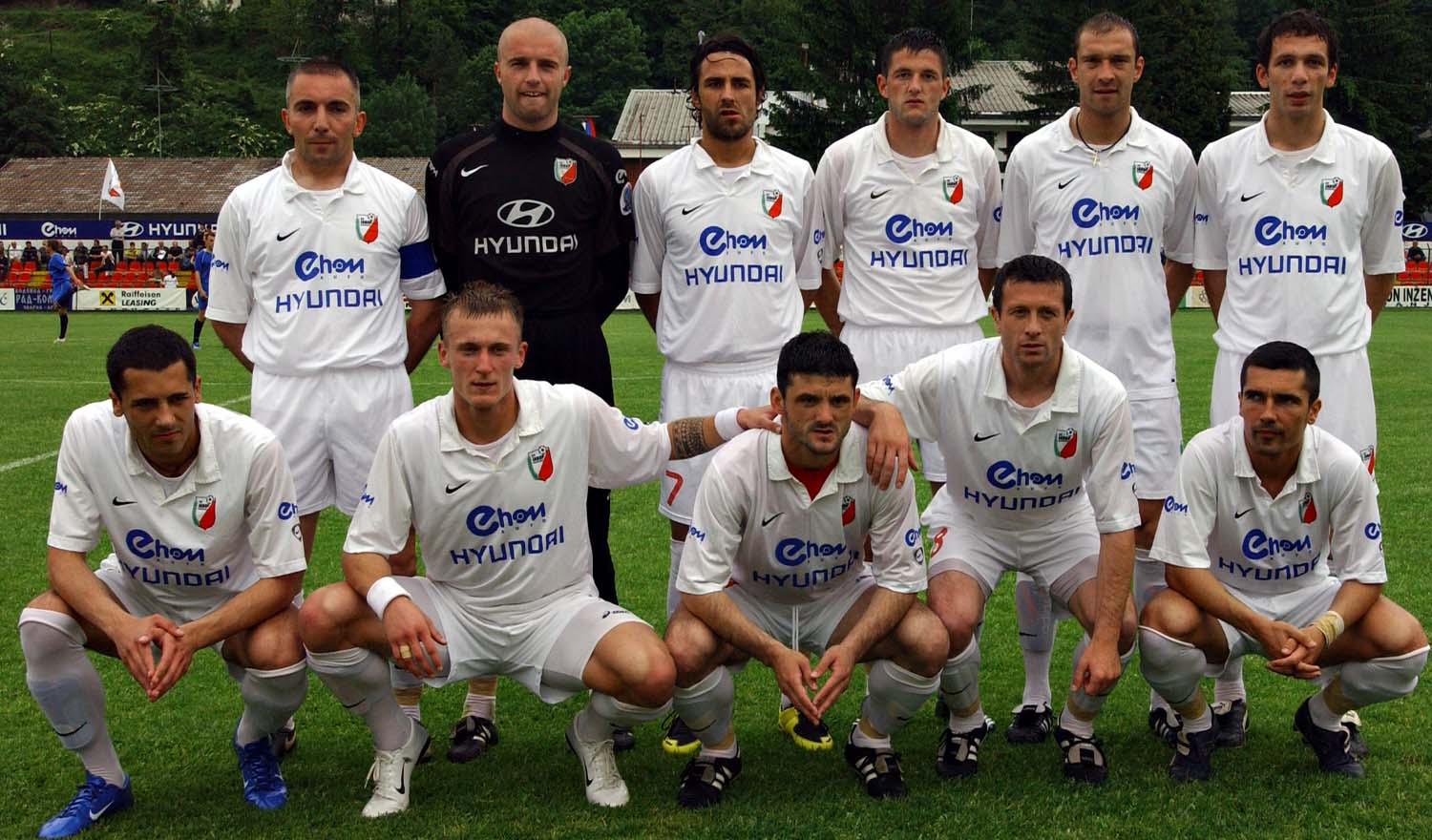
- Bondžulić with Javor Ivanjica in 2008

Personal information
- Date of birth: 5 October 1980 (age 46)
- Place of birth: Užička Požega, SFR Yugoslavia
- Height: 1.91 m (6 ft 3 in)
- Position: Goalkeeper

Youth career
- Sloga Požega

Senior career*
Years	Team	Apps	(Gls)
2001–2008	Javor Ivanjica	178	(0)
2008–2009	Lokomotiv Sofia	15	(0)
2009–2010	Javor Ivanjica	3	(0)
2010–2013	Jagodina	47	(0)
2013–2014	Moroka Swallows	0	(0)
Total		243	(0)

Managerial career
- 2014–2016: Jagodina (assistant)
- 2016: Jagodina (caretaker)
- 2017–2018: Radnik Surdulica (assistant)
- 2018–2019: Čukarički (first-team coach)
- 2019–2021: Javor Ivanjica
- 2021: Radnik Surdulica
- 2022: Javor Ivanjica
- 2025: Borac Čačak
- * Club domestic league appearances and goals

Igor Bondžulić (Serbian Cyrillic: Игор Бонџулић; born 5 October 1980) is a Serbian professional football manager and a former player who played as a goalkeeper.

== Playing career ==
After starting out at Sloga Požega, Bondžulić joined Javor Ivanjica in the early 2000s. He made over 150 appearances for the club, before moving abroad and signing with Bulgarian side Lokomotiv Sofia in 2008.

While playing for Jagodina, Bondžulić helped them win the Serbian Cup in 2013. He also spent one season with Moroka Swallows in South Africa, before retiring from the game.

== Managerial career ==
After hanging up his boots, Bondžulić served as an assistant and later caretaker manager at his former club Jagodina. He subsequently assisted Simo Krunić at Radnik Surdulica.

In June 2019, Bondžulić was appointed manager of newly promoted Serbian SuperLiga club Javor Ivanjica.

== Managerial statistics ==
As of 7 October 2022

Managerial record by team and tenure
Team	From	To	Record				
Team	From	To	P	W	D	L	Win %
Javor Ivanjica	June 2019	Jun 2021	71	19	20	32	26.76
Radnik Surdulica	June 2021	September 2021	8	2	3	3	25.00
Javor Ivanjica	March 2022	October 2022	27	11	5	11	40.74
Total			106	32	28	46	30.19

== Honours ==
Javor Ivanjica

- Serbian First League: 2007–08

Jagodina

- Serbian Cup: 2012–13
