= Miroslav Petronijević =

Serbian footballer

Personal information
- Full name: Miroslav Petronijević
- Date of birth: 6 December 1987 (age 38)
- Place of birth: Belgrade, SFR Yugoslavia
- Height: 1.78 m (5 ft 10 in)
- Position: Midfielder

Senior career*
| Years | Team | Apps | (Gls) |
| 2005–2009 | Čukarički | 3 | (0) |
| 2006 | → Radnički Nova Pazova (loan) | 13 | (0) |
| 2007 | → Policajac Beograd (loan) | | |
| 2008 | → Radnički Pirot (loan) | 15 | (2) |
| 2009–2010 | Rad | 5 | (0) |
| 2005–2009 | → Čukarički (loan) | 14 | (2) |
| 2010 | Napredak Kruševac | 15 | (3) |
| 2011 | Čukarički | 12 | (1) |
| 2011 | Napredak Kruševac | 17 | (2) |
| 2012–2013 | Voždovac | 26 | (3) |
| 2013–2015 | IMT | | |
| 2015–2016 | Sloga Petrovac | 18 | (0) |
| 2016–2017 | Omladinac Novi Banovci | | |
| 2018 | GSP Polet | | |
| 2018–2019 | Podunavac Belegiš | | |
- * Club domestic league appearances and goals as of 30 May 2016

Miroslav Petronijević (Serbian Cyrillic: Мирослав Петронијевић; born 6 December 1987) is a Serbian retired football midfielder.
