= Cauê (footballer, born 1987) =

Brazilian footballer

Personal information
- Full name: Roberto Carvalho Cauê
- Date of birth: 22 April 1987 (age 39)
- Place of birth: Porto Alegre, Brazil
- Height: 1.84 m (6 ft 0 in)
- Position: Defender

Team information
- Current team: Luziânia

Youth career
- 2001–2005: Internacional

Senior career*
Years	Team	Apps	(Gls)
2005–2007	Internacional		
2007	Ceará		
2007	Internacional		
2008	Politehnica Iaşi	0	(0)
2008	Metropolitano		
2009	ABC		
2009	Nacional AM		
2009–2010	OFK Belgrade	9	(0)
2010	Drina Zvornik	7	(0)
2011	Gama	1	(0)
2011	Capital		
2012	Canoas	4	(0)
2012	Sobradinho		
2012	Novo Hamburgo		
2013	Sobradinho	1	(0)
2013	Ji-Paraná		
2014	Brasiliense	4	(0)
2014	Rio Branco	5	(0)
2015	Sobradinho		
2016	Luziânia	1	(1)

International career^{‡}
	Brazil U-17	2	(0)
- * Club domestic league appearances and goals as of 19 June 2016 ‡ National team caps and goals as of 19 June 2016

Roberto Carvalho Cauê (born April 22, 1987), known as just Cauê, is a Brazilian football defender playing for Luziânia.

== Career ==
=== Early career ===
Cauê started his career by playing with Internacional from Porto Alegre. While still a youngster, he was part of the Brazilian U-17 national team, having made two appearances for them. In 2007, he played with Ceará Sporting Club in the Campeonato Brasileiro Série B. The following year, he moved abroad for the first time, joining Romanian side FC Politehnica Iași, however he failed to make a debut in the Liga I. After this short spell in Europe, he moved back to Brazil and during the following year and a half he has represented Clube Atlético Metropolitano, ABC Futebol Clube and Nacional Futebol Clube.

=== Return to Europe ===
In 2009, Cauê returned to Europe, and after a successful trial, he signed with Serbian SuperLiga side OFK Beograd where he played during the 2009-10 season. At the end of the season his club finished third in the league, thus booking their place in the UEFA Europa League qualifying rounds for the next season. However due to the foreign players limit in the domestic championship, and fierce competition for a place in the starting line-up, Cauê left OFK and became one of the main signings of the newly promoted Bosnian Premier League side FK Drina Zvornik. He made seven league appearances, but at the winter break he was released and he returned to Brazil.

=== Back to Brazil ===
In early 2011 Cauê was back in Brazil. He joined Sociedade Esportiva do Gama playing in the Campeonato Brasileiro Série D. The club did a complete renovation of their stadium during 2008; however the enthusiasm did not transfer to the field and Gama performed poorly. During the summer, Cauê joined Capital Clube de Futebol, another club from Brasília, that by August was undertaking a major project, merging with Goiás state club Cristalina Futebol Clube, and forming a new squad. This adventure lasted until early 2012, when Cauê moved to Canoas Sport Club playing in the Campeonato Gaúcho.

== External sources ==
- Profile at Srbijafudbal
