= Radojica Vasić =

Serbian footballer

Personal information
- Date of birth: 25 January 1976 (age 50)
- Place of birth: Priština, SFR Yugoslavia
- Height: 1.82 m (5 ft 11 1/2 in)
- Position: Midfielder

Team information
- Current team: Mladost Lučani (assistant coach)

Senior career*
Years	Team	Apps	(Gls)
1995–1997	Mladost Lučani	47	(1)
1997–1998	Vojvodina	6	(0)
1998–2000	Mladost Lučani	73	(5)
2000	Uralan Elista	8	(0)
2001	Slavia Mozyr	22	(5)
2002	Mladost Lučani	14	(0)
2002–2006	Javor Ivanjica	104	(2)
2006–2008	Mladost Lučani	52	(1)
2008–2009	Smederevo	26	(0)
2009–2010	Metalac Gornji Milanovac	23	(0)
2010–2014	Mladost Lučani	97	(4)
Total		472	(18)

Managerial career
- 2014–2019: Mladost Lučani (assistant)
- 2019: Radnik Surdulica (assistant)
- 2021: OFK Bačka (assistant)
- 2022: Jedinstvo Stara Pazova (assistant)
- 2022–: Mladost Lučani (assistant)
- * Club domestic league appearances and goals

Radojica Vasić (Serbian Cyrillic: Радојица Васић; born 25 January 1976) is a Serbian football coach and a former defensive midfielder. He is an assistant coach with hometown club Mladost Lučani and spent most of his career playing for the club.

== Honours ==
Mladost Lučani

- Serbian First League: 2006–07, 2013–14
