= Bojan Čukić =

Serbian footballer

Personal information
- Full name: Bojan Čukić
- Date of birth: 5 February 1988 (age 38)
- Place of birth: Belgrade, SFR Yugoslavia
- Height: 1.84 m (6 ft 0 in)
- Position: Defensive midfielder

Youth career
- Partizan

Senior career*
Years	Team	Apps	(Gls)
2005–2007	Partizan	0	(0)
2005–2007	→ Teleoptik (loan)	29	(1)
2007	→ Kolubara (loan)	13	(3)
2008	Metalac Gornji Milanovac	14	(1)
2008–2009	Gaz Metan Mediaș	0	(0)
2009	Javor Ivanjica	6	(0)
2010	MFK Košice	4	(0)
2011	Banat Zrenjanin	12	(0)
2011–2012	Borac Čačak	1	(0)
2012	→ Vršac (loan)	13	(3)
2013	Smederevo	11	(0)
2013–2014	Sloga Petrovac	23	(1)
2014	Grbalj	6	(1)
2015	Moravac Mrštane	14	(10)
2015-2016	Radnik Surdulica	1	(0)
2015	→ Sloga Petrovac (loan)	9	(2)
2016–2017	OFK Vršac		
2017–2018	Dunav Banatska Palanka		
2018	Favoritner AC	1	(0)
2018–2020	OFK Vršac		
- * Club domestic league appearances and goals as of 5 March 2019

Bojan Čukić (Serbian Cyrillic: Бојан Чукић; born 5 February 1988) is a Serbian professional footballer who plays as a defensive midfielder.

A product of the Partizan youth system, Čukić failed to make a single appearance for the club.
