= Solomon Oladele =

Nigerian footballer

Personal information
- Full name: Solomon Gbadegeshin Oladele
- Date of birth: May 19, 1990 (age 36)
- Place of birth: Lagos, Nigeria
- Height: 1.75 m (5 ft 9 in)
- Position: Striker

Team information
- Current team: Green mamba
- Number: 27

Youth career
- Robo
- Young Stars
- 2008: Academia Vejle

Senior career*
Years	Team	Apps	(Gls)
2008–2009	Jagodina	1	(1)
2009–2010	→ Sinđelić Niš (loan)	8	(0)
2011–201x	Green Mamba		
201x–2017	Red Lions		
2017–	Green Mamba		
- * Club domestic league appearances and goals as of December 30, 2009

Solomon Oladele (born 19 May 1990) is a Nigerian football striker.

== Career ==
=== Early life ===
Known as Abula during his emergent days, he grew up in the Ikotun area of Lagos in Nigeria, where he played with FC Robo and Young Stars F.C.

=== Europe ===
Solomon began his career with Vejle Football Academy and moved from Nigeria to Denmark in 2008, when he joined Vejle with two other Nigerians, Joseph Akinola Folahan and Chidi Dauda Omeje. He went on 28 August 2008 to Serbia on trial, later on 2 September signed a professional contract with FK Jagodina. He played his first game for FK Jagodina in the Serbian SuperLiga on 10 December 2008 against FK Javor Ivanjica and scored his first goal. In the 2009-10 season he played on loan with FK Sinđelić Niš in the Serbian League East.

=== Swaziland ===
By September 2013 he has gained attention for his goalscoring performances while playing for Green Mamba F.C. in Swaziland Premier League.

In June 2015, after an excellent season with Red Lions in the Swazi Premier League, he was declared best striker in the league by The Swazi Observer.

== External sources ==
- Solomon Oladele at Srbijafudbal.
