= Boban Kajgo =

Canadian soccer player of Serbian origin (born 1989)

Bobby Kajgo
Personal information
- Full name: Boban Kajgo
- Date of birth: 10 March 1989 (age 37)
- Place of birth: Mostar, SFR Yugoslavia
- Height: 6 ft 1 in (1.85 m)
- Position: Midfielder

Youth career
- 2001–2003: ASJ Jean Talon
- 2003–2005: Concordia Montreal
- 2005–2007: OFK Beograd

Senior career*
| Years | Team | Apps | (Gls) |
| 2007–2009 | Hajduk Beograd | 44 | (4) |
| 2009 | Smederevo | 0 | (0) |
| 2010–2011 | Hajduk Beograd | 11 | (1) |
| 2011 | Leotar | 10 | (1) |
| 2012 | Sutjeska Foča | | |
| 2012–2013 | Balkan Mirijevo | 25 | (4) |
- * Club domestic league appearances and goals

Boban Kajgo (born March 10, 1989) is a Canadian retired soccer player of Serbian origin.

== Career ==
=== Youth ===
Kajgo began his career with ASJ Jean Talon and attended 2003 into the Concordia University. He played than from 2005 to 2007 in the youth side for OFK Belgrade.

=== Professional ===
In 2007 signed his first professional contract with FK Hajduk Beograd and earned in two years 37 games, who scores 5 goals. He left his club FK Hajduk Beograd to join on 14 July 2009 in the Serbian SuperLiga club FK Smederevo, signing a two-year contract.

In summer 2011 he joined FK Leotar in the Premier League of Bosnia and Herzegovina, but during the following winter break he moved to FK Sutjeska Foča playing in the First League of the Republika Srpska. During the summer of 2012, Kajgo returned to Belgrade and joined Balkan Mirijevo – a member of third tier of Serbian football.

== International career ==
He earned 8 games and scored 4 goals for the Quebec national trainings centre in 2004 and played for the team in 2007 at Coupe Du Québec Saputo AAA.
