= Igor Božić =

Bosnia and Herzegovina footballer

Personal information
- Full name: Igor Božić
- Date of birth: 14 July 1987 (age 39)
- Place of birth: Postojna, SFR Yugoslavia
- Height: 1.90 m (6 ft 3 in)
- Position: Goalkeeper

Senior career*
Years	Team	Apps	(Gls)
2006–2009	Rad Beograd	8	(0)
2007–2008	→ Železničar Beograd (loan)	8	(0)
2009	→ Pobeda (loan)	12	(0)
2010–2014	Proleter Teslić		
- * Club domestic league appearances and goals as of March 16, 2010

Igor Božić (Serbian Cyrillic: Игор Божић, Slovenian: Igor Božič, born 14 July 1987) is a Bosnian-Herzegovinian professional football goalkeeper who most recently played for FK Proleter Teslić in the First League of the Republika Srpska.

== Club career ==
Born in Postojna, nowadays in Slovenia, he played in the Serbian SuperLiga club FK Rad Belgrade between 2006 and 2009 with loan spells with FK Železničar Beograd in Serbian League Belgrade, and FK Pobeda in the Macedonian First League.

== External sources ==
- Profile at Srbijafudbal
