= Stefan Zogović =

Montenegrin footballer

Personal information
- Full name: Stefan Zogović
- Date of birth: 17 April 1990 (age 36)
- Place of birth: Nikšić, SFR Yugoslavia
- Height: 1.90 m (6 ft 3 in)
- Position: Defender

Team information
- Current team: Cement Beočin

Youth career
- Vojvodina

Senior career*
Years	Team	Apps	(Gls)
2008–2011	Vojvodina	0	(0)
2008–2009	→ Palić (loan)	13	(1)
2010	→ Palić (loan)	12	(0)
2011	→ Novi Sad (loan)	9	(0)
2011	→ Sutjeska Nikšić (loan)	17	(0)
2012–2013	Sutjeska Nikšić	27	(0)
2014	Donji Srem	0	(0)
2014–2017	Vojvodina	0	(0)
2014–2016	→ OFK Bačka (loan)	35	(3)
2016–2017	→ ČSK Čelarevo (loan)	2	(0)
2017–2018	OFK Odžaci	13	(0)
2018–	Cement Beočin	13	(0)
- * Club domestic league appearances and goals as of 16 February 2019

Stefan Zogović (Serbian Cyrillic: Стефан Зоговић; born 17 April 1990) is a Montenegrin football defender who plays for Cement Beočin.

== Club career ==
Born in Nikšić, Zogović came through Vojvodina youth academy. He made his first senior appearances with Palić making 13 appearances with 1 goal in the 2008–09 Serbian League Vojvodina season. Shortly after he signed a contract with Vojvodina, He joined Vojvodina's first team for the 2009–10 Serbian SuperLiga season, but did not make any official appearances for the club. Although he was originally loaned to Slavija Sarajevo in summer 2010, Zogović spent the 2010–11 season with Palić and FK Novi Sad. Zogović moved to Sutjeska Nikšić in 2011, and after a six-month period as a loaned player, he signed a two-year deal with the club at the beginning of 2012. Playing with Sutjeska, Zogović won the Montenegrin First League for the 2012–13 season. After the end of contract with Sutjeska, Zogović returned to the Serbian SuperLiga side Donji Srem, being a member of the club until summer 2014. In summer 2014, Zogović returned to his home club Vojvodina, but moved on loan to the nearby Serbian First League club OFK Bačka straight away. After a one-year loan, Zogović returned to Vojvodina, but after he was not in Zlatomir Zagorčić's plans for new season, Zogović extended his loan deal at OFK Bačka. For two seasons with Bačka, Zogović collected 35 caps and scored 3 goals, helping the team to join the Serbian SuperLiga for the first time in the club history. After the end of the 2015–16 season, Zogović left the club. In summer 2016, Zogović signed a one-year new contract with Vojvodina, and moved on loan to ČSK Čelarevo shortly after. Zogović injured in the second fixture of the 2016–17 Serbian First League season, being substituted out during the match against Sinđelić Beograd on 20 August 2016 and later missed the rest of a season.

== Style of play ==
As a 1.90 m tall defender, Zogović is physically dominant and powerful in the jump game. He usually operates as a centre-back being capable of playing as a right-back or as a midfielder in some occasions.

== Career statistics ==
As of 22 July 2017

Club	Season	League			Cup		Continental		Other		Total	
Club	Season	Division	Apps	Goals	Apps	Goals	Apps	Goals	Apps	Goals	Apps	Goals
Palić (loan)	2008–09	Serbian League Vojvodina	13	1	—		—		—		13	1
Palić (loan)	2010–11	Serbian League Vojvodina	12	0	—		—		—		12	0
Palić (loan)	Total		25	1	—		—		—		25	1
Novi Sad (loan)	2010–11	Serbian First League	9	0	—		—		—		9	0
Sutjeska Nikšić	2011–12	Montenegrin First League	32	0	—		—		—		32	0
Sutjeska Nikšić	2012–13	Montenegrin First League	12	0	—		—		—		12	0
Sutjeska Nikšić	2013–14	Montenegrin First League	0	0	1	0	0	0	—		1	0
Sutjeska Nikšić	Total		44	0	1	0	0	0	—		45	0
Donji Srem	2013–14	Serbian SuperLiga	0	0	—		—		—		0	0
OFK Bačka (loan)	2014–15	Serbian First League	23	3	—		—		—		23	3
OFK Bačka (loan)	2015–16	Serbian First League	12	0	0 (Note: As an unused substitution in the first round match against Red Star Belgrade)	0	—		—		12	0
OFK Bačka (loan)	Total		35	3	0	0	—		—		35	3
ČSK Čelarevo (loan)	2016–17	Serbian First League	2	0	—		—		—		2	0
OFK Odžaci	2017–18	Serbian League Vojvodina	13	0	—		—		—		13	0
Cement Beočin	2017–18	Serbian League Vojvodina	13	0	—		—		—		13	0
Career total			141	4	1	0	0	0	—		142	4

== Honours ==
Sutjeska Nikšić

- Montenegrin First League: 2012–13
