= Danijel Mihajlović =

Serbian footballer

Personal information
- Full name: Danijel Mihajlović
- Date of birth: 2 June 1985 (age 41)
- Place of birth: Varvarin, SFR Yugoslavia
- Height: 1.90 m (6 ft 3 in)
- Position: Centre-back

Youth career
- Temnić Lipa
- Red Star Belgrade

Senior career*
Years	Team	Apps	(Gls)
2003–2004	Spartak Ljig	4	(0)
2004–2007	Sopot	86	(9)
2007–2010	Jagodina	86	(5)
2010–2012	Red Star Belgrade	3	(0)
2012–2016	Jagodina	45	(1)
2016–20xx	Temnić	0	(0)
- * Club domestic league appearances and goals as of 27 January 2016

Danijel Mihajlović (Serbian Cyrillic: Данијел Михајловић; born 2 June 1985) is a Serbian retired footballer.

== Statistics ==
Club	Season	League		Cup		Europe		Other		Total	
Club	Season	Apps	Goals	Apps	Goals	Apps	Goals	Apps	Goals	Apps	Goals
Spartak Ljig	2003–04	4	0	0	0	0	0	0	0	4	0
Spartak Ljig	Total	4	0	0	0	0	0	0	0	4	0
Sopot	2004–05	22	2	0	0	0	0	0	0	22	2
Sopot	2005–06	34	2	0	0	0	0	0	0	34	2
Sopot	2006–07	30	5	0	0	0	0	0	0	30	5
Sopot	Total	86	9	0	0	0	0	0	0	86	9
Jagodina	2007–08	33	2	0	0	0	0	0	0	33	2
Jagodina	2008–09	27	2	0	0	0	0	0	0	27	2
Jagodina	2009–10	24	1	0	0	0	0	0	0	24	1
Jagodina	2010–11	2	0	0	0	0	0	0	0	2	0
Jagodina	Total	86	5	0	0	0	0	0	0	86	5
Red Star Belgrade	2010–11	3	0	1	0	0	0	0	0	4	0
Red Star Belgrade	Total	3	0	1	0	0	0	0	0	4	0
Jagodina	2012–13	7	0	3	0	0	0	0	0	10	0
Jagodina	2013–14	17	0	5	0	2	0	0	0	24	0
Jagodina	2014–15	21	1	3	0	1	0	0	0	25	1
Jagodina	2015–16	0	0	0	0	0	0	0	0	0	0
Jagodina	Total	45	1	11	0	3	0	0	0	59	1
Temnić	2015–16	0	0	0	0	0	0	0	0	0	0
Temnić	Total	0	0	0	0	0	0	0	0	0	0
Career total		224	15	12	0	3	0	0	0	239	15

Statistics accurate as of 4 May 2015

== Honours ==
Red Star

- Serbian Cup: 2012

Jagodina

- Serbian Cup: 2013
