= Marcelo Pletsch =

Brazilian footballer

Personal information
- Full name: Marcelo José Pletsch
- Date of birth: 13 May 1976 (age 50)
- Place of birth: Toledo, Brazil
- Height: 1.85 m (6 ft 1 in)
- Position: Defender

Senior career*
Years	Team	Apps	(Gls)
1998	Ceará	-	(-)
1999	Oliveira de Frades	-	(-)
1999–2005	Borussia Mönchengladbach	142	(3)
2005–2006	1. FC Kaiserslautern	22	(1)
2006–2008	Panionios	44	(6)
2008–2009	Omonia	36	(0)
2009–2010	Vojvodina	23	(1)
2011	Cascavel	5	(0)
Total		272	(11)
- * Club domestic league appearances and goals

Marcelo José Pletsch (born 13 May 1976) is a Brazilian former professional footballer who played as a defender.

== Career ==
In his homeland, Pletsch played with Ceará in the Campeonato Brasileiro Série B, before moving to Portuguese lower league club Oliveira de Frades.

In summer 1999, he moved to Germany signing with Borussia Mönchengladbach. At Mönchengladbach, he spent the first two seasons in the 2. Bundesliga before playing in the Bundesliga for the following four seasons. During the 2002–03 season, he gained notoriety for a "brutal" foul on Werder Bremen's Markus Daun who was forced out of action for half a year due to injuries sustained. In the second half of the 2004–05 season, he was suspended by the club after calling Mönchengladbach a "shitty club" and director of football Christian Hochstätter a "backstabber". During his six-year tenure at the club, Pletsch made a total of 142 league appearances and scored three goals.

Subsequently, Pletsch moved to 1. FC Kaiserslautern for the 2005–06 season. After a year of playing in Kaiserslautern, he left Germany and moved to Panionios of the Super League Greece. Pletsch made 44 league appearances and scored six goals for the club. In January 2008, he transferred to Cypriot side Omonia where he stayed for a year and a half, making 36 league appearances.

In July 2009, it was announced that Pletsch signed a one plus one-year contract for Serbian club Vojvodina. He left them at the end of the 2009–10 season.

In February 2011, Pletsch returned to Brazil after more than a decade to play with Cascavel in the Campeonato Paranaense.

== Personal life ==
In a May 2011 interview with German sports magazine 11 Freunde, Pletsch stated he was the owner of a pig farm.

In November 2015, he was arrested for drug trafficking after police had seized a truck carrying 793.3 kilograms (1,749 lb; 124 st 13 lb) of marijuana near his hometown Toledo. In October 2016, it was reported that he was sentenced to a prison term of nine years and two months by a court in Curitiba, with the judgment upheld on appeal.

== Career statistics ==
Club	Season	League			Cup		Europe		Total		Ref.
Club	Season	Division	Apps	Goals	Apps	Goals	Apps	Goals	Apps	Goals	Ref.
Borussia Mönchengladbach	1999–2000	2. Bundesliga	28	0	0	0	—		28	0	
Borussia Mönchengladbach	2000–01	2. Bundesliga	26	0	4	0	—		30	0	
Borussia Mönchengladbach	2001–02	Bundesliga	27	0	2	0	—		29	0	
Borussia Mönchengladbach	2002–03	Bundesliga	26	2	1	0	0	0	27	2	
Borussia Mönchengladbach	2003–04	Bundesliga	16	0	0	0	0	0	16	0	
Borussia Mönchengladbach	2004–05	Bundesliga	19	1	1	0	0	0	20	1	
Borussia Mönchengladbach	Total		142	3	8	0	0	0	150	3	–
1. FC Kaiserslautern	2005–06	Bundesliga	22	1	3	1	0	0	25	2	
Panionios	2006–07	Super League Greece	27	3	1	0	—		28	3	
Panionios	2007–08	Super League Greece	17	3	2	0	6	0	25	3	
Panionios	Total		44	6	3	0	6	0	53	6	–
Omonia	2007–08	Cypriot First Division	13	0			0	0	13	0	
Omonia	2008–09	Cypriot First Division	23	0			6	0	29	0	
Omonia	Total		36	0			6	0	42	0	–
Vojvodina	2009–10	Serbian SuperLiga	23	1	3	0	0	0	26	1	
Career total			267	11	17	1	12	0	296	12	–
