= Ivan Popović =

Serbian footballer

Personal information
- Full name: Ivan Popović
- Date of birth: 3 November 1979 (age 46)
- Place of birth: Belgrade, SFR Yugoslavia
- Height: 1.75 m (5 ft 9 in)
- Position: Left-back

Senior career*
Years	Team	Apps	(Gls)
1997–2002	Čukarički	51	(0)
2001	→ Komgrap (loan)	16	(0)
2002–2003	Radnički Obrenovac	31	(1)
2003–2005	Vojvodina	39	(0)
2005	Újpest	2	(0)
2005–2006	Obilić	23	(1)
2006–2008	Smederevo	41	(2)
2008–2010	Liberty Salonta		
2009–2010	→ Čukarički (loan)	21	(0)
2010–2013	Čukarički	68	(2)
- * Club domestic league appearances and goals

Ivan Popović (Serbian Cyrillic: Иван Поповић; born 3 November 1979) is a Serbian retired football defender.
