= Ivan Jovanović (footballer, born 1978) =

Serbian footballer

Ivan Jovanović Иван Јовановић
Personal information
- Full name: Ivan Jovanović
- Date of birth: 1 December 1978 (age 47)
- Place of birth: Leskovac, SFR Yugoslavia
- Height: 1.75 m (5 ft 9 in)
- Position: Midfielder

Youth career
- Dubočica

Senior career*
Years	Team	Apps	(Gls)
1996–1997	Dubočica	19	(10)
1997–2002	Rad	93	(12)
2003	Zemun	10	(3)
2003–2004	Obilić	35	(9)
2005	OFK Beograd	15	(3)
2005	Voždovac	17	(8)
2006	Shanghai Shenhua	20	(3)
2007	Lokeren	1	(0)
2007	Hapoel Be'er Sheva	4	(0)
2008	Rabotnički	10	(4)
2008–2009	Vardar	7	(0)
2009–2010	Smederevo	27	(3)
2010–2011	AEP Paphos	15	(1)
2011–2012	Borac Čačak	11	(1)
2012–2014	Sinđelić Beograd	54	(12)
Total		338	(69)
- * Club domestic league appearances and goals

Ivan "Guti" Jovanović (Serbian Cyrillic: Иван Гути Јовановић; born 1 December 1978) is a Serbian former professional footballer who played as a midfielder.

== Career ==
In the first half of the 2000s, Jovanović played for five Belgrade-based clubs in the First League of Serbia and Montenegro, spending the most time with Rad and Obilić. He also had a brief but successful spell at Voždovac, before transferring abroad to China (Shanghai Shenhua) in early 2006. In the second half of the 2000s, Jovanović went on to play in Belgium (Lokeren), Israel (Hapoel Be'er Sheva), and Macedonia (Rabotnički and Vardar), before returning to his homeland and joining Serbian SuperLiga side Smederevo.

In the summer of 2010, Jovanović moved abroad for the second time and joined Cypriot club AEP Paphos. He later played for Borac Čačak and Sinđelić Beograd, before hanging up his boots in 2014.

== Honours ==
Sinđelić Beograd

- Serbian League Belgrade: 2012–13
