= Zlatko Zečević =

Serbian footballer

Personal information
- Date of birth: 10 August 1983 (age 43)
- Place of birth: Kraljevo, SFR Yugoslavia
- Height: 1.92 m (6 ft 4 in)
- Position: Goalkeeper

Senior career*
Years	Team	Apps	(Gls)
2001–2006	OFK Beograd	15	(0)
2003	→ Njegoš Lovćenac (loan)	7	(0)
2004	→ ČSK Čelarevo (loan)	3	(0)
2005–2006	→ Mačva Šabac (loan)	44	(0)
2006–2007	Voždovac	3	(0)
2007	→ Sevojno (loan)	17	(0)
2007–2008	Sevojno	25	(0)
2008–2009	Banat Zrenjanin	26	(0)
2009–2010	Jagodina	20	(0)
2010–2011	APOP Kinyras	10	(0)
2011	Shkumbini	0	(0)
2012	Jedinstvo Užice	30	(0)
2013	Rabotnički	33	(0)
2014	OFK Beograd	13	(0)
2014–2016	Novi Pazar	44	(0)
2017–2021	Mladost Lučani	40	(0)
Total		330	(0)
- * Club domestic league appearances and goals as of 15 May 2021

Zlatko Zečević (Serbian Cyrillic: Златко Зечевић; born 10 August 1983) is a Serbian retired football goalkeeper. He is currently a goalkeeping coach at Apolon Kraljevo, coaching their youth teams.
