= Nenad Lazarevski =

Macedonian footballer

Personal information
- Full name: Nenad Lazarevski
- Date of birth: 3 July 1986 (age 40)
- Place of birth: Novi Sad, SFR Yugoslavia
- Height: 1.83 m (6 ft 0 in)
- Position: Right back

Youth career
- Novi Sad

Senior career*
Years	Team	Apps	(Gls)
2003–2005	Novi Sad	67	(2)
2006	Lokomotiv Moscow B	7	(1)
2006–2007	Slavia Sofia	11	(0)
2007–2008	Borac Čačak	16	(0)
2009–2011	OFK Beograd	4	(0)
2010–2011	→ Radnički Sombor (loan)	28	(3)
2011–2013	Novi Sad	19	(0)
2013	Inđija	4	(0)
2013–2016	Modriča		

International career^{‡}
2004–2005	Serbia and Montenegro U19	12	(4)
2007	Macedonia U21		
- * Club domestic league appearances and goals as of 11 May 2013 ‡ National team caps and goals as of 1 August 2012

Nenad Lazarevski (Serbian Cyrillic: Ненад Лазаревски; born 3 July 1986) is a Serbian and Macedonian football defender.

== Club career ==
Born in Novi Sad, SR Serbia, SFR Yugoslavia, Lazarevski started playing for FK Novi Sad. In early 2006, he moved to Russia and signed with Lokomotiv Moscow; although registered with the senior team, he played only for the reserves. After half a year, in the summer of 2006, he moved to Bulgaria where he played for PFC Slavia Sofia in the PFG A. In 2007, he returned to Serbia and joined SuperLiga side FK Borac Čačak.

In the summer of 2009 he signed with another SuperLiga side, OFK Beograd, but after a year was loaned to FK Radnički Sombor in the Serbian First League. Two years later he was released by OFK and he joined the club he had represented at the beginning of his career, RFK Novi Sad.

== International career ==
In 2004, he started playing for the Serbia and Montenegro under-19 team.

In 2007, he started representing the Macedonia under-21 team.
