= Miroslav Savanović =

Serbian footballer

Personal information
- Full name: Miroslav Savanović
- Date of birth: March 10, 1985 (age 41)
- Place of birth: Belgrade, Serbia
- Height: 1.83 m (6 ft 0 in)
- Position: Midfielder

Senior career*
Years	Team	Apps	(Gls)
2003–2007	Borac Čačak		
2008	Cham	15	(2)
2008–2009	Jagodina	0	(0)
2008–2009	→ Kolubara (loan)	16	(1)
2009–2011	Mladi Radnik	17	(0)
2011–2013	Drina Zvornik		
2013	Sileks	12	(0)
2013	Sheikh Russell		
2014	Dinamo Pančevo		
2015	Concordia Basel		
2015-2018	Aegeri		
2019-2020	Rotkreuz		
2020	Zug 94		
- * Club domestic league appearances and goals

Miroslav Savanović (Serbian Cyrillic: Мирослав Савановић; born 10 March 1985) is a Serbian retired footballer who played as an attacking midfielder.

He spent the latest years of his career at Swiss lower league sides Ägeri, Rotkreuz and Zug 94.
