= Vladimir Krnjinac =

Serbian footballer

Personal information
- Full name: Vladimir Krnjinac
- Date of birth: 20 February 1983 (age 43)
- Place of birth: Kruševac, SFR Yugoslavia
- Height: 1.76 m (5 ft 9 1/2 in)
- Position: Midfielder

Youth career
- Napredak Kruševac
- Obilić

Senior career*
Years	Team	Apps	(Gls)
2003–2004	Obilić	29	(0)
2005	Smederevo	12	(0)
2006–2008	Borac Čačak	80	(0)
2009–2010	Napredak Kruševac	27	(0)
2010–2012	Metalac Gornji Milanovac	40	(0)
2013	Mladost Lučani	3	(0)
2013–2014	Timok	13	(0)
2014–2015	Trstenik	23	(1)
2016	Omladinac Novi Banovci	12	(1)
2016–2017	Borac Sakule	23	(2)
2017–2018	OFK Beograd	13	(1)
- * Club domestic league appearances and goals as of 25 November 2017

Vladimir Krnjinac (Serbian Cyrillic: Владимир Крњинац; born 20 February 1983) is a Serbian retired footballer who last played as a midfielder for OFK Beograd. His father, Slavoljub, was also a footballer who played as a goalkeeper.

== Career ==
Krnjinac played for Obilić and Smederevo in the First League of Serbia and Montenegro, as well as for Napredak Kruševac and Metalac Gornji Milanovac in the Serbian SuperLiga. He also represented Borac Čačak in the 2008–09 UEFA Cup, recording six appearances in the process (including qualifiers).
