= Aleksandar Stojković =

Serbian footballer

Personal information
- Full name: Aleksandar Stojković
- Date of birth: 15 August 1990 (age 36)
- Place of birth: Sombor, SFR Yugoslavia
- Height: 1.82 m (5 ft 11 1/2 in)
- Position: Midfielder

Senior career*
Years	Team	Apps	(Gls)
2008	Mladost Apatin	26	(1)
2009–2012	Jagodina	30	(1)
2009–2010	→ Radnički Sombor (loan)	23	(1)
2011	→ Besëlidhja Lezhë (loan)	1	(0)
2012	Hajduk Kula	8	(0)
2013	Voždovac	15	(3)
2014	Metalac Gornji Milanovac	23	(5)
2015	Ermionida	5	(0)
2015–2016	Kolubara	22	(1)
2016–2018	Dinamo Vranje	59	(9)
2019–2020	Budućnost Dobanovci	34	(2)
2020–2021	Brodarac		
2021–2022	Hajduk Divoš		
2022	Borac Klenak		
2022	Kačer Belanovica		
- * Club domestic league appearances and goals as of 21 May 2023

Aleksandar Stojković (Serbian Cyrillic: Александар Стојковић; born 15 August 1990) is a Serbian football midfielder.
