= Zoran Zukić =

Serbian footballer

Personal information
- Full name: Zoran Zukić
- Date of birth: 6 June 1981 (age 45)
- Place of birth: Novi Sad, SFR Yugoslavia
- Height: 1.78 m (5 ft 10 in)
- Position: Striker

Senior career*
Years	Team	Apps	(Gls)
2001–2002	→ Tekstilac Odžaci (loan)		
2003–2007	Mladost Lučani	113	(56)
2007–2008	ČSK Čelarevo	7	(0)
2008	→ Dinamo Vranje (loan)		
2008–2009	Mladost Bački Jarak	21	(5)
2009–2010	Metalac Gornji Milanovac	3	(0)
2009–2010	→ Proleter Novi Sad (loan)	17	(4)
2010	Proleter Novi Sad	12	(0)
2011	Mladost Bački Jarak	27	(10)
2012–2014	Sloga Temerin	69	(21)
Total		149	(40)
- * Club domestic league appearances and goals as of 3 November 2014

Zoran Zukić (Serbian Cyrillic: Зоран Зукић; born 6 June 1981) is a Serbian retired football forward.
