= Vladimir Ribić =

Serbian footballer

Personal information
- Full name: Vladimir Ribić
- Date of birth: 28 March 1981 (age 45)
- Place of birth: Belgrade, SFR Yugoslavia
- Height: 1.84 m (6 ft 0 in)
- Position: Striker

Youth career
- Bežanija

Senior career*
Years	Team	Apps	(Gls)
2001–2003	Bežanija	63	(27)
2003–2004	Radnički Obrenovac	7	(1)
2004–2007	Arsenal Kyiv	18	(1)
2004	→ CSKA Kyiv	4	(0)
2004	→ Arsenal-2 Kyiv	2	(0)
2007–2008	Kairat	38	(3)
2009	Čukarički	10	(1)
2010	Tarbiat Yazd		
2010	Čukarički	6	(0)
2011	Chonburi		
- * Club domestic league appearances and goals

Vladimir Ribić (Serbian Cyrillic: Владимир Рибић; born 28 March 1981) is a Serbian retired footballer who played as a striker.

== Career ==
While playing for Bežanija, Ribić became the Serbian League Belgrade top scorer in the 2002–03 season with 21 goals in 30 appearances, helping the club win promotion back to the Second League of Serbia and Montenegro. He was subsequently transferred to First League of Serbia and Montenegro side Radnički Obrenovac for the 2003–04 season.

After moving abroad, Ribić totaled just 18 appearances and scored one goal for Arsenal Kyiv in the Ukrainian Premier League over the course of four seasons (2003–04 to 2006–07). He subsequently played with Kairat in the Kazakhstan Premier League for two seasons (2007 and 2008), making 38 appearances and scoring three goals.

== Honours ==
Bežanija

- Serbian League Belgrade: 2002–03
