= Vladimir Ilić =

Montenegrin footballer

Personal information
- Full name: Vladimir Ilić
- Date of birth: 23 March 1982 (age 44)
- Place of birth: Kotor, SFR Yugoslavia
- Height: 1.90 m (6 ft 3 in)
- Position: Centre-back

Senior career*
Years	Team	Apps	(Gls)
2001–2006	Takovo	57	(3)
2006–2010	Javor Ivanjica	61	(3)
2011–2015	Jagodina	77	(2)
- * Club domestic league appearances and goals as of 28 May 2015

Vladimir Ilić (Cyrillic: Bлaдимиp Илић; born 23 March 1982) is a Montenegrin football defender.

== Club career ==
Born in Kotor, SR Montenegro, SFR Yugoslavia, he begin his playing career with FK Takovo where he played until 2006 when he moved to FK Javor Ivanjica. After playing the first two seasons with Javor in the Serbian First League, the club achieved its promotion to the Serbian SuperLiga in 2008. After another two seasons with Javor, this time in the national top tier, he moved to another SuperLiga side, FK Jagodina in summer 2010.

== Honours ==
Javor

- Serbian First League: 2007–08

Jagodina

- Serbian Cup: 2013

== External sources ==
- Vladimir Ilić at Utakmica.rs (in Serbian)
