= Željko Đokić =

Bosnian footballer (born 1982)

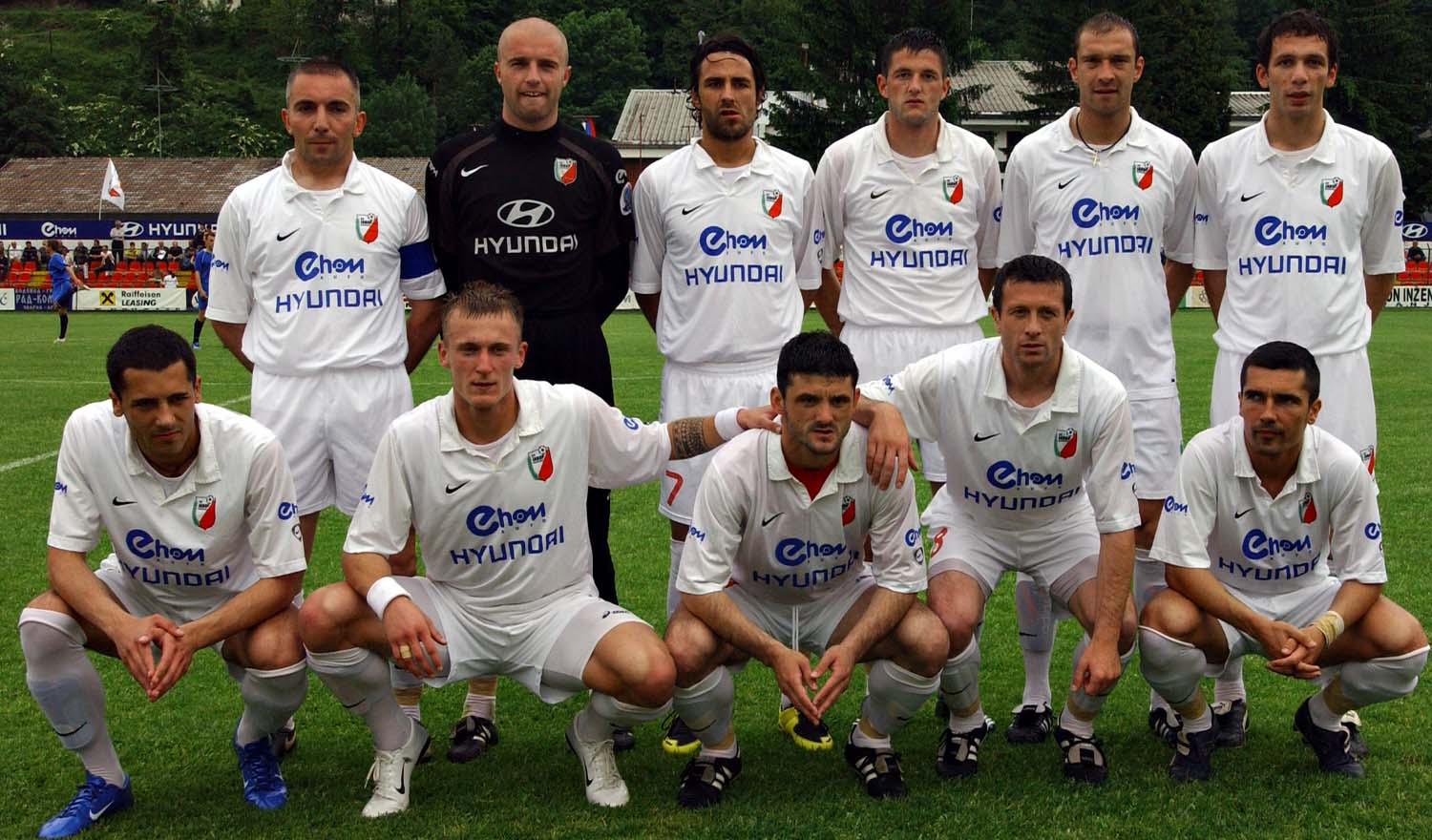
- Đokić (front row, second from left) with Javor Ivanjica in 2008

Personal information
- Date of birth: 10 May 1982 (age 44)
- Place of birth: Novi Sad, SFR Yugoslavia
- Height: 1.88 m (6 ft 2 in)
- Position: Centre-back

Senior career*
Years	Team	Apps	(Gls)
2001–2002	Srem Jakovo	16	(0)
2003–2006	Pobeda	27	(2)
2007	Srem Jakovo	13	(1)
2007–2009	Javor Ivanjica	60	(2)
2009–2010	Panthrakikos	20	(0)
2010	Javor Ivanjica	12	(0)
2011–2013	Ruch Chorzów	46	(1)
2013	Javor Ivanjica	10	(0)
2014	Wacker Innsbruck	31	(0)
2015	Novi Pazar	8	(0)
2016	Borac Banja Luka	8	(1)
2016–2017	Zemun	20	(1)
2018–2020	Brantford Galaxy		
- * Club domestic league appearances and goals

Željko Đokić (Serbian Cyrillic: Жељко Ђокић; also transliterated Željko Djokić; born 10 May 1982) is a Bosnian former professional footballer who played as a centre-back.

== Club career ==
Đokić played in the Second League of Serbia and Montenegro with FK Srem Jakovo in 2001. He played abroad in 2003 in the Macedonian First Football League with Pobeda. During his tenure with Pobeda he featured in the 2004–05 UEFA Champions League, and played against FC Pyunik. He also played in the 2006 UEFA Intertoto Cup against SSC Farul Constanța. In 2007, he played in the Serbian First League with Srem Jakovo, and Javor Ivanjica.

In 2009, he played abroad once more with Panthrakikos in the Super League Greece. He returned to Javor Ivanjica in 2010 to play in the Serbian SuperLiga. In 2011, he played in the Ekstraklasa with Ruch Chorzów. During his time with Ruch Chorzów he played in the 2012–13 UEFA Europa League against FK Metalurg Skopje, and FC Viktoria Plzeň. After a brief stint with Javor Ivanjica he was playing abroad once more in the Austrian Football Bundesliga with FC Wacker Innsbruck in 2014.

In 2015, he returned to the Serbian Superliga to play with FK Novi Pazar, and later in the Premier League of Bosnia and Herzegovina with FK Borac Banja Luka. In 2016, he returned to the Serbian First League with FK Zemun. He played in abroad for the fifth time in 2018 to play in the Canadian Soccer League with Brantford Galaxy.

== International career ==
He has played for Bosnia and Herzegovina B team.
