= Gerardo Vonder =

Uruguayan footballer (born 1988)

Gerardo Vonder Putten
Personal information
- Full name: Gerardo Sebastián Vonder; Pütten Gabachuto
- Date of birth: 28 February 1988 (age 38)
- Place of birth: Montevideo, Uruguay
- Height: 1.76 m (5 ft 9 in)
- Position: Attacking midfielder

Youth career
- Danubio

Senior career*
Years	Team	Apps	(Gls)
2006–2008	Danubio	12	(0)
2009	Central Español	3	(0)
2009	Javor Ivanjica	0	(0)
2010	Cobreloa	9	(0)
2010	Guaraní	2	(2)
2011	Deportes Quindío	7	(0)
2011–2012	CS Visé	13	(0)
2012	Boston River	0	(0)
2013	Unión Comercio	38	(5)
2014	Los Caimanes	15	(0)
2015	Alianza Petrolera	7	(1)
2015–2016	Torque	1	(1)
2016	Los Caimanes	9	(0)
2017	CF Sant Rafel	0	(0)
2018	Marquense	10	(1)
2018	Sport Rosario	4	(0)
2020	PE Sant Jordi	–	(–)

International career
- Uruguay U15
2003–2004	Uruguay U16		
2004–2005	Uruguay U17	3	(0)
2006–2007	Uruguay U20	3	(0)
- * Club domestic league appearances and goals

Gerardo Sebastián Vonder Pütten Gabachuto better known simply as Gerardo Vonder (born 28 February 1988) is an Uruguayan professional football midfielder who last played with Sport Rosario in Peru.

Born in capital Montevideo, he played with Uruguayan clubs Danubio Fútbol Club and Central Español before having a brief first spell in Europe with Serbian club FK Javor Ivanjica where because of health reasons has failed to make an impact. Afterwards he played with Chilean club Cobreloa and Club Guaraní from Paraguay. He still played the first half of 2011 with Deportes Quindío in Colombia, before moving in summer 2011 for second time to Europe, this time to play in Belgium with C.S. Visé. In 2013, he joined Peruvian club Unión Comercio.

His last club was PE Sant Jordi. Vonder Putten announced his retirement in July 2021.

== National team ==
After playing with the Uruguayan U-15 team, he has represented Uruaguay at the 2004 South American Under-16 Football Championship in Paraguay. Also on continental level, he has won the silver at the 2005 South American Under-17 Football Championship and the bronze at the 2007 South American Youth Championship.

He was part of the Uruguayan team at the 2005 FIFA U-17 World Championship, and Uruguay U20 team in the 2007 FIFA U-20 World Cup where they reached the round of 16.

== Honours ==
Danubio

- Uruguayan Championship: 2006–07

Guaraní

- Paraguayan Primera División: 2010 Apertura champion

Uruguay U-17

- South American Under-17 Football Championship: 2005 (2nd - Silver)

Uruguay U-20

- South American Youth Championship: 2007 (3rd - Bronze)

== External sources ==
- Gerardo Vonder at WorldFootball.net
- Gerardo Vonder at Tenfieldigital. (in Spanish)
- Gerardo Vonder at Soccerway (archived)
