= Miloš Živković (footballer, born 1985) =

Serbian footballer

Personal information
- Full name: Miloš R. Živković
- Date of birth: 5 February 1985 (age 41)
- Place of birth: Belgrade, SFR Yugoslavia
- Height: 1.86 m (6 ft 1 in)
- Position: Defender

Youth career
- Bežanija
- 2001–2003: Red Star Belgrade

Senior career*
Years	Team	Apps	(Gls)
2003–2005	Red Star Belgrade	1	(0)
2003	→ Javor Ivanjica (loan)	3	(0)
2004	→ Mladost Lukićevo (loan)	10	(0)
2004–2005	→ Železničar Smederevo (loan)	32	(1)
2005–2006	Mladenovac	26	(0)
2006–2007	Hajduk Kula	4	(0)
2007–2008	Borac Čačak	9	(0)
2008–2009	Tavriya Simferopol	0	(0)
2009–2010	Jagodina	4	(0)
2010–2011	Hajduk Kula	0	(0)
2010–2011	→ Zemun (loan)	2	(0)
2011–2013	Zemun	38	(0)
2013–2014	Sopot	11	(0)
Total		140	(1)
- * Club domestic league appearances and goals as of 16 July 2014

Miloš Živković (Serbian Cyrillic: Милош Живковић; born 5 February 1985) is a Serbian football player.

== Career ==
He starter his career in Belgrade club FK Bežanija youth teams. With the age of 13, he moved to Red Star Belgrade youth football team. He played also for Serbia young national team. Since 2003, he started to play as senior, being loaned to FK Javor, Mladost Lukićevo and FK Železničar Smederevo. After playing one season with OFK Mladenovac, in 2006 he signed with Hajduk Kula making his Serbian Superliga debut. Next season he moved to another top-league club, Borac Čačak, which had what was one of their best years finishing in fourth place, just behind the biggest Serbian clubs. At the end of the season he moved to Tavriya Simferopol, where he stayed one season, returning afterwards to Serbia, this time to play in FK Jagodina.
