= Saša Mišić (footballer) =

Serbian footballer (born 1987)

Personal information
- Full name: Saša Mišić
- Date of birth: 24 August 1987 (age 39)
- Place of birth: Valjevo, SFR Yugoslavia
- Height: 1.88 m (6 ft 2 in)
- Position: Goalkeeper

Youth career
- Jedinstvo Ub
- 2001–2004: Partizan

Senior career*
Years	Team	Apps	(Gls)
2005–2007	Zemun	9	(0)
2005	→ Kolubara (loan)	15	(0)
2006–2007	→ Posavac (loan)	43	(0)
2008	Radnički Pirot	15	(0)
2008	Radnički Kragujevac	2	(0)
2009	Čukarički	0	(0)
2009–2010	Berane	13	(0)
2010–2012	Metalac Gornji Milanovac	5	(0)
2012	→ Mladenovac (loan)	5	(0)
2013	Jedinstvo Putevi	28	(0)
2014	Javor Ivanjica	11	(0)
2014	Mladost Velika Obarska	14	(0)
2015	Sloboda Užice	0	(0)
2015	Bežanija	0	(0)
2016–2019	Borac Čačak	57	(0)
Total		217	(0)
- * Club domestic league appearances and goals as of 5 May 2019

Saša Mišić (Serbian Cyrillic: Саша Мишић; born 24 August 1987) is a Serbian retired football goalkeeper who played for Borac Čačak.

== Career ==
Born in Valjevo, Mišić passed FK Partizan youth school. Next he joined Zemun, where he played between 2005 and 2007 but was loaned to lower ranked league clubs Kolubara and Posavac in the meantime. Later he was with Radnički Pirot, Radnički Kragujevac, and Čukarički. He also spent season and a half under contract with Metalac Gornji Milanovac and was loaned to OFK Mladenovac during the time. After solid 2013 year spent with Jedinstvo Putevi, Mišić joined Javor Ivanjica at the beginning of 2014, but he left the club after 6 months and spent the rest of a year with Mladost Velika Obarska. He was also with Sloboda Užice and Bežanija before he joined Borac Čačak in 2016.
