= Vojvodina League West =

- Founded: 2004
- Folded: 2014
- Country: Serbia
- Number of clubs: 16
- Level on pyramid: 4
- Promotion to: Serbian League Vojvodina
- Relegation to: PFL Sombor; PFL Novi Sad; PFL Sremska Mitrovica
- Domestic cup: Serbian Cup
- Last champions: PIK Prigrevica (2013–14)

Vojvodina League West (Serbian: Vojvođanska liga "Zapad") was part of the Serbian Zone Leagues, the fourth tier of Serbian football. The league was organized by the Football Association of Vojvodina.

Vojvodina League West consisted of 16 clubs from West Bačka District, South Bačka District, and Srem District. Teams competed in a double round-robin league format, playing each other both home and away. At the end of each season, the top club was promoted to Serbian League Vojvodina. The second-placed team faced the runner-up from the Vojvodina League East in a two-legged play-off, with the aggregate winner securing a spot in the Serbian League Vojvodina.

After the 2013–14 season, the Vojvodina League West was a replaced with Bačka Zone League and Novi Sad-Srem Zone League.

== Champions history ==
Seasons	Nb. Clubs.	Champions	Points	Runners up	Points
2004–05	16	Sloga, Temerin	69	OFK Futog, Futog	68
2005–06	16	OFK Futog, Futog	64	Proleter, Novi Sad	57
2006–07	16	Mladost, Bački Jarak	65	Slavija, Novi Sad	58
2007–08	16	Metalac, Futog	61	Mladost, Turija	55
2008–09	18	Veternik, Veternik	79	Donji Srem, Pećinci	75
2009–10	18	Solunac, Rastina	73	Cement, Beočin	71
2010–11	16	Dunav, Stari Banovci	66	Borac, Novi Sad	64
2011–12	16	Radnički, Sremska Mitrovica	58	Jedinstvo, Stara Pazova	57
2012–13	16	OFK Bačka, Bačka Palanka	64	Indeks, Novi Sad	57
2013–14	16	PIK, Prigrevica	65	Cement, Beočin	55

== See also ==
- Serbia national football team
- Serbian Superliga
- Serbian First League
- Serbian League
- Serbian Zone League
