= Đorđe Ivanović =

Serbian footballer (born 1995)

Personal information
- Date of birth: 20 November 1995 (age 30)
- Place of birth: Vukovar, Croatia
- Height: 1.79 m (5 ft 10 in)
- Position: Left winger

Team information
- Current team: AEK Larnaca
- Number: 9

Youth career
- OFK Kikinda
- 2009–2012: Spartak Subotica

Senior career*
Years	Team	Apps	(Gls)
2013–2018	Spartak Subotica	101	(27)
2013	→ Bačka 1901 (loan)	(Note: Including Serbian League Vojvodina appearances only)13	(3)
2014	→ Palić (loan)	11	(0)
2014–2015	→ Senta (loan)	17	(7)
2018–2020	Partizan	52	(12)
2020–2021	Olimpija Ljubljana	34	(11)
2021–2022	Shakhtyor Soligorsk	11	(2)
2022	→ Maribor (loan)	16	(4)
2022–2025	Čukarički	99	(18)
2025–	AEK Larnaca	40	(10)

International career
2017	Serbia	1	(0)
- * Club domestic league appearances and goals as of 17:25, 19 October 2026 (UTC)

Đorđe Ivanović (Serbian Cyrillic: Ђорђе Ивановић, pronounced [dʑôːrdʑe ǐʋanoʋitɕ]; born 20 November 1995) is a Serbian professional footballer who plays for AEK Larnaca.

== Club career ==
=== Spartak Subotica ===
==== Early years and loan spells ====
After moving to Serbia from Croatia, Ivanović played with OFK Kikinda. Later he moved to Spartak Subotica youth academy at the age of 14, where stayed as a regular member until the end of 2012. At the beginning of 2013, Ivanović moved on loan to the Vojvodina League East side Bačka 1901. Beating Indeks Novi Sad in barrage match of the 2012–13 campaign, Ivanović continued playing with the club until the end of 2013. As a member of Bačka 1901, Ivanović scored 3 goals in 13 matches in the Serbian League Vojvodina, being also nominated for a man of the match against Palić when he scored a brace. In the meantime, he signed scholarship contract with Spartak in summer 2013. In early 2014, Ivanović was also with Palić, after which he moved to Senta on one-year dual registration. Ivanović collected 17 appearances for Senta in the 2014–15 Serbian League Vojvodina campaign, and also scored 7 goals.

==== 2014–15 season: First team breakthrough ====
At the beginning of 2015, Ivanović returned to Spartak Subotica, passing the winter break off-season with the first team. Ivanović made his Serbian SuperLiga debut under coach Petar Kurćubić, playing a full-time away game against Radnički Kragujevac on 21 February 2015. He scored his first goal for the team several days later in the next fixture match played on 28 February 2015, for 1–0 victory over OFK Beograd. He also scored a twice in a 3–2 away defeat versus Mladost Lučani in 18th week of the season. During the spring half-season, Ivanović noted 3 assists, including twice to Nemanja Milić for 3–1 away win against Jagodina and a single pass to Andrej Mrkela in the last fixture match against Čukarički. Ivanović collected all 15 league appearances until the end of a season with average rating 6.70.

==== 2015–16 season: Turning fully professional ====
In summer 2015, Ivanović signed his first three-year professional contract with the club along with teammates Marko Jondić and Branimir Jočić, taking number 10 jersey after Milorad Balabanović left the club. He started the 2015–16 season under coach Stevan Mojsilović as the first choice in attack, having the whole matches played in opening 7 weeks in the Serbian SuperLiga. After a period without a goal in official games, Ivanović missed several matches until November 2015, making a single league appearance as a substitution for Maxim Fedin in a second half of a match against OFK Beograd, as also the Serbian Cup appearance against Zemun. Next the Mojsilović left the club, Ivanović returned to the squad under Russian manager Andrey Chernyshov. He scored his first season goal in the 21st fixture match against Novi Pazar. In the rest of a regular season, he was mostly used as a back-up choice. At the beginning of play-off season, Ivanović scored in away match against Javor Ivanjica. Later he also scored in a match against Metalac Gornji Milanovac when he also had an assist, and against Jagodina when scored a twice. Finally, he made an assist to Stefan Milošević in the last fixture match against Rad.

==== 2016–17 season: Playmaker ====
Next the club kept the place in the top tier of Serbian football pyramid, coach Chernyshov involved Ivanović in the first squad for new season. At the beginning of the 2016–17 campaign, Ivanović was mostly used as a left wing forward. Later, during the season, he also played on right side or as a second striker. He scored his first goal in second fixture match of the season, against Radnički Niš. Later he also scored 2 league goals until the end of first half-season in matches against Čukarički and Novi Pazar and his first Serbian Cup goal for Spartak, in a match against OFK Bačka. During the spring half-season, Ivanović scored the only goal in 2–1 defeat against Red Star Belgrade, and in victories over Metalac, Čukarički and OFK Bačka in the last fixture match, when scored a twice at the Subotica City Stadium. Previously, in April 2017, Ivanović extended his contract with the club until summer 2019.

==== 2017–18 season: Leadership and captaincy ====
In summer 2017, Ivanović started the new season as team captain under new coach Aleksandar Veselinović in front of the club captain Vladimir Torbica who has been mostly used as a back-up choice. He scored his first season goal in away match against Borac Čačak, and later also noted a goal from a penalty kick in the game versus Mačva Šabac. After he scored a twice in 5–0 away victory over Vojvodina at the Karađorđe Stadium, Ivanović has been connected with Sparta Prague and Vardar. Ivanović also scored both goals in the next fixture match against Napredak Kruševac, after which he was named as a player of the week in the Serbian SuperLiga.

Scoring 11 goals and making 5 assists at total, Ivanović was elected for the most valuable player in the first half-season of the 2017–18 Serbian SuperLiga campaign in December 2017. He was also awarded as the best player of Spartak Subotica in 2017.

=== Partizan ===
After multi-day negotiations, Spartak agreed on terms, which Ivanović confirmed on 23 January 2018. He was officially revealed as Partizan player on the same day, when he signed a four-year contract, taking number 18 jersey. The transfer fee was reported as €400,000 plus 20 percent of the future transfer. Ivanović made his official debut for Partizan in the first leg of the 2017–18 UEFA Europa League knockout phase, replacing Seydouba Soumah in the 71st minute of the match against Viktoria Plzeň on 15 February 2018. On 26 April 2018, Ivanović scored twice and made an assist in a 3–1 victory over Radnički Niš, after which he was elected for a player of the week in the Serbian SuperLiga. Ivanović won his first trophy with Partizan after their 2–1 victory over Mladost Lučani in the 2017–18 Serbian Cup final on 23 May 2018.

On 9 October 2019, Ivanović scored five goals in Partizan's 6–0 Serbian Cup win against Vodojaža.

== International career ==
Eligible to play for Serbia and Croatia, Ivanović has been invited to the Serbia national football team by caretaker Mladen Krstajić for an Asian tour in November 2017. He made his debut for the team in friendly draw to South Korea on 14 November 2017, replacing Adem Ljajić in 90 minute of the match.

== Playing style ==
Ivanović mainly operates as a forward, being capable of playing on all attacking positions. In early years with Spartak, he was mostly used as a centre forward, with possibility to play on both wings, or as a second striker. Next he has got more creative role under Andrey Chernyshov in some matches, having played as an attacking midfielder with a "chasing back" ability, although he was usually starting matches as a side player. At the age of 21, Ivanović figured as one of the most productive players in Serbian domestic competition. During the 2017–18 SuperLiga campaign, Aleksandar Veselinović adapted Ivanović as a second striker, pairing him with more offensive Nemanja Nikolić.

== Personal life ==
Ivanović, an ethnic Serb, was born in Vukovar eight days after the Erdut Agreement was signed. He left his place of birth with his family and moved to Mokrin at the age of 2. After his parents lost their jobs in a foundry, he has taken care of his family since he started playing football professionally. His older brother Dejan is also a footballer.

== Career statistics ==
=== Club ===
As of 20 May 2026

Appearances and goals by club, season and competition
Club	Season	League			National cup		Continental		Other		Total	
Club	Season	Division	Apps	Goals	Apps	Goals	Apps	Goals	Apps	Goals	Apps	Goals
Bačka 1901 (loan)	2013–14	Serbian League Vojvodina	13	3	—		—		—		13	3
Palić (loan)	2013–14	Serbian League Vojvodina	11	0	—		—		—		11	0
Senta (loan)	2014–15	Serbian League Vojvodina	17	7	—		—		—		17	7
Spartak Subotica	2014–15	Serbian SuperLiga	15	3	—		—		—		15	3
Spartak Subotica	2015–16	Serbian SuperLiga	30	5	3	0	—		—		33	5
Spartak Subotica	2016–17	Serbian SuperLiga	35	8	2	1	—		—		37	9
Spartak Subotica	2017–18	Serbian SuperLiga	21	11	0	0	—		—		21	11
Spartak Subotica	Total		101	27	5	1	—		—		106	28
Partizan	2017–18	Serbian SuperLiga	12	2	3	0	1 (Note: Appearances in UEFA Europa League)	0	—		16	2
Partizan	2018–19	Serbian SuperLiga	20	7	3	0	5	0	—		28	7
Partizan	2019–20	Serbian SuperLiga	15	3	2	5	4	0	—		21	8
Partizan	2020–21	Serbian SuperLiga	5	0	0	0	0	0	—		5	0
Partizan	Total		52	12	8	5	10	0	—		70	17
Olimpija Ljubljana	2020–21	Slovenian PrvaLiga	34	11	4	1	1	1	—		39	13
Shakhtyor Soligorsk	2021	Belarusian Premier League	11	2	1	0	4 (Note: Two appearances in UEFA Champions League, two appearances in UEFA Europa Conference League)	0	—		16	2
Maribor (loan)	2021–22	Slovenian PrvaLiga	16	4	0	0	—		—		16	4
Čukarički	2022–23	Serbian SuperLiga	35	9	4	1	4	1	—		43	11
Čukarički	2023–24	Serbian SuperLiga	34	6	3	2	8	1	—		45	9
Čukarički	2024–25	Serbian SuperLiga	30	3	1	0	—		—		31	3
Čukarički	Total		119	18	8	3	12	1	—		119	23
AEK Larnaca	2025–26	Cypriot First Division	34	8	1	0	15	2	1	0	51	10
Career total			389	92	27	10	41	4	1	0	458	107

=== International ===
As of 14 November 2017

Appearances and goals by national team and year
National team	Year	Apps	Goals
Serbia
Serbia	2017	1	0
Total		1	0

== Honours ==
=== Club ===
Partizan

- Serbian Cup: 2017–18, 2018–19

Olimpija Ljubljana

- Slovenian Cup: 2020–21

Shakhtyor Soligorsk

- Belarusian Premier League: 2021

Maribor

- Slovenian PrvaLiga: 2021–22

=== Individual ===
- The most valuable player of the Serbian SuperLiga: 2017–18 (mid-season)
- Spartak Subotica Player of the Year: 2017
- Dnevnik newspaper Player of the Season: 2020–21
- Serbian SuperLiga Player of the Week: 2022–23 (Round 30), 2023–24 (Round 30)
