= Stefan Radoja =

Serbian footballer

Personal information
- Full name: Stefan Radoja
- Date of birth: 28 November 1990 (age 35)
- Place of birth: Novi Sad, SFR Yugoslavia
- Height: 1.84 m (6 ft 0 in)
- Position: Defensive midfielder

Senior career*
Years	Team	Apps	(Gls)
2008–2009	ČSK Čelarevo	0	(0)
2009–2012	Mladost Bački Jarak	86	(11)
2012–2013	Novi Sad	11	(0)
2013–2014	OFK Bačka	26	(1)
2015	Kecskemét	7	(0)
2015–2016	OFK Bačka	10	(1)
- * Club domestic league appearances and goals as of 31 August 2016

Stefan Radoja (Serbian Cyrillic: Стефан Радоја; born 28 November 1990) is a Serbian former football midfielder. He is an older brother of Nemanja Radoja.

== Career ==
Born in Novi Sad, Radoja was with ČSK Čelarevo in 2008–09 season, but he made his first senior appearances with Mladost Bački Jarak, where he spent next three seasons. After one season with Novi Sad, Radoja moved to OFK Bačka. In the beginning of 2015, he joined Kecskemét, but he returned to Bačka after 6 months. In summer 2016, he made his own decision to end his football career, but rumors says that he had a cardiac problem.

== Career statistics ==
As of 20 June 2016

Club performance			League		Cup		Continental		Total	
Season	Club	League	Apps	Goals	Apps	Goals	Apps	Goals	Apps	Goals
Season	Serbia		League		Serbian Cup		Europe		Total	
2009–10	Mladost Bački Jarak	Serbian League Vojvodina	28	1	–				28	1
2010–11	Mladost Bački Jarak	Serbian League Vojvodina	29	0	–				29	0
2011–12	Mladost Bački Jarak	Serbian League Vojvodina	29	10	–				29	10
2012–13	Novi Sad	Serbian First League	11	0	–				11	0
2013–14	OFK Bačka	Serbian League Vojvodina	11	1	–				11	1
2014–15	OFK Bačka	Serbian First League	15	0	–				15	0
Hungary			League		Magyar Kupa		Europe		Total	
2014–15	Kecskemét	Nemzeti Bajnokság I	7	0	–				7	0
Serbia			League		Serbian Cup		Europe		Total	
2015–16	OFK Bačka	Serbian First League	10	1	0	0	–		10	1
Total	Serbia		133	13	0	0	0	0	133	13
Total	Hungary		7	0	0	0	0	0	7	0
Career total			140	13	0	0	0	0	140	13
