= Marko Zečević =

Serbian footballer

Personal information
- Full name: Marko Zečević
- Date of birth: 6 August 1990 (age 36)
- Place of birth: Novi Sad, SFR Yugoslavia
- Height: 1.89 m (6 ft 2 in)
- Position: Centre forward

Team information
- Current team: Hajduk Beška

Youth career
- Ajax Novi Sad

Senior career*
Years	Team	Apps	(Gls)
2008–2013	Novi Sad	20	(0)
2009–2010	→ Crvena Zvezda NS (loan)		
2013–2015	Bačka Palanka	47	(21)
2015–2017	Javor Ivanjica	29	(0)
2016–2017	→ Bačka Palanka (loan)	22	(0)
2017–2018	Bačka Palanka	1	(0)
2019–2021	Feniks 1995 Stara Pazova	25	(17)
2022	Mladost Bački Jarak		
2023-	Hajduk Beška		
- * Club domestic league appearances and goals as of 15 January 2021

Marko Zečević (Serbian Cyrillic: Марко Зечевић; born 6 August 1990) is a Serbian football forward.

== Club career ==
Born in Novi Sad, Zečević was a member of FK Novi Sad from 2008 to 2013, and made 20 Serbian First League appearances. In the meantime, he was loaned to Crvena Zvezda Novi Sad.

Zečević joined OFK Bačka for 2013–14 season. For two seasons playing for this club, he made 47 appearances and scored 21 goals. First season playing for OFK Bačka, Zečević ended with 26 caps and 10 goals in the Serbian League Vojvodina. For the 2014–15 season, Zečević played with OFK Bačka in the Serbian First League, and was also a vice-captain, after Veseljko Trivunović. Zečević made 21 appearances and was the best scorer of team with 11 goals, including 5 goals in 2 matches against Sloga Kraljevo, and was also declared as the man of the match against Sloga Petrovac na Mlavi when he scored 2 goals for away win. Other 4 goals he scored in matches against Bežanija, Proleter Novi Sad, Javor Ivanjica, and Metalac Gornji Milanovac.

In summer of 2015, Zečević joined Javor Ivanjica.

Zečević returned to OFK Bačka on one-year loan for the 2016–17 season, after the club promoted in the Serbian SuperLiga.

== Career statistics ==
=== Club ===
As of 17 June 2017

Club performance			League		Cup		Continental		Total	
Season	Club	League	Apps	Goals	Apps	Goals	Apps	Goals	Apps	Goals
2010–11	Novi Sad	Serbian League Vojvodina	4	0	—		—		4	0
2011–12	Novi Sad	Serbian League Vojvodina	8	0	—		—		8	0
2012–13	Novi Sad	Serbian League Vojvodina	8	0	—		—		8	0
2013–14	OFK Bačka	Serbian League Vojvodina	26	10	—		—		26	10
2014–15	OFK Bačka	Serbian First League	21	11	—		—		21	11
2015–16	Javor Ivanjica	Serbian SuperLiga	29	0	5	0	—		34	0
2016–17	OFK Bačka (loan)	Serbian SuperLiga	22	0	1	0	—		23	0
Career total			118	21	6	0	—		124	21

== Honours ==
Bačka

- Serbian League Vojvodina: 2013–14
