= Siniša Babić =

Serbian footballer

Personal information
- Date of birth: 13 February 1991 (age 35)
- Place of birth: Novi Sad, SFR Yugoslavia
- Height: 1.78 m (5 ft 10 in)
- Positions: Winger; second striker

Team information
- Current team: Mladost Novi Sad
- Number: 33

Youth career
- Vojvodina

Senior career*
Years	Team	Apps	(Gls)
2009–2011	Vojvodina	0	(0)
2009–2010	→ Palić (loan)	12	(1)
2011–2012	→ Veternik (loan)	27	(8)
2010	Veternik	21	(11)
2012–2015	Proleter Novi Sad	68	(9)
2015–2017	Vojvodina	50	(6)
2017	AEL	1	(0)
2018	Radnički Niš	19	(6)
2019	Krupa	10	(2)
2019–2021	Proleter Novi Sad	34	(10)
2021	Turon Yaypan	13	(0)
2022	Radnik Surdulica	28	(2)
2023	Al-Nasr Benghazi		
2023	Napredak	9	(0)
2024-	Mladost Novi Sad	1	(0)
- * Club domestic league appearances and goals as of 27 December 2023

Siniša Babić (Serbian Cyrillic: Синиша Бабић; born 13 February 1991) is a Serbian professional footballer who plays as a forward for Mladost Novi Sad.

== Club career ==
Born in Novi Sad, Babić is a product of Vojvodina's youth school. After youth career, he was loaned to Palić, and Veternik. After one season as a loaned player, he was brought from Vojvodina and continued playing for Veternik. Later he played for Proleter Novi Sad next three seasons. He returned in Vojvodina in summer 2015. On 23 August 2017, Babić signed a contract with Super League Greece club AEL for an undisclosed fee. At the beginning of 2018, Babić signed with Radnički Niš.

== Career statistics ==
As of match played 16 January 2019

Appearances and goals by club, season and competition
Club	Season	League			Cup		Continental		Total	
Club	Season	Division	Apps	Goals	Apps	Goals	Apps	Goals	Apps	Goals
Palić	2009–10	Serbian League Vojvodina	12	1	0	0	—		12	1
Veternik	2010–11	Serbian League Vojvodina	27	8	0	0	—		27	8
Veternik	2011–12	Serbian League Vojvodina	21	11	0	0	—		21	11
Veternik	Total		48	19	0	0	0	0	48	19
Proleter	2012–13	Serbian First League	28	3	1	0	—		29	3
Proleter	2013–14	Serbian First League	22	3	1	0	—		23	3
Proleter	2014–15	Serbian First League	18	3	0	0	—		18	3
Proleter	Total		68	9	2	0	0	0	70	9
Vojvodina	2015–16	Serbian SuperLiga	29	4	2	2	6 (Note: Appearances in the Europa League)	0	37	6
Vojvodina	2016–17	Serbian SuperLiga	21	2	5	1	7	2	33	5
Vojvodina	Total		50	6	7	3	13	2	70	11
AEL	2017–18	Super League Greece	1	0	1	0	—		2	0
AEL	Total		1	0	1	0	0	0	2	0
Radnički Niš	2017–18	Serbian SuperLiga	13	4	—		—		13	4
Radnički Niš	2018–19	Serbian SuperLiga	6	2	1	0	0	0	7	2
Career total			200	41	11	3	13	2	224	46

== Honours ==
Individual

- Serbian SuperLiga Player of the Week: 2020–21 (round 8), 2021–22 (round 27)
