= Nenad Mitrović (footballer, born 1998) =

Serbian footballer

Personal information
- Full name: Nenad Mitrović
- Date of birth: 31 May 1998 (age 28)
- Place of birth: Novi Sad, FR Yugoslavia
- Height: 1.92 m (6 ft 3 1/2 in)
- Position: Goalkeeper

Youth career
- Bačka Palanka

Senior career*
Years	Team	Apps	(Gls)
2014–2018	Bačka Palanka	1	(0)
2015–2016	→ Budućnost Gložan (loan)	25	(0)
2017	→ Žarkovo (loan)	2	(0)
2017–2018	→ Radnički Šid (loan)	22	(0)
2018–2019	ČSK Čelarevo		
2019–2020	Fomat Martin		
2020–2021	Bačka Palanka		
2020–2021	→ OFK Stari Grad (loan)		
2021–2023	HNK Fruškogorac		
2023–	Budućnost Mladenovo		
- * Club domestic league appearances and goals as of 7 June 2018

Nenad Mitrović (Serbian Cyrillic: Ненад Митровић; born 31 May 1998) is a Serbian footballer who plays as a goalkeeper.

== Club career ==
=== OFK Bačka ===
Born in Novi Sad, Mitrović started his career with OFK Bačka. As a member of team academy, he has joined the first team during the 2013–14 Serbian League Vojvodina season at the age of 16 as an option for a goalkeeper. For the next season, he was also used as an option, but behind experienced Damir Drinić, Goran Labus, Nemanja Latinović and Vladimir Vujasinović. Mitrović made his senior debut in 29 fixture match of the 2014–15 Serbian First League season, against Kolubara, played on 16 May 2015. During the 2015–16 season, Mitrović was used, as a back-up option several times, but however he did not get any chances to perform in the Serbian First League in front of more experienced Damir Drinić, Obren Čučković, Vladimir Vujasinović and Miloš Stepandić, Mitrović was also loaned to the Novi Sad-Srem Zone League club Budućnost Gložan. After club made promotion in the Serbian SuperLiga, Mitrović started 2016–17 as a third choice goalkeeper. In the winter break off-season, Mitrović moved on a six-month loan to the Serbian League Belgrade side Žarkovo. In summer 2017, Mitrović joined Radnički Šid at one-year loan deal.

== Career statistics ==
As of 7 June 2018

Appearances and goals by club, season and competition
Club	Season	League			Cup		Continental		Other		Total	
Club	Season	Division	Apps	Goals	Apps	Goals	Apps	Goals	Apps	Goals	Apps	Goals
OFK Bačka	2013–14	Serbian League Vojvodina	0	0	—		—		—		0	0
OFK Bačka	2014–15	Serbian First League	1	0	—		—		—		1	0
OFK Bačka	2015–16	Serbian First League	0	0	0	0	—		—		0	0
OFK Bačka	2016–17	Serbian SuperLiga	0	0	0	0	—		—		0	0
OFK Bačka	2017–18	Serbian SuperLiga	0	0	—		—		—		0	0
OFK Bačka	Total		1	0	0	0	—		—		1	0
Budućnost Gložan (loan)	2015–16	Novi Sad-Srem Zone League	25	0	—		—		—		25	0
Žarkovo (loan)	2016–17	Serbian League Belgrade	2	0	—		—		—		2	0
Radnički Šid (loan)	2017–18	Serbian League Vojvodina	22	0	—		—		—		22	0
Career total			50	0	0	0	—		—		50	0
