= Marko Gajić =

Serbian footballer

Personal information
- Full name: Marko Gajić
- Date of birth: 10 March 1992 (age 34)
- Place of birth: Belgrade, SFR Yugoslavia
- Height: 1.90 m (6 ft 3 in)
- Position: Defender

Team information
- Current team: Jedinstvo Stara Pazova
- Number: 6

Senior career*
Years	Team	Apps	(Gls)
2009–2013	Radnički Nova Pazova	66	(0)
2014	OFK Beograd	0	(0)
2014–2016	Javor Ivanjica	42	(0)
2016–2018	Voždovac	50	(1)
2018–2020	Olimpija Ljubljana	4	(0)
2020–2021	Voždovac	34	(2)
2021	FC U Craiova	10	(0)
2022	Radnički 1923	8	(0)
2022	Borac Banja Luka	13	(0)
2023	Čukarički	10	(0)
2023–2024	Železničar Pančevo	10	(0)
2024–2025	Inđija	16	(0)
2025	Jedinstvo Stara Pazova	12	(0)
2026–	Jadran Golubinci	0	(0)

International career^{‡}
2021	Serbia	1	(0)
- * Club domestic league appearances and goals as of 16 September 2024 ‡ National team caps and goals as of 29 January 2021

Marko Gajić (Serbian Cyrillic: Марко Гајић; born 10 March 1992) is a Serbian footballer who plays as a defender for Inđija.

== Career ==
Born in Belgrade, Gajić started his career at Radnički Nova Pazova. He moved to OFK Beograd in winter break-off 2013–14 season, but after six months he left the club. He made one cup appearance for OFK Beograd. In summer 2014, Gajić signed a three-year contract with Javor Ivanjica. After two seasons he spent with Javor Ivanjica, Gajić moved to Voždovac in summer 2016.

== Career statistics ==
As of 16 June 2018

Club performance			League		Cup		Continental		Total	
Season	Club	League	Apps	Goals	Apps	Goals	Apps	Goals	Apps	Goals
2009–10	Radnički Nova Pazova	Serbian League Vojvodina	7	0	0	0	0	0	7	0
2010–11	Radnički Nova Pazova	Serbian League Vojvodina	0	0	0	0	0	0	0	0
2011–12	Radnički Nova Pazova	Serbian League Vojvodina	20	0	0	0	0	0	20	0
2012–13	Radnički Nova Pazova	Serbian First League	25	0	0	0	0	0	25	0
2013–14	Radnički Nova Pazova	Serbian League Vojvodina	14	0	0	0	0	0	14	0
2013–14	OFK Beograd	Serbian SuperLiga	0	0	1	0	0	0	1	0
2014–15	Javor Ivanjica	Serbian First League	10	0	0	0	0	0	10	0
2015–16	Javor Ivanjica	Serbian SuperLiga	32	0	6	0	0	0	38	0
2016–17	Voždovac	Serbian SuperLiga	15	1	2	0	0	0	16	1
2017–18	Voždovac	Serbian SuperLiga	35	0	0	0	0	0	35	0
Career total			157	0	9	0	0	0	166	0
