= Marko Klisura =

Serbian professional footballer (born 1992)

Personal information
- Date of birth: 15 October 1992 (age 34)
- Place of birth: Sremska Mitrovica, FR Yugoslavia
- Height: 1.95 m (6 ft 5 in)
- Position: Centre-back

Youth career
- Vojvodina

Senior career*
Years	Team	Apps	(Gls)
2010–2012	Sloga Temerin	28	(1)
2012	→ Palić (loan)	9	(0)
2012	Mladenovac	0	(0)
2013	Cement Beočin	6	(0)
2013–2014	ČSK Čelarevo	25	(2)
2014–2015	Bačka	25	(1)
2015	Novi Pazar	0	(0)
2015	Spartak Subotica	1	(0)
2016–2017	Bačka	49	(2)
2018	Buxoro	4	(1)
2018–2019	Mumbai City	3	(0)
2019	Rabotnički	11	(0)
2020	Bačka	8	(0)
2021	Mladost Doboj Kakanj	3	(0)
2021	Kabel	8	(0)
2022	Tekstilac Odžaci		
2022–2023	Kabel		
2023–2024	1. Maj Ruma		
2024	Barisardo 1971		
2024	Borac Kozarska Dubica	10	(0)

International career
2017	Serbia	1	(0)
- * Club domestic league appearances and goals as of 16 January 2025

Marko Klisura (Serbian Cyrillic: Марко Клисура; born 15 October 1992) is a Serbian professional footballer who plays as a centre-back.

Mainly a left centre-back, he can also play on the right side and as a left-back in defense or as a defensive midfielder. Although a tall player, Klisura started his career as a left midfielder.

== Club career ==
Born in Sremska Mitrovica, Klisura passed the youth school of Vojvodina. Later he played for Sloga Temerin and had short episodes with Palić, Mladenovac and Cement Beočin. Full affirmation he gained in 2013–14 season playing for ČSK Čelarevo, where he played 25 matches and scored 2 goals. After solid season with Bačka he joined Novi Pazar in summer 2015, but he left that club in a short time. At the last day of the summer 2015 transfer period, Klisura moved to Spartak Subotica, where he made his SuperLiga debut. He left the club after the end first half of 2015–16 season, after only 1 official appearance for Spartak.

In the break off-season, he returned to Bačka. Klisura scored his first SuperLiga goal on 17 May 2017, in 1–0 win over Radnik Surdulica. In late 2017, he mutually terminated a contract with Bačka and left the club. On 17 February 2018, Klisura signed with Uzbekistan Super League side Buxoro. On 19 August 2018, he joined Indian Super League franchise Mumbai City on a one-year deal. After Mumbai City, he also played for Rabotnički and Bačka once again.

On 7 February 2021, Klisura signed a contract with Bosnian Premier League club Mladost Doboj Kakanj. He made his official debut for Mladost on 28 February 2021, in a league game against Široki Brijeg.

After a spell at FK Kabel, Klisura joined Tekstilac Odžaci in 2022. Later in 2022, he was back at FK Kabel.

Ahead of the 2023–24 season, Klisura joined 1. Maj Ruma. In August 2024, Klisura moved to Italian Eccellenza club Barisardo 1971.

== International career ==
At the beginning of 2017, Klisura received a call from Serbia national team head coach, Slavoljub Muslin, for a friendly match against the United States on 29 January 2017, when he made his debut for the team, coming on as a sub six minutes before the final whistle.

== Career statistics ==
=== Club ===
As of match played 8 June 2018.

Club performance			League		Cup		Continental		Total	
Season	Club	League	Apps	Goals	Apps	Goals	Apps	Goals	Apps	Goals
2010–11	Sloga Temerin	Serbian League Vojvodina	16	1	—		—		16	1
2011–12	Sloga Temerin	Serbian League Vojvodina	12	0	—		—		12	0
2011–12	Palić	Serbian League Vojvodina	9	0	—		—		9	0
2012–13	Cement Beočin	Serbian League Vojvodina	6	0	—		—		6	0
2013–14	ČSK Čelarevo	Serbian League Vojvodina	25	2	—		—		25	2
2014–15	OFK Bačka	Serbian First League	25	1	0	0	—		25	1
2015–16	Spartak Subotica	Serbian SuperLiga	1	0	0	0	—		1	0
2015–16	OFK Bačka	Serbian First League	12	0	0	0	—		12	0
2016–17	OFK Bačka	Serbian SuperLiga	24	1	0	0	—		24	1
2017–18	OFK Bačka	Serbian SuperLiga	13	1	1	0	—		14	1
2018	Buxoro	Uzbekistan Super League	4	1	—		—		4	1
Career total			147	7	1	0	—		148	7

=== International ===
As of match played 30 January 2017.

Serbia
Year	Apps	Goals
2017	1	0
Total	1	0
