= Miroslav Tankosić =

Serbian football player (born 1978)

Personal information
- Date of birth: 28 September 1978 (age 48)
- Place of birth: Bačka Palanka, SFR Yugoslavia
- Height: 1.92 m (6 ft 4 in)
- Position: Goalkeeper

Senior career*
Years	Team	Apps	(Gls)
- Sintelon
–2001	Vojvodina Tovariševo		
2001–2004	Bačka BP	27	(0)
2004–2006	Spartak Subotica	52	(0)
2006–2018	ČSK Čelarevo	223	(0)
- * Club domestic league appearances and goals as of 11 November 2017

Miroslav Tankosić (Serbian Cyrillic: Мирослав Танкосић; born 28 September 1978) is a Serbian football goalkeeper. Tankosić also holds the trainer license, and works as a goalkeeper coach in the club.

== Club career ==
Born in Bačka Palanka, Tankosić started his career with the local club Sintelon. Later he played with Vojvodina Tovariševo and Bačka. In summer 2004, Tankosić joined Serbian First League side Spartak Subotica, which was the first club outside he played for outside the municipality of Bačka Palanka. After two seasons playing with the club, Tankosić moved to ČSK Čelarevo in 2006. For the first four seasons with the club, Tankosić was mostly used as a back-up choice. He became the first goalkeeper in the 2010–11 season, when the club relegated in the Serbian League Vojvodina. After he played almost 150 Serbian League Vojvodina matches between 2010 and 2015, Tankosić won the league along with the club a made a promotion to the Serbian First League in summer 2015. Later same year, he also won the Vojvodina region cup with ČSK Čelarevo. Tankosić was awarded for the best goalkeeper of the 2015–16 Serbian First League season by Serbian media Sportski žurnal.

== Career statistics ==
As of 11 November 2017

Appearances and goals by club, season and competition
Club	Season	League			Cup		Continental		Other		Total	
Club	Season	Division	Apps	Goals	Apps	Goals	Apps	Goals	Apps	Goals	Apps	Goals
Bačka BP	2003–04	Serbian League Vojvodina	27	0	—		—		—		27	0
Spartak Subotica	2004–05	Serbian First League	32	0	—		—		—		32	0
Spartak Subotica	2005–06	Serbian First League	20	0	—		—		—		20	0
Spartak Subotica	Total		52	0	—		—		—		52	0
ČSK Čelarevo	2006–07	Serbian First League	11	0	—		—		—		11	0
ČSK Čelarevo	2007–08	Serbian First League	9	0	—		—		—		9	0
ČSK Čelarevo	2008–09	Serbian First League	2	0	—		—		—		2	0
ČSK Čelarevo	2009–10	Serbian First League	2	0	—		—		—		2	0
ČSK Čelarevo	2010–11	Serbian League Vojvodina	25	0	—		—		—		25	0
ČSK Čelarevo	2011–12	Serbian League Vojvodina	25	0	—		—		—		25	0
ČSK Čelarevo	2012–13	Serbian League Vojvodina	30	0	—		—		—		30	0
ČSK Čelarevo	2013–14	Serbian League Vojvodina	29	0	—		—		—		29	0
ČSK Čelarevo	2014–15	Serbian League Vojvodina	28	0	—		—		—		28	0
ČSK Čelarevo	2015–16	Serbian First League	27	0	1	0	—		1 (Note: Including final round of the Vojvodina Cup against Dolina Padina)	0	29	0
ČSK Čelarevo	2016–17	Serbian First League	24	0	1	0	—		—		25	0
ČSK Čelarevo	2017–18	Serbian First League	11	0	0	0	—		—		11	0
ČSK Čelarevo	Total		223	0	2	0	—		1	0	226	0
Career total			302	0	2	0	—		1	0	305	0

== Honours ==
ČSK Čelarevo

- Serbian League Vojvodina: 2014–15
