= Nenad Zečević =

Serbian footballer

Personal information
- Full name: Nenad Zečević
- Date of birth: 7 March 1978 (age 48)
- Place of birth: Novi Sad, SFR Yugoslavia
- Height: 1.84 m (6 ft 0 in)
- Position: Left midfielder

Senior career*
| Years | Team | Apps | (Gls) |
| 1996–1998 | Kabel Novi Sad | 32 | (2) |
| 1998–1999 | Vojvodina | 8 | (0) |
| 1999–2001 | Hajduk Kula | 35 | (0) |
| 2001–2002 | Veternik | 24 | (1) |
| 2002–2003 | Rudar Ugljevik | 21 | (1) |
| 2003–2004 | FK Sarajevo | | |
| 2004–2005 | Čelik Zenica | 25 | (3) |
| 2005 | Radnik Bijeljina | 13 | (3) |
| 2006 | Leotar | 14 | (6) |
| 2006–2007 | Widzew Łódź | 8 | (0) |
| 2007–2010 | Leotar | 48 | (13) |
| 2011 | Drina Zvornik | 2 | (0) |
| 2011 | Leotar | 14 | (1) |
| 2012–2013 | Sloga Temerin | 9 | (3) |
| 2019 | Sloga Temerin | | |
| 2019–2020 | Šajkaš 1908 Kovilj | | |
| 2021 | Fruškogorac Sr. Kamenica | | |
- * Club domestic league appearances and goals as of 1 August 2012

Nenad Zečević (Serbian Cyrillic: Ненад Зeчeвић; born 7 March 1978) is a Serbian retired footballer.

Born in Novi Sad, SR Serbia, he had played with local club FK Kabel before playing with FK Vojvodina and FK Hajduk Kula in the First League of FR Yugoslavia between 1998 and 2001. He would have a spell with FK Veternik in the Second League of FR Yugoslavia before moving to Bosnia in 2002 where he played for almost a decade in the Premier League of Bosnia and Herzegovina with FK Rudar Ugljevik, FK Sarajevo, NK Čelik Zenica, FK Radnik Bijeljina, FK Leotar and FK Drina Zvornik. The exception was the season 2006–07 when he played with Polish side Widzew Łódź in the Ekstraklasa. During the winter break of the 2011–12 season, after having spent exactly a decade abroad, he returned to Serbia and joined third level side FK Sloga Temerin, playing in the Serbian League Vojvodina.

== External sources ==
- Nenad Zečević at Soccerway (archived)
