= Milan Zorica =

Serbian footballer

Personal information
- Date of birth: 7 January 1992 (age 34)
- Place of birth: Knin, Croatia
- Height: 1.78 m (5 ft 10 in)
- Position: Midfielder

Youth career
- Red Star Belgrade

Senior career*
Years	Team	Apps	(Gls)
2010–2012	Sopot	40	(5)
2012	Hajduk Kula	9	(1)
2013	Dunav Stari Banovci	28	(7)
2014	Sloga 33	13	(1)
2014	Bežanija	11	(0)
2015	Bokelj	15	(5)
2015–2017	Grbalj	55	(6)
2017	Ängelholms	8	(1)
2018	Budućnost Dobanovci	13	(3)
2018–2019	Ponsacco	34	(3)
2020–2021	Železničar Pančevo	26	(2)
2021–2022	Omladinac Novi Banovci	0	(0)
2022	OFK Beograd		
2022–2023	Budućnost Dobanovci		
2024	Zemun		
2024–2025	Budućnost Dobanovci		
- * Club domestic league appearances and goals as of 18 April 2021

Milan Zorica (Serbian Cyrillic: Милан Зорица; born 7 January 1992) is a Serbian footballer.

== Career ==
Born in Knin, he played with FK Sopot before joining Serbian SuperLiga side FK Hajduk Kula during the winter break of the 2011–12 season. A year later he moved to FK Dunav Stari Banovci playing in the Serbian League Vojvodina.

On 13 July 2021, he signed with Omladinac Novi Banovci.
