= Mladen Vukasović =

Montenegrin footballer

Personal information
- Full name: Mladen Vukasović
- Date of birth: 22 July 1992 (age 34)
- Place of birth: Cetinje, FR Yugoslavia
- Height: 1.76 m (5 ft 9 1/2 in)
- Position: Forward

Senior career*
| Years | Team | Apps | (Gls) |
| 2010–2011 | Crvena Zvezda Novi Sad | 47 | (5) |
| 2012–2013 | Novi Sad | 2 | (0) |
| 2012–2013 | → ČSK Čelarevo (loan) | 23 | (9) |
| 2013 | BSK Borča | 1 | (0) |
| 2014 | Senta | 10 | (0) |
| 2014–2015 | Cement Beočin | 25 | (1) |
| 2015–2016 | ČSK Čelarevo | 36 | (10) |
| 2017 | Radnik Surdulica | 2 | (0) |
| 2017–2018 | OFK Odžaci | 11 | (0) |
| 2018 | Shabab Al-Aqaba | | |
| 2018 | Borac Sakule | 0 | (0) |
| 2019- | ČSK Čelarevo | | |
- * Club domestic league appearances and goals as of 15 February 2019

Mladen Vukasović (Cyrillic: Младен Вукасовић, born 22 July 1992) is a Montenegrin professional footballer who played for Radnik Surdulica in the Serbian SuperLiga.

He is a younger brother of Marko Vukasović.

== Club career ==
Born in Cetinje, Vukasović played in lower league Serbian clubs Crvena Zvezda Novi Sad, Novi Sad, ČSK Čelarevo, BSK Borča, Senta and Cement Beočin. During winter break of 2016–17 he joined Radnik Surdulica thus making a debut in the Serbian highest level.
