= Novi Sad Football League =

- Country: Serbia
- Province: Vojvodina
- Region: Bačka
- Number of clubs: 18
- Level on pyramid: 6
- Promotion to: GPFL Novi Sad
- Relegation to: no relegation
- Current champions: Tatra Kisač (2013–14)
- Website: https://fsgns.rs/

Novi Sad City League (Serbian: Градска лига Нови Сад; Gradska liga Novi Sad) is one of the 52 Intermunicipal football league in Serbia. Inter-municipal league as a sixth level league football competition in Serbia. In league clubs compete with area of Novi Sad, Beočin and Temerin, which is managed by the Football Association of the City of Novi Sad. The league has 18 teams. Champion goes directly or through a barrage of GPFL Novi Sad.

== Champions history ==
Season	Number of clubs	Champion	Points	Runner-up	Points	Third-placed	Points
2010/11	15	FK Stražilovo Milan, Sremski Karlovci	76	FK Mladost, Novi Sad	67	FK TSK, Temerin	65
2011/12	16	FK TSK, Temerin	82	FK Mladost, Novi Sad	72	OFK Sirig, Sirig	55
2012/13	16	FK Mladost, Novi Sad	71	FK Susek, Susek	69	FK Fruškogorac, Sremska Kamenica	66
2013/14	18	FK Tatra, Kisač	73	OFK Slavija, Novi Sad	72 (-3)	FK Šajkaš 1908, Kovilj	66

== See also ==
- Serbian SuperLiga
- Serbian First League
- Serbian League
- Vojvodina League West
- Serbian Zone League
- GPFL Novi Sad
