= Aleksandar Sedlar =

Serbian footballer (born 1991)

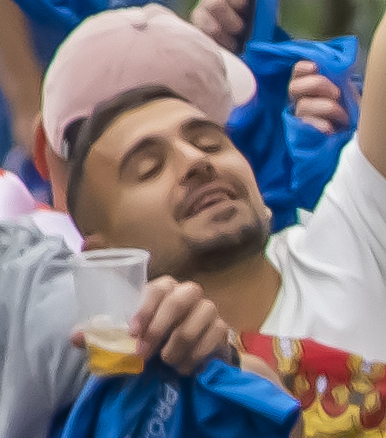
- Sedlar in 2023

Personal information
- Date of birth: 13 December 1991 (age 34)
- Place of birth: Novi Sad, SR Serbia, Yugoslavia
- Height: 1.80 m (5 ft 11 in)
- Positions: Defender; midfielder

Team information
- Current team: IMT
- Number: 15

Youth career
- Vojvodina

Senior career*
Years	Team	Apps	(Gls)
2009–2011	Borac Novi Sad		
2011–2012	Veternik	14	(0)
2012–2016	Metalac Gornji Milanovac	99	(4)
2016–2019	Piast Gliwice	84	(10)
2019–2022	Mallorca	38	(0)
2022–2025	Alavés	51	(1)
2025–2026	Tractor	20	(0)
2026–	IMT	0	(0)

International career
2016	Serbia	2	(0)
- * Club domestic league appearances and goals as of 14:11, 18 August 2026 (UTC)

Aleksandar Sedlar (Serbian Cyrillic: Александар Седлар; born 13 December 1991) is a Serbian professional footballer who plays for Serbian Superliga club IMT. He can play as a wide or central midfielder, and in defense as a centre or full-back.

Sedlar has started his career as a midfielder, but affirmed himself as a centre-back playing with Metalac Gornji Milanovac.

== Club career ==
=== Early career ===
Born in Novi Sad, Sedlar passed the youth school of FK Vojvodina. He started his senior career playing with local clubs Borac and Indeks. Later he moved in the Serbian League Vojvodina club, Veternik, where he made 14 appearances for the 2011–12 season.

Sedlar in action for Tractor in 2025

=== Metalac Gornji Milanovac ===
==== 2012–13 season ====
Sedlar joined Metalac for the 2012–13 season. He made 21 appearances in the Serbian First League and also played in 2 cup matches.

==== 2013–14 season ====
For the difference of previous season, while he played mostly as a midfielder, Sedlar got the new role, and in new season, he was used usually as a defender. Sometimes, he also was moved to left-back position while he has played as a midfielder, so positions in defense were not strange for him. Later, he was rotated on centre-back position, but he was not the first choice, so he made only 3 league caps and one cup match for the autumn half of season. After changing coach, formation was changed too, and Metalac was playing with 3 centre-backs for the better part of spring half-season. Sedlar played all matches in that period, and his position was something like Emre Can's in Liverpool for 2014–15 season. He made total 20 appearances until the end of season, including 18 league, 1 cup, and 1 play-off match.

==== 2014–15 season ====
In the 2014–15 season, Sedlar was in group of the most important players for Metalac, with 26 league caps. He also played on some different positions as in the past, but all of 26 matches he started on the field and scored 2 goals, against Jedinstvo Putevi, and Javor Ivanjica. He also played 2 cup matches, against and Napredak and Voždovac, and 2 play-off matches after then Metalac promoted in Serbian SuperLiga.

==== 2015–16 season ====
Sedlar made his SuperLiga debut in the 1st fixture of 2015–16 season as a centre-back, in tandem with Vladimir Otašević. In the 7th fixture he scored a goal in away win against Spartak Subotica. In the 9th fixture he also scored an away goal, against Vojvodina. Sedlar missed some matches in the first half season because of injury, but beginning of December, the media reported Red Star Belgrade has expressed interest in him. Later, after the end first half of season, appeared the information that Partizan interested too. During the season, Sedlar played mostly matches as a team captain, and was one of the most important players in roster. Sedlar was also selected in the team of the season by Sportski žurnal.

=== Piast Gliwice ===
Sedlar signed three-year contract with Ekstraklasa club Piast Gliwice in June 2016.

=== Mallorca ===
On 12 July 2019, Sedlar signed a four-year deal with La Liga side RCD Mallorca as a free agent.

=== Alavés ===
On 5 July 2022, Sedlar signed a two-year contract with Deportivo Alavés in Segunda División, after his contract with Mallorca expired.

=== Tractor ===
On 16 July 2025, he joined reigning Persian Gulf Pro League champions Tractor.

== International career ==
The coach of the Serbia national team, Slavoljub Muslin, called Sedlar into the squad for several friendly matches during the year 2016. He made his first appearance for the Serbia national football team in a friendly 2–1 win against Cyprus on 25 May 2016.

== Career statistics ==
=== Club ===
As of match played 12 September 2025

Appearances and goals by club, season and competition
Club	Season	League			National cup (Note: Includes Serbian Cup, Polish Cup, Copa del Rey)		Continental		Other		Total	
Club	Season	Division	Apps	Goals	Apps	Goals	Apps	Goals	Apps	Goals	Apps	Goals
Veternik	2011–12	Serbian League Vojvodina	14	0	—		—		—		14	0
Metalac Gornji Milanovac	2012–13	Serbian First League	21	0	2	0	—		—		23	0
Metalac Gornji Milanovac	2013–14	Serbian First League	18	0	1	0	—		1 (Note: Appearance(s) in Serbian SuperLiga play-offs)	0	20	0
Metalac Gornji Milanovac	2014–15	Serbian First League	26	2	2	0	—		2	0	30	2
Metalac Gornji Milanovac	2015–16	Serbian SuperLiga	34	2	—		—		—		34	2
Metalac Gornji Milanovac	Total		99	4	5	0	—		3	0	107	4
Piast Gliwice	2016–17	Ekstraklasa	31	3	1	0	1 (Note: Appearance in UEFA Europa League)	0	—		33	3
Piast Gliwice	2017–18	Ekstraklasa	23	1	1	0	—		—		24	1
Piast Gliwice	2018–19	Ekstraklasa	30	6	1	0	—		—		31	6
Piast Gliwice	Total		84	10	3	0	1	0	—		88	10
Mallorca	2019–20	La Liga	12	0	2	0	—		—		14	0
Mallorca	2020–21	Segunda División	16	0	1	0	—		—		17	0
Mallorca	2021–22	La Liga	10	0	4	0	—		—		14	0
Mallorca	Total		38	0	7	0	—		—		45	0
Alavés	2022–23	Segunda División	34	0	3	0	—		—		37	0
Alavés	2023–24	La Liga	11	1	0	0	—		—		11	1
Alavés	2024–25	La Liga	6	0	1	0	—		—		7	0
Alavés	Total		51	1	4	0	—		—		55	1
Tractor	2025–26	Persian Gulf Pro League	3	0	0	0	1 (Note: Appearance in AFC Champions League Elite)	0	1 (Note: Appearance in Iranian Super Cup)	0	5	0
Career total			289	15	18	0	2	0	4	0	313	15

=== International ===
As of 31 December 2016

Appearances and goals by national team and year
National team	Year	Apps	Goals
Serbia	2016	2	0
Total		2	0

== Honours ==
Piast Gliwice

- Ekstraklasa: 2018–19

Tractor

- Iranian Super Cup: 2025

Individual

- Ekstraklasa Defender of the Season: 2018–19
