= Milko Novaković =

Serbian-born Montenegrin footballer

Personal information
- Full name: Milko Novaković
- Date of birth: 21 January 1988 (age 38)
- Place of birth: Novi Sad, SFR Yugoslavia
- Height: 1.89 m (6 ft 2 1/2 in)
- Position: Centre-back

Senior career*
Years	Team	Apps	(Gls)
2006–2007	Vojvodina	0	(0)
2006	→ Cement Beočin (loan)	12	(0)
2007	→ Sloga Temerin (loan)	15	(1)
2007–2008	Banat Zrenjanin	2	(0)
2008–2009	Novi Sad	21	(0)
2009–2010	Mogren	6	(0)
2010	Videoton	0	(0)
2010–2011	Vojvodina	3	(1)
2011	→ Metalac Gornji Milanovac (loan)	0	(0)
2011	→ Grbalj (loan)	6	(0)
2012	Javor Ivanjica	22	(0)
2013	BSK Borča	15	(1)
2013	Dacia Chișinău	10	(0)
2014–2016	Vojvodina	10	(1)
2017–2018	ČSK Čelarevo	0	(0)

International career^{‡}
2008–2009	Montenegro U21	12	(0)
- * Club domestic league appearances and goals as of 30 March 2017 ‡ National team caps and goals as of 2 September 2012

Milko Novaković (Serbian Cyrillic: Милко Новаковић; born 21 January 1988) is a Serbian-born Montenegrin footballer.

== Club career ==
He played in Serbia for Cement Beočin, Sloga Temerin, Banat Zrenjanin and FK Novi Sad, in Montenegro for Mogren, and Hungarian side Videoton.

== International career ==
He was a member of Montenegro national under-21 football team.
