= Petar Mićin =

Serbian footballer

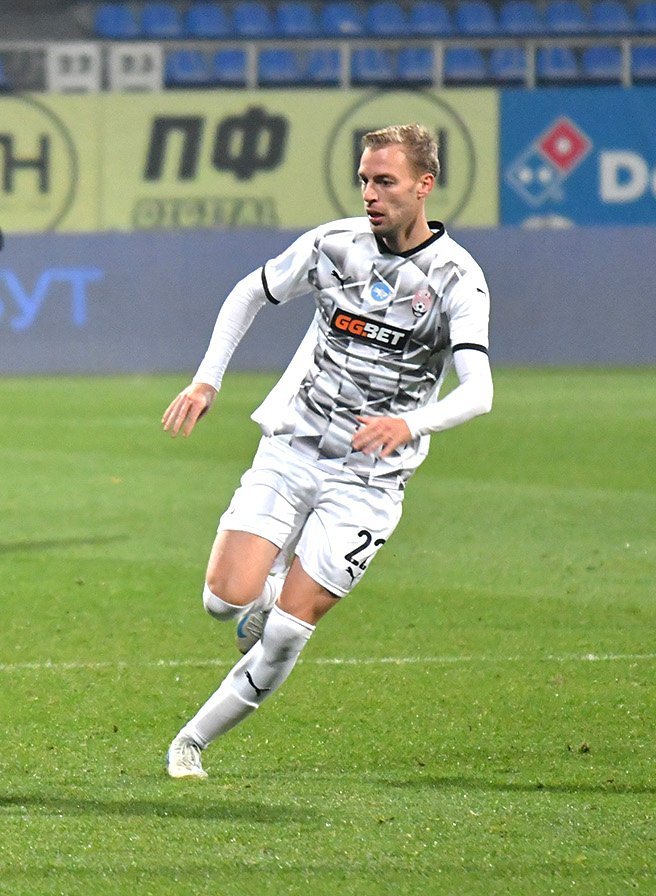

Personal information
- Date of birth: 29 September 1998 (age 28)
- Place of birth: Novi Sad, FR Yugoslavia
- Height: 1.90 m (6 ft 3 in)
- Position: Winger

Team information
- Current team: Sogdiana
- Number: 7

Youth career
- –2017: Vojvodina

Senior career*
Years	Team	Apps	(Gls)
2017	Vojvodina	1	(0)
2017	→ Crvena Zvezda (loan)	11	(3)
2017–2018	Čukarički	17	(5)
2018	→ Chievo (loan)	0	(0)
2018–2022	Udinese	2	(0)
2019–2020	→ Čukarički (loan)	11	(0)
2021–2022	→ Sereď (loan)	13	(1)
2022	Napredak Kruševac	16	(0)
2023	Radnički Niš	16	(0)
2023–2026	Zorya Luhansk	67	(11)
2026–	Sogdiana	11	(1)

International career
2014	Serbia U17	1	(0)
2017–2019	Serbia U21	6	(0)
- * Club domestic league appearances and goals as of 29 July 2026

Petar Mićin (Serbian Cyrillic: Петар Мићин, pronounced [pětar mǐːtɕin, pê-]; born 29 September 1998) is a Serbian footballer who plays for Sogdiana.

== Club career ==
=== Vojvodina ===
Born in Novi Sad, Mićin passed Vojvodina youth school and joined the first team at the age of 18. He also spent his first six months of senior football as a bonus player with local club Crvena Zvezda, where he was playing on dual registration in second half of the 2016–17 Serbian League Vojvodina season. Returning to Vojvodina in summer 2017, Mićin passed the whole pre-season with the first team. He made his Serbian SuperLiga debut on 21 July 2017, in 1–0 home victory over Čukarički. Shortly after the official debut for Vojvodina's first team, Mićin asked to leave the club, which led to him being suspended by the club's management.

=== Čukarički ===
On the last day of the summer transfer window 2017, Mićin signed a five-year professional contract with Čukarički. He scored his first goal for new club in his debut match, for 2–0 away victory over Mačva Šabac on 8 September 2017. He scored a twice in a cup win against Jagodina on 20 September, as also the only for beating Zlatibor Čajetina in the same competition. Finally, Mićin scored his fifth goal in the first half-season against Red Star Belgrade on 26 November 2017.

==== Loan to Chievo ====
Mićin joined Chievo on loan from Čukarički in the period of 31 January 2018 to 30 June 2018.

=== Udinese ===
Mićin joined Udinese Calcio on 1 July 2018. He made his first team debut on the last matchday of the season, on 26 May 2019 against Cagliari in the 88th minute. Udinese won the match 2-1 securing 12th place in the Serie A at the end of the season.

==== Loan to Čukarički ====
On 2 September 2019, he returned to Čukarički on loan.

==== Loan to Sereď ====
Before closing of the summer transfer window, on 6 September 2021, Mićin signed a loan deal with Sereď until December 2021.

=== Napredak Kruševac ===
On 11 July 2022, Mićin joined Napredak Kruševac on a two-year contract.

== Career statistics ==
As of 11 July 2019

Appearances and goals by club, season and competition
Club	Season	League			Cup		Continental		Other		Total	
Club	Season	Division	Apps	Goals	Apps	Goals	Apps	Goals	Apps	Goals	Apps	Goals
Crvena Zvezda Novi Sad (loan)	2016–17	Serbian League Vojvodina	11	3	—		—		—		11	3
Vojvodina	2016–17	Serbian SuperLiga	0	0	0	0	—		—		0	0
Vojvodina	2017–18	Serbian SuperLiga	1	0	—		0	0	—		1	0
Vojvodina	Total		1	0	0	0	0	0	—		1	0
Čukarički	2017–18	Serbian SuperLiga	15	2	2	3	—		—		17	5
Udinese	2018–19	Serie A	1	0	0	0	—		—		1	0
Career total			28	5	2	3	0	0	—		30	8
