= Milan Jovanić =

Serbian footballer and coach (born 1985)

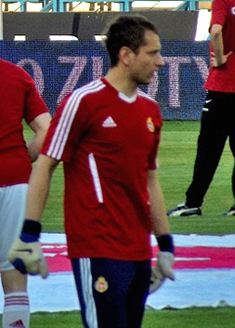

Personal information
- Date of birth: 31 July 1985 (age 41)
- Place of birth: Novi Sad, SFR Yugoslavia
- Height: 1.88 m (6 ft 2 in)
- Position: Goalkeeper

Team information
- Current team: Novi Sad 1921 (goalkeeping coach)

Youth career
- Vojvodina

Senior career*
Years	Team	Apps	(Gls)
2002–2004	Veternik	38	(0)
2005–2006	Perth Glory	1	(0)
2006–2009	Novi Sad	56	(0)
2009–2010	Spartak Zlatibor Voda	29	(0)
2010–2012	Wisła Kraków	6	(0)
2013	Spartak Subotica	3	(0)
2014–2015	Vojvodina	8	(0)
Total		141	(0)

International career
2003–2004	Serbia and Montenegro U19		
2010	Serbia	1	(0)

Managerial career
- 2018: Cement Beočin (goalkeeping coach)
- 2018–2022: Vojvodina (goalkeeping coach)
- 2022: Borac Banja Luka (goalkeeping coach)
- 2022: Radnički Niš (goalkeeping coach)
- 2023: Mladost Novi Sad (goalkeeping coach)
- 2024–: Novi Sad 1921 (goalkeeping coach)
- * Club domestic league appearances and goals

Milan Jovanić (Serbian Cyrillic: Милан Јованић; born 31 July 1985) is a Serbian former professional footballer who played as a goalkeeper. He is currently the goalkeeping coach of Novi Sad 1921.

== Club career ==
Jovanić began his career at hometown club FK Vojvodina, before moving to FK Veternik. In 2005, he joined Australian A-League club Perth Glory. He made one league appearance for Perth in a match against Sydney FC, and left the club after the 2005–06 season. He kept a clean sheet, and as of 2024, is the only non-emergency goalkeeper to have played in the A-League and left without conceding a goal.

Jovanić returned to Serbia and signed with FK Novi Sad from Serbian League Vojvodina, where he took part of their promotion to the First League. After two seasons in the First League, he moved to the Superliga side Spartak Subotica. Jovanić played 29 matches in 2009–10 season, the club finished 4th in the league and qualified for the European cups. Jovanić finished second in voting for the Best Superliga Goalkeeper, behind Saša Stamenković.

On 13 June 2010, Jovanić joined Polish Ekstraklasa side Wisła Kraków on a five-year deal for an undisclosed fee from Spartak Subotica. He won the Ekstraklasa championship in his debut season.

== International career ==
Jovanić made his senior debut for Serbia in a 3–0 friendly win over Japan in Osaka on 7 April 2010.

== Honours ==
Novi Sad

- Serbian League Vojvodina: 2006–07

Wisła Kraków

- Ekstraklasa: 2010–11
