= Nemanja Buzadžija =

Serbian footballer (born 1989)

Personal information
- Full name: Nemanja Buzadžija
- Date of birth: 16 February 1989 (age 37)
- Place of birth: Novi Sad, SFR Yugoslavia
- Height: 1.84 m (6 ft 0 in)
- Position: Goalkeeper

Team information
- Current team: Indeks Novi Sad

Youth career
- Novi Sad

Senior career*
Years	Team	Apps	(Gls)
2005–2010	Novi Sad	1	(0)
2006–2008	→ Indeks Novi Sad (loan)		
2008–2009	→ Sremac Čerević (loan)		
2010	→ Crvena Zvezda (loan)		
2010–2014	Indeks Novi Sad		
2014–2016	Proleter Novi Sad	23	(0)
2016–2018	Indeks Novi Sad		
2018–2020	FK Sajkas Kovilj		
2020–2021	OFK Stari Grad		
2021–	Indeks Novi Sad		
- * Club domestic league appearances and goals as of 13 June 2016

Nemanja Buzadžija (Serbian Cyrillic: Немања Бузаџија; born 16 February 1989) is a Serbian professional footballer who plays as a goalkeeper.

== Career ==
Born in Novi Sad, Buzadžija passed RFK Novi Sad youth categories. After joined the first team, he was loaned to lower ranked clubs Indeks Novi Sad, Sremac Čerević, and Crvena Zvezda Novi Sad. Later, he moved at Indeks Novi Sad for the second time, but as a single player, where he spent a period between 2010 and 2014.

=== Proleter Novi Sad ===
Buzadžija joined Proleter Novi Sad for the 2014–15 season under coach Zoran Govedarica. During the first half-season, he was usually used as a reserve goalkeeper for Nemanja Nastić and made 1 appearance, but he got the chance and missed just 1 match in spring half-season, sitting on the bench in the 29 fixture match against Bežanija as a reserve for youth team goalkeeper Miloš Milović. Buzadžija started 2015–16 season as a first choice and made 8 First League appearances but later was replaced on goal by Emil Rockov and spent the rest of season usually as a reserve goalkeeper. After 2 seasons, Buzadžija returned to Indeks in summer 2016.

== Career statistics ==
As of 15 June 2016

Club	Season	League			Cup		Continental		Other		Total	
Club	Season	Division	Apps	Goals	Apps	Goals	Apps	Goals	Apps	Goals	Apps	Goals
Proleter Novi Sad	2014–15	Serbian First League	15	0	0	0	–	–	–	–	15	0
Proleter Novi Sad	2015–16	Serbian First League	8	0	0	0	–	–	–	–	8	0
Proleter Novi Sad	Total		23	0	0	0	–	–	–	–	23	0
