= Filip Ungar =

Serbian footballer (born 1995)

Personal information
- Full name: Filip Ungar
- Date of birth: 14 January 1995 (age 31)
- Place of birth: Vrbas, FR Yugoslavia
- Height: 1.90 m (6 ft 3 in)
- Position: Defender

Team information
- Current team: Sloga Temerin

Senior career*
Years	Team	Apps	(Gls)
2012–2014	Vrbas		
2012–2013	→ Polet Sivac (loan)		
2014	ŽSK Žabalj		
2015	Zlaté Moravce	2	(0)
2016–2017	Dukla Banská Bystrica	27	(1)
2017	Inđija	1	(0)
2018	Bečej 1918		
2018	Hajduk 1912		
2019–2022	Cement Beočin		
2022	Sloga Temerin		
2023	Radnički Nova Pazova		
2023–	Sloga Temerin		
- * Club domestic league appearances and goals as of 23 October 2017

Filip Ungar (Serbian Cyrillic: Филип Унгар, born 14 January 1995) is a Serbian footballer who plays for Sloga Temerin.

== Career ==
Filip Ungar started playing in Serbia in fourth–level clubs Vrbas, Polet Sivac and ŽSK Žabalj.

He made his professional debut for Zlaté Moravce against Trenčín on 13 March 2015. Then he played two seasons with Dukla Banská Bystrica before returning to Serbia.

In summer 2017 he signed with Serbian First League side Inđija.
