= FK Dunav Stari Banovci =

Serbian football club

Dunav Stari Banovci
- Full name: Fudbalski Klub Dunav
- Nickname: Alasi (The River Fishermen)
- Founded: 1936; 90 years ago
- Ground: Stadion FK Dunav, Stari Banovci
- Capacity: 680
- President: Velimir Lukić
- League: Vojvodina League South
- 2024–25: Vojvodina League South, 13th of 16
Home colours	Away colours

FK Dunav Stari Banovci (Serbian Cyrillic: ФК Дунав Стари Бановци) is a football club based in Stari Banovci, Vojvodina, Serbia. They compete in the Vojvodina League South, the fourth tier of the national league system.

== History ==
The club won the Vojvodina League West in the 2010–11 season and took promotion to the Serbian League Vojvodina. They participated in the 2012–13 Serbian Cup, being eliminated in the opening round to Metalac Gornji Milanovac. After spending a decade in the third tier, the club placed second from the bottom in the 2020–21 season and suffered relegation to the Vojvodina League South.

== Honours ==
Vojvodina League West (Tier 4)

- 2010–11

== Seasons ==
Season	League									Cup
Season	Division	Pld	W	D	L	GF	GA	Pts	Pos	Cup
Serbia
2010–11	4 – Vojvodina West	30	21	3	6	67	23	66	1st	—
2011–12	3 – Vojvodina	28	12	5	11	34	31	41	6th	—
2012–13	3 – Vojvodina	30	13	7	10	33	38	46	4th	Round of 32
2013–14	3 – Vojvodina	30	13	7	10	42	29	46	5th	—
2014–15	3 – Vojvodina	30	11	9	10	24	28	42	8th	—
2015–16	3 – Vojvodina	30	9	11	10	33	30	38	9th	—
2016–17	3 – Vojvodina	28	12	6	10	43	40	42	5th	—
2017–18	3 – Vojvodina	30	10	6	14	44	61	36	14th	—
2018–19	3 – Vojvodina	32	11	8	13	45	53	41	10th	—
2019–20	3 – Vojvodina	16 (Note: The season was cut short due to the COVID-19 pandemic in Serbia.)	2	3	11	16	38	9	16th	—
2020–21	3 – Vojvodina	38	6	7	25	35	89	25	19th	—
2021–22	4 – Vojvodina South	30	11	4	15	24	47	37	12th	—
2022–23	4 – Vojvodina South	30	8	9	13	25	35	33	13th	—
2023–24	4 – Vojvodina South	30	10	11	9	40	34	41	6th	—
2024–25	4 – Vojvodina South	30	8	5	17	37	50	29	13th	—

== Historical list of coaches ==
- (Serbia) Zoran Rankov
- (Serbia) Vladimir Madžarević (2011)
- (Serbia) Mihajlo Bošnjak (2011-2014)
- (Serbia) Branislav Bajić (2014-2016)
- (Serbia) Goran Dragoljić (2016-2017)
- (Serbia) Srđan Bajić
- (Serbia) Radovan Radaković (2018)
- (Serbia) Goran Nikić (2019-Feb 20)
- (Serbia) Vladimir Madžarević (Feb 2020-Feb 21)
- (Serbia) Igor Marković (2021)
- (Serbia) Miroslav Gordanić
- (Serbia) Zdravko Trivković (2022-2024)
