= Damir Drinić =

Serbian footballer

Personal information
- Date of birth: 20 July 1989 (age 37)
- Place of birth: Bački Jarak, SFR Yugoslavia
- Height: 1.89 m (6 ft 2 in)
- Position: Goalkeeper

Youth career
- Vojvodina

Senior career*
| Years | Team | Apps | (Gls) |
| 2005–2011 | Vojvodina | 2 | (0) |
| 2005–2006 | → Elan Srbobran (loan) | 16 | (0) |
| 2006–2009 | → Proleter Novi Sad (loan) | 71 | (0) |
| 2010 | → Veternik (loan) | 9 | (0) |
| 2011 | → Donji Srem (loan) | 11 | (0) |
| 2012 | Mladost Lučani | 17 | (0) |
| 2012–2014 | Proleter Novi Sad | 13 | (0) |
| 2014–2016 | Bačka Palanka | 32 | (0) |
- * Club domestic league appearances and goals

Damir Drinić (Serbian Cyrillic: Дамир Дринић; born 20 July 1989) is a Serbian retired football goalkeeper.
