= 2009–10 Serbian League Vojvodina =

== League table ==
| Pos | Team | Pld | W | D | L | GF | GA | GD | Pts | Promotion or relegation |
|---|---|---|---|---|---|---|---|---|---|---|
| 1 | FK Big Bull | 30 | 22 | 6 | 2 | 53 | 20 | +33 | 72 | Promoted to First league of Serbia |
| 2 | FK Veternik | 30 | 22 | 4 | 4 | 53 | 24 | +29 | 70 | |
| 3 | FK Palić | 30 | 15 | 6 | 9 | 45 | 26 | +19 | 51 | |
| 4 | FK Donji Srem | 30 | 16 | 2 | 12 | 44 | 30 | +14 | 50 | |
| 5 | FK Radnički Nova Pazova | 30 | 14 | 6 | 10 | 39 | 30 | +9 | 48 | |
| 6 | FK Sloga Temerin | 30 | 12 | 9 | 9 | 36 | 34 | +2 | 45 | |
| 7 | FK Dolina Padina | 30 | 13 | 3 | 14 | 45 | 40 | +5 | 42 | |
| 8 | FK Senta | 30 | 11 | 7 | 12 | 42 | 36 | +6 | 40 | |
| 9 | FK Mladost Bački Jarak | 30 | 11 | 6 | 13 | 36 | 40 | −4 | 39 | |
| 10 | FK Vršac | 30 | 11 | 6 | 13 | 29 | 36 | −7 | 39 | |
| 11 | FK Tekstilac Odžaci | 30 | 12 | 2 | 16 | 28 | 35 | −7 | 38 | |
| 12 | OFK Kikinda | 30 | 10 | 7 | 13 | 38 | 51 | −13 | 37 | |
| 13 | FK Bačka | 30 | 10 | 6 | 14 | 33 | 36 | −3 | 36 | Relegated to regional leagues |
| 14 | FK Radnički Šid | 30 | 8 | 8 | 14 | 38 | 47 | −9 | 32 | Relegated to regional leagues |
| 15 | FK Metalac Futog | 30 | 6 | 7 | 17 | 23 | 44 | −21 | 22 (Note: 3 points deducted) | Relegated to regional leagues |
| 16 | FK Spartak Debeljača | 30 | 4 | 1 | 25 | 22 | 75 | −53 | 13 | Relegated to regional leagues |
