= Milorad Balabanović =

Serbian footballer

Personal information
- Full name: Milorad Balabanović
- Date of birth: 18 January 1990 (age 36)
- Place of birth: Novi Sad, SFR Yugoslavia
- Height: 1.86 m (6 ft 1 in)
- Position: Defensive midfielder

Team information
- Current team: Mladost Novi Sad
- Number: 27

Senior career*
Years	Team	Apps	(Gls)
2008–2013	RFK Novi Sad	53	(2)
2008–2009	→ Crvena Zvezda (loan)		
2009	→ Palić (loan)	5	(0)
2010	→ Metalac Futog (loan)	12	(1)
2013–2014	Proleter Novi Sad	25	(3)
2014–2015	Spartak Subotica	17	(1)
2015	OFK Bačka	15	(4)
2016	Borac Čačak	16	(1)
2016–2018	OFK Bačka	37	(3)
2018	Krupa	10	(1)
2019	Rad	9	(1)
2019–2021	Proleter Novi Sad	21	(0)
2021–2022	Javor Ivanjica	35	(1)
2022–2023	RFK Novi Sad	23	(1)
2023–	Mladost Novi Sad	17	(1)
- * Club domestic league appearances and goals as of 15 March 2024

Milorad Balabanović (Serbian Cyrillic: Милорад Балабановић; born 18 January 1990) is a Serbian professional footballer who plays as a midfielder for Serbian First League club Mladost Novi Sad.
