= Branislav Bajić =

Serbian footballer

Personal information
- Full name: Branislav Bajić
- Date of birth: 5 May 1977 (age 49)
- Place of birth: Zemun, SFR Yugoslavia
- Height: 1.80 m (5 ft 11 in)
- Position: Defender

Senior career*
Years	Team	Apps	(Gls)
1997–2003	Zemun		
2003–2008	Xerez	117	(5)
2009–2010	Ionikos	22	(0)
2010–2011	Metalac Gornji Milanovac	19	(0)
2011–2012	San Fernando	16	(0)
2012–2013	Portuense	32	(1)
2013–2014	Xerez Deportivo	6	(0)
Total		212	(6)

Managerial career
- 2014–2016: Dunav Stari Banovci
- 2016: Inđija
- 2016–2017: Kolubara
- 2021: Omladinac Novi Banovci
- * Club domestic league appearances and goals

Branislav Bajić (Serbian Cyrillic: Бранислав Бајић; born 5 May 1977) is a Serbian former professional footballer who played as a defender and current manager.

== Career ==
After playing for Zemun in his homeland, Bajić moved abroad to Spanish club Xerez in 2003. He made over 100 Segunda División appearances over the course of next five seasons. Later in his career, Bajić played for Spanish lower league clubs San Fernando, Portuense and Xerez Deportivo.

After hanging up his boots, Bajić returned to Serbia and served as manager of Dunav Stari Banovci, Inđija and Kolubara.
