= FK Glogonj =

ФК Глогоњ FK Glogonj
- Full name: Fudbalski klub Glogonj
- Founded: 1935; 91 years ago
- Ground: Stadion 'Sportski centar', Glogonj
- Capacity: 300
- Chairman: Saša Veselinović
- Manager: Stojče Cvetković
- League: Vojvodina League East
- 2024–2025: PFL Pančevo, 1st (promoted)

FK Glogonj (Serbian Cyrillic: ФК Глогоњ) is a Serbian football club based in the village of Glogonj near Pančevo, Serbia. They compete in the 4th-tier Vojvodina League East.

== History ==
The club was founded in 1935. Glogonj won the 2004–05 Serbian League Vojvodina, but later was merged with PSK Pančevo.

=== Recent league history ===
Season	Division	P	W	D	L	F	A	Pts	Pos
2020–21	6 - Second South Banat League "West" - group North	18	14	2	2	55	18	44	2nd
2021–22	6 - Second South Banat League "West"	27	19	2	6	81	38	59	2nd
2022–23	5 - PFL Pančevo	30	12	7	11	50	49	43	7th
2023–24	5 - PFL Pančevo	30	16	1	13	80	61	49	5th
2024–25	5 -PFL Pančevo	30	25	3	2	123	19	77 (Note: The club was docked one point.)	1st
