= Stari Banovci =

Stari Banovci Стари Бановци (Serbian)
- Village (Selo)
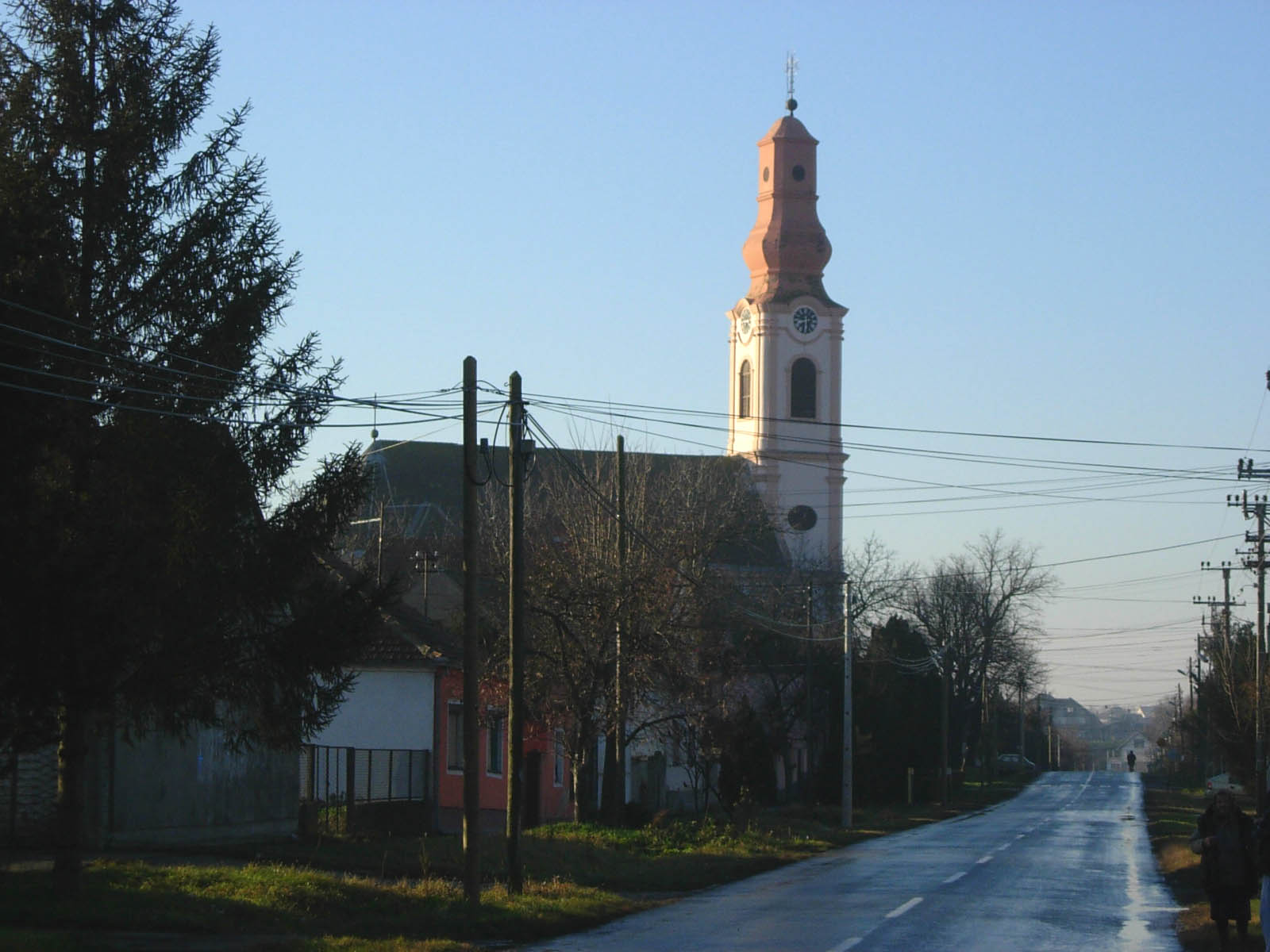
- The Orthodox church

- Location within Vojvodina Location within Serbia Location within Europe
- Coordinates: 44°59′N 20°17′E
- Country: Serbia
- Province: Vojvodina
- Region: Syrmia
- District: Srem
- Municipality: Stara Pazova

Area
  - Total: 30.48 km^{2} (11.77 sq mi)

Population (2011)
  - Total: 5,954
  - Density: 195.3/km^{2} (505.9/sq mi)

Stari Banovci (Serbian Cyrillic: Стари Бановци) is a suburban settlement in Serbia. It is located in the Stara Pazova municipality, in the region of Syrmia (Syrmia District), in the Vojvodina Autonomous Province. Stari Banovci, Banovci-Dunav and Novi Banovci together form the urban settlement of Banovci. The population of the settlement as a whole is 16,000 people (2011 census).

== History ==
In ancient times, Roman fortress named Burgene existed at this location. The village of Banovci existed here since the 16th century, and perhaps even before that. Another two villages, Darinovci and Tusa, were situated at this location, but both were later resettled.

According to the Ottoman census from 1566/7, most of the inhabitants of Banovci were Serbs. In 1734, the population of the village was composed of 53 houses. In 1756, population numbered 211 houses.

During the Axis occupation in World War II, 158 villagers were murdered, 52 were sent to concentration camp Sajmište, 38 were sent to forced labour, and 104 were held as war prisoners.

== Historical population ==
- 1948: 2,029
- 1953: 2,074
- 1961: 2,374
- 1971: 2,829
- 1981: 3,393
- 1991: 4,033
- 2002: 5,488
- 2011: 5,954

== Sports and Tourism ==
International hiking and biking route Sultans Trail goes through Banovci. Both routes follow the old route from Budapest to Istanbul.

The local football club Dunav Stari Banovci plays in the 4th-tier of Serbian football.

== See also ==
- Stara Pazova
- Syrmia District
- List of places in Serbia
- List of cities, towns and villages in Vojvodina
