= Marko Jondić =

Serbian footballer

Personal information
- Full name: Marko Jondić
- Date of birth: 3 May 1995 (age 31)
- Place of birth: Subotica, FR Yugoslavia
- Height: 1.85 m (6 ft 1 in)
- Position: Midfielder

Team information
- Current team: Nybergsund IL-Trysil
- Number: 99

Youth career
- Spartak Subotica

Senior career*
Years	Team	Apps	(Gls)
2011–2016	Spartak Subotica	35	(0)
2012–2013	→ Palić (loan)	26	(1)
2018–2019	Elverum	42	(2)
2021	Nybergsund	12	(0)
2022-	Nybergsund IL-Trysil	50	(13)
- * Club domestic league appearances and goals as of 13 September 2024

Marko Jondić (Serbian Cyrillic: Марко Јондић; born 3 May 1995) is a Serbian footballer who plays as a midfielder for Nybergsund IL-Trysil in the Norwegian Fourth Division.

On 13 February 2018, he signed for Norwegian Second Division club Elverum.
