= OFK Slavija Novi Sad =

OFK Slavija
- Full name: Omladinski Fudbalski Klub Slavija Novi Sad
- Founded: 1926; 100 years ago
- Ground: Stadion Salajka, Novi Sad
- Capacity: 428
- Chairman: Radoslav Čolović
- Manager: Tihomir Krsmanović
- League: Novi Sad First League
- 2024-25: Novi Sad First League, 6th
colours	colours

OFK Slavija Novi Sad (Serbian Cyrillic: ОФК Славија Нови Сад) is a football club based in Novi Sad, Serbia.

== History ==
OFK Slavija was founded in 1926, and is one of the oldest football clubs in town.

During the 1990s, Novi Sad's OFK Slavija was led by Branislav "Dugi" Lainović, a prominent member of Serbian underworld. He performed the duties of OFK Slavija's club president. Lainović was murdered on March 20, 2000 in Belgrade in front of Hotel Srbija on Ustanička Street.

== Recent league history ==
Season	Division	P	W	D	L	F	A	Pts	Pos
2020–21	5 - PFL Novi Sad	34	17	7	10	53	32	58	3rd
2021–22	5 - PFL Novi Sad	30	27	1	2	88	18	82	1st
2022–23	4 - Vojvodina League South	30	11	5	14	43	51	38	8th
2023–24	4 - Vojvodina League South	30	8	6	16	37	52	30	14th
2024–25	5 - Novi Sad First League	30	15	1	14	64	47	46	6th
