= FK Cement Beočin =

Association football club in Serbia

Cement Beočin
- Full name: Fudbalski klub Cement Beočin
- Nicknames: Plavo-beli (The Blue & Whites)
- Founded: 1913
- Ground: Gradski stadion
- Capacity: 1,500
- President: Rodoljub Daničić
- Head coach: Nenad Cerović
- League: Prva novosadska liga
- 2025–26: 4th
Home colours	Away colours	Third colours

Fudbalski klub Cement Beočin (Serbian Cyrillic: Фудбалски клуб Цемент Беочин, lit. 'Cement Beočin Football Club') is a football club based in Beočin, Serbia.

== History ==

The first starting line-up in the history of the club.

FK Cement Beočin was founded in 1913 by the employees of a Beočin cement company and Mr Martin Bajer, a native of Beočin who received his formal education in Budapest where he first got the idea of founding a football club.

The first starting line-up of the team in 1913 was:

- Goalkeeper: Dejan Đurić
- Defenders: Martin Bajer and Dragutin Karasik
- Right midfielder: M. Daraboš
- Centre midfielder: Vladislav Eseš
- Left midfielder: J. Daraboš
- Right winger: Brana Jovičić
- Left winger: Aleksandar Jegdić
- Right forward: Dejan Krkljus
- Centre forward: Herbst
- Left forward: Tipman

This starting line-up was featured until 1919 under the club name BAK. From 1919 to 1932 the team was known as BSK.

From 1922 to 1927 there were two football clubs in Beočin, the other one being FK Radnički. Radnički was dissolved in 1927 due to financial difficulties and the exodus of some players to the BSK. At that time, BSK featured the following players: Martin Bajer, Janika Sabo, Rudolf Kovačić, Oto Košćal, Josip Bajer, Franja Babi, Karlo Kapošvarc, Franja Mesinger, Janika Oltvanji, Nikola Dvoržak, Ladislav Eseš, D. Manjoki, Martin Dvoržak among others.

Since 1933 the club has been known as FK Cement. Up until World War II, the club included players such as Mile Stojkov, Franja Buršl, Franja Ferić, Rudika Nozak, Leopold Popović, Vilim Rakšanji, Florika Major, Stevan Vajs, Janika Košćal, Ivan Gabrić, Žaki, Ivica Horvat and others.

In 1970, during its 50-year anniversary celebrations, the club was honoured by the Football Association of Yugoslavia as one of the oldest in the country.

== Current squad ==
As of 9 March 2019

Note: Flags indicate national team as defined under FIFA eligibility rules; some limited exceptions apply. Players may hold more than one non-FIFA nationality.

No.	Pos.	Nation	Player
1	GK	SRB	Nemanja Đurikin (vice-captain)
12	GK	SRB	Ivan Knežević
2	DF	MNE	Dejan Peković
3	DF	SRB	Miloš Vilotijević
4	DF	SRB	Nikola Milutinović
5	DF	SRB	Kristijan Bajić
14	DF	SRB	Vladimir Skoko
15	DF	SRB	Mladen Zgonjanin
16	DF	SRB	Aleksandar Leđanac
17	DF	SRB	Filip Ungar
22	DF	SRB	Nenad Marjanović
25	DF	MNE	Stefan Zogović

No.	Pos.	Nation	Player
6	MF	SRB	Nebojša Pavlović
7	MF	SRB	Nikola Kedža
8	MF	SRB	Ognjen Tomović
10	MF	SRB	Zoran Rakić (captain)
11	MF	SRB	Marko Stančetić
18	MF	SRB	Vukan Vujošević
20	MF	SRB	Nikola Vujičić
21	MF	SRB	Nikola Laković
24	MF	SRB	Slavko Gavrilović
9	FW	SRB	Feđa Baletić
19	FW	SRB	Saša Ćurko
23	FW	SRB	Mladen Popović

=== Technical staff ===
Position	Staff
Head coach	Nenad Cerović
Assistant coach	Milan Vignjević
Goalkeeping coach	–
Fitness coach	Vladimir Pupovac

== Club records ==
Club records are in the time span from 2005 to 2018.

Biggest victories in the domestic championships

Season	Match	Score
Serbian League Vojvodina
2004–05	Cement – (Serbia) FK Polet	6–1
2010–11	Cement – (Serbia) Sloboda (NK)	7–0
2011–12	Cement – (Serbia) FK Vršac	5–0
2011–12	Cement – (Serbia) FK ČSK Pivara	4–0
Vojvodina League West
2009–10	Cement – (Serbia) FK ŽAK	6–0
2009–10	(Serbia) Polet (K) – Cement	0–5
2009–10	Cement – (Serbia) FK Šajkaš	7–0

Seasons

Season	Division	Pos
2004–05	Serbian League Vojvodina	3rd
2005–06	Serbian League Vojvodina	5th
2006–07	Serbian League Vojvodina	13th
2008–09	Vojvodina League West	3rd
2009–10	Vojvodina League West	2nd
2010–11	Serbian League Vojvodina	5th
2011–12	Serbian League Vojvodina	8th
2012–13	Serbian League Vojvodina	14th
2013–14	Vojvodina League West	2nd
2014–15	Serbian League Vojvodina	7th
2015–16	Serbian League Vojvodina	8th
2016–17	Serbian League Vojvodina	12th
2017–18	Serbian League Vojvodina	6th
2018–19	Serbian League Vojvodina	16th
2019–20	Vojvodina League South	6th
2020–21	Vojvodina League South	6th
2021–22	Vojvodina League South	15th
2022–23	Prva novosadska liga	4th
2023–24	Vojvodina League West	16th
2024–25	Prva novosadska liga	4th
2025–26	Prva novosadska liga	4th

== Honours ==
Honours are in the time span from 1994. to 2020.

=== National Leagues ===
- Serbian League Vojvodina

Winners (1): 1998–99

- Vojvodina League West

Winners (1): 1994–95
Runners-up (2): 2009–10, 2013–14

=== National Cups ===
- Cup FSG Novi Sad

Runners-up (2): 2017–18, 2019–20

== Notable players ==
Criteria

To appear in this section a player must have either:

- Played at least one official international match for their national team at any time.
- Played at least 80 games for the club.

- (Serbia) Nemanja Radoja
- (Serbia) Marko Poletanović
- (Serbia) Nemanja Čović
- (Serbia) Marko Ilić
- (Serbia) Marko Klisura
- (Serbia) Aleksandar Rakić
- (Serbia) Branko Žigić
- (Serbia) Zoltan Sabo
- (Serbia) Zoran Govedarica

For the list of all current and former players with Wikipedia article, please see: Category:FK Cement Beočin players.

== Coaching history ==
- (Serbia) Mirko Babić (11 July 2014 – 16 August 2017)
- (Serbia) Dragan Milošević (18 August 2017 – 12 April 2018)
- (Serbia) Radovan Krivokapić (14 April 2018 – 10 September 2018)
- (Serbia) Miodrag Pantelić (26 September 2018 – 17 October 2018)
- (Serbia) Dragan Milošević (18 October 2018 – 1 December 2018)
- (Serbia) Nenad Cerović (2 February 2019 – )

== Notes ==
1. Back in 1994, the fourth tier was called First League of Vojvodina.
