= Donji Tovarnik =

Donji Tovarnik Доњи Товарник (Serbian)
- Village (Selo)
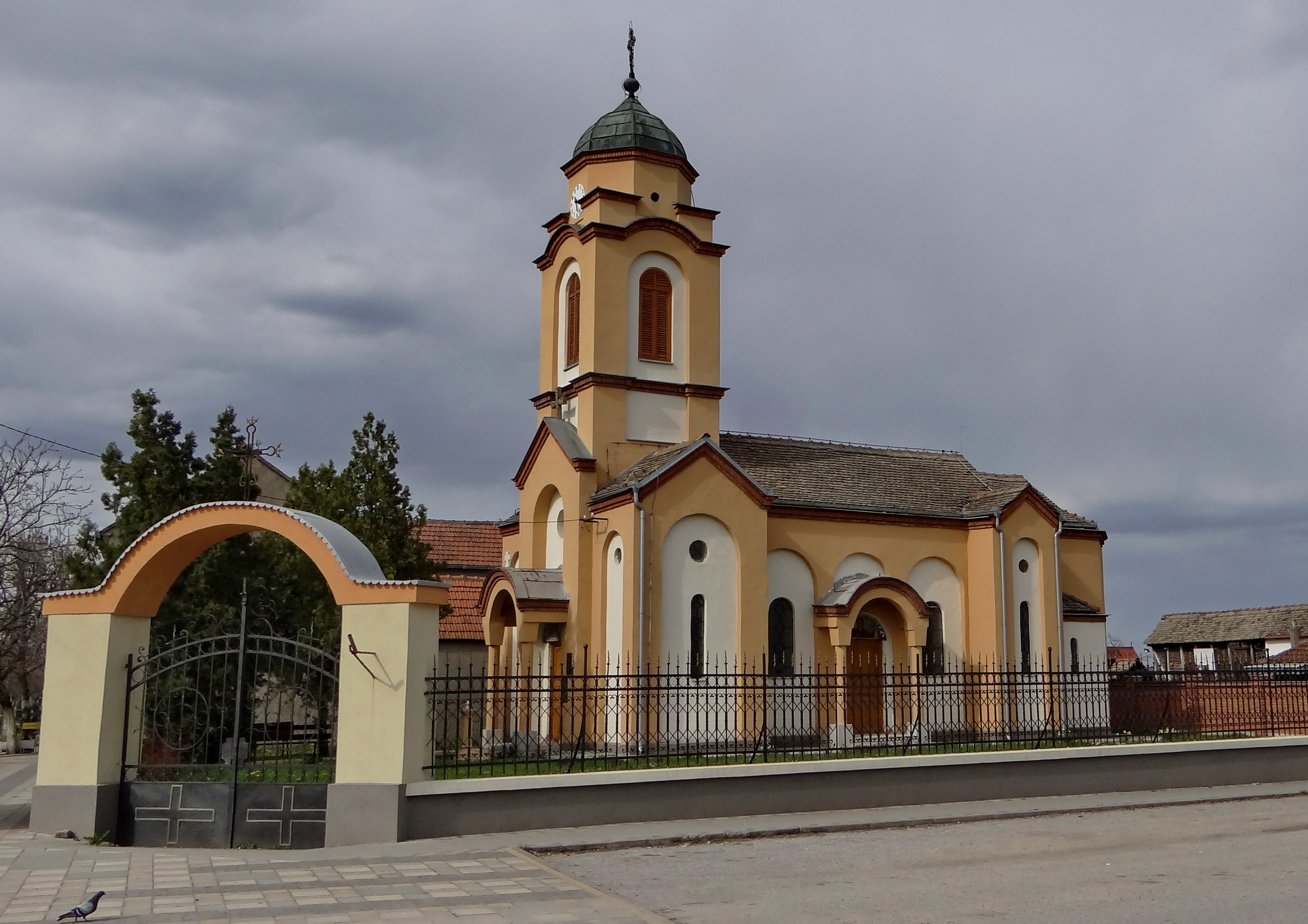
- The Serbian Orthodox Church in Donji Tovarnik

- Location within Vojvodina Location within Serbia Location within Europe
- Coordinates: 44°49′N 19°57′E
- Country: Serbia
- Province: Vojvodina
- District: Srem
- Municipality: Pećinci

Population (2002)
  - Total: 1,016
- Time zone: UTC+1 (CET)
  - Summer (DST): UTC+2 (CEST)

Donji Tovarnik (Serbian Cyrillic: Доњи Товарник) is a village in Serbia. It is situated in the Pećinci municipality, in the Srem District, Vojvodina province. The village has a Serb ethnic majority and its population numbering 1,016 people (2002 census).

== See also ==
- List of places in Serbia
- List of cities, towns and villages in Vojvodina
