= Vojvodina League South =

- Founded: 2014
- Country: Serbia
- Number of clubs: 16
- Level on pyramid: 4
- Promotion to: Serbian League Vojvodina
- Relegation to: Novi Sad First League; Syrmian League
- Domestic cup(s): Serbian Cup; Vojvodina Cup
- Current champions: FK Jedinstvo (2024–25)

The Vojvodina League South (Serbian: Vojvođanska liga "Jug") is the fourth tier of the Serbian football league system in the South Bačka District and Syrmia District. It is one of three leagues at this level in Vojvodina, along with the Vojvodina League East and the Vojvodina League North. The league is operated by the Football Association of Vojvodina.

Vojvodina League South consists of 16 clubs who play each other in a double round-robin league, with each club playing the other club home and away. At the end of the season the top club is promoted to Serbian League Vojvodina.

== Champions history ==
Seasons	Nb. Clubs.	Champions	Points	Runners up	Points
Novi Sad-Syrmia Zone League
2014–15	16	Omladinac, Novi Banovci	67	Borac, Novi Sad	54
2015–16	16	Crvena Zvezda, Novi Sad	69	Jedinstvo, Stara Pazova	67
Vojvodina League South
2016–17	16	Mladost, Bački Jarak	72	Jedinstvo, Stara Pazova	60
2017–18	16	Kabel, Novi Sad	69	Sloga, Erdevik	65
2018–19	15 (Note: FK Borac Novi Sad left the competition.)	FK 1. Maj, Ruma	61	Jugović, Kać	55
2019–20	16	Mladost, Novi Sad	39	Podrinje, Mačvanska Mitrovica	37
2020–21	18	Borac, Šajkaš	73	Jedinstvo, Rumenka	72
2021–22	16	RFK Novi Sad 1921, Novi Sad	64	Podunavac, Belegiš	54
2022–23	16	Železničar, Inđija	63	Sloven, Ruma	62
2023-24	16	Sloboda, Donji Tovarnik	75	Hajduk, Divoš	73
2024-25	16	Jedinstvo, Stara Pazova	76	Mladost, Bački Jarak	74

== See also ==
- Serbian SuperLiga
- Serbian First League
- Serbian League
- Serbian Zone League
