= Divoš, Sremska Mitrovica =

Divoš Дивош (Serbian)
- Village (Selo)
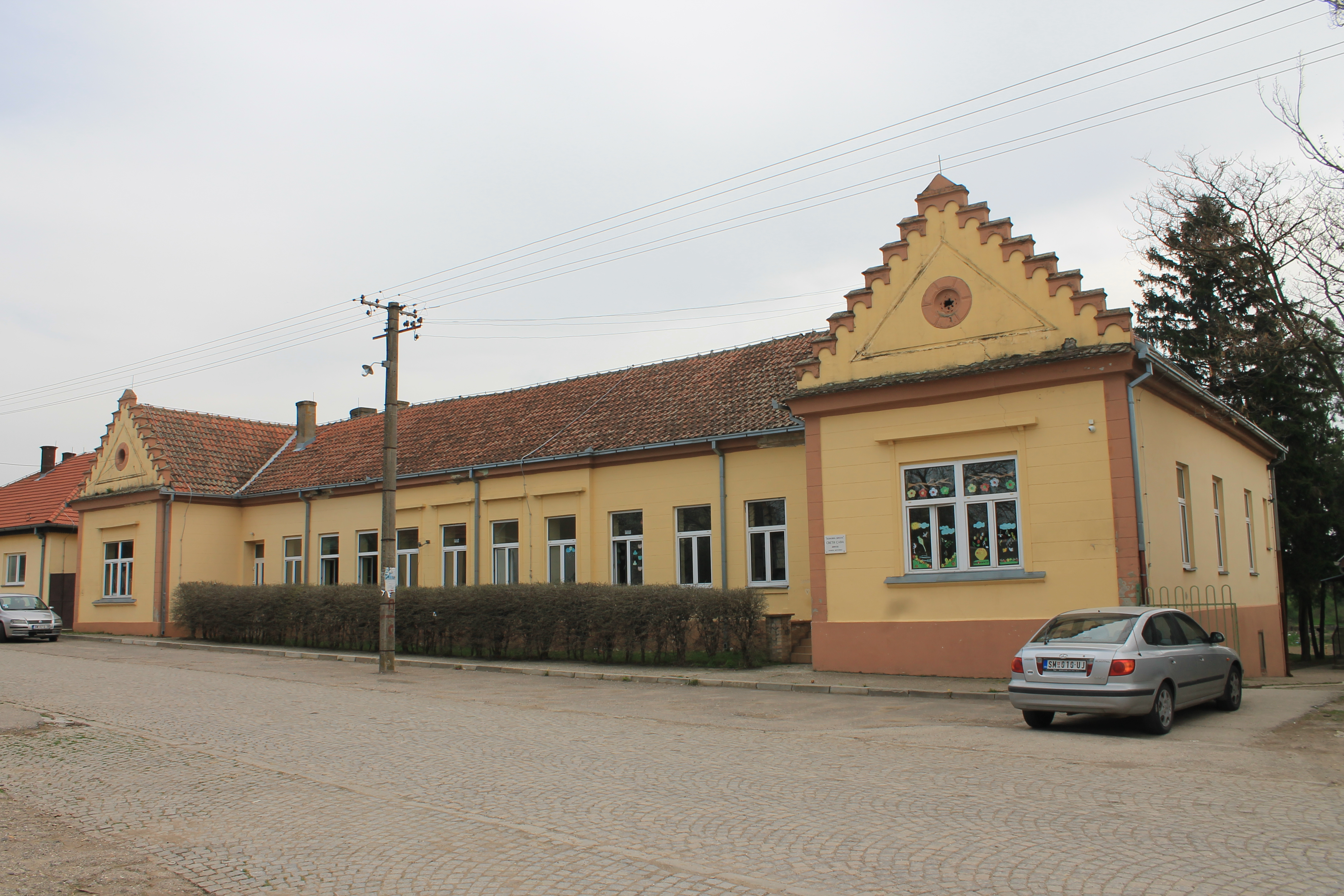
- Elementary School "Sveti Sava" in Divoš

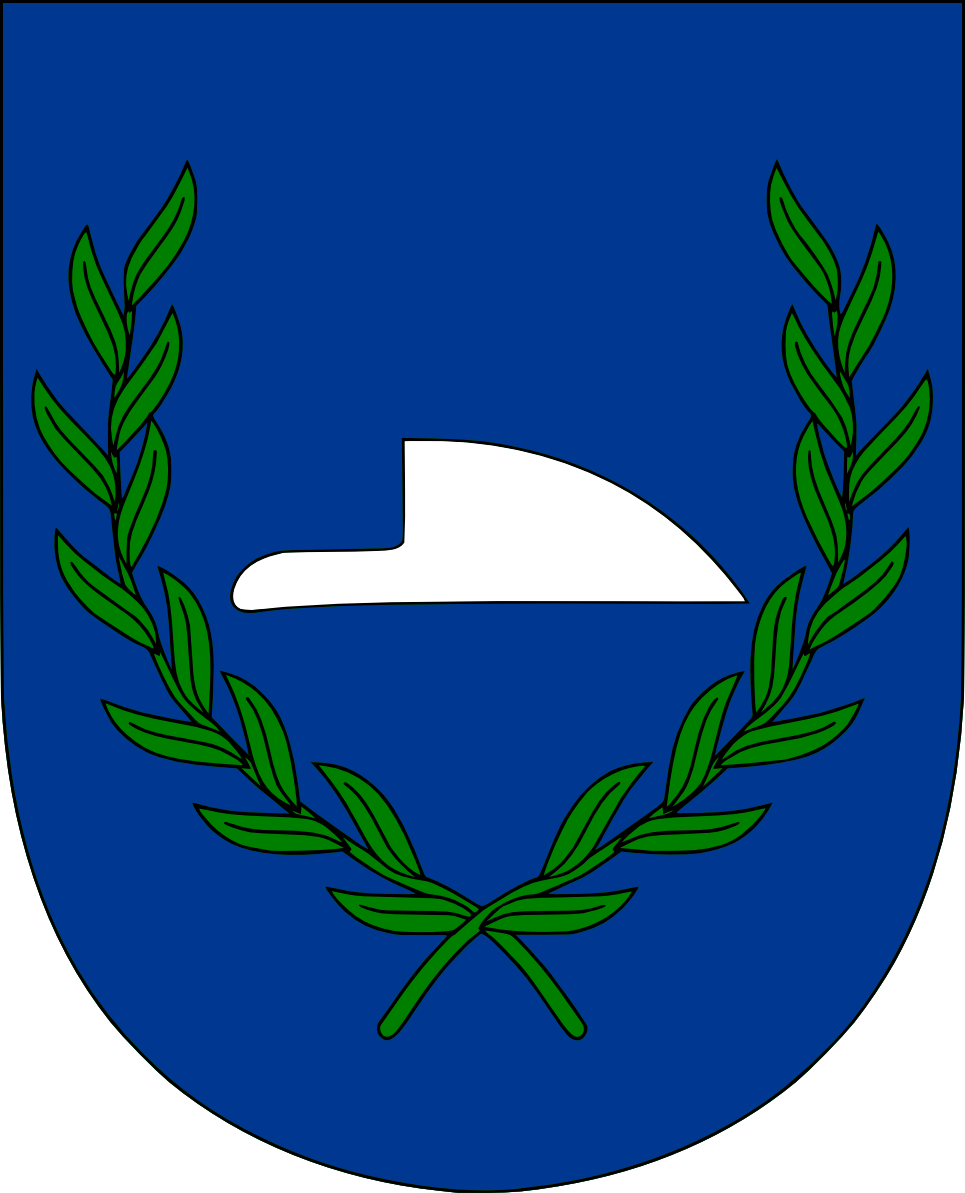
- Seal

- Location within Vojvodina Location within Serbia Location within Europe
- Coordinates: 45°07′N 19°31′E
- Country: Serbia
- Province: Vojvodina
- Region: Syrmia
- District: Srem
- Municipality: Sremska Mitrovica

Population (2002)
  - Total: 1,585
- Time zone: UTC+1 (CET)
  - Summer (DST): UTC+2 (CEST)

Divoš (Serbian Cyrillic: Дивош) is a village located in the Sremska Mitrovica municipality, in the Syrmia District of Serbia. It is situated in the autonomous province of Vojvodina. The village has a Serb ethnic majority and its population numbering 1,585 people (2002 census).

== Name ==
In Serbian, the village is known as Divoš (Дивош) and in Hungarian as Diós.

== History ==
Following Ottoman retreat from the region, the Lordship of Ilok and Upper Syrmia was established, and the village became part of its domain.

== Historical population ==
- 1961: 1,614
- 1971: 1,644
- 1981: 1,618
- 1991: 1,527

== Culture ==
Near the village there is Kuveždin Monastery, one of 16 Orthodox monasteries on Fruška Gora mountain.

== See also ==
- List of places in Serbia
- List of cities, towns and villages in Vojvodina
