= FK Omladinac Novi Banovci =

Serbian football club

Omladinac Novi Banovci
- Full name: Fudbalski Klub Omladinac Novi Banovci
- Founded: 1 September 1947; 78 years ago
- Ground: Stadion FK Omladinac, Novi Banovci
- Capacity: 500
- President: Milan Beara
- Head coach: Zdravko Trivković
- League: Serbian League Vojvodina
- 2024–25: Serbian League Vojvodina, 6th of 16
Home colours	Away colours

FK Omladinac Novi Banovci (Serbian Cyrillic: ФК Омладинац Нови Бановци) is a football club based in Novi Banovci, Vojvodina, Serbia. They compete in the Serbian League Vojvodina, the third tier of the national league system.

== History ==
The first football game in Novi Banovci was held on 1 September 1947, which is considered to be the club's foundation date. They spent six seasons in the fourth tier of Serbian football, before earning promotion to the Serbian League Vojvodina in 2015.

== Honours ==
Novi Sad-Srem Zone League (Tier 4)

- 2014–15

== Seasons ==
Season	League									Cup
Season	Division	Pld	W	D	L	GF	GA	Pts	Pos	Cup
Serbia
2010–11	4 – Vojvodina West	30	11	8	11	58	50	41	8th	—
2011–12	4 – Vojvodina West	30	12	9	9	34	28	45	7th	—
2012–13	4 – Vojvodina West	30	11	6	13	35	36	39	9th	—
2013–14	4 – Vojvodina West	28	15	6	7	44	23	51	3rd	—
2014–15	4 – Novi Sad-Srem	30	22	1	7	62	26	67	1st	—
2015–16	3 – Vojvodina	30	8	11	11	31	34	35	13th	—
2016–17	3 – Vojvodina	28	19	3	6	52	28	60	2nd	—
2017–18	3 – Vojvodina	30	13	5	12	49	38	44	7th	—
2018–19	3 – Vojvodina	32	16	4	12	38	34	52	3rd	—
2019–20	3 – Vojvodina	17 (Note: The season was cut short due to the COVID-19 pandemic in Serbia.)	5	7	5	14	17	22	9th	—
2020–21	3 – Vojvodina	38	16	13	9	57	32	61	6th	—
2021–22	3 – Vojvodina	30	14	3	13	51	38	45	6th	—
2022–23	3 – Vojvodina	28	10	11	7	45	29	41	5th	—
2023–24	3 – Vojvodina	30	13	6	11	34	35	45	7th	—
2024–25	3 – Vojvodina	30	14	6	10	43	27	48	6th	—

== Players ==
For the list of former and current players with Wikipedia article, please see: Category:FK Omladinac Novi Banovci players.

== Historical list of coaches ==
- (Serbia) Goran Dragoljić
- (Serbia) Dragan Stevanović (2016–2018)
- (Serbia) Miodrag Radisavljević (2018)
- (Serbia) Pavle Buna (2019)
- (Serbia) Dragan Stevanović (2019–2020)
- (Serbia) Jovan Golić (2020–2021)
- (Serbia) Branislav Bajić (2021)
- (Serbia) Dragan Stevanović (2021–2022)
- (Serbia) Andrija Poljak (2022)
- (Serbia) Marko Andrejić (2022)
- (Serbia) Vladan Dimitrijević (2022–2023)
- (Montenegro) Nikola Drinčić (2022–2023)
- (Serbia) Igor Ležaić (2023)
- (Serbia) Dušan Kljajić (2023–2024)
- (Serbia) Dušan Đokić (2024)
- (Serbia) Dragan Ivanović (2025)
- (Serbia) Zdravko Trivković (2025–)
