= Bački Jarak =

Bački Jarak Бачки Јарак (Serbian)
- Town
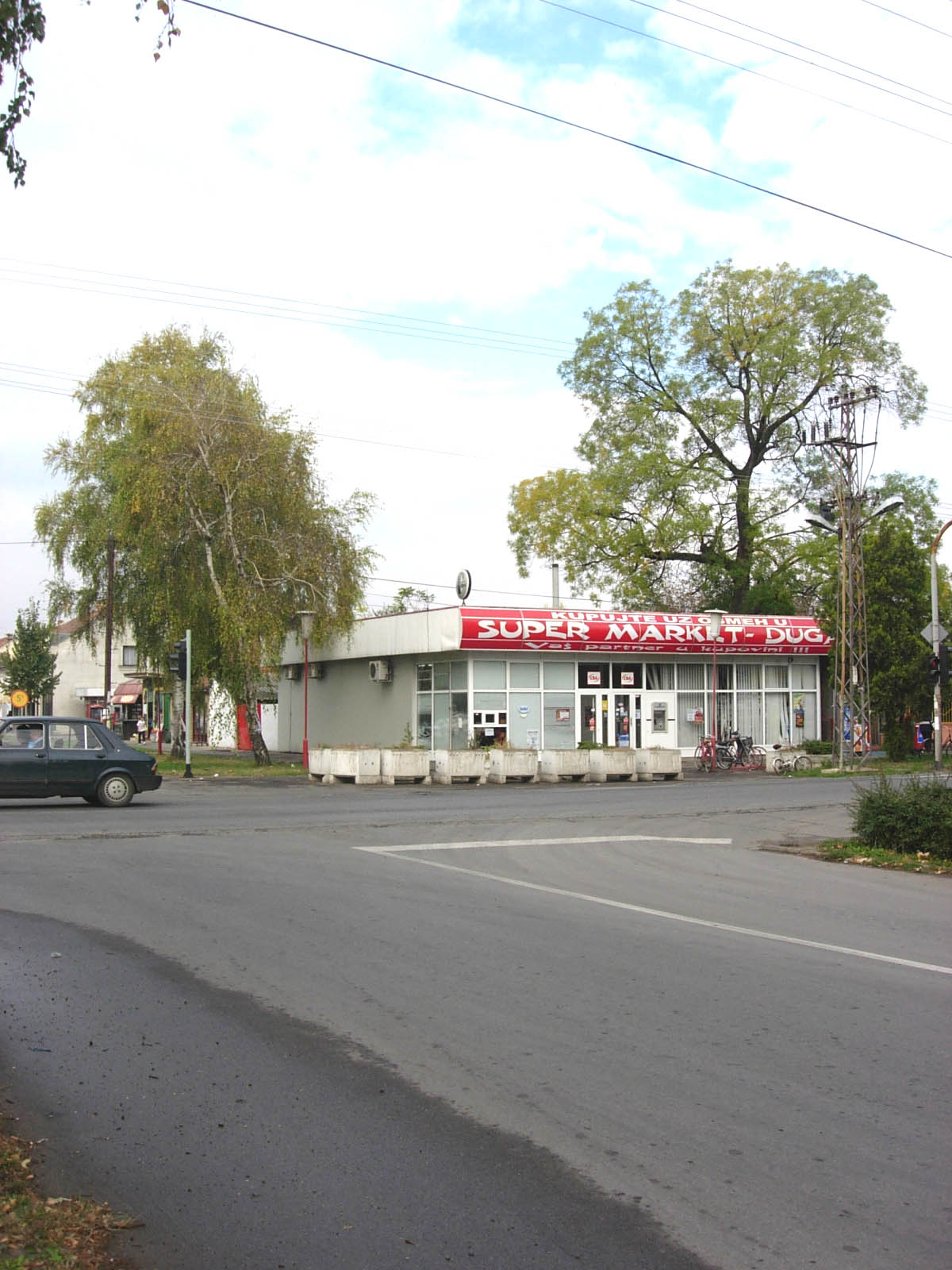
- General store in town center

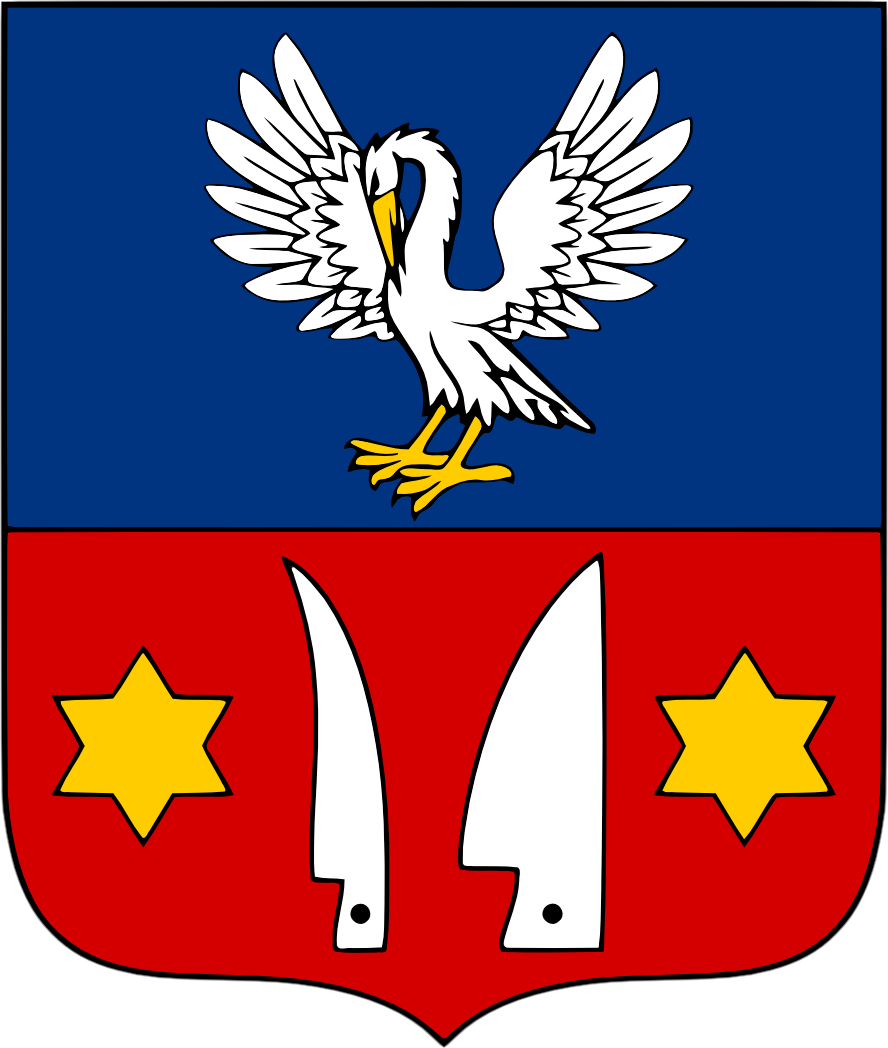
- Coat of arms

- Location within Vojvodina Location within Serbia Location within Europe
- Coordinates: 45°22′N 19°52′E
- Country: Serbia
- Province / Region: Vojvodina
- District: South Bačka District
- Municipality or city: Temerin

Area
  - Total: 19.1 km^{2} (7.4 sq mi)

Population (2011)
  - Total: 6 769
- Postal code: 21234
- Area code: + 381(0) 21
- Car plates: NS

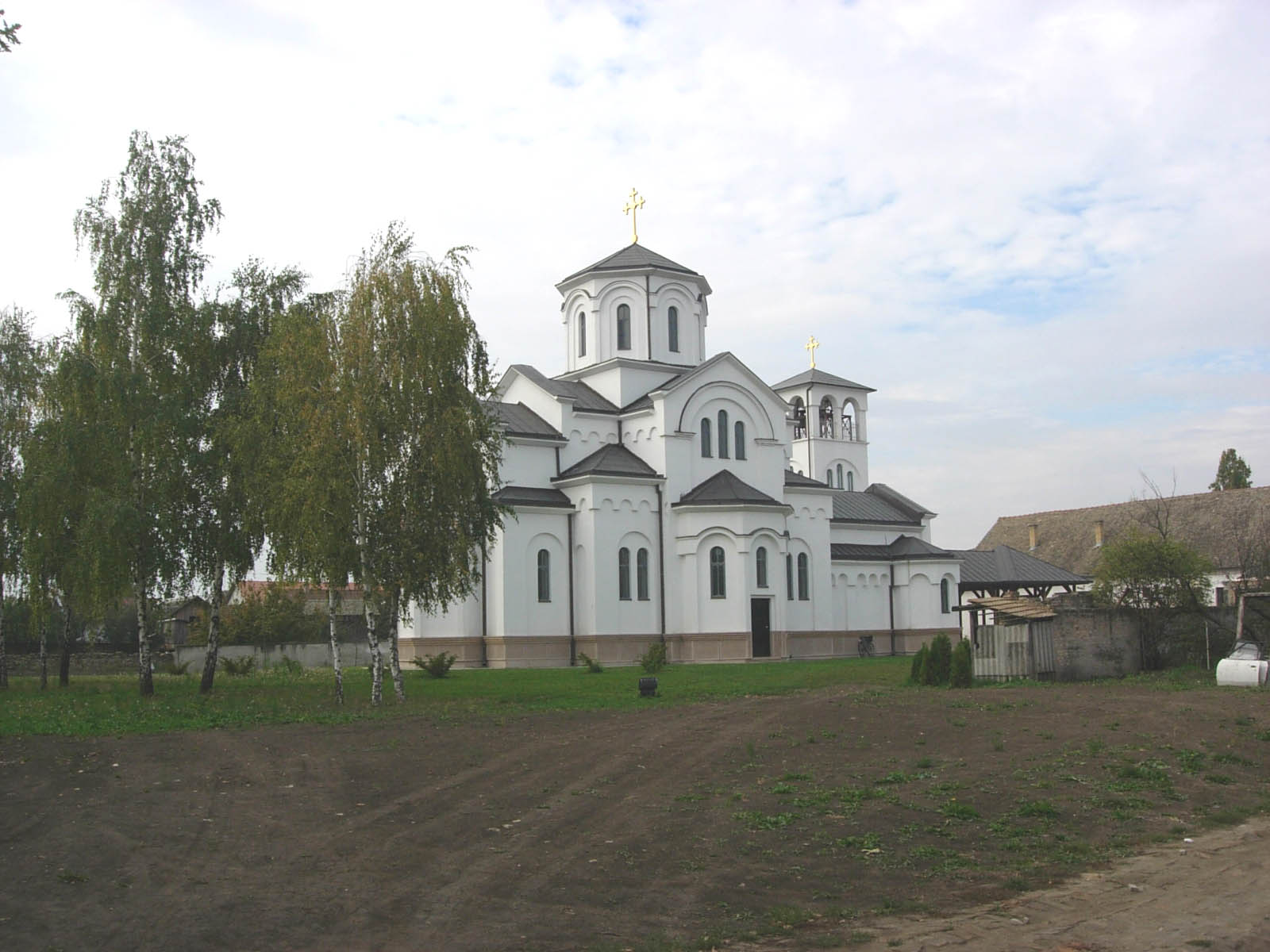
The new Orthodox church.

Bački Jarak (Serbian Cyrillic: Бачки Јарак) is a town located in the Temerin municipality, in the South Bačka District of Serbia. It is situated in the Autonomous Province of Vojvodina. The town has a Serb ethnic majority and its population numbering 5,687 people (2011 census).

== Name ==
In Serbian, the town is known as Bački Jarak (Бачки Јарак), formerly also Mali Jarak (Мали Јарак) and Jarak (Јарак); in German as Jarek, Batschki Jarak or Jarmosch; in Hungarian as Jármos or Tiszaistvánfalva; and in Croatian as Bački Jarak.

Its name is derived from Serbian noun jarak (coming from Turkish ark; "ditch" or "trench" in English), while adjective bački refers to its location in the region of Bačka.

== History ==
In 1267, there is mention of a place named Irig or Irišac. According to some opinions, this place was maybe located in the area of present-day Bački Jarak. This settlement was also recorded in 1703, while records from 1737 mention the existence of two settlements: Veliki Irišac and Mali Irišac. Both settlements belonged to the Futog seigniory.

The modern settlement was founded and settled by Evangelical Protestant ethnic Germans (Danube Swabians) in 1787 (before that, the place used to be barren area). In 1788, the settlement had 117 houses and population of 268 people. Administratively, the settlement was part of the Batsch-Bodrog County within the Habsburg Kingdom of Hungary. In 1796, Temerin and Bački Jarak were sold to Count Sándor Széchényi for a price of 80,000 forints.

In 1848–1849, the settlement was part of autonomous Serbian Vojvodina and in 1849–1860 part of the Voivodeship of Serbia and Banat of Temeschwar, a separate Habsburg crown land. It was part of the Batschka-Torontal District (1849–1850) and Neusatz District (1850–1860) within the voivodeship. After the abolishment of the voivodeship in 1860, the settlement was again included into Batsch-Bodrog County. In the 1910 census, a majority of settlement inhabitants spoke the German language.

In 1918, the settlement (as part of the Banat, Bačka and Baranja region) firstly became part of the Kingdom of Serbia and then part of the Kingdom of Serbs, Croats and Slovenes (later renamed to Yugoslavia). In 1918–19, the settlement was part of the Banat, Bačka and Baranja region and also (from 1918 to 1922) part of the Novi Sad district. From 1922 to 1929, the settlement was part of the Bačka Oblast and from 1929 to 1941 part of the Danube Banovina. From 1941 to 1944, the settlement was under Axis occupation and was attached to Horthy's Hungary. Since 1944, the town is part of autonomous Yugoslav Vojvodina, which (from 1945) was part of new socialist Serbia within Yugoslavia.

In 1944, as a consequence of World War II events in Yugoslavia, one part of 2,000 Yugoslav citizens of German ethnicity left from the area, together with defeated German army. Those who remained in the area were sent to communist prison camps and one of such camps was located in Bački Jarak. After prison camps were dissolved (in 1946), most of the remaining German population left Yugoslavia in subsequent decades, mainly because of economic reasons. In 1946–1947, Bački Jarak was settled by (mainly ethnic Serb) migrants from Bosnia and Herzegovina (Bosnian Krajina) and Croatia (Lika). Post-World War II population censuses recorded Serb ethnic majority in the town.

Some of the old houses of the German families, built vertically towards the road (na duž) and known as the Swabian houses, still survive. The remaining houses, though mainly from the 19th century, were designed in the Josephinism style which originated in the second half of the 18th century, during the rule of emperor Joseph II. Family names were written on the façades and some are still visible, like that of Johann Wallrabenstein, who is described in chronicles as a "distinguished householder". As both Bački Jarak and Temerin developed in recent decades, they now form one continuously built-up area.

== Demographics ==
Historical population
Year	Pop.	±%
1921	2,311	—
1948	2,438	+5.5%
1953	2,544	+4.3%
1961	3,362	+32.2%
1971	3,858	+14.8%
1981	5,396	+39.9%
1991	5,426	+0.6%
2002	6,049	+11.5%
2011	5,687	−6.0%

Ethnic groups (2002 census):

- Serbs = 5,838
- Hungarians = 43
- Croats = 30
- Yugoslavs = 22
- Rusyns = 13
- Macedonians = 11
- Slovaks = 10
- Germans = 7
- others

== Sport ==
Popular sports in Bački Jarak are football, handball, table tennis and karate. Mladost currently competes in Serbian League Vojvodina, Serbian football's third level.

== Notable people ==
- Dejan Meleg, football player
- Milan Lukač, football player
- Damir Drinić, football player
- Mirko Ivanić, football player

== See also ==
- List of places in Serbia
- List of cities, towns and villages in Vojvodina
