= 2010–11 Serbian League Vojvodina =

Following are the results of the 2010–11 Serbian League Vojvodina season. The Serbian League Vojvodina is a section of the Serbian League, Serbia's third football league. Teams from Vojvodina are in this section of the league. The other sections are Serbian League East, Serbian League West, and Serbian League Belgrade.

== Teams ==
- FK Cement Beočin
- FK ČSK Čelarevo
- FK Dolina Padina
- FK Donji Srem
- OFK Kikinda
- FK Mladost Apatin
- FK Mladost Bački Jarak
- FK Palić
- FK Radnički Nova Pazova
- FK Senta
- FK Sloboda Novi Kozarci
- FK Sloga Temerin
- FK Solunac Rastina
- FK Tekstilac Odžaci
- FK Veternik
- FK Vršac

== League table ==
| Pos | Team | Pld | W | D | L | GF | GA | GD | Pts | Promotion or relegation |
|---|---|---|---|---|---|---|---|---|---|---|
| 1 | Donji Srem | 30 | 18 | 8 | 4 | 49 | 19 | +30 | 62 | Promoted to Serbian First League |
| 2 | Veternik | 30 | 16 | 11 | 3 | 51 | 30 | +21 | 59 | |
| 3 | Senta | 30 | 16 | 7 | 7 | 56 | 24 | +32 | 55 | |
| 4 | Radnički Nova Pazova | 30 | 16 | 8 | 6 | 44 | 21 | +23 | 55 (Note: Deducted one point because of unknown reasons) | |
| 5 | Cement Beočin | 30 | 15 | 8 | 7 | 50 | 26 | +24 | 53 | |
| 6 | ČSK Čelarevo | 30 | 13 | 9 | 8 | 49 | 33 | +16 | 48 | |
| 7 | Dolina Padina | 30 | 13 | 7 | 10 | 35 | 39 | −4 | 46 | |
| 8 | Vršac | 30 | 10 | 12 | 8 | 32 | 31 | +1 | 42 | |
| 9 | Tekstilac Odžaci | 30 | 10 | 9 | 11 | 42 | 44 | −2 | 39 | |
| 10 | Sloga Temerin | 30 | 10 | 8 | 12 | 49 | 34 | +15 | 38 | |
| 11 | OFK Kikinda | 30 | 8 | 10 | 12 | 34 | 53 | −19 | 34 | |
| 12 | Mladost Bački Jarak | 30 | 10 | 4 | 16 | 37 | 52 | −15 | 34 | |
| 13 | Solunac Rastina | 30 | 9 | 7 | 14 | 31 | 42 | −11 | 34 | Relegated to Serbian Zone League |
| 14 | Palić | 30 | 9 | 6 | 15 | 33 | 40 | −7 | 33 | |
| 15 | Mladost Apatin | 30 | 2 | 7 | 21 | 20 | 67 | −47 | 12 | Relegated to Serbian Zone League |
| 16 | Sloboda Novi Kozarci | 30 | 3 | 3 | 24 | 31 | 88 | −57 | 11 | Relegated to Serbian Zone League |
