= PFL Novi Sad =

- Country: Serbia
- Province: Vojvodina
- Region: Bačka
- Number of clubs: 16
- Level on pyramid: 5
- Promotion to: Novi Sad-Srem Zone League
- Relegation to: Novi Sad Football League; Vrbas-Titel-Žabalj Intermunicipal League; Bačka Palanka Municipality League
- Domestic cup: Serbian Cup
- Current champions: ŽSK Žabalj (2013-14)
- Website: https://fsgns.rs/

Područna fudbalska liga Novi Sad (Serbian Cyrillic: Подручна фудбалска лига Нови Сад), commonly known as PFL Novi Sad, is a section of the District Leagues, Serbia's fifth football league. The league is operated by the Football Association of the City of Novi Sad.

PFL Novi Sad consists of 16 clubs from South Bačka District who play each other in a double round-robin league, with each club playing the other club home and away. At the end of the season the top club will be promoted to the Novi Sad-Srem Zone League.

== Champions history ==
Season	Number of clubs	Champion	Points	Runner-up	Points	Third-placed	Points
2008/09	17	FK Šajkaš, Kovilj	71	FK Indeks, Novi Sad	66	FK Omladinac, Stepanovićevo	61
2009/10	16	FK Obilić, Zmajevo	62	OFK Slavija, Novi Sad	48	FK Mladost, Bački Petrovac	47
2010/11	16	FK Mladost, Bački Petrovac	69	FK Kabel, Novi Sad	61	FK Hercegovac, Gajdobra	47
2011/12	16	FK Srbobran, Srbobran	59	FK Borac, Šajkaš	52	FK Kabel, Novi Sad	48
2012/13	16	OFK Vrbas, Vrbas	63	FK Kabel, Novi Sad	50	FK TSK, Temerin	50
2013/14	16	FK ŽSK, Žabalj	79	FK Kabel, Novi Sad	68	FK Budućnost, Gložan	55

== See also ==
- Serbian SuperLiga
- Serbian First League
- Serbian League
- Vojvodina League West
- Serbian Zone League
- Novi Sad Football League
