= FK Crvena Zvezda Novi Sad =

FK Crvena zvezda
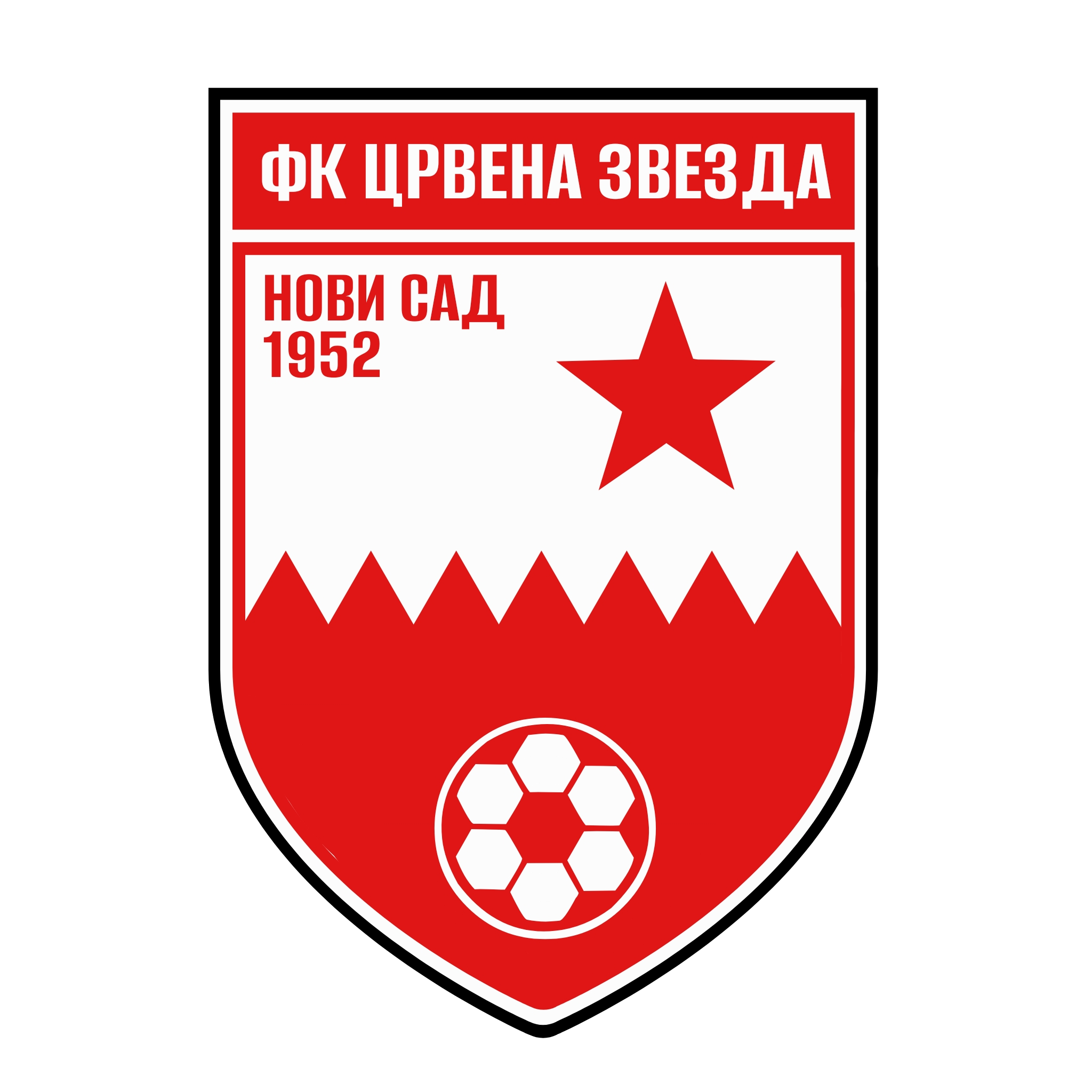
- Full name: Fudbalski Klub Crvena zvezda
- Founded: 1952; 74 years ago
- Ground: Stadion kraj Najlon pijace, Novi Sad
- League: Novi Sad First League
- 2024-25: Novi Sad Second League, 4th (promoted)
Home colours	Away colours

FK Crvena zvezda is a Serbian football club based in Novi Sad. As of 2025/26 season, they play in Novi Sad First League (5th rank of Serbian football leagues).

The club was established in 1952. Ever since, they play on the same field in Vidovdansko Naselje neighborhood.

== Recent league history ==
Season	Division	P	W	D	L	F	A	Pts	Pos
2020–21	4 - Vojvodina League South	34	8	9	17	47	52	33	15th
2021–22	5 - PFL Novi Sad	30	8	7	15	49	62	31	10th
2022–23	5 - Novi Sad First League	30	13	5	12	52	42	44	7th
2023–24	5 - Novi Sad First League	28	9	5	14	52	56	32	12th
2024–25	6 - Novi Sad Second League	30	19	4	7	90	39	61	4th
