= FK Indeks Novi Sad =

FK Index
- Full name: Fudbalski Klub Index
- Nickname: Studenti
- Founded: 1972; 54 years ago
- Ground: Đačko igralište, Novi Sad, Serbia
- Capacity: 538
- Chairman: Aleksandar Bogdanović
- League: Vojvodina League South
- 2024–25: Novi Sad First League, 1st (promoted)
Home colours	Away colours

FK Index is a Serbian football club based in Novi Sad, Serbia.

Their football stadium "Đačko igralište" is located in the Liman neighborhood in the city centre. For the 2012/13 season, the club competed in Pioneer League of Vojvodina (PLV) with 15 wins. As of the 2025/26 season, they compete in the 4th-tier Vojvodina League South.

== Recent league history ==
Season	Division	P	W	D	L	F	A	Pts	Pos
2020–21	4 - Vojvodina League South	34	15	7	12	56	47	52	7th
2021–22	4 - Vojvodina League South	30	10	5	15	38	45	35	14th
2022–23	4 - Vojvodina League South	30	13	2	15	45	56	41	7th
2023–24	4 - Vojvodina League South	30	8	1	21	34	74	25	15th
2024–25	5 - Novi Sad First League	30	25	4	1	112	25	79	1st
