= FK Veternik =

- Full name: Fudbalski klub Veternik
- Founded: 1977; 49 years ago
- Ground: Stadion FK Veternik
- Capacity: 2,980
- Chairman: Milan Jovanović
- Manager: Boban Dašić
- League: Serbian League Vojvodina
- 2024-25: Vojvodina League South, 3rd (promoted)
Home colours	Away colours

FK Veternik (Serbian Cyrillic: ФК Ветерник) is a football club based in Novi Sad, Vojvodina, Serbia. As of the 2025-26 season, they compete in the 3rd-tier Serbian League Vojvodina.

== History ==
The club was formed in 1977 along with the creation of Vujadin Boškov sports center. Until the 1990s, the club mostly played in local lower leagues and the squad is formed mostly by local players. In the season 1997–98 the club reached for first time the 3rd league level, the Serbian League Vojvodina. In 2000 the club formed the football school where hundreds of young players begin their first steps in this sport. The club's school has participated in numerous tournaments in Serbia and in Europe.

In 2001, the club achieved its major sports achievement, the promotion to the Second League of FR Yugoslavia. Between 2001 and 2003, was also undertaken a major infrastructural development. Until nowadays numerous national and international players passed through the club, and the club officials feed the ambition to bring the club to compete in the top tiers.

== Recent league history ==
Season	Division	P	W	D	L	F	A	Pts	Pos
2020–21	5 - PFL Novi Sad	34	27	4	3	140	24	85	1st
2021–22	4 - Vojvodina League South	30	10	7	13	41	53	37	11th
2022–23	4 - Vojvodina League South	30	9	7	14	35	47	34	11th
2023–24	4 - Vojvodina League South	30	11	5	14	36	44	38	9th
2024–25	4 - Vojvodina League South	32	23	5	4	81	28	74	3rd

== Notable players ==
This is a list of club players with national team appearances:

- (Serbia) Milan Jovanić
- (Serbia) Aleksandar Sedlar
- (Dominican Republic) Edward Acevedo Cruz
- (Dominican Republic) Kerbi Rodríguez
- (Hungary) Predrag Bošnjak

For the list of former and current players with Wikipedia article, please see: Category:FK Veternik players.
