= FK Mladost Bački Jarak =

Mladost Bački Jarak
- Full name: Fudbalski Klub Mladost Bački Jarak
- Founded: 1947; 79 years ago
- Ground: Stadion Livadica, Bački Jarak
- Capacity: 1,000
- Chairman: Dragan Antonić
- Manager: Darko Puškarić
- League: Serbian League Vojvodina
- 2024–25: Vojvodina League South, 2nd (promoted)
Home colours	Away colours

FK Mladost Bački Jarak (Serbian Cyrillic: ФК Младост Бачки Јарак) is a football club based in Bački Jarak, Temerin, Serbia. Mladost currently plays in the Serbian League Vojvodina, the 3rd tier of Serbian football.

== History ==
FK Mladost was founded in 1947. The club's biggest success came in the 1990s, when Mladost played in the First League of FR Yugoslavia in the B group in 1995-96 and 1997. Since relegation from the B league, the club spent most of its time in third tier of Serbian football. Mladost almost reached the 2nd-tier Serbian First League in the 2008–09 season, when the club was leading the promotion race until the final few games, but they failed to promote, finishing third, six points behind Proleter Novi Sad. After many years in third tier, the club was relegated in season 2012–13. They had played in the Novi Sad-Srem Zone League, later called the Vojvodina League South since.

On 8 June 2016 Mladost won the Vojvodina Cup for the first time in club history, beating Borac Sakule 4–2 on penalties (0–0 after 90 minutes), and qualified for Serbian Cup 1/16 finals. This is considered as the biggest success in modern history of the club. The match was played at Karađorđe Stadium in Novi Sad.

== Recent league history ==
Season	Division	P	W	D	L	F	A	Pts	Pos
2020–21	4 - Vojvodina League South	34	14	6	14	66	53	48	10th
2021–22	4 - Vojvodina League South	30	10	6	14	34	52	36	13th
2022–23	4 - Vojvodina League South	30	9	6	15	31	47	33	14th
2023–24	4 - Vojvodina League South	30	14	4	12	47	44	46	4th
2024–25	4 - Vojvodina League South	30	23	5	2	60	19	74	2nd

== Rivalries ==
FK Mladost main rival is FK Sloga Temerin. They are local rivals. Two stadiums are separated by only 3 km.

== Fans ==
Supporters of FK Mladost are called Plavi Djavoli (The Blue Devils).
