= FK Senta =

Association football club in Serbia

- Full name: Fudbalski klub Senta
- Nickname: Yellows
- Founded: 1905; 121 years ago
- Ground: Gradski stadion, Senta
- Capacity: 2,050
- Coordinates: 45°56′16.8″N 20°05′01.4″E
- Chairman: István Bajusz
- Manager: Branislav Bulatović
- League: PFL Subotica
- 2024-25: PFL Subotica, 4th
- Website: fksenta.com
Home colours	Away colours

FK Senta (Serbian Cyrillic: ФК Сента) is a football club based in Senta, Serbia. The club currently competes in the PFL Subotica, in the 5th tier of Serbian football.

== History ==
The club was formed in 1905 as ZAK, Zentai AK (Zentai Atletikai Klub). At the end of the First World War, the region of Bačka become part of the Kingdom of Serbs, Croats and Slovenes, renamed into Yugoslavia in 1929 and the club competed in the Subotica Football Subassociation.

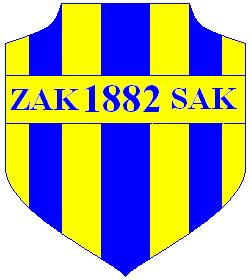
Zentai Atlétikai Klub - Szentai Atlétikai Klub

In the Second World War, Hungary took control over Senta, and the club competes in the Hungarian Second League, finishing in 11th in season 1941/42, 12th in season 1942/43 and 9th in season 1943/44.

In 1945 Senta would be part of Yugoslavia again, and the club achieved its major success between 1950 and 1952 when playing in the Serbian Republic League, one of the six regional third national tier leagues. Afterwards and during the 1960s the club competed in the Vojvodina League (4th national tier). Several well-known footballers had played in the club, the most famous being Novak Roganović, a Yugoslav Olympic player in the 1962 Olympic games held in Rome. Another very famous player, Mladen Krstajić had his first senior appearances in this club, having afterwards continued his career playing with OFK Kikinda, FK Partizan, Schalke 04 and Werder Bremen. In more recent times the club has usually competed in the Serbian League Vojvodina, the 3rd national tier.

=== Recent league history ===
Season	Division	P	W	D	L	F	A	Pts	Pos
2020–21	5 - PFL Subotica	30	24	4	2	96	28	76	1st
2021–22	4 - Vojvodina League North	30	13	7	10	52	32	46	6th
2022–23	4 - Vojvodina League North	30	11	2	17	54	81	35	15th
2023–24	5 - PFL Subotica	30	14	3	13	50	53	45	9th
2024–25	5 - PFL Subotica	30	15	7	8	61	42	52	4th

== Players ==
For the list of former and current players with Wikipedia article, please see: Category:FK Senta players.
