= 2013–14 Serbian League Vojvodina =

Following are the results of the 2013–14 Serbian League Vojvodina season. The Serbian League Vojvodina is a section of the Serbian League, Serbia's third football league. Teams from Vojvodina are in this section of the league. The other sections are Serbian League East, Serbian League West, and Serbian League Belgrade.

== Teams ==
- FK Banat Zrenjanin
- FK Bačka 1901
- OFK Bačka
- FK ČSK Čelarevo
- FK Dinamo Pančevo
- FK Dunav Stari Banovci
- FK Jedinstvo Novi Bečej
- FK Novi Sad
- FK Palić
- FK Radnički Nova Pazova
- FK Radnički Sombor
- FK Radnički Sremska Mitrovica
- FK Radnički Šid
- FK Senta
- FK Sloga Temerin
- FK Tekstilac Odžaci

== League table ==
Pos	Team	Pld	W	D	L	GF	GA	GD	Pts	Promotion or relegation
1	Bačka (BP)	30	17	6	7	49	26	+23	57	Promoted to Serbian First League
2	Dinamo Pančevo	30	14	14	2	45	13	+32	56	
3	ČSK Čelarevo	30	14	12	4	50	21	+29	54	
4	Radnički Sremska Mitrovica	30	13	8	9	35	32	+3	47	
5	Dunav Stari Banovci	30	13	7	10	42	29	+13	46	
6	Senta	30	12	10	8	39	33	+6	46	
7	Radnički Šid	30	11	10	9	43	38	+5	43	
8	Sloga Temerin	30	10	10	10	45	39	+6	40	
9	Banat	30	10	7	13	27	30	−3	37	
10	Radnički Nova Pazova	30	10	7	13	25	36	−11	37	
11	Bačka 1901	30	10	6	14	31	39	−8	36	
12	Palić	30	9	8	13	25	30	−5	35	
13	Radnički Sombor	30	9	8	13	28	45	−17	35	
14	Tekstilac Odžaci	30	10	4	16	28	52	−24	34	Relegated to Zone Leagues
15	Jedinstvo Novi Bečej	30	6	8	16	27	55	−28	26	Relegated to Zone Leagues
16	Novi Sad	30	6	7	17	22	43	−21	25	Relegated to Zone Leagues
