= Serbian League Vojvodina =

- Founded: 1995
- Country: Serbia (2006–present); Serbia and Montenegro (1995–2006)
- Number of clubs: 16
- Level on pyramid: 3
- Promotion to: Serbian First League
- Relegation to: Vojvodina League East; Vojvodina League North; Vojvodina League South
- Domestic cup: Serbian Cup
- Current champions: Naftagas Elemir (2025–26)
- Most championships: ČSK Čelarevo; Kabel (2 titles)
- Current: 2024–25 season

Serbian League Vojvodina (Serbian: Српска лига Војводина / Srpska liga Vojvodina) is one of four sections of the Serbian League, the third tier of professional football in Serbia. The other three sections are Serbian League Belgrade, Serbian League East, and Serbian League West. It began as the "Vojvodina League" in 1958 and obtain the current form in 1995.

== Seasons ==
Vojvodina League (1958–1962)

Season	Winner	2nd place	3rd place
1958–59	Radnički Kikinda	Rusanda Melenci	Radnik Vrbas
1959–60	Dinamo Pančevo	OFK Bačka	Bratstvo-Jedinstvo Bečej
1960–61	Bratstvo-Jedinstvo Bečej	Železničar Inđija	Proleter Zrenjanin
1961–62	Odred Kikinda	OFK Bačka	OFK Subotica

Serbian League North (1962–1968)

Season	Winner	2nd place	3rd place
1962–63	Radnički Sombor	Tekstilac Odžaci	Odred Kikinda
1963–64	Voždovački	Odred Kikinda	Hajduk Kula
1964–65	Radnički Sombor	Železnik	Zvezda Subotica
1965–66	Crvenka	Sloven Ruma	Dinamo Pančevo
1966–67	Srem	Novi Sad	Jedinstvo Zemun
1967–68	Novi Sad	Radnički Beograd	Dinamo Pančevo

Vojvodina League (1968–1988)

Season	Winner	2nd place	3rd place
1968–69	Hajduk Kula	ŽAK Kikinda	Bečej
1969–70	Hajduk Kula	Srem	Sloven Ruma
1970–71	Srem	Vrbas	Sloven Ruma
1971–72	Radnički Sombor	Vrbas	Sloven Ruma
1972–73	Vrbas	Polet Kikinda	Bačka 1901
1973–74	Vrbas	Radnički Zrenjanin	Kikinda
1974–75	Spartak Subotica	Kikinda	Bačka 1901
1975–76	Kikinda	Bačka 1901	Kozara Banatsko Veliko Selo
1976–77	Vrbas	Radnički Bajmok	Srem
1977–78	Spartak Subotica	AIK Bačka Topola	Dinamo Pančevo
1978–79	Vrbas	Crvenka	AIK Bačka Topola
1979–80	AIK Bačka Topola	OFK Bačka	Radnički Bajmok
1980–81	Kikinda	Novi Sad	Srem
1981–82	Novi Sad	Vrbas	Mladost Apatin
1982–83	Vrbas	Jedinstvo Novi Bečej	Dinamo Pančevo
1983–84	Crvenka	Radnički Sombor	OFK Bačka
1984–85	AIK Bačka Topola	Radnički Sombor	Dinamo Pančevo
1985–86	Dinamo Pančevo	Kabel	Crvenka
1986–87	Kabel	AIK Bačka Topola	Crvenka
1987–88	OFK Bačka	AIK Bačka Topola	Vrbas

Inter-Republic League North (1988–1992)

Season	Winner	2nd place	3rd place	4th place
1988–89	Zemun	Rudar Kostolac	Vrbas	AIK Bačka Topola
1989–90	Radnički Beograd	Bečej	Jedinstvo Brčko	Belišće
1990–91	Bečej	Vrbas	Hajduk Kula	Drina Zvornik
1991–92	Novi Sad	Dinamo Pančevo	Agrounija Inđija	Obilić

Serbian League North (1992–1995)

Season	Winner	2nd place	3rd place
1992–93	Čukarički	Mladost Bački Jarak	Srem
1993–94	Hajduk Beograd	Zvezdara	Voždovac
1994–95	Železnik	Beograd	Zvezdara

Serbian League Vojvodina (1995–present)

Season	Winner	2nd place	3rd place
1995–96	Solunac Karađorđevo	Dinamo Pančevo	Cement Beočin
1996–97	Mladost Apatin	ČSK Čelarevo	Radnički Vršac
1997–98	ČSK Čelarevo	Vrbas	Cement Beočin
1998–99	Cement Beočin	Big Bull Bačinci	Kabel
1999–2000	Mladost Lukićevo	Budućnost Banatski Dvor	Elan Srbobran
2000–01	Veternik	Solunac Karađorđevo	Srem
2001–02	Elan Srbobran	Mladost Lukićevo	Brazdakop Inđija
2002–03	Proleter Zrenjanin	ČSK Čelarevo	OFK Bačka
2003–04	Spartak Subotica	ČSK Čelarevo	Big Bull Bačinci
2004–05	Glogonj	ČSK Čelarevo	Cement Beočin
2005–06	Inđija	Bečej	OFK Bačka
2006–07	Novi Sad	Proleter Novi Sad	Palić
2007–08	Zlatibor Voda Horgoš	Inđija	Proleter Novi Sad
2008–09	Proleter Novi Sad	Radnički Sombor	Mladost Bački Jarak
2009–10	Big Bull Bačinci	Veternik	Palić
2010–11	Donji Srem	Veternik	Senta
2011–12	Radnički Nova Pazova	Sloga Temerin	ČSK Čelarevo
2012–13	Dolina Padina	Sloga Temerin	Radnički Sremska Mitrovica
2013–14	OFK Bačka	Dinamo Pančevo	ČSK Čelarevo
2014–15	ČSK Čelarevo	Senta	Bačka 1901
2015–16	OFK Odžaci	TSC	Radnički Sremska Mitrovica
2016–17	Bratstvo Prigrevica	Omladinac Novi Banovci	TSC
2017–18	Bečej 1918	Bratstvo Prigrevica	Radnički Nova Pazova
2018–19	Kabel	Hajduk 1912	Omladinac Novi Banovci
2019–20	Železničar Pančevo	Bačka 1901	Radnički Zrenjanin
2020–21	Mladost Novi Sad	OFK Vršac	Radnički 1912
2021–22	OFK Vršac	Feniks 1995	Borac Šajkaš
2022–23	Tekstilac Odžaci	Borac Šajkaš	Naftagas Elemir
2023–24	Železničar Inđija	Sloven Ruma	Radnički Zrenjanin
2024–25	Kabel	Sloboda Donji Tovarnik	Hajduk Divoš
2025–26	Naftagas Elemir	Železničar Inđija	Jedinstvo Stara Pazova

== Members for 2026–27 ==
Locations of the 2026–27 Serbian League Vojvodina clubs
1 Dinamo 1945
2 GFK Sloven
3 Hajduk Divoš
4 Index
5 Jedinstvo
6 Kabel
7 Mladost
8 OFK Bačka
9 OFK Gradnulica
10 OFK Mladost APA
11 OFK Vrbas
12 Sloboda
13 Sloga
14 Tekstilac
15 Veternik
16 Železničar

The following 16 clubs compete in the Serbian League Vojvodina during the 2026–27 season. Previous-season positions refer to the 2025–26 Serbian League Vojvodina unless otherwise indicated.

Club	Location	2025–26 position
Dinamo 1945	Pančevo	8th
GFK Sloven	Ruma	5th
Hajduk Divoš	Divoš	4th
Index	Novi Sad	1st (Vojvodina League South)
Jedinstvo	Stara Pazova	3rd
Kabel	Novi Sad	12th (Serbian First League)
Mladost	Bački Jarak	7th
OFK Bačka	Bačka Palanka	10th
OFK Gradnulica	Zrenjanin	1st (Vojvodina League East)
OFK Mladost APA	Apatin	1st (Vojvodina League North)
OFK Vrbas	Vrbas	9th
Sloboda	Donji Tovarnik	6th
Sloga	Čonoplja	12th
Tekstilac	Odžaci	11th (Serbian First League)
Veternik	Veternik	11th
Železničar	Inđija	2nd

== See also ==
- Serbian League Belgrade
- Serbian League East
- Serbian League West
