= FK Sloga Temerin =

- Full name: Fudbalski klub Sloga Temerin
- Nickname: Crveni
- Founded: 1928; 98 years ago
- Ground: Stadion Fk Sloga, Temerin
- Capacity: 2,000
- Manager: Mirko Davidović
- League: Vojvodina League South
- 2024–25: Vojvodina League South, 12th
Home colours

FK Sloga Temerin (Serbian Cyrillic: ФК Слога Темерин) is a football club from Temerin, Serbia.

== History ==
The club was founded in 1928. It has been competing in the Vojvodina League South continuously since 2017.

=== Recent league history ===
Season	Division	P	W	D	L	F	A	Pts	Pos
2020–21	4 - Vojvodina League South	34	13	7	14	31	31	46	13th
2021–22	4 - Vojvodina League South	30	11	5	14	36	50	38	10th
2022–23	4 - Vojvodina League South	30	11	5	14	41	51	38	9th
2023–24	4 - Vojvodina League South	30	10	6	14	38	49	36	12th
2024–25	4 - Vojvodina League South	30	9	9	12	36	51	36	12th
