= List of Serbian football transfers summer 2013 =

This is a list of transfers in Serbian football for the 2013 summer transfer window. Only moves featuring a Serbian SuperLiga side are listed. The order by which the clubs are listed is equal to the classification of the SuperLiga at the end of the previous season, 2012–13.

== Serbian SuperLiga ==
=== Partizan ===
In: Note: Flags indicate national team as defined under FIFA eligibility rules; some limited exceptions apply. Players may hold more than one non-FIFA nationality.

No.	Pos.	Nation	Player
25	GK	SRB	Milan Lukač (from OFK Beograd)
13	DF	SRB	Nikola Aksentijević (on loan from (Belgium) SBV Vitesse)
36	MF	SRB	Nikola Gulan (from (Italy) Fiorentina)
29	MF	SRB	Filip Malbašić (on loan from (Germany) TSG Hoffenheim)
24	MF	MNE	Petar Grbić (on loan from (Greece) Olympiacos)
26	DF	SRB	Milan Obradović (from (Ukraine) Metalist Kharkiv)
99	MF	CMR	Eric Djemba-Djemba (from (Israel) Hapoel Tel Aviv)
10	FW	CIV	Ismaël Béko Fofana (from (Armenia) Shirak)

Out: Note: Flags indicate national team as defined under FIFA eligibility rules; some limited exceptions apply. Players may hold more than one non-FIFA nationality.

No.	Pos.	Nation	Player
99	MF	SRB	Milan Smiljanić (to (Turkey) Gençlerbirliği)
23	DF	SRB	Tomislav Pajović (loan return to (Moldova) Sheriff)
5	DF	MNE	Žarko Tomašević (to (Belgium) Kortrijk)
8	MF	SRB	Goran Lovre (to (Iran) Esteghlal)
50	FW	SRB	Lazar Marković (to (Portugal) Benfica)
—	MF	SRB	Filip Marković (to (Portugal) Benfica, was on loan at Teleoptik)
2	DF	SRB	Aleksandar Miljković (to (Portugal) SC Braga)
18	DF	MKD	Aleksandar Lazevski (to (Ukraine) Hoverla)
—	MF	SRB	Aleksandar Davidov (to (Israel) FC Ashdod, was on loan at (Israel) Bnei Sakhnin)
—	MF	CAF	David Manga (to (Israel) Hapoel Ironi Kiryat Shmona, was on loan at (Israel) Hapoel Ramat Gan)
37	DF	MKD	Stefan Aškovski (on loan to Donji Srem)
10	MF	BRA	Eliomar (on loan to (Hungary) Kecskeméti TE)
—	FW	SRB	Stefan Šćepović (on loan to (Spain) Sporting Gijón, was on loan at (Israel) FC Ashdod)
19	DF	SRB	Branko Pauljević (on loan to Radnički Niš)
77	MF	SRB	Filip Knežević (on loan to Radnički 1923)
—	DF	MNE	Igor Zonjić (on loan to Sinđelić Beograd, was on loan at Teleoptik)
14	FW	SRB	Nikola Trujić (was on loan, now signed with Napredak Kruševac)
15	DF	BUL	Ivan Ivanov (to (Switzerland) FC Basel)
—	MF	SRB	Saša Lukić (on loan to Teleoptik)
—	DF	SRB	Miladin Stevanović (on loan to Teleoptik)
—	DF	SRB	Miroslav Bogosavac (on loan to Teleoptik)
45	FW	SRB	Aleksandar Mitrović (to (Belgium) Anderlecht)
20	MF	SRB	Dejan Babić (on loan to Sloboda Užice)
44	FW	SRB	Marko Šćepović (to (Greece) Olympiacos)
—	DF	SRB	Stefan Savić (on loan to BSK Borča, was on loan at Teleotik)

=== Red Star Belgrade ===
In: Note: Flags indicate national team as defined under FIFA eligibility rules; some limited exceptions apply. Players may hold more than one non-FIFA nationality.

No.	Pos.	Nation	Player
7	FW	SRB	Đorđe Rakić (from (Qatar) Al-Arabi)
5	DF	SRB	Nikola Mijailović (from (Russia) Amkar Perm)
11	MF	SLO	Nejc Pečnik (from (England) Sheffield Wednesday)
33	MF	SRB	Miloš Ninković (from (France) Evian Thonon Gaillard F.C.)
55	MF	SRB	Aleksandar Kovačević (from Spartak Subotica)
20	DF	PER	Miguel Araujo (from (Peru) Sport Huancayo)
30	DF	LBR	Omega Roberts (from Smederevo)
19	DF	SRB	Novak Martinović (from (China) Wuhan Zall)
99	FW	NGR	Ifeanyi Onyilo (from Javor)
84	FW	SRB	Dragan Mrđa (from (Switzerland) FC Sion)
26	MF	SRB	Goran Gogić (from Jagodina)
95	GK	SRB	Predrag Rajković (from Jagodina)
21	MF	SRB	Marko Mirić (loan return from Radnički 1923)
23	MF	SRB	Petar Đuričković (loan return from Radnički 1923)
3	DF	SRB	Ljubo Nenadić (loan return from Novi Pazar)
34	MF	SRB	Stevan Luković (loan return from (Bosnia and Herzegovina) Leotar)
31	GK	SRB	Marko Trkulja (from Sopot)
14	FW	SRB	Nikola Đorđević (loan return from Sopot)
15	MF	SRB	Nemanja Ahčin (loan return from Radnik Surdulica)
2	DF	SRB	Marko Petković (from OFK Beograd)

Out: Note: Flags indicate national team as defined under FIFA eligibility rules; some limited exceptions apply. Players may hold more than one non-FIFA nationality.

No.	Pos.	Nation	Player
5	DF	SRB	Uroš Spajić (to (France) Toulouse)
20	MF	HON	Luis Garrido (loan return to (Honduras) Olimpia)
3	DF	SRB	Nikola Petković (to (Australia) Sydney FC)
—	MF	SRB	Veljko Simić (to (Switzerland) FC Basel)
13	DF	SRB	Nikola Maksimović (loan return to (Cyprus) Apollon Limassol)
11	MF	BRA	Cadú (to (Moldova) Sheriff)
4	MF	SRB	Srđan Mijailović (to (Turkey) Kayserispor)
2	DF	SRB	Aleksandar Pantić (to (Spain) Villarreal CF)
—	MF	SRB	Slavoljub Srnić (was on loan, now signed for Čukarički)
—	MF	SRB	Dragoljub Srnić (was on loan, now signed for Čukarički)
23	DF	MNE	Stevan Reljić (to (North Macedonia) Vardar)
91	FW	SRB	Ognjen Mudrinski (to (Germany) Greuther Fürth)
32	GK	SRB	Aleksandar Kirovski (on loan to Zemun)
19	MF	SRB	Luka Milivojević (to (Belgium) Anderlecht)
77	FW	GHA	Nathaniel Asamoah (to (Ghana) Medeama SC)
44	DF	SRB	Marko Marinković (on loan to Smederevo)
18	FW	SRB	Ognjen Ožegović (on loan to Voždovac)
2	MF	SRB	Nikola Karaklajić (on loan to Voždovac)
—	FW	SRB	Nikola Rakić (to FK Smederevo, was on loan at Sopot)
—	FW	MNE	Miloš Vukić (on loan to Železnik)

=== Vojvodina ===
In: Note: Flags indicate national team as defined under FIFA eligibility rules; some limited exceptions apply. Players may hold more than one non-FIFA nationality.

No.	Pos.	Nation	Player
9	FW	SRB	Petar Škuletić (loan return from Radnički Niš)
—	MF	NED	Serginho Greene (loan return from (Cyprus) AEK Larnaca)
12	GK	CRO	Matej Delač (on loan from (England) Chelsea)
20	MF	MNE	Janko Tumbasević (from (Moldova) Dacia Chișinău)
17	FW	MNE	Stefan Denković (from (Israel) Hapoel Haifa)
99	FW	SRB	Andrija Kaluđerović (on loan from (China) Beijing Guoan)
3	DF	SRB	Nikola Leković (from Rad)
33	MF	MNE	Simon Vukčević (from (Ukraine) Karpaty Lviv)
19	DF	SRB	Jagoš Vuković (from (Netherlands) PSV)
30	GK	SRB	Zoran Popović (from Voždovac)
13	DF	MNE	Ivan Fatić (from (Italy) Chievo)
16	DF	CRO	Mario Barić (from (Croatia) Slaven Belupo)
25	GK	MNE	Marko Kordić (loan return from Bačka BP)

Out: Note: Flags indicate national team as defined under FIFA eligibility rules; some limited exceptions apply. Players may hold more than one non-FIFA nationality.

No.	Pos.	Nation	Player
27	GK	BIH	Nemanja Supić (to FK Novi Pazar)
33	MF	SRB	Aleksandar Katai (loan return to (Greece) Olympiacos)
—	GK	SRB	Aleksandar Kesić (was on loan, now signed for Radnički Niš)
—	DF	SRB	Dejan Karan (to (Hungary) Kecskeméti TE, was on loan at Voždovac)
29	MF	SRB	Goran Smiljanić (to Bežanija)
21	FW	SRB	Miloš Deletić (to Napredak Kruševac)
9	FW	SRB	Đorđe Šušnjar (to Jagodina)
—	DF	SRB	Srđan Bečelić (loan extension to (Montenegro) Sutjeska Nikšić)
—	FW	GHA	Yaw Antwi (released)
31	DF	SRB	Vladan Pavlović (to Radnički Niš)
—	DF	SRB	Vladimir Kovačević (to Spartak Subotica, previously on loan at Proleter Novi Sad)
19	DF	SRB	Stefan Nikolić (to (Montenegro) Mladost Podgorica)
20	FW	SRB	Milan Spremo (on loan to Sloga Petrovac)
—	DF	SRB	Stefan Cvijić (to (Germany) 1. FC Garmisch)
—	MF	SRB	Nemanja Živković (to (Montenegro) Mladost Podgorica, from youth squad)
14	FW	CMR	Aboubakar Oumarou (to (Belgium) Waasland-Beveren)
—	GK	SRB	Stefan Mijatović (to (Montenegro) Bratstvo Cijevna, was on loan at (Montenegro) Obilić Herceg Novi)
4	MF	SRB	Mirko Ivanić (loan extension to Proleter Novi Sad)
25	GK	MNE	Marko Kordić (on loan to Bačka BP)
28	MF	NGR	Nnaemeka Ajuru (to (Georgia (country)) Zestafoni)
3	DF	SRB	Milovan Petrić (to Metalac GM, was on loan at RFK Novi Sad)
19	FW	BIH	Nemanja Bilbija (to (Bosnia and Herzegovina) FK Sarajevo, previously on loan at (Bosnia and Herzegovina) Borac Banja Luka)
—	DF	SRB	Stefan Jorgić (to Sloga Temerin)
—	FW	MNE	Šaleta Kordić (to (Montenegro) OFK Grbalj, after loan return from RFK Novi Sad)
13	MF	SRB	Vuk Mitošević (to Jagodina)
—	DF	SRB	Vladimir Branković (to (Bosnia and Herzegovina) NK Vitez)
—	GK	SRB	Miloš Čavić (to RFK Novi Sad)
—	FW	SRB	Edin Ferati (to Sloga Temerin)
—	MF	SRB	Slaven Baškalo (was on loan, now signed for Dunav Stari Banovci)
—	FW	SRB	Strahinja Marković (to RFK Novi Sad)
—	MF	MNE	Nemanja Sekulić (released)

=== Jagodina ===
In: Note: Flags indicate national team as defined under FIFA eligibility rules; some limited exceptions apply. Players may hold more than one non-FIFA nationality.

No.	Pos.	Nation	Player
5	DF	SRB	Vukašin Tomić (loan return from (Kazakhstan) Taraz)
44	GK	SRB	Anđelko Đuričić (from Borac Čačak)
14	FW	SRB	Đorđe Šušnjar (from Vojvodina)
11	FW	MNE	Jovan Vučinić (from Čukarički)
8	MF	MKD	Predrag Ranđelović (from (North Macedonia) Vardar)
45	FW	SRB	Aleksandar Pešić (from (Moldova) Sheriff)
89	FW	SRB	Kosta Bajić (from Jedinstvo Putevi)
29	MF	SRB	Vuk Mitošević (from Vojvodina)
18	FW	SRB	Marko Mrkić (from Radnički Niš youth squad)

Out: Note: Flags indicate national team as defined under FIFA eligibility rules; some limited exceptions apply. Players may hold more than one non-FIFA nationality.

No.	Pos.	Nation	Player
18	FW	SRB	Miloš Stojanović (to (China) Wuhan Zall)
24	FW	SRB	Dejan Đenić (to (Lithuania) FK Ekranas)
11	GK	SRB	Igor Bondžulić (to (South Africa) Moroka Swallows)
30	MF	BRA	Marcio Teruel (to (Malta) Vittoriosa Stars)
12	FW	SRB	Sead Hadžibulić (to Radnički Niš, previously brought from (Singapore) Tampines Rovers)
3	MF	GHA	Francis Bossman (to Sloga PM)
—	FW	SRB	Vladimir Milenković (to Radnički Niš, was on loan at Timok)
20	MF	SRB	Saša Nikodijević (to Jedinstvo Putevi)
8	MF	SRB	Miroljub Kostić (on loan to Radnik Surdulica)
—	FW	SLE	Lamin Suma (to (Estonia) Flora Tallinn, was on loan at (Montenegro) Jedinstvo Bijelo Polje)
—	MF	SRB	Miloš Trifunović (on loan to Jedinstvo Paraćin, was on loan at Trgovački Jagodina)
—	GK	SRB	Stevica Zdravković (on loan to Tabane Trgovački)
—	DF	SRB	Stefan Rudić (on loan to Tabane Trgovački, was on loan at Palić)
—	DF	SRB	Andrija Mitić (on loan to Tabane Trgovački)
—	DF	SRB	Bojan Ciger (on loan to Tabane Trgovački)
—	DF	SRB	Nemanja Zdravković (on loan to Tabane Trgovački, was on loan at Kopaonik Brus)
—	MF	SRB	Ivan Miladinović (on loan to Tabane Trgovački)
—	MF	SRB	Stefan Đurić (on loan to Tabane Trgovački)
—	FW	SRB	Nemanja Stanojević (on loan to Tabane Trgovački)

=== Sloboda Užice ===
In: Note: Flags indicate national team as defined under FIFA eligibility rules; some limited exceptions apply. Players may hold more than one non-FIFA nationality.

No.	Pos.	Nation	Player
23	DF	SRB	Bogdan Miličić (from Borac Čačak)
17	FW	JPN	Keisuke Ogawa (from (Latvia) FC Jūrmala)
14	MF	JPN	Shohei Okuno (from (Latvia) FK Auda)
13	MF	SRB	Dino Dolmagić (from FK Zemun)
16	MF	SRB	Miloš Žeravica (from Napredak Kruševac)
11	MF	SRB	Dejan Babić (on loan from Partizan)
9	FW	AZE	Murad Hüseynov (from (Azerbaijan) Sumgayit)

Out: Note: Flags indicate national team as defined under FIFA eligibility rules; some limited exceptions apply. Players may hold more than one non-FIFA nationality.

No.	Pos.	Nation	Player
7	MF	CMR	Didier Tayou (to (Malta) Mqabba F.C.)
23	FW	NGR	Daniel Olerum (to (Jordan) Al-Wehdat)
9	FW	SRB	Predrag Ranđelović (to Kolubara)
14	MF	SRB	Miloš Janićijević (to Sloga Kraljevo)
44	DF	SRB	Mladen Lazarević (to Radnički Niš)
10	MF	TJK	Nuriddin Davronov (to (Tajikistan) Istiqlol Dushanbe)
21	MF	GUI	Kalla Toure (released)
11	FW	SRB	Marko Memedović (to Metalac GM)
9	FW	SRB	Miloš Živanović (to Jedinstvo Putevi, previously brought from BSK Borča)
55	DF	BIH	Delimir Bajić (released)
—	DF	SRB	Marko Jovanović (to OFK Mladenovac)

=== OFK Beograd ===
In: Note: Flags indicate national team as defined under FIFA eligibility rules; some limited exceptions apply. Players may hold more than one non-FIFA nationality.

No.	Pos.	Nation	Player
4	DF	SRB	Bogdan Planić (from Jedinstvo Putevi)
1	GK	SRB	Bojan Pavlović (from (Israel) Hapoel Ashkelon)
—	DF	BIH	Borisav Cicović (loan return from Bačka Topola)
24	FW	SRB	Marko Radivojević (from Trstenik PPT)
23	MF	MKD	Darko Micevski (from (North Macedonia) Teteks)
17	FW	SRB	Jovan Damjanović (from (Belarus) Dinamo Minsk)
10	MF	SRB	Marko Perović (from (Iran) Persepolis)
29	DF	SRB	Stevan Bates (from (Iran) Mes Kerman)
31	FW	SRB	Stefan Kovačević (from Sloboda Čačak)
—	DF	SRB	Zdravko Kovačević (from Radnički N. Pazova)
21	MF	SRB	Ilija Tutnjević (loan return from Bačka Topola)
45	GK	MNE	Vladan Giljen (from (Portugal) Nacional)

Out: Note: Flags indicate national team as defined under FIFA eligibility rules; some limited exceptions apply. Players may hold more than one non-FIFA nationality.

No.	Pos.	Nation	Player
18	MF	MNE	Petar Grbić (loan return to (Greece) Olympiacos)
9	FW	SRB	Nemanja Milić (to Hajduk Kula)
1	GK	SRB	Milan Lukač (to FK Partizan)
24	MF	SRB	Miloš Mijić (to (Slovenia) Domžale)
20	MF	MNE	Nemanja Nikolić (to (Belarus) Dinamo Minsk)
8	MF	SRB	Veseljko Trivunović (to Spartak Subotica)
—	MF	SRB	Uroš Nenadović (to Hajduk Kula)
—	MF	SRB	Miloš Brujić (on loan to Sinđelić Beograd, was on loan at Hajduk Beograd)
—	MF	SRB	Goran Brkić (to Metalac G. M., was on loan at Jedinstvo Putevi)
14	FW	ECU	Augusto Batioja (to (Montenegro) Mladost Podgorica)
—	GK	MNE	Andrija Dragojević (loan extension to (Montenegro) Lovćen)
4	DF	SRB	Danijel Gašić (to (Greece) AEL Kalloni)
3	MF	SRB	Edin Rustemović (on loan to Sinđelić Beograd)
—	MF	BIH	Nikola Danilović (to Sinđelić Beograd)
—	MF	SRB	Igor Stanojević (to (Iceland) Grindavík, previously on loan at PKB Padinska Skela)
10	MF	SRB	Marko Pavlovski (on loan to (Portugal) FC Porto)
—	DF	MNE	Stevan Marković (to Sinđelić Beograd, was on loan at (Montenegro) Mornar Bar)
16	FW	SRB	Ivica Jovanović (to Radnički Niš)
19	FW	SRB	Vladimir Tufegdžić (to Voždovac)
—	FW	MKD	Saško Dukov (to (North Macedonia) Pelister)
18	MF	SRB	Predrag Pavlović (retired)
—	DF	MNE	Mirko Muštur (loan extension to Bežanija)
—	DF	SRB	Dušan Stanković (on loan to Timok)

=== Rad ===
In: Note: Flags indicate national team as defined under FIFA eligibility rules; some limited exceptions apply. Players may hold more than one non-FIFA nationality.

No.	Pos.	Nation	Player
22	MF	SRB	Uglješa Radinović (from Bežanija)
15	MF	SRB	Ivan Rogač (loan return from BSK Borča)
27	MF	SRB	Stefan Tripković (loan return from Banat Zrenjanin)
30	DF	SRB	Vladimir Rodić (loan return from Srem Jakovo)
16	DF	SRB	Miroljub Pešić (was on loan, now signed from Železnik)
34	MF	BRA	Tom (free, last with (Bulgaria) Slavia Sofia)
32	MF	MNE	Uroš Delić (from (Belgium) Beerschot AC)
33	FW	NGR	Patrick Friday Eze (from (Ivory Coast) Africa Sports)
88	GK	SRB	Branislav Danilović (loan return from BSK Borča)

Out: Note: Flags indicate national team as defined under FIFA eligibility rules; some limited exceptions apply. Players may hold more than one non-FIFA nationality.

No.	Pos.	Nation	Player
—	DF	SRB	Dušan Plavšić (on loan to Dolina, was on loan at OFK Mladenovac)
30	DF	SRB	Nikola Leković (to Vojvodina)
23	MF	SRB	Slavko Perović (on loan to (Turkey) Manisaspor)
—	MF	SRB	Dario Božičić (to Bežanija, was on loan at BSK Borča)
—	FW	SRB	Nemanja Obradović (to Voždovac)
—	MF	SRB	Andrej Mrkela (to Spartak Subotica, was on loan at (Turkey) Eskişehirspor)
—	GK	SRB	Miloš Dikić (on loan to Mladenovac, was on loan at Kovačevac)
—	FW	SRB	Nenad Perović (to (Slovenia) Triglav Kranj)
—	GK	BIH	Darko Dejanović (on loan to Srem Jakovo)
—	DF	SRB	Nikola Todorić (on loan to Srem Jakovo)
—	MF	SRB	Dušan Pantelić (on loan to Srem Jakovo, was on loan at OFK Mladenovac)
—	MF	SRB	Uroš Tomović (on loan to Srem Jakovo)
—	FW	SRB	Nikola Ivković (on loan to Srem Jakovo)
—	MF	FRA	David Milinković (was on loan, now sold to BASK)

=== Spartak Subotica ===
In: Note: Flags indicate national team as defined under FIFA eligibility rules; some limited exceptions apply. Players may hold more than one non-FIFA nationality.

No.	Pos.	Nation	Player
1	GK	SRB	Milan Jovanić (from (Poland) Wisła Kraków)
25	GK	SRB	Budimir Janošević (from Teleoptik)
10	MF	SRB	Veseljko Trivunović (from OFK Beograd)
5	DF	MNE	Stefan Cicmil (from Radnički Niš)
22	DF	MNE	Marko Vidović (from (Hungary) Egri FC)
24	DF	MNE	Ilija Radović (from (Montenegro) Čelik Nikšić)
9	FW	SRB	Miloš Džugurdić (from Teleoptik)
6	DF	SRB	Vladimir Kovačević (from Vojvodina)
15	DF	SRB	Stefan Milošević (from Partizan youth team)
16	FW	SRB	Nemanja Milić (from Hajduk Kula)
26	MF	SRB	Marko Jondić (loan return from FK Palić)
27	DF	SRB	Branimir Jočić (loan return from FK Palić)
27	MF	SRB	Andrej Mrkela (from Rad)
3	MF	SRB	Nemanja Marković (loan return from FK Palić)

Out: Note: Flags indicate national team as defined under FIFA eligibility rules; some limited exceptions apply. Players may hold more than one non-FIFA nationality.

No.	Pos.	Nation	Player
9	FW	SRB	Nemanja Čović (to Donji Srem)
1	GK	BIH	Nikola Stijaković (to (Bosnia and Herzegovina) Zvijezda Gradačac)
4	MF	SRB	Aleksandar Kovačević (to Red Star Belgrade)
10	FW	SRB	Đorđe Despotović (to (Belgium) Lokeren)
24	DF	SRB	Goran Adamović (to (Slovakia) MFK Ružomberok)
6	DF	SRB	Vidak Bratić (retired)
5	DF	CMR	Noé Archille Kwin (to (Slovakia) DAC Dunajská Streda)
—	FW	SRB	Marko Matijašević (to (Greece) Paniliakos, after loan return from Palić)
—	GK	BIH	Slaviša Bogdanović (to Dorćol)
3	DF	MNE	Slavko Damjanović (to Bačka 1901)

=== Javor Ivanjica ===
In: Note: Flags indicate national team as defined under FIFA eligibility rules; some limited exceptions apply. Players may hold more than one non-FIFA nationality.

No.	Pos.	Nation	Player
33	MF	SRB	Dušan Ivković (from FK Inđija)
30	DF	MNE	Nemanja Gojačanin (from (Montenegro) Jedinstvo Bijelo Polje)
6	DF	SRB	Čedomir Tomčić (from FK Inđija)
15	FW	UZB	Husniddin Gafurov (from (Uzbekistan) NBU Osiyo)
9	FW	SRB	Stefan Dražić (from Radnički Obrenovac)
5	MF	SRB	Marko Docić (loan return from Srem Jakovo)
32	DF	SRB	Nikola Knežević (from Polet Ljubić)
17	DF	SRB	Nemanja Miletić (from Mačva Šabac)
23	GK	BIH	Darjan Matović (from (Bosnia and Herzegovina) Sutjeska Foča)
—	DF	NGR	Henry Onyilo (from (Nigeria) Chukson F.C.)
4	DF	BIH	Željko Đokić (from (Poland) Ruch Chorzów)
13	FW	SRB	Vuk Sotirović (from (Cyprus) Nea Salamis)
21	DF	SRB	Aleksandar Alempijević (from (Hungary) Ferencváros)
16	FW	SRB	Bojan Čečarić (from Radnički N. P.)

Out: Note: Flags indicate national team as defined under FIFA eligibility rules; some limited exceptions apply. Players may hold more than one non-FIFA nationality.

No.	Pos.	Nation	Player
17	DF	SRB	Marko Momčilović (to (Romania) Pandurii Târgu Jiu)
5	DF	SRB	Branko Ostojić (to (Greece) Veria)
1	GK	SRB	Milorad Nikolić (to (Slovakia) MFK Ružomberok)
6	DF	BIH	Ognjen Petrović (on loan to (Bosnia and Herzegovina) Borac Banja Luka)
11	FW	NGR	Ifeanyi Onyilo (to Red Star)
24	DF	SRB	Radoslav Vlašić (to Metalac GM)
—	GK	SRB	Petar Glintić (on loan to Smederevo, was on loan at Sloga PM)
25	FW	SRB	Živorad Mišić (on loan to Sloga PM)
14	MF	SRB	Aleksandar Keljević (on loan to FK Smederevo)
—	MF	SRB	Stefan Stojanov (to Sinđelić Beograd, was on loan at Jedinstvo St. Pazova)
9	FW	SRB	Filip Kostić (to (Bosnia and Herzegovina) Mladost V.O.)
—	MF	SRB	Mladen Mićanović (on loan to Lokomotiva Beograd after being brought from Mačva Šabac)
—	FW	SRB	Bojan Spasojević (on loan to Kopaonik Brus, was on loan at Šumadija 1903)

=== Donji Srem ===
In: Note: Flags indicate national team as defined under FIFA eligibility rules; some limited exceptions apply. Players may hold more than one non-FIFA nationality.

No.	Pos.	Nation	Player
40	GK	SRB	Mladen Živković (from Smederevo)
7	DF	SRB	Ivan Božović (from Smederevo)
44	DF	MKD	Stefan Aškovski (on loan from Partizan)
—	FW	SRB	Branislav Tošić (loan return from Hajduk Kula)
88	FW	SRB	Filip Stojanović (from Voždovac)
3	MF	SRB	Danilo Kuzmanović (from Vrčin)
5	DF	SRB	Vladimir Milašinović (from OFK Mladenovac)
13	FW	SRB	Petar Ilić (from RFK Novi Sad)
17	MF	BIH	Miljan Govedarica (from (Bosnia and Herzegovina) Slavija)
1	FW	SRB	Nemanja Čović (from Spartak Subotica)
—	GK	SRB	Zdravko Marić (from Brodarac)
15	MF	SRB	Uroš Sinđić (from Voždovac)
4	DF	BIH	Aleksandar Vasiljević (from FK Novi Pazar)

Out: Note: Flags indicate national team as defined under FIFA eligibility rules; some limited exceptions apply. Players may hold more than one non-FIFA nationality.

No.	Pos.	Nation	Player
3	DF	SRB	Miloš Josimov (to (Slovakia) Slovan Bratislava)
12	GK	SRB	Ljubo Kovačević (to Loznica)
11	DF	SRB	Aleksandar Radišić (to Dolina)
7	FW	SRB	Denis Ristov (to Radnički Pirot)
88	MF	SRB	Milan Milutinović (released)
44	FW	SRB	Igor Urošević (to Mladost Lučani)
22	DF	BIH	Borislav Terzić (to (Georgia (country)) Zestafoni)
15	DF	MNE	Milko Novaković (to (Moldova) Dacia Chișinău, previously bought from BSK Borča)
1	MF	SRB	Saša Teofanov (to Zemun)
4	DF	SRB	Đorđe Vukobrat (to (Oman) Al-Nasr)
—	MF	SRB	Ivan Gmidžić (on loan to Srem Jakovo)
16	MF	SRB	Uroš Košutić (on loan to Zemun)
—	DF	SRB	Ivan Šubert (on loan to Zemun, was on loan at Sinđelić Beograd)

=== Radnički Niš ===
In: Note: Flags indicate national team as defined under FIFA eligibility rules; some limited exceptions apply. Players may hold more than one non-FIFA nationality.

No.	Pos.	Nation	Player
9	FW	SRB	Vladimir Milenković (from Jagodina)
23	GK	SRB	Aleksandar Kesić (was on loan, now signed from Vojvodina)
5	DF	SRB	Stefan Marković (loan return from Car Konstantin)
30	DF	SRB	Vladan Pavlović (from Vojvodina)
99	FW	SRB	Milutin Ivanović (from (Switzerland) Yverdon)
77	DF	BIH	Petar Jovanović (from Jedinstvo Putevi)
49	DF	SRB	Branko Pauljević (on loan from Partizan)
4	DF	SRB	Radoš Bulatović (from FK Novi Pazar)
16	MF	SRB	Milan Ćulum (from Hajduk Kula)
11	FW	BIH	Uroš Đerić (free, last with (Finland) VPS)
12	FW	SRB	Sead Hadžibulić (from Jagodina)
1	GK	SRB	Nenad Filipović (from (Bulgaria) Etar 1924)
20	MF	SRB	Aleksandar Trišović (from (Ukraine) Hoverla)
22	FW	SRB	Ivica Jovanović (from OFK Beograd)

Out: Note: Flags indicate national team as defined under FIFA eligibility rules; some limited exceptions apply. Players may hold more than one non-FIFA nationality.

No.	Pos.	Nation	Player
12	MF	SRB	Dušan Ivanov (to BSK Borča)
11	FW	SRB	Petar Škuletić (loan return to Vojvodina)
20	DF	SRB	Predrag Stamenković (Retired)
58	DF	MNE	Stefan Cicmil (to Spartak Subotica)
15	FW	SRB	Milan Jovanović (to (Albania) KF Tirana)
22	FW	SRB	Dalibor Mitrović (to Moravac Orion)
11	MF	SRB	Nikola Lukić (to Metalac G. M.)
—	DF	SRB	Mladen Lazarević (on loan to Novi Pazar, previously brought from Sloboda Užice)
—	DF	SRB	Bojan Đorđević (on loan to Novi Pazar)
—	MF	SRB	Milan Svojić (to (North Macedonia) Horizont Turnovo, after being brought from Radnički 1923)
—	MF	SRB	Aleksandar Stanković (on loan to Car Konstantin, was on loan at Sinđelić Niš)
18	MF	SRB	Ivan Milenković (to Sinđelić Niš)
19	DF	SRB	Mladen Mitrović (on loan to Timočanin)
20	MF	SRB	Mladen Petrović (on loan to Radnički Pirot)
—	MF	SRB	Miloš Nikolić (on loan to Sinđelić Niš, was on loan at Žitorađa)

=== Radnički 1923 ===
In: Note: Flags indicate national team as defined under FIFA eligibility rules; some limited exceptions apply. Players may hold more than one non-FIFA nationality.

No.	Pos.	Nation	Player
20	MF	SRB	Stefan Petrović (loan return from Pobeda Beloševac)
—	FW	SRB	Lazar Popović (loan return from Pobeda Beloševac)
11	MF	SRB	Aleksandar Stoimirović (from (Hungary) Pécsi MFC)
1	GK	CRO	Marko Šimić (from (Iran) Sanat Naft)
21	MF	ARG	Matías Porcari (from (Uruguay) Progreso)
77	MF	SRB	Filip Knežević (on loan from Partizan)
89	FW	SRB	Lazar Marjanović (from (Bosnia and Herzegovina) Zrinjski)
99	FW	SRB	Bojan Malinić (from (Albania) Besa Kavajë)
88	MF	SRB	Radovan Krivokapić (from (Cyprus) Enosis Neon Paralimni)

Out: Note: Flags indicate national team as defined under FIFA eligibility rules; some limited exceptions apply. Players may hold more than one non-FIFA nationality.

No.	Pos.	Nation	Player
21	MF	SRB	Petar Đuričković (loan return to Red Star Belgrade)
23	MF	SRB	Marko Mirić (loan return to Red Star Belgrade)
1	GK	SRB	Marko Knežević (to Voždovac)
8	MF	SRB	Milan Svojić (to Radnički Niš)
10	FW	SRB	Stanimir Milošković (to (Greece) GAS Aiginiakos)
16	FW	SRB	Bojan Zoranović (to Metalac G. M.)
17	MF	SRB	Aleksandar Varjačić (to Radnik Surdulica)

=== Novi Pazar ===
In: Note: Flags indicate national team as defined under FIFA eligibility rules; some limited exceptions apply. Players may hold more than one non-FIFA nationality.

No.	Pos.	Nation	Player
3	DF	SRB	Radoš Protić (from (Ukraine) PFC Oleksandria)
2	DF	SRB	Bojan Đorđević (on loan from Radnički Niš)
13	DF	SRB	Elvedin Škrijelj (free, last with Mladost Lučani)
19	GK	SRB	Nemanja Latinović (from Hajduk Kula)
26	DF	SRB	Slobodan Vuković (from Hajduk Kula)
8	MF	SRB	Ivan Obrovac (from Hajduk Kula)
20	MF	SRB	Dejan Rusmir (from Hajduk Kula)
10	FW	BIH	Petar Jelić (from Hajduk Kula)
71	DF	SRB	Miloš Obradović (from Hajduk Kula)
30	MF	SRB	Marko Jevtović (from Hajduk Kula)
77	DF	SRB	Mladen Lazarević (on loan from Radnički Niš)
70	FW	SRB	Uroš Nenadović (from Hajduk Kula)
99	MF	SRB	Nemanja Arsenijević (from (Israel) Hapoel Acre)
87	GK	BIH	Nemanja Supić (from Vojvodina)
7	MF	MDA	Vitalie Bulat (from (Moldova) FC Tiraspol)

Out: Note: Flags indicate national team as defined under FIFA eligibility rules; some limited exceptions apply. Players may hold more than one non-FIFA nationality.

No.	Pos.	Nation	Player
33	DF	SRB	Ljubo Nenadić (loan return to Red Star Belgrade)
25	DF	MNE	Dejan Boljević (to Čukarički)
24	GK	SRB	Vladan Đogatović (to Metalac G.M.)
44	DF	SRB	Radoš Bulatović (to Radnički Niš)
9	FW	SRB	Miloš Bogunović (to (Thailand) Bangkok United)
8	MF	BIH	Amar Rahmanović (to (Bosnia and Herzegovina) Olimpic Sarajevo)
3	DF	BIH	Aleksandar Vasiljević (to Donji Srem)
55	DF	SRB	Marko Milić (released)
32	DF	BIH	Borislav Topić (released)
12	DF	SRB	Zoran Pešić (to Radnik Surdulica)
15	MF	SRB	Branislav Stanić (released)
64	FW	SRB	Zoran Vujović (to (North Macedonia) Metalurg Skopje)
22	GK	SRB	Marko Janković (released)

=== Napredak Kruševac ===
In: Note: Flags indicate national team as defined under FIFA eligibility rules; some limited exceptions apply. Players may hold more than one non-FIFA nationality.

No.	Pos.	Nation	Player
17	FW	SRB	Miloš Deletić (from Vojvodina)
21	DF	SRB	Ivan Kostić (loan return from Timok)
30	FW	SRB	Srđan Dimitrov (from FK Inđija)
3	DF	SRB	Mladen Veselinović (from Hajduk Kula)
18	DF	SRB	Miloš Cvetković (from Hajduk Kula)
70	GK	SRB	Marko Lazarević (from Teleoptik)
14	FW	SRB	Nikola Trujić (was on loan, now signed from Partizan)
97	GK	SRB	Stefan Stojanović (from Sloga Leskovac to youth squad)

Out: Note: Flags indicate national team as defined under FIFA eligibility rules; some limited exceptions apply. Players may hold more than one non-FIFA nationality.

No.	Pos.	Nation	Player
32	DF	SRB	Igor Petrović (to Mladost Lučani)
7	MF	SRB	Miloš Žeravica (to Sloboda Užice)
24	DF	SRB	Marko Bošković (to Mladost Lučani)
11	MF	SRB	Stevan Živković (on loan to Bežanija)
—	FW	SRB	Srđan Ristić (to Radnik Surdulica, was on loan at Trstenik PTT)
5	DF	SRB	Darko Dunjić (released)
—	DF	SRB	Nemanja Zdravković (to Jagodina, was on loan at Kopaonik Brus)
—	FW	SRB	Aleksa Božović (on loan to Kolubara Lazarevac, was on loan at Bežanija)
8	FW	SRB	Nikola Popović (on loan to Kolubara Lazarevac)
17	DF	SRB	Miloš Paris (on loan to Kopaonik Brus)
—	FW	SRB	Danijel Smiljković (to Trstenik PPT)
—	FW	SRB	Nemanja Arsić (on loan to Trstenik PPT)
—	FW	SRB	Anđelko Adamac (on loan to Trstenik PPT)

=== Čukarički ===
In: Note: Flags indicate national team as defined under FIFA eligibility rules; some limited exceptions apply. Players may hold more than one non-FIFA nationality.

No.	Pos.	Nation	Player
14	MF	SRB	Slavoljub Srnić (was on loan, now signed from Red Star Belgrade)
6	MF	SRB	Dragoljub Srnić (was on loan, now signed from Red Star Belgrade)
7	FW	MNE	Radislav Sekulić (from Bežanija)
25	DF	MNE	Dejan Boljević (from FK Novi Pazar)
31	DF	SRB	Rajko Brežančić (from Bežanija)
23	DF	SRB	Bojan Ostojić (from Voždovac)
8	MF	SRB	Ivan Todorović (from (Russia) Rotor)
4	DF	BRA	Lucas Piasentin (from (Portugal) União Madeira)
30	FW	CHI	Sebastián Guerrero (from (Chile) Santiago Morning)
34	FW	SRB	Staniša Mandić (from FK Rad youth squad)
27	MF	SRB	Đorđe Radovanović (from (Portugal) União da Madeira)

Out: Note: Flags indicate national team as defined under FIFA eligibility rules; some limited exceptions apply. Players may hold more than one non-FIFA nationality.

No.	Pos.	Nation	Player
3	DF	SRB	Ivan Popović (released)
11	DF	SRB	Aleksandar Trninić (to (Hungary) Debreceni VSC)
16	FW	MNE	Jovan Vučinić (to Jagodina)
—	DF	SRB	Borislav Simić (on loan to Sinđelić Beograd)
—	MF	SRB	Branko Mihajlović (on loan to Sinđelić Beograd)
29	GK	BIH	Čedomir Radić (on loan to BASK, previously brought from OFK Mladenovac)
—	DF	SRB	Miloš Pitulić (on loan to BASK)
—	DF	SRB	Milenko Malović (on loan to BASK)
—	MF	SRB	Đorđe Isaković (on loan to BASK, was on loan at Seljak Mihajlovac)
—	MF	SRB	Andreja Lazović (on loan to BASK)
—	MF	SRB	Petar Novović (on loan to BASK)
—	DF	SRB	Marko Lukić (to Lokomotiva Beograd)
—	MF	SRB	Nemanja Krstić (to Šumadija Jagnjilo)
—	GK	SRB	Andreja Petrović (to Žarkovo)
—	FW	SRB	David Arbutina (to Žarkovo)

=== Voždovac ===
In: Note: Flags indicate national team as defined under FIFA eligibility rules; some limited exceptions apply. Players may hold more than one non-FIFA nationality.

No.	Pos.	Nation	Player
1	GK	SRB	Nikola Perić (from Hajduk Kula)
6	DF	SRB	Slobodan Lalić (from Hajduk Kula)
24	MF	SRB	Danilo Sekulić (from Hajduk Kula)
21	MF	SRB	Saša Kiš (from Hajduk Kula)
7	MF	SRB	Nikola Lekić (from Proleter Novi Sad)
12	GK	SRB	Marko Knežević (from Radnički 1923)
3	DF	SRB	Nikola Vasiljević (from (Bosnia and Herzegovina) Borac Banja Luka)
4	DF	SRB	Slavko Ćulibrk (from (North Macedonia) Rabotnički)
5	MF	SRB	Marko Nikolić (from (Sweden) Valsta Syrianska)
11	DF	SRB	Stefan Đorđević (from Banat Zrenjanin)
14	FW	SRB	Nemanja Obradović (from Rad)
16	DF	BIH	Goran Dragović (from (North Macedonia) Metalurg Skopje)
18	MF	SRB	Dejan Janković (from (Bosnia and Herzegovina) Leotar)
23	MF	SRB	Dušan Mićić (from Proleter Novi Sad)
9	FW	SRB	Ognjen Ožegović (on loan from Red Star Belgrade)
95	MF	SRB	Nikola Karaklajić (on loan from Red Star Belgrade)
2	MF	ROU	Cristian Muscalu (from (Romania) Ceahlăul)
25	MF	SRB	Dejan Milovanović (free, last with (France) RC Lens)
8	MF	SRB	Stefan Babović (from (Spain) Real Zaragoza)
20	FW	SRB	Rade Veljović (from FK Smederevo)

Out: Note: Flags indicate national team as defined under FIFA eligibility rules; some limited exceptions apply. Players may hold more than one non-FIFA nationality.

No.	Pos.	Nation	Player
—	DF	SRB	Dejan Karan (loan return to Vojvodina)
—	GK	SRB	Zoran Popović (to Vojvodina)
—	FW	SRB	Filip Stojanović (to Donji Srem)
—	DF	SRB	Bojan Ostojić (to Čukarički)
—	DF	BIH	Nermin Haskić (to (Slovakia) MFK Košice)
—	MF	SRB	Nebojša Prtenjak (to (Montenegro) Čelik Nikšić)
—	MF	SRB	Uroš Sinđić (to Donji Srem)
—	FW	SRB	Vladimir Trifunović (on loan to FK Smederevo)
—	MF	SRB	Zoran Milovac (to BSK Borča)
—	MF	SRB	Srđan Novković (to BSK Borča)
—	FW	SRB	Vladimir Tufegdžić (on loan to Sloga (PM), previously brought from OFK Beograd)
8	MF	SRB	Miloš Filipović (to BSK Borča, previously brought from FK Timok)
20	MF	SRB	Saša Dobrić (to BSK Borča, previously brought from (Hungary) Egri FC)
—	DF	MNE	Stefan Dabetić (to IM Rakovica)
—	MF	SRB	Miljan Ilić (on loan to IM Rakovica)
—	GK	SRB	Filip Erić (on loan to Šumadija Jagnjilo)
—	GK	SRB	Zoran Cvitkovac (to BASK)
—	FW	SRB	Nebojša Bastajić (to Srem Jakovo)

== See also ==
- Serbian SuperLiga
- 2013–14 Serbian SuperLiga

== External sources ==
- Sportske.net information agency.
- SuperLiga news at Sportski žurnal website.
- Sportal.rs information agency.
- Srpskifudbal.rs football website. Transfers page
- Superliga.rs
