= List of Serbian football transfers winter 2013–14 =

- This is a list of transfers in Serbian football for the 2013-14 winter transfer window.
- Only moves featuring a Serbian SuperLiga side are listed.
- The order by which the clubs are listed is equal to the classification at the mid-season of the 2013–14 Serbian SuperLiga.

== Serbian SuperLiga ==
=== Partizan ===
In: Note: Flags indicate national team as defined under FIFA eligibility rules; some limited exceptions apply. Players may hold more than one non-FIFA nationality.

| No. | Pos. | Nation | Player |
|---|---|---|---|
| 20 | MF | MNE | Nikola Drinčić (free, last with (Russia) Krasnodar) |
| 4 | DF | SRB | Miroslav Vulićević (from Vojvodina) |
| 32 | FW | SRB | Petar Škuletić (from Vojvodina) |
| 15 | DF | SRB | Branislav Trajković (from Vojvodina) |
| 27 | FW | SRB | Danko Lazović (free, last with (Russia) Zenit St. Petersburg) |

Out: Note: Flags indicate national team as defined under FIFA eligibility rules; some limited exceptions apply. Players may hold more than one non-FIFA nationality.

| No. | Pos. | Nation | Player |
|---|---|---|---|
| 99 | MF | CMR | Eric Djemba-Djemba (to (Scotland) St Mirren) |
| 44 | DF | MKD | Stefan Aškovski (on loan to Napredak, was on loan at Donji Srem) |
| 2 | DF | SRB | Marko Živković (to Vojvodina) |
| 88 | GK | SRB | Vladimir Stojković (to (Greece) Ergotelis) |
| — | MF | SRB | Dejan Babić (on loan to Rad, was on loan at Sloboda Užice) |
| 39 | MF | SRB | Miloš Jojić (to (Germany) Borussia Dortmund) |
| — | GK | SRB | Filip Kljajić (on loan to Teleoptik, previously brought from Rad) |
| 18 | DF | SRB | Saša Ivković (on loan to Teleoptik) |

=== Red Star Belgrade ===
In: Note: Flags indicate national team as defined under FIFA eligibility rules; some limited exceptions apply. Players may hold more than one non-FIFA nationality.

| No. | Pos. | Nation | Player |
|---|---|---|---|
| 14 | DF | MNE | Savo Pavićević (from (Cyprus) Anorthosis) |
| 44 | DF | SLO | Dejan Kelhar (from (Azerbaijan) Gabala) |
| 36 | DF | SRB | Saša Cilinšek (free, last with (France) Évian) |

Out: Note: Flags indicate national team as defined under FIFA eligibility rules; some limited exceptions apply. Players may hold more than one non-FIFA nationality.

| No. | Pos. | Nation | Player |
|---|---|---|---|
| 25 | DF | SRB | Filip Mladenović (to (Belarus) BATE Borisov) |
| 21 | MF | SRB | Marko Mirić (to (Belarus) Minsk) |
| 29 | DF | MNE | Marko Vešović (to (Italy) Torino) |
| 14 | FW | SRB | Nikola Đorđević (on loan to Sloga PM) |
| 23 | MF | SRB | Petar Đuričković (on loan to Radnički Niš) |
| 32 | GK | SRB | Aleksandar Kirovski (released, was on loan at Zemun) |
| 34 | DF | SRB | Stevan Luković (to Napredak Kruševac) |
| 18 | FW | SRB | Ognjen Ožegović (to Rad, was on loan at Voždovac) |
| 30 | DF | LBR | Omega Roberts (on loan to (Montenegro) Mladost Podgorica) |
| 15 | MF | SRB | Nemanja Ahčin (on loan to (Montenegro) Grbalj) |
| — | MF | SRB | Stefan Čikić (on loan to BSK Borča) |
| 45 | MF | SRB | Milan Jokić (on loan to BSK Borča) |
| 27 | FW | SRB | Stefan Mihajlović (on loan to Sloboda Užice) |
| 31 | GK | SRB | Marko Trkulja (on loan to Spartak Subotica) |
| 4 | DF | SRB | Darko Lazić (on loan to Spartak Subotica) |
| 40 | DF | SRB | Branko Jovanović (to OFK Beograd) |
| — | FW | BIH | Vanja Zekić (to (Bosnia and Herzegovina) Mladost V. O.) |

=== Jagodina ===
In: Note: Flags indicate national team as defined under FIFA eligibility rules; some limited exceptions apply. Players may hold more than one non-FIFA nationality.

| No. | Pos. | Nation | Player |
|---|---|---|---|
| 3 | DF | SRB | Ivan Miladinović (loan return from Trgovački Jagodina) |
| 8 | MF | SRB | Dušan Martinović (from Borac Čačak) |
| 1 | GK | SRB | Nikola Perić (from Voždovac) |
| 17 | FW | SRB | Nikola Mojsilović (from IM Rakovica) |
| 50 | MF | MKD | Nikola Jakimovski (from (Japan) Nagoya Grampus) |
| 20 | DF | SRB | Slađan Mijatović (from Železnik) |
| 4 | DF | CRO | Dajan Šimac (from (Turkey) Denizlispor) |
| 95 | FW | SRB | Dean Tišma (from Red Star Belgrade youth team) |

Out: Note: Flags indicate national team as defined under FIFA eligibility rules; some limited exceptions apply. Players may hold more than one non-FIFA nationality.

| No. | Pos. | Nation | Player |
|---|---|---|---|
| 9 | FW | SRB | Slaviša Stojanović (to Borac Čačak) |
| 8 | MF | MKD | Predrag Ranđelović (to (Belarus) Minsk) |
| 17 | MF | MKD | Dragan Stojkov (released) |
| — | MF | SRB | Miroljub Kostić (to (Slovenia) Olimpija Ljubljana, was on loan at Radnik Surdulica) |
| 32 | DF | LBA | Mohamed El Monir (to (Libya) Al-Ittihad Tripoli) |
| 15 | DF | SRB | Josip Projić (to Voždovac) |
| 27 | DF | SRB | Duško Dukić (to Voždovac) |
| 89 | FW | SRB | Kosta Bajić (to (Montenegro) Rudar Pljevlja) |
| 5 | DF | SRB | Vukašin Tomić (to (Romania) Universitatea Craiova) |
| 11 | FW | MNE | Jovan Vučinić (to (Montenegro) Mornar Bar) |

=== Radnički Niš ===
In: Note: Flags indicate national team as defined under FIFA eligibility rules; some limited exceptions apply. Players may hold more than one non-FIFA nationality.

| No. | Pos. | Nation | Player |
|---|---|---|---|
| 22 | DF | BIH | Aleksandar Kosorić (from (Iraq) Erbil SC) |
| 11 | FW | SRB | Ivan Pejčić (free, last with Radnički 1923) |
| 19 | MF | SRB | Saša Marjanović (free, last with (Moldova) Sheriff) |
| 25 | FW | SLO | Dragan Jelić (from (Austria) Kapfenberger SV) |
| 18 | MF | SRB | Petar Đuričković (on loan from Red Star Belgrade) |
| 99 | FW | BRA | Caio (from (Brazil) São Bernardo) |
| 27 | MF | SRB | Miloš Krstić (on loan from (Switzerland) Thun) |
| 29 | DF | SEN | Ibrahima Gueye (from (Belgium) Lokeren) |

Out: Note: Flags indicate national team as defined under FIFA eligibility rules; some limited exceptions apply. Players may hold more than one non-FIFA nationality.

| No. | Pos. | Nation | Player |
|---|---|---|---|
| 22 | FW | SRB | Ivica Jovanović (loan return to OFK Beograd) |
| 48 | MF | SRB | Marko Ljubinković (released) |
| 3 | DF | SRB | Aleksandar Simov (to Metalac GM) |
| 88 | MF | SRB | Vladan Binić (to (Bosnia and Herzegovina) Leotar) |
| — | DF | SRB | Mladen Mitrović (on loan to Sinđelić Niš, was on loan at Timočanin Knjaževac) |
| — | MF | SRB | Aleksandar Stanković (on loan to Sinđelić Niš, was on loan at Car Konstantin) |
| 36 | GK | SRB | Miodrag Filipović (on loan to Radnički Pirot) |
| — | MF | SRB | Mladen Petrović (loan extension to Radnički Pirot) |
| — | MF | SRB | Miloš Nikolić (on loan to Radnički Pirot, was on loan at Sinđelić Niš) |
| 99 | FW | SRB | Milutin Ivanović (released) |
| 11 | FW | BIH | Uroš Đerić (to Borac Čačak) |
| 6 | DF | SRB | Miloš Živković (to (Romania) Botoșani) |
| — | FW | SRB | Marko Zdravković (on loan to Balkanski, previously brought from (Albania) Himara) |

=== Vojvodina ===
In: Note: Flags indicate national team as defined under FIFA eligibility rules; some limited exceptions apply. Players may hold more than one non-FIFA nationality.

| No. | Pos. | Nation | Player |
|---|---|---|---|
| 16 | FW | SRB | Milan Spremo (loan return from Sloga PM) |
| 4 | MF | SRB | Mirko Ivanić (loan return from Proleter Novi Sad) |
| 26 | MF | BIH | Nikola Popara (from Spartak Subotica) |
| 6 | DF | SRB | Nino Pekarić (from Novi Pazar) |
| 22 | FW | SRB | Jovan Stojanović (from Radnički Obrenovac) |
| 14 | FW | SRB | Uroš Nenadović (from Novi Pazar) |
| 9 | FW | SRB | Lazar Veselinović (from Hajduk Kula) |
| 5 | DF | MNE | Milko Novaković (from (Moldova) Dacia Chișinău) |
| 12 | GK | SRB | Milan Jovanić (from Spartak Subotica) |
| 19 | DF | SRB | Stefan Nikolić (from (Montenegro) Mladost Podgorica) |
| 17 | DF | SRB | Marko Živković (from Partizan) |
| 8 | MF | SRB | Darko Puškarić (from Spartak Subotica) |

Out: Note: Flags indicate national team as defined under FIFA eligibility rules; some limited exceptions apply. Players may hold more than one non-FIFA nationality.

| No. | Pos. | Nation | Player |
|---|---|---|---|
| 30 | GK | SRB | Zoran Popović (to Voždovac) |
| 13 | DF | MNE | Ivan Fatić (to (Montenegro) Rudar Pljevlja) |
| 16 | DF | CRO | Mario Barić (to (Bosnia and Herzegovina) Sarajevo) |
| — | DF | SRB | Đorđe Jokić (released) |
| 12 | GK | CRO | Matej Delač (loan return to (England) Chelsea) |
| 22 | DF | SRB | Miroslav Vulićević (to Partizan) |
| 19 | DF | SRB | Jagoš Vuković (to (Turkey) Konyaspor) |
| 17 | FW | MNE | Stefan Denković (to (Hungary) Puskás Akadémia) |
| — | MF | NED | Serginho Greene (to (Cyprus) AEK Larnaca) |
| 99 | FW | SRB | Andrija Kaluđerović (loan return to (China) Beijing Guoan) |
| 9 | FW | SRB | Petar Škuletić (to Partizan) |
| 6 | DF | SRB | Branislav Trajković (to Partizan) |
| 33 | FW | MNE | Simon Vukčević (to (Greece) Levadiakos) |
| — | DF | SRB | Srđan Bečelić (was on loan, now signed for (Montenegro) Sutjeska Nikšić) |
| 5 | DF | MNE | Igor Vujačić (released) |
| 8 | MF | MNE | Nebojša Kosović (to (Belgium) Standard Liège) |
| 3 | DF | SRB | Nikola Leković (to (Poland) Lechia Gdańsk) |
| — | GK | SRB | Đorđe Petrić (to Proleter Novi Sad) |
| — | MF | SRB | Milan Makarić (on loan to Proleter Novi Sad) |
| 20 | MF | MNE | Janko Tumbasević (on loan to Spartak Subotica) |
| 10 | MF | BIH | Stojan Vranješ (to (Poland) Lechia Gdańsk) |

=== Novi Pazar ===
In: Note: Flags indicate national team as defined under FIFA eligibility rules; some limited exceptions apply. Players may hold more than one non-FIFA nationality.

| No. | Pos. | Nation | Player |
|---|---|---|---|
| 4 | DF | SRB | Vladimir Otašević (from Radnički 1923) |
| 7 | DF | SRB | Siniša Stevanović (from Spartak Subotica) |
| 12 | GK | CRO | Marko Šimić (from Radnički 1923) |
| 28 | MF | SRB | Kenan Ragipović (from (Montenegro) Grbalj) |
| 10 | FW | SRB | Vuk Sotirović (from Javor) |
| 17 | FW | SRB | Nebojša Stanojlović (from Mladost Lučani) |
| — | MF | SRB | Anes Hot (from Tutin) |
| 22 | GK | SRB | Jasmin Koč (from Sloga Sjenica) |
| 44 | DF | SRB | Ersin Mehmedović (from (Kazakhstan) Taraz) |
| 77 | MF | SRB | Predrag Pavlović (out of retirement) |
| 21 | MF | SRB | Lazar Pajović (from Sopot) |

Out: Note: Flags indicate national team as defined under FIFA eligibility rules; some limited exceptions apply. Players may hold more than one non-FIFA nationality.

| No. | Pos. | Nation | Player |
|---|---|---|---|
| 70 | FW | SRB | Uroš Nenadović (to Vojvodina) |
| 33 | DF | SRB | Nino Pekarić (to Vojvodina) |
| 11 | FW | SRB | Nemanja Vidaković (to Napredak Kruševac) |
| 4 | DF | SRB | Emir Lotinac (to (Singapore) Balestier Khalsa) |
| 21 | DF | SRB | Miloš Obradović (to OFK Beograd) |
| 7 | MF | MDA | Vitalie Bulat (to OFK Beograd) |
| 87 | GK | BIH | Nemanja Supić (to Voždovac) |
| 19 | GK | SRB | Nemanja Latinović (to (Romania) Universitatea Craiova) |
| 86 | DF | SRB | Miloš Marković (to (Bosnia and Herzegovina) Borac Banja Luka) |
| 88 | MF | BIH | Haris Redžepi (to (Bosnia and Herzegovina) Sloboda Tuzla) |
| 10 | FW | BIH | Petar Jelić (to (China) Guangdong Sunray Cave) |
| — | MF | SRB | Tarik Čmajčanin (to Sinđelić Niš, was on loan at Jošanica) |
| 18 | MF | SRB | Faruk Bihorac (released) |
| — | MF | SRB | Elmin Marukić (to Jošanica, was on loan at Vujić Voda Valjevo) |
| 17 | MF | SRB | Suad Nokić (to Jošanica) |
| 27 | MF | SRB | Sead Župić (to Jošanica) |

=== Čukarički ===
In: Note: Flags indicate national team as defined under FIFA eligibility rules; some limited exceptions apply. Players may hold more than one non-FIFA nationality.

| No. | Pos. | Nation | Player |
|---|---|---|---|
| 24 | MF | SRB | Petar Bojić (from Napredak) |
| 30 | FW | SRB | Nenad Mirosavljević (from Napredak) |
| 5 | DF | SRB | Slobodan Lalić (from Voždovac) |
| 15 | MF | SRB | Stefan Dimić (from Rad) |
| 11 | FW | SRB | Andrija Pavlović (from Rad) |

Out: Note: Flags indicate national team as defined under FIFA eligibility rules; some limited exceptions apply. Players may hold more than one non-FIFA nationality.

| No. | Pos. | Nation | Player |
|---|---|---|---|
| 5 | DF | SRB | Dejan Stamenković (to Borac Čačak) |
| 21 | FW | SRB | Slobodan Dinčić (to Metalac GM) |
| 33 | MF | SRB | Nikola Krčmarević (on loan to Sinđelić Beograd) |
| 30 | MF | CHI | Sebastian Guerrero (on loan to Sinđelić Beograd) |
| 11 | FW | SRB | Aleksandar Stojiljković (on loan to Sinđelić Beograd) |
| — | GK | BIH | Čedomir Radić (to Sinđelić Beograd, was on loan at BASK) |
| — | DF | SRB | Miloš Pitulić (on loan to Sinđelić Beograd, was on loan at BASK) |
| — | MF | SRB | Andreja Lazović (on loan to Sinđelić Beograd, was on loan at BASK) |
| — | DF | SRB | Borislav Simić (released, was on loan at Sinđelić Beograd) |
| 26 | MF | SRB | Srđan Grujičić (to Kolubara) |

=== Spartak Subotica ===
In: Note: Flags indicate national team as defined under FIFA eligibility rules; some limited exceptions apply. Players may hold more than one non-FIFA nationality.

| No. | Pos. | Nation | Player |
|---|---|---|---|
| 20 | MF | MNE | Janko Tumbasević (on loan from Vojvodina) |
| 2 | MF | SRB | Stefan Petrović (from Radnički 1923) |
| 1 | GK | SRB | Marko Trkulja (on loan from Red Star Belgrade) |
| 4 | DF | SRB | Darko Lazić (on loan from Red Star Belgrade) |
| 19 | FW | SRB | Stefan Ilić (from Partizan youth) |

Out: Note: Flags indicate national team as defined under FIFA eligibility rules; some limited exceptions apply. Players may hold more than one non-FIFA nationality.

| No. | Pos. | Nation | Player |
|---|---|---|---|
| 2 | DF | SRB | Siniša Stevanović (to Novi Pazar) |
| 4 | DF | BIH | Nikola Popara (to Vojvodina) |
| 18 | FW | SRB | Miljan Milivojev (to Dolina) |
| 22 | DF | MNE | Marko Vidović (to (Moldova) Tiraspol) |
| 1 | GK | SRB | Milan Jovanić (to Vojvodina) |
| 3 | MF | SRB | Nemanja Marković (to Proleter Novi Sad) |
| 20 | MF | SRB | Darko Puškarić (to Vojvodina) |

=== Napredak ===
In: Note: Flags indicate national team as defined under FIFA eligibility rules; some limited exceptions apply. Players may hold more than one non-FIFA nationality.

| No. | Pos. | Nation | Player |
|---|---|---|---|
| 90 | FW | NGR | Patrick Friday Eze (from Rad) |
| 44 | DF | MKD | Stefan Aškovski (on loan from Partizan) |
| 11 | MF | SRB | Nikola Milanković (from (Kazakhstan) Atyrau) |
| 21 | MF | SRB | Dušan Mićić (from Voždovac) |
| 10 | MF | SRB | Stefan Vukmirović (from Jedinstvo Putevi) |
| 19 | FW | MNE | Bojan Božović (from Bežanija) |
| 34 | DF | SRB | Stevan Luković (from Red Star Belgrade) |
| 17 | FW | SRB | Nemanja Vidaković (from Novi Pazar) |
| 4 | DF | SRB | Ivan Milošević (from (Ukraine) Karpaty) |
| — | FW | SRB | Darko Simić (from Radnički 1923 youth team) |

Out: Note: Flags indicate national team as defined under FIFA eligibility rules; some limited exceptions apply. Players may hold more than one non-FIFA nationality.

| No. | Pos. | Nation | Player |
|---|---|---|---|
| 19 | FW | SRB | Nenad Mirosavljević (to Čukarički) |
| 10 | MF | SRB | Petar Bojić (to Čukarički) |
| 22 | MF | SRB | Predrag Jeremić (to Radnik Surdulica) |
| 17 | FW | SRB | Miloš Deletić (to (Romania) Săgeata Năvodari) |
| 21 | DF | SRB | Ivan Kostić (to Dolina) |
| 70 | GK | SRB | Marko Lazarević (to Sinđelić Beograd) |
| — | FW | SRB | Aleksa Božović (released, was on loan at Kolubara) |
| 3 | DF | SRB | Mladen Veselinović (to Donji Srem) |
| 4 | DF | SRB | Bogdan Milošević (to (France) Tours) |
| 29 | MF | SRB | Radomir Koković (released) |
| — | DF | SRB | Miloš Paris (released, was on loan at Kopaonik) |
| 33 | GK | SRB | Nenad Đurić (released) |

=== OFK Beograd ===
In: Note: Flags indicate national team as defined under FIFA eligibility rules; some limited exceptions apply. Players may hold more than one non-FIFA nationality.

| No. | Pos. | Nation | Player |
|---|---|---|---|
| — | DF | SRB | Dimitrije Tomović (from Bane) |
| 35 | DF | SRB | Miloš Obradović (from Novi Pazar) |
| 33 | MF | MDA | Vitalie Bulat (from Novi Pazar) |
| 29 | MF | SRB | Aleksandar Stanisavljević (from Sloga PM) |
| 1 | GK | SRB | Zlatko Zečević (from (North Macedonia) Rabotnički) |
| 19 | FW | MNE | Dejan Zarubica (from (Montenegro) Sutjeska) |
| — | DF | SRB | Nikola Šipčić (from FAP) |
| — | DF | SRB | Predrag Stanković (from Brodarac) |
| 18 | MF | SRB | Stojan Pilipović (from Sloboda Užice) |
| 26 | DF | SRB | Milan Savić (from (Belgium) Gent) |
| 10 | MF | MNE | Mitar Novaković (from (Russia) Amkar Perm) |
| 15 | DF | SRB | Marko Gajić (from Radnički Nova Pazova) |
| 2 | DF | SRB | Jovica Vasilić (from Sloboda Užice) |
| — | MF | AUT | Petar Živkov (from (Italy) Chievo) |
| — | DF | SRB | Branko Jovanović (from Red Star Belgrade) |
| — | FW | SRB | Bogdan Tepić (from ČSK Pivara) |
| 22 | FW | SRB | Ivica Jovanović (loan return from Radnički Niš) |

Out: Note: Flags indicate national team as defined under FIFA eligibility rules; some limited exceptions apply. Players may hold more than one non-FIFA nationality.

| No. | Pos. | Nation | Player |
|---|---|---|---|
| 10 | MF | SRB | Marko Perović (to (Thailand) Chainat) |
| 29 | DF | SRB | Stevan Bates (to (China) Hunan Billows) |
| 15 | DF | SRB | Petar Golubović (to (Italy) Roma) |
| 21 | MF | SRB | Ilija Tutnjević (to Jedinstvo Putevi) |
| 45 | GK | MNE | Vladan Giljen (to (Montenegro) Čelik Nikšić) |
| 36 | DF | SRB | Zdravko Kovačević (to Dinamo Pančevo) |
| — | DF | SRB | Ivan Karanfilovski (to Sloga PM, was on loan at Dinamo Pančevo) |
| 1 | GK | SRB | Bojan Pavlović (to (Georgia (country)) Zestafoni) |
| — | GK | MNE | Andrija Dragojević (to (Bosnia and Herzegovina) Velež, was on loan at (Montenegro) Lovćen) |
| — | DF | MNE | Mirko Muštur (released, was on loan at Bežanija) |
| — | DF | SRB | Dušan Stanković (on loan to Sloga PM, was on loan at Timok) |
| — | FW | SRB | Miloš Stanković (on loan to Sloga PM, was on loan at Timok) |
| — | GK | SRB | Marko Matić (released, was on loan at Jasenica) |
| 24 | FW | SRB | Marko Radivojević (released) |
| 30 | DF | SRB | Dušan Punoševac (on loan to Sloga PM) |
| — | MF | SRB | Miloš Brujić (on loan to Bežanija, was on loan at Sinđelić Beograd) |

=== Voždovac ===
In: Note: Flags indicate national team as defined under FIFA eligibility rules; some limited exceptions apply. Players may hold more than one non-FIFA nationality.

| No. | Pos. | Nation | Player |
|---|---|---|---|
| 6 | DF | BIH | Aleksandar Vasiljević (from Donji Srem) |
| 1 | GK | SRB | Zoran Popović (from Vojvodina) |
| 7 | MF | BIH | Mario Božić (from (Greece) Panachaiki) |
| 9 | FW | SRB | Marko Pavićević (from Borac Čačak) |
| 27 | GK | BIH | Nemanja Supić (from Novi Pazar) |
| 3 | DF | SRB | Josip Projić (from Jagodina) |
| 2 | DF | SRB | Duško Dukić (from Jagodina) |
| 21 | DF | SRB | Miloš Mihajlov (from (Norway) Sandnes Ulf) |
| 18 | MF | SRB | Saša Jovanović (from Rad) |
| 19 | MF | SRB | Stefan Tripković (from Rad) |
| 23 | DF | SRB | Nikola Todorić (from Rad) |

Out: Note: Flags indicate national team as defined under FIFA eligibility rules; some limited exceptions apply. Players may hold more than one non-FIFA nationality.

| No. | Pos. | Nation | Player |
|---|---|---|---|
| 9 | FW | SRB | Ognjen Ožegović (loan return to Red Star Belgrade) |
| 2 | MF | ROU | Cristian Muscalu (to (Portugal) Beira-Mar) |
| 3 | DF | SRB | Nikola Vasiljević (to (Bosnia and Herzegovina) Leotar) |
| 7 | MF | SRB | Nikola Lekić (to Proleter Novi Sad) |
| 18 | MF | SRB | Dejan Janković (to (Bosnia and Herzegovina) Velež) |
| 21 | MF | SRB | Saša Kiš (to Inđija) |
| — | MF | SRB | Miloš Filipović (on loan to Dolina, was on loan at BSK Borča) |
| 19 | FW | SRB | Vladimir Đilas (Metalac GM) |
| 1 | GK | SRB | Nikola Perić (to Jagodina) |
| 23 | MF | SRB | Dušan Mićić (to Napredak) |
| 6 | DF | SRB | Slobodan Lalić (to Čukarički) |
| 10 | MF | SRB | Aleksandar Stojković (to Metalac GM) |
| 12 | GK | SRB | Marko Knežević (to Bežanija) |
| — | FW | SRB | Vladimir Tufegdžić (to (North Macedonia) Euromilk, was on loan at Sloga PM) |

=== Radnički 1923 ===
In: Note: Flags indicate national team as defined under FIFA eligibility rules; some limited exceptions apply. Players may hold more than one non-FIFA nationality.

| No. | Pos. | Nation | Player |
|---|---|---|---|
| 17 | MF | SRB | Marko Adamović (from Rad) |
| 14 | FW | MKD | Dragan Čadikovski (from (Slovenia) Celje) |
| — | DF | GHA | Karim Alhassan (from (South Africa) Black Leopards) |
| 27 | FW | SRB | Dejan Miljuš (loan return from Pobeda Beloševac) |
| 2 | DF | SRB | Darko Bjelanović (from Pobeda Beloševac) |

Out: Note: Flags indicate national team as defined under FIFA eligibility rules; some limited exceptions apply. Players may hold more than one non-FIFA nationality.

| No. | Pos. | Nation | Player |
|---|---|---|---|
| 21 | MF | ARG | Matías Porcari (to (Uruguay) Juventud) |
| 28 | DF | SRB | Vladimir Otašević (to Novi Pazar) |
| 1 | GK | CRO | Marko Šimić (to Novi Pazar) |
| 31 | MF | SRB | Srđan Simović (released) |
| 89 | FW | SRB | Lazar Marjanović (to (Hungary) Diósgyőr) |
| 99 | FW | SRB | Bojan Malinić (released) |
| 20 | MF | SRB | Stefan Petrović (to Spartak Subotica) |

=== Sloboda Užice ===
In: Note: Flags indicate national team as defined under FIFA eligibility rules; some limited exceptions apply. Players may hold more than one non-FIFA nationality.

| No. | Pos. | Nation | Player |
|---|---|---|---|
| 55 | DF | SRB | Savo Raković (from (Hungary) Egri FC) |
| 17 | MF | SRB | Petar Stanojević (loan return from Železničar Lajkovac) |
| 44 | DF | BIH | Borislav Terzić (from (Georgia (country)) Zestafoni) |
| 21 | MF | SRB | Aleksandar Ćovin (from (Belarus) Slavia-Mozyr) |
| 4 | MF | FRA | Sacha Petshi (from (France) Troyes) |
| 9 | FW | SRB | Stefan Mihajlović (on loan from Red Star Belgrade) |
| 22 | MF | SRB | Novica Maksimović (from (Hungary) Lombard-Pápa) |
| 18 | MF | BIH | Nemanja Lekanić (from Sloga Kraljevo) |
| 3 | DF | SRB | Mitar Peković (from (Montenegro) Budućnost Podgorica) |
| 10 | FW | NGR | Kevin Amuneke (from (Portugal) Tondela) |

Out: Note: Flags indicate national team as defined under FIFA eligibility rules; some limited exceptions apply. Players may hold more than one non-FIFA nationality.

| No. | Pos. | Nation | Player |
|---|---|---|---|
| 9 | FW | AZE | Murad Hüseynov (to (Latvia) Daugava) |
| 8 | MF | BIH | Dario Purić (to (Bosnia and Herzegovina) Sarajevo) |
| 18 | MF | SRB | Vladimir Krstić (to Sloga PM) |
| 11 | MF | SRB | Dejan Babić (loan return to Partizan) |
| 10 | MF | SRB | Stojan Pilipović (to OFK Beograd) |
| 22 | MF | SRB | Mirko Petrović (to Jedinstvo Putevi) |
| 2 | DF | SRB | Jovica Vasilić (to OFK Beograd) |

=== Javor ===
In: Note: Flags indicate national team as defined under FIFA eligibility rules; some limited exceptions apply. Players may hold more than one non-FIFA nationality.

| No. | Pos. | Nation | Player |
|---|---|---|---|
| 11 | MF | SRB | Nemanja Zlatković (from (Greece) Panachaiki) |
| 18 | FW | SRB | Nikola Vujović (from Lokomotiva Beograd) |
| 23 | GK | SRB | Saša Mišić (from Jedinstvo Putevi) |
| 21 | MF | SRB | Stanimir Milošković (from (Greece) Aiginiakos) |
| 25 | DF | MNE | Aleksandar Šofranac (from (Montenegro) Mladost Podgorica) |
| 13 | FW | SRB | Stevan Račić (from (Montenegro) Čelik Nikšić) |
| 8 | MF | SRB | Đorđe Ivelja (from (Slovenia) Olimpija Ljubljana) |

Out: Note: Flags indicate national team as defined under FIFA eligibility rules; some limited exceptions apply. Players may hold more than one non-FIFA nationality.

| No. | Pos. | Nation | Player |
|---|---|---|---|
| 8 | MF | SRB | Vladimir Radivojević (to Rad) |
| 4 | DF | SRB | Željko Đokić (to (Austria) Wacker Innsbruck) |
| — | DF | BIH | Ognjen Petrović (to (Bosnia and Herzegovina) Kozara Gradiška, was on loan at (Bosnia and Herzegovina) Borac Banja Luka) |
| 23 | GK | BIH | Darjan Matović (on loan to Inđija) |
| 13 | FW | SRB | Vuk Sotirović (to Novi Pazar) |
| 21 | DF | SRB | Aleksandar Alempijević (to (Uzbekistan) Olmaliq) |
| — | MF | SRB | Uroš Ljubomirac (on loan to Inđija, previously bought from Lokomotiva Beograd) |

=== Donji Srem ===
In: Note: Flags indicate national team as defined under FIFA eligibility rules; some limited exceptions apply. Players may hold more than one non-FIFA nationality.

| No. | Pos. | Nation | Player |
|---|---|---|---|
| 40 | GK | SRB | Dragan Starčević (from Radnički Stobex) |
| 44 | MF | SRB | Miloš Mijić (from (Slovenia) Domžale) |
| 4 | MF | SRB | Uroš Košutić (loan return from Zemun) |
| — | DF | SRB | Ivan Šubert (loan return from Zemun) |
| 12 | GK | SRB | Matija Šegavac (loan return from Cement) |
| 88 | DF | SRB | Đorđe Crnomarković (from Šumadija Jagnjilo) |
| 18 | DF | SRB | Mladen Veselinović (from Napredak) |
| 13 | FW | BIH | Neđo Šuka (from (Bosnia and Herzegovina) Sutjeska Foča) |
| 5 | DF | SRB | Vladimir Nikitović (from Polet Ljubić) |
| 16 | DF | MNE | Stefan Zogović (from (Montenegro) Sutjeska Nikšić) |
| 25 | FW | MNE | Nemanja Ćosović (from (Montenegro) Rudar Pljevlja) |

Out: Note: Flags indicate national team as defined under FIFA eligibility rules; some limited exceptions apply. Players may hold more than one non-FIFA nationality.

| No. | Pos. | Nation | Player |
|---|---|---|---|
| — | MF | SRB | Saša Teofanov (on loan to Inđija, was on loan at Zemun) |
| 44 | DF | MKD | Stefan Aškovski (loan return to Partizan) |
| 1 | FW | SRB | Nemanja Čović (released) |
| 40 | GK | SRB | Mladen Živković (to (Bulgaria) Chernomorets Burgas) |
| 5 | DF | SRB | Vladimir Milašinović (to Inđija) |
| 4 | DF | BIH | Aleksandar Vasiljević (to Voždovac) |
| 88 | MF | SRB | Filip Stojanović (to (Malta) Naxxar Lions) |
| 13 | FW | SRB | Petar Ilić (to Proleter Novi Sad) |
| — | FW | SRB | Branislav Tošić (to Mačva Šabac) |

=== Rad ===
In: Note: Flags indicate national team as defined under FIFA eligibility rules; some limited exceptions apply. Players may hold more than one non-FIFA nationality.

| No. | Pos. | Nation | Player |
|---|---|---|---|
| 22 | MF | MKD | Perica Stančeski (free, last with (Bosnia and Herzegovina) Zvijezda Gradačac) |
| 12 | MF | SRB | Stefan Čolović (from (England) Tottenham) |
| 6 | DF | BIH | Saša Kolunija (free, last with (Iran) Saipa) |
| 34 | MF | SRB | Vuk Ranđić (from Sinđelić Beograd) |
| 7 | MF | SRB | Aleksandar Simić (from (Greece) Kerkyra) |
| 33 | DF | SRB | Srđa Knežević (from (Israel) Hapoel Acre) |
| 9 | FW | SRB | Nenad Srećković (from (Norway) Fredrikstad) |
| 8 | FW | SRB | Nenad Injac (from (Kazakhstan) Atyrau) |
| 11 | MF | SRB | Dejan Babić (on loan from Partizan) |
| 17 | DF | MKD | Aleksandar Lazevski (on loan from (Ukraine) Hoverla) |
| 15 | FW | SRB | Stefan Tripković (from (Estonia) Tallinna Kalev) |
| 14 | FW | SRB | Ognjen Ožegović (from Red Star Belgrade) |
| 27 | MF | SRB | Vladimir Radivojević (from Javor) |
| 13 | FW | SRB | Ivan Marković (from (South Korea) Gyeongnam) |

Out: Note: Flags indicate national team as defined under FIFA eligibility rules; some limited exceptions apply. Players may hold more than one non-FIFA nationality.

| No. | Pos. | Nation | Player |
|---|---|---|---|
| 33 | FW | NGR | Patrick Friday Eze (to Napredak) |
| 9 | FW | SRB | Uroš Đurđević (to (Netherlands) Vitesse Arnhem) |
| 7 | MF | SRB | Marko Adamović (to Radnički 1923) |
| 13 | MF | SRB | Stefan Dimić (to Čukarički) |
| 2 | DF | SRB | Uroš Vitas (to (Belgium) Gent) |
| 6 | DF | SRB | Milan Jagodić (to Jedinstvo Putevi) |
| 11 | MF | SRB | Milan Pršo (to Bežanija) |
| 17 | FW | SRB | Saša Varga (to Teleoptik) |
| 15 | MF | SRB | Ivan Rogač (to (Ukraine) Volyn Lutsk) |
| 22 | MF | SRB | Uglješa Radinović (to (Bosnia and Herzegovina) Rudar Prijedor) |
| 12 | GK | SRB | Filip Kljajić (to Partizan) |
| 8 | MF | SRB | Saša Jovanović (to Voždovac) |
| 27 | MF | SRB | Stefan Tripković (to Voždovac) |
| — | DF | SRB | Nikola Todorić (to Voždovac, was on loan at Srem Jakovo) |
| 14 | FW | SRB | Andrija Pavlović (to Čukarički) |
| — | MF | SRB | Dušan Pantelić (on loan to Teleoptik, was on loan at Srem Jakovo) |
| — | MF | SRB | Dušan Plavšić (to (Slovakia) Dukla Banská Bystrica, was on loan at Dolina Padina) |
| — | GK | BIH | Darko Dejanović (on loan to Žarkovo, was on loan at Srem Jakovo) |
| — | DF | BIH | Stefan Vukadin (on loan to Žarkovo) |
| — | MF | SRB | Uroš Tomović (on loan to Žarkovo, was on loan at Srem Jakovo) |
| — | FW | SRB | Nikola Ivković (on loan to Žarkovo, was on loan at Srem Jakovo) |

== See also ==
- Serbian SuperLiga
- 2013–14 Serbian SuperLiga
