= 2011–12 Serbian Cup =

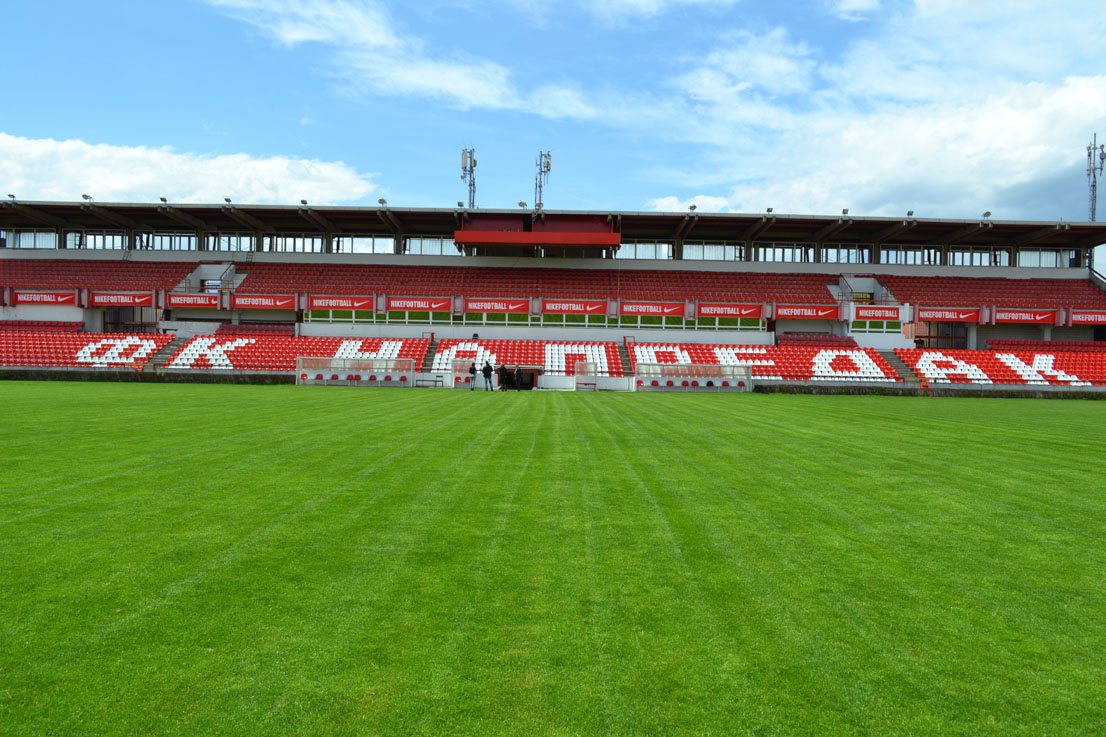
- Mladost Stadium hosted the final

Tournament details
- Country: Serbia

Final positions
- Champions: Red Star
- Runners-up: Borac Čačak

Tournament statistics
- Matches played: 40
- Goals scored: 77 (1.93 per match)
- Top goal scorer(s): Borja (Red Star) (4 goals)

The 2011–12 Serbian Cup season was the sixth season of the Serbian national football tournament.

The competition started on 31 August 2011 and concluded with the final on May 16, 2012.

The winner of the competition qualified for the second qualifying round of the 2012–13 UEFA Europa League.

== Preliminary round ==
A preliminary round was held in order to reduce the number of teams competing in the next round to 32 and featured 14 teams from Serbian lower divisions. The matches were played on 31 August 2011.

31 August 2011	Trepča (IV)	0–1	Kolubara (II)	Stadion u Žitkovcu, Zvečan
			Grkajac 60'	Attendance: 250

31 August 2011	Šumadija Jagnjilo (III)	1–0	Zemun (III)	Gradski Stadion, Jagnjilo
	Begović 69' (o.g.)			Attendance: 110

31 August 2011	Radnički Niš (II)	4–0	Dinamo Vranje (III)	Stadion Čair, Niš
	Milenković 3'; Pejčić 27'; Stefanović 69'; Milenković 81'			Attendance: 420

31 August 2011	Mačva Šabac (III)	0–0 (1–3 p)	Srem (II)	Gradski Stadion, Šabac
				Attendance: 95

31 August 2011	Donji Srem (II)	4–0	Big Bull Radnički (III)	SC Suvača, Pećinci
	Mrkajić 14'; Petković 39'; Petković 44'; Mrkajić 60'			Attendance: 180

31 August 2011	Mladi Radnik (II)	0–2	Teleoptik (II)	Vašarište, Požarevac
			Crnoglavac 67'; Jojić 83'	Attendance: 910

31 August 2011	Bežanija (II)	0–0 (4–5 p)	Novi Sad (II)	Stadion Bežanije, Belgrade
				Attendance: 1.000

Note: Roman numerals in brackets denote the league tier the clubs participated in during the 2011–12 season.

== Round of 32 ==
In this round, seven winners from the previous round were joined by all 16 teams from Serbian SuperLiga from 2010 to 2011, as well as the top 9 teams from Serbian First League from 2010 to 2011. The draw was held on September 9, 2011. The matches were played on 20, 21 and 27 September 2011. In total, around 23,050 spectators attended the games (avg. 1,441 per game).

20 September 2011	Metalac	3–0	Srem (II)	Stadion Mladost, Lučani
15:30	Petrović 25'; Ćirković 56'; Misdongarde 62'			Attendance: 200; Referee: Igor Paunović

21 September 2011	Radnički 1923	0–0 (4–2 p)	Rad	Stadion Čika Dača, Kragujevac
15:30				Attendance: 2.500; Referee: Aleksandar Vasić
	Penalties
	Lepović (penalty scored); Milošković (penalty scored); Ristić (penalty scored); Stojaković (penalty missed); Spalević (penalty scored)		(penalty scored) Koković; (penalty scored) Milivojević; (penalty missed) Ranđelović; (penalty missed) Perović

21 September 2011	Napredak Kruševac (II)	0–2	Spartak Subotica	Stadion Mladost, Kruševac
15:30			Despotović 2'; Despotović 35'	Attendance: 500; Referee: Bojan Nikolić

21 September 2011	Donji Srem (II)	0–1	Vojvodina	SC Suvača, Pećinci
15:30			Medojević 69'	Attendance: 1.000; Referee: Novica Andjelovski

21 September 2011	Hajduk Kula	0–1	Kolubara (II)	Stadion Hajduk, Kula
15:30			Obradović 90+1'	Attendance: 700; Referee: Slobodan Veselinović

21 September 2011	Banat (II)	2–0	BSK Borča	Karađorđev Park, Zrenjanin
15:30	Samardžić 13'; Milovanović 90+2'			Attendance: 400; Referee: Srđan Obradović

21 September 2011	Mladost Lučani (II)	1–2	Red Star	Stadion Mladost, Lučani
15:30	Milošević 85'		Kaluđerović 83'; Borja 90+1'	Attendance: 2.500; Referee: Milorad Mažić

21 September 2011	Sloboda Užice	1–1 (4–2 p)	Teleoptik (II)	Gradski Stadion na Begluku, Užice
15:30	Kasalica 14'		Jojić 66'	Attendance: 1.000; Referee: Dejan Santrač
	Penalties
	Kovačević (penalty scored); Thiago Galvão (penalty scored); Marić (penalty scored); Prtenjak (penalty scored)		(penalty scored) Ostojić; (penalty missed) Jojić; (penalty scored) Mitrović; (penalty missed) Crnoglavac

21 September 2011	Novi Pazar	0–3	Partizan	Gradski Stadion, Novi Pazar
15:30			Tomić 28'; S. Ilić 55'; Vukić 82'	Attendance: 8.000; Referee: Danilo Grujić

21 September 2011	Radnički Niš (II)	0–1	OFK Beograd	Stadion Čair, Niš
15:30			Purović 2'	Attendance: 3.500; Referee: Majo Vujović

21 September 2011	Borac Čačak	4–1	Radnički Sombor (II)	Stadion kraj Morave, Čačak
15:30	Živanović 37'; Knežević 52'; Damjanović 63'; Sseppuya 73'		Milić 85'	Attendance: 400; Referee: Dragan Krstić

21 September 2011	Šumadija Jagnjilo (III)	2–2 (5–6 p)	Inđija (II)	Gradski Stadion, Jagnjilo
15:30	Đorović 5'; Dabetić 12'		Lemajić 51'; Kekić 70'	Attendance: 1.000; Referee: Dejan Anđelković
	Penalties
	Dabetić (penalty missed); Pandurević (penalty scored); Vuković (penalty scored); Živanović (penalty scored); Soldatović (penalty missed); Stojanović (penalty scored); Urošević (penalty scored); Spasić (penalty missed)		(penalty scored) Cvetković; (penalty scored) Radovanović; (penalty missed) Vukojičić; (penalty scored) Kekić; (penalty missed) Kolarov; (penalty scored) Rodić; (penalty scored) Lemajić; (penalty scored) Knežević

21 September 2011	Smederevo	1–0	BASK (III)	Stadion FK Smederevo, Smederevo
15:30	Kovačević 73'			Attendance: 300; Referee: Novak Simović

21 September 2011	Čukarički (II)	0–0 (3–5 p)	Proleter Novi Sad (II)	Stadion Čukaričkog, Belgrade
15:30				Attendance: 150; Referee: Nenad Đokić
	Penalties
	Blagojevic (penalty missed); Hrnjak (penalty scored); Spasić (penalty scored); Nedeljković (penalty scored)		(penalty scored) Žigić; (penalty scored) Radović; (penalty scored) Rašiovan; (penalty scored) Đorović; (penalty scored) Radaković

21 September 2011	Javor Ivanjica	1–0	RFK Novi Sad (II)	Stadion kraj Moravice, Ivanjica
15:30	Luković 90+2'			Attendance: 400; Referee: Dejan Filipović

27 September 2011	Sinđelić Niš (II)	1–2	Jagodina	Stadion Čair, Niš
15:30	Marinković 77'		Mudrinski 40'; Mudrinski 90+3'	Attendance: 500; Referee: Danilo Mihajlović

Note: Roman numerals in brackets denote the league tier the clubs participate in during the 2011–12 season.

== Round of 16 ==
16 winners from previous round qualified for round. The draw for this round contained seeded and unseeded teams. Seedings were determined by last season's league standings. Seeded teams for this round: Partizan, Red Star, Vojvodina, Spartak Subotica, OFK Beograd, Sloboda Užice, Javor Ivanjica and Borac Čačak. Unseeded teams: Smederevo, Jagodina, Metalac, Inđija (II), Radnički 1923, Banat (II), Proleter Novi Sad (II) and Kolubara (II).The draw took place on 29 September 2011. The matches were played on 25 and 26 October 2011. In total, around 14100 spectators attended the games (avg. 1763 per game).

25 October 2011	Red Star	1–0	Banat (II)	Stadion FK Crvena Zvezda, Belgrade
18:00	Evandro 90+8' (pen.)			Attendance: 6.200; Referee: Srđan Obradović

26 October 2011	Spartak Subotica	1–1 (5–4 p)	Radnički 1923	Gradski Stadion, Subotica
14:00	Puškarić 56'		Stojaković 54'	Attendance: 700; Referee: Milenko Vukadinović
	Penalties
	Torbica (penalty scored); Simović (penalty scored); Šarac (penalty scored); Puškarić (penalty scored); Joksimović (penalty scored)		(penalty scored) Milošković; (penalty scored) Lepović; (penalty scored) Ristić; (penalty missed) Živadinović; (penalty scored) Spalević

26 October 2011	OFK Beograd	5–0	Kolubara (II)	Omladinski Stadium, Belgrade
14:00	Purović 7'; Purović 16'; Osmanagić 50'; Takács 71'; Takács 90'			Attendance: 300; Referee: Milan Jeremić

26 October 2011	Inđija (II)	1–2	Vojvodina	Stadion FK Inđija, Inđija
14:00	Vukojičić 21'		Merebashvili 71'; Ilić 83'	Attendance: 1.000; Referee: Vlado Glođović

26 October 2011	Sloboda Užice	1–1 (2–4 p)	Smederevo	Gradski Stadion na Begluku, Užice
14:00	Goločevac 52'		Brašanac 58'	Attendance: 1.500; Referee: Dragan Krstić
	Penalties
	Sa. Kovačević (penalty scored); Thiago Galvão (penalty missed); Pejović (penalty scored); Vasilić (penalty missed)		(penalty scored) Brašanac; (penalty scored) St. Kovačević; (penalty missed) Trujić; (penalty scored) Ćeran; (penalty scored) D. Živković

26 October 2011	Proleter Novi Sad (II)	0–0 (1–4 p)	Borac Čačak	Stadion Slana Bara, Novi Sad
14:00				Attendance: 900; Referee: Dejan Anđelković
	Penalties
	O. Damjanović (penalty missed); Radović (penalty missed); Rašiovan (penalty scored)		(penalty scored) J. Damjanović; (penalty scored) Živanović; (penalty scored) William Alves; (penalty scored) Radivojević

26 October 2011	Jagodina	1–1 (2–4 p)	Javor Ivanjica	Stadion FK Jagodina, Jagodina
14:00	Marjanović 66'		Odita 90'	Attendance: 500; Referee: Majo Vujović
	Penalties
	Stojković (penalty scored); Đenić (penalty missed); Mudrinski (penalty missed); Tomić (penalty scored)		(penalty scored) Eliomar; (penalty scored) Luković; (penalty scored) Vlašić; (penalty scored) Ostojić

26 October 2011	Partizan	3−1	Metalac	Stadion FK Partizan, Belgrade
18:00	Vukić 7'; Vukić 10'; Babović 90+4'		51' Simović	Attendance: 3.000; Referee: Igor Paunović

Note: Roman numerals in brackets denote the league tier the clubs participate in during the 2011–12 season.

== Quarter-finals ==
The eight winners from the Second Round qualified for this round. The draw for this round took place on 2 November 2011. Teams were seeded and unseeded based on the last season's league standings. Seeded teams: Partizan, Red Star, Vojvodina and Spartak Subotica. Unseeded teams: OFK Beograd, Javor Ivanjica, Borac Čačak and Smederevo. The matches took place on November 23, 2011. In total, around 6500 spectators attended the games (avg. 1625 per game).

23 November 2011	Borac Čačak	0−0 (4–2 p)	Spartak Subotica	Stadion kraj Morave, Čačak
13:00				Attendance: 500; Referee: Dragan Krstić
	Penalties
	William Alves (penalty scored); Jovanović (penalty scored); Radivojević (penalty scored); Miličić (penalty missed); Mladenović (penalty scored)		(penalty missed) Torbica; (penalty missed) Simović; (penalty scored) Mirić; (penalty scored) Čović

23 November 2011	OFK Beograd	0−2	Partizan	Omladinski Stadium, Belgrade
13:00			Diarra 6'; L. Marković 54'	Attendance: 1000; Referee: Vlado Glođović

23 November 2011	Vojvodina	1−0	Javor Ivanjica	Karadjordje stadium, Novi Sad
16:00	Oumarou 88'			Attendance: 1000; Referee: Danilo Mihajlović

23 November 2011	Red Star	4−0	Smederevo	Stadion FK Crvena Zvezda, Belgrade
18:00	Bruno Mezenga 31', 60'; Evandro 42'; Borja 77'			Attendance: 4000; Referee: Majo Vujović

== Semi-finals ==
The four winners from the previous round qualified for the semi-finals. As in the 2010-11 Serbian Cup the semi-finals were played over two legs. First leg matches were scheduled for March 21, 2012. The second legs were played on April 11, 2012. There was no seeding in the draw for this round.

Team 1	Agg.	Team 2	1st leg	2nd leg
Red Star	4–0	Partizan	2–0	2–0
Borac Čačak	1–0	Vojvodina	0–0	1–0

=== First legs ===
21 March 2012 SF	Borac Čačak	0–0	Vojvodina	Čačak, Serbia
14:00				Stadium: Stadion kraj Morave; Attendance: 1,500; Referee: Milenko Vukadinović

21 March 2012 SF	Red Star	2–0	Partizan	Belgrade, Serbia
19:00	Milunović 19'; Kasalica 76'			Stadium: Stadion FK Crvena Zvezda; Attendance: 48,736; Referee: Milorad Mažić

=== Second legs ===
11 April 2012 SF	Vojvodina	0–1 (0–1 agg.)	Borac Čačak	Novi Sad, Serbia
17:00			Knežević 65'	Stadium: Karadjordje stadium Attendance: 5,000; Referee: Milan Karadžić

11 April 2012 SF	Partizan	0–2 (0–4 agg.)	Red Star	Belgrade, Serbia
19:30			Lazović 63'; Borja 81'	Stadium: Stadion FK Partizan; Attendance: 24,651; Referee: Milorad Mažić

== Final ==
The two winners from the semi-finals qualified for the Final. The game was played on May 16, 2012, at Mladost stadium in Kruševac. Game was originally to be organized on Karađorđe stadium in Novi Sad.

16 May 2012
20:00
F

Red Star	2–0	Borac Čačak
Evandro 40'; Borja 85'	Report

Mladost stadium, Kruševac
Attendance: 11,000
Referee: Milorad Mažić

Red Star	Borac Čačak

Red Star:
GK	1	(Montenegro) Boban Bajković
RB	14	(Serbia) Nikola Mikić
CB	13	(Serbia) Nikola Maksimović
CB	3	(Serbia) Duško Tošić
LB	25	(Serbia) Filip Mladenović
DM	4	(Serbia) Srđan Mijailović
CM	15	(Serbia) Luka Milivojević	(yellow card) 63'	(substituted off) 80'
CM	10	(Brazil) Evandro Goebel	40'
RW	8	(Serbia) Darko Lazović
LW	17	(Montenegro) Filip Kasalica		(substituted off) 78'
CF	19	(Colombia) Cristian Borja	85' (yellow card) 86'	(substituted off) 89'
Substitutes:
FW	16	(Serbia) Luka Milunović		(substituted on) 78'
MF	20	(Brazil) Cadú		(substituted on) 80'
MF	29	(Montenegro) Marko Vešović		(substituted on) 89'
Manager:
(Croatia) Robert Prosinečki

Borac Čačak:
GK	16	(Serbia) Nikola Milojević
RB	23	(Serbia) Bogdan Miličić	(yellow card) 31'
CB	4	(Serbia) Aleksandar Ignjatović	(yellow card) 39'
CB	44	(Serbia) Siniša Radanović
LB	88	(Montenegro) Stevan Reljić
DM	24	(Serbia) Vasilije Prodanović	(yellow card) 53'
CM	6	(North Macedonia) Stefan Spirovski		(substituted off) 58'
CM	14	(Montenegro) Marko Mugoša		(substituted off) 70'
RM	77	(Serbia) Filip Knežević
LM	7	(Serbia) Jovan Radivojević		(substituted off) 82'
CF	10	(Serbia) Marko Pavićević
Substitutes:
MF	20	(Brazil) William Alves		(substituted on) 58'
MF	19	(Serbia) Marko Zoćević		(substituted on) 70'
FW	11	(Serbia) Miloš Živanović		(substituted on) 82'
Manager:
(Serbia) Slavko Vojičić

== Top scorers ==
Rank	Player	Club	Goals
1	(Colombia) Cristian Borja	Red Star	4
2	(Brazil) Evandro	Red Star	3
2	(Serbia) Zvonimir Vukić	Partizan	3
2	(Montenegro) Milan Purović	OFK Beograd	3
3	(Hungary) Tamás Takács	OFK Beograd	2
3	(Serbia) Đorđe Despotović	Spartak	2
3	(Montenegro) Filip Kasalica	Sloboda Užice / Red Star	2
3	(Serbia) Ognjen Mudrinski	Jagodina	2
