= Mladen Veselinović =

Mladen Veselinović may refer to:

- Mladen Veselinović (Bosnian footballer) (born 1993)
- Mladen Veselinović (Serbian footballer) (born 1992)
