= Marko Ristić =

Marko Ristić may refer to:

- Marko Ristić (surrealist) (1902–1984), Serbian surrealist poet
- Marko Ristić (footballer, born 1987), Serbian association football player
- Marko Ristić (footballer, born 2004), Slovenian association football player
