= Mladost Stadium (Kruševac) =

Stadium in Kruševac, Serbia

Stadion Mladost
- Stadion pod Bagdalom
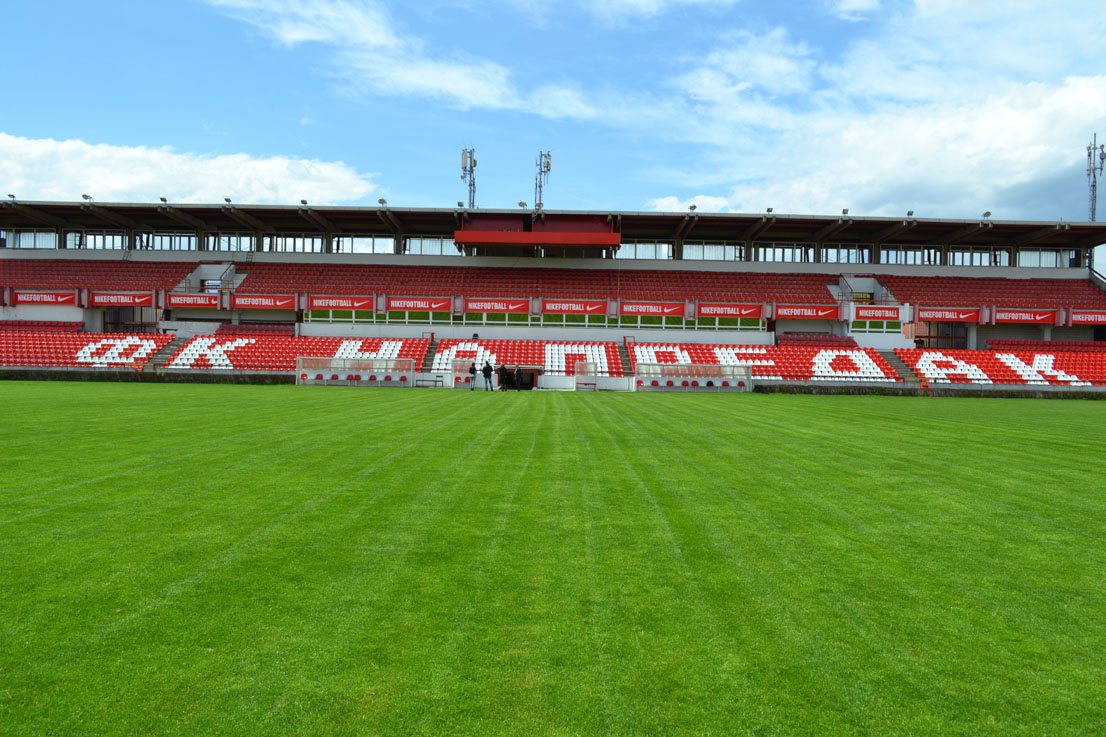
- Interactive map of Stadion Mladost
- Full name: Stadion Mladost
- Location: Kruševac, Serbia
- Coordinates: 43°34′59.21″N 21°20′17.24″E
- Owner: Napredak Kruševac
- Operator: Napredak Kruševac
- Capacity: 10,331
- Surface: Hybrid grass
- Scoreboard: LED (Philips brand)

Construction
- Built: 1976
- Renovated: 2011–12

Tenants
- Napredak Kruševac (1976–present); Trayal Kruševac (2018–2021; 2022–present)

Stadion Mladost (English: Youth Stadium) is a multi-use all-seated stadium in Kruševac, Serbia. It is currently used mostly for football matches and is the home ground of Napredak Kruševac. The stadium has a seating capacity for 10,331 people. The stadium was the venue for the final of the 2011-12 Serbian Cup.

== History ==
The stadium was built in 1976 in a record time of 60 days. At the time of its establishment, it had a capacity for 25,000 people.

=== 2011-12 reconstruction ===
Reconstruction of Mladost Stadium began in November 2011; a sum of the equivalent of €1.5 million funded the project. The renovation was complete by the end of April 2012 and the stadium was chosen to be the venue of the 2012 Serbian Cup Final on 16 May 2012. The stadium was officially reopened on 24 April 2012 by Oliver Dulić.

== Notable matches ==
=== International matches ===
Date		Result		Competition
27 March 2003	Serbia and Montenegro	1–2	Bulgaria	Friendly
10 October 2019	Serbia	1–0	Paraguay	Friendly

== Gallery ==
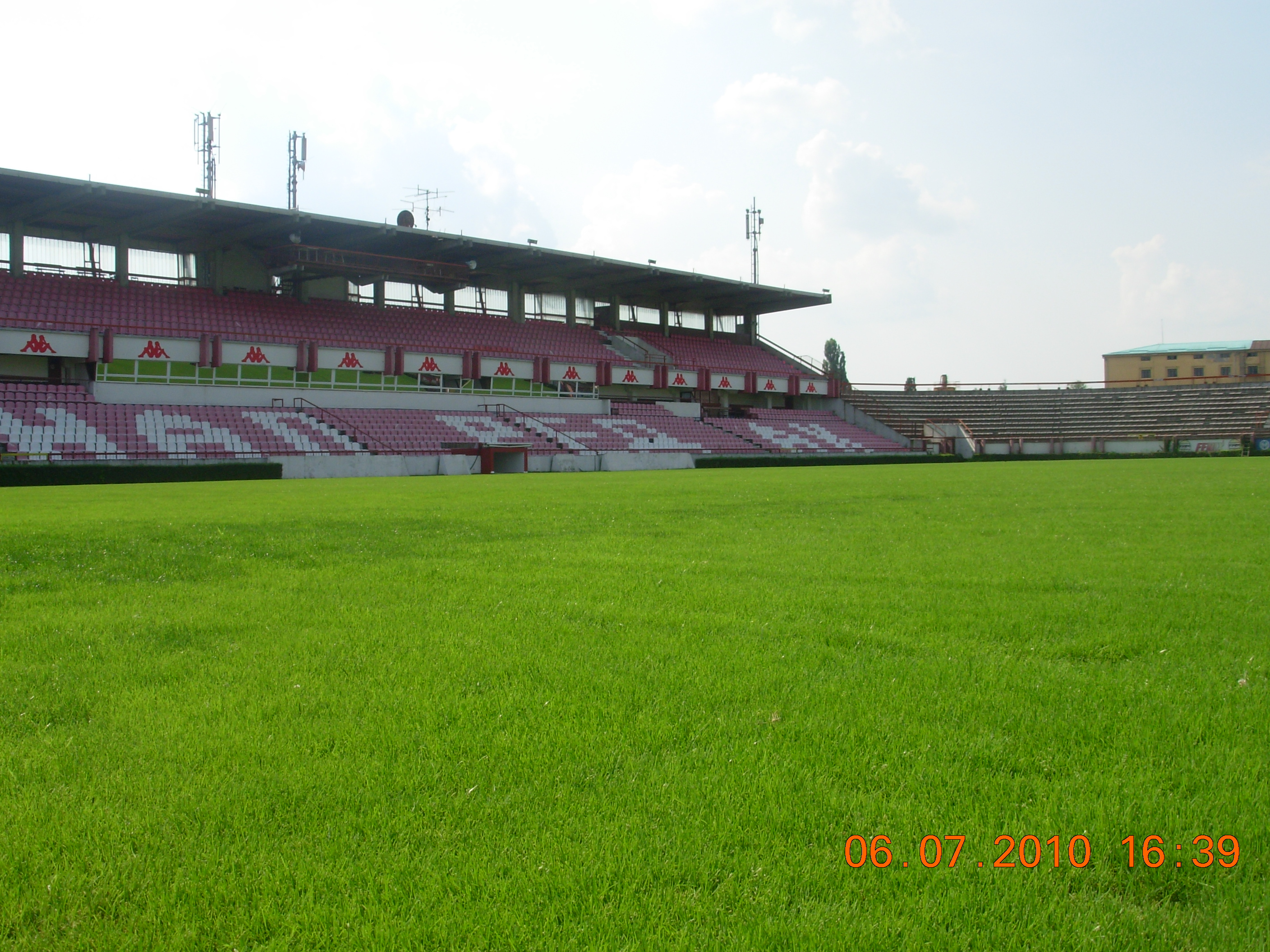
Mladost Stadium in 2010 before reconstruction began

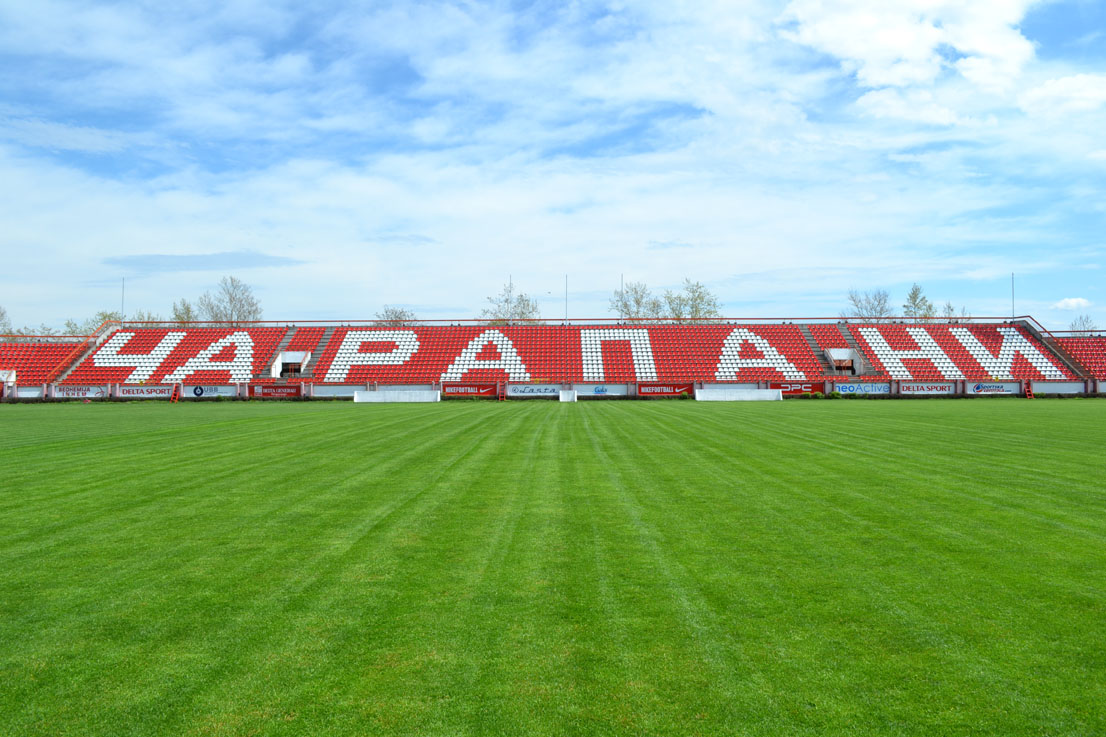
The East stand bears the word "Čarapani" in Serbian Cyrillic

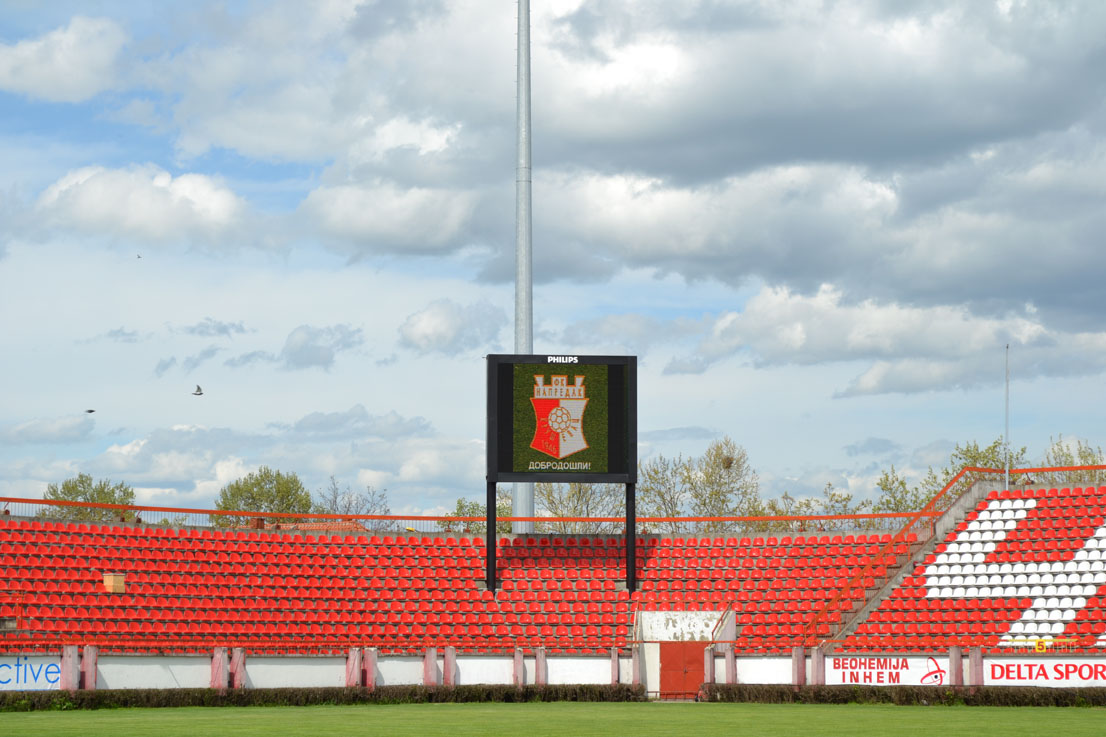
The new LED score display

== See also ==
- List of football stadiums in Serbia
