= Suad Nokić =

Serbian-Bosniak footballer

Personal information
- Date of birth: 16 August 1993 (age 33)
- Place of birth: Novi Pazar, FR Yugoslavia
- Height: 1.86 m (6 ft 1 in)
- Position: Midfielder

Youth career
- –2012: Novi Pazar

Senior career*
Years	Team	Apps	(Gls)
2012–2014	Novi Pazar	2	(0)
2014–2015	FK Jošanica		
- * Club domestic league appearances and goals

Suad Nokić (Serbian Cyrillic: Суад Нокић; born 16 August 1993) is a Serbian-Bosniak retired footballer.

== Early career ==
Suad Nokić born in Novi Pazar, began his career in his native Serbia playing for young team of FK Novi Pazar. In 2012 he made his debut in Serbian SuperLiga playing against OFK Beograd.
