= Igor Radović =

Montenegrin footballer

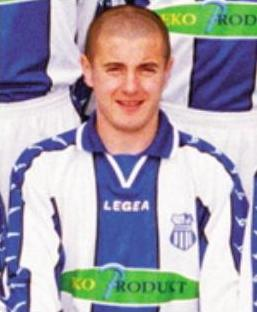

Personal information
- Full name: Igor Radović
- Date of birth: 26 January 1978 (age 48)
- Place of birth: Nikšić, SFR Yugoslavia
- Height: 1.75 m (5 ft 9 in)
- Position: Defender

Youth career
- Sutjeska Nikšić

Senior career*
Years	Team	Apps	(Gls)
1994–1996	Igalo HTP Boka	34	(5)
1996–2000	Sutjeska Nikšić	86	(2)
2000–2001	Milicionar	20	(0)
2001–2005	OFK Beograd	45	(0)
2004–2005	→ Hajduk Beograd (loan)	11	(0)
2005	Hajduk Kula	4	(0)
2006	Pobeda	5	(1)
2006–2007	Vojvodina	7	(0)
2007–2008	Mladost Podgorica	32	(0)
2008–2010	Palić	40	(2)
2010–2011	Novi Sad	5	(0)
2011–2012	Proleter Novi Sad	4	(0)
2012–2013	Bačka	40	(0)
2014	Radnički Sombor	9	(0)
2014	OFK Odžaci		
2015	PIK Prigrevica	11	(0)
2015–2017	TSC	46	(1)
- * Club domestic league appearances and goals

Igor Radović (Serbian Cyrillic: Игор Радовић; born 26 January 1978) is a Montenegrin retired footballer.

== Club career ==
He started his career in his hometown club FK Sutjeska Nikšić, but was in Serbian clubs that, since 2000, in the top league, he spend much of his career. FK Milicionar, OFK Beograd, FK Hajduk Kula and FK Vojvodina are the clubs he had played for, before returning, in 2007, to Montenegro to play in one season with FK Mladost Podgorica.
