= Sead Župić =

Serbian footballer

Personal information
- Date of birth: 18 May 1994 (age 32)
- Place of birth: Novi Pazar, FR Yugoslavia
- Height: 1.91 m (6 ft 3 in)
- Position: Midfielder

Senior career*
Years	Team	Apps	(Gls)
2013–2014	Novi Pazar	1	(0)
2014	→ Jošanica (loan)	9	(2)
2014–2015	Bane Raška		
2015–2018	Jošanica		
2018	Jagodina		
2019	Novi Pazar		
2019–2022	Jošanica		
- * Club domestic league appearances and goals as of 9 October 2014

Sead Župić (Serbian Cyrillic: Сеад Жупић; born 18 May 1994) is a Serbian footballer who plays as a midfielder. He is a son of Bajro Župić.
