= Stevan Kovačević =

Serbian footballer

Personal information
- Full name: Stevan Kovačević
- Date of birth: 9 January 1988 (age 38)
- Place of birth: Kragujevac, SFR Yugoslavia
- Height: 1.80 m (5 ft 11 in)
- Position: Midfielder

Team information
- Current team: Borac Čačak
- Number: 22

Youth career
- Partizan

Senior career*
Years	Team	Apps	(Gls)
2007–2008	Radnički Obrenovac	44	(11)
2008–2010	Naval	1	(0)
2010	→ Covilhã (loan)	1	(0)
2011–2012	Smederevo	35	(1)
2012–2013	Arouca	28	(3)
2014	Inđija	12	(4)
2014–2017	Sutjeska Nikšić	67	(2)
2017–2018	Javor Ivanjica	14	(1)
2018–2022	Radnički Kragujevac	107	(11)
2022	Radnički Sremska Mitrovica	10	(0)
2023–	Borac Čačak	26	(1)
- * Club domestic league appearances and goals as of 1 July 2025

Stevan Kovačević (Serbian Cyrillic: Стеван Koвaчeвић; born 9 January 1988) is a Serbian professional footballer who plays as a midfielder for Borac Čačak.
