= Nemanja Crnoglavac =

Serbian footballer

Personal information
- Full name: Nemanja Crnoglavac
- Date of birth: 13 January 1990 (age 36)
- Place of birth: Belgrade, SFR Yugoslavia
- Height: 1.85 m (6 ft 1 in)
- Position: Defender

Senior career*
Years	Team	Apps	(Gls)
2008–2010	Zemun	50	(2)
2010–2011	Spartak Subotica	1	(0)
2011–2012	Teleoptik	31	(1)
2012–2013	Hajduk Kula	9	(0)
2013–2016	Teleoptik	24	(1)

International career
2008–2009	Serbia U19	7	(0)
- * Club domestic league appearances and goals as of 22 January 2015

Nemanja Crnoglavac (Serbian Cyrillic: Немања Црноглавац; born 13 January 1990) is a Serbian retired footballer who played as a defender.

== Club career ==
Crnoglavac started his career with Zemun in the 2007–08 season. He also played for Spartak Subotica, Teleoptik and Hajduk Kula.

== International career ==
Crnoglavac represented Serbia at the 2009 UEFA Under-19 Championship.
