= Filip Knežević =

Serbian footballer (born 1991)

Filip Knežević Филип Кнежевић
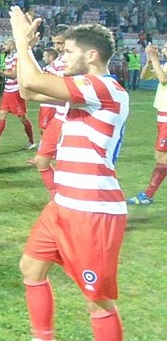
- Knežević with Borac Čačak in 2015

Personal information
- Date of birth: 8 November 1991 (age 35)
- Place of birth: Raška, SFR Yugoslavia
- Height: 1.82 m (5 ft 11 1/2 in)
- Position: Winger

Youth career
- Bane

Senior career*
Years	Team	Apps	(Gls)
2009–2012	Borac Čačak	79	(4)
2012–2016	Partizan	1	(0)
2013–2014	→ Radnički 1923 (loan)	23	(4)
2014–2015	→ Vitória Guimarães B (loan)	18	(1)
2015	→ Borac Čačak (loan)	20	(8)
2016	Čukarički	11	(0)
2016–2017	Vojvodina	15	(0)
2017–2018	Borac Čačak	22	(2)
2018–2019	Ashdod	18	(0)
2019–2020	Radnički Niš	25	(0)
2020–2021	Proleter Novi Sad	33	(6)
2021–2022	SHB Da Nang	0	(0)
2022	Sutjeska Nikšić	23	(4)
2023	Budućnost Podgorica	14	(2)
2023–2024	Novi Pazar	11	(0)

International career
2011	Serbia U21	3	(0)
- * Club domestic league appearances and goals as of 12 February 2024

Filip Knežević (Serbian Cyrillic: Филип Кнежевић; born 8 November 1991) is a Serbian footballer who most recently played as a winger for Novi Pazar.

== Club career ==
=== Borac Čačak ===
Before making his professional debut for Borac Čačak, Knežević was the top goalscorer of Borac's youth team. He made his debut for Borac Čačak at the age of 17 in the 2009–10 season, during which he scored one goal in 23 league appearances. In the following seasons he would become Borac's most prolific attacking player in terms of appearances. By the time he left Borac, he was regarded as one of the brightest football talents in Serbia, with the Serbian press even comparing him to Cristiano Ronaldo due to his signature dribbling and speed.

=== Partizan ===
On 16 June 2012, Knežević signed a four-year contract with Partizan, and was assigned the number 77 on his jersey. By December 2012, he featured for Partizan in just one league match, with coach Vladimir Vermezović giving him only 50 minutes of playing time over his first four months at the club.

==== Loan to Radnički 1923 ====
He then spent the 2013–14 season on loan with Radnički 1923. On October 19, 2013, Knežević scored a brace in Radnički's 3-2 win against OFK Beograd. On May 3, 2014, Knežević scored in Radnički's 1-0 win against Čukarički, in a match that determined whether or not Radnički would remain in the SuperLiga or get demoted to the Serbian second tier.

==== Loan to Vitória de Guimarães ====
On 4 July 2014, Knežević signed a loan deal with Primeira Liga side Vitória Guimarães. However, he spent most of his time at the B team, playing in Segunda Liga.

==== Loan to Borac Čačak ====
In July 2015, Knežević returned to FK Borac Čačak.

=== Čukarički ===
Finally, after three-and-a-half years at Partizan, where he played only a handful of games, spending most of his time on loans, on 10 February 2016, Knežević signed for another Belgrade-based club Čukarički.

=== Vojvodina ===
On 16 August 2016, Knežević signed a two-and-a-half-year deal with Vojvodina.

=== Return to Borac Čačak ===
In summer 2017, Knežević returned to Borac Čačak as a single player, taking number 1 jersey.

== International career ==
Knežević played three matches for the Serbian national under-21 team, making his debut in a friendly against Ukraine U21 on 29 March 2011. He recorded two more appearances that year.

== Career statistics ==
As of 5 May 2018

Club	Season	League		Cup		Continental		Total	
Club	Season	Apps	Goals	Apps	Goals	Apps	Goals	Apps	Goals
Borac Čačak	2009–10	23	1	1	0	–		24	1
Borac Čačak	2010–11	29	3	1	0	–		30	3
Borac Čačak	2011–12	27	0	6	2	–		33	2
Borac Čačak	Total	79	4	8	2	–		87	6
Partizan	2012–13	1	0	–		1	0	2	0
Partizan	Total	1	0	–		1	0	2	0
Radnički Kragujevac (loan)	2013–14	23	4	–		–		23	4
Radnički Kragujevac (loan)	Total	23	4	–		–		23	4
Vitória de Guimarães B (loan)	2014–15	18	1	–		–		18	1
Vitória de Guimarães B (loan)	Total	18	1	–		–		18	1
Borac Čačak (loan)	2015–16	20	8	2	0	–		22	8
Borac Čačak (loan)	Total	20	8	2	0	–		22	8
Čukarički	2015–16	10	1	–		–		10	1
Čukarički	2016–17	1	0	–		3	0	4	0
Čukarički	Total	11	1	–		3	0	14	1
Vojvodina	2016–17	15	0	4	0	–		19	0
Vojvodina	Total	15	0	4	0	–		19	0
Borac Čačak	2017–18	22	2	2	1	–		24	3
Borac Čačak	Total	22	2	2	1	–		24	3
Career total		189	20	16	3	4	0	209	23

== Honours ==
Borac Čačak

- Serbian Cup Runner-up: 2011–12

Partizan

- Serbian SuperLiga: 2012–13
