= Jovan Radivojević =

Serbian footballer

Personal information
- Full name: Jovan Radivojević
- Date of birth: 29 October 1982 (age 44)
- Place of birth: Novi Sad, SFR Yugoslavia
- Height: 1.75 m (5 ft 9 in)
- Position: Midfielder

Youth career
- 1992–1993: Crvena Zvezda Novi Sad
- 1993–2001: Novi Sad

Senior career*
Years	Team	Apps	(Gls)
2001–2003	Novi Sad	37	(4)
2003–2008	Hajduk Kula	143	(14)
2008–2010	Rad	52	(2)
2010–2011	OFK Beograd	17	(2)
2011–2012	Borac Čačak	25	(3)
2012	Leotar	14	(3)
2013	Banat Zrenjanin	9	(2)
2013–2014	Zvijezda Gradačac	26	(3)
2014	Proleter Novi Sad	11	(1)
Total		334	(34)
- * Club domestic league appearances and goals as of 23 November 2014

Jovan Radivojević (Serbian Cyrillic: Јован Радивојевић; born 29 October 1982) is a Serbian retired footballer.

== Career statistics ==
Club	Season	League	
Club	Season	Apps	Goals
Hajduk Kula	2002–03	9	0
Hajduk Kula	2003–04	28	3
Hajduk Kula	2004–05	23	3
Hajduk Kula	2005–06	29	3
Hajduk Kula	2006–07	28	1
Hajduk Kula	2007–08	26	4
Hajduk Kula	Total	143	14
