= Igor Nedeljković =

Serbian footballer

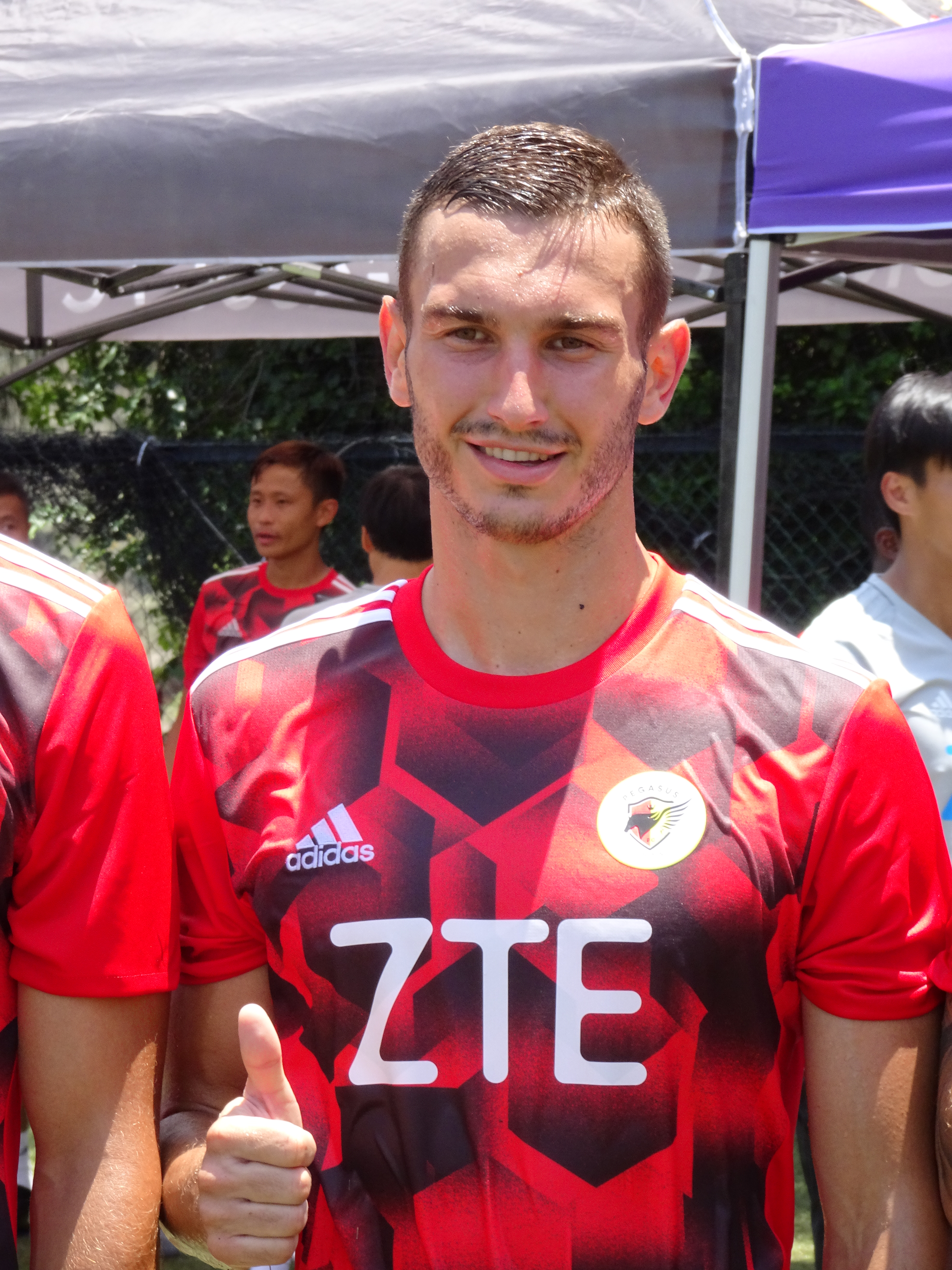
- Nedeljković with Hong Kong Pegasus in July 2017

Personal information
- Date of birth: 24 September 1991 (age 35)
- Place of birth: Belgrade, Serbia, Yugoslavia
- Height: 1.84 m (6 ft 0 in)
- Position: Striker

Team information
- Current team: Qala Saints

Youth career
- 2008–2009: Železnik

Senior career*
| Years | Team | Apps | (Gls) |
| 2009–2012 | Čukarički | 30 | (2) |
| 2013–2014 | Sutjeska Nikšić | 1 | (0) |
| 2014–2017 | Sileks | 91 | (27) |
| 2017–2018 | Hong Kong Pegasus | 4 | (2) |
| 2018 | Flamurtari Vlorë | 15 | (2) |
| 2018–2019 | Rabotnički | 11 | (0) |
| 2019–2022 | Għajnsielem | 20 | (33) |
| 2022 | Ħamrun Spartans | 0 | (0) |
| 2022–2023 | Nadur Youngsters | 21 | (5) |
| 2023– | Qala Saints | | |
- * Club domestic league appearances and goals as of 14:38, 5 May 2019 (UTC)

Igor Nedeljković (Serbian Cyrillic: Игор Недељковић; born 24 September 1991) is a Serbian professional footballer who plays as a striker for Gozitan side Qala Saints.

== Early life ==
Nedeljković was born in Belgrade, Serbia. As a young player, he started to play for his local team FK Zeleznik.As a professional soccer player he is closely related to the other sports such as Tennis and Basketball. His favourite tennis player is Novak Djokovic

== Club career ==
=== FK Čukarički ===
In 2009, Nedeljković began his professional career with FK Čukarički who made 31 appearances and scored two goals.

=== FK Sutjeska Nikšić ===
In 2013, Igor Nedeljković signed for FK Sutjeska Nikšić on a one-year deal.

=== FK Sileks ===
In 2014, Nedeljković joined FK Sileks on a three-year deal contract. There, he scored 27 goals in 93 appearances becoming one of the main strikers of the team.

=== Hong Kong Pegasus ===
On 27 July 2017, Nedeljković joined Hong Kong Premier League side Hong Kong Pegasus. On 26 August 2017, he making his debut in a 1–0 away win against Southern District after being named in the starting line-up and scoring his side's only goal from penalty kick.

=== Flamurtari Vlorë ===
On 7 December 2017, Nedeljković signed Albanian Superliga side Flamurtari Vlorë. On 26 January 2018, he made his debut in a 1–0 home win against Partizani Tirana after coming on as a substitute at 46th minute in place of Victor Juffo.Nedeljkovic scored two goals against Lushnja in the cup match and in an away game against Luftetari. After some economical problems regarding club finances, he broke the contract.

=== FK Rabotnički ===
After a short experience with Flamurtari FC, Nedeljkovic joined FK Rabotnički and made 11 appearances.

=== Għajnsielem ===
Nedeljković joined Għajnsielem in summer 2019. Since the first season, Nedeljković managed to score 20 goals in 13 appearances and won the Player of the month award in December. The second season started in the best way possible by scoring 12 goals in 7 appearances, 2 of them in league cup matches.

=== Ħamrun Spartans ===
On 1st of July 2022, Nedeljkovic joined Ħamrun Spartans. He signed a 1-year contract and was given the number 35 shirt. He made his debut for the club on 7th of July against FC Alashkert in Europa Conference League.
