= Vladimir Milenković =

Serbian footballer

Personal information
- Full name: Vladimir Milenković
- Date of birth: 22 June 1982 (age 44)
- Place of birth: Niš, SFR Yugoslavia
- Height: 1.80 m (5 ft 11 in)
- Position: Striker

Senior career*
Years	Team	Apps	(Gls)
2000–2007	Radnički Niš		
2005	→ Vorskla Poltava (loan)	14	(4)
2008	Rudar Pljevlja	14	(4)
2009	Primorje	15	(6)
2009	Interblock	13	(6)
2010–2011	Polonia Bytom	8	(0)
2010–2011	Polonia Bytom (ME)	9	(8)
2011–2013	Jagodina	23	(1)
2013	→ Timok (loan)	7	(3)
2013–2015	Radnički Niš	29	(1)
2015–2016	Sinđelić Beograd	10	(0)
- * Club domestic league appearances and goals

Vladimir Milenković (Serbian Cyrillic: Владимир Миленковић; born 22 June 1982) is a Serbian retired footballer who played as a striker.

== Career ==
Born in Niš, he played with his hometown club Radnički Niš until 2007 with the exception of a short spell in 2005 as a loaned player with Ukrainian Vorskla Poltava. Since Radnički was relegated in the 2007–08 season he moved to Montenegrin First League club Rudar Pljevlja where he played between January 2008 and January 2009. That winter he moved to Slovenian First League club Primorje and next summer he moved to another Slovenian club Interblock where he would play 6 months. In January 2010 he moved to Polish top league club Polonia Bytom. In summer 2011 he returned to Serbia and joined Serbian SuperLiga side Jagodina. During the second half of the 2012–13 season he played on loan with Timok in the Serbian First League. In summer 2013 he returned to the top league signing with his former club Radnički Niš.
