= Petar Glintić =

Serbian footballer

Personal information
- Full name: Petar Glintić
- Date of birth: 9 June 1992 (age 34)
- Place of birth: Ivanjica, FR Yugoslavia
- Height: 1.92 m (6 ft 4 in)
- Position: Goalkeeper

Senior career*
Years	Team	Apps	(Gls)
2011–2014	Javor Ivanjica	5	(0)
2013	→ Sloga Petrovac (loan)	15	(0)
2013–2014	→ Smederevo (loan)	16	(0)
2015	Rimavská Sobota	12	(0)
2015	Sloga Požega	1	(0)
2016–2017	Javor Ivanjica	7	(0)
2018-2019	Sloga Požega		
- * Club domestic league appearances and goals as of 21 May 2016

Petar Glintić (Serbian Cyrillic: Петар Глинтић; born 9 June 1992) is a Serbian football goalkeeper who last played for Sloga Požega.
