= Petar Zivkov =

Austrian footballer (born 1995)

Personal information
- Date of birth: 26 January 1995 (age 31)
- Place of birth: Vienna, Austria
- Height: 1.80 m (5 ft 11 in)
- Position: Left-back

Youth career
- 2002–2004: SV Wienerberg
- 2004–2005: Rapid Wien
- 2005–2007: Austria Wien
- 2007–2008: SC Team Wiener
- 2008–2009: Trenkwalder Admira
- 2009: SC Team Wiener
- 2010–2011: OFK Beograd
- 2011–2012: Chievo Verona
- 2012–2013: Carpi 1909

Senior career*
Years	Team	Apps	(Gls)
2013	Civitanovese	14	(1)
2014	Fermana	12	(2)
2014	OFK Beograd	0	(0)
2014	Matelica	10	(0)
2015–2016	RapalloBogliasco	37	(9)
2016–2017	Vicenza	9	(0)
2017–2018	Padova	4	(0)
2018–2019	Reggina	6	(0)
2019	→ Rende (loan)	9	(1)
2019–2020	Casertana	11	(0)
- * Club domestic league appearances and goals as of 11 April 2020

Petar Zivkov (born 26 January 1995) is an Austrian footballer who plays as a left-back.

== Career ==
Born in Vienna, he played with SV Wienerberg, SK Rapid Wien, FK Austria Wien, SC Team Wiener and Trenkwalder Admira in Vienna during his youth career, besides OFK Beograd in Serbia as well. In 2011, he moves to Italy, and after playing in the youth teams of Chievo Verona and Carpi 1909, he debuted as senior playing with lower-league Italian clubs such as Civitanovese and Fermana. During 2014 he spent some time back in Serbia with OFK Beograd bur without debuting in the league. Then he returned to Italy, and, after a spell with Matelica, he spends a season with RapalloBogliasco. His regular performances earned him a contract with Vicenza. He made a debut in the 2016–17 Serie B on 9 October 2016, in a home game against Cesena, a 0–0 draw.

On 10 July 2018, he signed with Reggina. The contract is for one year with another one-year extension option. On 21 January 2019, he moved on loan to Rende.

On 3 July 2019, he signed with Casertana.
