= Ivan Milenković =

Serbian footballer

Personal information
- Full name: Ivan Milenković
- Date of birth: 4 July 1983 (age 43)
- Place of birth: Niš, Serbia, SFR Yugoslavia
- Height: 1.77 m (5 ft 10 in)
- Position: Midfielder

Youth career
- Radnički Niš

Senior career*
| Years | Team | Apps | (Gls) |
| 2001–2007 | Radnički Niš | 145 | (8) |
| 2007–2008 | Jagodina | 15 | (0) |
| 2008–2009 | Mladi Radnik | 5 | (0) |
| 2009–2013 | Radnički Niš | 57 | (10) |
| 2013–2014 | Sinđelić Niš | | |
| 2014–2021 | Car Konstantin | | |
- * Club domestic league appearances and goals as of 1 August 2013

Ivan Milenković (Serbian Cyrillic: Иван Миленковић; born 3 July 1983) is a Serbian retired footballer.

== Career ==
Born in Niš, he started in Radnički Niš and played 145 games for the club. In 2007, he moved to FK Jagodina but played only 15 games in two seasons. In 2008, he went to FK Mladi Radnik for a half season. In 2010, he moved to Radnički Niš and had three good seasons. In summer 2013 he moved to FK Sinđelić Niš.

== Honours ==
- Serbian First League: 2011–12
