= Uroš Košutić =

Serbian footballer

Personal information
- Full name: Uroš Košutić
- Date of birth: 11 November 1991 (age 34)
- Place of birth: Belgrade, SFR Yugoslavia
- Height: 1.87 m (6 ft 2 in)
- Position: Midfielder

Youth career
- 2000–2006: Zemun
- 2006–2010: Milutinac Zemun

Senior career*
Years	Team	Apps	(Gls)
2008–2011	Milutinac Zemun		
2011–2015	Donji Srem	37	(0)
2013	→ Zemun (loan)	8	(1)
2015–2020	Dunav Stari Banovci		
- * Club domestic league appearances and goals as of 28 May 2015

Uroš Košutić (Serbian Cyrillic: Урош Кошутић; born 11 November 1991) is a Serbian retired football midfielder.
