= Jovan Vučinić =

Montenegrin footballer

Personal information
- Full name: Jovan Vučinić
- Date of birth: 20 January 1992 (age 34)
- Place of birth: Bar, SFR Yugoslavia
- Height: 1.79 m (5 ft 10 in)
- Position: Forward

Youth career
- –2010: Partizan

Senior career*
Years	Team	Apps	(Gls)
2010–2011	Teleoptik	5	(1)
2011–2012	Smederevo	14	(0)
2012–2013	Čukarički	19	(0)
2013	Jagodina	4	(0)
2014	Mornar	14	(0)
2014–2015	Radnik Bijeljina	25	(1)
2015–2016	Mornar	28	(6)
2016	Bokelj	16	(4)
2017–2019	Petrovac	58	(6)
Total		183	(18)

International career
2009–2010	Serbia U18	7	(3)
2010–2011	Montenegro U19	9	(0)
2012–2013	Montenegro U21	3	(0)
- * Club domestic league appearances and goals as of 18 October 2020

Jovan Vučinić (Serbian Cyrillic: Јован Вучинић; born 20 January 1992) is a Montenegrin footballer who most recently played as forward for Montenegrin First League club OFK Petrovac.

== Club career ==
Born in Bar, while still young he moved to Belgrade where he joined the youth teams of FK Partizan. In summer 2010 he moved to Partizan's satellite club FK Teleoptik where he made his senior debut by playing in the Serbian First League. In June 2011 he signed a 2-year contract with top-flight side FK Smederevo.

=== Jagodina ===
On July 31, 2013, it was announced that Vučinić signed a three-year contract with FK Jagodina along with fellow countryman Đorđe Šušnjar.

== International career ==
At national team level, he has been a regular member of the Montenegro national under-19 football team during the years of 2010 and 2011.

In August 2012 he received a call from the Montenegrin U-21 team to participate in the Valeriy Lobanovsky International Tournament. Montenegro finished second in the tournament and Jovan Vučinić played in both matches involving the Montenegrin team.
