= Marko Knežević =

Serbian footballer

Personal information
- Date of birth: 29 March 1989 (age 37)
- Place of birth: Belgrade, SFR Yugoslavia
- Height: 1.86 m (6 ft 1 in)
- Position: Goalkeeper

Team information
- Current team: Zemun
- Number: 1

Youth career
- Partizan

Senior career*
Years	Team	Apps	(Gls)
2006–2008	Partizan	0	(0)
2006	→ Teleoptik (loan)	8	(0)
2007	→ Metalac Gornji Milanovac (loan)	9	(0)
2007–2008	→ Teleoptik (loan)	8	(0)
2008–2009	Kolubara	17	(0)
2009	Voždovac	11	(0)
2010	Borac Banja Luka	2	(0)
2010–2012	Banat Zrenjanin	47	(0)
2012–2013	Radnički Kragujevac	9	(0)
2013	Voždovac	0	(0)
2014–2015	Bežanija	16	(0)
2015	Javor Ivanjica	0	(0)
2016–2017	Smederevo 1924	28	(0)
2017–2019	Voždovac	15	(0)
2019–2020	Radnički Niš	1	(0)
2020	Inđija	1	(0)
2021–2022	Železničar Pančevo	30	(0)
2022–2023	Mladost Novi Sad	12	(0)
2023–2024	Dubočica	25	(0)
2024	Voždovac	8	(0)
2025	Sloboda Užice	9	(0)
2025	Kabel Novi Sad	5	(0)
2026–	Zemun	0	(0)

International career
2004–2006	Serbia and Montenegro U17 (Note: Only official UEFA matches included)	10	(0)
2006–2007	Serbia U19	4	(0)
- * Club domestic league appearances and goals as of 14 May 2026

Marko Knežević (Serbian Cyrillic: Марко Кнежевић; born 29 March 1989) is a Serbian professional footballer who plays as a goalkeeper for Zemun.

Knežević is a product of Partizan's youth system, but failed to make a single appearance for the club. He instead went on loan to Teleoptik and Metalac Gornji Milanovac.

Knežević represented Serbia and Montenegro at the 2006 UEFA Under-17 Championship.

== Honours ==
Borac Banja Luka

- Bosnia and Herzegovina Cup: 2009–10
