= Stefan Petrović (footballer, born 1990) =

Serbian footballer

Personal information
- Full name: Stefan Petrović
- Date of birth: 21 January 1990 (age 36)
- Place of birth: Kragujevac, SFR Yugoslavia
- Height: 1.80 m (5 ft 11 in)
- Positions: Defensive midfielder; right-back

Senior career*
Years	Team	Apps	(Gls)
2008–2013	Radnički Kragujevac	94	(10)
2012	→ Pobeda Beloševac (loan)	9	(1)
2014	Spartak Subotica	3	(0)
2014	Jedinstvo Užice	8	(0)
2015	Sloga Petrovac	12	(1)
2015–2016	Jagodina	0	(0)
2016–2018	Šumadija 1903		
2018	Mladi Borac Veliko Orašje		
- * Club domestic league appearances and goals as of 3 September 2015

Stefan Petrović (Serbian Cyrillic: Стефан Петровић; born 24 January 1990) is a Serbian footballer.
