= Marko Ristić (footballer, born 1987) =

Serbian footballer

Personal information
- Date of birth: 9 March 1987 (age 39)
- Place of birth: Požarevac, SFR Yugoslavia
- Height: 1.60 m (5 ft 3 in)
- Position: Left-back

Senior career*
Years	Team	Apps	(Gls)
2004–2006	Železničar Smederevo	10	(0)
2006–2009	INON Požarevac	75	(6)
2009	Mladi Radnik	0	(0)
2009–2012	Radnički 1923	59	(1)
2013–2014	Smederevo	40	(1)
2014–2015	Sloboda Užice	22	(0)
2015–2016	Slavija Sarajevo	28	(0)
2016–2017	Jagodina	37	(1)
2018	Temnić 1924	12	(0)
2018–2019	Sloboda Užice	14	(0)
2019–2022	Tabor Sežana	88	(1)
Total		385	(10)
- * Club domestic league appearances and goals as of 11 November 2019

Marko Ristić (Serbian Cyrillic: Марко Ристић; born 9 March 1987) is a Serbian retired footballer.

He left Bosnian side Slavija Sarajevo after their relegation to the second tier in summer 2016. He later played for Jagodina, Temnić 1924 and Sloboda Užice.
