= Miloš Živanović =

Serbian footballer

Personal information
- Full name: Miloš Živanović
- Date of birth: 24 July 1988 (age 38)
- Place of birth: Belgrade, SFR Yugoslavia
- Height: 1.76 m (5 ft 9 in)
- Position: Forward

Youth career
- Partizan

Senior career*
Years	Team	Apps	(Gls)
2005–2008	Partizan	0	(0)
2005–2006	→ Teleoptik (loan)	23	(1)
2006	→ Mladenovac (loan)	17	(2)
2007–2008	→ Teleoptik (loan)	29	(9)
2008–2011	Hajduk Kula	84	(17)
2011–2012	Borac Čačak	38	(3)
2013	BSK Borča	12	(1)
2013	Sloboda Užice	2	(0)
2013–2014	Jedinstvo Užice	22	(4)
2014–2015	Mačva Šabac	23	(2)
2015–2016	Mladost Velika Obarska		
2016	Inđija	7	(1)
2017	Dinamo Vranje	3	(0)
2017	Radnički Pirot	15	(0)
2018	Sloboda Užice	13	(1)
2019	Jedinstvo Surčin		
2019–2021	Leštane		
2022	BSK Borča		

International career
2004–2005	Serbia and Montenegro U17 (Note: Only official UEFA matches included)	5	(2)
2006–2007	Serbia U19	6	(2)
2009–2010	Serbia U21	2	(0)
- * Club domestic league appearances and goals as of 12 September 2019

Miloš Živanović (Serbian Cyrillic: Милош Живановић; born 24 July 1988) is a Serbian retired footballer who played as a forward.

== Club career ==
A product of the Partizan youth system, Živanović spent three seasons at Hajduk Kula between 2008 and 2011, making 84 appearances and scoring 17 goals in the Serbian SuperLiga. He later played for numerous clubs in the top flight and lower divisions.

== International career ==
At international level, Živanović represented Serbia at the 2007 UEFA European Under-19 Championship. He was also capped twice for the under-21 team from 2009 to 2010.
