= Slobodan Lalić =

Serbian footballer

Personal information
- Full name: Slobodan Lalić
- Date of birth: 18 February 1992 (age 34)
- Place of birth: Kula, FR Yugoslavia
- Height: 1.88 m (6 ft 2 in)
- Position: Defender

Team information
- Current team: VfR Garching

Senior career*
Years	Team	Apps	(Gls)
2008–2013	Hajduk Kula	46	(1)
2009–2010	→ Tekstilac Odžaci (loan)	11	(0)
2010–2011	→ Bačka Topola (loan)	15	(1)
2013	Voždovac	14	(1)
2014	Čukarički	1	(0)
2014	Ulisses	12	(0)
2015	Jezero		
2015	Drina Zvornik	8	(0)
2016	ČSK Čelarevo	8	(0)
2016–2017	Inđija	24	(0)
2017–2018	TSC	14	(0)
2019	FK Csíkszereda	14	(0)
2020–2022	Hajduk 1912	0	(0)
2022–2024	Türkischer SV Pfaffenhofen	44	(4)
2024-	VfR Garching	4	(0)

International career
2011–2012	Serbia U19	13	(0)
2013	Serbia U21	2	(0)
- * Club domestic league appearances and goals as of 1 November 2024

Slobodan Lalić (Serbian Cyrillic: Слободан Лалић; born 18 February 1992) is a Serbian footballer who plays for German amateur side VfR Garching.

== Honours ==
FK Csíkszereda

- Liga III: 2018–19
