= Stanimir Milošković =

Serbian footballer

Personal information
- Full name: Stanimir Milošković
- Date of birth: 21 December 1983 (age 42)
- Place of birth: Kragujevac, SFR Yugoslavia
- Height: 1.81 m (5 ft 11 in)
- Position: Striker

Senior career*
Years	Team	Apps	(Gls)
2002–2003	Radnički Kragujevac	30	(9)
2003–2005	Šumadija Kragujevac	62	(18)
2005–2008	Kalamata	85	(15)
2008–2009	Diagoras	43	(6)
2010	Radnički Kragujevac	14	(14)
2010–2011	Pierikos	29	(3)
2011–2013	Radnički Kragujevac	55	(9)
2013	Aiginiakos	11	(1)
2014–2015	Javor Ivanjica	34	(10)
2015	Kolubara	13	(0)
2016	Sloga Petrovac	13	(2)
2016–2017	Jagodina	26	(1)
2017	Ängelholms FF	11	(5)
2018	Nadur Youngsters	21	(11)
2018	Birkirkara	2	(0)
2018–2019	Victoria Hotspurs	23	(3)
2019–2020	Sliema Wanderers	9	(0)
2020–2024	Żebbuġ Rangers	63	(11)
- * Club domestic league appearances and goals

Stanimir Milošković (Serbian Cyrillic: Станимир Милошковић; born 21 December 1983) is a Serbian retired footballer who played as a striker.

== Career ==
Born in Kragujevac, Milošković played for his hometown clubs Radnički and Šumadija, before moving abroad to Greece and joining Beta Ethniki side Kalamata in the summer of 2005. He spent three seasons at the club, scoring 15 goals in 85 league appearances. In the summer of 2008, Milošković moved to fellow Greek side Pierikos, spending the following year and a half with them. He returned to his parent club Radnički Kragujevac in the 2010 winter transfer window, helping the side win promotion to the Serbian First League. Subsequently, Milošković went back to Greece and spent a season with Pierikos.

In July 2011, Milošković signed with newly promoted Serbian SuperLiga side Radnički Kragujevac. He spent the next two seasons there, making 55 appearances and scoring nine goals in the top flight.

In 2017, Milošković played for Ängelholms FF in the Swedish Division 1.

In 2018, Milošković moved to Malta and played for Gozo Football League First Division club Nadur Youngsters.

In 2018–19, Milošković played for Gozo Football League First Division club Victoria Hotspurs, then joined Sliema Wanderers.

== Honours ==
Radnički Kragujevac

- Serbian League West: 2009–10
