= Mladen Veselinović (Serbian footballer) =

Serbian footballer

Personal information
- Date of birth: 22 May 1992 (age 34)
- Place of birth: Knin, Croatia
- Height: 1.80 m (5 ft 11 in)
- Position: Left-back

Team information
- Current team: OFK Bačka
- Number: 19

Senior career*
Years	Team	Apps	(Gls)
2010–2013	Hajduk Kula	17	(0)
2010	→ Mladost Apatin (loan)	12	(0)
2011	→ Tekstilac Odžaci (loan)	7	(0)
2011–2012	→ Bačka Topola (loan)	33	(0)
2013	Napredak Kruševac	8	(0)
2014	Donji Srem	4	(0)
2014–2016	Sloga Petrovac	37	(1)
2016	OFK Bačka	0	(0)
2017	OFK Odžaci	12	(0)
2018–2019	Hajduk 1912		
2019–2020	OFK Bačka	22	(0)
2021–2022	Budućnost Dobanovci	44	(0)
2022-2023	Tekstilac Odžaci		
2023-	Bačka Palanka		
- * Club domestic league appearances and goals as of 6 October 2022

Mladen Veselinović (Serbian Cyrillic: Младен Веселиновић; born 22 May 1992) is a Serbian football defender who plays for OFK Bačka.

== Club career ==
He has been a player of FK Hajduk Kula from 2010 to 2013, but he was loaned out to lower ranked clubs at the beginning of his career. He didn't get a real chance until 2012. After the dissolution of the Hajduk in summer 2013, he joined the FK Napredak Kruševac together with his teammate Miloš Cvetković.

During the winter break of the 2013–14 season, he left Napredak and joined another SuperLiga club, FK Donji Srem.
