= List of Serbian football transfers summer 2011 =

This is a list of transfers in Serbian football for the 2011 summer transfer window. Only moves featuring a Serbian SuperLiga side are listed. The order by which the clubs are listed is equal to the classification of the SuperLiga at the end of the previous season, 2010–11.

The transfer window in Serbia opened on June 20, 2011.

== Serbian SuperLiga ==
=== Partizan Belgrade ===
In: Note: Flags indicate national team as defined under FIFA eligibility rules; some limited exceptions apply. Players may hold more than one non-FIFA nationality.

No.	Pos.	Nation	Player
3	DF	SRB	Vladimir Volkov (from (Moldova) Sheriff Tiraspol)
20	MF	SRB	Dejan Babić (from BSK Borča)
19	FW	BIH	Vladimir Jovančić (from FK Rad)
26	FW	SEN	Lamine Diarra (loan return from (United Arab Emirates) Al Shabab)
21	MF	SRB	Saša Marković (from OFK Beograd)
15	DF	BUL	Ivan Ivanov (from (Russia) Alania Vladikavkaz)
9	FW	BRA	Eduardo (from (Brazil) São Caetano)
5	MF	SRB	Aleksandar Ranković (from (Netherlands) ADO Den Haag)
13	DF	SRB	Nikola Aksentijević (from FK Teleoptik)
11	MF	SRB	Nikola Ninković (from FK Partizan U19)
50	FW	SRB	Lazar Marković (from FK Partizan U19)
30	GK	SRB	Nikola Petrović (from FK Teleoptik)
44	DF	BRA	Anderson Marques (from (Brazil) São Caetano)
24	DF	SRB	Nemanja Rnić (from (Belgium) Anderlecht, was on loan at (Belgium) Germinal Beerschot)
17	MF	CTA	David Manga (from (Germany) TSV 1860 München II)
99	MF	SRB	Milan Smiljanić (free, last with (Spain) RCD Espanyol)

Out: Note: Flags indicate national team as defined under FIFA eligibility rules; some limited exceptions apply. Players may hold more than one non-FIFA nationality.

No.	Pos.	Nation	Player
20	DF	SRB	Mladen Krstajić (retired, became sports director)
28	FW	GHA	Prince Tagoe (loan return to (Germany) TSG Hoffenheim)
40	FW	GHA	Dominic Adiyiah (loan return to (Italy) AC Milan)
3	DF	SRB	Ivan Stevanović (loan return to (France) Sochaux)
77	FW	SRB	Ivica Iliev (to (Poland) Wisla Krakow)
—	MF	SRB	Saša Ivković (on loan to FK Teleoptik, previously bought from ČSK Čelarevo)
—	FW	BRA	Washington (released, after loan return from Borac Čačak)
5	MF	SRB	Ljubomir Fejsa (to (Greece) Olympiacos)
13	DF	SRB	Marko Jovanović (to (Poland) Wisla Krakow)
—	DF	SRB	Matija Nastasić (to (Italy) AC Fiorentina)
12	GK	SRB	Živko Živković (on loan to FK Metalac G.M.)
15	DF	MNE	Stefan Savić (to (England) Manchester City)
19	FW	SRB	Miloš Bogunović (to FK Novi Pazar)
8	MF	SRB	Radosav Petrović (to (England) Blackburn Rovers)
14	MF	SRB	Darko Brašanac (on loan to FK Smederevo)
—	MF	SRB	Saša Jovanović (to FK Rad, was on loan with FK Teleoptik)
23	MF	SRB	Aleksandar Davidov (on loan to (Israel) Hapoel Acre)
27	DF	UGA	Joseph Kizito (released)

=== Red Star Belgrade ===
In: Note: Flags indicate national team as defined under FIFA eligibility rules; some limited exceptions apply. Players may hold more than one non-FIFA nationality.

No.	Pos.	Nation	Player
6	DF	SRB	Nikola Ignjatijević (loan return from (Romania) Politehnica Timișoara)
2	MF	BRA	Sávio (loan return from (China) Changchun Yatai)
5	DF	SRB	Uroš Ćosić (loan extension from (Russia) PFC CSKA Moscow)
7	MF	SRB	Miloš Dimitrijević (from FK Rad, was on loan at (Italy) Chievo Verona)
11	MF	BRA	Vinícius Pacheco (from (Brazil) Flamengo, was on loan at (Brazil) Grêmio)
9	FW	BRA	Bruno Mezenga (on loan from (Brazil) Flamengo, was on loan at (Poland) Legia Warszawa)
32	GK	SRB	Aleksandar Kirovski (from FK Zemun)
22	GK	SRB	Miloš Vesić (from FK Novi Sad)
33	MF	SRB	Nenad Kovačević (from (France) RC Lens)
55	DF	SRB	Nikola Petković (from (Germany) Eintracht Frankfurt)

Out: Note: Flags indicate national team as defined under FIFA eligibility rules; some limited exceptions apply. Players may hold more than one non-FIFA nationality.

No.	Pos.	Nation	Player
9	MF	SRB	Ognjen Koroman (to (Russia) Krylia Sovetov Samara)
88	MF	SRB	Dejan Milovanović (loan return to (France) RC Lens)
22	GK	SRB	Saša Stamenković (to (Azerbaijan) Neftchi Baku)
24	DF	SRB	Pavle Ninkov (to (France) Toulouse)
—	MF	SRB	Andrej Mrkela (was on loan, now signed with FK Rad)
—	MF	MNE	Nemanja Nikolić (to OFK Beograd, was on loan at Spartak ZV Subotica)
21	FW	SRB	Aleksandar Jevtić (to (China) Jiangsu Sainty)
26	MF	GHA	Mohammed-Awal Issah (to (Norway) Rosenborg)
23	FW	SRB	Slavko Perović (to FK Rad)
—	MF	MNE	Marko Mugoša (to FK Novi Pazar, was on loan at FK Jagodina)
17	MF	SRB	Vladan Binić (on loan to Radnički 1923)
—	MF	SRB	Nenad Srećković (to (Netherlands) De Graafschap, was on loan at Napredak Kruševac)
3	DF	SRB	Duško Tošić (on loan to (Spain) Real Betis)
—	DF	SRB	Bojan Đorđević (on loan to Napredak Kruševac, was on loan at FK Novi Pazar)
—	MF	SRB	Marko Nikolić (on loan to Napredak Kruševac, was on loan at FK Sopot)
—	FW	MNE	Stefan Denković (to (Israel) Hapoel Haifa, was on loan at FK Sopot)
—	FW	SRB	Miloš Reljić (to (Bulgaria) Lokomotiv Plovdiv, was on loan at BSK Borča)

=== FK Vojvodina ===
In: Note: Flags indicate national team as defined under FIFA eligibility rules; some limited exceptions apply. Players may hold more than one non-FIFA nationality.

No.	Pos.	Nation	Player
26	DF	SRB	Vladimir Kovačević (loan return from Hajduk Kula)
27	GK	BIH	Nemanja Supić (from FK Javor)
3	DF	SRB	Vladimir Branković (from (Moldova) Sheriff Tiraspol)
1	GK	SRB	Budimir Janošević (from FK Jagodina)
23	DF	GHA	Abraham Frimpong (from (Italy) Vicenza Primavera)
10	FW	SRB	Milan Bojović (from FK Jagodina)
20	MF	SRB	Marko Ljubinković (from (Cyprus) Anorthosis Famagusta)
7	FW	SRB	Petar Škuletić (from (Austria) LASK Linz, previously on loan at (Montenegro) FK Zeta)

Out: Note: Flags indicate national team as defined under FIFA eligibility rules; some limited exceptions apply. Players may hold more than one non-FIFA nationality.

No.	Pos.	Nation	Player
—	GK	SRB	Darko Ristić (to RFK Novi Sad, was on loan at Cement Beočin)
12	GK	SRB	Aleksandar Kesić (to FK Rad)
—	DF	SRB	Danijel Faber (loan extension to FK Veternik)
8	MF	MNE	Janko Tumbasević (to (Moldova) Dacia Chişinău)
1	GK	SRB	Željko Brkić (to (Italy) Udinese, then loaned to (Italy) Siena)
27	FW	SRB	Aleksandar Katai (to (Greece) Olympiacos)
—	MF	SRB	Marko Stančetić (to Spartak ZV Subotica, was on loan at Cement Beočin)
23	DF	SRB	Dušan Nestorović (on loan to (Montenegro) Rudar Pljevlja)
32	GK	SRB	Filip Pajović (to (Hungary) Videoton FC)
—	MF	SRB	Srđan Bečelić (loan extension to FK Veternik)
—	GK	SRB	Dragan Vojvodić (on loan to Sloga Temerin)
—	DF	SRB	Milorad Kosić (on loan to Sloga Temerin)
25	FW	SRB	Vladimir Silađi (on loan to Proleter Novi Sad)
—	FW	SRB	Aleksandar Jovanović (on loan to FK Veternik)
—	DF	SRB	Dejan Vukaljević (on loan to FK Veternik)
—	MF	MKD	Filip Naumčevski (to OFK Mladenovac)
—	DF	SRB	Aleksandar Tanasin (on loan to Proleter Novi Sad, was on loan at Cement Beočin)
19	FW	SRB	Ognjen Mudrinski (to FK Jagodina, was on loan at RFK Novi Sad)
—	FW	SRB	Đorđe Šušnjar (loan extension to Donji Srem Pećinci)
15	DF	MNE	Stefan Zogović (on loan to (Montenegro) Sutjeska Nikšić, was on loan at FK Novi Sad)
—	DF	AUS	Aleksandar Jovanović (to Hajduk Kula, was on loan at RFK Novi Sad)
—	DF	SRB	Milovan Milović (on loan to FK Javor)
11	MF	SRB	Nikola Lazetić (released)
—	MF	SRB	Damir Zeljko (on loan to Donji Srem Pećinci)
—	GK	SRB	Damir Drinić (to Mladost Bački Jarak)
7	FW	SRB	Nemanja Čović (to Spartak ZV Subotica)
—	GK	SRB	Nikola Perić (to Hajduk Kula)
15	DF	MNE	Milko Novaković (to (Montenegro) OFK Grbalj, was on loan with Metalac G. M.)
—	DF	SRB	Ivan Mejić (on loan to FK Kikinda)
—	DF	SRB	Nemanja Radoja (on loan to ČSK Čelarevo)
—	MF	SRB	Marko Poletanović (on loan to Cement Beočin)

=== Rad Beograd ===
In: Note: Flags indicate national team as defined under FIFA eligibility rules; some limited exceptions apply. Players may hold more than one non-FIFA nationality.

No.	Pos.	Nation	Player
9	DF	MNE	Srđan Ajković (loan return from (Montenegro) FK Lovćen)
23	FW	SRB	Dario Božičić (from FK Bežanija)
12	GK	SRB	Aleksandar Kesić (from FK Vojvodina)
13	DF	FRA	Banfa Sylla (from (Spain) Lorca Atlético)
26	GK	SRB	Aleksandar Marinković (from FK Zemun)
3	DF	SRB	Radomir Koković (loan return from (China) Changchun Yatai)
14	DF	SRB	Predrag Ocokoljić (from (Cyprus) Ethnikos Achna)
10	FW	SRB	Slavko Perović (from Red Star Belgrade)
—	DF	SRB	Nikola Antić (from Partizan Belgrade U19)
—	DF	SRB	Dušan Plavšić (from BSK Borča)
—	MF	SRB	Milan Jagodić (from Sloga Bajina Bašta)
18	MF	GHA	Ferdinand Opoku (from (Ghana) Golden Boot)

Out: Note: Flags indicate national team as defined under FIFA eligibility rules; some limited exceptions apply. Players may hold more than one non-FIFA nationality.

No.	Pos.	Nation	Player
4	DF	MKD	Aleksandar Todorovski (to (Poland) Polonia Warszawa)
23	FW	BIH	Vladimir Jovančić (to Partizan Belgrade)
—	MF	SRB	Miloš Dimitrijević (to Red Star Belgrade, was loan at (Italy) Chievo Verona)
26	GK	CAN	Milan Borjan (to (Turkey) Sivasspor)
12	GK	SRB	Nenad Filipović (to FK Teleoptik)
10	MF	MNE	Uroš Delić (to (Belgium) Beerschot AC)
—	FW	BIH	Miloš Galin (to (Bosnia and Herzegovina) Jedinstvo Bihać, was on loan at (Bosnia and Herzegovina) Drina Zvornik)
—	MF	MKD	Žan Manovski (on loan to FK Srem S.M.)
—	FW	SRB	Nemanja Obradović (on loan to FK Srem S.M.)
—	DF	SRB	Miloš Cvetković (on loan to FK Palić, brought from FK Zemun)
—	MF	SRB	Saša Jovanović (on loan to FK Palić, brought from FK Partizan which had him loaned to FK Teleoptik)

=== Spartak ZV Subotica ===
In: Note: Flags indicate national team as defined under FIFA eligibility rules; some limited exceptions apply. Players may hold more than one non-FIFA nationality.

No.	Pos.	Nation	Player
10	FW	SRB	Đorđe Despotović (on loan from Red Star Belgrade)
14	MF	SRB	Marko Stančetić (from FK Vojvodina, was on loan at Cement Beočin)
—	DF	SRB	Daniel Farkaš (from FK Senta)
18	FW	SRB	Miljan Milivojev (from FK Senta)
1	GK	SRB	Nikola Stijaković (from BSK Borča)
25	GK	SRB	Nikola Mirković (from Mladi Radnik)
22	DF	SRB	Vladimir Otašević (from Metalac G.M.)
3	DF	SRB	Milan Joksimović (from FK Inđija)
19	FW	MKD	Fahrudin Gjurgjević (from (North Macedonia) FK Vardar)
15	MF	SRB	Dino Šarac (from Srem S.M.)
16	DF	SRB	Borko Novaković (from FK Inđija)
9	FW	SRB	Nemanja Čović (from FK Vojvodina)
13	MF	USA	Danny Barrera (from (United States) Ventura County Fusion)
32	GK	SRB	Nikola Kovačević (free, last with (Austria) Rapid Wien II)

Out: Note: Flags indicate national team as defined under FIFA eligibility rules; some limited exceptions apply. Players may hold more than one non-FIFA nationality.

No.	Pos.	Nation	Player
3	DF	SRB	Dragan Šarac (to FK Novi Pazar)
1	GK	SRB	Nemanja Jorgić (to Proleter Novi Sad)
13	MF	SRB	Vladimir Veselinov (to FK Mladi Radnik)
18	DF	SRB	Nemanja Crnoglavac (to FK Teleoptik)
23	DF	SRB	Lazar Veselinović (to FK Mladi Radnik)
16	MF	CHN	Cheng Mouyi (released)
25	GK	SRB	Goran Labus (loan extension to (Bosnia and Herzegovina) Zvijezda Gradačac)
19	DF	SRB	Miloš Bokić (on loan to Mladost Lučani)
26	MF	MNE	Darko Karadžić (to (Montenegro) Sutjeska Nikšić)
14	MF	BIH	Miroslav Čovilo (on loan to Hajduk Kula)
10	MF	SRB	Aleksandar Avrić (on loan to Hajduk Kula)
—	FW	SRB	Nenad Puhalak (to (Hungary) Lombard-Pápa TFC, was on loan at Bačka 1901)
15	MF	MNE	Nemanja Nikolić (loan return to Red Star Belgrade, next to OFK Beograd)
9	FW	SRB	Srđan Vujaklija (to Hajduk Kula)
22	MF	BIH	Igor Mišan (on loan to RFK Novi Sad)

=== Sloboda Sevojno ===
In: Note: Flags indicate national team as defined under FIFA eligibility rules; some limited exceptions apply. Players may hold more than one non-FIFA nationality.

No.	Pos.	Nation	Player
5	DF	BIH	Jovan Vujanić (from (Bosnia and Herzegovina) FK Modriča)
11	FW	SRB	Marko Memedović (from Sloga Kraljevo)
21	MF	SRB	Nebojša Prtenjak (from Borac Čačak)
9	FW	MNE	Filip Kasalica (from Hajduk Kula)
7	DF	BIH	Slavko Marić (from Borac Čačak)
8	MF	SRB	Vojislav Vranjković (from (Romania) Dinamo București, was on loan at (Romania) Pandurii Târgu Jiu)
15	DF	SRB	Aleksandar Gojković (from Sloga Kraljevo)
44	DF	LBR	Omega Roberts (from (Mali) Cercle Bamako)
2	DF	SRB	Jovica Vasilić (loan extension from Sloga Kraljevo)
20	FW	BRA	Thiago Galvão (was on loan, now signed from (Brazil) Paulista FC)
55	DF	SRB	Slavko Ćulibrk (from Banat Zrenjanin)
16	MF	SRB	Stojan Pilipović (from Banat Zrenjanin)
18	MF	MNE	Vuk Đurić (from Hajduk Kula)

Out: Note: Flags indicate national team as defined under FIFA eligibility rules; some limited exceptions apply. Players may hold more than one non-FIFA nationality.

No.	Pos.	Nation	Player
—	MF	SRB	Vladimir Vukajlović (to (Greece) Diagoras Rodos)
4	DF	SRB	Radoš Bulatović (to (Hungary) Zalaegerszeg)
18	MF	SRB	Predrag Lazić (to (Cyprus) Aris Limassol)
44	DF	SVK	Maroš Klimpl (to (Cyprus) Aris Limassol)
5	DF	SRB	Dragan Radosavljević (to (Cyprus) Aris Limassol)
7	MF	SRB	Radan Šunjevarić (to FK Novi Pazar)
23	FW	SRB	Edin Ademović (to FK Novi Pazar)
22	FW	SRB	Vladimir Vujović (to FK Jagodina)
1	GK	SRB	Milorad Nikolić (to Javor Ivanjica)
33	MF	CZE	Tomáš Poláček (to (Czech Republic) FK Chmel Blšany)
19	MF	BRA	Ricardinho (loan return to (Brazil) Corinthians B)
55	DF	SRB	Aleksandar Petrović (to FK Novi Pazar)
9	FW	SRB	Marko Pavićević (to (Cyprus) Ethnikos Achna)
11	DF	SRB	Igor Stanisavljević (to FK Beograd)
15	MF	SRB	Dušan Mihailović (released)

=== OFK Beograd ===
In: Note: Flags indicate national team as defined under FIFA eligibility rules; some limited exceptions apply. Players may hold more than one non-FIFA nationality.

No.	Pos.	Nation	Player
24	MF	SRB	Miloš Mijić (from Radnički Nova Pazova)
4	DF	SRB	Danijel Gašić (from Napredak Kruševac)
21	MF	SRB	Ivan Petrović (from (Cyprus) Ethnikos Achnas)
22	MF	BIH	Amer Osmanagić (loan return from (Poland) Zaglebie Lubin)
77	MF	SRB	Igor Stanojević (from PKB Padinska Skela)
17	MF	SRB	Predrag Pavlović (from FK Metalac G.M.)
20	FW	MNE	Milan Purović (from (Portugal) Sporting CP, was on loan at (Belgium) Cercle Brugge)
25	GK	SRB	Milan Lukač (from (Greece) AEK Athens)
—	GK	MNE	Andrija Dragojević (loan return from Dinamo Vranje)
42	MF	SRB	Uroš Sinđić (from (Greece) Panserraikos FC)
19	MF	MNE	Nemanja Nikolić (from Red Star Belgrade)
37	MF	SRB	Aleksandar Simić (from (Greece) AEL)

Out: Note: Flags indicate national team as defined under FIFA eligibility rules; some limited exceptions apply. Players may hold more than one non-FIFA nationality.

No.	Pos.	Nation	Player
21	MF	SRB	Saša Marković (to Partizan Belgrade)
1	GK	SRB	Bojan Šaranov (to (Israel) Maccabi Haifa)
41	FW	SRB	Luka Milunović (to (Belgium) Zulte Waregem)
11	DF	SRB	Danilo Nikolić (to (Turkey) Karabükspor)
22	MF	SRB	Nikola Simić (to (Israel) Hapoel Acre)
36	MF	SRB	Jovan Radivojević (to Borac Čačak)
—	DF	SRB	Nenad Lazarevski (to RFK Novi Sad, was on loan at Radnički Sombor)
10	MF	SRB	Veseljko Trivunović (to (Azerbaijan) Gabala FC)
—	DF	SRB	Dušan Stanković (on loan to FK Bačka Topola, was on loan at FK Vlasina)
—	FW	SRB	Miloš Stanković (on loan to FK Bačka Topola, was on loan at FK Vlasina)
—	MF	SRB	Aleksandar Ignjovski (to (Germany) Werder Bremen, was on loan at (Germany) TSV 1860 München)
9	FW	SRB	Nenad Injac (to (Saudi Arabia) Al-Ansar)

=== Javor Ivanjica ===
In: Note: Flags indicate national team as defined under FIFA eligibility rules; some limited exceptions apply. Players may hold more than one non-FIFA nationality.

No.	Pos.	Nation	Player
1	GK	SRB	Milorad Nikolić (from Sloboda Sevojno)
6	DF	SRB	Dragan Stević (from Hajduk Kula)
14	MF	SRB	Branislav Čonka (from Radnički Nova Pazova)
24	DF	SRB	Radoslav Vlašić (from Sloga Kraljevo)
25	FW	SRB	Živorad Mišić (from Sloga Petrovac)
32	FW	SRB	Rade Veljović (from (Romania) CFR Cluj, was on loan at (Bosnia and Herzegovina) Borac Banja Luka)
20	DF	SRB	Milovan Milović (on loan from FK Vojvodina, was on loan at (Albania) Dinamo Tirana)
18	FW	NGA	Obiora Odita (from (China) Tianjin Teda)
15	MF	SRB	Fuad Salihović (free, last with FK Novi Pazar)
26	MF	SRB	Nemanja Vidić (from (Slovenia) ND Gorica)
13	MF	SRB	Dušan Sovilj (from Dinamo Vranje)
9	DF	MKD	Nikola Jakimovski (from (Hungary) Ferencváros)

Out: Note: Flags indicate national team as defined under FIFA eligibility rules; some limited exceptions apply. Players may hold more than one non-FIFA nationality.

No.	Pos.	Nation	Player
13	DF	BIH	Goran Dragović (to (North Macedonia) Metalurg Skopje)
27	GK	BIH	Nemanja Supić (to FK Vojvodina)
14	FW	SRB	Sead Hadžibulić (to Hajduk Kula)
24	FW	MKD	Filip Petrov (to (North Macedonia) FK Vardar)
15	MF	SRB	Igor Stojaković (to (North Macedonia) FK Vardar)
18	MF	SRB	Miloš Milivojević (to Radnički Sombor)
20	FW	SUI	Stefan Todorovic (released)
9	FW	SRB	Marko Stevanović (was on loan, now signed and sent on loan to Rudar Kostolac)
15	DF	SRB	Nikola Jovanović (on loan to Rudar Kostolac)

=== Borac Čačak ===
In: Note: Flags indicate national team as defined under FIFA eligibility rules; some limited exceptions apply. Players may hold more than one non-FIFA nationality.

No.	Pos.	Nation	Player
15	MF	SRB	Dušan Stojkov (from Radnik Surdulica)
14	MF	SRB	Bojan Čukić (from Banat Zrenjanin)
7	MF	SRB	Jovan Radivojević (from OFK Beograd)
11	FW	SRB	Miloš Živanović (from Hajduk Kula)
12	GK	MNE	Blažo Bakrač (from OFK Beograd youth squad)
24	MF	SRB	Vasilije Prodanović (from FK Novi Pazar)
18	FW	UGA	Eugene Sseppuya (from (Romania) Petrolul Ploieşti)
21	MF	SRB	Ivan Jovanović (from (Cyprus) AEP Paphos)

Out: Note: Flags indicate national team as defined under FIFA eligibility rules; some limited exceptions apply. Players may hold more than one non-FIFA nationality.

No.	Pos.	Nation	Player
9	FW	BRA	Washington (loan return to Partizan Belgrade)
18	DF	SRB	Radenko Kamberović (loan return to Partizan Belgrade)
11	MF	SRB	Zoran Kostić (to (Kazakhstan) FC Aktobe)
7	MF	SRB	Aleksandar Stoimirović (to (Romania) Petrolul Ploieşti)
14	MF	BIH	Slavko Marić (to Sloboda Sevojno)
21	MF	SRB	Nebojša Prtenjak (to Sloboda Sevojno)
31	MF	SRB	Dušan Petronijević (to (Kazakhstan) Shakhter Karagandy)
15	MF	SRB	Semir Sadović (on loan to FK Mladi Radnik)
—	MF	SRB	Nebojša Gavrić (released, after loan return from (Bosnia and Herzegovina) Rudar Ugljevik)
1	GK	SRB	Filip Pjevac (on loan to Polet Ljubić)
16	GK	SRB	Igor Dimitrijević
3	DF	SRB	Nikola Boranijašević (on loan to Polet Ljubić)
29	GK	SRB	Nikola Obrenić

=== FK Smederevo ===
In: Note: Flags indicate national team as defined under FIFA eligibility rules; some limited exceptions apply. Players may hold more than one non-FIFA nationality.

No.	Pos.	Nation	Player
19	MF	MNE	Dejan Boljević (on loan from FK Teleoptik)
10	FW	SRB	Nikola Trujić (on loan from FK Teleoptik)
6	DF	SRB	Saša Blagojević (from FK Teleoptik, was on loan with (Bosnia and Herzegovina) Sloga Doboj)
8	MF	SRB	Nenad Adamović (from FK Metalac G.M.)
26	FW	MNE	Jovan Vučinić (from FK Teleoptik)
9	MF	SRB	Darko Brašanac (on loan from Partizan Belgrade)
33	MF	SRB	Nikola Krčmarević (from Čukarički Stankom)

Out: Note: Flags indicate national team as defined under FIFA eligibility rules; some limited exceptions apply. Players may hold more than one non-FIFA nationality.

No.	Pos.	Nation	Player
19	MF	SRB	Branislav Atanacković (to (Moldova) Dacia Chişinău)
6	DF	SRB	Miloš Karišik (on loan to (Czech Republic) Slovan Liberec)
32	FW	SRB	Igor Grkajac (on loan to FK Kolubara)
5	DF	SRB	Slavko Lukić (to (Sweden) Limhamn Bunkeflo)
30	FW	SRB	Nikola Lekić (on loan to FK Mladi Radnik)
4	DF	MNE	Dejan Ognjanović (on loan to (Albania) KS Kastrioti)
—	DF	SRB	Bojan Živanović (on loan to OFK Mladenovac)
—	MF	SRB	Nenad Stanić (loan extension to Rudar Kostolac)
—	MF	SRB	Nemanja Stojanović (loan extension to Rudar Kostolac)
8	MF	SRB	Miloš Radosavljević (to (Czech Republic) Viktoria Žižkov)

=== BSK Borča ===
In: Note: Flags indicate national team as defined under FIFA eligibility rules; some limited exceptions apply. Players may hold more than one non-FIFA nationality.

No.	Pos.	Nation	Player
2	DF	MNE	Nikola Čelebić (from (Montenegro) OFK Petrovac)
17	FW	MNE	Igor Lambulić (from (Montenegro) FK Zeta)
19	DF	MNE	Aleksandar Radović (from (Albania) KF Elbasani)
8	MF	BIH	Dejan Vukomanović (from Palilulac Beograd)
9	FW	SRB	Nenad Živković (from FK Srem S.M.)
10	MF	SRB	Jovan Vasić (loan return from FK Lepušnica Gl. Rit)
18	MF	SRB	Blažo Bulatović (from Čukarički Stankom)
27	DF	SRB	Zvonimir Stanković (from (North Macedonia) FK Rabotnički)
34	FW	SRB	Vladimir Buač (from (France) Nîmes)
12	FW	SRB	Aleksandar Đukić (from Hajduk Kula)
31	DF	SRB	Miloš Stojičić (from (Iran) Sanati Kaveh Tehran)

Out: Note: Flags indicate national team as defined under FIFA eligibility rules; some limited exceptions apply. Players may hold more than one non-FIFA nationality.

No.	Pos.	Nation	Player
20	MF	SRB	Dejan Babić (to Partizan Belgrade)
8	FW	SRB	Miloš Reljić (loan return to Red Star Belgrade)
9	FW	SRB	Enver Alivodić (to (Cyprus) Enosis Neon Paralimni)
30	GK	SRB	Nikola Stijaković (to Spartak ZV Subotica)
19	FW	MNE	Bojan Grdinić (to (Montenegro) FK Berane)
4	DF	SRB	Dragan Žarković (to (Iran) Shahrdari Tabriz)
2	DF	SRB	Dušan Plavšić (to Rad Beograd)
7	MF	BIH	Nebojša Pejić (to (Bosnia and Herzegovina) Sloga Doboj)
—	FW	SRB	Amir Memišević (to Radnički Sombor, was on loan at FK Bačka Topola)
26	FW	SRB	Aleksandar Vijoglavin (on loan to Balkan Mirijevo)
3	DF	BIH	Nikola Vasiljević (to Srem S. Mitrovica)

=== FK Jagodina ===
In: Note: Flags indicate national team as defined under FIFA eligibility rules; some limited exceptions apply. Players may hold more than one non-FIFA nationality.

No.	Pos.	Nation	Player
8	MF	SRB	Miroljub Kostić (from Sinđelić Niš)
25	FW	SRB	Vladimir Milenković (from (Poland) Polonia Bytom)
7	FW	SRB	Vladimir Vujović (from Sloboda Sevojno)
30	MF	SRB	Stefan Vukmirović (from BASK)
9	FW	SRB	Ognjen Mudrinski (from FK Vojvodina)
28	MF	SRB	Nikola Kovačević (from Mačva Šabac)
19	DF	SRB	Aleksandar Živanović (from Hajduk Kula)
22	DF	SRB	Marko Lukić (on loan from (Spain) SD Huesca)
—	FW	SRB	Stevan Račić (from (Indonesia) Solo FC)
77	MF	SRB	Filip Arsenijević (from (Greece) Panthrakikos)
—	FW	LBY	Mohamed El Mounir (from (Libya) Al-Ittihad)
25	DF	SRB	Goran Gogić (free, last with FK Javor)
32	MF	SRB	Nikola Miletić (from BASK)

Out: Note: Flags indicate national team as defined under FIFA eligibility rules; some limited exceptions apply. Players may hold more than one non-FIFA nationality.

No.	Pos.	Nation	Player
9	FW	SRB	Perica Ognjenović (released)
22	MF	SRB	Ivan Jovanović (to FK Mladi radnik)
28	GK	SRB	Mateo Radovanović (to (Croatia) NK Novalja)
25	DF	SRB	Ivan Dragićević (to Napredak Kruševac)
2	DF	SRB	Luka Čančarević (to (Sweden) Limhamn Bunkeflo)
19	FW	SRB	Vladimir Đilas (to (Kazakhstan) FC Aktobe)
1	GK	SRB	Budimir Janošević (to FK Vojvodina)
7	MF	SRB	Irfan Vusljanin (to FK Novi Pazar)
17	MF	SRB	Bojan Beljić (to (Iran) Shahrdari Tabriz)
10	FW	SRB	Milan Bojović (to Vojvodina)
18	MF	SRB	Srđan Novković (to Hajduk Kula)
16	FW	NGA	Victor Agbo (released)
—	FW	SRB	Bojan Živković (to Metalac G.M., was on loan at Mladost Lučani)
—	MF	SRB	Miloš Živković (released, was on loan at FK Mladi Radnik)
—	DF	SRB	Dušan Golubović (released, was on loan at Morava V. Plana)
—	FW	SRB	Nenad Simić (to FK Voždovac, was on loan at Šumadija Aranđelovac)
—	MF	SRB	Ivan Simić (released, was on loan at Radnički Svilajnac)
—	FW	SRB	Predrag Dželatović (on loan to FK Trgovački, brought from Morava Ćuprija)
—	MF	SRB	Nedeljko Đurić (on loan to FK Trgovački, was on loan at Sloga Petrovac)
27	MF	MNE	Marko Mugoša (loan return to Red Star Belgrade, next to FK Novi Pazar)
14	MF	SRB	Predrag Đorđević (on loan to Sinđelić Niš)

=== Hajduk Kula ===
In: Note: Flags indicate national team as defined under FIFA eligibility rules; some limited exceptions apply. Players may hold more than one non-FIFA nationality.

No.	Pos.	Nation	Player
14	MF	SRB	Dejan Kekezović (loan return from Radnički Bajmok)
4	MF	MNE	Jovan Nikolić (from (Montenegro) Sutjeska Nikšić)
28	MF	SRB	Kenan Ragipović (from (Albania) KS Kastrioti)
8	FW	SRB	Sead Hadžibulić (from FK Javor)
7	FW	SRB	Milan Bubalo (from FK Inđija)
32	MF	SRB	Aleksandar Avrić (from Spartak ZV Subotica)
10	FW	SRB	Rodoljub Paunović (from BASK)
33	MF	BIH	Miroslav Čovilo (on loan from Spartak ZV Subotica)
18	MF	SRB	Srđan Novković (from FK Jagodina)
5	DF	SRB	Ahmed Mujdragić (from (Albania) Shkumbini Peqin)
23	DF	SRB	Miroslav Gegić (from (Switzerland) FC Naters)
12	GK	SRB	Dejan Kronić (from FK Bačka Topola)
20	MF	GHA	Quincy Osei (free, last with (Finland) FC Haka)
12	GK	SRB	Nikola Perić (from FK Vojvodina, was on loan at Mačva Šabac)
6	DF	AUS	Aleksandar Jovanović (from FK Vojvodina, was on loan at RFK Novi Sad)
21	FW	SRB	Nenad Panić (free, last with FK Javor)
9	FW	SRB	Srđan Vujaklija (from Spartak ZV Subotica)

Out: Note: Flags indicate national team as defined under FIFA eligibility rules; some limited exceptions apply. Players may hold more than one non-FIFA nationality.

No.	Pos.	Nation	Player
21	DF	SRB	Vladimir Kovačević (loan return to FK Vojvodina)
7	MF	BIH	Aleksandar Jovanović (to (Hungary) Ferencváros)
11	FW	SRB	Nikola Komazec (to (Romania) Petrolul Ploieşti)
8	MF	SRB	Nikola Bogić (to (Montenegro) FK Mogren)
28	FW	SRB	Miloš Živanović (to Borac Čačak)
17	FW	MNE	Filip Kasalica (to Sloboda Sevojno)
13	MF	SRB	Aleksandar Petrović (released)
6	DF	SRB	Petar Mudreša (to (Hungary) Kaposvári RFC)
2	DF	SRB	Dragan Stević (to FK Javor)
—	MF	MNE	Blažo Lalević (was on loan, now signed with FK Timok Zaječar)
—	DF	SRB	Damir Topčagić (to Tekstilac Ites, was on loan at Solunac Rastina)
—	DF	SRB	Goran Habenšus (to (North Macedonia) Bregalnica Štip, was on loan at FK Senta)
—	MF	MNE	Igor Kostić (to (Montenegro) Sutjeska Nikšić)
4	MF	MNE	Vuk Đurić (to Sloboda Sevojno)
5	DF	SRB	Aleksandar Živanović (to FK Jagodina)
14	FW	SRB	Aleksandar Đukić (to BSK Borča)
27	MF	CRO	Miloš Mišić (to (Croatia) NK Vukovar '91)
25	GK	SRB	Bojan Vojisavljević (released)
10	MF	SRB	Dejan Perić (loan return to Mačva Šabac)
12	GK	BUL	Angel Manolov (released)
15	MF	MKD	Emran Ramadani (to (North Macedonia) FK Shkëndija)
18	FW	SRB	Rodoljub Marjanović (to Radnički Sombor)
—	DF	MNE	Ivan Maraš (loan extension to Tekstilac Ites)
—	FW	CRO	Gavro Bagić (was on loan, now moved to (Croatia) Metalac Osijek)
20	MF	SRB	Mihailo Dobrašinović (to FK Bežanija)

=== Metalac G.M. ===
In: Note: Flags indicate national team as defined under FIFA eligibility rules; some limited exceptions apply. Players may hold more than one non-FIFA nationality.

No.	Pos.	Nation	Player
1	GK	SRB	Živko Živković (on loan from Partizan Belgrade)
24	MF	MKD	Gjorgji Mojsov (from (North Macedonia) FK Vardar)
10	MF	SRB	Ivan Petrović (free, last with Sloboda Sevojno)
19	DF	MKD	Nikola Karčev (from (China) Shanghai East Asia)
—	DF	MNE	Gojko Žižić (from (Montenegro) Mladost Podgorica, was on loan at Čukarički Stankom)
—	DF	SRB	Nenad Stjepić (from Sinđelić Niš)
5	DF	SRB	Dejan Stamenković (from Mladost Lučani)
9	FW	SRB	Darko Isidorović (from FK Inđija)
2	DF	SRB	Boško Dopuđ (from (Montenegro) Mornar Bar)
21	FW	SRB	Bojan Živković (from FK Jagodina, was on loan at Mladost Lučani)
23	FW	SRB	Nemanja Đorić (from Proleter Novi Sad)
22	DF	SRB	Marko Mitrušić (from FK Sopot)
25	DF	SRB	Stefan Mitrović (from (Czech Republic) Zbrojovka Brno)
15	FW	GHA	Owusu-Ansah Kontoh (on loan from (Ghana) Asante Kotoko)
17	MF	GHA	Kwame Boateng (on loan from (Ghana) Asante Kotoko)
3	DF	SRB	Branislav Vukomanović (from (Hungary) Szolnoki MÁV)

Out: Note: Flags indicate national team as defined under FIFA eligibility rules; some limited exceptions apply. Players may hold more than one non-FIFA nationality.

No.	Pos.	Nation	Player
5	DF	SRB	Vladimir Otašević (to Spartak ZV Subotica)
2	DF	SRB	Petar Pavlović (to Radnički 1923 Kragujevac)
3	DF	SRB	Ljubo Nenadić (to Radnički 1923 Kragujevac)
10	MF	SRB	Predrag Pavlović (to OFK Beograd)
16	DF	SRB	Branislav Bajić (to (Spain) San Fernando CD)
22	FW	SRB	Bojan Zoranović (released)
—	MF	SRB	Miloš Nikolić (to FK Srem S.M.)
1	GK	SRB	Dejan Bogunović (to Proleter Novi Sad)
7	MF	SRB	Nenad Adamović (to FK Smederevo)
—	MF	SRB	Ivan Paunović (to OFK Mladenovac, was on loan at FK Novi Pazar)
23	FW	SRB	Vladimir Savićević (to FK Kolubara)
17	FW	GHA	Abel Hammond (released)
15	MF	SRB	Miloš Živković (to FK Srem S.M.)
21	MF	SRB	Nemanja Stošković (to Radnički Niš)
18	DF	SRB	Aleksandar Ivanović (to (North Macedonia) Bregalnica Štip, was on loan at (Bosnia and Herzegovina) Drina Zvornik)

=== Radnički 1923 Kragujevac ===
In: Note: Flags indicate national team as defined under FIFA eligibility rules; some limited exceptions apply. Players may hold more than one non-FIFA nationality.

No.	Pos.	Nation	Player
33	DF	SRB	Ljubo Nenadić (from FK Metalac G.M.)
10	FW	SRB	Stanimir Milošković (from (Greece) Pierikos)
24	DF	SRB	Petar Pavlović (from FK Metalac G.M.)
7	MF	SRB	Vladan Binić (on loan from Red Star Belgrade)
14	DF	SRB	Ivan Obrovac (from Mačva Šabac)
30	GK	SRB	Danilo Pustinjaković (from FK Novi Pazar)
16	MF	BIH	Stefan Udovičić (from Čukarički Stankom)

Out: Note: Flags indicate national team as defined under FIFA eligibility rules; some limited exceptions apply. Players may hold more than one non-FIFA nationality.

No.	Pos.	Nation	Player
—	FW	SRB	Nenad Đurđević (to FK Partizan BB)
—	MF	SRB	Vlada Radovanović (to FK Inđija)
—	MF	SRB	Slobodan Maksimović (to (Bosnia and Herzegovina) Rudar Prijedor)
—	DF	SRB	Novica Zajić (released)
—	MF	SRB	Boris Živanović (released)
—	FW	SRB	Jovan Stefanović (released)
—	GK	SRB	Nikola Prekić (released)
—	MF	SRB	Nikola Jeftić (released)
—	MF	SRB	Filip Osman (on loan to FK Voždovac)
—	MF	SRB	Srđan Grujičić (to Radnički Obrenovac)
—	MF	SRB	Stefan Milosavljević (on loan to Pobeda Beloševac)
—	MF	SRB	Aleksandar Varjačić (on loan to Pobeda Beloševac)
—	FW	SRB	Lazar Vidić (on loan to FK Mladi Radnik)
—	GK	SRB	Žarko Trifunović (on loan to Pobeda Beloševac)

=== FK Novi Pazar ===
In: Note: Flags indicate national team as defined under FIFA eligibility rules; some limited exceptions apply. Players may hold more than one non-FIFA nationality.

No.	Pos.	Nation	Player
8	MF	SRB	Filip Stojanović (from BASK)
6	DF	SRB	Bojan Ostojić (from BASK)
33	DF	SRB	Ivan Vujičić (from BASK)
18	GK	SRB	Borivoje Ristić (from BASK)
16	MF	SRB	Radan Šunjevarić (from Sloboda Sevojno)
10	FW	BIH	Edin Ademović (from Sloboda Sevojno)
9	FW	SRB	Miloš Bogunović (from Partizan Belgrade)
3	DF	SRB	Dragan Šarac (from Spartak ZV Subotica)
7	MF	SRB	Irfan Vusljanin (from FK Jagodina)
86	DF	SRB	Miloš Marković (from FK Bežanija)
20	MF	SRB	Ivan Pešić (from FK Bežanija)
15	DF	BIH	Bojan Petrić (from (Bosnia and Herzegovina) Borac Banja Luka)
33	MF	MNE	Marko Mugoša (on loan from Red Star Belgrade, was on loan at FK Jagodina)
15	DF	SRB	Aleksandar Petrović (from Sloboda Sevojno)
26	DF	BIH	Zoran Šupić (from (Hungary) Győri ETO)
12	GK	BIH	Sead Ramović (from (Turkey) Sivasspor)
22	MF	SRB	Semir Hadžibulić (from (Georgia (country)) Dinamo Tbilisi)
21	DF	SRB	Edin Ferizović (from (Albania) Besa Kavajë)

Out: Note: Flags indicate national team as defined under FIFA eligibility rules; some limited exceptions apply. Players may hold more than one non-FIFA nationality.

No.	Pos.	Nation	Player
—	DF	SRB	Bojan Đorđević (loan return to Red Star Belgrade, next to Napredak Kruševac)
22	GK	SRB	Danilo Pustinjaković (to Radnički 1923)
6	DF	SRB	Despot Višković (to (Saudi Arabia) Al-Ansar)
3	DF	SRB	Dragiša Pejović (to FK Bane)
18	MF	UGA	Vincent Kayizi (loan return to FK Srem S.M.)
10	MF	SRB	Vasilije Prodanović (to Borac Čačak)
8	MF	SRB	Ivan Paunović (loan return to FK Metalac G.M., next to OFK Mladenovac)
9	FW	SRB	Pavle Delibašić (to Napredak Kruševac)
—	MF	SRB	Elhan Bejtović (to FK Jošanica)
—	GK	SRB	Alija Alić (to FK Jošanica)
19	DF	SRB	Boban Cenić (to FK Mladi Radnik, brought from (Romania) Universitatea Cluj)
—	DF	SRB	Elvis Holić (on loan to FK Jošanica)
21	DF	SRB	Marko Sočanac (to FK Bane)
2	DF	SRB	Nikola Đurić (released, brought from BASK)
—	MF	SRB	Stevan Stošić (released)
—	DF	SRB	Emir Plojović (retired)

== See also ==
- Serbian SuperLiga
- 2011–12 Serbian SuperLiga
