= List of Serbian football transfers winter 2010–11 =

This is a list of transfers in Serbian football for the 2010–11 winter transfer window. Only moves featuring a Serbian Superliga side are listed. The order by which the clubs are listed is equal to the classification of the SuperLiga at the winter break.

== Serbian SuperLiga ==
=== Partizan Belgrade ===
In: Note: Flags indicate national team as defined under FIFA eligibility rules; some limited exceptions apply. Players may hold more than one non-FIFA nationality.

No.	Pos.	Nation	Player
28	FW	GHA	Prince Tagoe (on loan from (Germany) TSG 1899 Hoffenheim)
80	MF	SRB	Zvonimir Vukić (free, last played for (Russia) FC Moscow)
40	FW	GHA	Dominic Adiyiah (on loan from (Italy) A.C. Milan)
88	GK	SRB	Vladimir Stojković (previously on loan, now signed from (Portugal) Sporting CP)

Out: Note: Flags indicate national team as defined under FIFA eligibility rules; some limited exceptions apply. Players may hold more than one non-FIFA nationality.

No.	Pos.	Nation	Player
9	FW	BRA	Cléo (to (China) Guangzhou Evergrande)
17	FW	SRB	Predrag Mijić (to (Russia) Amkar Perm, previously with reserves squad)
24	DF	SRB	Matija Nastasić (on loan to FK Teleoptik)
10	MF	GBS	Moreira (to (China) Dalian Aerbin)

=== Red Star Belgrade ===
In: Note: Flags indicate national team as defined under FIFA eligibility rules; some limited exceptions apply. Players may hold more than one non-FIFA nationality.

No.	Pos.	Nation	Player
10	MF	BRA	Evandro Goebel (from (Brazil) Atlético Paranaense, was on loan at (Brazil) Vitória)
19	FW	COL	Cristian Borja (on loan from (Brazil) Caxias, was on loan at (Brazil) Flamengo)
5	DF	SRB	Uroš Ćosić (on loan from (Russia) CSKA Moscow)

Out: Note: Flags indicate national team as defined under FIFA eligibility rules; some limited exceptions apply. Players may hold more than one non-FIFA nationality.

No.	Pos.	Nation	Player
25	MF	SRB	Marko Blažić (to (Slovakia) MFK Ružomberok)
--	DF	BIH	Ognjen Vranješ (to (Russia) FC Krasnodar, previously on loan at (Moldova) Sheriff Tiraspol)
--	MF	SRB	Andrej Mrkela (on loan to FK Rad, previously on loan at FK Sopot)
5	DF	SRB	Bojan Đorđević (on loan to FK Novi Pazar)
--	MF	MNE	Marko Mugoša (on loan to FK Jagodina, previously on loan at (Montenegro) Budućnost Podgorica)
2	MF	BRA	Sávio (on loan to (China) Changchun Yatai)
--	DF	SRB	Jovan Krneta (on loan to FK Sopot)
4	DF	SRB	Uroš Spajić (on loan to FK Sopot)
6	DF	SRB	Nikola Ignjatijević (on loan to (Romania) FC Timișoara)
11	FW	SRB	Miloš Trifunović (on loan to (Uzbekistan) FC Bunyodkor)
18	DF	SRB	Slavoljub Đorđević (to (Uzbekistan) FC Bunyodkor)
33	GK	SRB	Bojan Pavlović (to (Azerbaijan) FK Qarabağ)
32	MF	SRB	Vladimir Bogdanović (to (China) Liaoning Whowin)
--	DF	SRB	Miloš Malović (On loan to Napredak Kruševac, was on loan at FK Sopot)
--	DF	SRB	Nikola Vasiljević (on loan to BSK Borča)

=== FK Vojvodina ===
In: Note: Flags indicate national team as defined under FIFA eligibility rules; some limited exceptions apply. Players may hold more than one non-FIFA nationality.

No.	Pos.	Nation	Player
10	MF	SRB	Slobodan Novaković (loan return from Hajduk Kula)
—	MF	MKD	Filip Naumčevski (from FK Cementarnica 55, to youth team)

Out: Note: Flags indicate national team as defined under FIFA eligibility rules; some limited exceptions apply. Players may hold more than one non-FIFA nationality.

No.	Pos.	Nation	Player
20	DF	SRB	Milovan Milović (on loan to (Albania) Dinamo Tirana)
--	FW	SRB	Đorđe Šušnjar (loan extension to Donji Srem Pećinci)
30	GK	SRB	Damir Drinić (on loan to Donji Srem Pećinci, previously on loan at FK Veternik)
—	DF	MNE	Stefan Zogović (on loan to FK Novi Sad, previously on loan at FK Palić)
19	FW	SRB	Ognjen Mudrinski (on loan to FK Novi Sad)
10	MF	MKD	Mario Gjurovski (to (Ukraine) Metalurh Donetsk)

=== Rad Beograd ===
In: Note: Flags indicate national team as defined under FIFA eligibility rules; some limited exceptions apply. Players may hold more than one non-FIFA nationality.

No.	Pos.	Nation	Player
3	FW	SRB	Nemanja Obradović (loan return from (Bosnia and Herzegovina) Drina Zvornik)
9	MF	SRB	Andrej Mrkela (on loan from Red Star Belgrade, previously on loan at FK Sopot)
—	MF	MKD	Žan Manovski (on loan from (North Macedonia) FK Cementarnica 55, to youth team)
12	GK	SRB	Nenad Filipović (from (Hungary) MTK Budapest)
—	MF	MNE	Jovan Nikolić (from (Montenegro) Budućnost Podgorica)
16	DF	SRB	Ivan Rogač (from Red Star Belgrade, was on loan at FK Sopot)

Out: Note: Flags indicate national team as defined under FIFA eligibility rules; some limited exceptions apply. Players may hold more than one non-FIFA nationality.

No.	Pos.	Nation	Player
—	DF	SRB	Nemanja Pejčinović (was on loan, now signed with (France) OGC Nice)
3	DF	SRB	Đorđe Čotra (to (Poland) Polonia Warszawa)
7	MF	SRB	Miloš Dimitrijević (on loan to (Italy) Chievo Verona)
18	DF	MNE	Srđan Ajković (on loan to (Montenegro) FK Lovćen)
—	FW	BIH	Miloš Galin (on loan to (Bosnia and Herzegovina) Drina Zvornik, previously on loan at Donji Srem)
—	DF	SRB	Aleksandar Petrović (to Sloboda Sevojno)
—	MF	SRB	Branko Mihajlović (to (Montenegro) FK Lovćen)
—	DF	SRB	Jevrem Kosnić (on loan to FK Bežanija)
5	DF	SRB	Radomir Koković (on loan to (China) Changchun Yatai)

=== Sloboda Sevojno ===
In: Note: Flags indicate national team as defined under FIFA eligibility rules; some limited exceptions apply. Players may hold more than one non-FIFA nationality.

No.	Pos.	Nation	Player
25	GK	MNE	Darko Božović (free, last played for FK Partizan)
55	DF	SRB	Aleksandar Petrović (from FK Rad)
20	FW	SRB	Savo Kovačević (from Proleter Novi Sad)
17	DF	SRB	Bogdan Planić (from Zlatibor Čajetina)
2	DF	SRB	Jovica Vasilić (on loan from Sloga Kraljevo)
44	MF	SVK	Maroš Klimpl (from (Czech Republic) Viktoria Žižkov)
33	MF	CZE	Tomáš Poláček (free, last played for (Czech Republic) Mladá Boleslav)
16	FW	BRA	Thiago Galvão (from (Brazil) Joseense)
19	MF	BRA	Ricardinho (on loan from (Brazil) Corinthians B)
26	MF	SRB	Nikola Tasić (from Dinamo Vranje)

Out: Note: Flags indicate national team as defined under FIFA eligibility rules; some limited exceptions apply. Players may hold more than one non-FIFA nationality.

No.	Pos.	Nation	Player
30	MF	BIH	Petar Jovanović (loan return to (Romania) FC Vaslui)
19	FW	SRB	Nemanja Arsenijević (to (Greece) Asteras Tripolis)
20	MF	SRB	Marko Ljubinković (to (Cyprus) Anorthosis FC)
26	DF	MKD	Darko Micevski (to (North Macedonia) Rabotnički Skopje)
2	DF	SRB	Rade Novković (released)
25	GK	SRB	Aleksandar Marinković (on loan to Jedinstvo Putevi)
17	MF	SRB	Ivan Petrović (released)

=== Spartak ZV Subotica ===
In: Note: Flags indicate national team as defined under FIFA eligibility rules; some limited exceptions apply. Players may hold more than one non-FIFA nationality.

No.	Pos.	Nation	Player
14	MF	BIH	Miroslav Čovilo (from FK Inđija)
22	MF	BIH	Igor Mišan (from OFK Beograd, previously on loan at Radnički Sombor)
26	MF	MNE	Darko Karadžić (from (Montenegro) Rudar Pljevlja)
23	FW	SRB	Lazar Veselinović (loan return from Proleter Novi Sad)

Out: Note: Flags indicate national team as defined under FIFA eligibility rules; some limited exceptions apply. Players may hold more than one non-FIFA nationality.

No.	Pos.	Nation	Player
14	FW	SRB	Vojo Ubiparip (to (Poland) Lech Poznań)
22	MF	MNE	Darko Bošković (to (Montenegro) FK Grbalj)

=== Javor Ivanjica ===
In: Note: Flags indicate national team as defined under FIFA eligibility rules; some limited exceptions apply. Players may hold more than one non-FIFA nationality.

No.	Pos.	Nation	Player
9	FW	SRB	Marko Stevanović (on loan from Rudar Kostolac)
1	GK	BIH	Nemanja Supić (from (Romania) FC Timișoara)
14	FW	SRB	Sead Hadžibulić (from (Albania) Besa Kavaje)
18	FW	SRB	Miloš Milivojević (on loan from Mladi Radnik)
5	MF	BIH	Branko Ostojić (from Partizan B.Brdo)

Out: Note: Flags indicate national team as defined under FIFA eligibility rules; some limited exceptions apply. Players may hold more than one non-FIFA nationality.

No.	Pos.	Nation	Player
25	DF	BIH	Željko Đokić (to (Poland) Ruch Chorzów)
1	GK	SRB	Damir Kahriman (to (Ukraine) Tavriya Simferopol)
5	DF	SRB	Goran Gogić (released)
—	DF	SRB	Boris Miličić (to (Hungary) Szolnoki MÁV, previously on loan at FK Inđija)
30	DF	SRB	Nikola Prebiračević (to (Bosnia and Herzegovina) Drina Zvornik)
—	MF	SRB	Filip Stojanović (to (Albania) Kastrioti Krujë, previously on loan at Čukarički Stankom)
14	FW	NGR	Obiora Odita (to (China) Tianjin Teda)
18	FW	SRB	Aleksandar Leposavić (on loan to Sloga Petrovac)
—	FW	SRB	Bojan Brajković (on loan to Čukarički Stankom, was on loan at FK Kolubara)
29	FW	SRB	Nenad Panić (released)
19	DF	SRB	Bojan Mališić (to (Kazakhstan) Nasaf Qarshi)

=== FK Smederevo ===
In: Note: Flags indicate national team as defined under FIFA eligibility rules; some limited exceptions apply. Players may hold more than one non-FIFA nationality.

No.	Pos.	Nation	Player
6	DF	SRB	Miloš Karišik (from FK Teleoptik)
44	MF	SRB	Stevan Kovačević (from (Portugal) Naval 1º de Maio)
32	FW	SRB	Igor Grkajac (from FK Novi Pazar)

Out: Note: Flags indicate national team as defined under FIFA eligibility rules; some limited exceptions apply. Players may hold more than one non-FIFA nationality.

No.	Pos.	Nation	Player
9	FW	SRB	Saša Ranković (to Southern Myanmar United FC)
—	FW	SRB	Nenad Mladenović (to FK Inđija, previously on loan at (China) Changsha Ginde)
10	FW	SRB	Nenad Marinković (to (Israel) Bnei Yehuda)
—	GK	SRB	Momir Kuljanin (on loan to Grafičar Beograd)

=== FK Jagodina ===
In: Note: Flags indicate national team as defined under FIFA eligibility rules; some limited exceptions apply. Players may hold more than one non-FIFA nationality.

No.	Pos.	Nation	Player
27	MF	MNE	Marko Mugoša (On loan from Red Star Belgrade, previously on loan at (Montenegro) Budućnost Podgorica)
28	GK	SRB	Mateo Radovanović (from (Greece) Panathinaikos)
18	FW	SRB	Miloš Stojanović (from (Slovakia) ViOn Zlaté Moravce)
15	DF	SRB	Josip Projić (from Napredak Kruševac)
13	DF	SRB	Duško Dukić (from (Romania) FC Timișoara)
6	DF	SRB	Aleksandar Vasiljević (from (Kazakhstan) Irtysh Pavlodar)
25	DF	SRB	Ivan Dragičević (from (Iran) Damash Lorestan)
30	FW	MKD	Dragan Stojkov (from Napredak Kruševac)
4	DF	SRB	Saša Nikodijević (from Radnički Svilajnac)
22	MF	SRB	Ivan Jovanović (from FK Teleoptik)
5	DF	SRB	Vukašin Tomić (loan return from Mladost Lučani)
32	FW	SRB	Nedeljko Đurić (from Sloga Petrovac)
16	FW	NGR	Victor Agbo (from Rudar Kostolac)

Out: Note: Flags indicate national team as defined under FIFA eligibility rules; some limited exceptions apply. Players may hold more than one non-FIFA nationality.

No.	Pos.	Nation	Player
4	DF	SRB	Marko Đorđević (to (Kazakhstan) Kairat Almaty)
25	DF	SRB	Marko Simić (to (Belarus) BATE Borisov)
30	MF	SRB	Nenad Šljivić (to (Kazakhstan) Tobol Kostanay)
20	DF	SRB	Marko Popović (to (Bosnia and Herzegovina) Zrinjski Mostar)
8	MF	SRB	Miloš Živković (on loan to Mladi Radnik)
29	MF	SRB	Bojan Živković (on loan to Mladost Lučani)
31	FW	SRB	Velimir Stanković (on loan to Sloga Despotovac)
—	DF	SRB	Srđan Lukić (retired, became youth squad coach)
—	DF	SRB	Boban Nikolić (to FK Zemun, was on loan at (Romania) FCM Târgu Mureş)
—	DF	SRB	Miloš Živković (to FK Metalac GM)

=== OFK Beograd ===
In: Note: Flags indicate national team as defined under FIFA eligibility rules; some limited exceptions apply. Players may hold more than one non-FIFA nationality.

No.	Pos.	Nation	Player
6	DF	MNE	Miloš Mrvaljević (loan return from FK Bežanija)
14	FW	ECU	Augusto Batioja (from FK Inđija)
3	DF	MNE	Stevan Marković (from (Montenegro) FK Grbalj)
32	DF	SRB	Marko Milić (from FK Bežanija)
26	MF	SRB	Igor Jelić (from FK Bežanija)

Out: Note: Flags indicate national team as defined under FIFA eligibility rules; some limited exceptions apply. Players may hold more than one non-FIFA nationality.

No.	Pos.	Nation	Player
8	MF	SRB	Uroš Sinđić (to (Greece) Panserraikos)
3	DF	SRB	Aleksandar Mijatović (released)
17	DF	SRB	Igor Popović (released)
—	DF	SRB	Nenad Lazarevski (loan extension to Radnički Sombor)
—	FW	MNE	Luka Merdović (loan return to (Montenegro) Mladost Podgorica)
—	MF	BIH	Igor Mišan (to Spartak ZV Subotica, previously on loan at Radnički Sombor)

=== BSK Borča ===
In: Note: Flags indicate national team as defined under FIFA eligibility rules; some limited exceptions apply. Players may hold more than one non-FIFA nationality.

No.	Pos.	Nation	Player
1	GK	AUS	Tomislav Arčaba (from (Romania) Internaţional Argeş)
27	MF	SRB	Aleksandar Simović (from Red Star Belgrade youth)
15	DF	SRB	Bojan Ušumović (from Red Star Belgrade youth, previously on loan at (Bosnia and Herzegovina) Proleter Teslić)
3	DF	SRB	Nikola Vasiljević (on loan from Red Star Belgrade)
22	FW	SRB	Marko Jakšić (from FK Metalac G.M.)
5	DF	SRB	Miloš Krstić (from Balkan Bukovica)
28	MF	SRB	Vojkan Miljković (on loan from FK Partizan, was on loan with FK Teleoptik)
29	FW	SRB	Ivan Damnjanović (from Lepušnica Glogonjski Rit)

Out: Note: Flags indicate national team as defined under FIFA eligibility rules; some limited exceptions apply. Players may hold more than one non-FIFA nationality.

No.	Pos.	Nation	Player
1	GK	SRB	Nemanja Džodžo (to (Belgium) RS Charleroi)
28	DF	SRB	Ivan Vukadinović (to (Romania) Gaz Metan Mediaş)
22	FW	SRB	Aleksandar Đukić (to Hajduk Kula)
27	MF	SRB	Vladan Čikarić (released)
32	DF	SRB	Spasoje Stefanović (to FK Teleoptik)
5	MF	SRB	Zoran Knežević (to (Russia) Gazovik Orenburg)
—	MF	SRB	Marko Grulović (to Čukarički Stankom, was with youth team)

=== FK Inđija ===
In: Note: Flags indicate national team as defined under FIFA eligibility rules; some limited exceptions apply. Players may hold more than one non-FIFA nationality.

No.	Pos.	Nation	Player
8	MF	SRB	Slobodan Slović (from (Belgium) Capellen)
77	FW	SRB	Asmir Misini (from FK Novi Pazar)
21	FW	SRB	Đorđe Antonić (from Bačka 1901)
25	MF	SRB	Saša Tomanović (loan return from Radnički Sombor)
9	FW	SRB	Bojan Dubajić (loan return from Radnički Sombor)
—	MF	SRB	Danilo Marković (loan return from Cement Beočin)
11	FW	SRB	Nenad Mladenović (from FK Smederevo, previously on loan at (China) Changsha Ginde)
6	DF	MNE	Jovan Tanasijević (from (Russia) Salyut Belgorod)
13	DF	SRB	Nenad Živanović (on loan from Budućnost Valjevo)
26	DF	SRB	Bojan Neziri (free, last played for (Hungary) Győri ETO)

Out: Note: Flags indicate national team as defined under FIFA eligibility rules; some limited exceptions apply. Players may hold more than one non-FIFA nationality.

No.	Pos.	Nation	Player
4	DF	SRB	Boris Miličić (loan return to Javor Ivanjica, then transferred to (Hungary) Szolnoki MÁV)
21	DF	SRB	Zoran Ljubinković (to (Romania) Petrolul Ploieşti)
25	DF	SRB	Bojan Krasić (released)
9	FW	ARG	Guido Barreyro (on loan to (Sweden) FC Rosengård)
13	DF	MNE	Nenad Đurović (to (Hungary) Szolnoki MÁV)
7	MF	BUL	Zoran Janković (retired)
8	FW	SRB	Aleksandar Naglić (to FK Metalac G.M.)
23	DF	SRB	Branislav Vejnović (on loan to Radnički Sombor)
26	MF	BIH	Miroslav Čovilo (to Spartak ZV Subotica)
1	GK	SRB	Milan Dević (retired, now goalkeeping coach at (Thailand) Muangthong United)
71	FW	ECU	Augusto Batioja (to OFK Beograd)
6	DF	MNE	Aleksandar Dubljević (to (Montenegro) Sutjeska Nikšić)
11	MF	SRB	Marko Anđelković (to (Lithuania) FK Ekranas)
—	MF	BIH	Jovan Golić (was on loan, now signed with (Russia) Spartak Nalchik)

=== Borac Čačak ===
In: Note: Flags indicate national team as defined under FIFA eligibility rules; some limited exceptions apply. Players may hold more than one non-FIFA nationality.

No.	Pos.	Nation	Player
8	FW	SRB	Jovan Damjanović (from (Germany) SV Wehen Wiesbaden)
31	MF	SRB	Dušan Petronijević (from (Iran) Damash Lorestan)
88	MF	SRB	Marko Krasić (from FK Metalac G. M.)
5	DF	SRB	Nenad Višnjić (from Čukarički Stankom)
15	MF	SRB	Semir Sadović (from FK Novi Pazar)
7	FW	SRB	Aleksandar Stoimirović (from Čukarički Stankom)
12	GK	SRB	Nikola Petrić (loan return from Mladost Lučani)

Out: Note: Flags indicate national team as defined under FIFA eligibility rules; some limited exceptions apply. Players may hold more than one non-FIFA nationality.

No.	Pos.	Nation	Player
13	DF	SRB	Zoran Antić (to FK Metalac G.M.)
3	FW	SRB	Boban Stojanović (to Srem Jakovo)
6	DF	SRB	Boban Dmitrović (to FK Novi Pazar)
25	DF	SRB	Dragiša Pejović (to FK Novi Pazar)
5	DF	SRB	Nemanja Milunović (loan extension to Mladost Lučani)
27	MF	SRB	Nebojša Gavrić (on loan to (Bosnia and Herzegovina) Rudar Ugljevik)
7	MF	SRB	Slaviša Jeremić (released)
8	MF	MNE	Miloš Stojčev (to (United States) Sporting Kansas City)
—	FW	SRB	Dragan Čvorić (to Mladost Lučani, was on loan at Polet Ljubić)

=== Metalac G.M. ===
In: Note: Flags indicate national team as defined under FIFA eligibility rules; some limited exceptions apply. Players may hold more than one non-FIFA nationality.

No.	Pos.	Nation	Player
8	FW	SRB	Aleksandar Naglić (from FK Inđija)
13	DF	SRB	Zoran Antić (from Borac Čačak)
10	MF	SRB	Predrag Pavlović (from (Hungary) Debreceni VSC)
9	GK	SRB	Filip Kljajić (from Šumadija Jagnjilo)
25	MF	SRB	Svetislav Milić (from Železničar Lajkovac)
22	DF	SRB	Nenad Stjepić (on loan from Sinđelić Niš)
15	DF	SRB	Miloš Živković (free, last with FK Novi Pazar)
17	FW	GHA	Abel Hammond (from (India) East Bengal)

Out: Note: Flags indicate national team as defined under FIFA eligibility rules; some limited exceptions apply. Players may hold more than one non-FIFA nationality.

No.	Pos.	Nation	Player
17	MF	SRB	Ivan Paunović (to FK Novi Pazar)
8	MF	SRB	Marko Krasić (to Borac Čačak)
9	FW	SRB	Marko Jakšić (to BSK Borča)
13	DF	SRB	Darko Rakočević (to (Thailand) Chonburi FC)
10	MF	SRB	Rajko Brežančić (on loan to FK Bežanija)
21	DF	SRB	Danko Filipović (on loan to Sloboda Čačak)
15	MF	SRB	Miloš Nikolić (loan return to Srem S.Mitrovica)
22	DF	SRB	Bojan Zoranović (on loan to Metalac Kraljevo)

=== Hajduk Kula ===
In: Note: Flags indicate national team as defined under FIFA eligibility rules; some limited exceptions apply. Players may hold more than one non-FIFA nationality.

No.	Pos.	Nation	Player
4	MF	MNE	Vuk Đurić (from FK Srem)
10	MF	SRB	Dejan Perić (on loan from Mačva Šabac)
27	FW	CRO	Miloš Mišić (from (Greece) Tyrnavos 2005)
6	DF	SRB	Petar Mudreša (from (Albania) Apolonia Fier)
5	DF	SRB	Aleksandar Živanović (from Čukarički Stankom)
14	FW	SRB	Aleksandar Đukić (from BSK Borča)
2	DF	SRB	Dragan Stević (from Sloga Petrovac)
25	GK	SRB	Bojan Vojisavljević (from Sloga Petrovac)
29	FW	SRB	Aleksandar Čovin (on loan from AIK Bačka Topola)
20	MF	SRB	Mihailo Dobrašinović (from FK Kolubara)
47	DF	SRB	Slobodan Lalić (loan return from AIK Bačka Topola)
46	MF	SRB	Boris Varga (loan return from Polet Sivac)

Out: Note: Flags indicate national team as defined under FIFA eligibility rules; some limited exceptions apply. Players may hold more than one non-FIFA nationality.

No.	Pos.	Nation	Player
4	DF	SRB	Siniša Radanović (to (Hungary) Kecskeméti TE)
6	DF	SRB	Đorđe Mrđanin (to (Kazakhstan) Vostok Oskemen)
14	MF	SRB	Slobodan Novaković (loan return to FK Vojvodina)
10	DF	SRB	Igor Kozoš (to Radnički Bajmok)
27	FW	CRO	Gavro Bagić (to (Croatia) Metalac Osijek)
5	DF	SRB	Damir Topčagić (on loan to Solunac Rastina)
20	MF	MNE	Blažo Lalević (on loan to Timok Zaječar)
29	DF	MNE	Ivan Maraš (to Tekstilac Ites)
7	MF	SRB	Dejan Kekezović (released)
—	DF	SRB	Vuk Redžić (on loan to Hajduk Beograd)

=== Čukarički Stankom ===
In: Note: Flags indicate national team as defined under FIFA eligibility rules; some limited exceptions apply. Players may hold more than one non-FIFA nationality.

No.	Pos.	Nation	Player
11	DF	SRB	Saša Janaćković (from FK Zemun)
9	FW	SRB	Bojan Brajković (from FK Javor, was on loan at FK Kolubara)
5	DF	MNE	Gojko Žižić (from (Montenegro) FK Dečić)
17	DF	SRB	Nemanja Ilić (free, last with FK Metalac GM)
8	FW	SRB	Dejan Marić (from FK Žarkovo)
28	MF	SRB	Igor Aničić (on loan from Hajduk Beograd)
23	FW	SRB	Kosta Bjedov (from (Malta) Qormi)
18	MF	SRB	Marko Bašara (free, last with (Romania) Pandurii)
7	MF	SRB	Blažo Bulatović (from Napredak Kruševac)
12	GK	SRB	Miloš Zorić (from Radnički N.Beograd)
22	MF	SRB	Mane Trkulja (free)
30	DF	SRB	Igor Filipović (free)
20	MF	SRB	Miroslav Petronijević (from Napredak Kruševac)
36	MF	SRB	Marko Grulović (from BSK Borča)

Out: Note: Flags indicate national team as defined under FIFA eligibility rules; some limited exceptions apply. Players may hold more than one non-FIFA nationality.

No.	Pos.	Nation	Player
28	MF	BIH	Nenad Kiso (to (Bosnia and Herzegovina) Olimpik Sarajevo)
17	MF	SRB	Filip Stojanović (loan return to FK Javor, then transferred to (Albania) Kastrioti Krujë)
21	DF	SRB	Nenad Višnjić (to Borac Čačak)
8	FW	SRB	Dragan Milovanović (to Napredak Kruševac)
5	DF	SRB	Aleksandar Živanović (to Hajduk Kula)
11	MF	SRB	Aleksandar Stoimirović (to Borac Čačak)
20	MF	SRB	Mihajlo Cakić (to (Ukraine) Zorya Luhansk)
7	FW	SRB	Vladimir Ribić (to (Thailand) Chonburi FC)
9	FW	SRB	Milanko Rašković (to (Kazakhstan) Shakhter Karagandy)
12	DF	SRB	Aleksandar Trninić (to (Slovakia) Zemplín Michalovce)
23	MF	SRB	Nikola Rnić (to Srem Jakovo)
18	FW	SRB	Stefan Kočanović (released)
—	DF	SRB	Miljan Anđelić (to Balkan Mirijevo)

== See also ==
- Serbian SuperLiga
- 2010–11 Serbian SuperLiga
- List of Serbian football transfers summer 2010
