= Višnjić =

Višnjić (Serbian: Вишњић) is a surname. Notable people with the surname include:

- Aleksandar Višnjić (born 1976), Serbian politician
- Biserka Višnjić (born 1953), Croatian handball player
- Filip Višnjić (1767–1834), Bosnian Serb poet and gusle player
- Goran Višnjić (born 1972), Croatian actor
- Josip Višnjić (born 1966), Serbian football player and manager
- Miroslav Josić Višnjić (1946–2015), Serbian writer and poet
- Nenad Višnjić (born 1983), football player
