= Dejan Radosavljević =

Serbian footballer

Personal information
- Full name: Dejan Radosavljević
- Date of birth: 5 May 1979 (age 47)
- Place of birth: Dolac, SFR Yugoslavia
- Height: 1.83 m (6 ft 0 in)
- Position: Midfielder

Senior career*
Years	Team	Apps	(Gls)
2001–2006	Jedinstvo Donja Mutnica		
2006–2007	Jedinstvo Paraćin		
2007–2009	Jagodina	46	(0)
2008–2009	→ Sevojno (loan)	12	(1)
2009–2010	Novi Pazar	16	(1)
2010	→ Radnički Niš (loan)	14	(0)
2010–2011	Napredak Kruševac	28	(0)
2011–2013	Sloga Kraljevo	72	(2)
2014–2015	Borac Čačak	13	(0)
2015–2016	Sloga Kraljevo	21	(0)
2017–2019	Radnički Kovači		
- * Club domestic league appearances and goals as of 5 July 2016

Dejan Radosavljević (Serbian Cyrillic: Дејан Радосављевић; born 5 May 1979) is a Serbian former football midfielder.

He has previously played with FK Jedinstvo Donja Mutnica, FK Jedinstvo Paraćin, FK Jagodina, FK Sevojno, FK Novi Pazar, FK Radnički Niš, FK Napredak Kruševac, FK Sloga Kraljevo and FK Borac Čačak.
