= Vladimir Savićević =

Vladimir Savićević may refer to:

- Vladimir Savićević (Serbian footballer) (born 1986), Serbian association football player
- Vladimir Savićević (Montenegrin footballer) (born 1989), Montenegrin association football player, the son of Dejan Savićević
