= Bogdan Marjanović =

Serbian footballer

Personal information
- Full name: Bogdan Marjanović
- Date of birth: 3 November 1980 (age 45)
- Place of birth: Ćuprija, SFR Yugoslavia
- Height: 1.88 m (6 ft 2 in)
- Position: Defender

Youth career
- Srem

Senior career*
Years	Team	Apps	(Gls)
2001–2002	Zvezdara	19	(1)
2002–2004	Srem	14	(0)
2003–2004	Morava Ćuprija	18	(0)
2004–2006	Jedinstvo Donja Mutnica		
2006–2007	Jedinstvo Paraćin		
2007–2009	Jagodina	48	(1)
2009–2010	Mornar	11	(0)
2010	Napredak Kruševac	3	(0)
2011-2015	Sloga Despotovac		
2015-2016	Morava Ćuprija		
- * Club domestic league appearances and goals

Bogdan Marjanović (Serbian Cyrillic: Богдан Марјановић; born 3 November 1980) is a Serbian retired footballer.

== Career ==
Marjanović previously played for FK Zvezdara and FK Jagodina in the Serbian SuperLiga, beside having represented some lower league clubs as FK Srem, FK Morava Ćuprija, FK Jedinstvo Donja Mutnica and FK Jedinstvo Paraćin. Before coming to FK Napredak Kruševac he played in Montenegrin First League club FK Mornar.
