= Savićević =

Savićević or Savičević (Cyrillic script: Савићевић) is a Serb and Montenegrin surname. It may refer to:

- Božidar Savićević, Serbian actor
- Dejan Savićević, Serbian football player, former A.C. Milan and Red Star Belgrade player.
- Radmila Savićević, Serbian actress
- Bojan Savicevic, Austrian American Football Official (Referee) / TV-Expert for NFL on PULS4
- Saša Savićević, First Serb in space
- Vladimir Savićević, Serbian footballer
- Vukan Savićević, Serbian footballer
