= Paunović =

Paunović (Serbian Cyrillic: Пауновић) is a Serbian surname derived from the masculine given name Paun. It may refer to:

- Aleks Paunovic, Canadian actor
- Blagoje Paunović (1947–2014), footballer and manager
- Ivan Paunović (born 1986), football midfielder
- Marko Paunović (born 1988), football defender
- Milenko Paunović (1889–1924), composer and writer
- Nikola Paunović (born 1985), singer
- Rodoljub Paunović (born 1985), footballer
- Sava Paunović (born 1947), footballer
- Veljko Paunović (born 1977), footballer
