= Ivan Petrović =

Ivan Petrović (Cyrillic: Иван Петровић) may refer to:

- Ivan Petrović (footballer, born 1993)
- Ivan Petrović (footballer, born 1986)
- Ivan Petrović (footballer, born 1980)
- Ivan Petrović (footballer, born 1978)

or:

- Iván Petrovich
