= Nikola Vasiljević =

Nikola Vasiljević may refer to:

- Nikola Vasiljević (Bosnian footballer) (born 1983), defender for Shakhter Karagandy, Drina Zvornik, and FK Modriča
- Nikola Vasiljević (Serbian footballer, born 1983), defender for FK Leotar
- Nikola Vasiljević (footballer, born 1991), Serbian defender for Tokushima Vortis
- Nikola Vasiljević (footballer, born 1996), Serbian football goalkeeper for Radnik Surdulica
