= Ivan Ćirka =

Serbian footballer

Personal information
- Full name: Ivan Ćirka
- Date of birth: 3 July 1977 (age 49)
- Place of birth: Pančevo, SFR Yugoslavia
- Height: 1.86 m (6 ft 1 in)
- Position: Defender

Senior career*
Years	Team	Apps	(Gls)
1996–2001	Dinamo Pančevo		
2002–2007	Hajduk Kula	129	(3)
2008	OFK Beograd	7	(0)
2008	Mladost Apatin	9	(0)
2009	Slavija Sarajevo	12	(0)
2009–2010	Novi Pazar	27	(3)
2010–2011	BASK	10	(0)
2012	Dinamo Pančevo		
2012	Borac Šabac		
2013–2014	Dinamo Pančevo		
- * Club domestic league appearances and goals

Ivan Ćirka (Serbian Cyrillic: Иван Ћирка; born 3 July 1977) is a Serbian retired footballer.

Ćirka started his playing career with Dinamo Pančevo, before moving to Hajduk Kula in the 2002 winter transfer window. He spent the following six years there, making near 130 league appearances for the club in the top flight.

== Career statistics ==
Club	Season	League	
Club	Season	Apps	Goals
Hajduk Kula	2001–02	11	1
Hajduk Kula	2002–03	24	0
Hajduk Kula	2003–04	24	0
Hajduk Kula	2004–05	24	0
Hajduk Kula	2005–06	28	2
Hajduk Kula	2006–07	5	0
Hajduk Kula	2007–08	13	0
Hajduk Kula	Total	129	3
