= Nikola Milojević (footballer) =

Serbian footballer (born 1981)

Personal information
- Full name: Nikola Milojević
- Date of birth: 16 April 1981 (age 45)
- Place of birth: Mladenovac, SFR Yugoslavia
- Height: 1.92 m (6 ft 3 1/2 in)
- Position: Goalkeeper

Senior career*
Years	Team	Apps	(Gls)
1998–1999	Mladenovac	2	(0)
1999–2000	Zemun	0	(0)
2000–2003	Bane	70	(0)
2003–2006	Hajduk Kula	43	(0)
2006–2009	Vitória Setúbal	21	(0)
2010–2012	Borac Čačak	53	(0)
2013	Smederevo	1	(0)

International career
2004	Serbia and Montenegro U21	4	(0)
2004	Serbia and Montenegro U23	3	(0)
Medal record
Men's football
Representing Serbia and Montenegro
UEFA European Under-21 Championship
Runner-up	2004 Germany
- * Club domestic league appearances and goals

Nikola Milojević (Serbian Cyrillic: Никола Милојевић, pronounced [nǐkola mǐlojeʋitɕ, - milǒː-]; born 16 April 1981) is a Serbian retired professional footballer who played as a goalkeeper.

Milojević made a name for himself at Hajduk Kula, before moving to Vitória Setúbal in the summer of 2006. He also played for Borac Čačak and Smederevo after returning to his homeland.

At international level, Milojević won the silver medal at the 2004 UEFA Under-21 Championship. He also represented Serbia and Montenegro at the 2004 Summer Olympics.

== Honours ==
Vitória Setúbal

- Taça da Liga: 2007–08

Borac Čačak

- Serbian Cup: Runner-up 2011–12
