= Aleksandar Avrić =

Croatian footballer

Personal information
- Full name: Aleksandar Avrić
- Date of birth: 6 March 1988 (age 38)
- Place of birth: Osijek, SR Croatia, SFR Yugoslavia
- Height: 1.84 m (6 ft 0 in)
- Position: Midfielder

Senior career*
Years	Team	Apps	(Gls)
2004–2005	→ Šajkaš Kovilj (loan)	8	(2)
2005–2010	Novi Sad	110	(8)
2010–2011	Spartak Subotica	16	(0)
2011	Hajduk Kula	4	(0)
2012	Radnički Sombor	16	(0)
2012–2013	Inđija	10	(0)
2013	Mladost Velika Obarska	11	(0)
2014	Novi Sad	11	(3)
2014	Bačka Palanka	13	(1)
2015-2016	Gute	48	(3)
2017-2019	Mora	56	(3)
2020	Nordvärmland	4	(0)
2022-2023	Mora	20	(0)
- * Club domestic league appearances and goals as of 9 March 2024

Aleksandar Avrić (Serbian Cyrillic: Александар Аврић; born 6 March 1988) is a Serbian professional footballer who plays as a midfielder.

He has played in the Swedish lower leagues since 2015, starting at Gute and later playing for IFK Mora and Nordvärmlands FF.
