= Nenad Simić =

Serbian footballer

Personal information
- Full name: Nenad Simić
- Date of birth: 16 April 1984 (age 42)
- Place of birth: Kraljevo, SFR Yugoslavia
- Position: Midfielder

Senior career*
Years	Team	Apps	(Gls)
2002-2003	Jedinstvo DM		
2003-2005	Morava Ćuprija		
2005-2011	Jagodina		
2008-2010	→ OFK Mladenovac (loan)		
2010	→ Novi Pazar (loan)	6	(1)
2011	→ Šumadija Aranđelovac (loan)		
2011–2012	Voždovac		
2012–2013	Jedinstvo Putevi	28	(2)
2013	Radnik Surdulica	11	(1)
2014	Timok	13	(1)
2014	→ Burlington (loan)	18	(5)
2014	Sloga Kraljevo	9	(0)
2015–2016	Loznica	23	(2)
2016	Bežanija		
2017-2018	Jedinstvo Paraćin		
2018	Huginn	19	(4)
2018	Jedinstvo Surčin		
2019	FK Leštane		
2019-2020	Jedinstvo Paraćin		
2021	SFS Borac Paraćin		
- * Club domestic league appearances and goals

Nenad Simić (born 16 April 1984) is a Serbian retired footballer.

== Playing career ==
Simić began his career in 2002 with FK Jedinstvo Donja Mutnica in the Serbian League. In 2003, he played in the Second League of Serbia and Montenegro with Morava Ćuprija. In 2005, he signed with FK Jagodina, and had several loan spells with Radnicki Kragujevac, FK Mladenovac, Sumadija Jagnjilo, FK Novi Pazar, and Sumadija Arandjelovac. He later played with FK Voždovac. In 2012, he played in the Serbian First League with Jedinstvo Putevi Užice.

During his time in the Serbian First League he also played with FK Radnik Surdulica, and FK Timok. In 2014, he played abroad with Burlington SC in the Canadian Soccer League. In 2014, he returned to Serbia First League to sign with FK Sloga Kraljevo, and later with FK Loznica in 2015. In 2016, he signed with FK Bežanija, and for the remainder of the season he played in the Serbian League East with FK Jedinstvo Paraćin.
