= Ivan Petrović (footballer, born 1978) =

Serbian footballer

Personal information
- Full name: Ivan Petrović
- Date of birth: 5 October 1978 (age 48)
- Place of birth: Kraljevo, SFR Yugoslavia
- Height: 1.85 m (6 ft 1 in)
- Position: Midfielder

Senior career*
Years	Team	Apps	(Gls)
- Sloga Kraljevo
- Partizan
- Milicionar
2001–2004	Čukarički	21	(2)
2004–2006	OFK Beograd	63	(5)
2007	Nanjing		
2007–2011	Ethnikos Achna	75	(8)
2011	OFK Beograd	4	(0)
2016–2017	Radnički Kovači	9	(1)
- * Club domestic league appearances and goals as of 18 January 2018

Ivan Petrović (Serbian Cyrillic: Иван Петровић; born 5 October 1978) is a Serbian retired footballer who played as a midfielder. He is a president of Apolon football academy which corresponds as the youth team of OFK Radnički and also based in Kovači.

== Club career ==
Born in Kraljevo, Petrović played with local club Sloga at the beginning of career. Later he played with Partizan, Milicionar and Čukarički until 2004, when he signed with joined OFK Beograd. After he left the club, Petrović moved to Nanjing, where he spent some period playing with local club. Petrović also played with Ethnikos Achna between 2007 and 2011. In summer 2011, he returned to OFK Beograd, where he ended his professional career. After he ended his professional career, Petrović returned to his home town and joined OFK Radnički Kovači.

Petrović is also one of founders of FC Apolon, which organized as an academy of OFK Radnički Kovači. At the beginning of 2016, Petrović was elected as a president of football association of Kraljevo.

In the first half of 2016–17 season, Petrović also made 1 appearance for Radnički Kovači in the Morava Zone League. He was substituted in during the fifth fixture match against Tutin, and later scored a goal from direct free kick for 2–0 victory. He also made 8 appearances for the team in second half-season as the most experienced midfielder in front of Dejan Radosavljević and Milutin Trnavac.
