= Miloš Stanković =

Serbian footballer

Personal information
- Full name: Miloš Stanković
- Date of birth: 22 July 1992 (age 34)
- Place of birth: Vlasotince, FR Yugoslavia
- Height: 1.69 m (5 ft 7 in)
- Position: Forward

Team information
- Current team: Srbija Mannheim
- Number: 7

Senior career*
Years	Team	Apps	(Gls)
2010–2011	Vlasina		
2011–2014	OFK Beograd	0	(0)
2011–2012	→ Bačka Topola (loan)	26	(5)
2012–2013	→ Timok (loan)	41	(7)
2014	→ Sloga Petrovac (loan)	12	(0)
2014–2015	Moravac Mrštane	28	(4)
2015–2018	Radnik Surdulica	78	(8)
2018	Voždovac	7	(0)
2018–2019	Radnik Surdulica	0	(0)
2020–2021	Dubočica		
2021–2022	VfR Mannheim	18	(3)
2022–	Srbija Mannheim	62	(40)
- * Club domestic league appearances and goals as of 25 June 2025

Miloš Stanković (Serbian Cyrillic: Милош Станковић; born 22 July 1992) is a Serbian footballer. He can play on many positions in attack, and also as an attacking midfielder or winger. His twin brother Dušan is also footballer, and performs as a right-back.

== Career ==
Miloš started career in Vlasina, but later he moved in OFK Beograd, together with his twin brother Dušan. They were members of the team from Karaburma from 2011 to 2014, but without official caps for the first team. In the meantime, twins were loaned to Bačka Topola, Timok, and Sloga Petrovac. They also moved together in Moravac Mrštane for the 2014–15 season, but Dušan left the club after first half of season. Although Moravac was relegated from the Serbian First League, Stanković was one of the best in team, and he joined Serbian SuperLiga club Radnik Surdulica in summer 2015.

== Career statistics ==
As of 14 December 2016

Club performance			League		Cup		Continental		Total	
Season	Club	League	Apps	Goals	Apps	Goals	Apps	Goals	Apps	Goals
2011–12	Bačka Topola	Serbian League Vojvodina	26	5	0	0	0	0	26	5
2012–13	Timok	Serbian First League	30	5	1	0	0	0	31	5
2013–14	Timok	Serbian First League	11	2	0	0	0	0	11	2
2013–14	Sloga Petrovac	Serbian First League	12	0	0	0	0	0	12	0
2014–15	Moravac Mrštane	Serbian First League	28	4	1	0	0	0	29	4
2015–16	Radnik Surdulica	Serbian SuperLiga	29	4	0	0	0	0	29	4
2016–17	Radnik Surdulica	Serbian SuperLiga	16	0	1	0	0	0	0	17
Career total			152	20	3	0	0	0	155	20
