= Miroslav Vukašinović =

Serbian football manager and player

Personal information
- Date of birth: 29 August 1948 (age 78)
- Place of birth: Užička Požega, PR Serbia, FPR Yugoslavia
- Position: Midfielder

Youth career
- Sloga Užička Požega

Senior career*
| Years | Team | Apps | (Gls) |
| 1966–1971 | Sloboda Titovo Užice | 96 | (9) |
| 1971–1977 | Vojvodina | 111 | (4) |
| 1977–1981 | LASK | 76+ | (11+) |
| Total | | 283+ | (24+) |

Managerial career
- Slavija Novi Sad
- 1986–1988: Novi Sad
- 1988–1989: El Salvador
- 1991: Sloboda Užice
- Kastoria
- 1996–1997: Hajduk Kula
- 1997–1998: Sartid Smederevo
- 1998–2000: Hajduk Kula
- 2001–2002: Čukarički
- 2002–2003: Vojvodina
- 2004: Budućnost Banatski Dvor
- 2005–2006: ČSK Čelarevo
- 2007: Voždovac
- 2007: Srem
- 2007–2008: Hajduk Kula
- * Club domestic league appearances and goals

Miroslav Vukašinović (Serbian Cyrillic: Мирослав Вукашиновић; born 29 August 1948) is a Serbian former football manager and player.

== Playing career ==
Born in Užička Požega, Vukašinović started out at his hometown club Sloga. He subsequently played for Sloboda Titovo Užice, before joining Vojvodina in 1971. Over the next six seasons, Vukašinović amassed over 100 appearances in the Yugoslav First League. He was also a member of the team that won the Mitropa Cup in 1977. After moving abroad that summer, Vukašinović played for two Austrian clubs, LASK and Wiener Sport-Club.

== Managerial career ==
In the late 1980s, Vukašinović was manager of the El Salvador national team, succeeding his compatriot Milovan Đorić. He later spent some time in Greece and Kuwait, before going on to manage a number of clubs in his homeland, including Hajduk Kula (two spells), Sartid Smederevo (1997–98), Čukarički (2001–02), Vojvodina (2002–03), and ČSK Čelarevo (2005–06). Subsequently, Vukašinović served as manager of Voždovac for two months, before stepping down in April 2007. He was also briefly in charge of Srem, before being hired by his former club Hajduk Kula for a third time in November 2007. In May 2008, Vukašinović announced his decision to retire at the end of the season, citing his dissatisfaction with the overall state of Serbian football as the main reason.

== Honours ==
Vojvodina

- Mitropa Cup: 1976–77
