= József Schaller =

Hungarian footballer

Personal information
- Date of birth: 17 December 1894
- Place of birth: Austria-Hungary
- Date of death: 1 January 1927 (aged 32)
- Position: Forward

Senior career*
| Years | Team | Apps | (Gls) |
| 1919–1924 | Újpest FC | 79 | (33) |
| 1924–1925 | KAFK Kula | | |
| 1926–1927 | Újpest FC | 21 | (10) |

International career
| 1919–1922 | Hungary | 3 | (0) |
- * Club domestic league appearances and goals

József Schaller (17 December 1894 – 1927) was a Hungarian footballer.

He played with Újpest FC in the Hungarian championship and in 1924 he moved abroad to Yugoslavia and joined KAFK Kula. While playing with KAFK he played for the team of Subotica Football Subassociation in the 1924 Yugoslav Cup. By 1926 he was back in Hungary playing with Újpest FC.

He made 3 appearances for the Hungary national team between 1919 and 1922.

He died in a motorcycle accident in 1927.
