= Gavro Bagić =

Croatian footballer

Personal information
- Date of birth: 2 May 1985 (age 41)
- Place of birth: Uglješ, SFR Yugoslavia
- Position: Forward

Youth career
- Osijek

Senior career*
Years	Team	Apps	(Gls)
2003–2010	Metalac Osijek		
2010	Hajduk Kula	1	(0)
2011	Karlovac		
2011–2012	Metalac Osijek		
2012–2013	Osijek	6	(0)
2013–?	Metalac Osijek		
- * Club domestic league appearances and goals

Gavro Bagić (born 2 May 1985) is a Croatian former professional football who played as a forward.

== Career ==
Born in Uglješ, SR Croatia, back in Yugoslavia, Gavro Bagić spent most of his career playing with Metalac Osijek. He started playing in the academy of Osijek and when he finished his period as youth player he was to move to Belgrade to join Serbian side FK Voždovac but by the insistence of his father he stayed in Osijek and joined lower-level Metalac, where he will play for most of the following decade. He became a prolific goalscorer, and his skills did not pass unnoticed even across the border in Serbia where, by that time a stable SuperLiga side Hajduk Kula, brought him to their team in summer 2010. As a young foreign newcomer, Bagić had it hard to break into the starting line-up, so he ended up leaving Hajduk Kula during the winter-break after having made only one appearance in the 2010–11 Serbian SuperLiga. He then had a short spell with NK Karlovac in Croatian Second League before returning to Metalac Osijek. Then in July 2012, he signed with Croatian top-league side and the major club in Slavonia, Osijek. Bagić made six appearances with Osijek in the 2012–13 Croatian First League; however, his reputation of terrific goalscorer, that he brought from the main seasons with Metalac, was pale since he failed to score at all at Croatian highest level. At the end of the season, he returned to the club he became a symbol of, Metalac Osijek, and has revived immediately his goalscoring abilities; by the winter-break, Bagić was the leading goalscorer of the league with 17 goals in 15 games.
