= Danilo Pustinjaković =

Serbian footballer

Personal information
- Full name: Danilo Pustinjaković
- Date of birth: 12 March 1977 (age 49)
- Place of birth: Zrenjanin, SFR Yugoslavia
- Height: 1.88 m (6 ft 2 in)
- Position: Goalkeeper

Youth career
- Proleter Zrenjanin

Senior career*
Years	Team	Apps	(Gls)
1994–2003	Proleter Zrenjanin	70	(0)
2003–2005	Čukarički	33	(0)
2005–2006	Pandurii Târgu Jiu	23	(0)
2006–2008	Banat Zrenjanin	55	(0)
2008–2009	Jagodina	27	(0)
2009	Makedonija Gjorče Petrov	12	(0)
2010	Napredak Kruševac	9	(0)
2010–2011	Novi Pazar	31	(0)
2011–2012	Radnički Kragujevac	0	(0)
2012	Mladost Lučani	7	(0)
2013	Kolubara	1	(0)
2013	Jošanica	14	(0)
2014	Dolina Padina	14	(0)
2016	Begej Žitište		
2017	Polet Idvor		
Total		296	(0)
- * Club domestic league appearances and goals as of 20 June 2017

Danilo Pustinjaković (Serbian Cyrillic: Данило Пустињаковић; born 12 March 1977) is a Serbian retired footballer who played as a goalkeeper.

After starting out at his hometown club Proleter Zrenjanin, Pustinjaković represented numerous domestic and international sides, including Čukarički, Pandurii Târgu Jiu, Banat Zrenjanin, Jagodina, Makedonija Gjorče Petrov, Napredak Kruševac, Novi Pazar, Radnički Kragujevac, Mladost Lučani, Kolubara, and Dolina Padina.
