= Nenad Mladenović =

Serbian footballer

Personal information
- Full name: Nenad Mladenović
- Date of birth: 13 December 1976 (age 49)
- Place of birth: Kragujevac, SFR Yugoslavia
- Height: 1.85 m (6 ft 1 in)
- Position: Striker

Senior career*
| Years | Team | Apps | (Gls) |
| 1996–1998 | Radnički Svilajnac | | |
| 1998–2000 | Beograd | 33 | (9) |
| 2000–2003 | Obilić | 73 | (26) |
| 2003–2005 | Metalurh Donetsk | 28 | (6) |
| 2005–2006 | Gent | 10 | (0) |
| 2006 | → Deinze (loan) | 12 | (4) |
| 2006–2011 | Smederevo | 92 | (21) |
| 2007 | → Al-Ittihad Tripoli (loan) | | |
| 2010 | → Changsha Ginde (loan) | 12 | (0) |
| 2011 | → Inđija (loan) | 0 | (0) |
| 2011–2012 | Balkan Mirijevo | 16 | (3) |
| 2012 | Sinđelić Beograd | 13 | (3) |

International career
| 2002 | FR Yugoslavia | 1 | (0) |
- * Club domestic league appearances and goals

Nenad Mladenović (Serbian Cyrillic: Ненад Младеновић; born 13 December 1976) is a Serbian former professional footballer who played as a striker.

== Club career ==
Mladenović made a name for himself while playing for Obilić from 2000 to 2003, scoring 26 league goals in 73 appearances. He also played professionally in Ukraine, Belgium, Libya and China.

== International career ==
Mladenović was capped once for the national team of FR Yugoslavia, making his debut on 13 February 2002 in a friendly match against Mexico.

== Statistics ==
| Club | Season | League | |
| Club | Season | Apps | Goals |
|---|---|---|---|
| Obilić | 2000–01 | 25 | 5 |
| Obilić | 2001–02 | 26 | 12 |
| Obilić | 2002–03 | 22 | 9 |
| Obilić | Total | 73 | 26 |
