= Petar Pavlović (footballer, born 1987) =

Serbian footballer

Personal information
- Date of birth: 3 March 1987 (age 39)
- Place of birth: Raška, SFR Yugoslavia
- Height: 1.83 m (6 ft 0 in)
- Position: Right-back

Senior career*
Years	Team	Apps	(Gls)
2005–2011	Metalac Gornji Milanovac	132	(1)
2011–2014	Radnički Kragujevac	77	(0)
2014	Aiginiakos	7	(0)
2015–2016	Novi Pazar	10	(0)
2016–2019	Metalac Gornji Milanovac	30	(0)
2019	Bežanija	7	(0)
Total		263	(1)
- * Club domestic league appearances and goals as of 12:25, 24 May 2019 (UTC)

Petar Pavlović (Serbian Cyrillic: Петар Павловић; born 3 March 1987) is a Serbian retired footballer who last played for FK Bežanija in the Serbian First League.
