= Luka Čančarević =

Serbian footballer

Personal information
- Full name: Luka Čančarević
- Date of birth: 17 June 1984 (age 42)
- Place of birth: Užice, SFR Yugoslavia
- Height: 1.80 m (5 ft 11 in)
- Position: Midfielder

Senior career*
Years	Team	Apps	(Gls)
2002–2004	Sloboda Užice	27	(6)
2004–2009	Beograd	137	(6)
2009–2011	Jagodina	22	(0)
2011–2012	Limhamn Bunkeflo	10	(1)
2012–2015	Jedinstvo Putevi	63	(1)
2015	Sloboda Užice	10	(0)
- * Club domestic league appearances and goals as of 23 May 2015

Luka Čančarević (Serbian Cyrillic: Лука Чанчаревић; born 7 June 1984) is a Serbian retired football midfielder.

== Club career ==
He played in the Serbian SuperLiga for FK Jagodina in the 2009–2010 and 2010–2011 seasons and had a short spell in Sweden.
