= Nikola Bogić =

Serbian footballer (born 1981)

Personal information
- Full name: Nikola Bogić
- Date of birth: 30 June 1981 (age 45)
- Place of birth: Zrenjanin, SFR Yugoslavia
- Height: 1.74 m (5 ft 9 in)
- Position: Midfielder

Senior career*
Years	Team	Apps	(Gls)
1999–2001	Proleter Zrenjanin	39	(0)
2001–2003	Mladost Apatin	53	(2)
2003–2011	Hajduk Kula	213	(2)
2011	Mogren	2	(0)
2012	Smederevo	10	(0)
2013–2016	Banat Zrenjanin	87	(5)
2016–2017	Radnički Zrenjanin	25	(0)
2017–2018	Budućnost Srpska Crnja	0	(0)

International career
2002	FR Yugoslavia U21	1	(0)
- * Club domestic league appearances and goals as of 16 July 2017

Nikola Bogić (Serbian Cyrillic: Никола Богић; born 30 June 1981) is a Serbian retired footballer who played as a midfielder.

== Club career ==
Bogić started out at his hometown club Proleter Zrenjanin, but later moved to Mladost Apatin. He spent two seasons at the club, before switching to Hajduk Kula. In the following eight years, between 2003 and 2011, Bogić made over 200 league appearances for the club.

== International career ==
Bogić represented FR Yugoslavia at under-21 level, appearing in a 1–2 friendly loss away against the Spain U21s in April 2002.

== Statistics ==
Club	Season	League		Cup		Continental		Total	
Club	Season	Apps	Goals	Apps	Goals	Apps	Goals	Apps	Goals
Hajduk Kula	2003–04	27	0			—		27	0
Hajduk Kula	2004–05	19	1			—		19	1
Hajduk Kula	2005–06	28	0			—		28	0
Hajduk Kula	2006–07	29	0			2	0	31	0
Hajduk Kula	2007–08	30	0			4	1	34	1
Hajduk Kula	2008–09	31	0	1	0	—		32	0
Hajduk Kula	2009–10	27	1			—		27	1
Hajduk Kula	2010–11	22	0			—		22	0
Hajduk Kula	Total	213	2	1	0	6	1	220	3
