= Igor Kozoš =

Serbian footballer

Personal information
- Full name: Igor Kozoš
- Date of birth: 4 August 1974 (age 52)
- Place of birth: Titov Vrbas, SR Serbia, SFR Yugoslavia
- Height: 1.70 m (5 ft 7 in)
- Position: Right-back

Senior career*
Years	Team	Apps	(Gls)
1996	Solunac Karađorđevo		
1997	Vojvodina	7	(0)
1998	Hajduk Kula	4	(0)
1998	Mladost Apatin		
1999	Szeged		
1999	Obilić	9	(2)
2000–2001	Hajduk Kula	43	(5)
2002	Hutnik Kraków		
2002–2007	Mladost Apatin	144	(14)
2007–2010	Hajduk Kula	80	(2)
2011	Radnički Bajmok		
2012–2013	Bačka 1901		
2013	Radnički Bajmok		
2014–2015	Bačka 1901		
2016–2017	Bačka Pačir		
2018–2019	Elektrovojvodina		
2020–2021	Udarnik Višnjevac		
2022–2025	Hajduk 1950		
- * Club domestic league appearances and goals

Igor Kozoš (Serbian Cyrillic: Игор Козош; born 4 August 1974) is a Serbian former footballer who played as a right-back.

== Career ==
During his journeyman career, Kozoš played for numerous clubs, having multiple stints with Mladost Apatin and Hajduk Kula. He also spent some time abroad in Hungary (Szeged) and Poland (Hutnik Kraków).
