= Dolac, Kraljevo =

Coordinates: 43°28′N 20°31′E

Dolac Долац (Serbian)
- Village (Selo)
- Interactive map of Dolac
- Country: Serbia
- District: Raška District
- Municipality: Kraljevo

Population (2002)
  - Total: 198
- Time zone: UTC+1 (CET)
  - Summer (DST): UTC+2 (CEST)

Dolac is a village in the municipality of Kraljevo, western-central Serbia. According to the 2002 census, the village has a population of 198 people.
