= Aleksandar Đukić =

Serbian footballer

Personal information
- Full name: Aleksandar Đukić
- Date of birth: 30 November 1980 (age 45)
- Place of birth: Valjevo, SFR Yugoslavia
- Height: 1.90 m (6 ft 3 in)
- Position: Striker

Senior career*
Years	Team	Apps	(Gls)
2001–2004	Budućnost Valjevo	53	(18)
2004–2005	Mladost Lučani	15	(0)
2005–2010	BSK Borča	131	(47)
2008–2009	→ Banat Zrenjanin (loan)	27	(5)
2011	Hajduk Kula	11	(4)
2011–2013	BSK Borča	48	(3)
2013	Kolubara	10	(0)
2014	Čelik Nikšić	10	(1)
2015–2016	Mačva Šabac	38	(8)
Total		343	(86)
- * Club domestic league appearances and goals as of 5 July 2018

Aleksandar Đukić (Serbian Cyrillic: Александар Ђукић; also transliterated Djukić; born 30 November 1980) is a Serbian retired footballer who played as a striker. He is best remembered for his time at BSK Borča, scoring 50 league goals in almost 200 appearances for the side.

== Honours ==
BSK Borča

- Serbian League Belgrade: 2005–06

Mačva Šabac

- Serbian League West: 2015–16
