= Uglješ =

- Village (Selo)
- Location within Osijek-Baranja County Location within Croatia
- Country: Croatia
- County: Osijek-Baranja
- Municipality: Darda Municipality

Area
  - Total: 5.2 km^{2} (2.0 sq mi)

Population (2021)
  - Total: 385
  - Density: 74/km^{2} (190/sq mi)

Uglješ (Hungarian: Ölyves; Serbian Cyrillic: Угљеш) is a settlement in the region of Baranja, Croatia. Administratively, it is located in the Darda municipality within the Osijek-Baranja County. The population of the entire settlement is 507 (2011).

== See also ==
- Osijek-Baranja County
- Baranja
