= Marko Jakšić (footballer, born 1983) =

Serbian footballer

Personal information
- Full name: Marko Jakšić
- Date of birth: 10 August 1983 (age 43)
- Place of birth: Belgrade, SFR Yugoslavia
- Height: 1.85 m (6 ft 1 in)
- Position: Forward

Team information
- Current team: Čukarički (manager)

Senior career*
Years	Team	Apps	(Gls)
2001–2004	Radnički Beograd	16	(3)
2004	→ Dorćol (loan)	13	(4)
2004–2005	Borac Čačak	23	(3)
2005–2006	Rad	4	(0)
2006–2007	Radnički Pirot	16	(1)
2007	→ Železničar Beograd (loan)	13	(5)
2007–2008	Zemun	8	(0)
2008–2009	Al Shabab		
2010	Metalac Gornji Milanovac	8	(1)
2010–2011	Ružomberok	10	(0)
2012	OPS	19	(4)
2013	Timok	13	(4)
2014	Bežanija	14	(4)
2014	Sloboda Užice	15	(2)
2015	Radnik Surdulica	10	(1)
2015	Drina Zvornik	17	(7)
2016	Zemun	12	(2)
Total		221	(41)

Managerial career
- 2020-2022: Rad (youth)
- 2022–2024: IMT (assistant)
- 2024: Radnik Surdulica (assistant)
- 2024–2026: Radnik Surdulica
- 2026–: Čukarički
- * Club domestic league appearances and goals

Marko Jakšić (Serbian Cyrillic: Марко Јакшић; born 10 August 1983) is a Serbian retired footballer who played as a forward and current manager of Čukarički.

== Managerial statistics ==
As of 10 Oktobar 2026

Managerial record by team and tenure
Team	From	To	Record				
Team	From	To	G	W	D	L	Win %
Radnik Surdulica	23 November 2024	10 March 2026	50	27	9	14	54.00
Čukarički	13 March 2026	Present	20	4	10	6	20.00
Total			70	31	19	20	44.29

== Honours ==
Radnik Surdulica

- Serbian First League: 2014–15
