= Nikola Stijaković =

Bosnian Serb footballer

Personal information
- Full name: Nikola Stijaković
- Date of birth: 10 March 1989 (age 37)
- Place of birth: Sarajevo, SFR Yugoslavia
- Height: 1.95 m (6 ft 5 in)
- Position: Goalkeeper

Senior career*
Years	Team	Apps	(Gls)
2007–2008	Obilić	17	(0)
2008–2009	Palilulac Beograd	18	(0)
2009–2011	BSK Borča	1	(0)
2011–2013	Spartak Subotica	3	(0)
2013–2014	Zvijezda Gradačac	19	(0)
2014–2015	MFK Košice	17	(0)
Total		75	(0)
- * Club domestic league appearances and goals as of 9 September 2015

Nikola Stijaković (Serbian Cyrillic: Никола Стијаковић; born 10 March 1989) is a Bosnian Serb retired football goalkeeper.

== External sources ==
- Profile at Srbijafudbal
- Nikola Stijaković at Utakmica.rs (in Serbian)
