= Kovači, Kraljevo =

Coordinates: 43°41′N 20°40′E

Kovači Ковачи (Serbian)
- Settlement (Naselje)
- Interactive map of Kovači
- Country: Serbia
- District: Raška District
- Municipality: Kraljevo
- Elevation: 850 ft (259 m)

Population (2011)
  - Total: 1,255
- Time zone: UTC+1 (CET)
  - Summer (DST): UTC+2 (CEST)

Kovači is an urban settlement situated in the city of Kraljevo in Serbia. Its population is 1,255, according to the 2011 Census in Serbia.

== Demography ==
This village is mostly inhabited by Serbs according to the 2002 Census in Serbia. There is also 1 Macedonian and 1 Ukrainian living in Kovači.

There are 1,031 adult residents living in Kovači, and the average age of the population is 37.9 years. There are 402 households in the settlement, and the average number of members per household is 3.23.

Year	Population
1948	352
1953	397
1961	711
1971	1,858
1981	880
1991	950
