= Banfa Sylla =

French footballer (born 1989)

Personal information
- Full name: Banfa Sylla
- Date of birth: 29 May 1989 (age 37)
- Place of birth: Paris, France
- Height: 1.90 m (6 ft 3 in)
- Position: Defender

Senior career*
| Years | Team | Apps | (Gls) |
| 2007–2010 | Vannes B | | |
| 2010–2011 | Lorca Atlético | 1 | (0) |
| 2011–2012 | Rad | 1 | (0) |
| 2013 | ASV Durlach | | |
- * Club domestic league appearances and goals

Banfa Sylla (born 29 May 1989) is a French football defender.

== Career ==
He played with Vannes OC in France between 2007 and 2010. He moved to Lorca Atlético CF and played in the Spanish Segunda División B during the 2010–11 season. In summer 2011 he moved to Serbia and signed with FK Rad. He made his debut in the SuperLiga in a match against FK Novi Pazar in which he was a used substitute. In April 2013 he joined German club ASV Durlach.

== Personal ==
Born in the French capital, Paris, Sylla has also Senegalese descent.
