= Igor Dimitrijević =

Serbian footballer

Personal information
- Full name: Igor Dimitrijević
- Date of birth: 13 August 1992 (age 34)
- Place of birth: Jagodina, FR Yugoslavia
- Height: 1.74 m (5 ft 8 1/2 in)
- Position: Forward

Youth career
- Jagodina

Senior career*
Years	Team	Apps	(Gls)
2009–2010	Jagodina	1	(0)
2011	Mladost Lučani	3	(1)
2011	Sloga Despotovac	7	(1)
2012	Trgovački Jagodina	13	(7)
2012–2014	Jagodina	0	(0)
2013	→ Trgovački Jagodina (loan)	12	(5)
2013–2014	→ OFK Tabane Trgovački (loan)	21	(1)
2014–2016	Sloga Despotovac	46	(17)
2016	OFK Tabane Trgovački	14	(7)
2017–2018	Jagodina	13	(1)
2018	→ Tabane Trgovački (loan)		
2018–2019	Rudar Trbovlje		
2019–2020	Zarica Kranj		
2020–2021	Svilajnac		
- * Club domestic league appearances and goals as of 1 January 2018

Igor Dimitrijević (Serbian Cyrillic: Игор Димитријевић; born 13 August 1992) is a Serbian football forward.

== Career ==
He had started in Jagodina, and had one appearance for team in season 2008–09, as a player of youth school. He left to Lučani, because in that time were a lot of players on attacking positions in team of Jagodina. After that, he moved to Sloga Despotovac, and later in Trgovački Jagodina. He was one of the lead players to existence of Trgovački in Serbian League. He returned to Jagodina, but didn't play, and he forward to Trgovački again, on loan this time. For second half of season 2012–13, he scored 5 goals on 12 appearances, for Trgovački.
