= Miloš Radosavljević (footballer) =

Serbian footballer

Personal information
- Date of birth: 20 May 1988 (age 38)
- Place of birth: Smederevo, SFR Yugoslavia
- Height: 1.87 m (6 ft 1 1/2 in)
- Position: Midfielder

Youth career
- Smederevo

Senior career*
Years	Team	Apps	(Gls)
2008–2011	Smederevo	29	(0)
2006–2007	→ Železničar Smederevo (loan)		
2007–2008	→ Mladi Radnik (loan)	26	(0)
2011–2012	Viktoria Zizkov	0	(0)
2012	Arka Gdynia	3	(0)
2012–2015	Smederevo	29	(2)
2016–2017	Turbina Vreoci		
2017–2020	FK Brezovica		
- * Club domestic league appearances and goals

Miloš Radosavljević (born 20 May 1988) is a Serbian footballer who plays as a midfielder.
