= Miloš Malović =

Serbian footballer

Personal information
- Full name: Miloš Malović
- Date of birth: 1 April 1989 (age 37)
- Place of birth: Belgrade, SFR Yugoslavia
- Height: 1.80 m (5 ft 11 in)
- Position: Defender

Senior career*
Years	Team	Apps	(Gls)
2007–2011	Red Star Belgrade	0	(0)
2007–2008	→ Sopot (loan)	19	(1)
2008–2009	→ Srem (loan)	18	(0)
2009–2010	→ Sopot (loan)	18	(0)
2011	→ Napredak Kruševac (loan)	7	(0)
2012	Mladenovac	12	(0)
2012–2015	Zemun	36	(0)
- * Club domestic league appearances and goals as of 1 August 2014 ‡ National team caps and goals as of 1 August 2014

Miloš Malović (Serbian Cyrillic: Милош Маловић; born 1 April 1989) is a Serbian football defender.

Born in Belgrade, Serbian capital, he started playing in the youth team of the powerhouse Red Star Belgrade. Between 2007 and 2011 he spent most of the time on loans, first at Red Stars farm team FK Sopot, and later in second level sides FK Srem and FK Napredak Kruševac. In summer 2012 he joined FK Zemun, coming from OFK Mladenovac where he spent the previous half season.
