= Nikola Vasiljević (Serbian footballer, born 1983) =

Serbian footballer

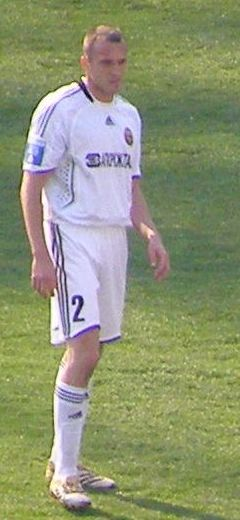
- Vasiljević with Metalurh Zaporizhya in 2009

Personal information
- Full name: Nikola Vasiljević
- Date of birth: 19 December 1983 (age 42)
- Place of birth: Belgrade, SFR Yugoslavia
- Height: 1.85 m (6 ft 1 in)

Senior career*
Years	Team	Apps	(Gls)
2003	BSK Borča	10	(0)
2004	PKB Padinska Skela	3	(0)
2004–2005	Radnički Obrenovac	9	(0)
2005	Radnički Beograd	9	(1)
2006	Radnički Pirot	15	(1)
2006–2008	UTA Arad	35	(0)
2009	Metalurh Zaporizhzhia	5	(0)
2009–2011	Red Star Belgrade	6	(0)
2011	→ BSK Borča (loan)	4	(0)
2011–2012	Srem	24	(1)
2012–2013	Borac Banja Luka	22	(0)
2013	Voždovac	5	(0)
2014	Leotar	5	(0)
2014–2017	Brodarac 1947	47	(0)
2017–2018	Radnički Beograd	13	(0)
- * Club domestic league appearances and goals

Nikola Vasiljević (Serbian Cyrillic: Никола Васиљевић; born 19 December 1983) is a Serbian retired footballer who played as a defender.

== Honours ==
Red Star Belgrade

- Serbian Cup: 2009–10
