= Dragiša Pejović =

Serbian footballer

Personal information
- Full name: Dragiša Pejović
- Date of birth: 31 July 1982 (age 44)
- Place of birth: Kragujevac, SR Serbia, SFR Yugoslavia
- Height: 1.73 m (5 ft 8 in)
- Position: Left-back

Senior career*
Years	Team	Apps	(Gls)
2001–2003	Bane	47	(3)
2003–2010	Borac Čačak	119	(0)
2004	→ Remont Čačak (loan)	4	(0)
2008	→ Novi Pazar (loan)	15	(0)
2011	Novi Pazar	10	(0)
2011–2012	Bane		
2012	Radnički Nova Pazova	13	(0)
- * Club domestic league appearances and goals

Dragiša Pejović (Serbian Cyrillic: Драгиша Пејовић; born 31 July 1982) is a Serbian former professional footballer who played as a defender.

== Career ==
After starting out at Bane, Pejović spent most of his career at Borac Čačak, making 119 appearances for the side in the top flight between 2003 and 2010. He parted ways with the club on bad terms, receiving international media attention after accusing them of match-fixing.
