= Dušan Stanković =

Serbian basketball player

Priboj
- Position: Power forward
- League: First Regional League of Serbia

Personal information
- Born: February 12, 1994 (age 32) Belgrade, Serbia, Yugoslavia
- Listed height: 2.02 m (6 ft 8 in)

Career information
- NBA draft: 2013: undrafted
- Playing career: 2010–present

Career history
- 2011-2012: Mega Vizura
- 2013–2014: OKK Beograd
- 2014: Tuři Svitavy
- 2014–2016: OKK Beograd
- 2016: Strumica
- 2017–2018: OKK Beograd
- 2018–2019: Mladost Mrkonjić Grad
- 2019–present: KK Priboj

Dušan Stanković (Serbian Cyrillic: Душан Станковић, born 12 February 1994) is a Serbian professional basketball player for KK Priboj of the First Regional League of Serbia.
