= Bojan Živković =

Serbian footballer

Personal information
- Full name: Bojan Živković
- Date of birth: 10 November 1981 (age 45)
- Place of birth: Gornji Milanovac, SFR Yugoslavia
- Height: 1.88 m (6 ft 2 in)
- Position: Attacking midfielder

Team information
- Current team: Polet Ljubić

Senior career*
Years	Team	Apps	(Gls)
2001–2006	Borac Čačak	33	(4)
2004–2005	→ Remont Čačak (loan)		
2007–2008	→ Metalac Gornji Milanovac (loan)	31	(3)
2006–2008	Metalac Gornji Milanovac	57	(5)
2008–2011	Jagodina	63	(3)
2011	→ Mladost Lučani (loan)	15	(0)
2011–2013	Metalac Gornji Milanovac	53	(4)
2014	Polet Ljubić	10	(0)
2014-2016	Karađorđe Topola		
2017	Šumadija Aranđelovac		
2017-2020	Takovo		
- * Club domestic league appearances and goals as of 28 July 2014

Bojan Živković (Serbian Cyrillic: Бојан Живковић; born 10 November 1981) is a Serbian retired football midfielder.
