= Nenad Višnjić =

Serbian footballer

Personal information
- Full name: Nenad Višnjić
- Date of birth: 25 April 1983 (age 43)
- Place of birth: Belgrade, SFR Yugoslavia
- Height: 1.86 m (6 ft 1 in)
- Position: Defender

Senior career*
Years	Team	Apps	(Gls)
2001–2002	Komgrap		
2002–2009	Čukarički	151	(7)
2009	Budućnost Podgorica	6	(0)
2010	Čukarički	19	(1)
2011–2012	Borac Čačak	12	(2)
Total		188	(10)
- * Club domestic league appearances and goals

Nenad Višnjić (Serbian Cyrillic: Ненад Вишњић; born 25 April 1983) is a Serbian football defender.

== Career ==
He spent most of his career playing with FK Čukarički with whom he played almost for a decade counting over 150 league matches. During the 2009–10 season he spent the first half season playing with FK Budućnost Podgorica in the Montenegrin First League before returning to Čukarički. During the winter break of the 2010–11 season he moved to another SuperLiga club, FK Borac Čačak. He plays as central defender.

== Honours ==
Budućnost Podgorica

- Montenegrin Cup: 2009–10
