= FK Jedinstvo Donja Mutnica =

Jedinstvo DM
- Full name: Omladinski Fudbalski Klub Jedinstvo
- Founded: 1947; 79 years ago
- Dissolved: 2024; 2 years ago
Home colours	Away colours

OFK Jedinstvo was a Serbian football club based in Donja Mutnica, Serbia. It had different names over the years, with FK Donja Mutnica being the most recent since 2016.
