= Ivan Paunović =

Serbian footballer

Personal information
- Full name: Ivan Paunović
- Date of birth: 17 June 1986 (age 40)
- Place of birth: Užice, SFR Yugoslavia
- Height: 1.86 m (6 ft 1 in)
- Position: Midfielder

Senior career*
Years	Team	Apps	(Gls)
2003–2004	Sartid Smederevo	0	(0)
2004–2005	Sloga Požega	23	(3)
2005–2006	Vujić Voda	3	(0)
2006	→ Sloboda Užice (loan)	13	(2)
2006–2007	Mladi Radnik	16	(5)
2007	→ Voždovac (loan)	11	(2)
2007–2009	Voždovac	53	(1)
2009	Srem	9	(0)
2010	Universitatea Craiova	2	(0)
2010–2011	Metalac GM	4	(0)
2011	→ Novi Pazar (loan)	15	(1)
2011–2012	OFK Mladenovac	10	(0)
2012	Sloga Požega		
2012–2013	Javor Ivanjica		
2013–2014	Sloga Požega		
2014–2015	Železničar Lajkovac		
2015–2017	Crnokosa Kosjerić		
2018–2020	Budućnost Arilje		
- * Club domestic league appearances and goals as of 30 March 2011

Ivan Paunović (Serbian Cyrillic: Иван Пауновић; born 17 June 1986) is a Serbian retired football midfielder.

He signed his first contract in 2003 with Sartid Smederevo playing back then in the First League of Serbia and Montenegro. Still young and after not getting any chance to play in the league during that year, he decided to continue his career in lower league clubs such as Sloga Požega, Vujić Voda and FK Sloboda Užice. In summer 2006 he moved to FK Mladi Radnik and after a good first half of the season, he spent the next six months on loan with Voždovac playing then in the 2006–07 Serbian SuperLiga. Unfortunately Voždovac ended the seasons relegated, but Paunović impressed and the club signed him and he will end up playing two more seasons with them. In 2009, he moved to Srem Sremska Mitrovica and after six months Romanian Liga I club Universitatea Craiova signed him. After not getting many chances he decided to return to Serbia and in summer 2010 he signed with Metalac Gornji Milanovac playing in the SuperLiga. In winter break of 2010-11 he was loaned to FK Novi Pazar to help the club to reach its ambitions to end the season promoted to the SuperLiga for its first time.
