= Vladimir Savićević (Serbian footballer) =

Serbian footballer

Personal information
- Full name: Vladimir Savićević
- Date of birth: 12 May 1986 (age 40)
- Place of birth: Kraljevo, SFR Yugoslavia
- Height: 1.79 m (5 ft 10 in)
- Position: Striker

Youth career
- Sloga Kraljevo

Senior career*
| Years | Team | Apps | (Gls) |
| 2003–2006 | Mladost Lučani | 42 | (7) |
| 2006–2009 | Srem | 95 | (24) |
| 2009–2011 | Metalac Gornji Milanovac | 25 | (1) |
| 2011 | Kolubara | 12 | (0) |
| 2012–2014 | Altheim | 60 | (41) |
| 2014 | Union Gurten | 11 | (2) |
| 2015 | Altheim | 13 | (7) |
| 2015-2016 | Radnički Sremska Mitrovica | | |
| Total | | 258 | (82) |
- * Club domestic league appearances and goals as of 14 June 2015

Vladimir Savićević (Serbian Cyrillic: Владимир Савићевић; born 12 May 1986) is a Serbian retired footballer who played as a striker.

He spent a couple of seasons in the Austrian third and fourth tiers.
