= FK Hajduk Kula =

Hajduk Kula
- Full name: Fudbalski Klub Hajduk Kula
- Nickname: Hajduci (The Outlaws)
- Founded: 1925; 101 years ago
- Dissolved: 2013
- Ground: Stadion Milan Sredanović
- Capacity: 5,973
Home colours	Away colours

FK Hajduk Kula (Serbian Cyrillic: ФК Хајдук Кула) was a Serbian football club based in Kula. The club was named after a Hajduk, a much celebrated hero figure in the Serbian epic poetry. On 30 July 2013, just eleven days before the start of the new season, it was announced that the club had resigned from the SuperLiga and dissolved its first team due to financial problems, while the youth teams continue to participate in competitions in the club's successor OFK Hajduk.

It was planned that the first new OFK Hajduk team would start in the 2014–15 season in the 3rd League. OFK Hajduk is using FK Hajduk's symbols stadium, auxiliary fields, and has complete FK Hajduk's management, youth squads and PR service. In August 2013, a group of citizens founded a separate football club called is FK Hajduk Kula 1925, which registered in March 2014.

In summer 2015, the club residence moved to Novi Sad.

Beside the story of the former club, a club named Hajduk Junior had also founded in Kula and started playing competitive matches since summer 2015. In the mid of the 2017–18 season, the club replaced OFK Odžaci in the Serbian League Vojvodina, and formally played under the name of that club until the end of season. The club also uses Stadion Milan Sredanović as a home ground.

== History ==
=== Beginning: KAFK ===
The first registered football club in Kula was the KAFK (Kulski atletski fudbalski klub, Kula athletic football club) in 1912. In 1920, already within the Kingdom of Serbs, Croats and Slovenes, the club is incorporated in the league of the sub-association of Subotica. Ferenc Plattkó was the coach and one of the most notable player from that period. In 1925, a fraction of the club is named SK Hajduk (Sportski klub Hajduk, Sports club Hajduk) and in 1926 what was left of KAFK becomes Radnički which will be renamed in 1938 to JSK (Jugoslovenski sportski klub, Yugoslavian sport club). During the 1930s, the club never archived the level from the earlier decade and by the beginning of the Second World War it was disbanded.

=== SK Hajduk ===
SK Hajduk played its first match in 1925 against SK Rusin from Ruski Krstur. In opposition to KAFK which was mostly formed and supported by the local German community, Hajduk was known for his multi-cultural element. The club started competing in the third league of the Subotica sub-association and progressively achieved promotions, in 1929 to the second, and 1933 to the first league of Subotica sub-association. With the beginning of the Second World War and the subsequent occupation of the Kingdom of Yugoslavia, the club is disbanded in 1941 by the German authorities. Still during the war, the club was allowed to restore activities however with the condition of changing the name, so it existed as Ifjusag (meaning Youth in Hungarian) but only played friendly matches against neighbouring local teams. A number of club officials, players and supporters joined resistance against the Axis occupation and died during the war.

=== 1945–1991 ===
After the war the club competes locally under several different names, Udarnik, Bratstvo-Jedinstvo and Jedinstvo, restoring the old name only in 1949. It was that same year that Hajduk achieved promotion to the regional Vojvodina League. It is in this period that the handball, volleyball, boxing, bowling, tennis, and other sections, are created within the club. In 1955–56, it finishes top achieving promotion to the III Zone which was one of the 5 subdivisions of the Yugoslav Second League. In the first season in this rang the club finished 5th. After some league restructuring Hajduk will achieve promotion to the Yugoslav Second League North in 1970 in their third consecutive attempt. The club stayed in this level 3 seasons after which it was relegated to the regional Vojvodina League where it will play during the following 15 years, with exception of the period 1983–85 when it played in the Bačka zone league. The clubs ascension begins in the 1988–89 season when they fail promotion to the Yugoslav Third League in the last round. However, they will achieve the promotion a year later by finishing top in their league. In the next season they finish third and achieve promotion to the Yugoslav Second League. This period will be crowned with the promotion to the 1991–92 Yugoslav First League.

=== 1991–2013 ===
After achieving the promotion to the national top league in 1991, Hajduk will never be relegated until nowadays, a feature archived only by the biggest clubs: Red Star, Partizan and Vojvodina.

In the early 1990s, the club invests in the infrastructure with the building of the necessary sports facilities and a modern stadium. The Yugoslav Wars and the sanctions imposed to FR Yugoslavia made this development more difficult, however the club archived the necessary sport results to become a solid member of the First League of FR Yugoslavia. Major help in this period came from a local company Rodić M&B who became the general sponsor since 1992, and the club changes its name into FK Hajduk Rodić M&B – Kula.

The club becomes an important social player in the region, helping numerous local clubs in difficult times and making numerous humanitarian aid relief activities. A number of club associates participated and helped local Serbian population in Bosnia and Croatia during the wars. At sports level, the club, in its 5th top league season 1996–97, and despite predictions of relegation, achieved their best ever result, as they finished the season 4th. This way they earned a place in the 1997 UEFA Intertoto Cup.

In the following seasons the club stabilized in the middle of the table in the league, and more was invested in the improvement of the infrastructure. Hajduk also created their satellite club, Lipar MB, becoming the only club in the country beside Partizan to have one. A number of club players became notable. The top scorer in the club's history is Dejan Osmanović with 91 goals. He was also the top scorer of the Yugoslav First League in the 1998–99 season. Mirko Radulović has the most appearances in a single season in the club's history with 35 games in the 1995–96 season.

While playing for the club, goalkeeper Nikola Milojević was part of the Serbia and Montenegro U-21 team which won silver at the 2004 UEFA European Under-21 Championship and was also member of the Serbia and Montenegro team at the 2004 Olympics. The most goals scored by the club in a single season was 45 in 2000–01. The largest win in the top league was in 2000 when Hajduk beat Sutjeska Nikšić 6–2.

In 2005, Rodić M&B abandoned its sponsorship becoming just a donor, marking a period of financial recession for the club. The satellite club, which had been renamed POFK Kula earlier, is merged with Radnički Sombor helping this was the Sombor club from being relegated. However, with the sacrifices done by all members of the club, Hajduk finishes the 2005–06 Serbia and Montenegro SuperLiga in 4th place qualifying that way to the 2006–07 UEFA Cup where they were eliminated in the second qualifying round by CSKA Sofia on away goals rule after a 1–1 draw at home.

In the 2006–07 Serbian SuperLiga they finished 5th, and this way earning a spot at the 2007 UEFA Intertoto Cup. In that season the club was coached by Žarko Soldo who marked the club and achieved some memorable results as a win over Partizan by 3–0 with goals of Milan Perić, twice, and Ljubomir Fejsa, the later setting the record transfer between SuperLiga clubs when moved from Hajduk to Partizan by €1.2 million. In the 2007 Intertoto Cup, Hajduk won Slovenian NK Maribor by 5–2 aggregate (5–0, 0–2) but in the finals they lost against Portuguese União de Leiria and failed to qualify to the UEFA Cup.

After a season 2010–11 in which they barely escaped from relegation, the club under a new leadership under the President Zoran Osmajić, started the season 2011–12 with 4 straight wins becoming the unexpected leaders in the 5th round. It was then that two difficult matches came, against current champions Partizan followed by their rivals Red Star, and Hajduk lost both, 0–2 and 0–1 respectively. On 28 September 2011, the former manager Nebojša Vignjević was replaced by Petar Kurćubić.

On 30 July 2013, just eleven days before start of new season it was announced that club resigned from the SuperLiga and dissolved its first team due to financial problems, while the youth teams continue to participate in competitions in OFK Hajduk. It was planned that OFK Hajduk would be the new first team to start in the 2014–15 season in the 3rd League.

== Supporters ==
Hajduk Kula's organized supporters was known as Zulu iz Kulu. This group was founded in the end of the 1980s, but in the spring of 1998, the group broke up. In the spring of 2005, new generation of Hajduk fans tried to renew the group, but without any success. As of 2024 Zulu iz Kulu is active again, supporting Hajduk Kula in solid amount of fans.

== European record ==
Season	Cup	Round	Club	Result
1997–98	Intertoto Cup	Group	(Sweden) Halmstad	0–1
1997–98	Intertoto Cup	Group	(Finland) TPS	2–1
1997–98	Intertoto Cup	Group	(Norway) Kongsvinger	2–0
1997–98	Intertoto Cup	Group	(Belgium) Lommel	2–3
2006–07	UEFA Cup	QR2	(Bulgaria) CSKA Sofia	1–1, 0–0
2007–08	Intertoto Cup	R2	(Slovenia) Maribor	5–0, 0–2
2007–08	Intertoto Cup	R3	(Portugal) União de Leiria	1–0, 1–4

== Notable former players ==
To appear in this section a player must have either:

- Played at least 80 games for the club.
- Set a club record or won an individual award while at the club.
- Played at least one international match for their national team at any time.
- (Bosnia and Herzegovina) Aleksandar Jovanović
- (Bosnia and Herzegovina) Ninoslav Milenković
- (Croatia) Zoran Rajović
- (Hungary) Ferenc Plattkó
- (Hungary) József Schaller
- (Montenegro) Nenad Brnović
- (Montenegro) Filip Kasalica
- (Montenegro) Savo Pavićević
- (Montenegro) Niša Saveljić
- (Montenegro) Zoran Vuksanović
- (Serbia) Zoran Antić
- (Serbia) Nikola Bogić
- (Serbia) Radoš Bulatović
- (Serbia) Ivan Ćirka
- (Serbia) Aleksandar Davidov
- (Serbia) Milan Davidov
- (Serbia) Ranko Delić
- (Serbia) Anđelko Đuričić
- (Serbia) Darko Fejsa
- (Serbia) Ljubomir Fejsa
- (Serbia) Željko Karanović
- (Serbia) Dejan Kekezović
- (Serbia) Nikola Komazec
- (Serbia) Igor Kozoš
- (Serbia) Nikola Malbaša
- (Serbia) Nikola Milojević
- (Serbia) Dragan Mojić
- (Serbia) Dejan Osmanović
- (Serbia) Siniša Radanović
- (Serbia) Dejan Rađenović
- (Serbia) Jovan Radivojević
- (Serbia) Mirko Radulović
- (Serbia) Uroš Stamatović
- (Serbia) Dragan Stojisavljević
- (Serbia) Đorđe Tomić

For the list of all current and former players with Wikipedia article, please see: Category:FK Hajduk Kula players.

== Historical list of coaches ==
This is a list of all Hajduk Kula managers:

- (Serbia) Milan Milanović (Sep 2012 – 2013)
- (Serbia) Veličko Kaplanović (Jun 2012 – Sep 2012)
- (Serbia) Tomislav Sivić (Mar 2012 – 2012)
- (Serbia) Zoltan Sabo (Dec 2011 – Mar 2012)
- (Serbia) Petar Kurćubić (Sep 2011 – Dec 2011)
- (Serbia) Nebojša Vignjević (Jul 2011 – Sep 2011)
- (Serbia) Dragoljub Bekvalac (Sep 2010 – Jun 2011)
- (Croatia) Zdenko Glumac (2010 – Sep 2010)
- (Serbia) Žarko Soldo (Jan 2010 – 2010)
- (Serbia) Bogdan Korak (Jun 2009 – Nov 2009)
- (Serbia) Radmilo Jovanović (2008 – Jun 2009)
- (Serbia) Miroslav Vukašinović (Nov 2007 – Jun 2008)
- (Serbia) Žarko Soldo (2007 – Oct 2007)
- (Serbia) Nebojša Vučićević (Mar 2006 – Dec 2006)
- (Serbia and Montenegro) Dragoljub Bekvalac (Jun 2005 – Mar 2006)
- (Serbia and Montenegro) Boris Bunjak (Jan 2005 – Jun 2005)
- (Serbia and Montenegro) Miloljub Ostojić (Jun 2004 – Dec 2004)
- (Serbia and Montenegro) Momčilo Raičević (Jun 2003 – Jun 2004)
- (Serbia and Montenegro) Miloljub Ostojić (Jun 2002 – Jun 2003)
- (Serbia and Montenegro) Slavenko Kuzeljević (Apr 2000 – Jun 2002)
- (Serbia and Montenegro) Miroslav Vukašinović (Mar 1998 – Apr 2000)
- (Serbia and Montenegro) Nikola Rakojević (Jun 1997 – Mar 1998)
- (Serbia and Montenegro) Miroslav Vukašinović (Jun 1996 – Jun 1997)
- (Serbia and Montenegro) Dragoljub Bekvalac (Oct 1993 – Jun 1996)
- (Bosnia and Herzegovina) Nenad Starovlah (Jun 1992 – Oct 1993)
- (Socialist Federal Republic of Yugoslavia) Milorad Sekulović (Jun 1989 - Jun 1992)
- (Socialist Federal Republic of Yugoslavia) Milan Sredanović
- (Socialist Federal Republic of Yugoslavia) Miloš Cetina
- (Socialist Federal Republic of Yugoslavia) Žarko Bulatović
- (Socialist Federal Republic of Yugoslavia) Joakim Vislavski
- (Socialist Federal Republic of Yugoslavia) Ilija Tojagić
- (Socialist Federal Republic of Yugoslavia) Veliša Popović
- (Socialist Federal Republic of Yugoslavia) Luka Malešev
- (Socialist Federal Republic of Yugoslavia) Đorđe Jovanić
- (Socialist Federal Republic of Yugoslavia) Miodrag Vlaški
- (Socialist Federal Republic of Yugoslavia) Božidar Koloković
- (Socialist Federal Republic of Yugoslavia) Nikola Josić
- (Socialist Federal Republic of Yugoslavia) Đorđe Belogrlić
- (Socialist Federal Republic of Yugoslavia) Edo Plac
- (Socialist Federal Republic of Yugoslavia) Gradimir Bogojevac
- (Socialist Federal Republic of Yugoslavia) Ivan Savković
- (Socialist Federal Republic of Yugoslavia) Vilmoš Gemeri
- (Socialist Federal Republic of Yugoslavia) Mirko Juhas
- (Socialist Federal Republic of Yugoslavia) Stevan Pejčić
- (Hungary) József Treml
- (Socialist Federal Republic of Yugoslavia) Slobodan Anđelković
- (Socialist Federal Republic of Yugoslavia) Petar Rujer
- (Socialist Federal Republic of Yugoslavia) Uroš Ćirić
- (Socialist Federal Republic of Yugoslavia) Gojko Obradov
- (Socialist Federal Republic of Yugoslavia) Sava Prekajac
- (Socialist Federal Republic of Yugoslavia) Stevan Ćirić
- (Socialist Federal Republic of Yugoslavia) Sima Šuvakov
- (Socialist Federal Republic of Yugoslavia) Pera Struklić
- (Hungary) János Katatics
- (Socialist Federal Republic of Yugoslavia) Ljubomir Rankov
- (Hungary) Géza Knefély
- (Socialist Federal Republic of Yugoslavia) Laslo Egeto
- (Hungary) Ferenc Plattkó
- (Socialist Federal Republic of Yugoslavia) Oto Knezi
- (Socialist Federal Republic of Yugoslavia) Jožef Sep
