= List of FK Radnički Niš managers =

FK Radnički Niš is a professional football club based in Niš, Serbia.

== Managers ==
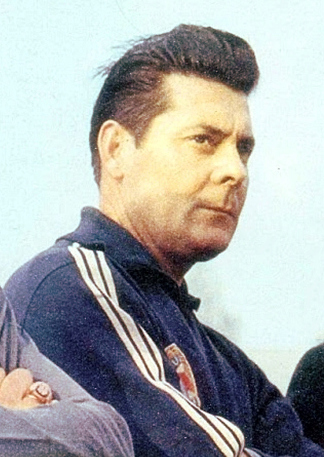
Dušan Nenković

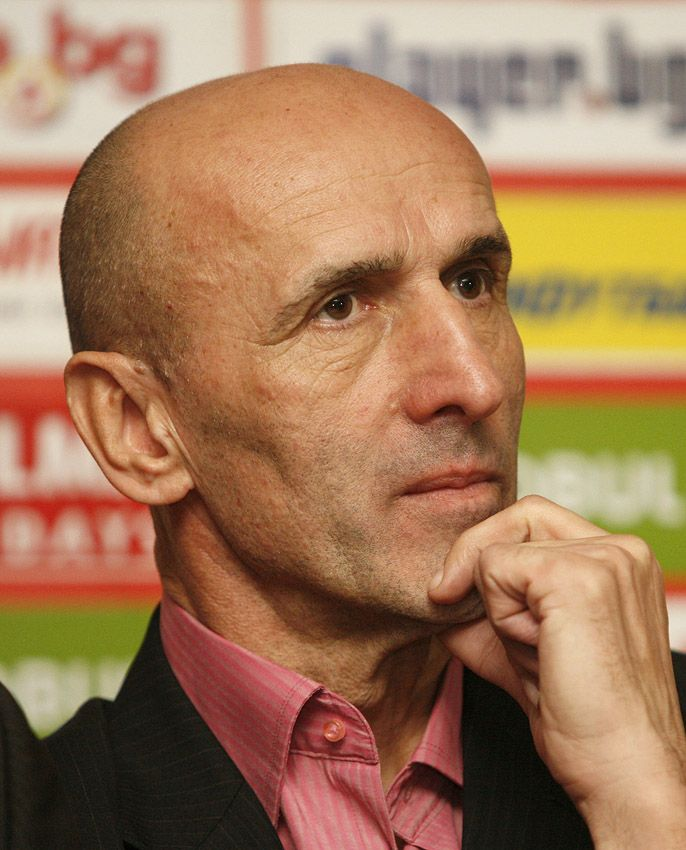
Miodrag Ješić

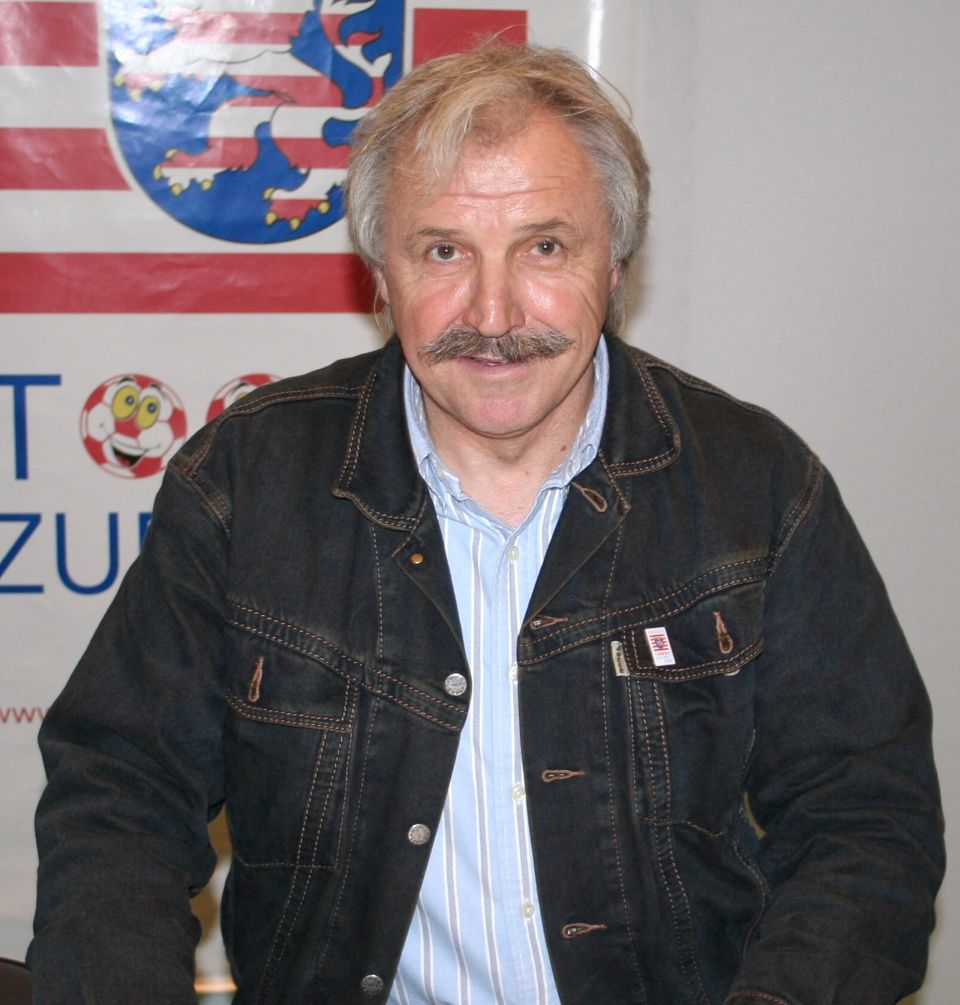
Dragoslav Stepanović

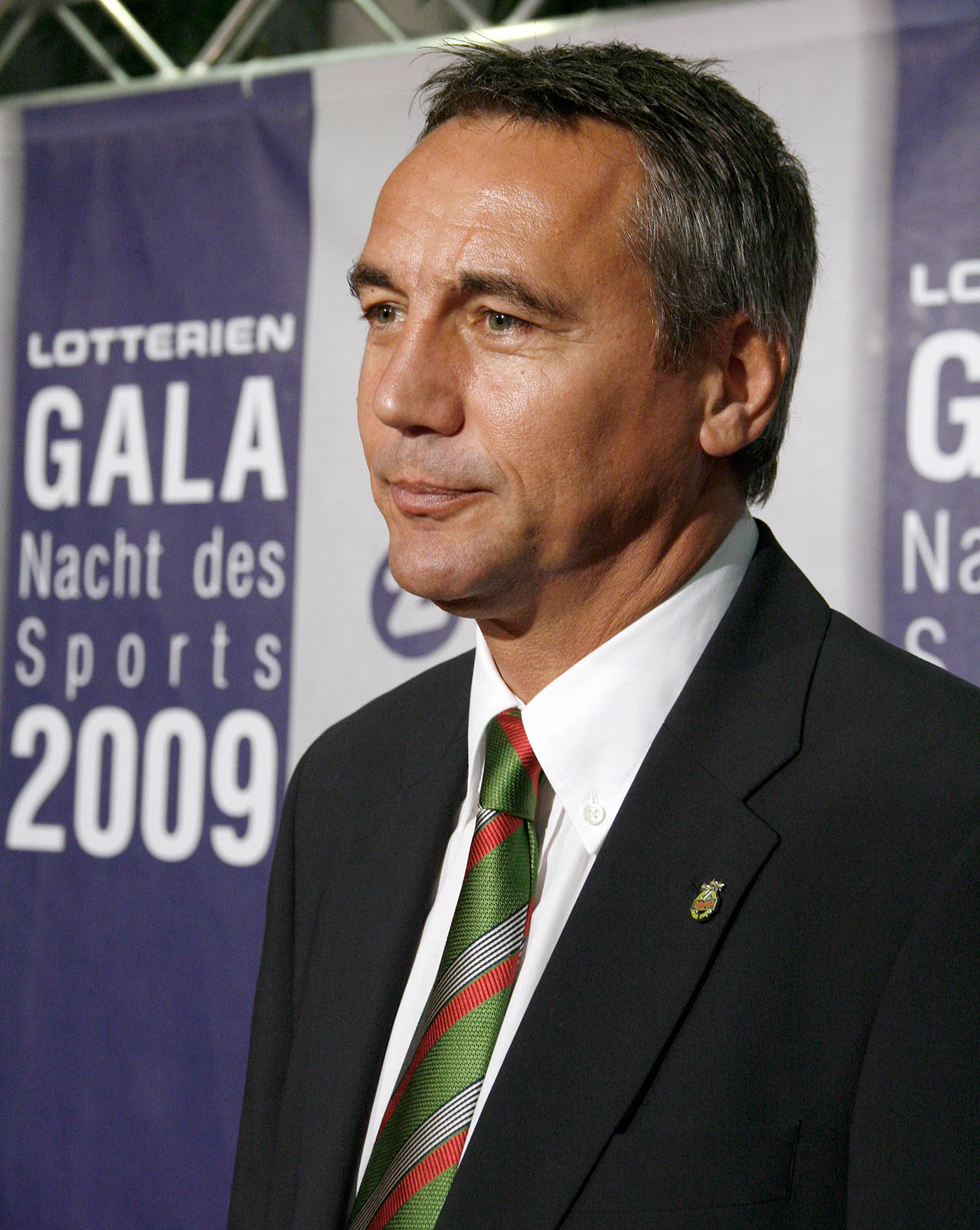
Peter Pacult

| Name | Period | | Pld | W | D | L | Win % | Honours |
| Name | From | To | Pld | W | D | L | Win % | Honours |
|---|---|---|---|---|---|---|---|---|
| (Socialist Federal Republic of Yugoslavia) Dimitrije Guberevac | | | | | | | | |
| (Socialist Federal Republic of Yugoslavia) Miomir Petrović | | | | | | | | |
| (Socialist Federal Republic of Yugoslavia) Janko Zvekanović | | 1961 | | | | | | |
| (Socialist Federal Republic of Yugoslavia) Miroslav Glišović | 1961 | | | | | | | |
| (Socialist Federal Republic of Yugoslavia) Abdulah Gegić | | 1963 | | | | | | |
| (Socialist Federal Republic of Yugoslavia) Dušan Nenković | 1963 | 1965 | | | | | | |
| (Socialist Federal Republic of Yugoslavia) Dragoljub Milošević | 1965 | | | | | | | |
| (Socialist Federal Republic of Yugoslavia) Miroslav Glišović | | 1967 | | | | | | |
| (Socialist Federal Republic of Yugoslavia) Ratomir Čabrić | 1967 | 1968 | | | | | | |
| (Socialist Federal Republic of Yugoslavia) Miroslav Glišović | 1968 | 1971 | | | | | | |
| (Socialist Federal Republic of Yugoslavia) Slavko Videnović | 1971 | 1971 | | | | | | |
| (Socialist Federal Republic of Yugoslavia) Dušan Varagić | 1971 | 1972 | | | | | | |
| (Socialist Federal Republic of Yugoslavia) Miroslav Glišović | 1972 | 1974 | | | | | | |
| (Socialist Federal Republic of Yugoslavia) Đorđe Kačunković | 1974 | 1976 | | | | | | 1975 Balkans Cup |
| (Socialist Federal Republic of Yugoslavia) Miroslav Glišović | 1976 | July 1977 | | | | | | |
| (Socialist Federal Republic of Yugoslavia) Josip Duvančić | July 1977 | 1979 | | | | | | |
| (Socialist Federal Republic of Yugoslavia) Dušan Nenković | 1979 | 1982 | | | | | | |
| (Socialist Federal Republic of Yugoslavia) Ilija Dimoski | 1982 | March 1984 | | | | | | |
| (Socialist Federal Republic of Yugoslavia) Miroslav Glišović | March 1984 | 1984 | | | | | | |
| (Socialist Federal Republic of Yugoslavia) Dušan Nenković | 1984 | June 1985 | | | | | | |
| (Socialist Federal Republic of Yugoslavia) Milorad Janković (caretaker) | June 1985 | 1985 | | | | | | |
| (Socialist Federal Republic of Yugoslavia) Josip Duvančić | 1985 | 1986 | | | | | | 1985–86 Yugoslav Second League (Group East) |
| (Socialist Federal Republic of Yugoslavia) Zoran Čolaković | July 1986 | June 1987 | | | | | | |
| (Socialist Federal Republic of Yugoslavia) Milan Živadinović | June 1987 | 1988 | | | | | | |
| (Socialist Federal Republic of Yugoslavia) Slobodan Halilović | 1988 | 1989 | | | | | | 1988–89 Balkans Cup runners-up |
| (Socialist Federal Republic of Yugoslavia) Dragan Pantelić | 1989 | March 1990 | | | | | | |
| (Socialist Federal Republic of Yugoslavia) Slobodan Halilović | March 1990 | 1991 | | | | | | |
| (Socialist Federal Republic of Yugoslavia) Nenad Cvetković | 1991 | November 1991 | | | | | | |
| (Federal Republic of Yugoslavia) Vladislav Nikolić | November 1991 | 1992 | | | | | | |
| (Federal Republic of Yugoslavia) Ljuborad Stevanović | 1992 | 1993 | | | | | | |
| (Federal Republic of Yugoslavia) Milovan Đorić | October 1993 | December 1993 | | | | | | |
| (Federal Republic of Yugoslavia) Zoran Banković | December 1993 | 1994 | | | | | | |
| (Federal Republic of Yugoslavia) Vladimir Milosavljević | 1994 | April 1994 | | | | | | |
| (Federal Republic of Yugoslavia) Miodrag Stefanović | 1994 | 1995 | | | | | | |
| (Croatia) Josip Duvančić | April 1995 | July 1995 | | | | | | |
| (Federal Republic of Yugoslavia) Milorad Janković | 1995 | March 1996 | | | | | | |
| (Federal Republic of Yugoslavia) Nenad Cvetković | March 1996 | 1996 | | | | | | |
| (Bosnia and Herzegovina) Slobodan Halilović | | 1997 | | | | | | |
| (Federal Republic of Yugoslavia) Miodrag Stefanović | 1997 | 1997 | | | | | | |
| (Federal Republic of Yugoslavia) Mile Tomić | 1997 | 1997 | | | | | | |
| (Federal Republic of Yugoslavia) Miodrag Stojiljković | 1997 | 1997 | | | | | | |
| (Federal Republic of Yugoslavia) Vladislav Nikolić | 1997 | 1998 | | | | | | |
| (Federal Republic of Yugoslavia) Miodrag Ješić | 1998 | 1998 | | | | | | |
| (Federal Republic of Yugoslavia) Boško Antić | 1998 | 1998 | | | | | | |
| (North Macedonia) Ilija Dimoski | 1998 | January 1999 | | | | | | |
| (Federal Republic of Yugoslavia) Radmilo Ivančević | January 1999 | 1999 | | | | | | |
| (Federal Republic of Yugoslavia) Boris Bunjak | 1999 | 1999 | | | | | | |
| (Federal Republic of Yugoslavia) Zoran Čolaković | 1999 | October 2000 | | | | | | |
| (Federal Republic of Yugoslavia) Jovica Škoro | October 2000 | October 2000 | | | | | | |
| (Federal Republic of Yugoslavia) Aleksandar Jovanovski | October 2000 | November 2000 | | | | | | |
| (Federal Republic of Yugoslavia) Dragan Pantelić | November 2000 | November 2000 | | | | | | |
| (Federal Republic of Yugoslavia) Vladislav Nikolić | November 2000 | December 2000 | | | | | | |
| (Federal Republic of Yugoslavia) Slobodan Pavković | December 2000 | 2001 | | | | | | |
| (Federal Republic of Yugoslavia) Vladislav Nikolić | | June 2002 | | | | | | 2001–02 Second League of FR Yugoslavia (Group East) |
| (Federal Republic of Yugoslavia) Tomislav Manojlović | June 2002 | September 2002 | | | | | | |
| (Federal Republic of Yugoslavia) Boban Krstić | September 2002 | December 2002 | | | | | | |
| (Federal Republic of Yugoslavia) Zoran Milenković | December 2002 | 2003 | | | | | | |
| (North Macedonia) Ilija Dimoski | 2003 | | | | | | | |
| (Serbia and Montenegro) Zoran Čolaković | | 2004 | | | | | | |
| (Serbia and Montenegro) Ljuborad Stevanović | 2004 | April 2005 | | | | | | |
| (Serbia and Montenegro) Milan Jovin | April 2005 | 2005 | | | | | | |
| (Serbia and Montenegro) Boris Bunjak | 2005 | August 2005 | | | | | | |
| (Serbia and Montenegro) Zoran Milenković (caretaker) | August 2005 | 2005 | | | | | | |
| (North Macedonia) Boško Đurovski | 2005 | March 2006 | | | | | | |
| (Serbia and Montenegro) Zoran Čolaković | March 2006 | August 2006 | | | | | | |
| (Serbia) Vladimir Jocić | August 2006 | September 2006 | | | | | | |
| (Serbia) Milenko Kiković | September 2006 | October 2006 | | | | | | |
| (Serbia) Dragan Gavrilović (caretaker) | October 2006 | December 2006 | | | | | | |
| (Serbia) Slobodan Antonijević | January 2007 | 2008 | | | | | | |
| (Serbia) Vladimir Jocić | 2008 | 2008 | | | | | | |
| (Serbia) Vladislav Đukić | 2008 | 2009 | | | | | | |
| (Serbia) Slobodan Dogandžić | 2009 | August 2009 | | | | | | |
| (Serbia) Slavoljub Janković | August 2009 | 2009 | | | | | | |
| (Serbia) Aleksandar Ilić | 2009 | 2010 | | | | | | |
| (Serbia) Aleksandar Kuzmanović | July 2010 | December 2010 | | | | | | |
| (Serbia) Dragan Ilić | January 2011 | June 2011 | | | | | | 2010–11 Serbian League East |
| (Serbia) Zvonko Đorđević | July 2011 | October 2011 | | | | | | |
| (Serbia) Aleksandar Kuzmanović | October 2011 | March 2012 | | | | | | |
| (Serbia) Aleksandar Ilić | March 2012 | February 2013 | | | | | | 2011–12 Serbian First League |
| (Serbia) Saša Mrkić | February 2013 | May 2013 | | | | | | |
| (Serbia) Dragoljub Bekvalac | June 2013 | March 2014 | | | | | | |
| (Serbia) Milan Milanović | March 2014 | June 2014 | | | | | | |
| (Serbia) Dragoslav Stepanović | July 2014 | September 2014 | | | | | | |
| (Serbia) Saša Mrkić | September 2014 | December 2014 | | | | | | |
| (Serbia) Milan Rastavac | December 2014 | May 2017 | | | | | | |
| (Austria) Peter Pacult | June 2017 | September 2017 | | | | | | |
| (Serbia) Ivan Jević | September 2017 | October 2017 | | | | | | |
| (Serbia) Milan Đuričić | October 2017 | December 2017 | 10 | 5 | 3 | 2 | 50.00 | |
| (Serbia) Boban Dmitrović | January 2018 | March 2018 | 6 | 3 | 1 | 2 | 50.00 | |
| (Serbia) Dragan Antić | March 2018 | May 2018 | 9 | 4 | 1 | 4 | 44.44 | |
| (Serbia) Nenad Lalatović | June 2018 | June 2019 | | | | | | |
| (Bosnia and Herzegovina) Simo Krunić | July 2019 | August 2019 | | | | | | |
| (Serbia) Milorad Kosanović | August 2019 | February 2020 | | | | | | |
| (Montenegro) Radoslav Batak | February 2020 | October 2020 | | | | | | |
| (Serbia) Milan Đuričić | October 2020 | November 2020 | | | | | | |
| (Serbia) Vladimir Gaćinović | November 2020 | April 2021 | | | | | | |
| (Serbia) Aleksandar Stanković | April 2021 | May 2021 | | | | | | |
| (Serbia) Nenad Lalatović | June 2021 | June 2021 | 0 | 0 | 0 | 0 | — | |
| (Serbia) Aleksandar Stanković | June 2021 | August 2021 | | | | | | |
| (Serbia) Radomir Koković | September 2021 | September 2021 | 2 | 1 | 0 | 1 | 50.00 | |
| (Montenegro) Radoslav Batak | September 2021 | May 2022 | | | | | | |
| (Serbia) Tomislav Sivić | June 2022 | August 2022 | 7 | 0 | 4 | 3 | 0.00 | |
| (Serbia) Saša Mrkić | August 2022 | September 2022 | 5 | 2 | 1 | 2 | 40.00 | |
| (Serbia) Nenad Lalatović | September 2022 | March 2023 | 16 | 4 | 5 | 7 | 25.00 | |
| (Serbia) Dragan Šarac | March 2023 | June 2023 | | | | | | |
| (Serbia) Vladimir Đorđević (caretaker) | June 2023 | June 2023 | 1 | 1 | 0 | 0 | 100.00 | |
| (Serbia) Nikola Trajković | June 2023 | November 2023 | 15 | 4 | 4 | 7 | 26.67 | |
| (Serbia) Slavoljub Đorđević | November 2023 | December 2023 | | | | | | |
| (Serbia) Nikola Trajković | January 2024 | March 2024 | | | | | | |
| (Serbia) Aleksandar Jovanović (caretaker) | March 2024 | March 2024 | 1 | 0 | 0 | 1 | 0.00 | |
| (Serbia) Dejan Joksimović | March 2024 | June 2024 | | | | | | |
| (Montenegro) Nikola Drinčić | June 2024 | March 2025 | | | | | | |
| (Cyprus) Siniša Dobrašinović | March 2025 | 2025 | | | | | | |
| (Serbia) Slavko Matić | June 2025 | August 2025 | | | | | | |
| (Serbia) Tomislav Sivić | August 2025 | December 2025 | | | | | | |
| (Greece) Takis Lemonis | December 2025 | | | | | | | |
