= Miloš Perić =

Serbian footballer

Personal information
- Full name: Miloš Perić
- Date of birth: 27 July 1990 (age 36)
- Place of birth: Aleksinac, SFR Yugoslavia
- Height: 1.85 m (6 ft 1 in)
- Position: Goalkeeper

Youth career
- Radnički Niš

Senior career*
Years	Team	Apps	(Gls)
2007–2015	Radnički Niš	26	(0)
2009–2010	→ Sinđelić Niš (loan)		
2014	→ Radnik Surdulica (loan)	1	(0)
2015	→ Radnički Pirot (loan)	14	(0)
2015–2016	Radnički Pirot	13	(0)
2016–2017	Radnički Niš	0	(0)
2016–2017	→ Car Konstantin (loan)	18	(0)
2017	Fjarðabyggð	21	(0)
2017–2018	Car Konstantin		
2018	Fjarðabyggð	22	(0)
2018–2019	Car Konstantin		
2019	Fjarðabyggð	22	(0)
2019–2020	Car Konstantin		
2020	Fjarðabyggð	20	(0)
2020–2021	Car Konstantin		
2021	Fjarðabyggð	22	(0)
2022	Haukar	22	(0)
- * Club domestic league appearances and goals as of 1 January 2023

Miloš Perić (Serbian Cyrillic: Милош Перић; born 27 July 1990) is a Serbian footballer who most recently played as a goalkeeper for Icelandic third-tier side Haukar.

== Club career ==
Born in Aleksinac, Perić debuted for the first team of Radnički Niš at the age of 18. He made 6 Serbian First League caps for the next season. After Radnički relegated to the Serbian League East, Perić spent some period as a loaned player with local club Sinđelić. Returning in the club, he was mostly used as a reserve choice for experienced Zoran Vasković until the 2012–13 season, when got a chance from the 2nd fixture of the competition making his Serbian SuperLiga debut. He spent the rest of half-season as a first goalkeeper, and was nominated for the best player of the half-season by the fans choice. Later, after Aleksandar Kesić joined the club in the winter break off-season, Perić moved on the bench. He also played several matches before the end of season. Later, he was out of the team mostly time until the end of contact with Radnički, and spent mostly time as a loaned player in other clubs until 2015. In summer 2016, Perić returned in his home club.

Perić was loaned to Sinđelić, where he spent some period during the 2009–10 Serbian League East season. After the 2013–14 season, without matches for Radnički Niš, Miloš was loaned to Radnik Surdulica for the first half of new season, but he spent mostly time as a reserve for Bojan Šejić, making just 1 league and 1 cup match. At the beginning of 2015, Perić moved to Radnički Pirot, where he spent the whole year. The first half of year he spent as a loaned player of Radnički Niš, and later he joined the club as a single player. After returning to Radnički Niš in summer 2016, Perić moved on one-year loan to Car Konstantin. In April 2017, Perić moved to the Icelandic side Fjarðabyggðar, where he collected 21 matches in the 2017 2. deild karla as also 2 matches in the domestic cup. Returning to the Serbian League East side Car Konstantin as a single player for the 2017–18 season, Perić was elected for the best goalkeeper of the tournament "Čukarica 2018".

== Statistics ==
As of 17 March 2018

Appearances and goals by club, season and competition
Club	Season	League			Cup		Continental		Other		Total	
Club	Season	Division	Apps	Goals	Apps	Goals	Apps	Goals	Apps	Goals	Apps	Goals
Radnički Niš	2007–08	Serbian First League	0	0	—		—		—		0	0
Radnički Niš	2008–09	Serbian League East	—		—		—		—		— (Note: No information available)	
Radnički Niš	2009–10	Serbian First League	6	0	—		—		—		6	0
Radnički Niš	2010–11	Serbian League East	—		—		—		—		—	
Radnički Niš	2011–12	Serbian First League	3	0	1	0	—		—		4	0
Radnički Niš	2012–13	Serbian SuperLiga	17	0	1	0	—		—		18	0
Radnički Niš	2013–14	Serbian SuperLiga	0	0	0	0	—		—		0	0
Radnički Niš	2014–15	Serbian SuperLiga	0	0	0	0	—		—		0	0
Radnički Niš	2015–16	Serbian SuperLiga	0	0	0	0	—		—		0	0
Radnički Niš	2016–17	Serbian SuperLiga	0	0	0	0	—		—		0	0
Radnički Niš	Total		26	0	2	0	—		—		28	0
Sinđelić Niš	2009–10 (loan)	Serbian League East	—		—		—		—		—	
Radnik Surdulica	2014–15 (loan)	Serbian First League	1	0	1	0	—		—		2	0
Radnički Pirot	2014–15 (loan)	Serbian League East	14	0	—		—		2 (Note: Including Pirot District Cup matches against Balkanski and Lužnica)	0	15	0
Radnički Pirot	2015–16	Serbian League East	13	0	—		—		—		13	0
Radnički Pirot	Total		27	0	—		—		2	0	28	0
Fjarðabyggðar	2017	2. deild karla	21	0	2	0	—		—		23	0
Car Konstantin	2016–17 (loan)	Serbian League East	18	0	—		—		—		18	0
Car Konstantin	2017–18	Serbian League East	0	0	—		—		—		0	0
Car Konstantin	Total		18	0	—		—		—		18	0
Career total			93	0	5	0	—		2	0	100	0

== Honours ==
Radnički Niš

- Serbian League East (2): 2008–09, 2010–11
- Serbian First League: 2011–12

Sinđelić Niš

- Serbian League East: 2009–10

Radnik Surdulica

- Serbian First League: 2014–15

Radnički Pirot

- Serbian League East: 2015–16
