= FK Radnički Niš =

Association football club in Niš, Serbia

Radnički Niš
- Full name: Fudbalski Klub Radnički
- Nickname: Real sa Nišave (Real of the Nišava)
- Founded: 24 April 1923; 103 years ago
- Ground: Čair Stadium
- Capacity: 18,151
- President: Vidosav Radomirović
- Manager: Nikola Drinčić
- League: Serbian SuperLiga
- 2025–26: Serbian SuperLiga, 10th of 16
- Website: fkradnickinis.rs
Home colours	Away colours	Third colours

FK Radnički Niš (Serbian Cyrillic: ФК Раднички Ниш) is a professional football club based in Niš, Serbia. The club competes in the Serbian SuperLiga, the top tier of Serbian football.

One of the most successful clubs in the former Yugoslavia, the club spent a total of 29 seasons in the Yugoslav First League, including two 3rd-place finishes in 1980 and 1981. The club also played 10 seasons in the First League of FR Yugoslavia and has been competing in the Serbian SuperLiga since 2012, finishing 3rd in 2018 and 2nd in 2019. In international competitions, Radnički won the Balkans Cup in 1975, made another final in 1989, and reached the semi-finals of the UEFA Cup in 1982.

== History ==
=== Beginnings (1923–1945) ===
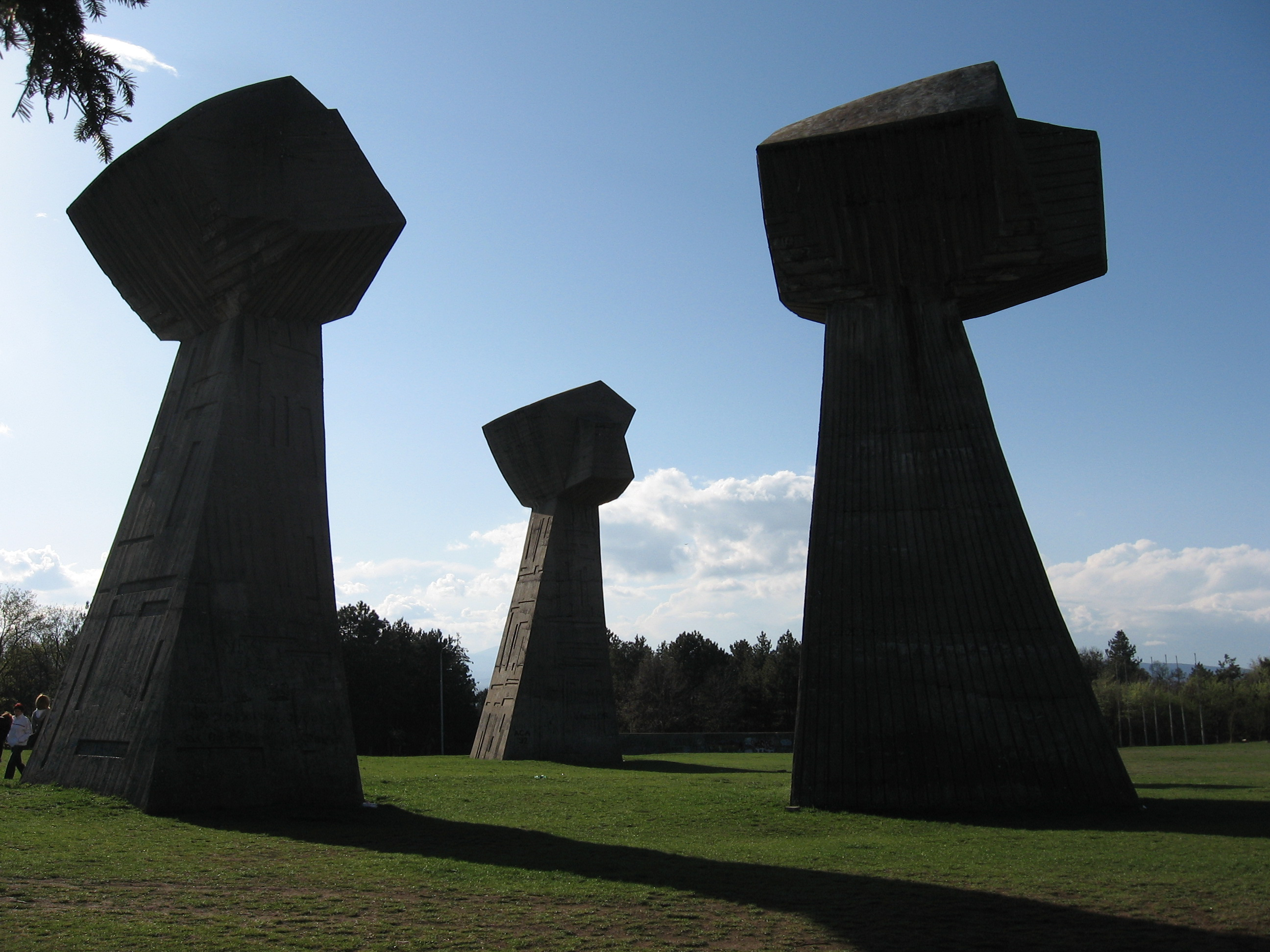
"The Fists", one of the monuments in memory of the victims of the Bubanj massacre

The club was founded on April 24, 1923, in the Kingdom of Serbs, Croats and Slovenes. One of its founders was the communist activist Miloš Marković (who also founded Sloboda Užice in 1925). In the same year, the club played its first unofficial matches. Two years later, in the 1925–26 season, the club became part of the professional league of the Morava Banovina, and won the championship on two occasions, in the 1924–25 and 1927–28 seasons.

Following the proclamation of the royal dictatorship in 1929, the government began to persecute leftist activists, and Radnički changed its name to Građanski. As Građanski Niš, the club played in the 1936 Yugoslav Football Championship which was played in a straight-knockout competition format, and was eliminated in the round of sixteen by Građanski Skoplje. At the end of that season the club reinstated its original name, and played until 1941, when, because of the war, the club ceased its activities and its members and players joined the resistance.

At the beginning of World War II in the Kingdom of Yugoslavia in 1941, the club terminated the activities, which were renewed in 1945, one year after the liberation from the occupation of Nazi Germany.

=== The rise and stabilization (1962–1975) ===
In 1962, Radnički Niš were promoted to the Yugoslav First League for the first time in the club's history. On 23 September 1962, Radnički fans displayed their first big choreography on the first league match against Red Star Belgrade. A large banner reading "Real sa Nišave", which translates to "Real from Nisava" was raised on the east stand, and the club bears this nickname to this day. The banner could be seen at every home game throughout the 1960s. In following years, the club underwent major development and became one of the most stable football clubs in the country. In 1963, the club founded its youth school, through which many of the Radnički players passed. In 1975, Radnički beat Turkish club Eskişehirspor (1–0, 2–1) and won its first trophy of European importance, the Balkans Cup.

=== The Golden Era (1980–1984) ===
In 1980, Radnički finished the national championship in 3rd place, the best placement thus far, and played for the first time in the UEFA Cup in the following season, during which Radnički reached the round of sixteen, but lost against Dutch club AZ Alkmaar. In 1981, the club was again third and qualified for the 1981–82 UEFA Cup season. In the first round, Radnički Niš were drawn against Napoli. In the first leg, the club from South Serbia achieved a 2–2 draw in front of 70.000 spectators at Stadio San Paolo, which was enough for Radnički to progress after a goalless match in Serbia because of the away goals rule. After eliminating the Azzurri, Radnički played the second round against Grasshopper Club Zürich. The Swiss club won the first match in Zürich by 2–0, but Radnički had equalized with a 2–0 and won convincingly 3–0 in the penalty shoot-out. In the third round, the club played against Feyenoord from Rotterdam. In the first leg in Niš, the result was 2–0 for Radnički and at De Kuip the result was 1–0 for the Dutch club. However, it was a 2–1 victory on aggregate for the Serbian club and in the quarter-finals Radnički were drawn against Dundee United from Scotland. In the first leg, played in Dundee, Radnički suffered a 2–0 defeat. Although they were not seen as the favourites in the return leg, the Real from Nišava pulled off a convincing 3–0 win in front of its spectators, and with an aggregate score of 3–2 they eventually achieved their greatest success by reaching the semi-finals of this prestigious tournament.

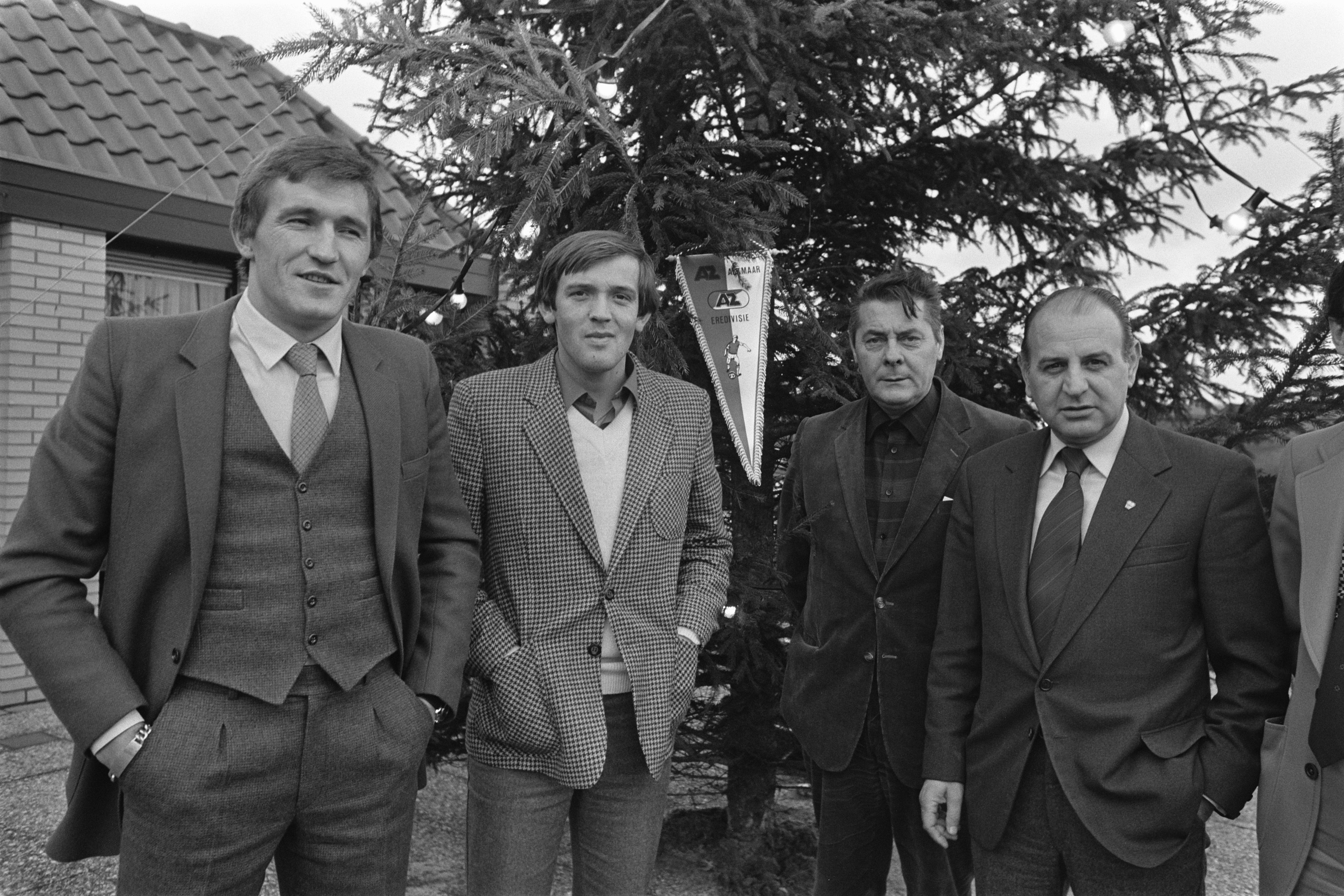
Radnički Niš goalkeeper Dragan Pantelić, defender Milovan Obradović, and coach Dušan Nenković in Heiloo in December 1980 before the UEFA Cup third round match against AZ Alkmaar.

The semi-finals provided a football holiday at Čair Stadium, due to the fact that German top club Hamburger SV, led by stars like Horst Hrubesch, Felix Magath, Lars Bastrup, Manfred Kaltz, Thomas von Heesen and Uli Stein would play in Niš. In the first leg, Radnički Niš won against the favored North Germans in front of 38,500 enthusiastic Radnički fans with 2–1, but they lost the second leg in Hamburg by 5–1 (Hamburg lost at the end the final, but won next year the 1982–83 European Cup). After one year of absence from international football, the club qualified for the 1983–84 UEFA Cup season (finished the 1979–80 Yugoslav First League season in 4th place) and reached the round of sixteen, as in 1981. After winning matches against St Gallen (3–0, 2–1) and FK Inter Bratislava (4–0, 2–3), Radnički played against Hajduk Split. It was the first intra-Yugoslav fixture in UEFA cup. Hajduk won both matches 2–0 and progressed to the quarter-finals.

Radnički Niš played a total of 22 matches across Europe between 1981 and 1984. During this time, Radnički lost only one UEFA Cup home match of a total of 11 across three seasons and only against a team from the domestic league. They had raucous fans who made Čair Stadium a tough ground for the opposition.

=== Late Yugoslavia period/Serbia-Montenegro period (1985–2006) ===
After the golden years, Radnički Niš was unexpectedly relegated to in the Yugoslav Second League in 1985, after 23 continuous years in the first league. However, under coach Josip Duvančić, Radnički won the Yugoslav Second League in the following season and returned to the first league after only a year of absence. In 1989, the club played its second Balkans Cup final after 1975, but they lost against OFI of Greece by 3–1. At the beginning of the 1990s, the entire country was plunged into a crisis. The disintegration of Yugoslavia, the civil war (1992–95), the inflation and the UN sanctions hit all the Yugoslav football teams hard, and also Radnički was no exception. In the 2000–01 season, the club dropped out of the first division for the second time in its history. In the following season, Radnički Niš won the second division championship and quickly returned to the major clubs, but they ended the 2002–03 season in last place. After that, the club competed in the second league for the following five seasons.

=== Serbian SuperLiga ===
In the 2008–09 season, Radnički was relegated to Serbia's third division. They won the division, but they ended the 2009–10 Serbian First League season in the relegation zone.

In the 2010–11 season, they won the Serbian League East and were promoted to the Serbian First League, Serbia's second division.

The club won the 2011–12 Serbian First League and was promoted to the Serbian SuperLiga, Serbia's highest football tier. In the same season, the club's home ground was rebuilt. Since then, the club became stable in Serbian SuperLiga, gradually improving its position on the league table and establishing itself as a major club in Serbian football once again. In their first season in the highest division, Radnički Niš finished in 12th place, but improved every following season, finishing 6th, 9th and twice in 5th place.

In season 2017–18 Serbian SuperLiga, Radnički Niš finished in third place, which guaranteed them a place in the first qualifying round of UEFA Europa League.

The following season marked the club's return to European competitions where they eliminated Maltese club Gzira United 5–0 on aggregate in the first qualifying round for the 2018–19 UEFA Europa League. Radnički was later eliminated in the second round by the Israeli team Maccabi Tel Aviv 4–2 on aggregate. In the SuperLiga, Radnički finished the season in second place behind defending champions Red Star Belgrade, once again reaching the qualifying rounds for the UEFA Europa League.

== Club colors and crest ==
The club played in a green-white jersey and on the left, in the white field, was a red five-pointed star as a symbol of affiliation with the Labour movement, the colour of which was later taken as a frequent kit color of Radnički. The club also used a blue and white kit, which was commonly seen during promotion play-offs and international fixtures, so the club bears all the colors of the Serbian flag. The crest is in the colors red and white, and bears the inscription of the year of foundation and the image of the Niš Fortress, which is a complex and important cultural and historical monument of the city of Niš.

Kit evolution

1962–89
1977–85
1962–77
Radnički Niš's present crest

== Stadium ==
The home ground of Radnički Niš is the Čair Stadium. It is named after the Čair neighbourhood in Medijana, the most populous municipality of Niš. The construction of the stadium was finished in 1963, and had a capacity of 40,000 spectators. After renovations between 2011 and 2012, the stadium capacity has been brought to 18,151 seats. The stadium is part of the Čair sports complex, which also includes the modern sporting arena Čair, a modern indoor swimming pool and other facilities. After the renovation of the swimming pool, the Čair Sports Center, and the complete reconstruction of the Čair stadium, Niš was endowed with a unique sports complex in Serbia and completed a full reconstruction of its sports infrastructure.

=== Reconstruction (2011-2012) ===
The Čair stadium began undergoing complete reconstruction during the second half of 2011 in an ambitious project by the Football Association of Serbia and the city of Niš. The project included the renovation of eastern, southern and northern stands. When reconstruction was finished, the stadium's seating capacity had been increased to 18,151 spectators, including an additional VIP lounge with 120 seats and a media lodge with 50 seats. The project also entailed covering the whole stadium, new floodlights and LED, a new locker room and press room, new infirmaries, a parking area, ticket offices, a restaurant and a TV room for broadcasts. After reconstruction, the stadium fulfilled the most up to date UEFA standards. The cost of the project was estimated to be over 1.1 billion Serbian dinars (10 million euros).

=== Debut game at the new stadium ===
Although it had not been completely finished, Čair Stadium was declared as a suitable venue for the second home match of the 2012 season (the first home match had to be played at Jagodina City Stadium against Radnički Kragujevac). The home opening match took place in the 5th round of Serbian SuperLiga against Smederevo 1924 on September 15, 2012. About 7,000 seats had been initially installed and they were completely filled. Manager Aleksandar Ilić fielded the following squad: Stevan Stefanović, Branislav Vukomanović, Milan Jovanović, Marko Ranđelović, Miloš Perić, Bratislav Pejčić, Aleksandar Jovanović, Dušan Kolarević, Miloš Petrović, Vladan Binić and Strahinja Petrović. In the 84th minute, midfielder Dušan Kolarević scored via a 30-meter strike and brought Radnički Niš to a 1–0 win in the opening match.

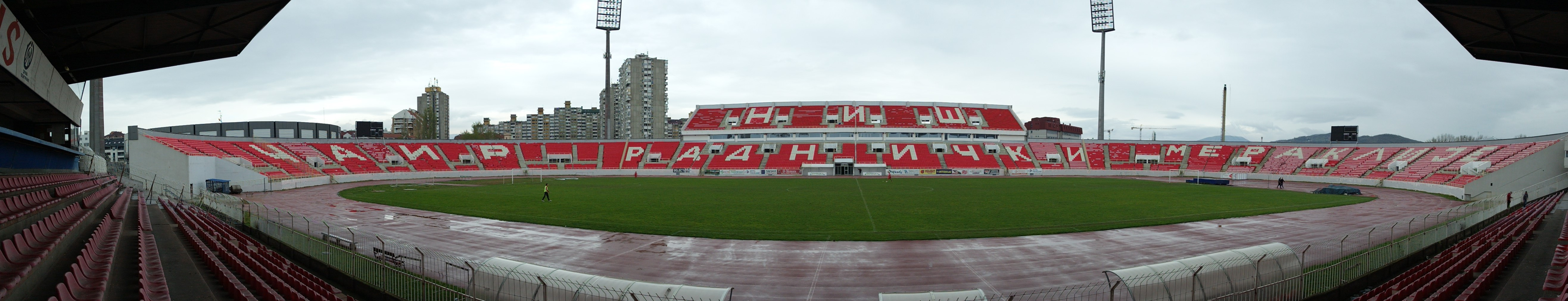
Čair Stadium panorama

== Radnički's Ivan Krstić youth school ==
An important segment of the club is its youth school, which was founded in 1963. The youth school is named after former Radnički's football player Ivan Krstić. He enrolled in Radnički's youth school and eventually became captain. At the beginning of his career, he was killed during training as a result of a lightning strike on the auxiliary field, near the youth school. The football school bears his name to this day.

=== History ===
During 1963, one year after entry of Radnički in the Yugoslav First League, the club formed its own football schools at the initiative of Tihomir Petrović. Forty-eight players were selected from nine primary schools and began to learn the football alphabet at Radnički.

The first greater success came in 1966, when they won a large tournament in Germany. In 1969, this was followed by winning a tournament in Paris, defeating the Italian team US Cagliari.

More success followed, incouding the win at the international tournament "Vojvodina-Red Star", which was played in 1984 and which saw the participation of many national and international top youth teams. During the tournament, Radnički's youth was led by Milorad Janković, a former player of Radnički, who was honoured as the top youth coach by the Football Association of Yugoslavia.

In 1991, led by coach Vladislav Nikolić, they won the Yugoslav championship, after defeating Željezničar Sarajevo (1–0 at home by a goal from Dejan Petković, 1–1). In 1992, Radnički again fielded a national championship team in their series. Its cadets were Yugoslav champions and repeated the success achieved the previous year, which was a triumph for the managers of the youth school and coaches like Miroslav Glišović, Milorad Janković, Ljubiša Rajković and Miodrag Stefanović.

The last major success of the Radnički's football school was in 2000, when Radnički's cadets, led by coach Aleksandar Jovanovski, won the Serbian championship. In the final, they beat Red Star Belgrade by a score of 1–0 and qualified for the final tournament for the Yugoslav championship. Radnički finished in 3rd place. In the same year, new sport facilities were opened which facilitated better working conditions.

Today, the youth coaches are mostly former players of Radnički who are responsible for 400–450 young Radnički players and working according to the standards of major European football clubs.

== Supporters ==
The first large organized support happened in 1962 against Vardar, when several thousand fans from Niš travelled to Skoplje. In 1962, Radnički Niš were promoted to the Yugoslav First League for the first time in their history and attracted more supporters from Niš and the surrounding region. Since Radnički's entry to the first division, Čair has always been a tough ground for the opposition. Although the club has had numerous supporters throughout the history, more organized groups emerged at the end of the 1980s. The name Meraklije was accepted, which roughly translates to "bohemian hedonists". The name has been synonymous with region customs for centuries. Besides the football club, Meraklije also support other sport sections like handball, and the Serbian national handball team.

== Club honours and achievements ==
Radnički Niš results through seasons 1945–46 – present
1st	National Tier – Premier Level			
2nd	National Tier - Inter-Republic or national level. (commonly in 2 divisions – 3 repub. + 1 autonomous province).	+++SAP Vojvodina as West +++SAP Kosovo as East (most common division of Yugoslav 2nd League by Yugoslav FA)		
3rd	National Tier – Republic or regional level. (always in multiple groups).	Yugoslav Republics. Serbia & Montenegro.		
4th	National Tier – Province, County or City level. (3–6 districts compose Zone Leagues except Belgrade – 1)	Belgrade 1 Vojvodina East 4 & Vojvodina West 3 Niš 6 Pomoravlje-Timok 4 Drina 3 Dunav 3 Morava 4		
Season	League	Position	FA Cup	European Cups ▲ Promotion/relegation ▼ Notes
	SFR Yugoslavia	1945–1992		
1945–46	City of Niš / Niš County League	2		
1946–47	Yugoslav First League (part of 14. Oktobar Niš)	13		▼ Relegated
1947–48	Serbian 4th Zone	5	-	** Cup
1948–49	Serbian 5th Zone	3	-	▲ Promoted through Quals. / ** Cup
1950	Football League of PR Serbia	5	-	** Cup
1951	Football League of PR Serbia (dissolved)	12	-	** Cup
1952	League of Niš Football Subassociation	1	1/16	** Cup
1952–53	League of Niš Football Subassociation	1	1/2	▲ Promoted through Quals. / ** Cup
1953–54	Football League of PR Serbia – Group South	4	-	** Cup
1954–55	Football League of PR Serbia – Group South	2	1/8	▲ Promoted / ** Cup
1955–56	Yugoslav Zone IV	9	-	** Cup
1956–57	Yugoslav Zone IV	2	-	
1957–58	Yugoslav Zone IV	2	-	
1958–59	Yugoslav Second League East	9	1/16	
1959–60	Yugoslav Second League East	9	1/8	
1960–61	Yugoslav Second League East	5	-	
1961–62	Yugoslav Second League East	2	1/16	▲ Promoted
1962–63	Yugoslav First League	6	1/16	
1963–64	Yugoslav First League	8	1/8	
1964–65	Yugoslav First League	7	1/4	
1965–66	Yugoslav First League	7	-	
1966–67	Yugoslav First League	9	1/8	
1967–68	Yugoslav First League	9	1/8	
1968–69	Yugoslav First League	7	1/8	
1969–70	Yugoslav First League	8	1/2	
1970–71	Yugoslav First League	11	-	
1971–72	Yugoslav First League	14	1/4	
1972–73	Yugoslav First League	11	1/4	
1973–74	Yugoslav First League	15	1/4	
1974–75	Yugoslav First League	10	1/16	
1975–76	Yugoslav First League	16	1/8	**** 1975 Winner of Balkans Cup
1976–77	Yugoslav First League	7	1/2	
1977–78	Yugoslav First League	14	1/16	
1978–79	Yugoslav First League	7	1/4	
1979–80	Yugoslav First League	3	1/16	
1980–81	Yugoslav First League	3	1/4	UEFA Cup 1/8 Finals
1981–82	Yugoslav First League	11	1/16	UEFA Cup 1/2 Finals
1982–83	Yugoslav First League	4	1/16	
1983–84	Yugoslav First League	7	1/4	UEFA Cup 1/8 Finals
1984–85	Yugoslav First League	18	1/16	▼ Relegated
1985–86	Yugoslav Second League East	1	1/4	▲ Promoted
1986–87	Yugoslav First League	16	1/16	
1987–88	Yugoslav First League	7	1/4	
1988–89	Yugoslav First League	7	1/8	**** 1988–89 Finalist of Balkans Cup
1989–90	Yugoslav First League	15	1/16	
1990–91	Yugoslav First League	10	1/16	
1991–92	Yugoslav First League ***	11	1/16	*** Slovenia & Croatia independent.
	FR Yugoslavia	1992–2002		
1992–93	First League of FR Yugoslavia ***	7	1/16	*** FYR Macedonia & Bosnia independent.
1993–94	First League of FR Yugoslavia	* 14	1/2	* IA + IB combined result
1994–95	First League of FR Yugoslavia	* 12	-	* IA + IB combined result
1995–96	First League of FR Yugoslavia	* 9	-	* IA + IB combined result
1996–97	First League of FR Yugoslavia	* 16	1/8	* IA + IB combined result
1997–98	First League of FR Yugoslavia	* 17	1/8	* IA + IB combined result
1998–99	First League of FR Yugoslavia	16	1/16	
1999–00	First League of FR Yugoslavia	11	1/16	
2000–01	First League of FR Yugoslavia	17	1/16	▼ Relegated
2001–02	Yugoslav Second League East	1	1/16	▲ Promoted
	Serbia and Montenegro	2002–2006		
2002–03	First League of Serbia and Montenegro	18	1/16	▼ Relegated
2003–04	Second League East	3	1/16	
2004–05	Second League – Group Serbia	15	1/16	
2005–06	Serbian First League	10	1/2	
	Serbia	2006–present		
2006–07	Serbian First League	11	1/8	
2007–08	Serbian First League	14	1/8	▼ Relegated
2008–09	Serbian League – Group East	1	1/16	▲ Promoted
2009–10	Serbian First League	15	-	▼ Relegated
2010–11	Serbian League – Group East	1	Pr. Rd.	▲ Promoted
2011–12	Serbian First League	1	1/16	▲ Promoted
2012–13	Serbian Super League	12	1/16	
2013–14	Serbian Super League	6	1/8	
*	The league was divided into 2 groups, A and B, consisting each of 10 clubs. Both groups were played in league system. By winter break all clubs in each group met each home and away, with the bottom four from A group moving to the group B, and being replaced by the top four from the B group. At the end of the season the same situation happened with four teams being replaced from A and B groups, adding the fact that the bottom three clubs from the B group were relegated into the Second League of FR Yugoslavia for the next season and replaced by the top three from that league.			
**	Cups have been played in the fall half of the season from 1947 until 1955, thus crediting for example 1955 Yugoslav Cup towards 1955–56 season.			
***	Break-up of SFR Yugoslavia. In 1991–92 season Croatia and Slovenia formed their leagues. In 1992–93 season FYR Macedonia and 3 ethnic entities in Bosnia formed their leagues. FK Borac Banja Luka remained within FR Yugoslavia leagues until 1994–95.			
****	Regional competition for clubs from Albania, Bulgaria, Greece, Romania, Turkey, and Yugoslavia. It has been played 28 times in the period from 1961 to 1994.			

=== Domestic ===
National Championships

- Serbian SuperLiga
  - Runners-up (1): 2018–19
- Yugoslav Second League
  - Winner (1): 1985–86
- Serbian First League
  - Winner (2): 2001–02, 2011–12
- Serbian League East
  - Winner (2): 2008–09, 2010–11
- Niš Subassociation League
  - Winner (3): 1933, 1934, 1936 (all as Građanski Niš)

=== International ===
- UEFA Cup:
  - Semi-Finalist (1): 1981–82
- Balkans Cup:
  - Winners (1): 1975
  - Runners-up (1): 1988–89

=== Individual awards ===
Serbian First League top scorers

Season	Name	Goals
2011–12	(Serbia) Ivan Pejčić	13

Serbian SuperLiga top scorers

Season	Name	Goals
2018–19	(Bosnia and Herzegovina) Nermin Haskić	24

=== Radnički Niš totals by league rank and highest achievements ===
Tier	Achievements	Seasons						Trophies
1st	40 Seasons							
	Bronze medal	(1980, 1981)						
	4th	(1983)						
	6th	(1 Time)						
	7th	(9 Times)						
	8th	(2 Times)						
	9th	(3 Times)						
	10th	(2 Times)						
	11th	(5 Times)						
	12th	(2 Times)						
	13th	(1 Time)						
	14th	(3 Times)						
	15th	(2 Times)						
	16th	(4 Times)						
	17th	(2 Times)						
	18th	(2 Times)						
2nd	16 seasons							
	Gold medal	(1986, 2002, 2012)						
	Silver medal	(1957, 1958, 1962)						
	Bronze medal	(2004)						
	5th	(1 Time)						
	9th	(3 Times)						
	10th	(1 X)						
	11th	(1 Time)						
	14th	(1 Time)						
	15th	(2 Times)						
3rd	6 seasons							
	Gold medal	(2009, 2011)						
	Silver medal	(1955)						
	4th	(1 Time)						
	5th	(1 Time)						
	12th	(1 Time)						
4th	5 seasons							
	Gold medal	(1952, 1953)						
	Silver medal	(1946)						
	Bronze medal	(1949)						
	5th	(1 time)						
Cup	51 Appearances							
	1/2	(1952, 1970, 1977, 1994, 2006)						
	1/4	(9 Times)						
	1/8	(12 Times)						
	1/16	(24 Times)						
	Preliminary Rd.	(1 Time)						
EC	Achievements	European Seasons	Matches Played	Wins	Draws	Losses	Goal Difference	Trophies
	1/8 Finals	1980–81 UEFA Cup	6	4	1	1	11–10	
	1/2 Finals	1981–82 UEFA Cup	10	4	2	4	13–13	
	1/8 Finals	1983–84 UEFA Cup	6	3	0	3	11–8	
	3 Appearances	Total stats in UEFA Cup	22	11	3	8	35–31	
Mitropa Cup	Group 1	'1990 Mitropa Cup'	2	1	0	1	1–3	
	1 Appearance	Total stats in Mitropa Cup	2	1	0	1	1–3	
	Group B2	1964–65 Rappan Cup	6	2	1	3	13–12	
	Group B2	1965–66 Rappan Cup	6	2	1	3	11–13	
	2 Appearances	Total stats in Rappan / Intertoto Cup	12	4	2	6	24–25	
	Group B	1964 Balkans Cup	2	0	0	2	2–5	
	Gold medal	1975 Balkans Cup	6	4	2	0	8–1	Balkans Cup
	Silver medal	1989 Balkans Cup	5	2	1	2	7–8	
	3 Appearances	Total stats in Balkans Cup	13	6	3	4	17–14	
	9 European Seasons	Total stats in Europe	49	22	8	19	76–73	1 Balkans Cup

== Players ==
=== Current squad ===
As of 15 September 2026

Note: Flags indicate national team as defined under FIFA eligibility rules; some limited exceptions apply. Players may hold more than one non-FIFA nationality.

No.	Pos.	Nation	Player
2	DF	SRB	Marko Mijailović
3	DF	SRB	Ranko Jokić
4	DF	SRB	Uroš Vitas
5	DF	SRB	Nikola Zečević (on loan from Häcken)
6	MF	SEN	Franck Kanouté
7	FW	GHA	Issah Abass
9	FW	BLR	Aleksandr Shestyuk
11	FW	SRB	Igor Ivanović
12	GK	SRB	Ivan Kostić
14	FW	SRB	Miloš Rošević
15	MF	SRB	Damjan Krajišnik
17	MF	SRB	Luka Borović
18	DF	SRB	Stefan Veličković

No.	Pos.	Nation	Player
19	FW	GHA	Kwaku Osei
20	DF	SRB	Aleksandar Vidović
22	MF	SRB	Radomir Milosavljević (captain)
23	FW	GHA	Ibrahim Mustapha (on loan from Vojvodina)
24	DF	SRB	Milijan Ilić
25	DF	SRB	Bojan Kovačević
28	FW	USA	Gboly Ariyibi
42	FW	SRB	Dušan Jovanović
70	MF	SRB	Stefan Nikolić
71	DF	SRB	Đorđe Petrović
89	MF	AUT	Luka Izderić
94	GK	SRB	Dejan Stanivuković
98	GK	SRB	Strahinja Manojlović

=== Players with multiple nationalities ===
- (Serbia) (Bosnia and Herzegovina) Strahinja Manojlović
- (Serbia) (Bosnia and Herzegovina) Ranko Jokić
- (Serbia) (Bosnia and Herzegovina) Aleksandar Vidović
- (Serbia) (Bosnia and Herzegovina) Damjan Krajišnik
- (Serbia) (Croatia) Milijan Ilić
- (Austria) (Serbia) Luka Izderić
- (Ghana) (Serbia) Ibrahim Mustapha
- (United States) (Nigeria) Gboly Ariyibi

=== Out on loan ===
Note: Flags indicate national team as defined under FIFA eligibility rules; some limited exceptions apply. Players may hold more than one non-FIFA nationality.

No.	Pos.	Nation	Player
—	GK	BIH	Sergej Bjelica (at Famos Istočna Ilidža until 30 June 2027)

=== Retired number(s) ===
10 (Federal Republic of Yugoslavia) Ivan "Beli" Krstić, midfielder (1999−2000) – posthumous honour.

Since 2000, Radnički Niš has not issued the squad number 10 due to it being retired in memory of Ivan Krstić, who was killed by lightning on 29 May 2000 during training. It was only available to his son, who eventually left the club.

== Club officials ==
As of 13 October 2026

=== Technical staff ===
Current technical staff
- Head coach: (Montenegro) Nikola Drinčić
- Assistant coach: (Serbia) Dejan Babić
- Assistant coach: (Serbia) Vladimir Đorđević
- Goalkeeping coach: (Serbia) Filip Anđelković
- Physiotherapist: (Serbia) Marko Stanković
- Fitness coach: (Serbia) Ivan Tomić
- Fitness coach: (Serbia) Đorđe Vlajković
- Doctor: (Serbia) Nikola Jerkan
- Director of youth department: (Serbia) Saša Mrkić
- Secretary of coaching staff: (Serbia) Milan Cvetanović
- Kit manager: (Serbia) Srđan Mitić

=== Management ===
Current management
- President: (Serbia) Vidosav Radomirović
- Director: (Serbia) Dejan Propadalo
- President of the club assembly: (Serbia) Nataša Nikolić
- Sporting director: (Serbia) Saša Stojanović

== Notable players ==
For the list of current and former Radnički Niš footballers with Wikipedia article, please see Category:FK Radnički Niš players.

To appear in this section a player must have either:

- Played at least 80 games for the club.
- Set a club record or won an individual award while at the club.
- Played at least one international match for their national team at any time.
- (Serbia) Aleksandar Jovanović (1985)
- (Serbia) Aleksandar Jovanović (1992)
- (Serbia) Ivan Pejčić
- (Serbia) Miloš Petrović
- (Serbia) Marko Ranđelović
- (Serbia) Saša Stojanović
- (Serbia) Nemanja Tomić
- (Serbia) Petar Đuričković
- (Serbia) Saša Marjanović
- (Serbia) Zoran Vasković
- (Serbia and Montenegro) (Serbia) Igor Stefanović
- (Federal Republic of Yugoslavia) Ivan Krstić
- (Federal Republic of Yugoslavia) Borislav Stevanović
- (Federal Republic of Yugoslavia) Aleksandar Živković
- (Socialist Federal Republic of Yugoslavia) Jovan Anđelković
- (Socialist Federal Republic of Yugoslavia) Slobodan Antić
- (Socialist Federal Republic of Yugoslavia) Zoran Banković
- (Socialist Federal Republic of Yugoslavia) Samid Beganović
- (Socialist Federal Republic of Yugoslavia) Dragiša Binić
- (Socialist Federal Republic of Yugoslavia) Zoran Bojović
- (Socialist Federal Republic of Yugoslavia) Nenad Cvetković
- (Socialist Federal Republic of Yugoslavia) Vitomir Dimitrijević
- (Socialist Federal Republic of Yugoslavia) Ilija Dimoski
- (Socialist Federal Republic of Yugoslavia) Branislav Đorđević
- (Socialist Federal Republic of Yugoslavia) Miloš Drizić
- (Socialist Federal Republic of Yugoslavia) Goran Gavrilović
- (Socialist Federal Republic of Yugoslavia) Stojan Gavrilović
- (Socialist Federal Republic of Yugoslavia) Slobodan Halilović
- (Socialist Federal Republic of Yugoslavia) Dragan Holcer
- (Socialist Federal Republic of Yugoslavia) Nenad Jakšić
- (Socialist Federal Republic of Yugoslavia) Milorad Janković
- (Socialist Federal Republic of Yugoslavia) Blagoja Kitanovski
- (Socialist Federal Republic of Yugoslavia) Miodrag Knežević
- (Socialist Federal Republic of Yugoslavia) Blagoja Kuleski
- (Socialist Federal Republic of Yugoslavia) Aleksandar Kuzmanović
- (Socialist Federal Republic of Yugoslavia) Zoran Milenković
- (Socialist Federal Republic of Yugoslavia) Zoran Milinković
- (Socialist Federal Republic of Yugoslavia) Boris Milošević
- (Socialist Federal Republic of Yugoslavia) Dušan Mitošević
- (Socialist Federal Republic of Yugoslavia) Srđan Mladenović
- (Socialist Federal Republic of Yugoslavia) Slavoljub Nikolić
- (Socialist Federal Republic of Yugoslavia) Milovan Obradović
- (Socialist Federal Republic of Yugoslavia) Stevan Ostojić
- (Socialist Federal Republic of Yugoslavia) Aleksandar Panajotović
- (Socialist Federal Republic of Yugoslavia) Dragan Pantelić
- (Socialist Federal Republic of Yugoslavia) Dejan Petković
- (Socialist Federal Republic of Yugoslavia) Rade Radisavljević
- (Socialist Federal Republic of Yugoslavia) Dragan Radosavljević
- (Socialist Federal Republic of Yugoslavia) Ljubiša Rajković
- (Socialist Federal Republic of Yugoslavia) Miroslav Simonović
- (Socialist Federal Republic of Yugoslavia) (Federal Republic of Yugoslavia) Goran Stojiljković
- (Socialist Federal Republic of Yugoslavia) Miodrag Stojiljković
- (Socialist Federal Republic of Yugoslavia) Dragan Stojković
- (Socialist Federal Republic of Yugoslavia) Miroslav Vardić
- (Socialist Federal Republic of Yugoslavia) Goran Vasilijević
- (Socialist Federal Republic of Yugoslavia) Josip Višnjić
- (Socialist Federal Republic of Yugoslavia) Miroslav Vojinović
- (Australia) Milan Ivanović
- (Bosnia and Herzegovina) Nermin Haskić
- (Bosnia and Herzegovina) Aleksandar Kosorić
- (Bosnia and Herzegovina) Bojan Letić
- (Bosnia and Herzegovina) Jovo Mišeljić
- (Bulgaria) Metodi Tomanov
- (Cameroon) Basile Yamkam
- (Canada) Milan Borjan
- (Cyprus) Siniša Gogić
- (Cyprus) Vladan Tomić
- (Iraq) Rebin Sulaka
- (Kazakhstan) Bauyrzhan Turysbek
- (Kyrgyzstan) Anton Zemlianukhin
- (North Macedonia) Aleksandar Bajevski
- (North Macedonia) Vlade Lazarevski
- (North Macedonia) Ljubodrag Milošević
- (North Macedonia) Todor Todoroski
- (Montenegro) Darko Bulatović
- (Montenegro) Nikola Drinčić
- (Montenegro) Petar Grbić
- (Montenegro) Milan Jovanović
- (Montenegro) Damir Kojašević
- (Montenegro) Vladimir Volkov
- (Slovakia) Erik Jirka

== Historical list of coaches ==
This is the list of first team coaches of Radnički Niš:

- (Socialist Federal Republic of Yugoslavia) Dimitrije Guberevac
- (Socialist Federal Republic of Yugoslavia) Momčilo Đokić
- (Socialist Federal Republic of Yugoslavia) Aleksandar Petrović
- (Socialist Federal Republic of Yugoslavia) Janko Zvekanović
- (Socialist Federal Republic of Yugoslavia) Miroslav Glišović (1962–63)
- (Socialist Federal Republic of Yugoslavia) Abdulah Gegić (1963)
- (Socialist Federal Republic of Yugoslavia) Dušan Nenković (1963–65)
- (Socialist Federal Republic of Yugoslavia) Dragoljub Milošević (1965–66)
- (Socialist Federal Republic of Yugoslavia) Miroslav Glišović (1966–67)
- (Socialist Federal Republic of Yugoslavia) Ratomir Čabrić (1967–68)
- (Socialist Federal Republic of Yugoslavia) Miroslav Glišović (1968–71)
- (Socialist Federal Republic of Yugoslavia) Slavko Videnović (1971)
- (Socialist Federal Republic of Yugoslavia) Dušan Varagić (1971–72)
- (Socialist Federal Republic of Yugoslavia) Miroslav Glišović (1972–74)
- (Socialist Federal Republic of Yugoslavia) Đorđe Kačunković (1974–76)
- (Socialist Federal Republic of Yugoslavia) Miroslav Glišović (1976–77)
- (Socialist Federal Republic of Yugoslavia) Josip Duvančić (1977–79)
- (Socialist Federal Republic of Yugoslavia) Dušan Nenković (1979–82)
- (Socialist Federal Republic of Yugoslavia) Ilija Dimoski (1982–84)
- (Socialist Federal Republic of Yugoslavia) Miroslav Glišović (1984)
- (Socialist Federal Republic of Yugoslavia) Dušan Nenković (1984–1985)
- (Socialist Federal Republic of Yugoslavia) Milorad Janković (1985)
- (Socialist Federal Republic of Yugoslavia) Josip Duvančić (1985–86)
- (Socialist Federal Republic of Yugoslavia) Zoran Čolaković (1986–87)
- (Socialist Federal Republic of Yugoslavia) Milan Živadinović (1987–88)
- (Socialist Federal Republic of Yugoslavia) Slobodan Halilović (1988–89)
- (Socialist Federal Republic of Yugoslavia) Dragan Pantelić (1989–90)
- (Socialist Federal Republic of Yugoslavia) Slobodan Halilović (1990–91)
- (Socialist Federal Republic of Yugoslavia) Nenad Cvetković (1991)
- (Socialist Federal Republic of Yugoslavia) Vladislav Nikolić (1991–92)
- (Federal Republic of Yugoslavia) Ljuborad Stevanović (1992–93)
- (Federal Republic of Yugoslavia) Milovan Đorić (1993)
- (Federal Republic of Yugoslavia) Zoran Banković (1993–94)
- (Federal Republic of Yugoslavia) Vladimir Milosavljević (1994)
- (Federal Republic of Yugoslavia) Miodrag Stefanović (1994–95)
- (Croatia) Josip Duvančić (1995)
- (Federal Republic of Yugoslavia) Milorad Janković (1995–96)
- (Federal Republic of Yugoslavia) Slobodan Halilović (1996–97)
- (Federal Republic of Yugoslavia) Miodrag Stefanović (1997)
- (Federal Republic of Yugoslavia) Mile Tomić (1997)
- (Federal Republic of Yugoslavia) Miodrag Stojiljković (1997)
- (Federal Republic of Yugoslavia) Vladislav Nikolić (1997–98)
- (Federal Republic of Yugoslavia) Miodrag Ješić (1998)
- (Bosnia and Herzegovina) Boško Antić (1998)
- (North Macedonia) Ilija Dimoski (1998–99)
- (Federal Republic of Yugoslavia) Radmilo Ivančević (1999)
- (Federal Republic of Yugoslavia) Boris Bunjak (1999)
- (Federal Republic of Yugoslavia) Zoran Čolaković (1999–00)
- (Federal Republic of Yugoslavia) Jovica Škoro (2000)
- (Federal Republic of Yugoslavia) Slobodan Pavković (2001)
- (Serbia and Montenegro) Tomislav Manojlović (2002)
- (Serbia and Montenegro) Boban Krstić (2002)
- (Serbia and Montenegro) Zoran Milenković (2003)
- (Serbia and Montenegro) Zoran Čolaković (2004)
- (Serbia and Montenegro) Ljuborad Stevanović (2004-05)
- (Serbia and Montenegro) Milan Jovin (2005)
- (Serbia and Montenegro) Boris Bunjak (2005)
- (Serbia and Montenegro) Zoran Milenković (2005)
- (North Macedonia) Boško Đurovski (2005-06)
- (Serbia) Zoran Čolaković (2006)
- (Serbia) Vladimir Jocić (2006)
- (Serbia) Milenko Kiković (2006)
- (Serbia) Slobodan Antonijević (2007–08)
- (Serbia) Vladislav Đukić (2008–09)
- (Serbia) Miodrag Stefanović (2009)
- (Serbia) Slavoljub Janković (2009)
- (Serbia) Aleksandar Ilić (2009–10)
- (Serbia) Aleksandar Kuzmanović (2010)
- (Serbia) Dragan Ilić (2011)
- (Serbia) Zvonko Đorđević (2011)
- (Serbia) Aleksandar Kuzmanović (2011–12)
- (Serbia) Aleksandar Ilić (Mar 26, 2012 – Feb 23, 2013)
- (Serbia) Saša Mrkić (Feb 23, 2013 – May 13, 2013)
- (Serbia) Dragoljub Bekvalac (Jul 1, 2013 – Mar 11, 2014)
- (Serbia) Milan Milanović (Mar 18, 2014 – Jun 24, 2014)
- (Serbia) Dragoslav Stepanović (Jul 7, 2014 – Sep 5, 2014)
- (Serbia) Saša Mrkić (Sep 8, 2014 – Dec 4, 2014)
- (Serbia) Milan Rastavac (Dec 30, 2014 – May 19, 2017)
- (Austria) Peter Pacult (Jun 12, 2017 – Aug 4, 2017)
- (Serbia) Ivan Jević (Aug 7, 2017 – Oct 19, 2017)
- (Serbia) Milan Đuričić (Oct 21, 2017 – Jan 1, 2018)
- (Serbia) Boban Dmitrović (Jan 5, 2018 – Mar 17, 2018)
- (Serbia) Dragan Antić (Mar 20, 2018 – Jun 1, 2018)
- (Serbia) Nenad Lalatović (Jun 1, 2018 – Jun 21, 2019)
- (Bosnia and Herzegovina) Simo Krunić (Jun 25, 2019 – Aug 20, 2019)
- (Serbia) Milorad Kosanović (Aug 20, 2019 – Feb 22, 2020)
- (Montenegro) Radoslav Batak (25 Feb 2020 – 6 Oct 2020)
- (Serbia) Milan Đuričić (6 Oct 2020–26 Nov 2020)
- (Bosnia and Herzegovina) Vladimir Gaćinović (27 Nov 2020–12 Apr 2021)
- (Serbia) Aleksandar Stanković (12 April 2021–7 Jun 2021)
- (Serbia) Nenad Lalatović (7 Jun 2021–24 Jun 2021)
- (Serbia) Aleksandar Stanković (26 Jun 2021–24 Aug 2021)
- (Serbia) Radomir Koković (1 Sep 2021–21 Sep 2021)
- (Serbia) Radoslav Batak (23 Sep 2021–1 Jun 2022)
- (Serbia) Tomislav Sivić (3 Jun 2022–14 Aug 2022)
- (Serbia) Saša Mrkić (15 Aug 2022–5 Sept 2022)
- (Serbia) Nenad Lalatović (5 Sep 2022–8 Mar 2023)
- (Serbia) Dragan Šarac (8 Mar 2023–1 Jun 2023)
- (Serbia) Vladimir Đorđević (1 Jun 2023-1 Jul 23)
- (Serbia) Nikola Trajković (12 Jun 2023-11 Nov 23)
- (Serbia) Slavoljub Đorđević (14 Nov 2023-26 Dec 23)
- (Serbia) Nikola Trajković (30 Dec 2023-10 Mar 24)
- (Serbia) Aleksandar Jovanović (11 Mar 2024 – 14 Mar 24)
- (Serbia) Dejan Joksimović (12 Mar 2024 – 1 Jun 24)
- (Montenegro) Nikola Drinčić (3 Jun 2024 – 2 Mar 25)
- (Cyprus) Siniša Dobrašinović (4 Mar 2025-2 Jun 25)
- (Serbia) Slavko Matić (9 Jun 2025-12 Aug 25)
- (Serbia) Tomislav Sivić (12 Aug 2025-4 Dec 25)
- (Greece) Takis Lemonis (10 Dec 2025-2026)

== Kit manufacturers and shirt sponsors ==
Period	Kit Manufacturer	Shirt Sponsor	Back shirt sponsor
2002–07	Lotto	—	
2007–11	Legea	—	
2011–12	Adidas	—	
2012–15	Legea	—	
2015–16	NAAI	—	
2016–2018	Hummel	Niška Pivara	
2018–2022	Macron	mt:s	
2022–2024	Beltona	mt:s	efbet
2024–present	Masita	mt:s	MaxBet
