= Goran Gavrilović =

Serbian footballer

Personal information
- Date of birth: 16 July 1963 (age 63)
- Place of birth: Belgrade, SR Serbia, SFR Yugoslavia
- Position: Goalkeeper

Youth career
- Partizan

Senior career*
Years	Team	Apps	(Gls)
1982–1983	Partizan	0	(0)
1982–1983	→ Beograd (loan)		
1983–1988	Radnički Niš	40	(0)
1988–1992	Proleter Zrenjanin	114	(0)
1992–1993	Gençlerbirliği	18	(0)
1993–1994	Proleter Zrenjanin	45	(0)
1995	Borac Čačak	4	(0)
1995–1997	Proleter Zrenjanin	43	(0)
Total		264	(0)
- * Club domestic league appearances and goals

Goran Gavrilović (Serbian Cyrillic: Горан Гавриловић; born 16 July 1963) is a Serbian former professional footballer who played as a goalkeeper.

== Playing career ==
After coming through the youth system at Partizan, Gavrilović spent five seasons with Radnički Niš (1983–1988), making 40 appearances in the Yugoslav First League. He also appeared once in the 1983–84 UEFA Cup, keeping a clean sheet in a 3–0 home win over St. Gallen.

In the summer of 1988, Gavrilović switched to Yugoslav Second League side Proleter Zrenjanin. He helped them win promotion to the Yugoslav First League in his second season. During his four-year stay at the club (1988–1992), Gavrilović collected 114 league appearances.

Following the breakup of Yugoslavia, Gavrilović moved abroad to Turkey and played for Gençlerbirliği in the 1992–93 1.Lig, making 18 appearances. He subsequently returned to Proleter Zrenjanin and stayed at the club until 1997, except for a brief spell with Borac Čačak in 1995.

== Post-playing career ==
After hanging up his boots, Gavrilović worked as a goalkeeping coach for Hajduk Beograd and Radnički Zrenjanin.

== Career statistics ==
Club	Season	League	
Club	Season	Apps	Goals
Radnički Niš	1983–84	4	0
Radnički Niš	1984–85	14	0
Radnički Niš	1985–86		
Radnički Niš	1986–87	6	0
Radnički Niš	1987–88	16	0
Radnički Niš	Total	40	0
Proleter Zrenjanin	1988–89	29	0
Proleter Zrenjanin	1989–90	32	0
Proleter Zrenjanin	1990–91	25	0
Proleter Zrenjanin	1991–92	28	0
Proleter Zrenjanin	Total	114	0
Gençlerbirliği	1992–93	18	0
Proleter Zrenjanin	1992–93	1	0
Proleter Zrenjanin	1993–94	27	0
Proleter Zrenjanin	1994–95	17	0
Proleter Zrenjanin	Total	45	0
Borac Čačak	1994–95	4	0
Proleter Zrenjanin	1995–96	27	0
Proleter Zrenjanin	1996–97	16	0
Proleter Zrenjanin	Total	43	0
Career total		264	0
