= Stevan Stefanović =

Serbian footballer

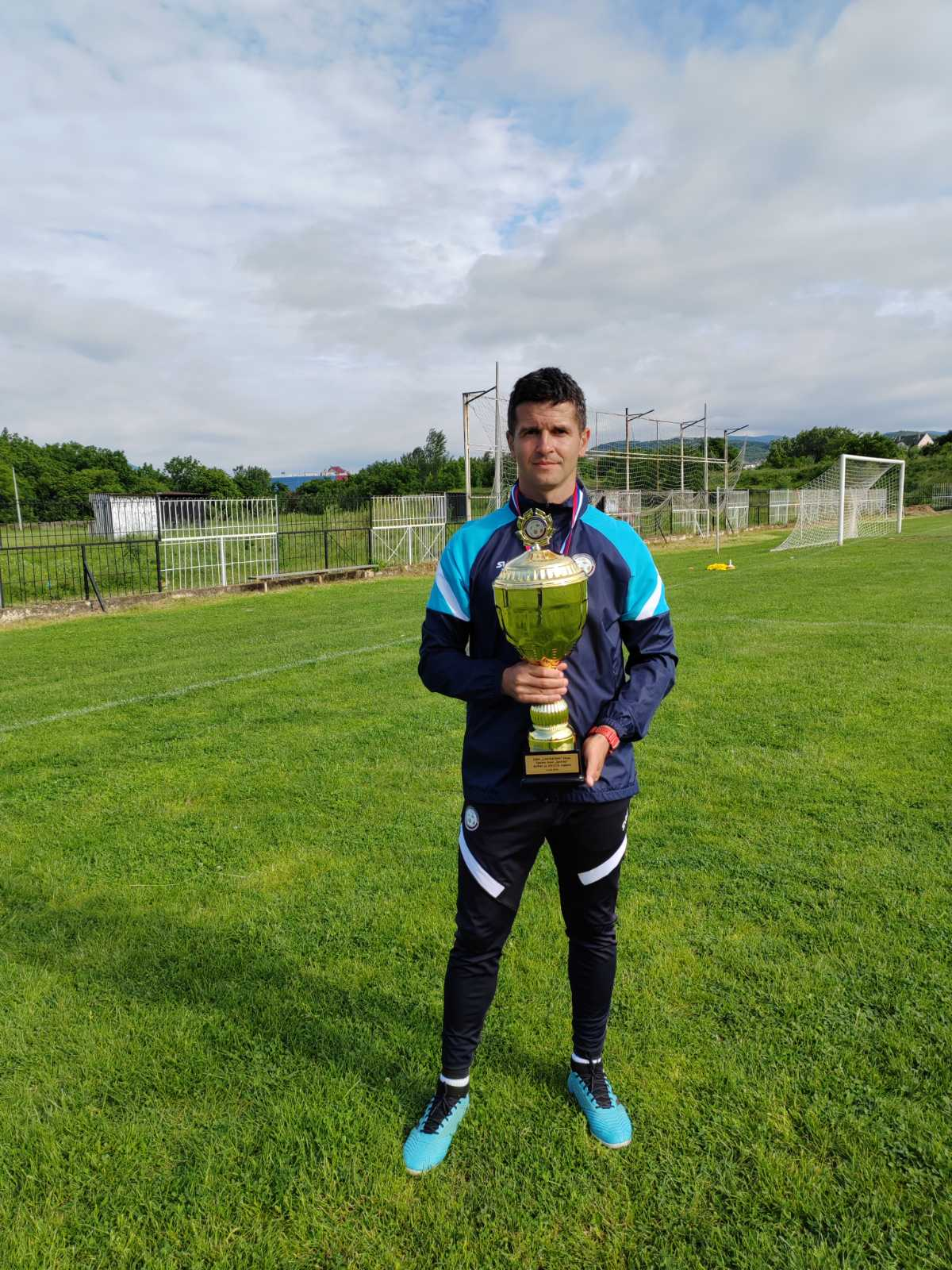

Personal information
- Full name: Stevan Stefanović
- Date of birth: 28 June 1984 (age 42)
- Place of birth: Niš, SFR Yugoslavia
- Height: 1.80 m (5 ft 11 in)
- Position: Midfielder

Senior career*
Years	Team	Apps	(Gls)
2001–2003	Sinđelić Niš		
2002–2003	Radnički Niš	9	(0)
2003–2004	Sinđelić Niš		
2004–2005	Pierikos		
2005–2008	Sinđelić Niš		
2008–2009	Radnički Niš		
2009–2010	Timok		
2010–2012	Radnički Niš	56	(11)
2012–2014	Radnički Niš	14	(0)
2014–2020	Car Konstantin		

Managerial career
- 2017–2018: Car Konstantin (U16)
- 2019–2020: Radnički Niš (U14)
- 2020–2021: Radnički Niš (U19)
- 2021–2022: Radnički Niš (U14)
- 2022–2023: Sinđelić Niš
- 2024–: Sinđelić Niš (U19)
- * Club domestic league appearances and goals as of 11 November 2012

Stevan Stefanović (Serbian Cyrillic: Стеван Стефановић; born 28 March 1984) is a football coach and former football player footballer.

He started his coaching career in 2017. In 2023, he introduced OFK Sindjelic to the Serbian league with a record number of victories. 28 wins, 2 draws, 165 goals.
