= Ilija Dimoski =

Yugoslav and Macedonian footballer (1939–2008)

Personal information
- Date of birth: 27 June 1939
- Place of birth: Prilep, Kingdom of Yugoslavia
- Date of death: 3 November 2008 (aged 69)
- Place of death: Niš, Serbia
- Height: 1.70 m (5 ft 7 in)
- Position: Defender

Youth career
- Pobeda

Senior career*
Years	Team	Apps	(Gls)
1957–1961	Pobeda		
1961–1974	Radnički Niš	323	(22)
1974–1975	Proleter Novi Sad		

Managerial career
- 1979–1981: Priština
- 1981–1982: Radnički Niš (assistant)
- 1982–1984: Radnički Niš
- 1984–1985: Vardar
- 1989: Footscray JUST
- 1989–1990: GOŠK-Jug
- 1992–1993: Priština
- 1993–1995: Pobeda
- 1995–1996: Vardar
- 1998: Radnički Niš
- 2001–2002: Rabotnički
- 2002–2003: Bregalnica Delčevo
- * Club domestic league appearances and goals

Ilija Dimoski (Macedonian: Илија Димоски; 27 June 1939 – 3 November 2008) was a Yugoslav and Macedonian football manager and player.

== Playing career ==
Born in Zabrčani, a village near Prilep, Dimoski started out at local club Pobeda, helping them win promotion to the Yugoslav Second League in 1959. He made 42 appearances over the next two seasons, attracting attention from other clubs.

In the summer of 1961, Dimoski was transferred to league rivals Radnički Niš. He became a regular starter in his first year, helping the club win promotion to the Yugoslav First League. Over the following 12 seasons, Dimoski amassed over 300 appearances in the top flight, scoring 22 times. He also set the Yugoslav First League record for most own goals, with seven. Before retiring, Dimoski briefly played for lower league club Proleter Novi Sad.

== Managerial career ==
After serving as an assistant to Dušan Nenković, Dimoski was appointed as manager of Radnički Niš in the summer of 1982. He led the team to a fourth-place finish in his first season in charge, earning a spot in the 1983–84 UEFA Cup. On 31 March 1984, Dimoski was relieved from his duties as the club's manager.

In 1989, Dimoski spent some time in Australia as manager of National Soccer League side Footscray JUST. He subsequently returned to Yugoslavia as manager of Second League club GOŠK-Jug.

During the late 1990s and early 2000s, Dimoski served as manager of a number of Macedonian clubs, including Rabotnički and Bregalnica Delčevo.

== Career statistics ==
Appearances and goals by club, season and competition
Club	Season	League	
Club	Season	Apps	Goals
Pobeda	1959–60	22	0
Pobeda	1960–61	20	0
Pobeda	Total	42	0
Radnički Niš	1961–62	22	0
Radnički Niš	1962–63	22	1
Radnički Niš	1963–64	23	2
Radnički Niš	1964–65	28	4
Radnički Niš	1965–66	5	0
Radnički Niš	1966–67	10	2
Radnički Niš	1967–68	27	2
Radnički Niš	1968–69	34	2
Radnički Niš	1969–70	32	4
Radnički Niš	1970–71	29	1
Radnički Niš	1971–72	27	1
Radnički Niš	1972–73	31	0
Radnički Niš	1973–74	33	3
Radnički Niš	Total	323	22
Career total		365	22
