= Ljubiša Rajković =

Yugoslav and Serbian footballer

Personal information
- Full name: Ljubiša Rajković
- Date of birth: 3 October 1950 (age 76)
- Place of birth: Niš, PR Serbia, FPR Yugoslavia
- Height: 1.85 m (6 ft 1 in)
- Position: Defender

Youth career
- 1965–1967: Radnički Niš

Senior career*
Years	Team	Apps	(Gls)
1967–1979	Radnički Niš	285	(1)
1979–1981	Bastia	46	(0)
Total		331	(1)

International career
1968–1969	Yugoslavia U18	7	(0)
1970–1977	Yugoslavia	14	(0)
- * Club domestic league appearances and goals

Ljubiša Rajković (Serbian Cyrillic: Љубиша Рајковић; born 3 October 1950) is a Yugoslav and Serbian former professional footballer who played as a defender.

== Club career ==
Born in Donja Trnava, a village near Niš, Rajković made his senior debut with Radnički Niš in the 1967–68 season. He was a regular member of the team for 12 years, helping the club win the Balkans Cup in 1975. In the summer of 1979, Rajković moved abroad to France and signed with Bastia, spending there the final two years of his career.

== International career ==
Between 1970 and 1977, Rajković was capped 14 times for Yugoslavia. He also represented the nation in two UEFA European Under-18 Championship tournaments, in 1968 and 1969.

== Career statistics ==
=== Club ===
Appearances and goals by club, season and competition
Club	Season	League		
Club	Season	Division	Apps	Goals
Radnički Niš	1967–68	Yugoslav First League	4	0
Radnički Niš	1968–69	Yugoslav First League	26	0
Radnički Niš	1969–70	Yugoslav First League	34	0
Radnički Niš	1970–71	Yugoslav First League	31	1
Radnički Niš	1971–72	Yugoslav First League	32	0
Radnički Niš	1972–73	Yugoslav First League	33	0
Radnički Niš	1973–74	Yugoslav First League	16	0
Radnički Niš	1974–75	Yugoslav First League	28	0
Radnički Niš	1975–76	Yugoslav First League	32	0
Radnički Niš	1976–77	Yugoslav First League	26	0
Radnički Niš	1977–78	Yugoslav First League	8	0
Radnički Niš	1978–79	Yugoslav First League	15	0
Radnički Niš	Total		285	1
Bastia	1979–80	French Division 1	24	0
Bastia	1980–81	French Division 1	22	0
Bastia	Total		46	0
Career total			331	1

=== International ===
Appearances and goals by national team and year
National team	Year	Apps	Goals
Yugoslavia	1970	4	0
Yugoslavia	1971	5	0
Yugoslavia	1972	1	0
Yugoslavia	1973	0	0
Yugoslavia	1974	1	0
Yugoslavia	1975	0	0
Yugoslavia	1976	0	0
Yugoslavia	1977	3	0
Total		14	0

== Honours ==
Radnički Niš

- Balkans Cup: 1975
