= Aleksandar Jovanović (footballer, born 1985) =

Serbian footballer

Personal information
- Date of birth: 17 December 1985 (age 40)
- Place of birth: Niš, SFR Yugoslavia
- Height: 1.79 m (5 ft 10 in)
- Position: Midfielder

Senior career*
| Years | Team | Apps | (Gls) |
| 2002–2005 | OFK Niš | 67 | (8) |
| 2005–2006 | OFK Beograd | 0 | (0) |
| 2006 | → OFK Niš (loan) | 16 | (1) |
| 2006–2007 | OFK Niš | | |
| 2007–2009 | Radnički Niš | 31 | (3) |
| 2009–2011 | Sinđelić Niš | 32 | (4) |
| 2011–2019 | Radnički Niš | 218 | (14) |
| 2019–2021 | Kolubara | 48 | (5) |

Managerial career
- 2024: Radnički Niš (caretaker)
- * Club domestic league appearances and goals

Aleksandar Jovanović (Serbian Cyrillic: Александар Јовановић; born 17 December 1985) is a Serbian retired footballer who played as a midfielder.

== Career ==
During his career, Jovanović played almost exclusively in his hometown and represented OFK Niš, Sinđelić Niš, and most notably, Radnički Niš. He had two spells with Radnički between 2007 and 2019. In his second tenure at the club, Jovanović initially helped them return to the top flight after a decade (2012) and later secure a spot in European competitions after more than 30 years (2018). He also served as the team's captain, before leaving Radnički at the end of his contract in July 2019.

== Statistics ==
| Club | Season | League | |
| Club | Season | Apps | Goals |
|---|---|---|---|
| Radnički Niš | 2007–08 | 31 | 3 |
| Radnički Niš | 2008–09 | | |
| Sinđelić Niš | 2009–10 | | |
| Sinđelić Niš | 2010–11 | 32 | 4 |
| Radnički Niš | 2011–12 | 33 | 2 |
| Radnički Niš | 2012–13 | 29 | 5 |
| Radnički Niš | 2013–14 | 27 | 2 |
| Radnički Niš | 2014–15 | 27 | 0 |
| Radnički Niš | 2015–16 | 28 | 2 |
| Radnički Niš | 2016–17 | 30 | 1 |
| Radnički Niš | 2017–18 | 32 | 1 |
| Radnički Niš | 2018–19 | 12 | 1 |
| Career total | | 281 | 21 |

== Honours ==
Radnički Niš

- Serbian First League: 2011–12
- Serbian League East: 2008–09

Sinđelić Niš

- Serbian League East: 2009–10
