= Nenad Jakšić =

Serbian footballer

Personal information
- Full name: Nenad Jakšić
- Date of birth: 12 October 1965 (age 61)
- Place of birth: Vranje, SR Serbia, SFR Yugoslavia
- Height: 1.84 m (6 ft 0 in)
- Position: Midfielder

Youth career
- Dinamo Vranje

Senior career*
Years	Team	Apps	(Gls)
1987–1992	Radnički Niš	158	(24)
1992–1993	Pezoporikos	26	(6)
1993–1994	Omonia Aradippou	24	(3)
1994–1995	PAS Giannina		
1995–1996	Veria		
1997	Loznica	5	(0)
- * Club domestic league appearances and goals

Nenad Jakšić (Serbian Cyrillic: Ненад Јакшић; born 12 October 1965) is a Serbian former professional footballer who played as a midfielder.

== Club career ==
Jakšić started out at his hometown club Dinamo Vranje, before joining Radnički Niš. He spent five seasons with the club between 1987 and 1992, making 158 appearances and scoring 24 goals in the Yugoslav First League. He later went on to play abroad in Cyprus and Greece.

== International career ==
At international level, Jakšić was selected to represent Yugoslavia at the 1988 Summer Olympics, but remained an unused substitute.

== Post-playing career ==
After hanging up his boots, Jakšić served as president of his childhood club Dinamo Vranje from January to August 2009.

== Career statistics ==
Appearances and goals by club, season and competition
Club	Season	League		
Club	Season	Division	Apps	Goals
Radnički Niš	1987–88	Yugoslav First League	33	6
Radnički Niš	1988–89	Yugoslav First League	32	7
Radnički Niš	1989–90	Yugoslav First League	33	0
Radnički Niš	1990–91	Yugoslav First League	29	5
Radnički Niš	1991–92	Yugoslav First League	31	6
Radnički Niš	Total		158	24
