= Zoran Čolaković =

Serbian football manager and player (born 1940)

Personal information
- Date of birth: 16 November 1940 (age 85)
- Place of birth: Niš, Kingdom of Yugoslavia
- Position: Defender

Youth career
- Dinamo Niš

Senior career*
Years	Team	Apps	(Gls)
1962–1967	Železničar Niš	115	(6)
1967–1973	Radnički Niš	165	(6)
Total		280	(12)

Managerial career
- 1979–1981: Teteks
- 1981–1982: Sloboda Titovo Užice
- 1985–1986: Novi Pazar
- 1986–1987: Radnički Niš
- 1987–1988: Novi Pazar
- 1989–1990: Konyaspor
- 1991–1992: Pobeda
- 1992: Jastrebac Niš
- 1993: Sloga Kraljevo
- 1993: Topličanin
- 1995: Novi Pazar
- 1995–1997: Bor
- 1997–1998: Priština
- 1999–2000: Radnički Niš
- 2004: Radnički Niš
- 2006: Radnički Niš
- * Club domestic league appearances and goals

Zoran Čolaković (Serbian Cyrillic: Зоран Чолаковић; born 16 November 1940) is a Serbian former football manager and player.

== Playing career ==
Čolaković played for Železničar Niš in the Yugoslav Second League from 1962 to 1967, before joining crosstown rivals Radnički Niš. He spent six seasons with the club and made 165 appearances in the Yugoslav First League between 1967 and 1973.

== Managerial career ==
After hanging up his boots, Čolaković was manager of Novi Pazar and Radnički Niš on several occasions. He was also manager of Turkish club Konyaspor.

== Honours ==
Teteks

- Yugoslav Second League: 1980–81 (Group East)
