= Milorad Janković =

Serbian footballer (1940–2020)

Personal information
- Date of birth: 10 August 1940
- Place of birth: Jakovac, Kingdom of Yugoslavia
- Date of death: 24 December 2020 (aged 80)
- Position: Striker

Senior career*
Years	Team	Apps	(Gls)
1964–1974	Radnički Niš	263	(63)

International career
1966	Yugoslavia	1	(0)

Managerial career
- 1985: Radnički Niš
- 1995–1996: Radnički Niš
- * Club domestic league appearances and goals

Milorad Janković (10 August 1940 – 24 December 2020) was a Yugoslav footballer who played at both professional and international levels as a striker. He played club football for Radnički Niš between 1964 and 1974, and earned one cap for Yugoslavia in November 1966 against Bulgaria.

== Death ==
He died on 24 December 2020, at the age of 80.
