= Zoran Banković =

Serbian footballer

Personal information
- Date of birth: 22 September 1956 (age 70)
- Place of birth: Leskovac, PR Serbia, FPR Yugoslavia
- Position: Defender

Youth career
- Dubočica

Senior career*
Years	Team	Apps	(Gls)
1973–1979	Dubočica	109	(6)
1979–1983	Vardar	103	(3)
1983–1984	Red Star Belgrade	29	(3)
1985–1989	Radnički Niš	125	(8)
1989–1990	Altay	5	(0)
1990–1991	OFK Beograd	21	(0)
1991–1992	Jastrebac Niš		
1993–1994	Radnički Niš	36	(4)
Total		428	(24)

International career
1978	Yugoslavia Amateurs	1	(0)

Managerial career
- 1994: Radnički Niš (player-manager)
- * Club domestic league appearances and goals

Zoran Banković (Serbian Cyrillic: Зоран Банковић; born 22 September 1956) is a Serbian former professional footballer who played as a defender.

== Club career ==
A childhood fan of Partizan, Banković started out at his hometown club Dubočica, helping them reach the Yugoslav Second League in 1975. He was transferred to Yugoslav First League side Vardar in 1979, making more than 100 appearances over four seasons in the top flight. In the summer of 1983, Banković signed with Red Star Belgrade, winning the 1983–84 Yugoslav First League title. He left the club in the 1985 transfer window and went to Radnički Niš.

In 1989, Banković moved abroad to Turkey and briefly played for Altay in the top flight. He subsequently returned to his homeland, spending some time with OFK Beograd and Jastrebac Niš. In the 1993 winter transfer window, Banković rejoined Radnički Niš. He served as the club's player-manager in early 1994.

== International career ==
At international level, Banković represented Yugoslavia at the UEFA Amateur Cup in 1978.

== Honours ==
Red Star Belgrade

- Yugoslav First League: 1983–84

Radnički Niš

- Yugoslav Second League: 1985–86 (Group East)
