= Ivan Krstić (footballer) =

Serbian footballer

Personal information
- Full name: Ivan Krstić
- Date of birth: 29 June 1980
- Date of death: 29 May 2000 (aged 19)
- Place of death: Niš, Serbia, FR Yugoslavia
- Position: Midfielder

Youth career
- 1989–1999: Radnički Niš

Senior career*
Years	Team	Apps	(Gls)
1999–2000	Radnički Niš	34	(4)

International career
- Yugoslavia U21
- * Club domestic league appearances and goals

Ivan "Beli" Krstić (Serbian Cyrillic: Иван Бели Крстић; 30 June 1980 – 29 May 2000) was a Serbian footballer who played for FK Radnički Niš.

Krstić started playing for Radnički at the age of 9, eventually joining the first team and becoming captain. He also represented the Yugoslavia U21 national team.

On 29 May 2000, Krstić was struck by lightning during training and was killed instantly. He was 19 years old. In his honour, the youth academy of Radnički is named after him and his shirt number 10 has been retired by the club.

== See also ==
- List of association footballers who died while playing
