= Niš Football Subassociation =

The Niš Football Subassociation, known as NLP, (Serbo-Croato-Slovenian: Niški loptački podsavez / Нишки лоптачки подсавез - НЛП) was one of the regional football governing bodies under the tutorial of the Football Association of Yugoslavia. It was formed on 8 March 1931 having been part of the Belgrade Football Subassociation until then.

It included the clubs from the municipalities of Niš, Kruševac, Zaječar, Negotin, Bor, Knjaževac, and Leskovac which was part of the Skoplje Football Subassociation. The Subassociation counts 35 clubs in 1937, and 52 in 1940.

The presidents of the Niš Football Subassociation were Bogoljub Petrović (1931 - 1933), Vasa Bukva (1933 - 1934), Agor Agorić (1934 - 1936), Vlada Zamfirović (1936 - 1940) and Đura Spasić (1940 - 1941).

== Seasons and champions ==
- 1932: Sinđelić Niš
- 1933: Građanski Niš. Note: The clubs that played in the 1932–33 Yugoslav Football Championship did not participated, as the two leagues were played simultaneously and the BLP had a qualifying character for the next season.
- 1934: Građanski Niš
- 1935:
- 1936: Građanski Niš
- 1937: Note: It was adopted a system where the clubs competing in the national championship do not compete at subassociation level as well.
- 1938: Obilić Kruševac
- 1939: Železničar Niš
- 1940: Car Lazar Kruševac
- 1941: Železničar Niš
