= Slobodan Halilović =

Yugoslav and Serbian football manager and player

Personal information
- Date of birth: 1 January 1951 (age 75)
- Place of birth: Banovići, PR Bosnia and Herzegovina, FPR Yugoslavia
- Position: Defender

Youth career
- 1958–1967: Budućnost Banovići

Senior career*
| Years | Team | Apps | (Gls) |
| 1967–1971 | Budućnost Banovići | | |
| 1971–1983 | Radnički Niš | 231 | (11) |

Managerial career
- 1983–1985: Mladost Niš
- 1985–1987: Radnički Niš (assistant)
- 1987–1988: Mladost Niš
- 1988–1989: Radnički Niš
- 1990–1991: Radnički Niš
- 1991–1992: Al Wahda
- 1992–1996: Al Wahda (youth)
- 1996–1997: Radnički Niš
- 1997–1999: Mogren
- 1999–2003: Al Wahda (youth)
- 2003–2005: Mogren
- 2006–2007: Dinamo Vranje
- 2007: Zeta
- 2008: Jedinstvo Bijelo Polje
- 2009: Sinđelić Niš
- 2010: Al Dhafra
- 2010–2011: Al Wahda (youth)
- 2012: Lovćen
- 2013: Sinđelić Niš
- 2015: Lovćen
- 2017: Cetinje
- 2018–2020: Jedinstvo Bijelo Polje
- 2022: Timok
- 2024: Radnik Surdulica
- * Club domestic league appearances and goals

Slobodan Halilović (Serbian Cyrillic: Слободан Халиловић; born 1 January 1951) is a Yugoslav and Serbian football manager and former player.

== Playing career ==
After starting out at his hometown club Budućnost Banovići, Halilović played for Radnički Niš from 1971 to 1983, making 231 appearances and scoring 11 goals in the Yugoslav First League. He also helped them win the Balkans Cup in 1975.

== Managerial career ==
In the summer of 1988, Halilović became manager of Radnički Niš for the first time, remaining in charge until late 1989. He returned to the post in the spring of 1990.

In February 2010, Halilović was appointed as manager of Emirati club Al Dhafra. He spent one month in charge before being replaced by Swiss manager Michel Decastel.

After his second stint at Sinđelić Niš, Halilović returned to Montenegro and served as manager of Lovćen (July–October 2015), Cetinje (June–September 2017), and Jedinstvo Bijelo Polje (March 2018–December 2020).

== Career statistics ==
| Club | Season | League | |
| Club | Season | Apps | Goals |
|---|---|---|---|
| Radnički Niš | 1970–71 | 4 | 0 |
| Radnički Niš | 1971–72 | 2 | 0 |
| Radnički Niš | 1972–73 | 0 | 0 |
| Radnički Niš | 1973–74 | 8 | 0 |
| Radnički Niš | 1974–75 | 32 | 3 |
| Radnički Niš | 1975–76 | 25 | 1 |
| Radnički Niš | 1976–77 | 32 | 3 |
| Radnički Niš | 1977–78 | 17 | 0 |
| Radnički Niš | 1978–79 | 17 | 1 |
| Radnički Niš | 1979–80 | 21 | 0 |
| Radnički Niš | 1980–81 | 28 | 2 |
| Radnički Niš | 1981–82 | 24 | 1 |
| Radnički Niš | 1982–83 | 21 | 0 |
| Radnički Niš | Total | 231 | 11 |
| Career total | | 231 | 11 |

== Honours ==
Radnički Niš

- Balkans Cup: 1975
