= Aleksandar Ilić (footballer, born 1969) =

Serbian footballer and manager (born 1969)

Personal information
- Full name: Aleksandar Ilić
- Date of birth: 26 June 1969 (age 57)
- Place of birth: Niš, SFR Yugoslavia
- Height: 1.87 m (6 ft 2 in)
- Position: Defender

Youth career
- Radnički Niš

Senior career*
Years	Team	Apps	(Gls)
1990–1991	Red Star Belgrade	1	(0)
1990–1991	→ Radnički Beograd (dual)	17	(0)
1991–1992	Radnički Beograd	32	(0)
1992–1995	Radnički Niš	56	(3)
1994	→ Cádiz (loan)	23	(1)
1995–1997	Paniliakos	63	(5)
1997–2000	Club Brugge	66	(8)
2000–2003	Anderlecht	62	(3)
2004	Vitesse	18	(0)
2004–2005	Brussels	4	(0)
Total		342	(20)

Managerial career
- 2007: Paniliakos
- 2009–2010: Radnički Niš
- 2010–2011: Al-Ahli (assistant)
- 2011: Al-Ahli
- 2012–2013: Radnički Niš
- 2013: Al-Ahli
- 2016: Al-Raed
- 2018: Al-Raed
- 2019–2020: Al-Shorta
- 2020–2021: Al-Shorta
- 2022: Al-Qadsiah
- 2022–2023: Lebanon
- 2024: Al-Arabi
- 2024: Al-Tai
- * Club domestic league appearances and goals

Aleksandar Ilić (Serbian Cyrillic: Александар Илић; born 26 June 1969) is a Serbian professional football coach and former player.

== Playing career ==
In 1999, Ilić was loaned out to Cádiz. He signed for SBV Vitesse in January 2004.

== Managerial career ==
In January 2022, Ilić was appointed head coach of Al-Qadsiah. He became head coach of the Lebanon national team on 3 August 2022, and was dismissed on 2 October 2023.

On 24 January 2024, Ilić was appointed as manager of Saudi First Division side Al-Arabi. He was sacked on 1 May 2024.

On 12 July 2024, Ilić was appointed as manager of Al-Tai. He was sacked by the club on 12 October 2024.

== Career statistics ==
=== Managerial ===
As of match played 10 September 2023

Managerial record by team and tenure
Team	From	To	Record					Ref.
Team	From	To	P	W	D	L	Win %	Ref.
Paniliakos	2 March 2007	30 June 2007	10	4	1	5	40.0	
Al-Ahli	25 February 2011	30 June 2011	14	7	4	3	50.0	
FK Radnički Niš	26 March 2012	23 February 2013	30	11	9	10	36.7	
Al-Ahli	28 February 2013	30 June 2013	14	8	4	2	57.1	
Al-Raed	5 February 2016	17 June 2016	17	6	3	8	35.3	
Al-Raed	4 February 2018	25 July 2018	12	7	1	4	58.3	
Al-Shorta	8 August 2019	18 February 2020	13	5	3	5	38.5	
Al-Shorta	9 December 2020	26 July 2021	41	20	10	11	48.8	
Al-Qadsiah	8 January 2022	31 May 2022	20	8	6	6	40.0	
Lebanon	3 August 2022	2 October 2023	13	5	3	5	38.5	
Al-Arabi	24 January 2024	1 May 2024	12	7	3	2	58.3	
Al-Tai	12 July 2024	12 October 2024	7	3	2	2	42.9	
Total			199	88	48	63	44.2	—

== Honours ==
=== Player ===
Club Brugge

- Belgian First Division: 1997–98
- Belgian Cup: 1995-96
- Belgian Super Cup: 1996, 1998

Anderlecht

- Belgian First Division: 2000–01
- Belgian Super Cup: 2000, 2001

=== Manager ===
Al-Ahli

- King Cup of Champions: 2011

Radnički Niš

- Serbian First League: 2011–12

Al-Shorta

- Iraqi Super Cup: 2019
