= Zoran Vasković =

Serbian footballer

Personal information
- Full name: Zoran Vasković
- Date of birth: 14 February 1979 (age 47)
- Place of birth: Niš, SFR Yugoslavia
- Height: 1.85 m (6 ft 1 in)
- Position: Goalkeeper

Youth career
- Radnički Niš

Senior career*
Years	Team	Apps	(Gls)
1998–2002	Radnički Niš	66	(0)
2002–2003	Lommel	1	(0)
2003–2004	Radnički Niš	21	(0)
2004–2005	Pobeda	0	(0)
2005–2007	Vlasina	55	(0)
2007–2009	Jagodina	37	(0)
2010	Radnički Niš	17	(0)
2010	Napredak Kruševac	6	(0)
2011–2013	Radnički Niš	32	(0)
Total		235	(0)

International career
2000	FR Yugoslavia U21	2	(0)
- * Club domestic league appearances and goals

Zoran Vasković (Serbian Cyrillic: Зоран Васковић; born 14 February 1979) is a Serbian retired footballer who played as a goalkeeper. He spent the majority of his career at his hometown club Radnički Niš. In 2000, Vasković earned two caps for FR Yugoslavia at under-21 level.
