= FK Radnik Surdulica =

Serbian football club

Radnik Surdulica
- Full name: FK Radnik Surdulica
- Founded: 1926; 100 years ago
- Ground: Surdulica City Stadium
- Capacity: 3,312
- President: Stanislav Tončev
- Head coach: Zoran Rendulić
- League: Serbian SuperLiga
- 2025–26: Serbian SuperLiga, 7th of 16
- Website: fkradnik.com
Home colours	Away colours

FK Radnik Surdulica (Serbian Cyrillic: ФК Радник Сурдулица) is a professional football club based in Surdulica, Serbia. They compete in the Serbian SuperLiga, the top tier of Serbian football.

== History ==
The club was founded as Surdulički sportski klub (SSK) in 1926 on the initiative of Gradimir Antić, a local shoemaker, who brought the first football ball to Surdulica. They stopped operating with the onset of World War II and Axis occupation of Serbia. In 1946, the club was reestablished as FK Polet on the initiative of Borivoje Milenković and Božidar Stanković. They subsequently changed their name to FK Hidrovlasina in 1950. Later the same year, the club merged with FK Molidben from Belo Polje and was named FK Radnik.

In July 2008, the club merged with FK Železničar from Vranjska Banja, taking its spot in the Serbian League East. They spent the next five seasons in the third tier of Serbian football. After winning the title in 2013, the club was promoted to the Serbian First League. They spent the next two seasons in the second tier before placing first in the 2014–15 Serbian First League and earning promotion to the Serbian SuperLiga for the first time in their history. In the 2020–21 season, the club achieved its highest ever league finish of sixth place and also reached the semi-finals of the national cup.

== Honours ==
- Serbian First League (Tier 2)
  - 2014–15, 2024–25
- Serbian League East (Tier 3)
  - 2012–13

== Seasons ==
Season	League									Cup
Season	Division	Pld	W	D	L	GF	GA	Pts	Pos	Cup
Serbia
2008–09	3 – East	28	8	7	13	31	35	31	12th	—
2009–10	3 – East	30	10	8	12	42	41	38	7th	—
2010–11	3 – East	30	14	4	12	43	35	46	3rd	—
2011–12	3 – East	30	14	6	10	55	48	48	4th	—
2012–13	3 – East	30	21	3	6	62	34	65 (Note: The club was docked one point.)	1st	—
2013–14	2	30	10	8	12	31	36	38	10th	—
2014–15	2	30	19	7	4	41	14	64	1st	Round of 32
2015–16	1	37	11	11	15	41	65	25	8th	Round of 32
2016–17	1	37	9	10	18	35	48	25	12th	Round of 16
2017–18	1	37	13	7	17	42	60	28	9th	Round of 32
2018–19	1	37	13	8	16	38	45	28	9th	Quarter-finals
2019–20	1	30 (Note: The season was shortened due to the COVID-19 pandemic in Serbia.)	8	7	15	34	50	31	11th	Quarter-finals
2020–21	1	38	16	7	15	55	49	55	6th	Semi-finals
2021–22	1	37	12	15	10	37	37	51	9th	Round of 16
2022–23	1	37	8	11	18	28	50	35	15th	Quarter-finals
2023–24	1	37	3	9	25	24	59	18	16th	Round of 32
2024-25	2	37	23	9	5	64	19	78	1st	Round of 16

== Players ==
=== First-team squad ===
As of 31 August 2026

Note: Flags indicate national team as defined under FIFA eligibility rules; some limited exceptions apply. Players may hold more than one non-FIFA nationality.

No.	Pos.	Nation	Player
1	GK	SRB	Filip Samurović
2	DF	GAM	Tijan Sonha
3	MF	SRB	Luka Zorić
5	MF	SRB	Miloš Popović (captain)
6	DF	SRB	David Stojanović
7	MF	SRB	Darko Stojanović
9	FW	SRB	Vukašin Bogdanović
10	MF	JPN	Ryonosuke Ohori
11	MF	SLO	Tom Kljun
14	DF	SRB	Uroš Ilić
15	DF	SRB	Veljko Bogdanović
17	MF	SRB	Nikola Pavlović
18	MF	SRB	Filip Žunić
20	MF	SRB	Luka Jovanović
21	DF	SRB	Uroš Filipović
22	DF	SRB	Uroš Lazić

No.	Pos.	Nation	Player
23	GK	SRB	Lazar Radojičić
25	MF	BIH	Teo Lakić
27	FW	SRB	Miloš Spasić
28	MF	SRB	Aleksandar Pejović
29	MF	UZB	Otabek Shukurov
30	MF	SRB	Martin Novaković
34	DF	BIH	Nikša Blagojević
37	DF	GHA	Sadick Abubakar
45	DF	BRA	Rafael Pontelo
47	MF	GHA	Emmanuel Quarshie
49	FW	BIH	Darije Markočević
55	FW	MKD	Martin Djangarovski
88	MF	SRB	Đorđe Jovanović
92	FW	LBR	Ayouba Kosiah
99	GK	SRB	Stefan Ranđelović

=== Out on loan ===
Note: Flags indicate national team as defined under FIFA eligibility rules; some limited exceptions apply. Players may hold more than one non-FIFA nationality.

No.	Pos.	Nation	Player
—	MF	SRB	Uroš Filimonović (at Torlak until the end of the 2026–27 season)
—	MF	SRB	Stefan Vidaković (at Proleter 023 until the end of the 2026–27 season)

No.	Pos.	Nation	Player
—	MF	SRB	Andrija Milićević (at Loznica until the end of the 2026–27 season)

=== Coaching staff ===
Position	Name
Head coach	(Serbia) Zoran Rendulić
First assistant coach	(Serbia) Predrag Ranđelović
Fitness coach	(Serbia) Boban Cenić
Goalkeeper coach	(Serbia) Dušan Đokić
Secretary of the coaching staff	(Serbia) Aleksandar Ivanović
Economist	(Serbia) Slobodan Jovanović
Physiotherapist	(Serbia) Ivana Tasić (Serbia) Brankica Tasić
Doctor	(Serbia) Danilo Popović (Serbia) Aleksandar Tasić

=== Notable players ===
This is a list of players who have played at full international level.

- (Armenia) Ognjen Čančarević
- (Ghana) Samuel Owusu
- (Indonesia) Witan Sulaeman
- (Montenegro) Milan Purović
- (Montenegro) Nedeljko Vlahović
- (Serbia) Nenad Lukić
- (Serbia) Milan Makarić
- (Serbia) Miljan Mutavdžić
- (Serbia) Miloš Simonović
- (Serbia) Nemanja Tomić
- (Serbia and Montenegro) Aleksandar Pantić

For a list of all FK Radnik Surdulica players with a Wikipedia article, see Category:FK Radnik Surdulica players.

== Managerial history ==
Period	Name
2011	(Serbia) Goran Jocić
2011	(Serbia) Branislav Stošić
2012	(Serbia) Dragan Antić
2012	(Serbia) Dragan Nikolić
2012	(Serbia) Ljubomir Crnokrak
2012	(Serbia) Goran Jocić (caretaker)
2013	(Bosnia and Herzegovina) Cvijetin Blagojević
2013	(Serbia) Žarko Đurović
2013–2014	(Serbia) Saša Nikolić
2014	(Serbia) Neško Milovanović
2014–2015	(Serbia) Mladen Milinković
2015–2016	(Serbia) Miloš Veselinović
2016	(Serbia) Goran Lazarević

Period	Name
2016	(Serbia) Neško Milovanović
2016	(Serbia) Milorad Kosanović
2017	(Serbia) Bratislav Živković
2017–2018	(Bosnia and Herzegovina) Simo Krunić
2018	(Serbia) Mladen Dodić
2018	(Serbia) Goran Jocić (caretaker)
2018–2019	(Serbia) Milan Milanović
2019	(Serbia) Slaviša Božičić
2019	(Serbia) Nenad Vanić
2019–2020	(Bosnia and Herzegovina) Simo Krunić
2020	(Serbia) Dejan Đuričić (caretaker)
2020–2021	(Serbia) Slavoljub Đorđević
2021	(Serbia) Igor Bondžulić

Period	Name
2021–2022	(Serbia) Dušan Đorđević
2022	(Serbia) Aleksandar Linta
2022	(Serbia) Nikola Stojanović (caretaker)
2022	(Montenegro) Dragan Radojičić
2022	(Serbia) Dragan Perišić
2022	(Bosnia and Herzegovina) Simo Krunić
2022–2023	(Serbia) Slavoljub Đorđević
2023	(Serbia) Zoran Ljubinković
2023	(Serbia) Milan Milanović
2024	(Serbia) Dušan Đorđević
2024	(Serbia) Dejan Đuričić (caretaker)
2024	(Serbia) Slobodan Halilović
