= 1961–62 Yugoslav Second League =

Yugoslav Second League
- Season: 1961–62
- Champions: Željezničar Sarajevo (West Division); Budućnost (East Division)
- Promoted: Željezničar Sarajevo; Sloboda; Budućnost; Radnički Niš
- Relegated: Radnički Sombor

The 1961–62 Yugoslav Second League season was the 16th season of the Second Federal League (Serbo-Croatian: Druga savezna liga), the second level association football competition of SFR Yugoslavia, since its establishment in 1946. The league was contested in two regional groups (West Division and East Division), with 12 clubs each.

== West Division ==
=== Teams ===
A total of twelve teams contested the league, including nine sides from the 1960–61 season, one club relegated from the 1960–61 Yugoslav First League and two sides promoted from the third tier leagues played in the 1960–61 season. The league was contested in a double round robin format, with each club playing every other club twice, for a total of 22 rounds. Two points were awarded for wins and one point for draws.

RNK Split were relegated from the 1960–61 Yugoslav First League after finishing in the 11th place of the league table. The two clubs promoted to the second level were Borovo and Maribor.

Locations of teams' home cities in the 1961–62 Yugoslav Second League West

Team	Location	Federal subject	Position in 1960–61
Borovo	Borovo Naselje	SR Croatia	—
Čelik	Zenica	SR Bosnia and Herzegovina	4th
Karlovac	Karlovac	SR Croatia	10th
Lokomotiva	Zagreb	SR Croatia	7th
Maribor	Maribor	SR Slovenia	—
Proleter Osijek	Osijek	SR Croatia	9th
Sloboda	Tuzla	SR Bosnia and Herzegovina	5th
RNK Split	Split	SR Croatia	—
Šibenik	Šibenik	SR Croatia	8th
Trešnjevka	Zagreb	SR Croatia	3rd
Varteks	Varaždin	SR Croatia	6th
Željezničar Sarajevo	Sarajevo	SR Bosnia and Herzegovina	2nd

=== League table ===
Pos	Team	Pld	W	D	L	GF	GA	GD	Pts	Promotion or qualification
1	Željezničar (C, P)	22	14	3	5	53	21	+32	31	Promotion to Yugoslav First League
2	Sloboda Tuzla (O, P)	22	13	5	4	48	20	+28	31	Qualification for promotion play-off
3	Trešnjevka	22	10	9	3	46	24	+22	29	
4	Čelik	22	13	2	7	40	26	+14	28	
5	Maribor	22	10	4	8	33	33	0	24	
6	Karlovac	22	7	7	8	35	41	−6	21	
7	Proleter Osijek	22	5	9	8	34	39	−5	19	
8	RNK Split	22	5	9	8	25	31	−6	19	
9	Šibenik	22	8	3	11	21	42	−21	19	
10	Borovo	22	4	7	11	29	46	−17	15	
11	Lokomotiva	22	4	6	12	30	48	−18	14	
12	Varteks (O)	22	3	8	11	21	44	−23	14	Qualification for relegation play-off

Source: fsgzrenjanin.com
Rules for classification: 1) points; 2) goal difference; 3) number of goals scored.
(C) Champions; (O) Play-off winners; (P) Promoted

== East Division ==
=== Teams ===
A total of twelve teams contested the league, including nine sides from the 1960–61 season, one club relegated from the 1960–61 Yugoslav First League and two sides promoted from the third tier leagues played in the 1960–61 season. The league was contested in a double round robin format, with each club playing every other club twice, for a total of 22 rounds. Two points were awarded for wins and one point for draws.

Radnički Belgrade were relegated from the 1960–61 Yugoslav First League after finishing in the 12th place of the league table. The two clubs promoted to the second level were Prishtina and Proleter Zrenjanin.

Locations of teams' home cities in the 1961–62 Yugoslav Second League East

Team	Location	Federal subject	Position in 1960–61
Budućnost	Titograd	SR Montenegro	2nd
Mačva Šabac	Šabac	SR Serbia	10th
Prishtina	Pristina	(Socialist Republic of Serbia) SAP Kosovo	—
Proleter Zrenjanin	Zrenjanin	(Socialist Republic of Serbia) SAP Vojvodina	—
Radnički Belgrade	Belgrade	SR Serbia	—
Radnički Kragujevac	Kragujevac	SR Serbia	8th
Radnički Niš	Niš	SR Serbia	5th
Radnički Sombor	Sombor	(Socialist Republic of Serbia) SAP Vojvodina	3rd
Rudar	Kosovska Mitrovica	(Socialist Republic of Serbia) SAP Kosovo	9th
Spartak Subotica	Subotica	(Socialist Republic of Serbia) SAP Vojvodina	6th
Srem	Sremska Mitrovica	(Socialist Republic of Serbia) SAP Vojvodina	4th
Sutjeska	Nikšić	SR Montenegro	7th

=== League table ===
Pos	Team	Pld	W	D	L	GF	GA	GD	Pts	Promotion or qualification
1	Budućnost (C, P)	22	12	4	6	36	29	+7	28	Promotion to Yugoslav First League
2	Radnički Niš (O, P)	22	11	5	6	48	39	+9	27	Qualification for promotion play-off and Qualification for Balkans Cup
3	Radnički Beograd	22	11	3	8	36	22	+14	25	
4	Srem	22	9	5	8	42	33	+9	23	
5	Rudar	22	9	5	8	41	37	+4	23	
6	Proleter Zrenjanin	22	9	4	9	37	43	−6	22	
7	Sutjeska Nikšić	22	10	1	11	36	33	+3	21	
8	Mačva Šabac	22	8	4	10	18	29	−11	20	
9	Spartak Subotica	22	7	5	10	33	30	+3	19	
10	Prishtina	22	7	5	10	29	31	−2	19	
11	Radnički Sombor (R)	22	7	5	10	23	46	−23	19	Qualification for relegation play-off
12	Radnički Kragujevac (O)	22	5	8	9	27	34	−7	18	Qualification for relegation play-off

Source: fsgzrenjanin.com
Rules for classification: 1) points; 2) goal difference; 3) number of goals scored.
(C) Champions; (O) Play-off winners; (P) Promoted; (R) Relegated

== See also ==
- 1961–62 Yugoslav First League
- 1961–62 Yugoslav Cup
