= 1988–89 Balkans Cup =

Tournament details
- Country: Balkans
- Teams: 6

Final positions
- Champions: (Greece) OFI
- Runners-up: (Socialist Federal Republic of Yugoslavia) Radnički Niš

Tournament statistics
- Matches played: 9
- Goals scored: 23 (2.56 per match)

The 1988–1989 Balkans Cup was an edition of the Balkans Cup, a football competition for representative clubs from the Balkan states. It was contested by 6 teams and OFI won the trophy.

== Group Stage ==
=== Group A ===
| Pos | Team | Pld | W | D | L | GF | GA | GR | Pts | Qualification |
|---|---|---|---|---|---|---|---|---|---|---|
| 1 | (Greece) OFI (A) | 2 | 1 | 1 | 0 | 4 | 1 | 4.000 | 3 | Advances to final |
| 2 | (Albania) Labinoti Elbasani | 2 | 0 | 1 | 1 | 1 | 4 | 0.250 | 1 | |
| 3 | (Turkey) Malatyaspor (Note: Malatyaspor withdrew from the tournament.) | 0 | 0 | 0 | 0 | 0 | 0 | — | 0 | |

Source: rsssf.com
Rules for classification: 1) points; 2) goal average; 3) number of goals scored
(A) Advance to a further round
Notes:
23 November 1988

| OFI (Greece) | 3–0 | (Albania) Labinoti Elbasani |

Theodoros Vardinogiannis Stadium, Heraklion

10 May 1989

| Labinoti Elbasani (Albania) | 1–1 | (Greece) OFI |

Elbasan Arena, Elbasan

=== Group B ===
| Pos | Team | Pld | W | D | L | GF | GA | GR | Pts | Qualification |
|---|---|---|---|---|---|---|---|---|---|---|
| 1 | (Socialist Federal Republic of Yugoslavia) Radnički Niš (A) | 4 | 2 | 1 | 1 | 6 | 5 | 1.200 | 5 | Advances to final |
| 2 | (Romania) Universitatea Craiova | 4 | 2 | 1 | 1 | 2 | 2 | 1.000 | 5 | |
| 3 | (Bulgaria) Lokomotiv Sofia | 4 | 1 | 0 | 3 | 6 | 7 | 0.857 | 2 | |

Source: rsssf.com
Rules for classification: 1) points; 2) goal average; 3) number of goals scored
(A) Advance to a further round
25 October 1988

| Lokomotiv Sofia (Bulgaria) | 2–0 | (Romania) Universitatea Craiova |

Lokomotiv, Sofia

9 November 1988

| Universitatea Craiova (Romania) | 1–0 | (Socialist Federal Republic of Yugoslavia) Radnički Niš |
|---|---|---|
| Mănăilă 45' |

Central, Craiova
Attendance: 8,000

24 November 1988

| Radnički Niš (Socialist Federal Republic of Yugoslavia) | 2–1 | (Bulgaria) Lokomotiv Sofia |

Čair, Niš

4 April 1989

| Universitatea Craiova (Romania) | 1–0 | (Bulgaria) Lokomotiv Sofia |
|---|---|---|
| Săndoi 73' |

Central, Craiova
Attendance: 10,000
Referee: Besnik Kaimi (Albania)

9 May 1989

| Radnički Niš (Socialist Federal Republic of Yugoslavia) | 0–0 | (Romania) Universitatea Craiova |

Čair, Niš

16 May 1989

| Lokomotiv Sofia (Bulgaria) | 3–4 | (Socialist Federal Republic of Yugoslavia) Radnički Niš |

Lokomotiv, Sofia

== Final ==
7 June 1989

| OFI (Greece) | 3–1 | (Socialist Federal Republic of Yugoslavia) Radnički Niš |
|---|---|---|
| Batzinilos 53'; Vlastos 70'; Papavassilou 90' | | Višnjić 40' |

Serres Municipal Stadium, Serres
Attendance: 5,000
Referee: Dimitar Dimitrov (Bulgaria)
