= Saša Mrkić =

Serbian football manager and player

Personal information
- Date of birth: 16 December 1967 (age 58)
- Place of birth: Niš, SR Serbia, SFR Yugoslavia
- Position: Defender

Senior career*
Years	Team	Apps	(Gls)
1988–1995	Radnički Niš	145	(2)
1995	Borac Čačak	2	(0)
1996	Shumen	14	(0)
1997–1998	Priština	32	(2)
1998–1999	Obilić	14	(0)
1999–2000	CSKA Sofia	4	(0)
2000–2001	Radnički Niš	18	(0)
Total		229	(4)

Managerial career
- 2007–2008: Sinđelić Niš
- 2009–2012: Sinđelić Niš
- 2012: Sloga Kraljevo
- 2013: Radnički Niš
- 2014: Radnički Niš
- 2016: Dinamo Vranje
- 2020–2021: Dubočica
- 2022: Radnički Niš
- * Club domestic league appearances and goals

Saša Mrkić (Serbian Cyrillic: Саша Мркић; born 16 December 1967) is a Serbian football manager and former player.

== Playing career ==
A defender, Mrkić spent eight seasons with Radnički Niš in two spells between 1988 and 2001. He also played abroad in Bulgaria.

== Managerial career ==
After hanging up his boots, Mrkić served as manager of Radnički Niš on several occasions.

== Personal life ==
Mrkić is the father of fellow footballer Marko Mrkić.

== Career statistics ==
Club	Season	League	
Club	Season	Apps	Goals
Radnički Niš	1988–89	1	0
Radnički Niš	1989–90	15	0
Radnički Niš	1990–91	21	0
Radnički Niš	1991–92	13	0
Radnički Niš	1992–93	32	1
Radnički Niš	1993–94	32	1
Radnički Niš	1994–95	31	0
Radnički Niš	Total	145	2
Borac Čačak	1995–96	2	0
Priština	1997–98	32	2
Obilić	1998–99	14	0
Career total		193	4
