= 2008–09 Serbian League East =

Serbian League East
- Season: 2008–09
- Champions: Radnički (N)
- Promoted: Radnički (N)
- Relegated: Topličanin
- Matches: 210
- Goals: 494 (2.35 per match)

The 2008–09 Serbian League East season was the sixth season of the league under its current title. It began on 16 August 2008 and ended on 31 May 2009.

== League table ==
Pos	Team	Pld	W	D	L	GF	GA	GD	Pts	Promotion or relegation
1	Radnički Niš (C, P)	28	21	6	1	59	16	+43	69	Promotion to Serbian First League
2	Timok	28	17	6	5	44	14	+30	57	
3	Hajduk Veljko	28	15	5	8	39	26	+13	50	
4	Dubočica	28	14	5	9	38	27	+11	47	
5	Sinđelić Niš	28	12	7	9	31	24	+7	43	
6	Balkanski	28	9	11	8	34	32	+2	38	
7	Car Konstantin	28	10	4	14	34	35	−1	34	
8	Kopaonik	28	8	9	11	30	33	−3	33	
9	Svrljig	28	8	9	11	27	34	−7	33	
10	Radnički Pirot	28	9	5	14	22	30	−8	32	
11	Jedinstvo Paraćin	28	9	5	14	29	46	−17	32	
12	Radnik Surdulica	28	8	7	13	31	35	−4	31	
13	Župa	28	7	9	12	22	40	−18	30	
14	Vlasina	28	7	7	14	33	51	−18	28	
15	Topličanin (R)	28	6	5	17	21	51	−30	23	Relegation to Niš Zone League

Source: srbijasport.net
Rules for classification: 1) points; 2) goal difference; 3) number of goals scored.
(C) Champions; (P) Promoted; (R) Relegated
