= Aleksandar Vidović =

Bosnia and Herzegovina footballer

Personal information
- Full name: Aleksandar Vidović
- Date of birth: 12 May 2001 (age 25)
- Place of birth: Milići, Bosnia and Herzegovina
- Height: 1.82 m (5 ft 11 1/2 in)
- Position: Left-back

Team information
- Current team: Smederevo
- Number: 23

Youth career
- –2019: Spartak Subotica

Senior career*
Years	Team	Apps	(Gls)
2020–2023	Spartak Subotica	43	(0)
2023–2024	Mladost Novi Sad	20	(0)
2024–	Smederevo	64	(2)
- * Club domestic league appearances and goals as of 14 May 2026

Aleksandar Vidović (Serbian Cyrillic: Александар Видовић; born 12 May 2001) is a Bosnian professional footballer who plays as a left-back for Smederevo in the Serbian First League.

== Club career ==
Born in Milići, Bosnia and Herzegovina, part of Republika Srpska entity, he started his career in Serbia with youth team of FK Spartak Subotica, where he debuted for the senior team at the 2019–20 Serbian SuperLiga.
