= Dušan Nenković =

Yugoslav and Serbian football manager and player (1929–2007)

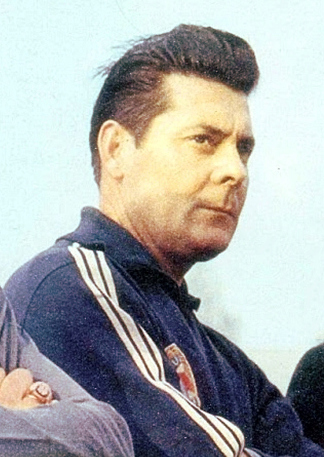
- Nenković as Hajduk Split manager

Personal information
- Date of birth: 3 November 1929
- Place of birth: Kragujevac, Yugoslavia
- Date of death: 24 August 2007 (aged 77)
- Place of death: Kragujevac, Serbia

Managerial career
- Years: Team
- 1961–1962: Radnički Beograd
- 1963–1965: Radnički Niš
- 1965–1969: Hajduk Split
- 1969–1971: Radnički Kragujevac
- 1971–1973: Budućnost Titograd
- 1973–1974: Santa Fe
- 1976–1977: Egypt
- 1979–1982: Radnički Niš
- 1982–1984: Brest
- 1984–1985: Radnički Niš
- 1985–1986: Zamalek
- 1986–1987: Radnički Kragujevac

Dušan Nenković (Serbian Cyrillic: Душан Ненковић; 3 November 1929 – 24 August 2007) was a Yugoslav and Serbian football manager and player.

== Playing career ==
Born in Kragujevac, Nenković played for Jedinstvo Zemun during the early 1950s before starting his managerial career at an early age.

== Managerial career ==
Nenković was manager of Hajduk Split from 1965 to 1969, winning the Yugoslav Cup in the 1966–67 season. He also notably served as manager of Radnički Niš on three occasions between 1963 and 1985, leading them to the semi-finals of the UEFA Cup in 1981–82. Following that success, Nenković went to France and spent two seasons in charge of Brest.

== Honours ==
Hajduk Split

- Yugoslav Cup: 1966–67

Budućnost Titograd

- Yugoslav Second League: 1971–72 (Group South), 1972–73 (Group South)

Zamalek SC

- Egyptian Friendship Cup: 1986
