= FK Železničar Niš =

Serbian football club

Železničar Niš
- Full name: Fudbalski Klub Železničar
- Nickname: Želja
- Founded: 1928; 98 years ago
- Dissolved: 2012; 14 years ago
- Ground: Stadion kraj Carske pruge, Niš
- Capacity: 5,000
- 2011–12: Niš Second League, 3rd of 13

FK Železničar Niš (Serbian Cyrillic: ФК Железничар Ниш) was a football club based in Niš, Serbia.

== History ==
Founded in 1928, the club initially competed in the Niš Football Subassociation League, winning the title in 1939 and 1941. They subsequently participated in the 1946–47 Yugoslav First League as 14. Oktobar, immediately suffering relegation. Later on, the club competed for five seasons in the Yugoslav Second League from 1962 to 1967.

== Notable players ==
National team players

- (Serbia and Montenegro) Saša Simonović
