= 1985–86 Yugoslav Second League =

Yugoslav Second League
- Season: 1985–86
- Champions: Spartak Subotica (West Division); Radnički Niš (East Division)
- Promoted: Spartak Subotica; Radnički Niš
- Relegated: AIK Bačka Topola; Jedinstvo Bihać; Zadar; Koper; Bor; Zemun; Lovćen; Bregalnica Štip

The 1985–86 Yugoslav Second League season was the 40th season of the Second Federal League (Serbo-Croatian: Druga savezna liga), the second level association football competition of SFR Yugoslavia, since its establishment in 1946. The league was contested in two regional groups (West Division and East Division), with 18 clubs each.

== West Division ==
=== Teams ===
A total of eighteen teams contested the league, including thirteen sides from the 1984–85 season, one club relegated from the 1984–85 Yugoslav First League and four sides promoted from the Inter-Republic Leagues played in the 1984–85 season. The league was contested in a double round robin format, with each club playing every other club twice, for a total of 34 rounds. Two points were awarded for wins and one point for draws.

Iskra Bugojno were relegated from the 1984–85 Yugoslav First League after finishing in the 17th place of the league table. The four clubs promoted to the second level were AIK Bačka Topola, Famos Hrasnica, Koper and Zadar.

Locations of teams' home cities in the 1985–86 Yugoslav Second League West

Team	Location	Federal subject	Position in 1984–85
AIK Bačka Topola	Bačka Topola	(Socialist Republic of Serbia) SAP Vojvodina	—
Borac Banja Luka	Banja Luka	SR Bosnia and Herzegovina	8th
GOŠK-Jug	Dubrovnik	SR Croatia	9th
Famos Hrasnica	Hrasnica	SR Bosnia and Herzegovina	—
Iskra	Bugojno	SR Bosnia and Herzegovina	—
Jedinstvo Bihać	Bihać	SR Bosnia and Herzegovina	7th
Jedinstvo Brčko	Brčko	SR Bosnia and Herzegovina	5th
Kikinda	Kikinda	(Socialist Republic of Serbia) SAP Vojvodina	13th
Koper	Koper	SR Slovenia	—
Leotar	Trebinje	SR Bosnia and Herzegovina	10th
Novi Sad	Novi Sad	(Socialist Republic of Serbia) SAP Vojvodina	11th
Proleter Zrenjanin	Zrenjanin	(Socialist Republic of Serbia) SAP Vojvodina	4th
Rudar Ljubija	Prijedor	SR Bosnia and Herzegovina	14th
Spartak Subotica	Subotica	(Socialist Republic of Serbia) SAP Vojvodina	3rd
RNK Split	Split	SR Croatia	6th
Šibenik	Šibenik	SR Croatia	2nd
Vrbas	Titov Vrbas	(Socialist Republic of Serbia) SAP Vojvodina	12th
Zadar	Zadar	SR Croatia	—

=== League table ===
Pos	Team	Pld	W	D	L	GF	GA	GD	Pts	Promotion or relegation
1	Spartak Subotica (C, P)	34	20	9	5	65	33	+32	49	Promotion to Yugoslav First League
2	Iskra	34	18	8	8	49	27	+22	44	
3	Leotar	34	18	8	8	55	39	+16	44	
4	Proleter Zrenjanin	34	15	9	10	40	29	+11	39	
5	Jedinstvo Brčko	34	16	4	14	51	50	+1	36	
6	Rudar Ljubija	34	12	10	12	38	41	−3	34	
7	Novi Sad	34	13	7	14	52	36	+16	33	
8	Kikinda	34	12	9	13	42	31	+11	33	
9	Šibenik	34	12	9	13	36	38	−2	33	
10	Vrbas	34	13	6	15	40	43	−3	32	
11	GOŠK-Jug	34	12	8	14	31	35	−4	32	
12	Borac Banja Luka	34	11	10	13	45	57	−12	32	
13	RNK Split	34	12	8	14	38	58	−20	32	
14	Famos Hrasnica	34	10	10	14	35	39	−4	30	
15	AIK Bačka Topola (R)	34	12	6	16	36	47	−11	30	Relegation to Inter-Republic Leagues
16	Jedinstvo Bihać (R)	34	11	7	16	38	46	−8	29	Relegation to Inter-Republic Leagues
17	Zadar (R)	34	12	4	18	35	47	−12	28	Relegation to Inter-Republic Leagues
18	Koper (R)	34	8	6	20	23	53	−30	22	Relegation to Inter-Republic Leagues

Source: fsgzrenjanin.com
Rules for classification: 1) points; 2) goal difference; 3) number of goals scored.
(C) Champions; (P) Promoted; (R) Relegated

== East Division ==
=== Teams ===
A total of eighteen teams contested the league, including thirteen sides from the 1984–85 season, one club relegated from the 1984–85 Yugoslav First League and four sides promoted from the Inter-Republic Leagues played in the 1984–85 season. The league was contested in a double round robin format, with each club playing every other club twice, for a total of 34 rounds. Two points were awarded for wins and one point for draws.

Radnički Niš were relegated from the 1984–85 Yugoslav First League after finishing in the 18th place of the league table. The four clubs promoted to the second level were Lovćen, Radnički Kragujevac, Crvena Zvezda Gnjilane and Teteks.

Locations of teams' home cities in the 1985–86 Yugoslav Second League East

Team	Location	Federal subject	Position in 1984–85
Belasica	Strumica	SR Macedonia	11th
Bor	Bor	SR Serbia	12th
Borac Čačak	Čačak	SR Serbia	8th
Bregalnica Štip	Štip	SR Macedonia	14th
Ivangrad	Ivangrad	SR Montenegro	10th
Lovćen	Cetinje	SR Montenegro	—
Napredak Kruševac	Kruševac	SR Serbia	7th
Novi Pazar	Novi Pazar	SR Serbia	2nd
Pelister	Bitola	SR Macedonia	3rd
Rad	Belgrade	SR Serbia	5th
Radnički Kragujevac	Kragujevac	SR Serbia	—
Radnički Niš	Niš	SR Serbia	—
Radnički Pirot	Pirot	SR Serbia	4th
Crvena Zvezda Gnjilane	Gnjilane	(Socialist Republic of Serbia) SAP Kosovo	—
Sloboda Titovo Užice	Titovo Užice	SR Serbia	13th
Teteks	Tetovo	SR Macedonia	—
Trepča	Kosovska Mitrovica	(Socialist Republic of Serbia) SAP Kosovo	9th
Zemun	Zemun	SR Serbia	6th

=== League table ===
Pos	Team	Pld	W	D	L	GF	GA	GD	Pts	Promotion or relegation
1	Radnički Niš (C, P)	34	22	8	4	65	21	+44	52	Promotion to Yugoslav First League
2	Rad	34	19	13	2	53	20	+33	51	
3	Radnički Kragujevac	34	13	10	11	37	34	+3	36	
4	Novi Pazar	34	13	10	11	34	32	+2	36	
5	Borac Čačak	34	14	6	14	46	39	+7	34	
6	Pelister	34	11	12	11	45	40	+5	34	
7	Teteks	34	13	8	13	37	33	+4	34	
8	Sloboda Titovo Užice	34	11	12	11	32	28	+4	34	
9	Trepča	34	13	8	13	42	39	+3	34	
10	Ivangrad	34	13	8	13	29	45	−16	34	
11	Napredak Kruševac	34	11	11	12	50	45	+5	33	
12	Radnički Pirot	34	11	11	12	48	43	+5	33	
13	Belasica	34	14	5	15	50	48	+2	33	
14	Crvena Zvezda Gnjilane	34	10	13	11	31	41	−10	33	
15	Bor (R)	34	10	10	14	30	38	−8	30	Relegation to Inter-Republic Leagues
16	Zemun (R)	34	10	8	16	42	54	−12	28	Relegation to Inter-Republic Leagues
17	Lovćen (R)	34	8	9	17	34	63	−29	25	Relegation to Inter-Republic Leagues
18	Bregalnica Shtip (R)	34	3	12	19	20	62	−42	18	Relegation to Inter-Republic Leagues

Source: fsgzrenjanin.com
Rules for classification: 1) points; 2) goal difference; 3) number of goals scored.
(C) Champions; (P) Promoted; (R) Relegated

== See also ==
- 1985–86 Yugoslav First League
- 1985–86 Yugoslav Cup
