= 1975 Balkans Cup =

Tournament details
- Country: Balkans
- Teams: 6

Final positions
- Champions: (Socialist Federal Republic of Yugoslavia) Radnički Niš
- Runners-up: (Turkey) Eskişehirspor

Tournament statistics
- Matches played: 14
- Goals scored: 35 (2.5 per match)

The 1975 Balkans Cup was an edition of the Balkans Cup, a football competition for representative clubs from the Balkan states. It was contested by 6 teams and Radnički Niš won the trophy.

== Group Stage ==
=== Group A ===
| Pos | Team | Pld | W | D | L | GF | GA | GR | Pts | Qualification |
|---|---|---|---|---|---|---|---|---|---|---|
| 1 | (Turkey) Eskişehirspor (A) | 4 | 2 | 1 | 1 | 7 | 6 | 1.167 | 5 | Advances to finals |
| 2 | (Bulgaria) Lokomotiv Sofia | 4 | 2 | 0 | 2 | 5 | 5 | 1.000 | 4 | |
| 3 | (Romania) Farul Constanța | 4 | 1 | 1 | 2 | 5 | 6 | 0.833 | 3 | |

Source: rsssf.com
Rules for classification: 1) points; 2) goal average; 3) number of goals scored
(A) Advance to a further round
5 March 1975

| Lokomotiv Sofia (Bulgaria) | 3–0 | (Turkey) Eskişehirspor |
|---|---|---|
| Dimitrov 19'; Angelkolev 48'; Hacev 79' |

Lokomotiv Stadium, Sofia

16 April 1975

| Eskişehirspor (Turkey) | 2–1 | (Romania) Farul Constanța |
|---|---|---|
| Kaner 17'; Erdin 39' | | Mărculescu 64' |

Eskişehir Atatürk Stadium, Eskişehir

21 May 1975

| Eskişehirspor (Turkey) | 3–0 | (Bulgaria) Lokomotiv Sofia |
|---|---|---|
| Doğu 10', 85'; Kaner 39' |

Eskişehir Atatürk Stadium, Eskişehir

14 June 1975

| Farul Constanța (Romania) | 2–2 | (Turkey) Eskişehirspor |
|---|---|---|
| Bălosu 34'; Iovănescu 46' | | Tözer 50'; Doğu 53' |

Stadionul Farul, Constanța

26 July 1975

| Farul Constanța (Romania) | 2–1 | (Bulgaria) Lokomotiv Sofia |

Stadionul Farul, Constanța

2 August 1975

| Lokomotiv Sofia (Bulgaria) | 1–0 | (Romania) Farul Constanța |

Lokomotiv Stadium, Sofia

=== Group B ===
| Pos | Team | Pld | W | D | L | GF | GA | GR | Pts | Qualification |
|---|---|---|---|---|---|---|---|---|---|---|
| 1 | (Socialist Federal Republic of Yugoslavia) Radnički Niš (A) | 4 | 2 | 2 | 0 | 5 | 0 | — | 6 | Advances to finals |
| 2 | (Albania) 17 Nëntori | 4 | 1 | 1 | 2 | 7 | 5 | 1.400 | 3 | |
| 3 | (Greece) Panionios | 4 | 1 | 1 | 2 | 2 | 9 | 0.222 | 3 | |

Source: rsssf.com
Rules for classification: 1) points; 2) goal average; 3) number of goals scored
(A) Advance to a further round
19 March 1975

| Radnički Niš (Socialist Federal Republic of Yugoslavia) | 2–0 | (Greece) Panionios |

Čair Stadium, Niš

2 April 1975

| Panionios (Greece) | 2–1 | (Albania) 17 Nëntori |

Nea Smyrni Stadium, Athens

9 April 1975

| 17 Nëntori (Albania) | 0–0 | (Socialist Federal Republic of Yugoslavia) Radnički Niš |

Dinamo Stadium, Tirana

23 April 1975

| Panionios (Greece) | 0–0 | (Socialist Federal Republic of Yugoslavia) Radnički Niš |

Nea Smyrni Stadium, Athens

29 May 1975

| Radnički Niš (Socialist Federal Republic of Yugoslavia) | 3–0 | (Albania) 17 Nëntori |

Čair Stadium, Niš

15 June 1975

| 17 Nëntori (Albania) | 6–0 | (Greece) Panionios |

Dinamo Stadium, Tirana

== Finals ==
| Team 1 | Agg. | Team 2 | 1st leg | 2nd leg |
|---|---|---|---|---|
| Radnički Niš (Socialist Federal Republic of Yugoslavia) | 3–1 | (Turkey) Eskişehirspor | 1–0 | 2–1 |

=== First leg ===
15 October 1975

| Radnički Niš (Socialist Federal Republic of Yugoslavia) | 1–0 | (Turkey) Eskişehirspor |
|---|---|---|
| Dovedan 67' |

Čair, Niš
Referee: Liuben Radunchev (Bulgaria)

=== Second leg ===
1 November 1975

| Eskişehirspor (Turkey) | 1–2 | (Socialist Federal Republic of Yugoslavia) Radnički Niš |
|---|---|---|
| Mehmet Kalaycı 25' | | Nikolić 6', 85' |

Eskişehir Atatürk, Eskişehir
Attendance: 6,000
Referee: Constantin Dinulescu (Romania)

Radnički Niš won 3–1 on aggregate.
