= OFK Sinđelić Niš =

Serbian football club

Sinđelić Niš
- Full name: Omladinski Fudbalski Klub Sinđelić Niš
- Nickname: Sinđa
- Founded: 1918; 108 years ago
- Ground: Stadion u Durlanu, Durlan, Niš
- Capacity: 300
- President: Zoran Anđelković
- Head coach: Dobrivoje Đurđević
- League: Serbian League East
- 2024–25: Serbian League East, 13th of 16
- Website: www.ofksindjelicnis.com
Home colours	Away colours

OFK Sinđelić Niš (Serbian Cyrillic: ОФК Синђелић Ниш) is a football club based in Niš, Serbia. They compete in the Serbian League East, the third tier of the national league system.

== History ==
Founded in 1918, the club initially competed in a local league organized by the Niš Football Subassociation, winning the title in the competition's inaugural 1932 season.

After the breakup of Yugoslavia, the club won the newly formed Serbian League Niš in the 1995–96 season and took promotion to the Second League of FR Yugoslavia. They placed second from the bottom in Group East in their debut appearance and were instantly relegated from the second tier. Between 1997 and 2004, the club played seven seasons in the third tier, including six in the Serbian League Niš and one in the Serbian League East. They subsequently won the Niš Zone League in 2004–05, thus returned to the third tier.

The club achieved one of its biggest results in history by reaching the quarter-finals of the 2007–08 Serbian Cup, but eventually lost 5–1 to Partizan. After finishing as runners-up in the 2007–08 Serbian League East, they finished as champions in the 2009–10 season and earned promotion to the Serbian First League. The club placed fifth in its debut appearance in the second tier of Serbian football. They also repeated their best result in the national cup by reaching the quarter-finals of the 2010–11 Serbian Cup, when they were again eliminated by Partizan after losing 4–0. The club was relegated from the First League in the 2011–12 season.

Between 2012 and 2021, the club played in the Serbian League East for eight seasons. They marked their 100th anniversary in October 2018.

=== Recent league history ===
Season	Division	P	W	D	L	F	A	Pts	Pos
2020–21	3 - Serbian League East	38	18	8	12	66	37	62	10th
2021–22	4 - Zone League Centre	30	24	2	4	113	18	73 (Note: The club was docked one point.)	2nd
2022–23	4 - Zone League Centre	30	28	2	0	165	15	86	1st
2023–24	3 - Serbian League East	30	16	4	10	52	45	52	2nd
2024–25	3 - Serbian League East	30	9	8	13	29	38	35	13th

== Honours ==
- Serbian League Niš/Serbian League East (Tier 3)
  - Champions (2): 1995–96, 2009–10
- Niš Zone League/Zone League Centre (Tier 4)
  - Champions (2): 2004–05, 2022–23

== Notable players ==
This is a list of players who have played at full international level.

- (Serbia and Montenegro) Aleksandar Pantić

For a list of all OFK Sinđelić Niš players with a Wikipedia article, see Category:OFK Sinđelić Niš players.

== Historical list of coaches ==
- (Serbia) Saša Mrkić (2007-2008)
- (Bosnia and Herzegovina) Slobodan Halilović (2009)
- (Serbia) Saša Mrkić (2009-2012)
- (Serbia) Aleksandar Kuzmanović (2012–2013)
- (Serbia) Milan Dimoski (2013)
- (Bosnia and Herzegovina) Slobodan Halilović (2013)
- (Serbia) Nenad Milanović
- (Serbia) Zoran Dimitrijević (2014–2017)
- (Serbia) Predrag Stamenković (2017–2018)
- (Serbia) Zoran Dimitrijević (2018–2019)
- (Serbia) Saša Jovanović (2019)
- (Serbia) Andrej Raičević (2020)
- (Serbia) Zoran Dimitrijević (2020)
- (Serbia) Saša Jovanović (2020–2021)
- (Serbia) Zoran Dimitrijević (2021-2022)
- (Serbia) Stevan Stefanović (2022–2023)
- (Serbia) Zoran Dimitrijević (2023-2024)
- (Serbia) Dejan Krstić (2025)
- (Serbia) Dobrivoje Đurđević
