= 2015 Apatin Open darts =

Apatin Open

Tournament information
- Dates: 5 July 2015
- Country: Serbia
- Organisation(s): WDF
- Winner's share: €600

Champion(s)
- (Croatia) Boris Krcmar (Hungary) Veronika Ihasz

2015 Apatin Open is a darts tournament, which took place in Apatin, Serbia in 2015.

== Results ==
=== Men ===
Round	Player
Winner	(Croatia) Boris Krcmar
Final	(Netherlands) Ron Meulenkamp
Semi-finals	(Hungary) Nandor Bezzeg
Semi-finals	(Croatia) Mario Ivelic
Quarter-finals	(Croatia) Zoran Keser
Quarter-finals	(Hungary) Joszef Rucska
Quarter-finals	(Slovenia) Vastimir Gavrilovic
Quarter-finals	(Serbia) Aleksandar Boric
Last 16	(Croatia) Igor Sestan
Last 16	(Bulgaria) Miroslav Petrov
Last 16	(Hungary) Zoltan Balog
Last 16	(Serbia) Tihomir Patrik
Last 16	(Croatia) Slavko Brzic
Last 16	(Hungary) Adam Abonyi
Last 16	(Serbia) Dragan Ivanovic
Last 16	(Serbia) Petar Vojnic Zelic

=== Women ===
Round	Player
Winner	(Hungary) Veronika Ihasz
Final	(Hungary) Csilla Kovacs
Semi-finals	(Bulgaria) Anelia Eneva
Semi-finals	(Bulgaria) Kunka Ivanova
Quarter-finals	(Serbia) Dragana Tomešić
Quarter-finals	(Serbia) Đurđina Miščević
Quarter-finals	(Hungary) Boglarka Bokor
Quarter-finals	(Serbia) Tamara Milić
