= Darko Lovrić =

Serbian football manager and player

Darko Lovrić Дарко Ловрић
Personal information
- Full name: Darko Lovrić
- Date of birth: 24 November 1980 (age 45)
- Place of birth: Šid, SFR Yugoslavia
- Height: 1.84 m (6 ft 0 in)
- Position: Defender

Team information
- Current team: Sloga Erdevik (manager)

Youth career
- 1987–1997: Radnički Šid

Senior career*
Years	Team	Apps	(Gls)
1997–1999	Radnički Šid		
1999	Vojvodina		
2000–2002	Zvezdara	26	(1)
2002–2003	Srem	20	(4)
2003–2004	Železnik	0	(0)
2004	→ Radnički Beograd (loan)	15	(0)
2004–2005	Radnički Beograd	26	(0)
2005–2007	Voždovac	41	(1)
2008	Bežanija	11	(0)
2008–2010	Vojvodina	33	(0)
2010	→ Banants (loan)	7	(0)
2010–2012	Hapoel Ashkelon	59	(0)
2012–2014	Sloboda Užice	53	(0)
2014–2015	Radnički Šid		
2016–2017	Radnički Sremska Mitrovica	37	(1)
2018–2019	Sloga Erdevik		
Total		328	(7)

Managerial career
- 2022–: Sloga Erdevik
- * Club domestic league appearances and goals

Darko Lovrić (Serbian Cyrillic: Дарко Ловрић; born 24 November 1980) is a Serbian football manager and former player.

== Playing career ==
Lovrić started out at his hometown club Radnički Šid at the age of 7. He later joined Vojvodina, but quickly moved to Zvezdara, helping them win promotion to the 2001–02 First League of FR Yugoslavia. Later on, Lovrić played for Radnički Beograd in the 2004–05 First League of Serbia and Montenegro.

In the summer of 2008, Lovrić moved from Bežanija to Vojvodina. He was loaned to Armenian club Banants in early 2010. Between 2010 and 2012, Lovrić spent two seasons with Hapoel Ashkelon in Israel. He subsequently returned to Serbia and played two seasons with Sloboda Užice until 2014.

== Managerial career ==
In April 2022, Lovrić replaced Darko Baljak as manager of Sloga Erdevik.
