= Baljak =

Baljak (Serbian Cyrillic: Баљак) is a South Slavic surname. Notable people with the surname include:

- Darko Baljak (born 1983), Serbian football player and manager
- Raine Baljak (born 1996), Filipino-Australian model
- Srđan Baljak (born 1978), Serbian football player
