= Kupusina =

Kupusina Купусина (Serbian) Bácskertes (Hungarian)
- Village (Selo)
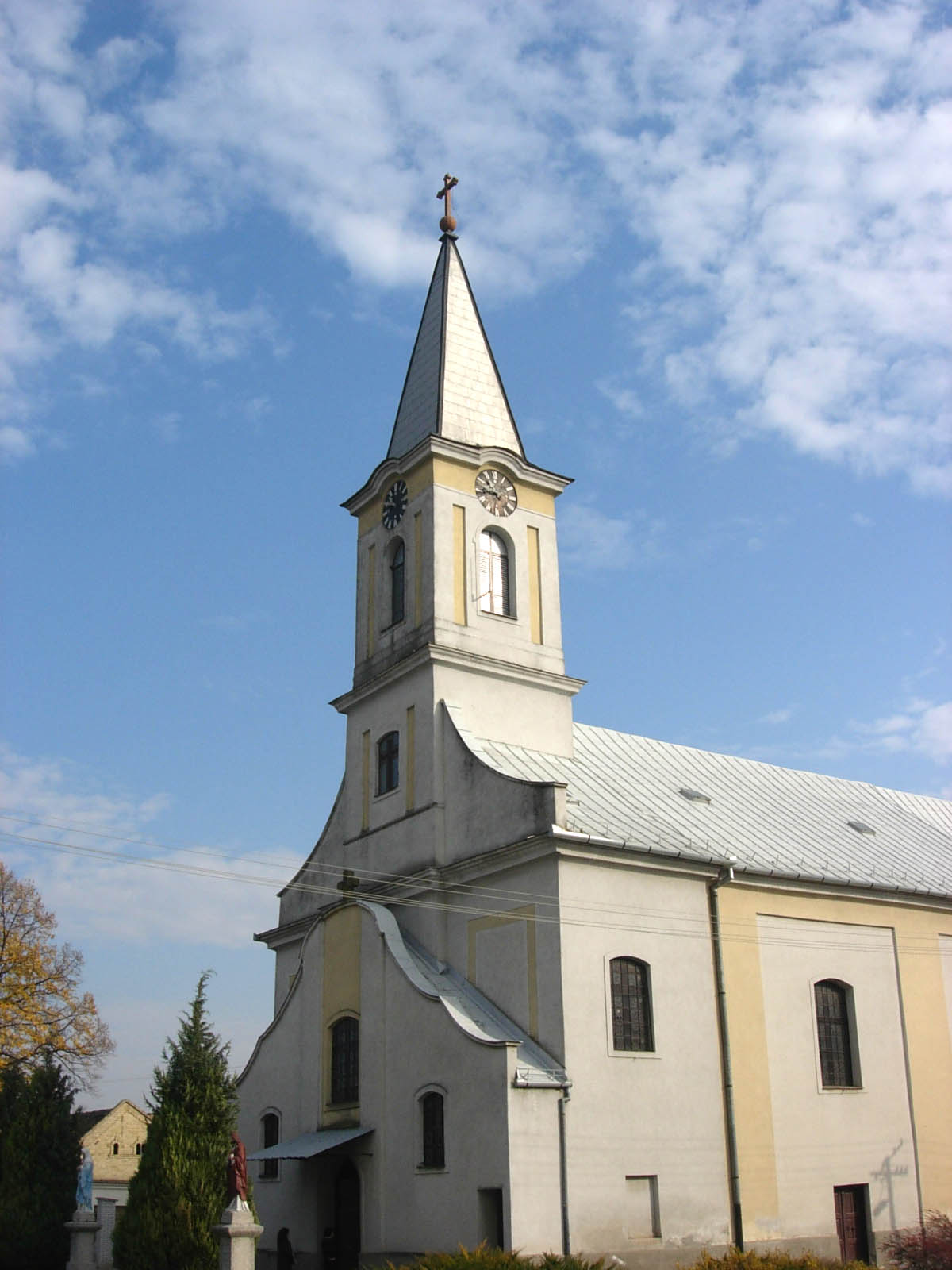
- The Saint Ana Catholic Church.

- Location within Vojvodina Location within Serbia Location within Europe
- Coordinates: 45°44′09.96″N 19°05′49.92″E
- Country: Serbia
- Province: Vojvodina
- Region: Bačka (Podunavlje)
- District: West Bačka
- Municipality: Apatin

Area
  - Total: 62.49 km^{2} (24.13 sq mi)
- Elevation: 125 m (410 ft)

Population (2011)
  - Total: 1,921
  - Density: 30.74/km^{2} (79.62/sq mi)
- Time zone: UTC+1 (CET)
  - Summer (DST): UTC+2 (CEST)

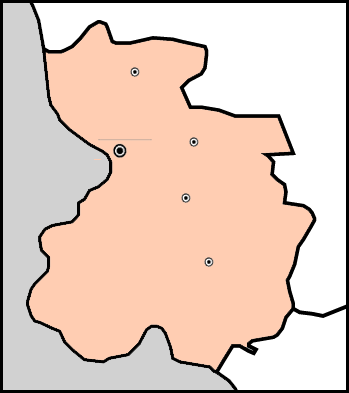

Kupusina (Serbian: Купусина, romanized: Kupusina; Hungarian: Bácskertes) is a village located in the municipality of Apatin West Bačka District, Vojvodina, Serbia. As of 2011 census, it has a population of 1,921 inhabitant and Hungarian ethnic majority.

== History ==
In June 2006 session of the Municipality of Apatin, the Hungarian language gained the status of the official language of Kupusina. Until then, Serbian language was the sole official language in this village, although Hungarians have comprised majority in the village since the country of Serbia and Montenegro was established.

== Demographics ==
=== Historical population ===
- 1961: 3,133
- 1971: 3,063
- 1981: 2,694
- 1991: 2,500
- 2002: 2,356
- 2011: 1,921

=== Ethnic groups ===
The ethnic groups in the village as of 2002 census:

- Hungarians = 1,857 (78.82%)
- Serbs = 279 (11.84%)
- others.

== See also ==
- List of places in Serbia
- List of cities, towns and villages in Vojvodina
