= Ervin Šinko =

Croatian writer, publisher & poet (1898–1967)

- Born: Franjo Spitzer; 5 October 1898; Apatin, Kingdom of Croatia-Slavonia, Austria-Hungary (now Apatin, Vojvodina, Serbia)
- Died: 26 March 1967 (aged 68); Zagreb, SFR Yugoslavia (now Zagreb, Croatia)
- Occupations: Writer, poet

Ervin Šinko, also known as Ervin Sinkó, (Hungarian pronunciation: [ɛrvin ʃiŋkoː], born Franjo Spitzer; 5 October 1898 – 26 March 1967) was a Hungarian-Yugoslav writer, publisher and poet.

== Biography ==
Šinko was born in Apatin to a Jewish family on 5 October 1898. He attended elementary school in Apatin and gymnasium in Subotica. During World War I, in 1917, Šinko was mobilized and in 1918 he participated in the establishment of the Hungarian Soviet Republic. At the center of his literary occupation were the topics and questions about the Hungarian Revolution. Šinko worked writing for many Hungarian magazines such as: A Tett, Ma, Internationale, Tüz, Korunk, Nyugat, and others. He moved to Vienna where, in 1924, he published the magazine Testvér. Šinko also lived in Zurich, Moscow, and Paris. While in Paris, his articles were published in L'Europe, Le Monde and Ce Soir. In 1939, he moved to Zagreb, where he lived until World War II. During the war, he escaped to Dalmatia, where he was arrested and imprisoned by the Italian Fascists. After the capitulation of Italy and liberation, Šinko joined the Partisans. In 1945, he moved back to Zagreb, where stayed for the rest of his life. Šinko was member of the Yugoslav Academy of Sciences and Arts from 1950 and as a regular member since 1960. He also was a member of the Croatian Writers Society. In 1946, he began to devote his energies to literary studies and writings on public affairs. In 1959, he became professor and director of the Hungarian department at Novi Sad University.

Šinko died on 26 March 1967 in Zagreb and was buried in Mirogoj Cemetery.

== Works ==
=== Poetry ===
- Nights and Dawns (Hungarian: Éjszakák és hajnalok, 1916)
- A Painful God (Hungarian: Fájdalmas isten, 1923)

=== Novels ===
- Fourteen Days (Serbo-Croatian: Četrnaest dana, 1947)
- Optimists: A Novel From One Revolution (Serbo-Croatian: Optimisti: roman jedne revolucije, 1954)

=== Novellas ===
- Giles Sets Off on the Road (Hungarian: Aegidius útra kelése, 1926)
- Aaron's Love (Croatian: Aronova ljubav, 1951)

=== Stories ===
- Little Tales (Serbo-Croatian: Pripovijetke, 1950)

=== Essays ===
- Eto ide naša sila...: uz omladinsku prugu, Nakladni zavod Hrvatske, Zagreb, 1947
- Književne studije, Nakladni zavod Hrvatske, Zagreb, 1949
- Sablast kruži Evropom: članci, rasprave i predavanja (1948.-1951.), Zora, Zagreb, 1951
- Roman jednog romana: bilješke iz moskovskog dnevnika od 1935 do 1937 godine., Zora, Zagreb, 1955
- Falanga Antikrista i drugi komentari, Zora, Zagreb, 1957
- Lik književnika danas, Univerzum, Zagreb, 1957
- Roman eines Romans: Moskauer Tagebuch, Verlag Wissenschaft und Politik, Köln, 1962
- Csokonai életmüve, Forum, Novi Sad, 1965
- Pjesme u prozi, Pripovijetke, Zapisi, Ogledi, Matica hrvatska, Zora, Zagreb, 1969
- Sablast kruži Evropom, Globus, Zagreb, 1982
- Drvarski dnevnik, BIGZ, Beograd, 1987
- Krleža: esszék, tanulmányok, kommentárok, Forum Könyvkiadó, Novi Sad, 1987
- Az út. Naplók: 1916–1939, Akadémiai Kiadó, Budimpešta, 1990
- Roman eines Romans: Moskauer Tagebuch, 1935–1937, Das Arsenal, Berlin, 1990

== Bibliography ==
- Kraus, Ognjen (1998). Dva stoljeća povijesti i kulture Židova u Zagrebu i Hrvatskoj. Zagreb: Židovska općina Zagreb. ISBN 953-96836-2-9.
- Romano, Jaša (1980). Jevreji Jugoslavije 1941–1945: žrtve genocida i učesnici narodnooslobodilačkog rata. Beograd: Jevrejski Istorijski Muzej, Saveza jevrejskih opština Jugoslavije.
- Ladan, Tomislav (2005). Hrvatski obiteljski leksikon. Zagreb: Leksikografski zavod »Miroslav Krleža«. ISBN 953-6748-26-6.
- Goldstein, Ivo (2001). Holokaust u Zagrebu. Zagreb: Novi Liber. ISBN 953-6045-19-2.
