= FK ČSK Čelarevo =

Serbian football club

ČSK Čelarevo
- Full name: Fudbalski Klub ČSK Pivara Čelarevo
- Nickname: Lavovi (The Lions)
- Founded: 1925; 101 years ago
- Ground: Stadion ČSK
- Capacity: 3,000
- President: Jovan Grubiša
- Head coach: Miroslav Pavlović
- League: PFL Sombor
- 2024–25: PFL Sombor, 15th of 16
Home colours	Away colours

FK ČSK Čelarevo (Serbian Cyrillic: ФК ЧСК Челарево) is a football club based in Čelarevo, Vojvodina, Serbia. They compete in the PFL Sombor, the fifth tier of the national league system.

== History ==
The original club in Čelarevo (at the time known as Čeb) was founded in 1925. They were named Čebski omladinski sportski klub (ČOSK). In 1946, the club was restored as FD Radnički. They changed their name to SD Podunavlje in 1950. In 1953, the club merged with SD Krajišnik (founded in 1950) to form ČSK. They reached the third tier of Yugoslav football in 1969, spending three seasons in the Vojvodina League.

After convincingly winning the Serbian League Vojvodina in 1997–98, the club spent four seasons in the Second League of FR Yugoslavia. They subsequently went on to finish as runners-up in the Serbian League Vojvodina on three consecutive occasions. The club eventually earned promotion to the newly formed Serbian First League via the play-offs in 2005. They placed fourth in their comeback season in the second tier, just four points away from promotion to the top flight. The club remained in the league until 2010.

The club was crowned as Serbian League Vojvodina champions for a second time in 2014–15, returning to the Serbian First League. They placed third in their return appearance, eight points below promotion to the Serbian SuperLiga. In 2017–18, the club finished second from the bottom and suffered relegation back to the Serbian League Vojvodina.

=== Recent league history ===
Season	Division	P	W	D	L	F	A	Pts	Pos
2020–21	4 - Vojvodina League North	34	13	8	13	48	46	47	9th
2021–22	4 - Vojvodina League North	30	11	4	15	28	42	37	14th
2022–23	5 - PFL Sombor	30	13	5	12	49	35	44	6th
2023–24	5 - PFL Sombor	30	10	4	16	37	52	34	12th
2024–25	5 - PFL Sombor	30	7	7	16	32	74	28	15th

== Honours ==
- Serbian League Vojvodina (Tier 3)
  - Champions (2): 1997–98, 2014–15

== Notable players ==
This is a list of players who have played at full international level.

- (Indonesia) Ilija Spasojević
- (Cameroon) Ibrahim Walidjo
- (China) Wan Houliang
- (Serbia) Aleksandar Davidov
- (Serbia) Marko Klisura
- (Serbia) Milan Pavkov
- (Serbia) Srđan Plavšić
- (Serbia) Veseljko Trivunović
- (Serbia and Montenegro) Petar Divić
- (United Arab Emirates) Saša Ivković

For a list of all FK ČSK Čelarevo players with a Wikipedia article, see Category:FK ČSK Čelarevo players.

== Historical list of coaches ==
- (Serbia and Montenegro) Zvonko Ivezić
- (Serbia and Montenegro) Vladimir Jocić
- (Serbia and Montenegro) Željko Račić (2002–2004)
- (Serbia and Montenegro) Nenad Cerović (2004)
- (Serbia and Montenegro) Miroslav Vukašinović (2005–2006)
- (Serbia) Dragan Ivanović (2006–2007)
- (Serbia) Vladimir Jocić (2007)
- (Serbia) Petar Kurćubić (2008)
- (Serbia) Trivo Ilić (2009)
- (Serbia) Petar Kurćubić (2009)
- (Serbia) Dragan Škorić
- (Serbia) Dragan Ivanović
- (Serbia) Aleksandar Kocić (2011–2012)
- (Serbia) Siniša Čubrilo
- (Serbia) Vlado Karakaš (2013-2015)
- (Serbia) Dragan Ivanović (2015-2016)
- (Serbia) Trivo Ilić (2016–2017)
- (Serbia) Siniša Čubrilo (caretaker) (2017)
- (Serbia) Vlado Karakaš (2017)
- (Serbia) Vladimir Buač (2018)
- (Serbia) Milan Mitrović (2018-2019)
- (Serbia) Željko Račić (2020-2021)
- (Serbia) Darko Sekulović
- (Serbia) Vlado Karakaš (2022-2023)
- (Serbia) Miroslav Pavlović (2023-2025)
