= Dejan Nikolić (footballer) =

Serbian football manager and player

Personal information
- Full name: Dejan Nikolić
- Date of birth: 27 April 1969 (age 57)
- Place of birth: Lučani, SR Serbia, SFR Yugoslavia
- Height: 1.88 m (6 ft 2 in)
- Position: Midfielder

Team information
- Current team: Loznica (manager)

Senior career*
Years	Team	Apps	(Gls)
1988–1991	Sloboda Užice	55	(2)
1993–1995	Napredak Kruševac	29	(0)
1995–1996	Mladost Lučani	37	(4)
1996–1997	Mouscron	29	(1)
1998	Mladost Lučani	12	(1)
1998–1999	Hajduk Kula	7	(0)
1999–2000	Hajduk Beograd	33	(2)
2003–2004	Mladost Lučani		
Total		202	(10)

Managerial career
- Sloga Bajina Bašta
- 2011: Polet Ljubić
- 2011–2012: Mladost Lučani
- 2013–2014: Mačva Šabac
- 2015: Budućnost Krušik 2014
- 2015–2016: Kolubara
- 2016–2018: Budućnost Krušik 2014
- 2018: Jagodina Tabane
- 2018–2019: Radnički 1923
- 2020: Kolubara
- 2021: Žarkovo
- 2022–2023: Radnički Sremska Mitrovica
- 2023–2024: Radnički Sremska Mitrovica
- 2024: Zemun
- 2025–: Loznica
- * Club domestic league appearances and goals

Dejan Nikolić (Serbian Cyrillic: Дејан Николић; born 27 April 1969) is a Serbian football manager and former player.

== Playing career ==
Nikolić started out with Sloboda Užice and played in the Yugoslav Second League for three seasons (1988–89, 1989–90, and 1990–91). He also spent some time at Napredak Kruševac (1993–94 and 1994–95) and Mladost Lučani (1995–96), before moving abroad to Belgian club Mouscron in 1996. After returning to his homeland, Nikolić played for Hajduk Kula (1998–99) and Hajduk Beograd (1999–2000) in the First League of FR Yugoslavia.

== Managerial career ==
After hanging up his boots, Nikolić served as manager of numerous Serbian First League and Serbian League West clubs, including Mladost Lučani and Mačva Šabac. He was also manager of Budućnost Krušik 2014 and Kolubara on two occasions.

== Honours ==
Mačva Šabac

- Serbian League West: 2013–14
