= Vladimir Jocić =

Serbian football manager and player

Personal information
- Full name: Vladimir Jocić
- Date of birth: 29 November 1953 (age 72)
- Place of birth: Žitni Potok, FPR Yugoslavia
- Height: 1.79 m (5 ft 10 in)
- Position: Striker

Youth career
- Topličanin

Senior career*
| Years | Team | Apps | (Gls) |
| 1976 | Red Star Belgrade | 0 | (0) |
| 1977–1979 | Radnički Niš | 52 | (18) |
| 1979–1980 | Partizan | 17 | (0) |
| 1981–1983 | Napredak Kruševac | 63 | (28) |
| 1983–1984 | Sutjeska Nikšić | 21 | (13) |
| 1984–1985 | Napredak Kruševac | 24 | (10) |
| 1985–1986 | Radnički Niš | 11 | (8) |
| 1986 | Kocaelispor | 8 | (1) |
- Kolubara

Managerial career
- 1998: Napredak Kruševac
- ČSK Čelarevo
- 2006: Radnički Pirot
- 2006: Radnički Niš
- 2007: ČSK Čelarevo
- 2008: Radnički Niš
- 2009: Šumadija Radnički 1923
- 2013–2014: Donji Srem (first-team coach)
- 2015–2016: Radnički Šid
- 2017: Radnički Sremska Mitrovica
- 2018: Hajduk Divoš
- 2022–2023: Bor
- * Club domestic league appearances and goals

Vladimir Jocić (Serbian Cyrillic: Владимир Јоцић; born 29 November 1953) is a Serbian football manager and former player.

== Playing career ==
After spending two and a half seasons with Radnički Niš in the Yugoslav First League, Jocić joined Partizan in 1979. He failed to make much impact and was transferred to Napredak Kruševac during the 1980–81 season. After playing for three clubs in the Yugoslav Second League for five seasons, Jocić moved abroad and signed with Turkish club Kocaelispor in 1986.

== Managerial career ==
After hanging up his boots, Jocić served as manager of numerous clubs, including Napredak Kruševac, Radnički Pirot (April–June 2006), Radnički Niš (two spells), Šumadija Radnički 1923, Radnički Šid, Radnički Sremska Mitrovica, and Hajduk Divoš (February–April 2018).

== Career statistics ==
| Club | Season | League | |
| Club | Season | Apps | Goals |
|---|---|---|---|
| Napredak Kruševac | 1980–81 | 13 | 0 |
| Napredak Kruševac | 1981–82 | 19 | 8 |
| Napredak Kruševac | 1982–83 | 31 | 20 |
| Napredak Kruševac | 1984–85 | 24 | 10 |
| Napredak Kruševac | Total | 87 | 38 |
