= Church of the Assumption of Mary, Apatin =

Church of the Assumption of Mary
- Crkva uznesenja blažene djevice Marije
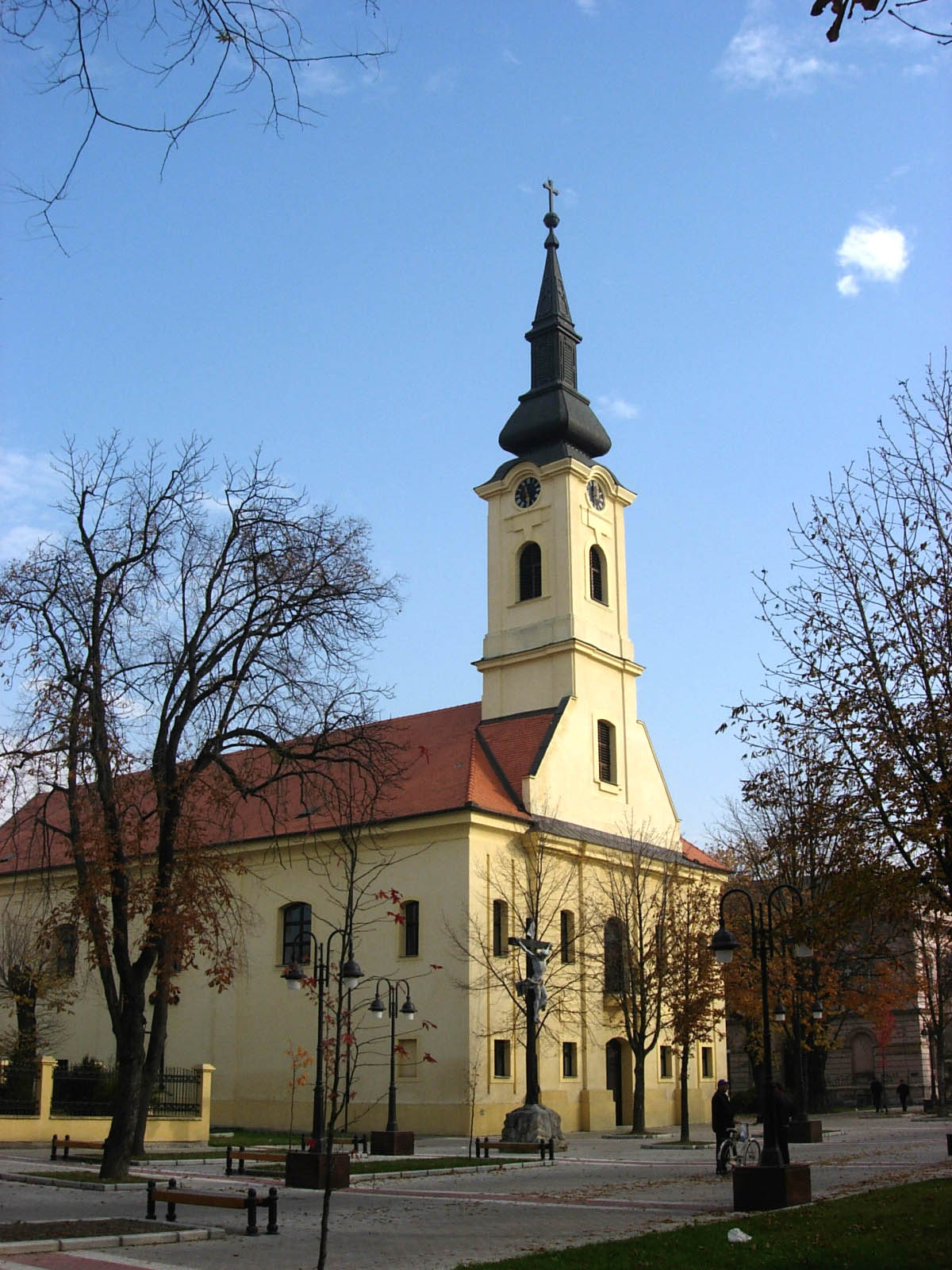
- Church of the Assumption of Mary
- Church of the Assumption of Mary
- 45°40′16″N 18°58′58″E
- Location: Apatin, Vojvodina
- Country: Serbia
- Denomination: Roman Catholic

History
- Dedication: Assumption of Mary

Architecture
- Style: Neoclassicism
- Years built: 1785-1798

Administration
- Archdiocese: Roman Catholic Diocese of Subotica

Church of the Assumption of Mary (Serbo-Croatian: Crkva uznesenja blažene djevice Marije) is a Roman Catholic parish church in Apatin in Vojvodina, Serbia. The church was built in period between 1785 and 1789. The church was built on the main street which was afterwards renamed into Church's Street.
