= Svilojevo =

Svilojevo Свилојево (Serbian) Szilágyi (Hungarian)
- Village (Selo)
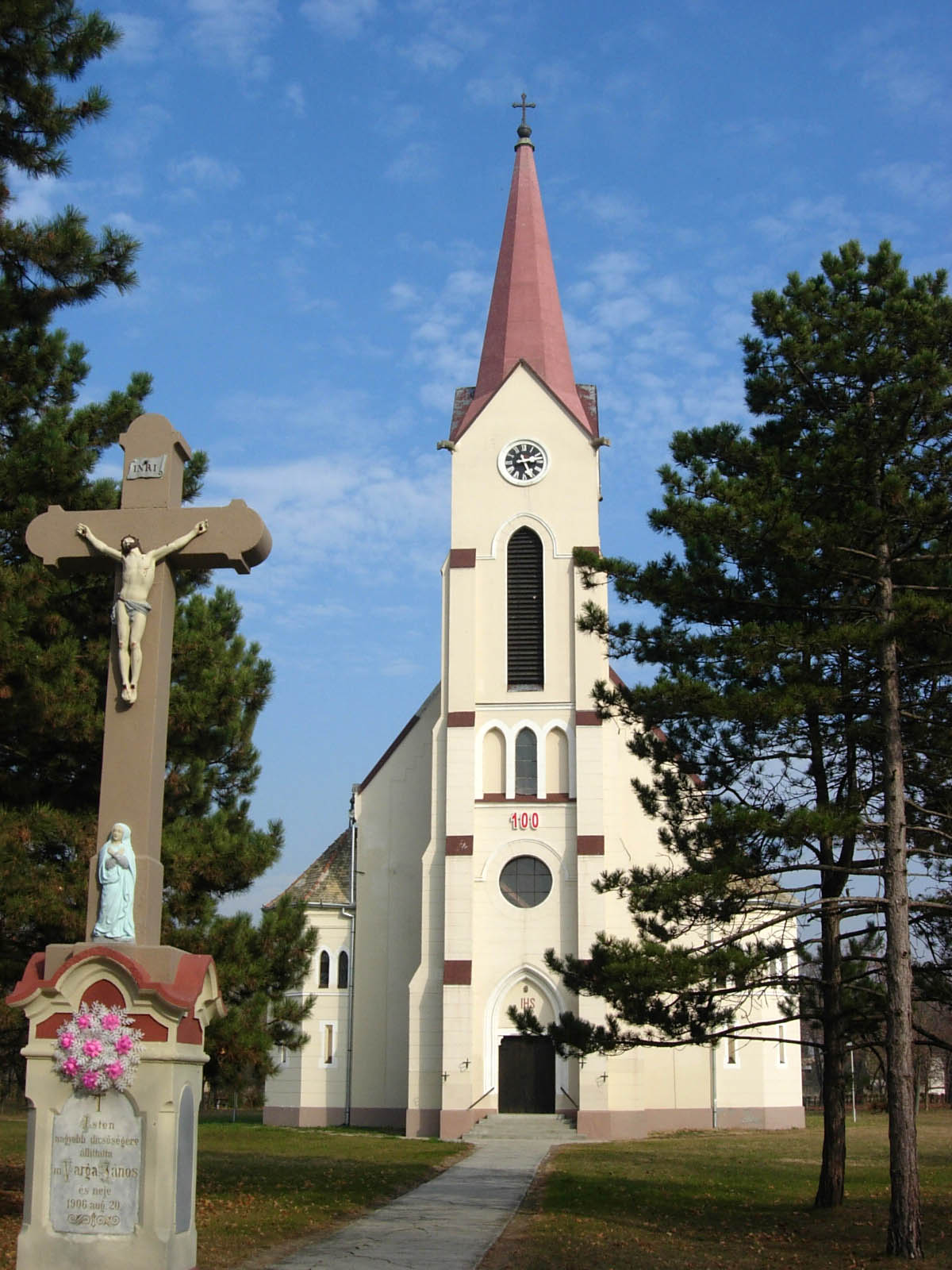
- Saint Stephen the King Catholic Church.

- Location within Vojvodina Location within Serbia Location within Europe
- Coordinates: 45°39′N 19°04′E
- Country: Serbia
- Province: Vojvodina
- Region: Bačka (Podunavlje)
- District: West Bačka
- Municipality: Apatin

Area
  - Total: 37.55 km^{2} (14.50 sq mi)
- Elevation: 82 m (269 ft)

Population (2011)
  - Total: 1,179
- Time zone: UTC+1 (CET)
  - Summer (DST): UTC+2 (CEST)

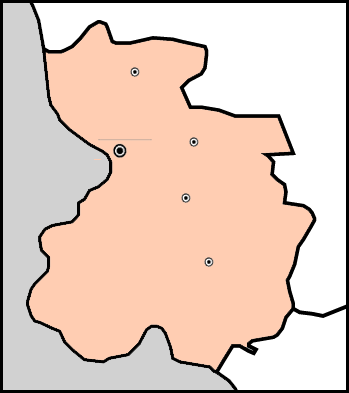

Svilojevo (Serbian Cyrillic: Свилојево; Hungarian: Szilágyi) is a village located in the municipality of Apatin, West Bačka District, Vojvodina, Serbia. As of 2011 census, the village has a population of 1,179 inhabitants, most of whom are ethnic Hungarians.

== History ==
In 2001, Svilojevo celebrated one hundred years since its establishment, and in 2006, the more recently renovated church became a hundred years old.

On the session of the Municipality of Apatin in June 2006, the Hungarian gained official in Svilojevo. Previously, Serbian had been the sole official language in this village, although Hungarians had composed a majority in the village.

== Demographics ==
=== Historical population ===
- 1961: 1,785
- 1971: 1,667
- 1981: 1,490
- 1991: 1,278
- 2002: 1,364
- 2011: 1,179

=== Ethnic groups ===
The ethnic groups as of 2002 census:

- Hungarians = 792 (58.07%)
- Serbs = 403 (29.55%)
- Croats = 47 (3.45%)
- Yugoslavs = 19 (1.39%)
- others.

== See also ==
- List of places in Serbia
- List of cities, towns and villages in Vojvodina
