= FK Radnički Sremska Mitrovica =

Serbian football club

Radnički Sremska Mitrovica
- Full name: Fudbalski Klub Radnički Sremska Mitrovica
- Founded: 15 April 1922; 103 years ago
- Dissolved: 2025
- Ground: Fudbalska Akademija, Mačvanska Mitrovica
- Capacity: 1,000
- President: Vojislav Vranjković
- 2024-25: Serbian First League, 10th (relegated)
- Website: Official
Home colours	Away colours

FK Radnički Sremska Mitrovica (Serbian Cyrillic: ФК Раднички Сремска Митровица) was a professional football club based in Sremska Mitrovica, Serbia.

== History ==
The club was founded on 15 April 1922. They won the Vojvodina League in the 1966–67 season and took promotion to the Serbian League North. The club competed for two seasons in the third tier of Yugoslav football, before suffering relegation in the 1968–69 season.

After spending four seasons in the Vojvodina League West, the club finished as champions in the 2011–12 season and earned promotion to the Serbian League Vojvodina. They spent eight consecutive seasons in the third tier, placing third on two occasions. In 2020, the club was administratively promoted to the Serbian First League.

After spending 5 seasons in Serbia's second tier, the club ran into financial difficulties and withdrew from the league in summer 2025.

== Honours ==
- Vojvodina League / Vojvodina League West (Tier 4)
  - Champions (2): 1966–67, 2011–12

== Seasons ==
Season	League									Cup
Season	Division	Pld	W	D	L	GF	GA	Pts	Pos	Cup
Serbia
2008–09	4 – Vojvodina West	34	13	3	18	43	75	42	12th	—
2009–10	4 – Vojvodina West	34	17	2	15	66	60	53	9th	—
2010–11	4 – Vojvodina West	30	15	0	15	63	57	45	6th	—
2011–12	4 – Vojvodina West	30	17	7	6	58	28	58	1st	—
2012–13	3 – Vojvodina	30	14	7	9	43	28	49	3rd	—
2013–14	3 – Vojvodina	30	13	8	9	35	32	47	4th	Round of 32
2014–15	3 – Vojvodina	30	12	9	9	43	27	45	6th	—
2015–16	3 – Vojvodina	30	14	9	7	41	33	50 (Note: The club was docked one point.)	3rd	—
2016–17	3 – Vojvodina	28	10	6	12	35	49	36	7th	—
2017–18	3 – Vojvodina	30	9	4	17	39	49	31	15th	—
2018–19	3 – Vojvodina	32	11	7	14	40	41	40	11th	—
2019–20	3 – Vojvodina	17 (Note: The season was cut short due to the COVID-19 pandemic in Serbia.)	6	4	7	19	24	22	10th (Note: The club was administratively promoted to fill the vacant spot left by Novi Pazar.)	—
2020–21	2	34	14	5	15	39	30	47	9th	—
2021–22	2	37	13	9	15	42	45	48	7th	Preliminary round
2022–23	2	37	13	14	10	43	38	53	5th	Round of 16
2023–24	2	37	13	11	13	30	32	50	7th	Round of 16
2024–25	2	37	8	16	13	29	35	40	10th	Round of 32

== Notable players ==
For a list of all FK Radnički Sremska Mitrovica players with a Wikipedia article, see Category:FK Radnički Sremska Mitrovica players.

== Historical list of coaches ==
- (Serbia) Zoran Đurić
- (Serbia) Dragan Mojić
- (Serbia) Svetislav Petković
- (Serbia) Željko Milošević
- (Serbia) Mita Ninković (2015)
- (Serbia) Milan Mitrović (2015–2016)
- (Serbia) Darko Baljak (2016–2017)
- (Serbia) Vladimir Jocić (2017)
- (Serbia) Darko Baljak (2017)
- (Serbia) Vladimir Madžarević (2017)
- (Serbia) Dragan Ivanović (2018)
- (Serbia) Dragan Milošević (2018)
- (Serbia) Petar Jeftić (2018)
- (Serbia) Neđo Vuković (2018–2019)
- (Serbia) Jovo Čučković (2019)
- (Serbia) Nenad Kovačević (2019–2020)
- (Serbia) Goran Dragoljić (2020)
- (Serbia) Dušan Kljajić (2020–2021)
- (Serbia) Bogdan Korak (2021)
- (Serbia) Dragan Cvetić (caretaker) (2021)
- (Serbia) Dragan Perišić (2021)
- (Serbia) Dejan Nikolić (2022–2023)
- (Serbia) Darko Tešović (2023)
- (Serbia) Goran Janković (2023)
- (Serbia) Dejan Nikolić (2023–2024)
- (Serbia) Vidak Bratić (2024)
- (Serbia) Dragan Vukmir (2024-2025)
