= Apatin =

Apatin Апатин (Serbian) Abthausen
- Town and municipality
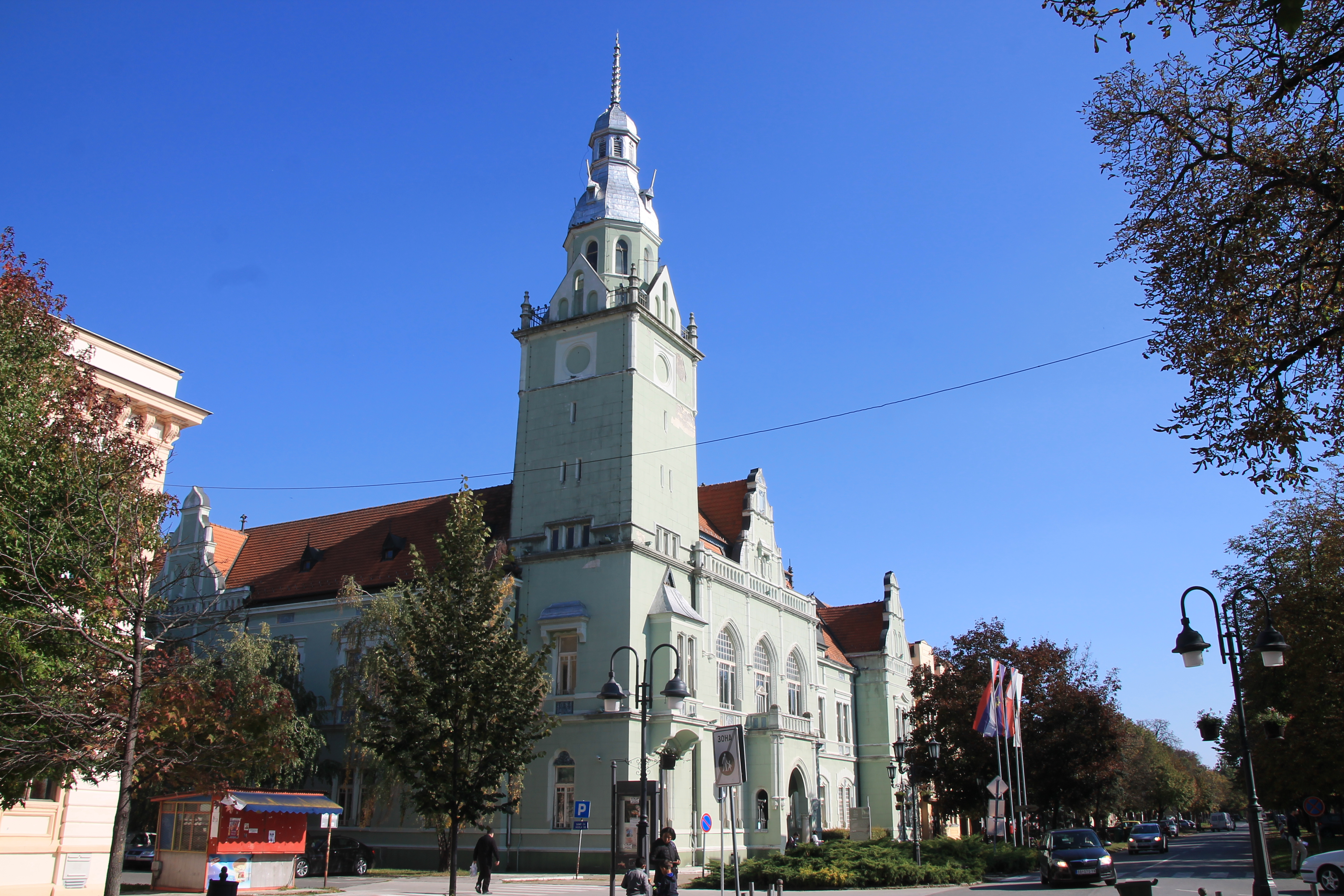
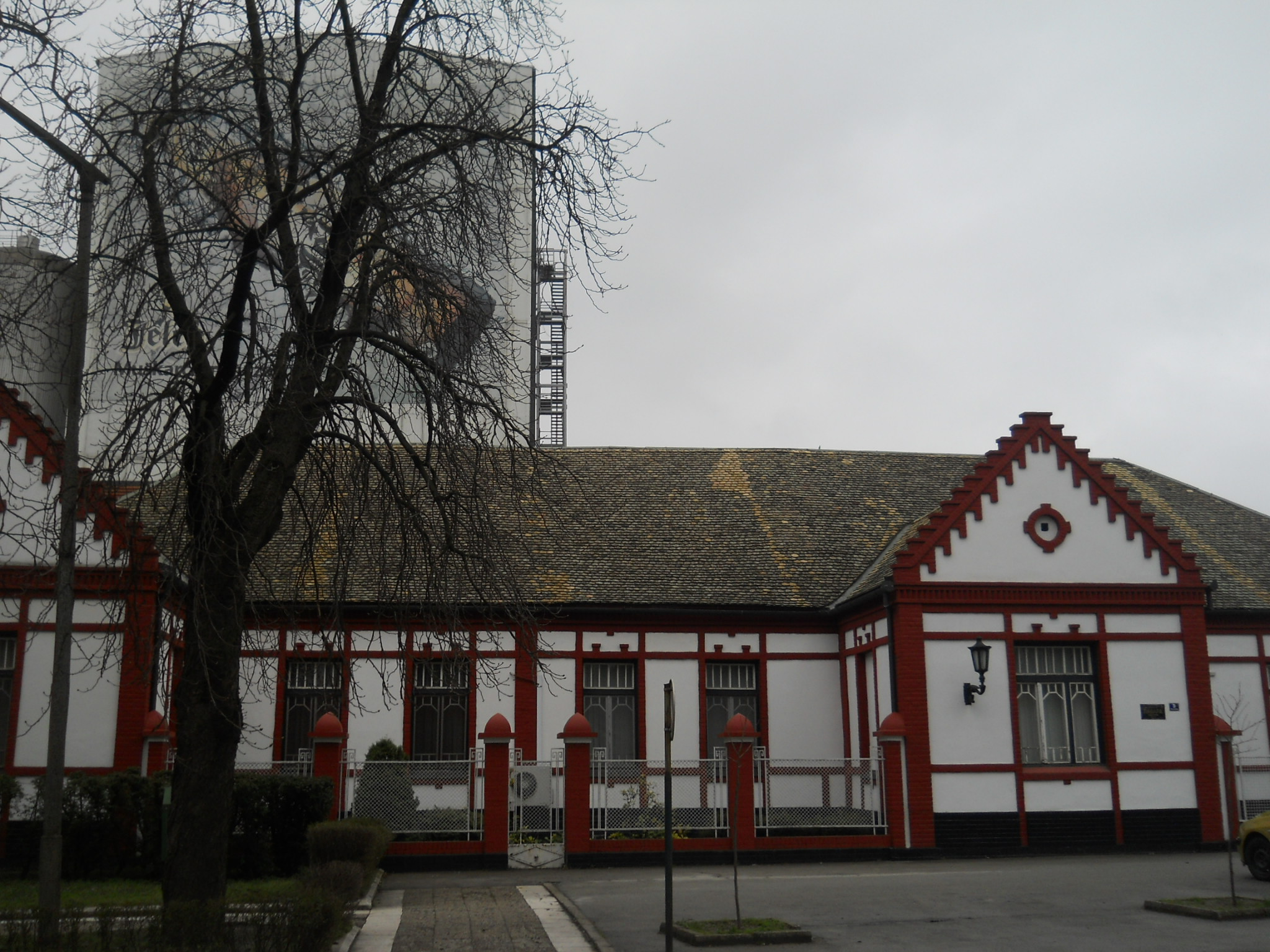
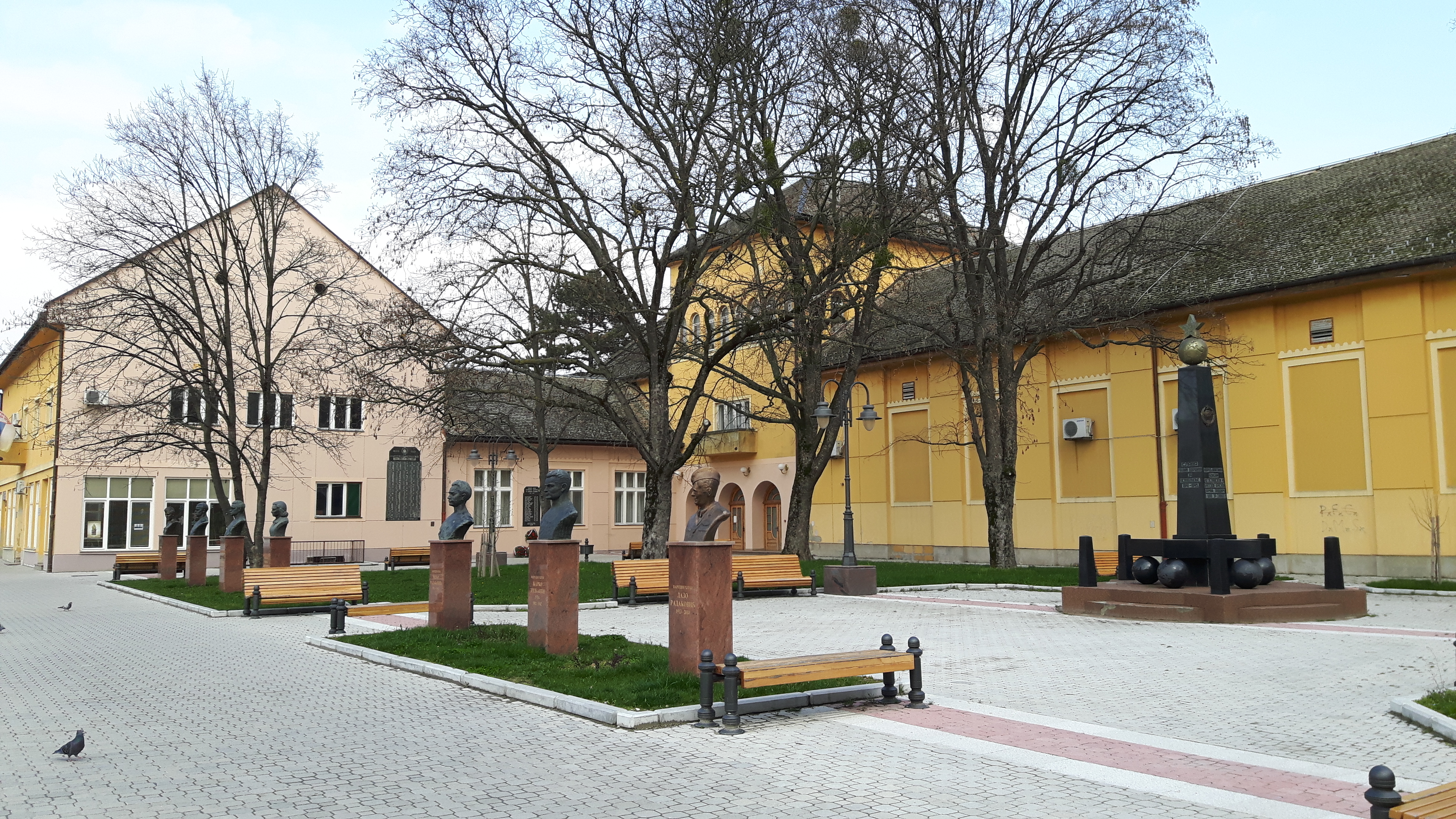
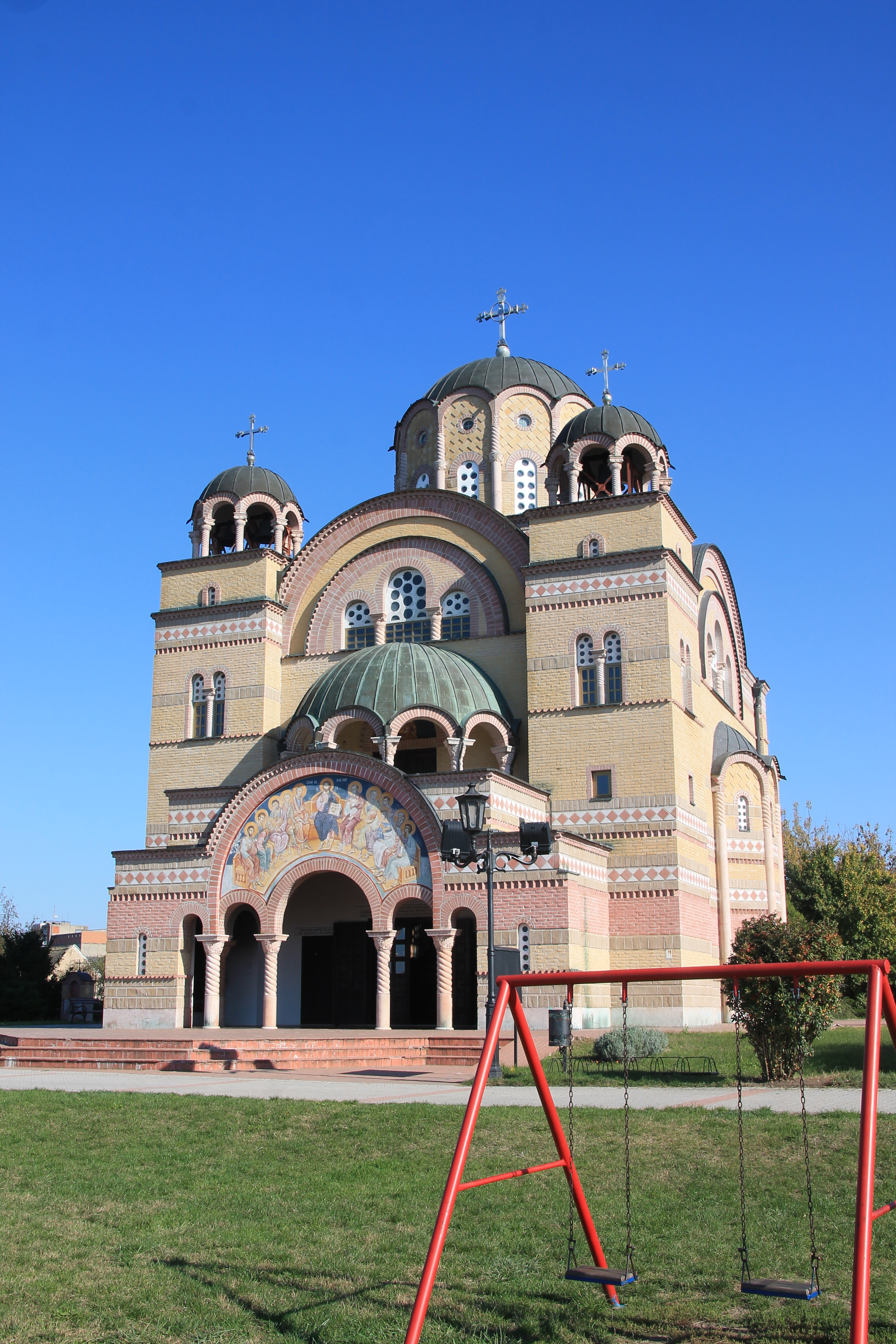
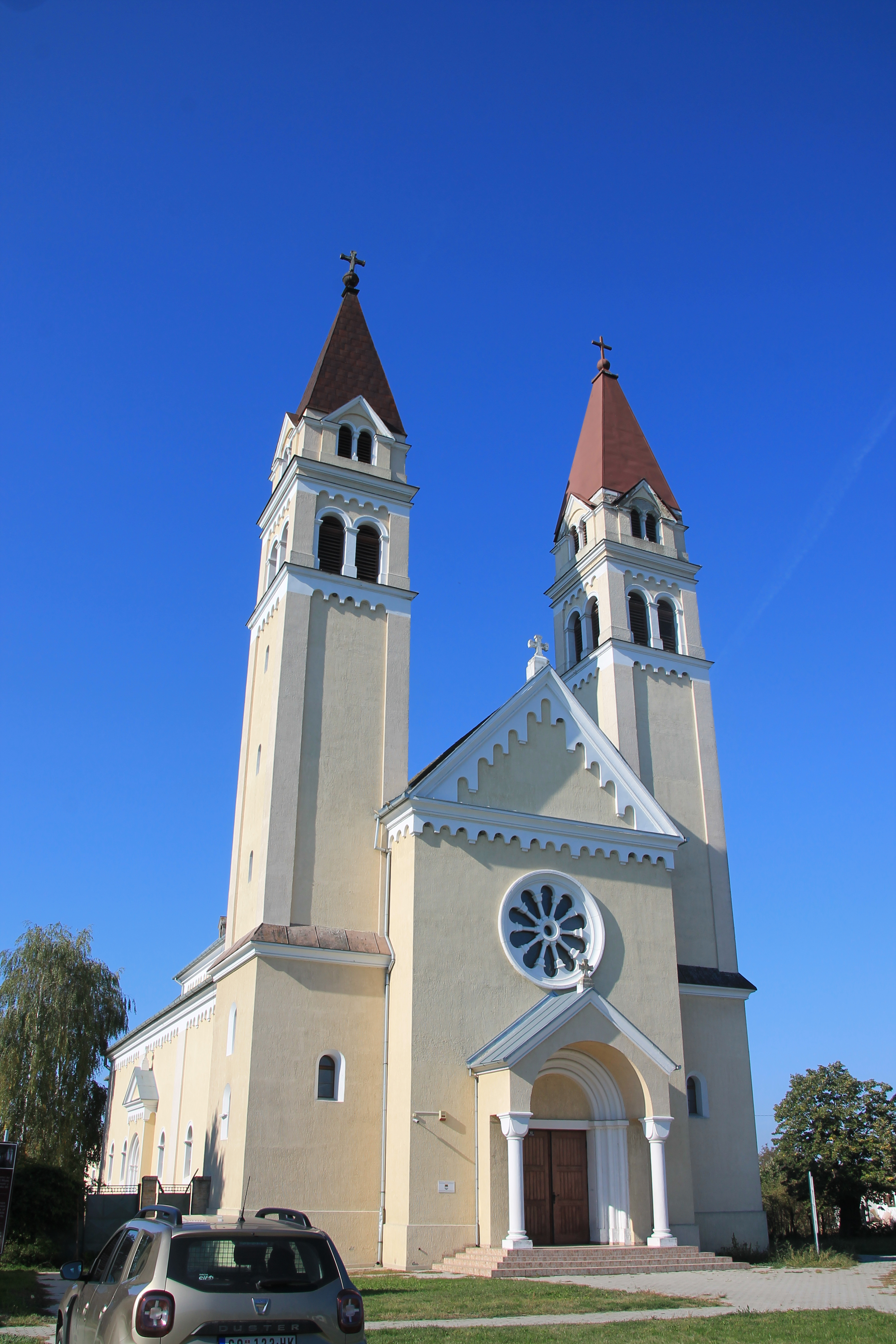
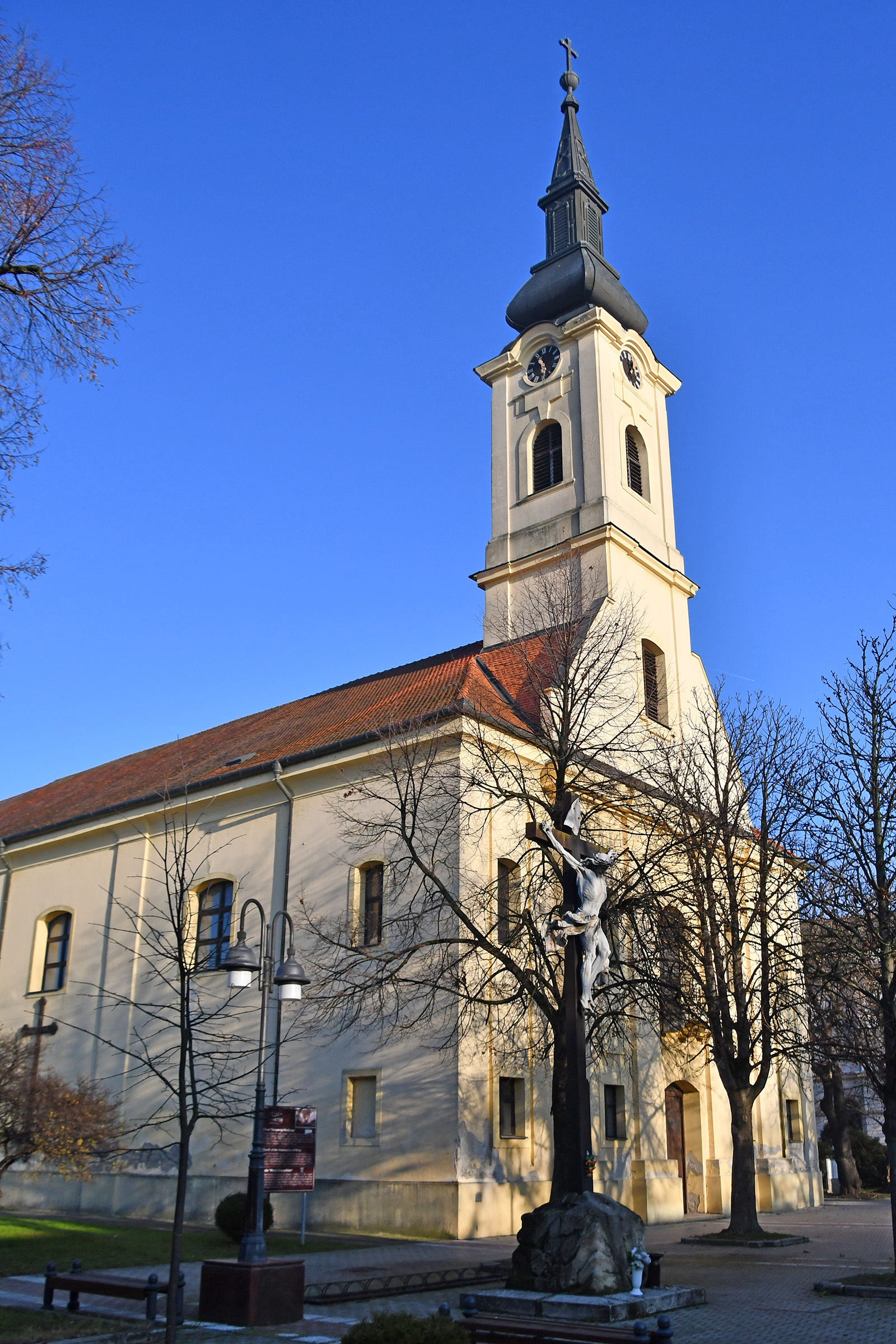
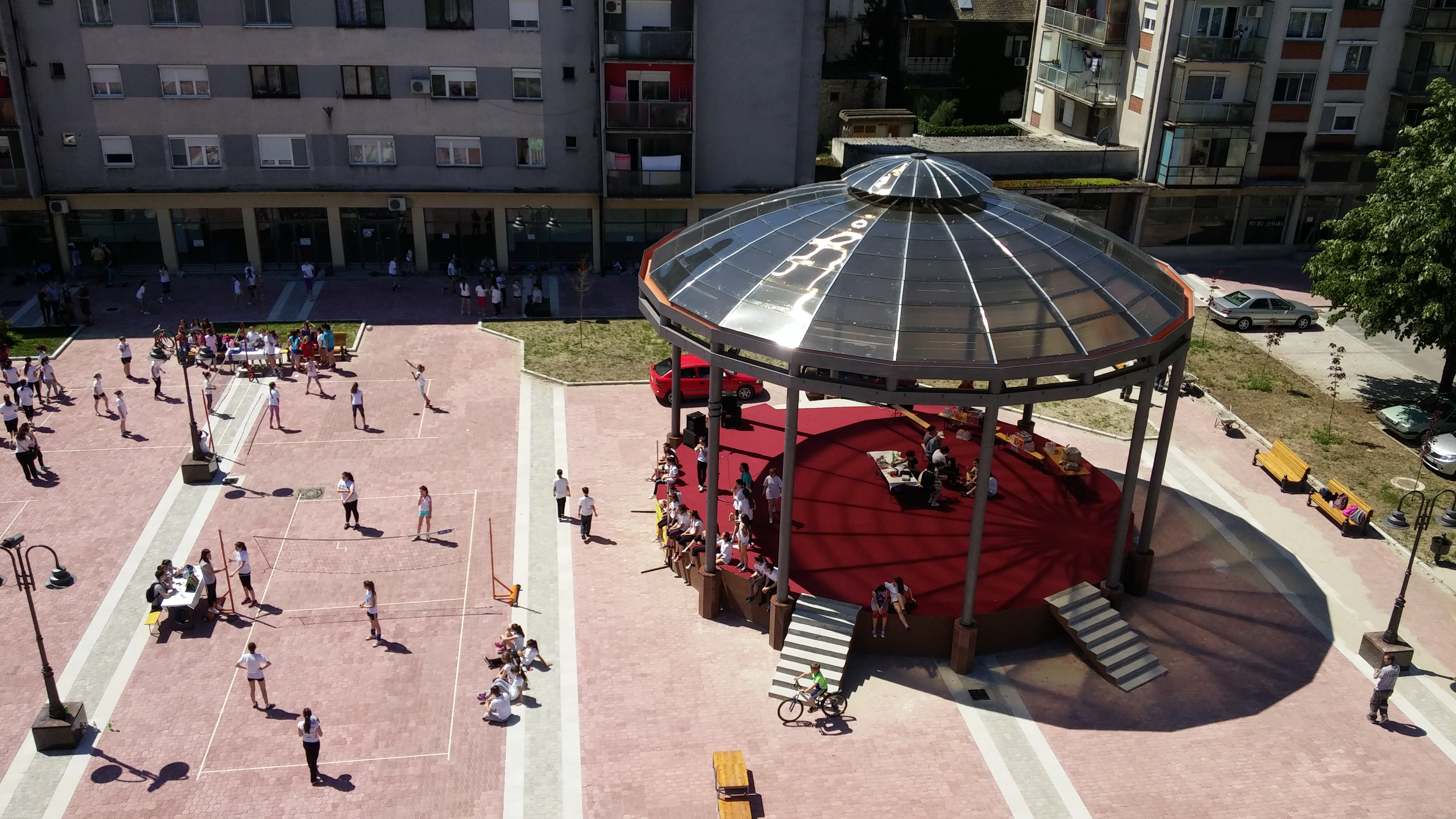
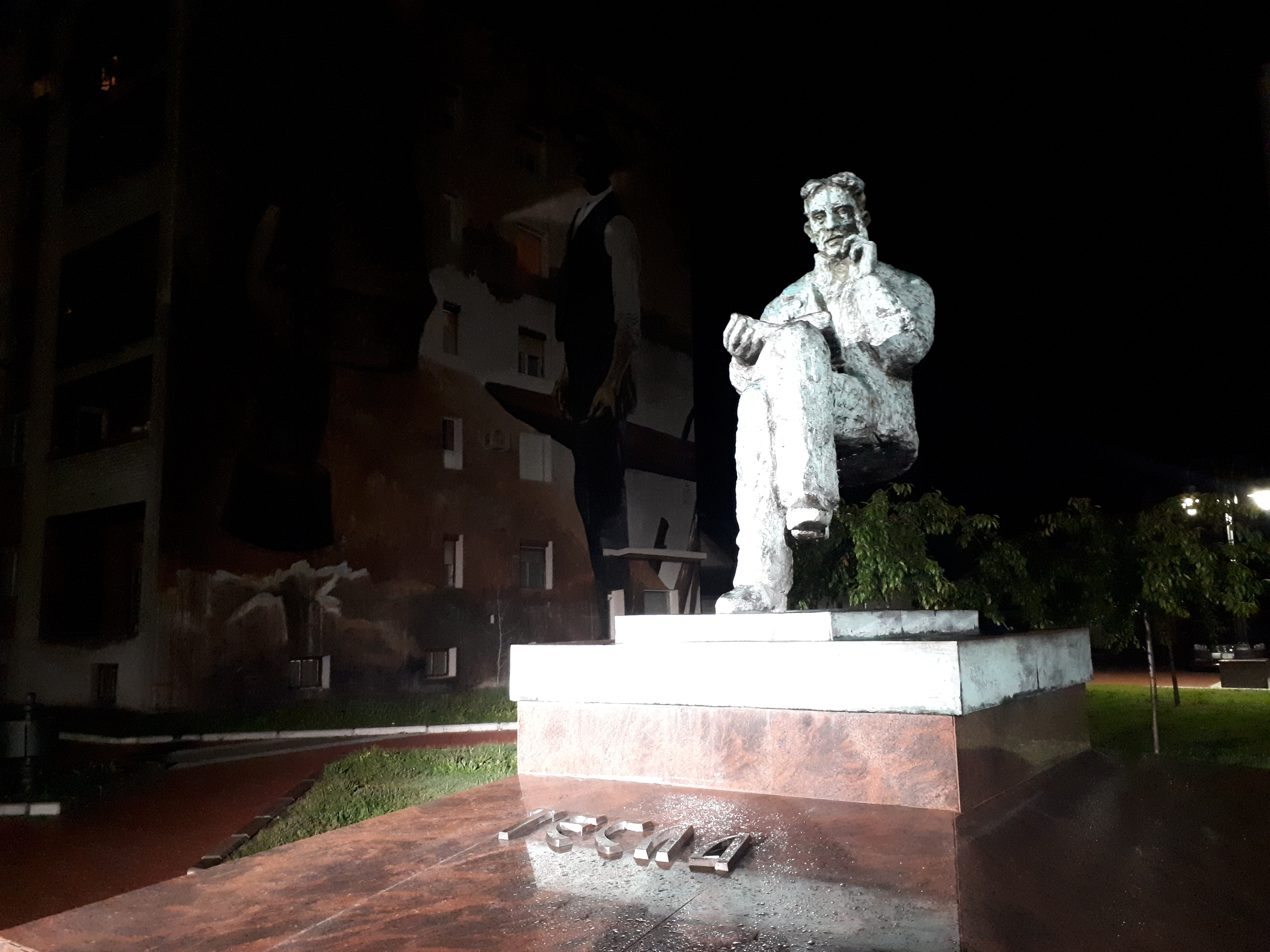
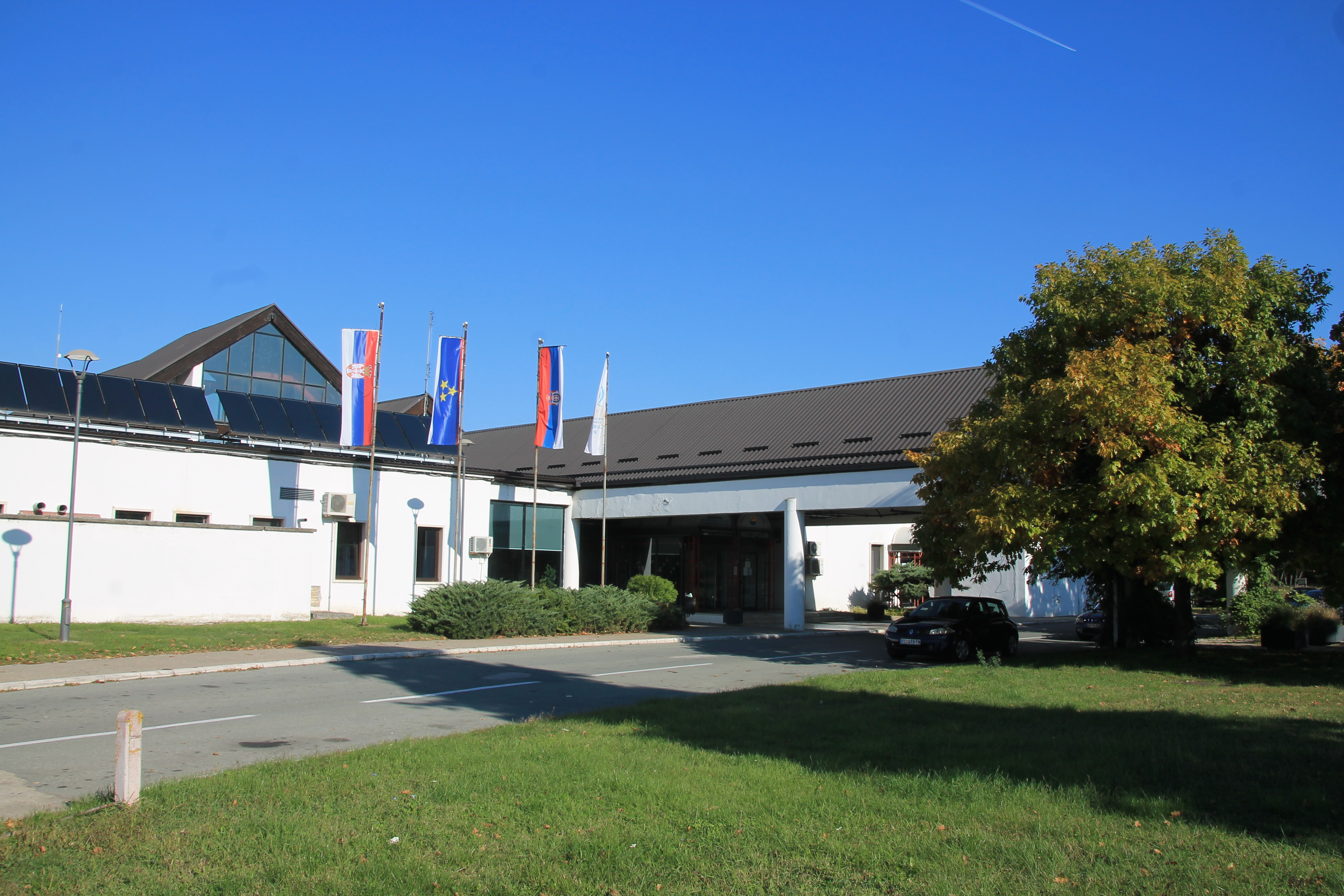
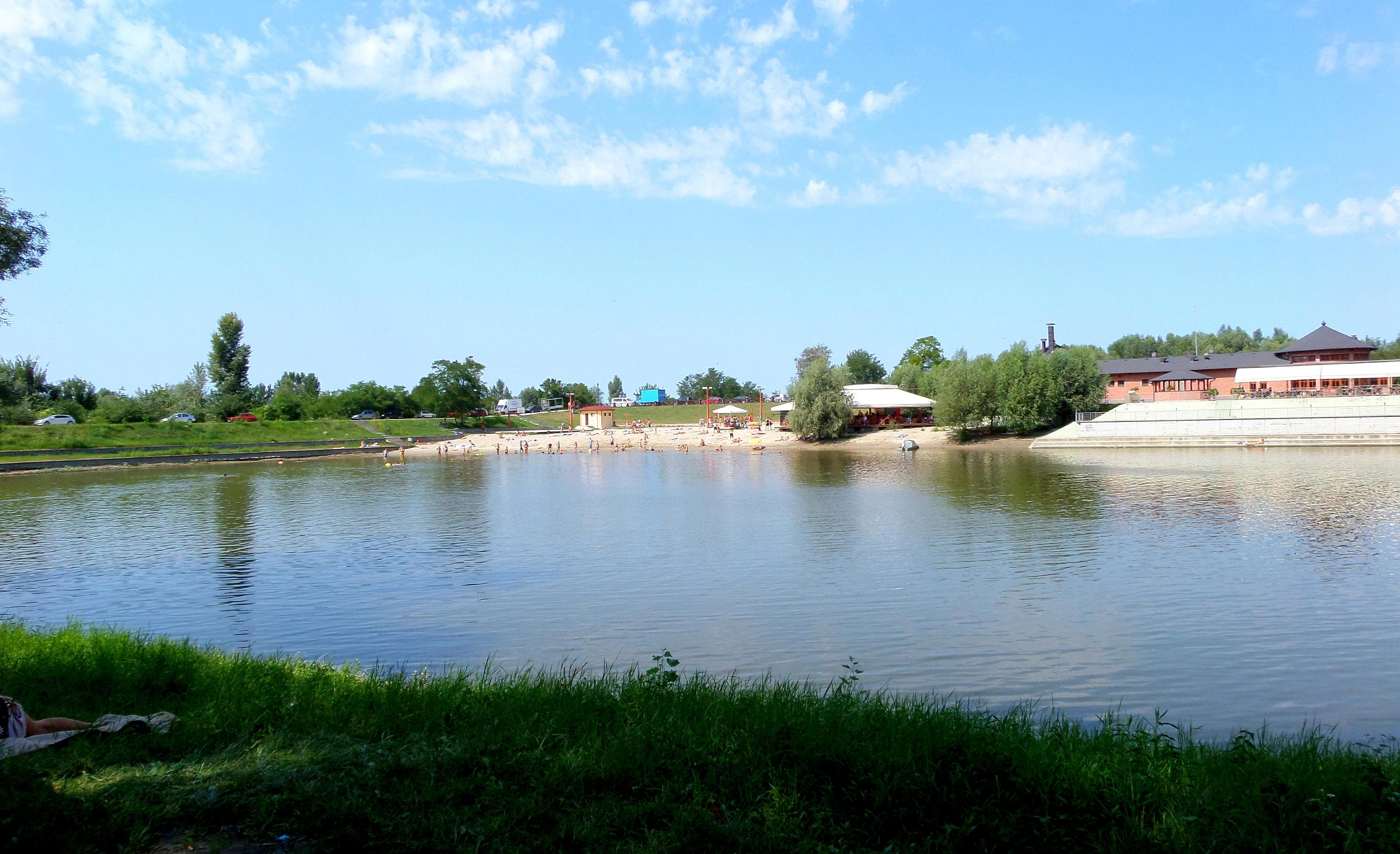
- Apatin Town Hall Apatin Brewery Freedom Square in Apatin Church of the Holy Apostles Church of the Heart of Jesus Church of the Assumption of Mary Nikola Tesla Square in Apatin Nikola Tesla Statue in Apatin Junaković Spa Danube in Apatin

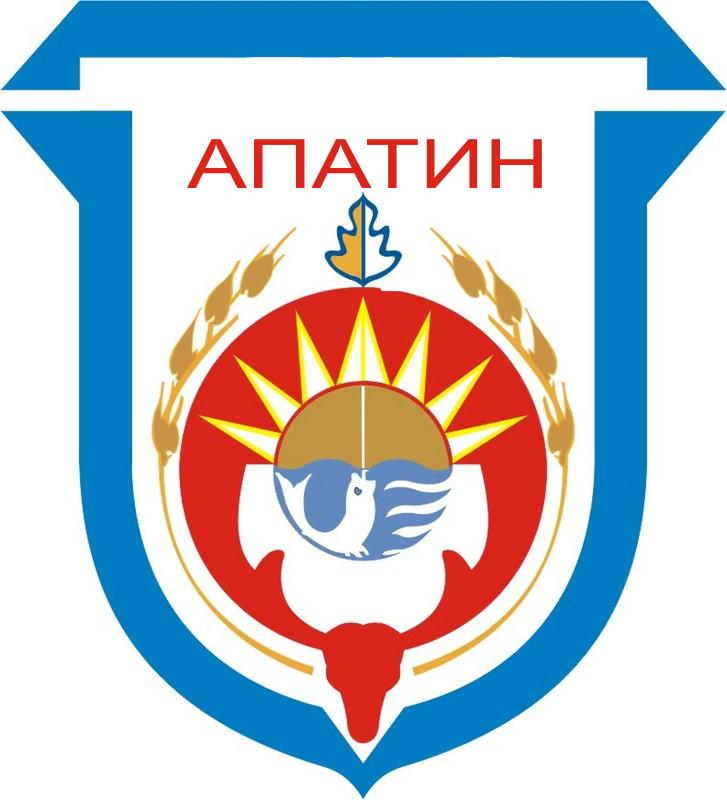
- Coat of arms

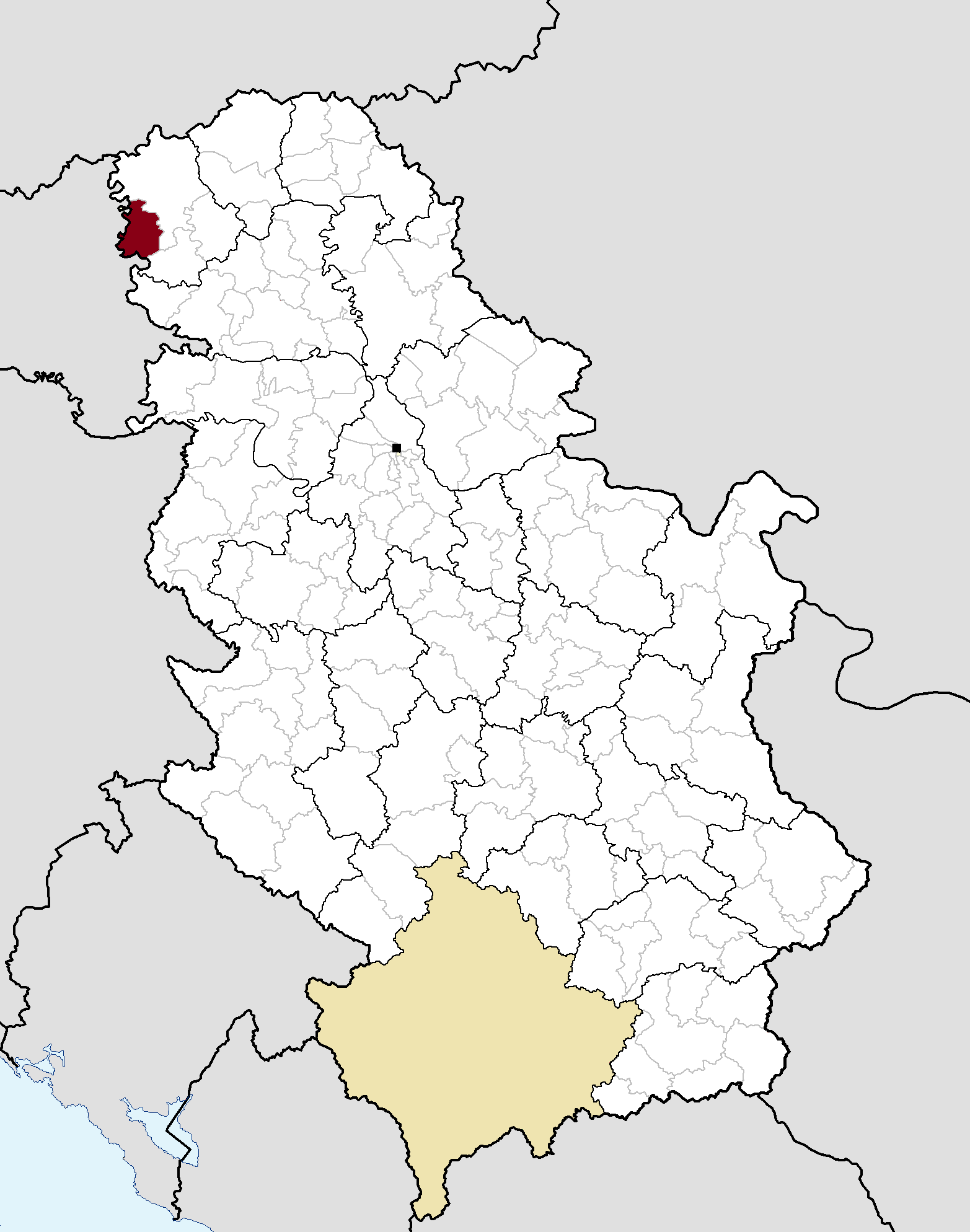
- Location of the municipality of Apatin within Serbia
- Coordinates: 45°40′N 18°59′E
- Country: Serbia
- Province: Vojvodina
- Region: Bačka (Podunavlje)
- District: West Bačka
- Municipality: Apatin
- Settlements: 5

Government
  - Municipal president: Dubravka Korać (SNS)

Area
  - Town: 112.93 km^{2} (43.60 sq mi)
  - Municipality: 379.00 km^{2} (146.33 sq mi)
- Elevation: 82 m (269 ft)

Population (2022 census)
  - Town: 14,613
  - Town density: 129.40/km^{2} (335.14/sq mi)
  - Municipality: 23,155
  - Municipality density: 61.095/km^{2} (158.24/sq mi)
- Time zone: UTC+1 (CET)
  - Summer (DST): UTC+2 (CEST)
- Postal code: 25260
- Area code: +381 25
- Car plates: SO
- Official languages: Serbian together with Hungarian in Kupusina and Svilojevo and Croatian in Sonta
- Website: www.soapatin.org

Apatin (Serbian Cyrillic: Апатин, Hungarian: Apatin, Croatian: Apatin) is a town and municipality located in the West Bačka District of the autonomous province of Vojvodina, Serbia. As of 2022 census, the population of the town is 14,613, while the municipality has 23,155 inhabitants.

== Name ==
In Serbian, the town is known as Apatin (Апатин), while the same name is also used in Romanian, Croatian (Šokac), and Hungarian. In German it was called Abthausen. According to some claims, the name Apatin is derived from the old form Opaty, by which the town was first mentioned in the 11th century.

== Geography ==
The Municipality of Apatin is located on the left bank of the Danube river between the municipalities of Sombor (to the northeast) and Odžaci (to the southeast).

Apatin is situated in the north-western part of the spacious plain in Bačka, on the left side of the Danube. It is in the autonomous province of Vojvodina.

== History ==
The favourable geographic position, proximity to the Danube, and natural wealth of this area (fruitful ground, woods next to the river, abundance of fish in swampy regions and backwaters, and game in woods) attracted people through all ages and inspired them to settle here. Because of these reasons, even in pre-historic times, cultures such as the Sarmatians, the Celts, the Goths and many others were replacing each other within this region, one by one.

In the first century, during the Roman conquest, the settlement was turned into a military trench with fortifications, and played an important role in the defense of the Pannonia province. Subsequently, the area came under control of the Huns, Gepids and Avars. In the sixth century the Slavs settled, and in the ninth century, the area was included into the Bulgarian Empire. Bulgarian duke Salan who had residence in Titel ruled over region of Bačka. In the tenth century the Hungarians came to Central Europe, thereby establishing a state, which was populated by both, Hungarians and Slavs.

The first mentioning of Apatin in any written script was in the year 1011, by the Abbey of Kalocsa Bishopric. According to other source, Apatin was firstly mentioned in 1407. During this time, settlement was part of the Bodrogiensis County within the medieval Kingdom of Hungary.

During the 14th and 15th centuries, the area became feudalistic, and in exchange for lands, the vassals would need to complete military service to the lord of the property. Many fishermen, hunters, and millers then began to settle down in this area.

In 1417, Apatin is mentioned as a property of Stefan Lazarević, who was crowned as the Despot of Serbia in 1402. In 1526-1527 it belonged to the short-lived Serb state of Emperor Jovan Nenad, and soon after (in 1541) this area became part of the Ottoman Empire. During the Ottoman administration Apatin was part of the Sanjak of Segedin and was mainly populated by ethnic Serbs.

In the end of the 17th century it became part of the Habsburg monarchy. Many of the refugees during the massive migration of Serbs led by Arsenije Čarnojević in 1690, came to Apatin, Sombor and Prigrevica, thus the Serb population in this area increased. A new wave of colonisation occurred in 1748 when many German colonists settled in Apatin, pushing out the Serbs mostly by force, who then evacuated towards Stapar.

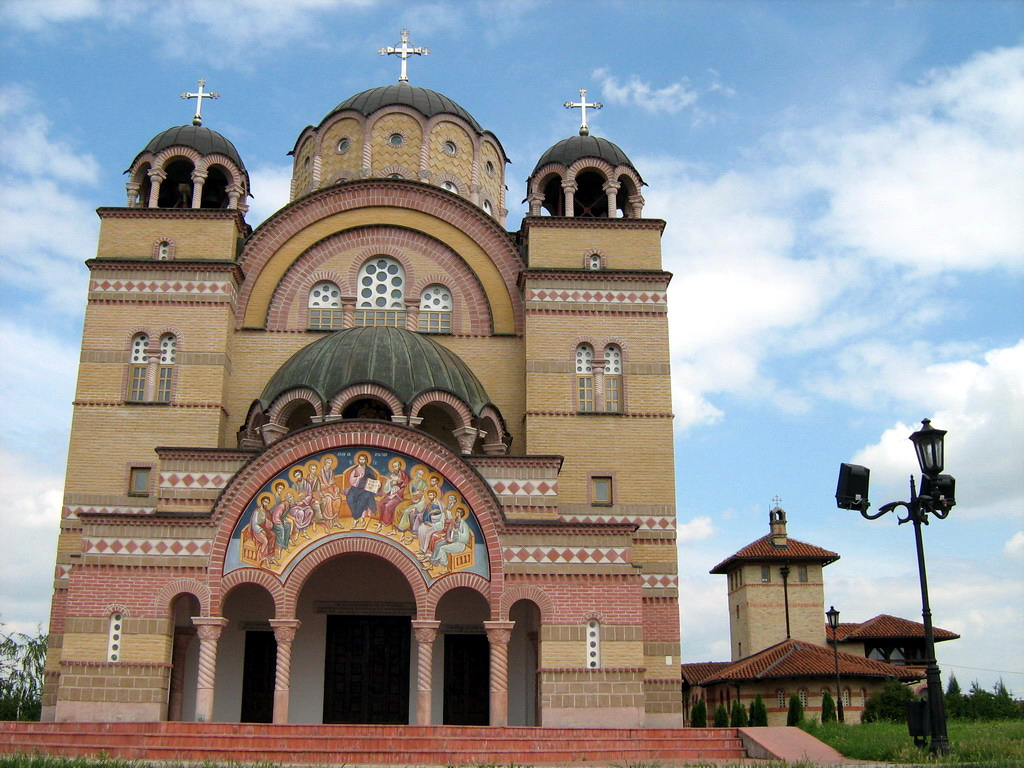
The Orthodox Christian Temple.

The German colonists came from many different regions. The gathering centre was in Ulm, Germany and from that point they were transported by the Danube to Apatin, which became the main base of the German expansion in Vojvodina. The church was built near the port and the city square was also built at this time. The real estate value of buildings, such as schools, fishermen's station, hand craft's workshops, began to rise.

The Chamber of Court decided to put forth economic objectives to better the economy, and in 1756 the brewery and distillery were built. In 1764 a large textiles factory was built. In 1760 Apatin was officially proclaimed a town and a main trade centre with a special status.

At the end of the 18th century, a catastrophic flood destroyed the old town square, and ruined half of the settlement. The new square was built north-westward from the brewery. The town as seen today, began to take shape. During the 18th and in the early part of 19th century, Apatin had prospered economically, mostly because of developed trade, handcraft and shipbuilding.

During the initial years of the Habsburg administration, Apatin was administratively a part of the Batsch County within the Habsburg Kingdom of Hungary. Subsequently, it was included into the newly formed Batsch-Bodrog County. In 1848-1849 Apatin was part of the Serbian Voivodship, a Serb autonomous region within Austrian Empire, and between 1849 and 1860 it was part of the Voivodeship of Serbia and Banat of Temeschwar, a separate Austrian province. After abolishment of the voivodeship, in 1860 it was again included into Batsch-Bodrog County within the Habsburg Kingdom of Hungary, which became one of two autonomous parts of the Monarchy after 1867.

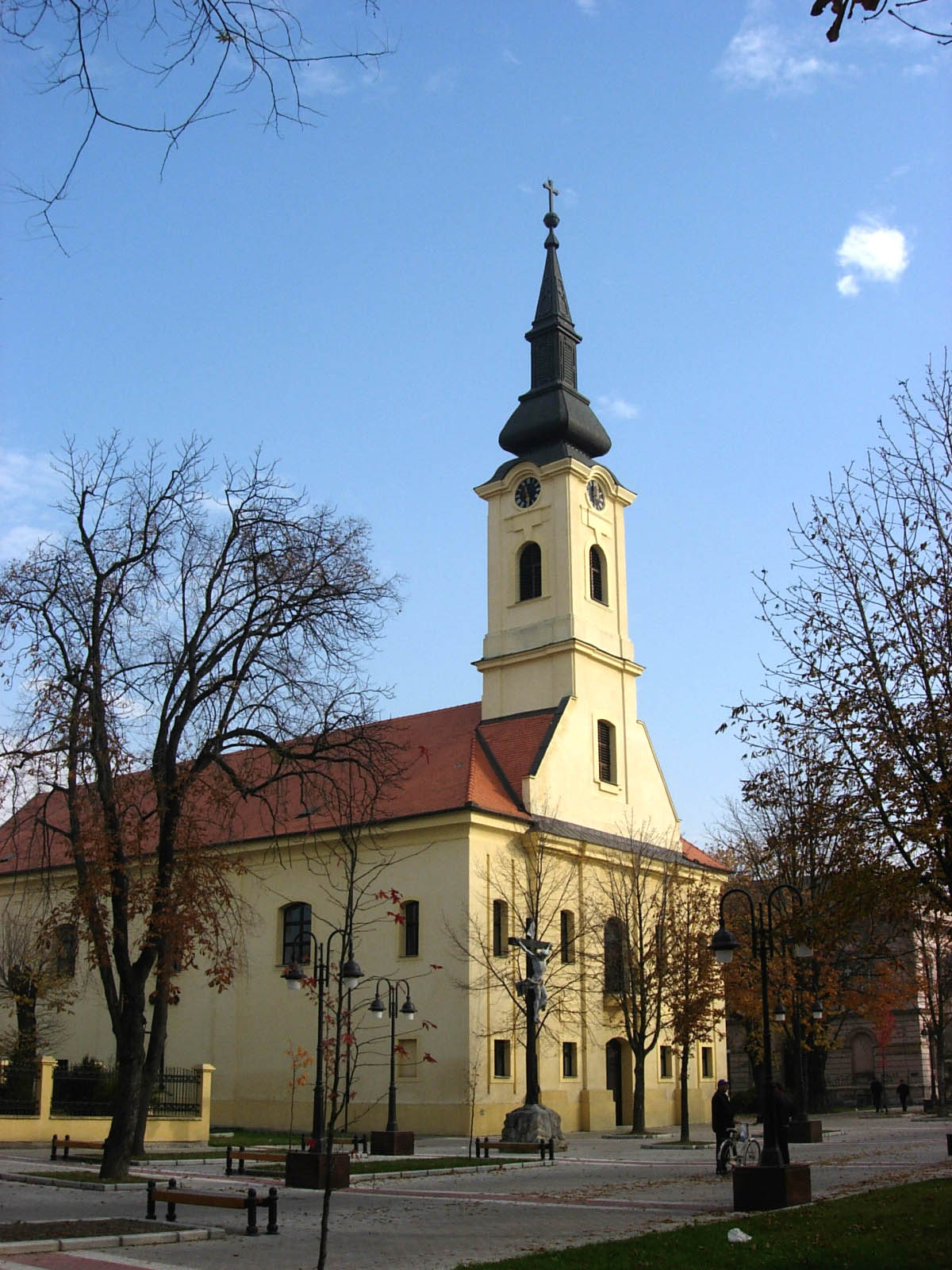
The Assumption of Blessed Virgin Mary Catholic Church in the centre of the town.

In the year of 1869 numerous banks and saving-banks were established, and that opened the door to industrial development. A great number of brickyards produced brick and tile, which were used to construct many buildings in Vienna and almost all in Pest. In 1912 Apatin was connected to Sombor and Sonta by the railroad, and the following year, a shipyard was founded. Today, the shipyard has been modernized as it the only shipyard on the whole Danube which has a special lift for quickly drawing boats out onto the docks. According to 1910 census, most of the inhabitants of Apatin spoke the German language.

In 1918, as part of Banat, Bačka and Baranja, Apatin became part of the Kingdom of Serbia, which later together with the Kingdom of Montenegro and the State of Slovenes, Croats and Serbs formed the Kingdom of Serbs, Croats and Slovenes (renamed to Yugoslavia in 1929). In 1918–1919, Apatin was part of the Banat, Bačka and Baranja region and also (from 1918 to 1922) part of the Novi Sad District. Between 1922 and 1929, the town was part of the Bačka Oblast and between 1929 and 1941, part of the Danube Banovina, one of the provinces of the Kingdom of Yugoslavia.

When Axis powers invaded, occupied and partitioned Yugoslavia in 1941, Apatin was included into Bács-Bodrog County within the Horthy's Hungary. The town remained under Axis control until 1944. During the Battle of Batina, the front was stretched all the way to Apatin and Bogojevo, and these places became military bases overnight. Yugoslav Partisans entered Apatin on October 24, 1944, and since then Apatin was part of the Yugoslav Autonomous Province of Vojvodina, which (from 1945) was part of the People's Republic of Serbia within the new Socialist Yugoslavia.

In 1944, as a consequence of World War II events in Yugoslavia, one part of Yugoslav citizens of German ethnicity left from the area, together with defeated German army. The antifascist council for deliberation of Yugoslavia (AVNOJ) declared the remaining German population as public enemies and sent them to communist prison camps, where one part of them died from disease, cold and malnutrition. The death toll among the German population of Apatin amounts to 2,074 people known by name. This figure includes the victims of deportation to the USSR. After prison camps were dissolved (in 1948), most of the remaining German population left Yugoslavia in subsequent decades, mainly because of economic reasons. After the war, Apatin was populated by (mainly Serb) settlers from other parts of Yugoslavia, largely from Lika. Population censuses conducted after World War II recorded Serbs as the largest ethnic group in the town.

Between 1992 and 2003, Apatin was part of the Federal Republic of Yugoslavia, between 2003 and 2006 part of the State Union of Serbia and Montenegro, and since 2006 it is part of an independent Serbia.

== Inhabited places ==
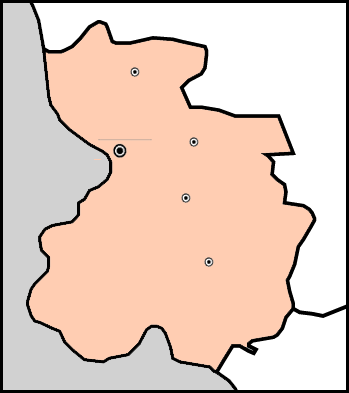

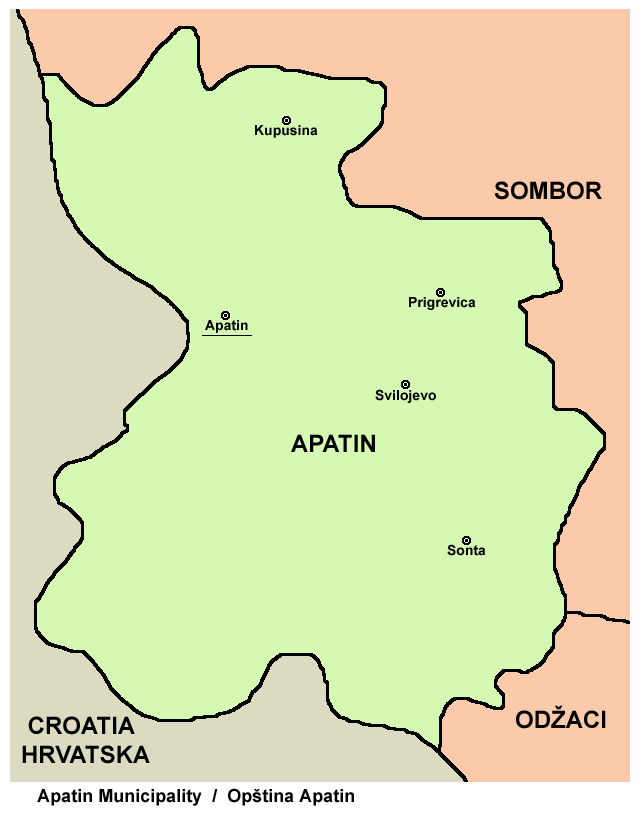
Map of Apatin municipality

Apatin municipality includes the city of Apatin and the following villages:

- Kupusina
- Prigrevica
- Svilojevo
- Sonta

== Demographics ==
Historical population
Year	Pop.	±% p.a.
1948	31,145	—
1953	32,612	+0.92%
1961	34,836	+0.83%
1971	34,279	−0.16%
1981	33,843	−0.13%
1991	32,999	−0.25%
2002	32,813	−0.05%
2011	28,929	−1.39%

According to the last official census done in 2011, the municipality of Apatin has 28,929 inhabitants.

=== Ethnic groups in the municipality ===
As many as 24 ethnic groups live in the Apatin municipality, including:

- Serbs = 18,164 (62.79%)
- Hungarians = 3,102 (10.72%)
- Croats = 3,015 (10.42%)
- Romanians = 1,148 (3.97%)
- Romani = 654 (2.26%)
- Others (including Montenegrins, Macedonians, Bosniaks, Germans, Slovaks, etc.).

=== Settlements by ethnic majority ===
Settlements with a Serb ethnic majority are Apatin and Prigrevica. The settlement with a Croat/Šokac ethnic majority is Sonta. Settlements with Hungarian ethnic majority are Kupusina and Svilojevo.

=== Ethnic groups in the town ===
- Serbs = 13,990 (72.41%)
- Romanians = 967 (5.01%)
- Hungarians = 848 (4.39%)
- Croats = 658 (3.41%)
- Yugoslavs = 612 (3.17%)
- Roma = 369 (1.91%)
- Germans = 142 (0.74%)
- Montenegrins = 100 (0.52%)
- Others.

== Spa ==
Near the city of Apatin lies the Junaković spa. It is a modern and well-equipped rehabilitation and recreation centre with sports fields, outdoor pools, indoor therapy, and saunas.

== Buildings ==
Major buildings in Apatin include the new Orthodox Christian cathedral, the Catholic church of The Assumption of Mary (built in the 18th century), the Apatin city hall, and the Speiser mausoleum.

== Economy ==
As of September 2017, Apatin has one of 14 free economic zones established in Serbia. It covers 160 hectares of ground next to river Danube, and forms so called "Free Port Apatin" (Serbian: "Slobodna zona Apatin").

The largest companies in Apatin today are the Apatin Brewery, "Jedinstvo" (agricultural company) and "Apatin Shipyard" (formerly known as Boris Kidrič Shipyard).

The following table gives a preview of total number of registered people employed in legal entities per their core activity (as of 2018):

Activity	Total
Agriculture, forestry and fishing	559
Mining and quarrying	1
Manufacturing	1,613
Electricity, gas, steam and air conditioning supply	19
Water supply; sewerage, waste management and remediation activities	60
Construction	177
Wholesale and retail trade, repair of motor vehicles and motorcycles	799
Transportation and storage	338
Accommodation and food services	227
Information and communication	22
Financial and insurance activities	75
Real estate activities	11
Professional, scientific and technical activities	169
Administrative and support service activities	223
Public administration and defense; compulsory social security	321
Education	416
Human health and social work activities	396
Arts, entertainment and recreation	63
Other service activities	101
Individual agricultural workers	220
Total	5,812

== Tourist attraction ==
Apatin has popular tourist location, and because of its proximity to the Danube river and the forests, it is gathering place for fishermen and hunters. There is also an annual gathering called Apatinske ribarske večeri (Apatin Fishermen Nights), which has taken place for the last forty some years. Ribarske večeri usually starts on July 1, and lasts five or seven days.

== Sport ==
Apatin has a rich history in sports. Željko Rebrača is by far the most famous athlete from this area, but in the past, Apatin has had athletes represent Yugoslavia (and now Serbia) on the international stage. Today, some of the well known professional sports clubs are:

- OFK Mladost - member of the Serbia First League Soccer Association. competing in the 4th tier
- RK Apatin - member of the Serbia Second League Handball Association

== Notable natives and residents ==
- Paul Abraham, composer of Jewish-Hungarian descent
- Frank Dancevic, Serbian-Canadian tennis player whose father hails from Apatin
- Nenad Medić, poker player
- Gyula Pártos, Hungarian architect
- Lajos Szűcs, Hungarian footballer
- Željko Rebrača, basketball player
- Ervin Šinko, writer of Croatian–Hungarian descent

== Gallery ==
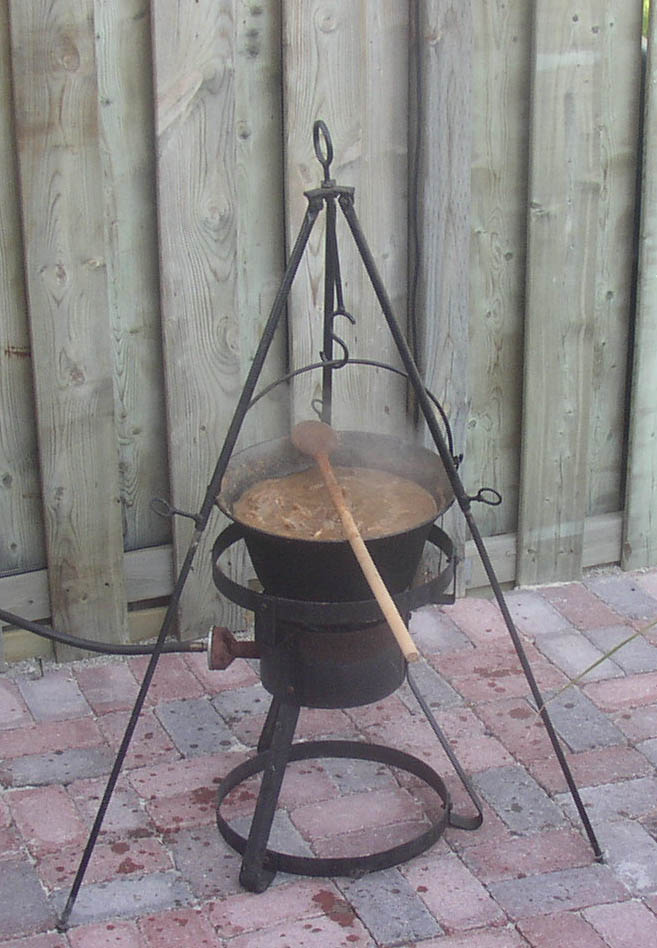
Apatin's fishermen nights (main event pictured, fish soup contest)

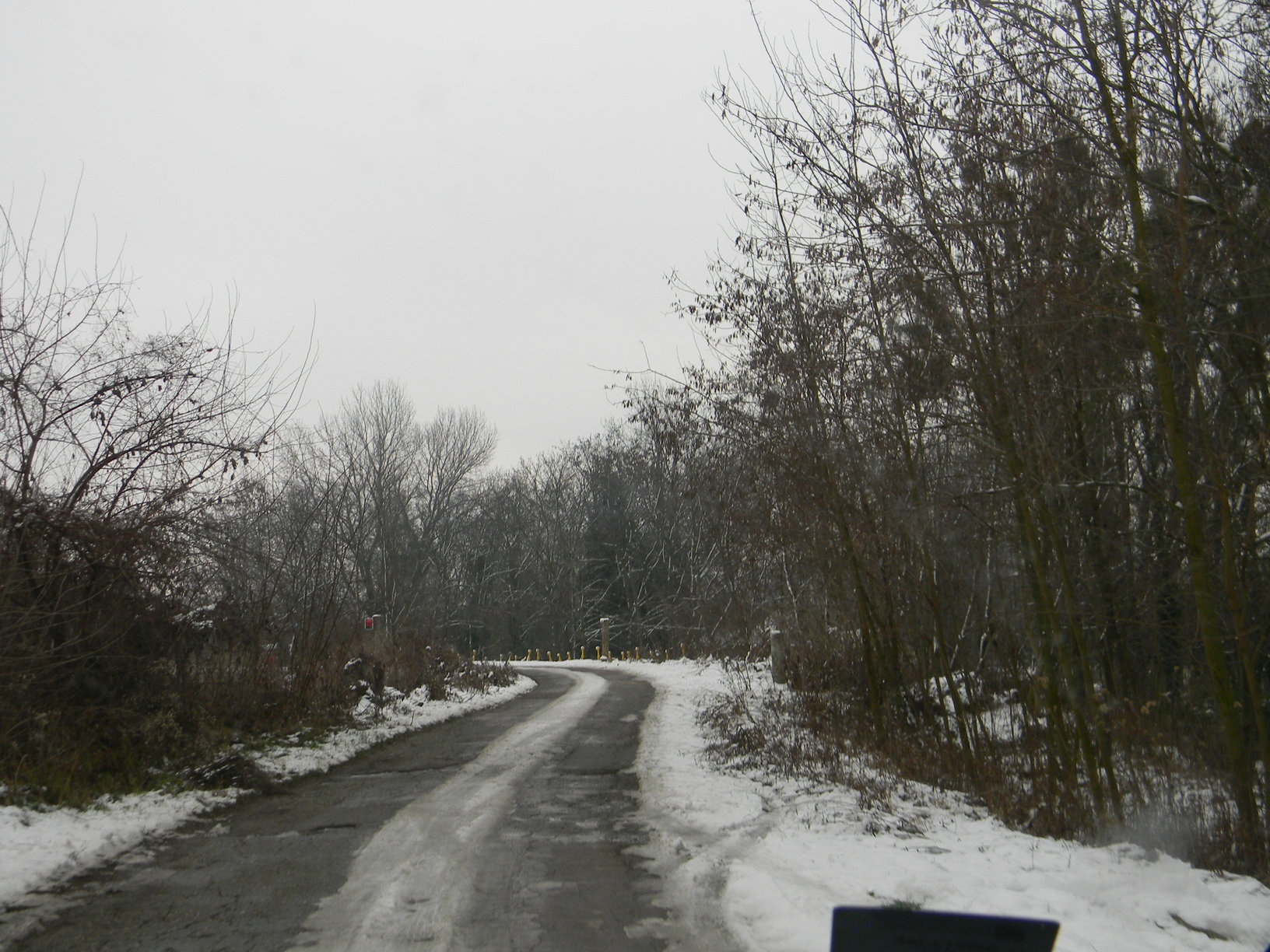
Apatin

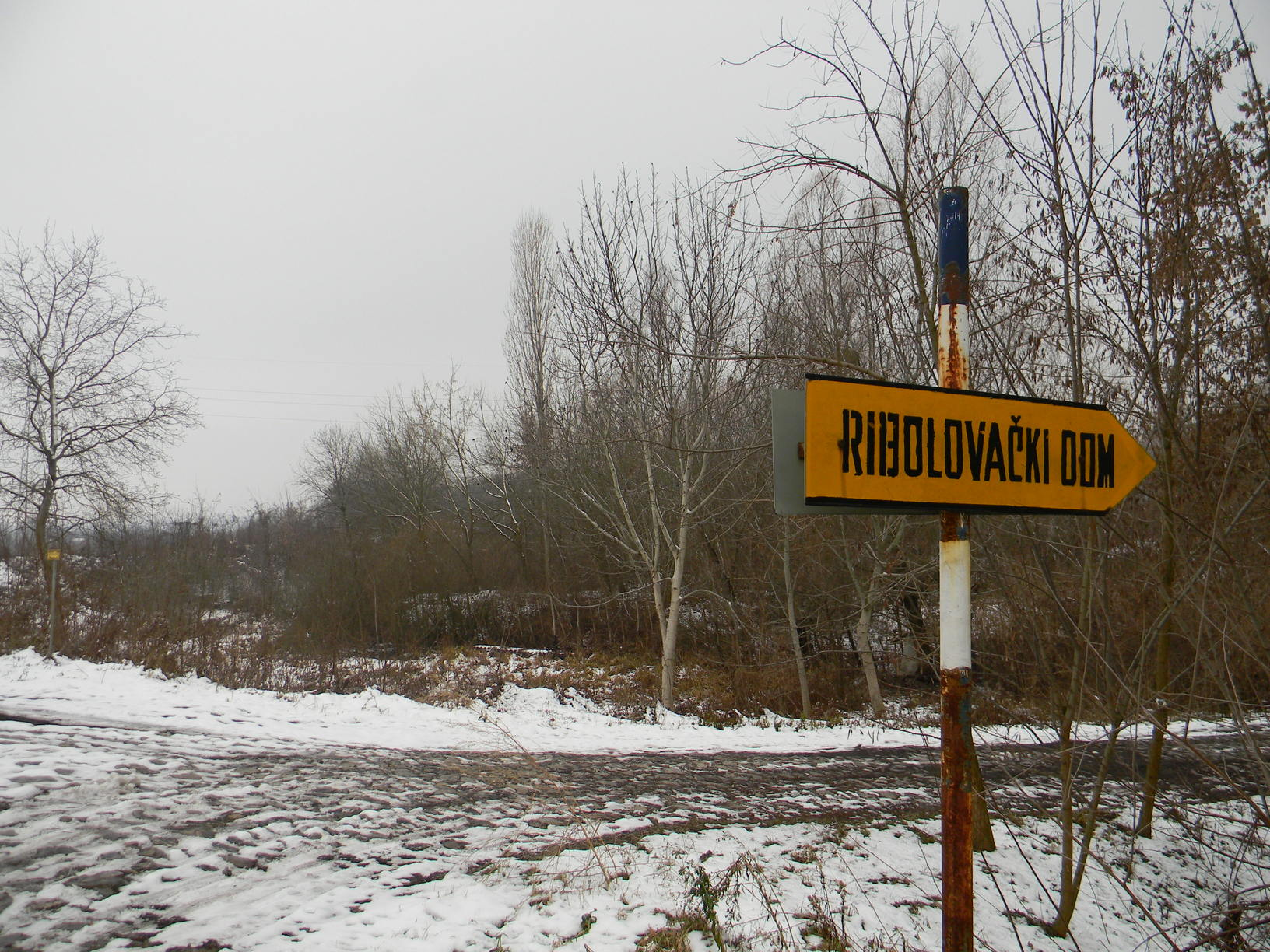
Apatin

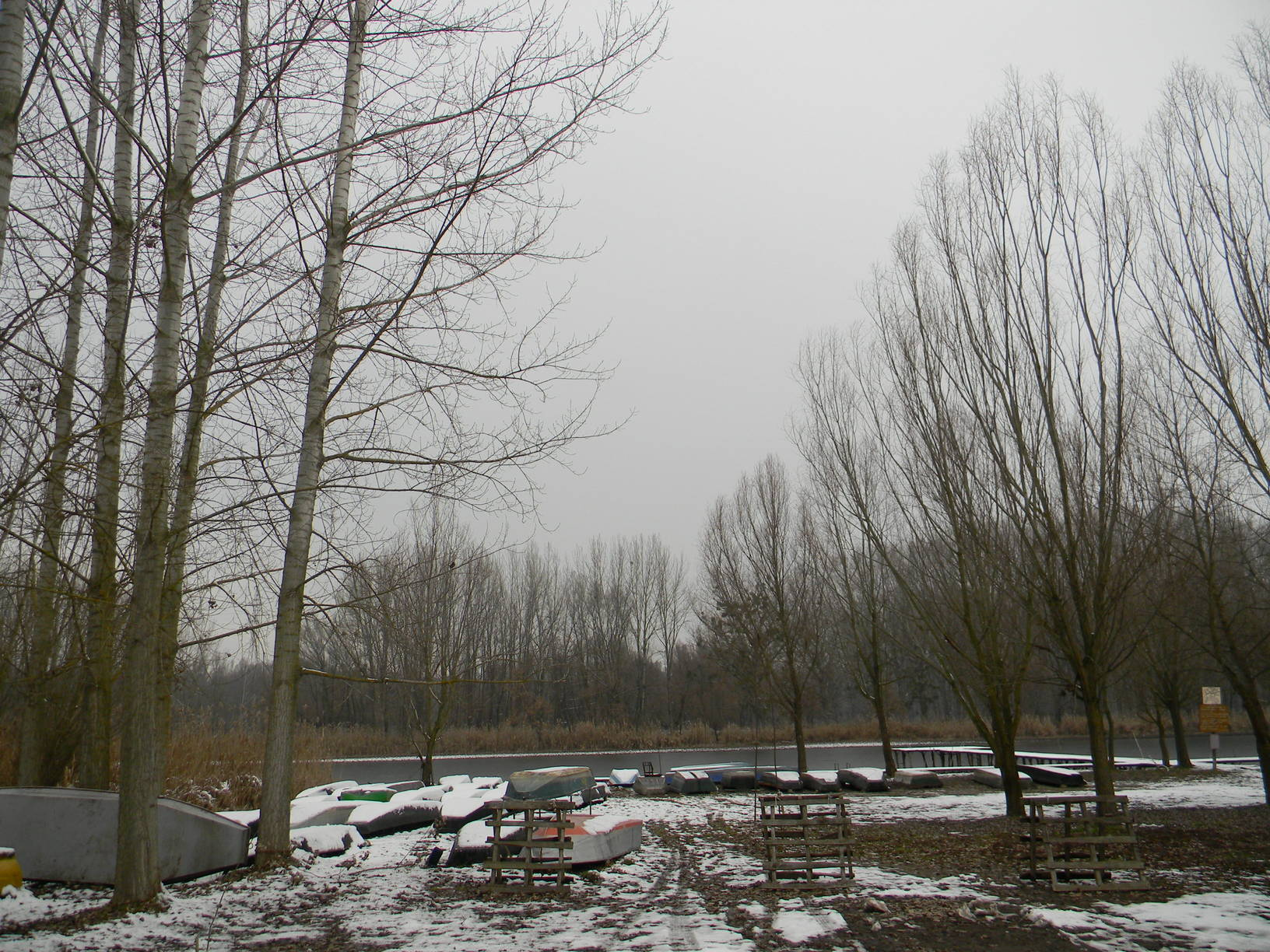
Apatin

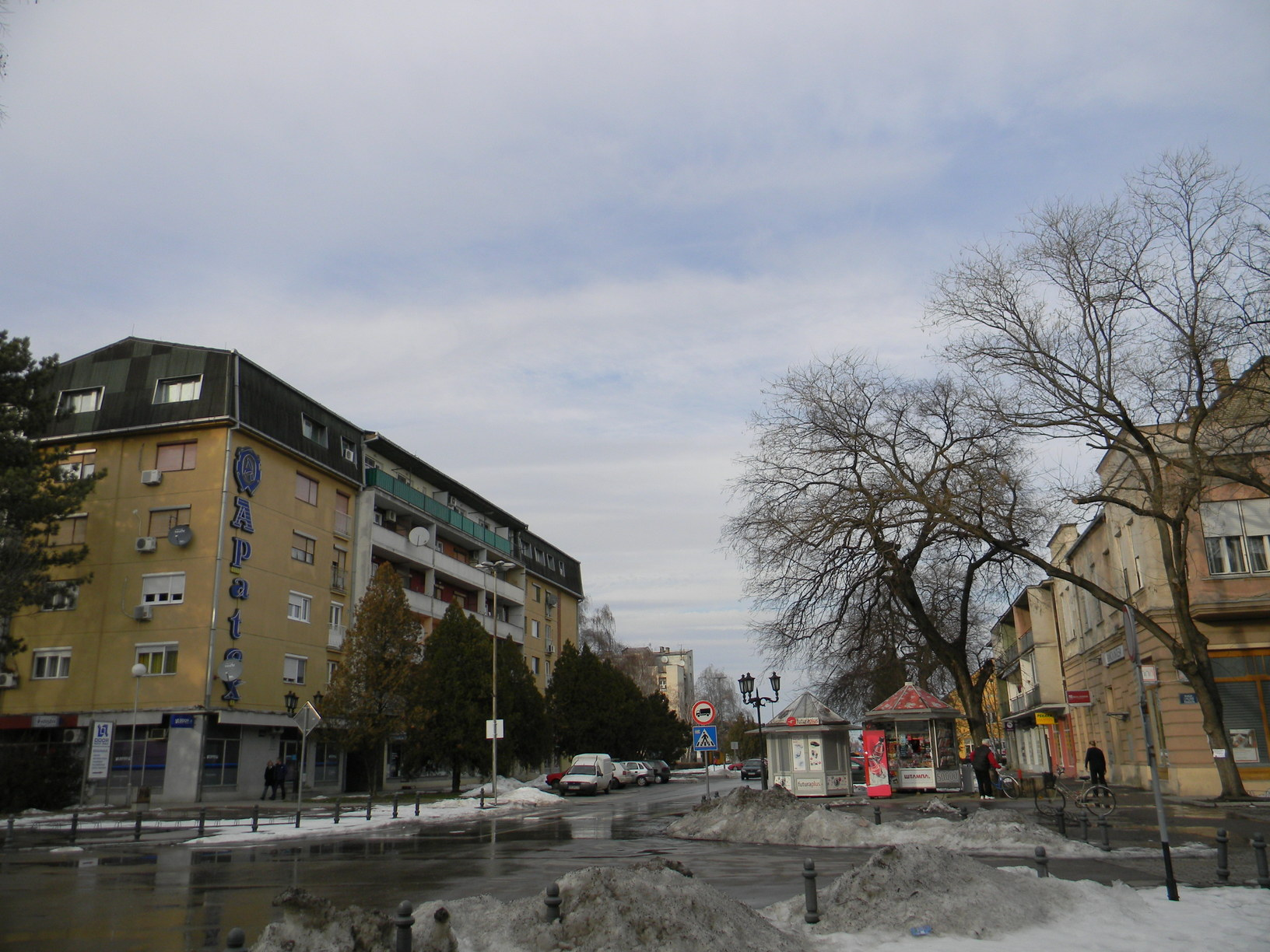
Apatin

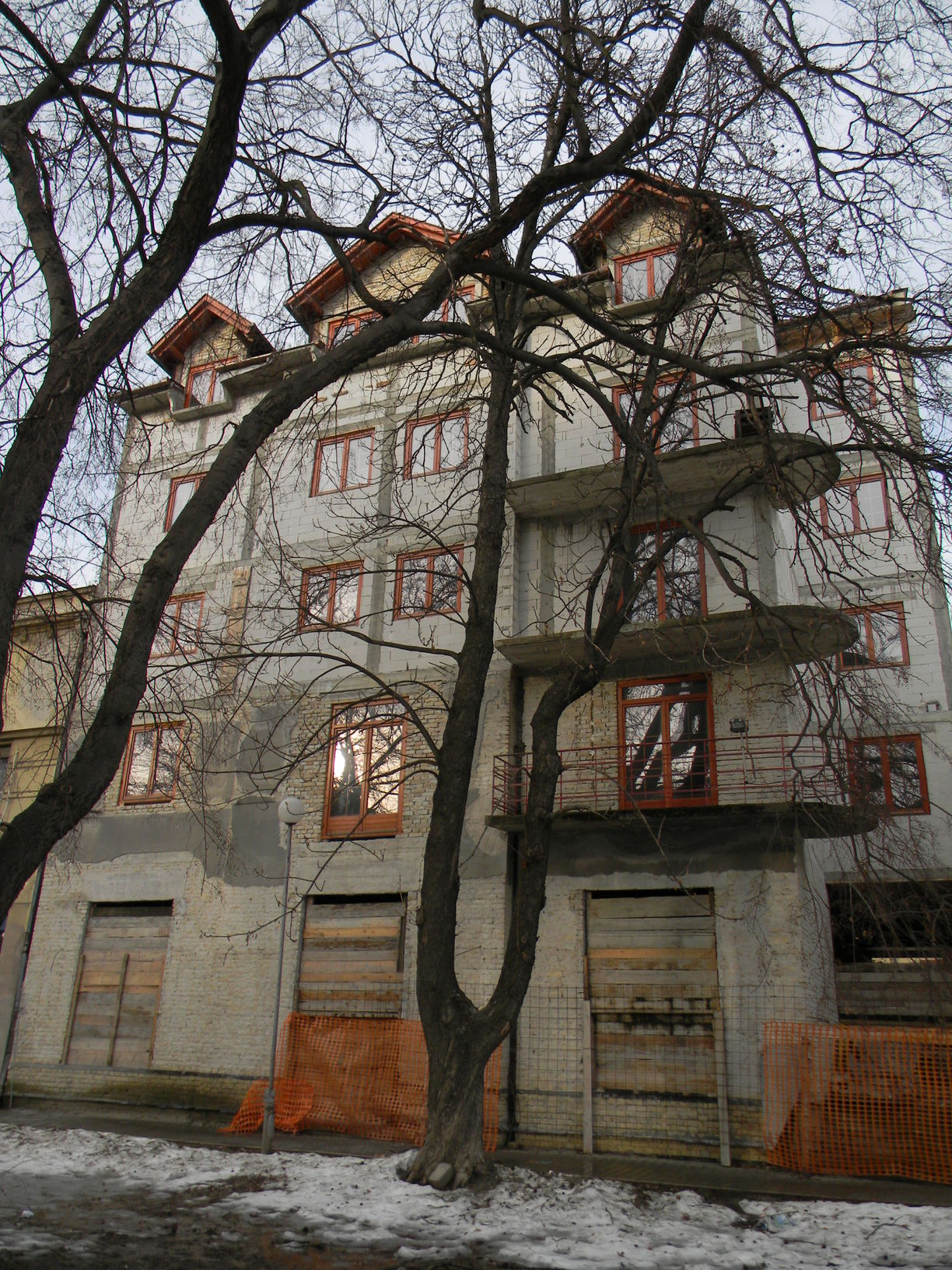
Apatin

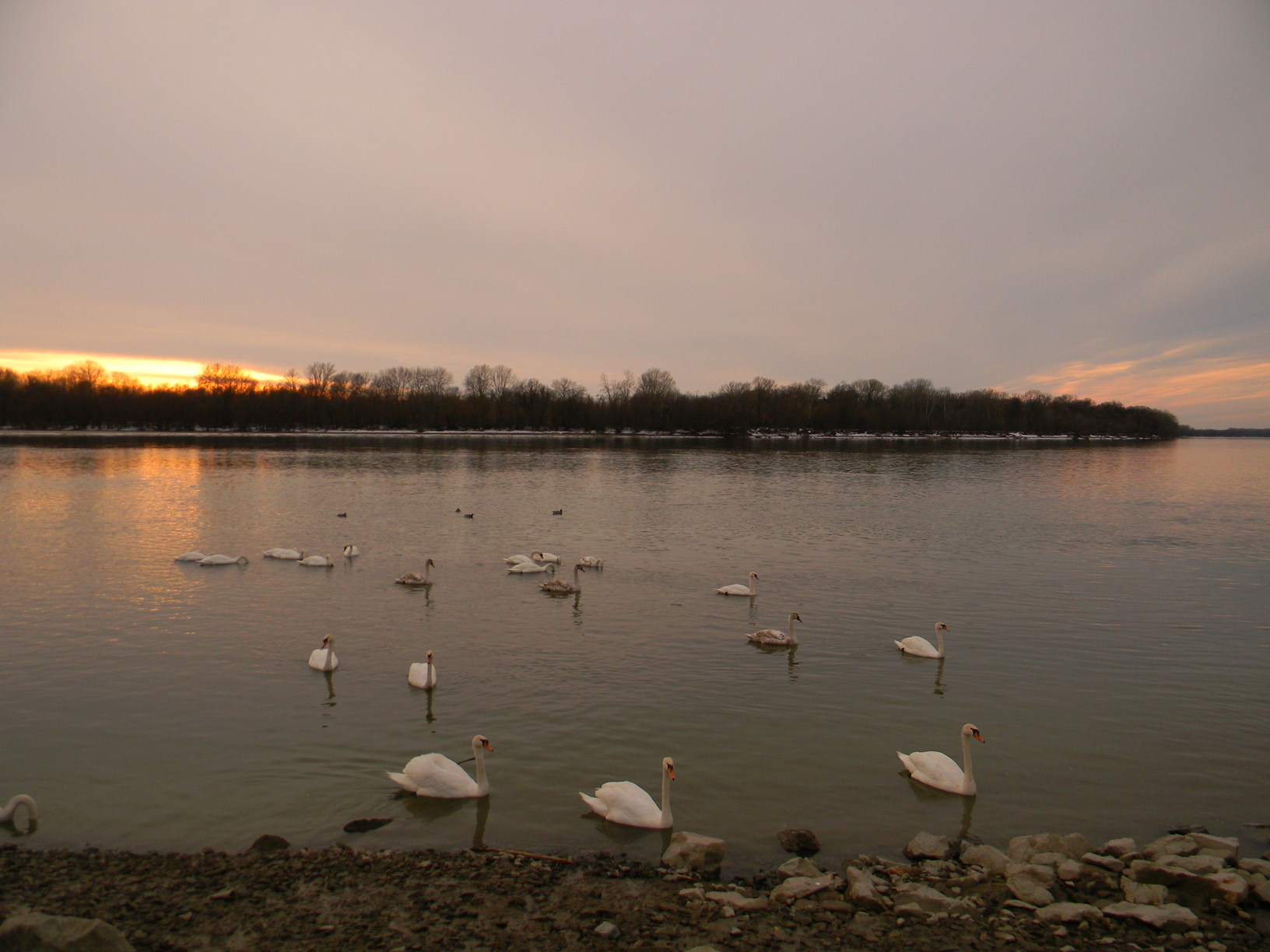
Apatin, Danube

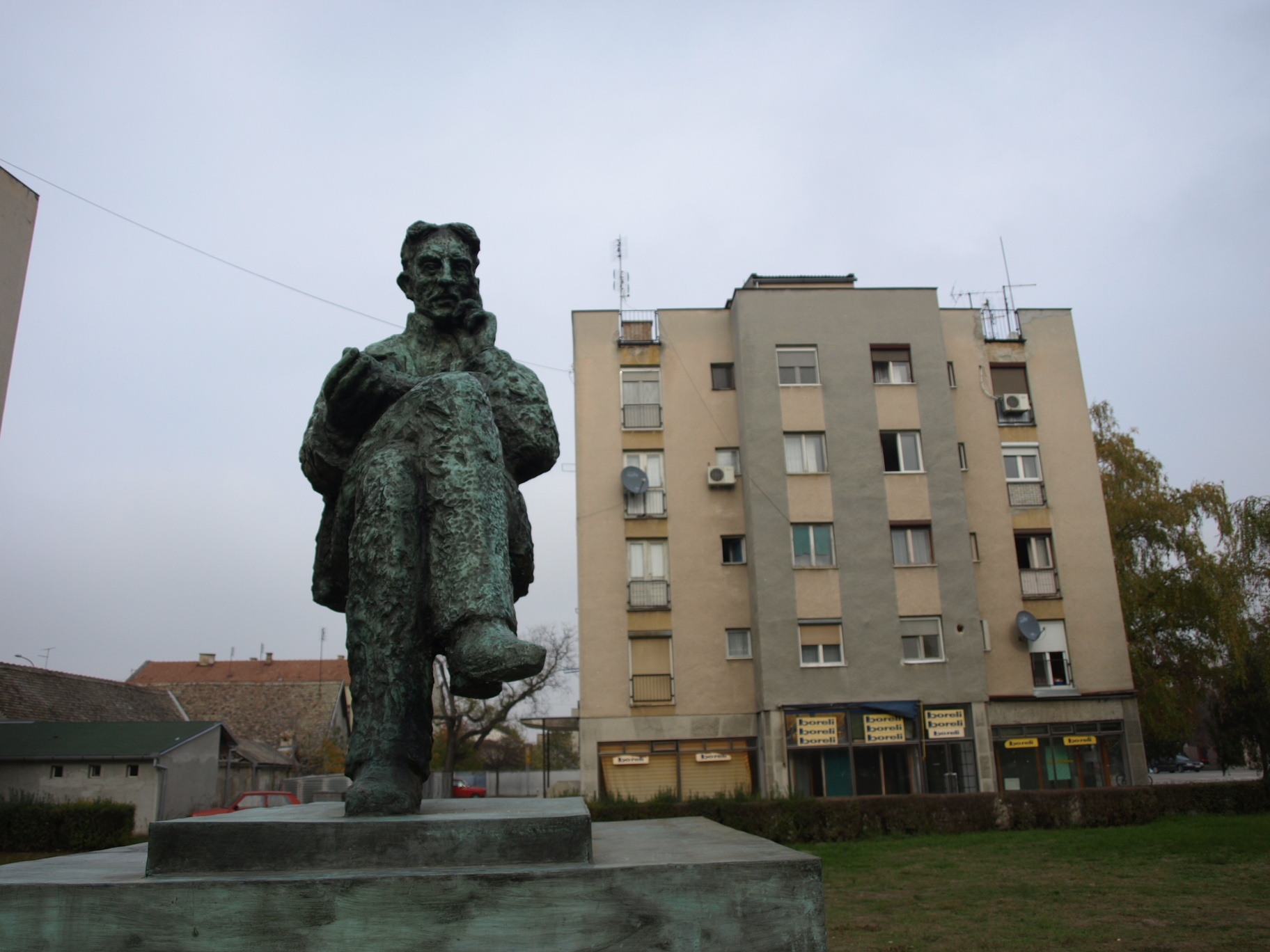
Apatin

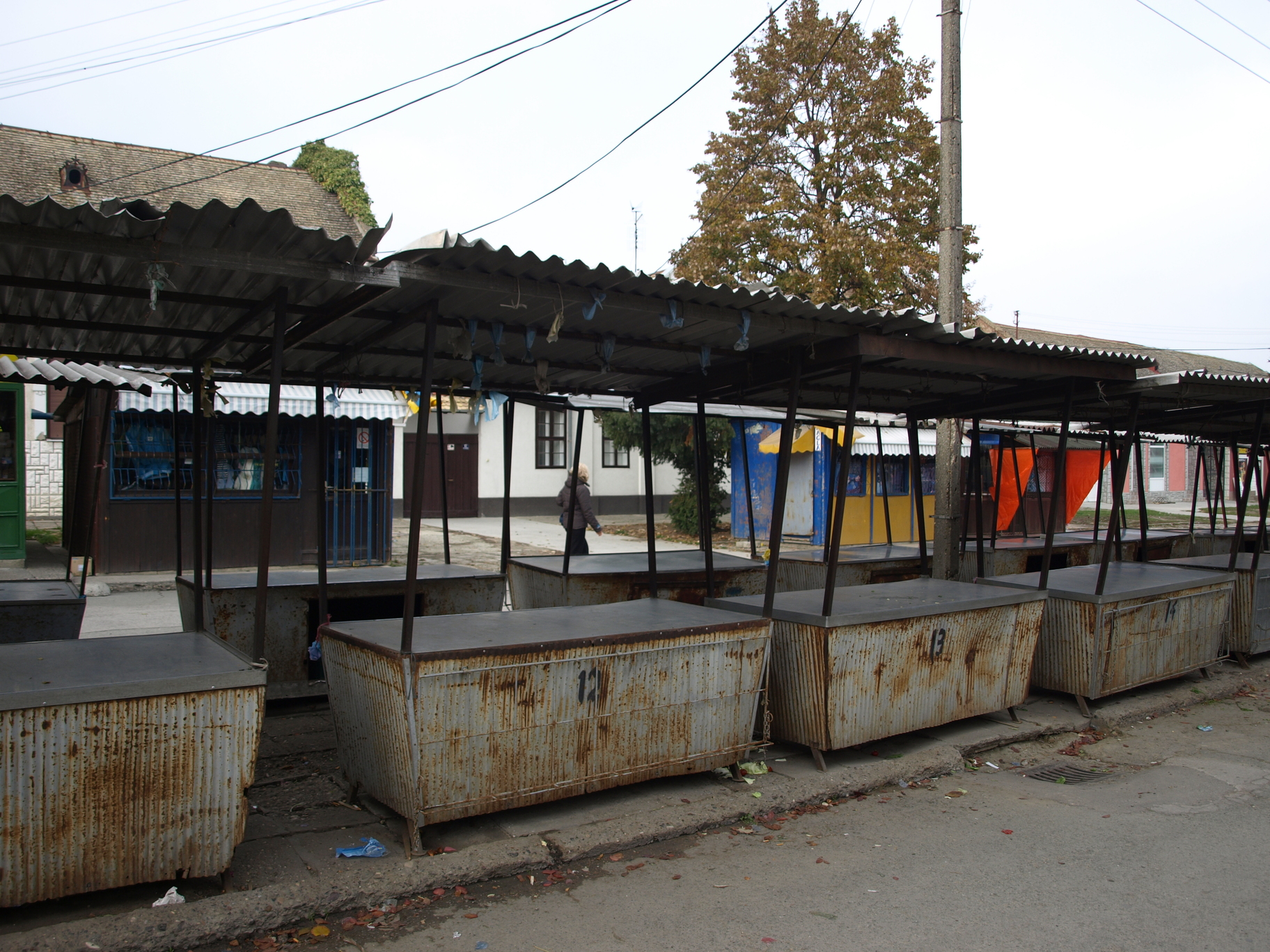
Apatin

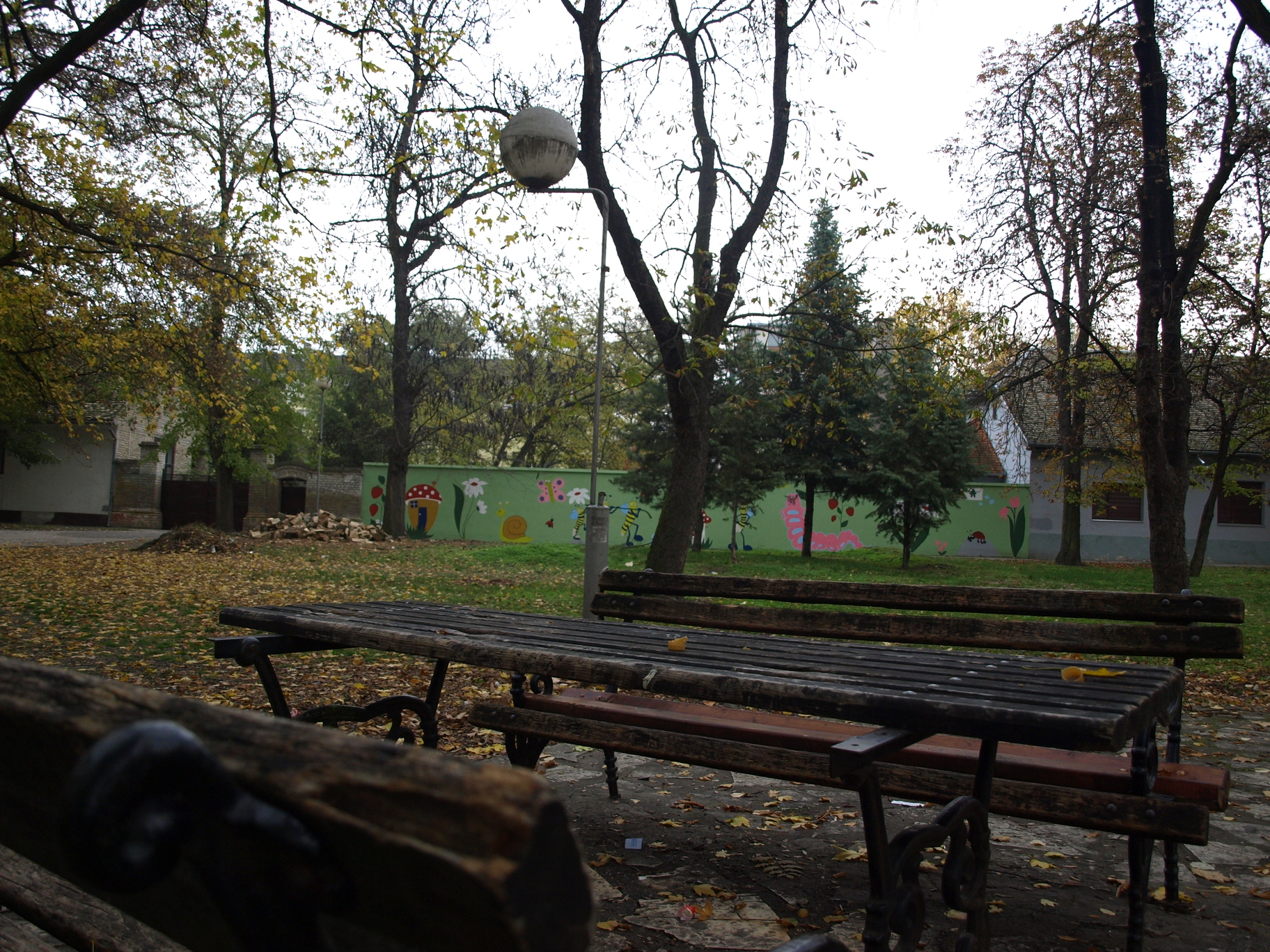
Apatin

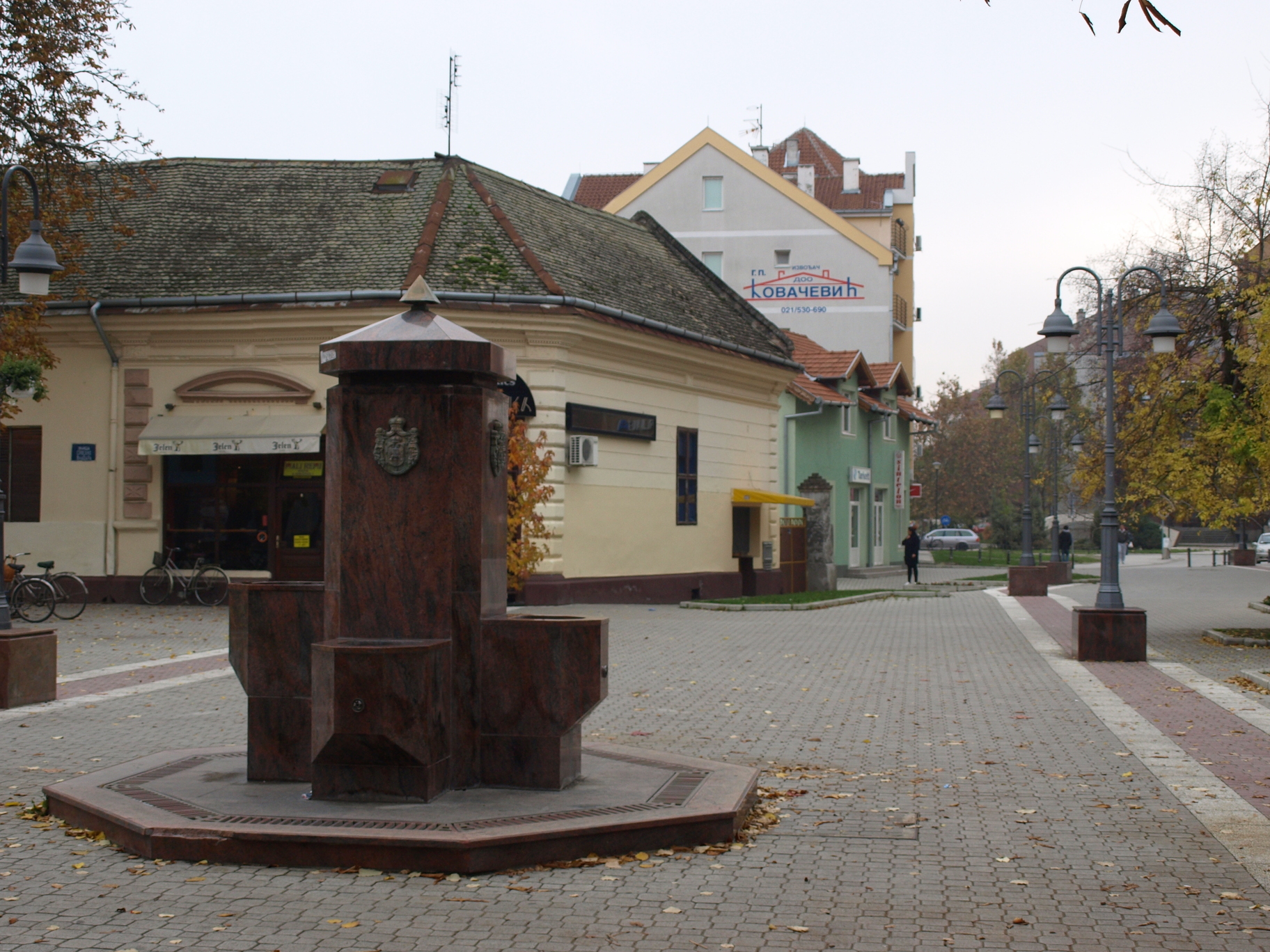
Apatin česma

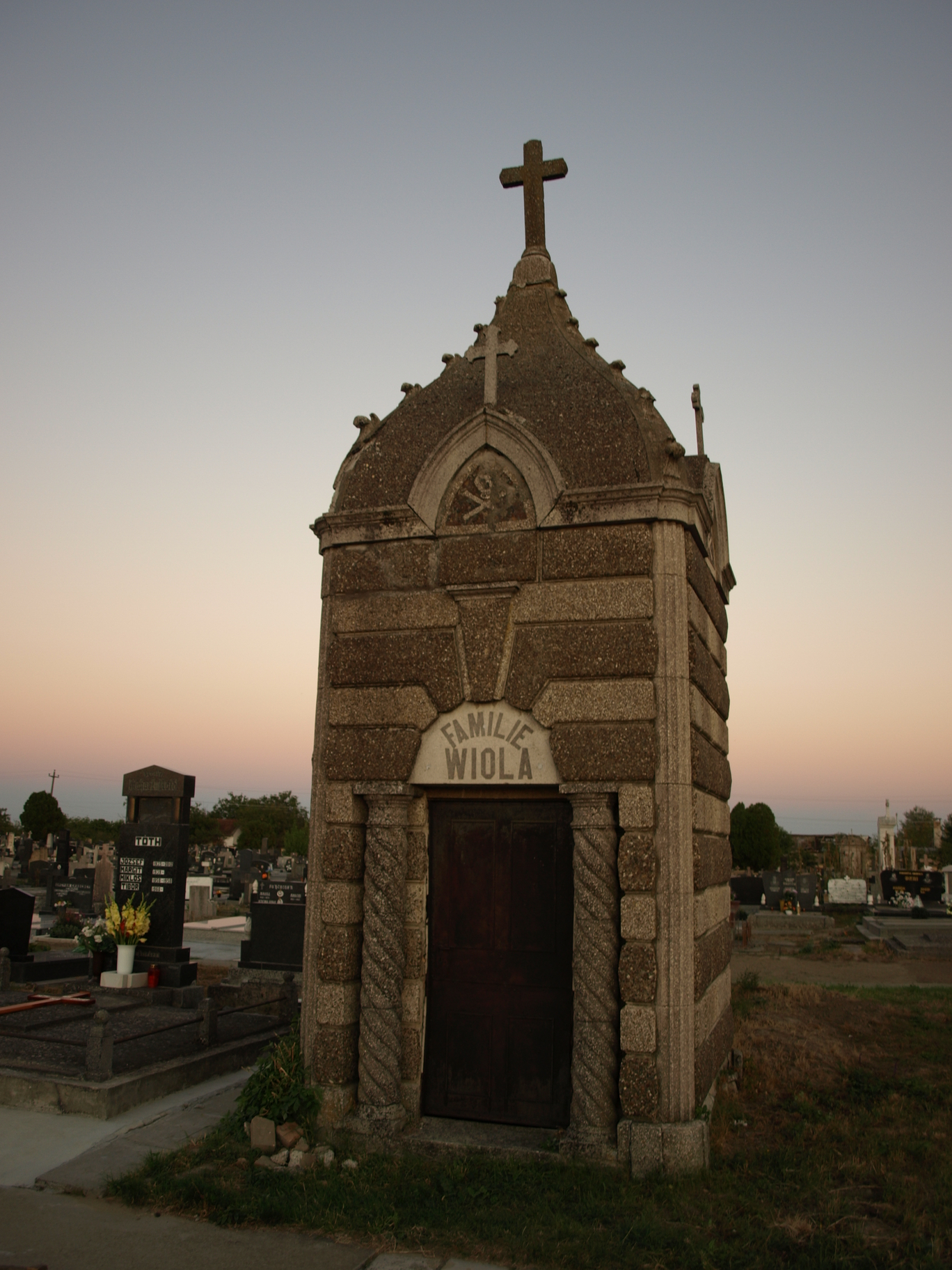
Apatin

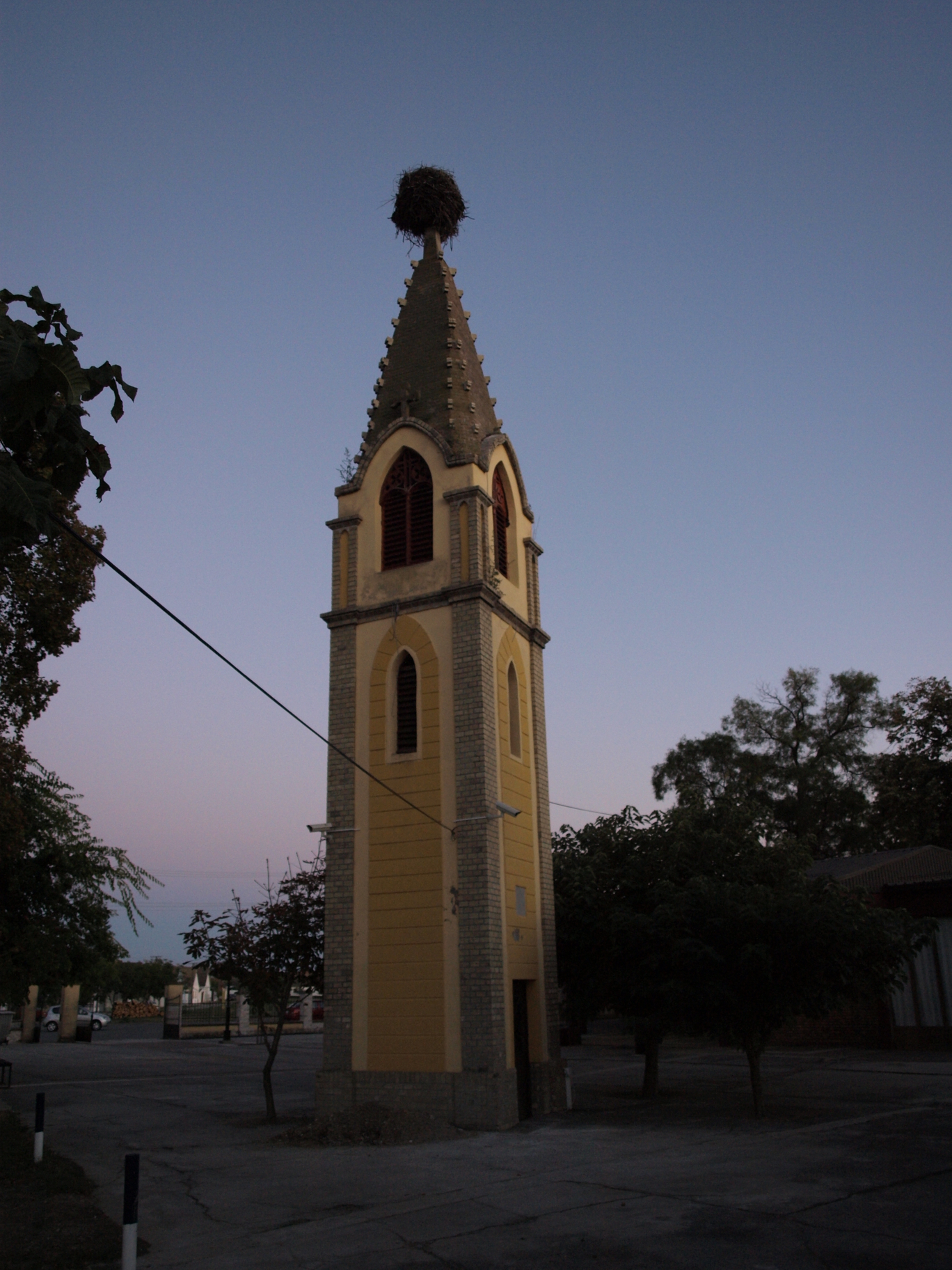
Apatin

== See also ==
- List of places in Serbia
- Municipalities of Serbia
- West Bačka District
