= Dragan Ivanović =

Serbian football manager and player

Personal information
- Date of birth: 2 December 1969 (age 56)
- Place of birth: Rumenka, SR Serbia, SFR Yugoslavia

Youth career
- Jedinstvo Rumenka

Senior career*
Years	Team	Apps	(Gls)
- Slavija Novi Sad

Managerial career
- 2006–2007: ČSK Čelarevo
- 2015–2016: ČSK Čelarevo
- 2016: Napredak Kruševac
- 2016–2017: Vojvodina
- 2017: Bačka
- 2018: Radnički Sremska Mitrovica
- 2018–2019: Hajduk 1912
- 2020: Napredak Kruševac
- 2021: Budućnost Dobanovci
- 2021: Rad
- 2021–2022: Tekstilac Odžaci
- 2024: Bečej
- 2025: Omladinac Novi Banovci
- 2026: Zvijezda 09
- * Club domestic league appearances and goals

Dragan Ivanović (Serbian Cyrillic: Драган Ивановић; born 2 December 1969) is a Serbian football manager and former player.

== Playing career ==
After starting out at Jedinstvo Rumenka, Ivanović played for Slavija Novi Sad and captained the team under manager Zvonko Ivezić. He also spent some time with Kabel.

== Managerial career ==
In the summer of 2006, Ivanović replaced Miroslav Vukašinović as manager of Serbian First League side ČSK Čelarevo. He spent one season in charge, narrowly missing out on the promotion playoffs. Over the next few years, Ivanović was mainly responsible for the development of the club's youth system, making himself a name for discovering and developing young talents, such as Aleksa Vukanović, Milan Pavkov, and Srđan Plavšić, among others.

In June 2016, Ivanović was appointed as manager of Serbian SuperLiga club Napredak Kruševac. He left the post in December to take charge of Vojvodina, signing a five-year contract. However, Ivanović was sacked by the club's board in April 2017.

In March 2018, Ivanović became manager of Serbian League Vojvodina club Radnički Sremska Mitrovica.

In December 2021, it was announced that Ivanović would take over as manager of Tekstilac Odžaci, thus returning to the Serbian League Vojvodina.

In January 2024, Ivanović took charge as manager of Bečej.

== Managerial statistics ==
Managerial record by team and tenure
Team	From	To	Record				
Team	From	To	P	W	D	L	Win %
Napredak Kruševac	June 2016	December 2016	22	10	7	5	45.45
Vojvodina	December 2016	April 2017	7	4	0	3	57.14
OFK Bačka	July 2017	August 2017	3	0	0	3	0.00
Napredak Kruševac	March 2020	September 2020	13	3	3	7	23.08
Total			45	17	10	18	37.78
