= Darko Baljak =

Serbian football manager and player

Personal information
- Full name: Darko Baljak
- Date of birth: 29 July 1983 (age 43)
- Place of birth: Sremska Mitrovica, SFR Yugoslavia
- Height: 1.90 m (6 ft 3 in)
- Position: Midfielder

Senior career*
Years	Team	Apps	(Gls)
2003–2007	Srem	114	(7)
2007–2009	Banat Zrenjanin	24	(3)
2009–2010	RFK Novi Sad	5	(0)
2010–2011	Banat Zrenjanin	9	(0)
2011	Srem	8	(0)
2012	Radnički Šid	27	(11)
2013	Fjölnir	0	(0)
2013	Sloga Erdevik		
2014	Radnički Sremska Mitrovica	12	(1)
Total		199	(22)

Managerial career
- 2016–2017: Radnički Sremska Mitrovica
- 2017: Radnički Sremska Mitrovica
- 2019–2022: Sloga Erdevik
- * Club domestic league appearances and goals

Darko Baljak (Serbian Cyrillic: Дарко Баљак; born 29 July 1983) is a Serbian football manager and former player.

== Playing career ==
After starting out at Srem, Baljak made his Serbian SuperLiga debut with Banat Zrenjanin in 2007. He also briefly played for Icelandic club Fjölnir in 2013, featuring in 1 cup game.

== Managerial career ==
Baljak started his managerial career at Radnički Sremska Mitrovica. He later served as manager of Sloga Erdevik between November 2019 and April 2022.
