= Nikola Stojanović (footballer, born 1983) =

Macedonian footballer

Personal information
- Full name: Nikola Stojanović
- Date of birth: 6 November 1983 (age 43)
- Place of birth: Skopje, SFR Yugoslavia
- Height: 1.85 m (6 ft 1 in)
- Position: Defender

Team information
- Current team: Radnik Surdulica (caretaker)

Senior career*
Years	Team	Apps	(Gls)
2001–2005	BSK Bujanovac		
2005–2011	Dinamo Vranje	71	(3)
2007–2008	→ Železničar Vranjska Banja (loan)		
2008	→ Radnik Surdulica (loan)		
2010	→ Radnik Surdulica (loan)		
2011–2016	Radnik Surdulica	100	(4)
2016–2018	Dinamo Vranje	3	(0)
2017–2018	→ BSK Bujanovac (loan)		
2018–	Levosoje		

Managerial career
- 2022-: Radnik Surdulica (caretaker)
- * Club domestic league appearances and goals as of 5 October 2018

Nikola Stojanović (Macedonian: Никола Стојановиќ, Serbian Cyrillic: Никола Стојановић; born 6 November 1983) is a former Macedonian football defender. He played on many positions in defense, or as a defensive midfielder.

== Club career ==
=== BSK Bujanovac ===
Born in Skopje, Stojanović started his career with BSK Bujanovac, where he had stayed until 2005, playing in the 3rd level leagues of Serbia.

=== Dinamo Vranje ===
After several seasons with team from Bujanovac, Stojanović moved to Dinamo Vranje for the 2005–06 season, and win that competition with new team at the end of season. For the 2006–07 season, in Serbian First League, Stojanović made 22 appearances and scored 2 goals, but his club was relegated to Serbian League East, again. He was loaned to Železničar Vranjska Banja for the 2007–08 season, but also as a member of Dinamo Vranje, which made new promotion to level up. Later he was loaned to Serbian League East club Radnik Surdulica for two times, in 2008, and 2010, but also made 31 appearances for Dinamo Vranje in Serbian First League in the meantime. After the 2010–11 Dinamo was relegated to Serbian League East, and Stojanović changed club.

=== Radnik Surdulica ===
Stojanović joined Radnik Surdulica for the 3rd time for the 2011–12 season, but this time as a single player. He made 24 appearances and scored 1 goal for the season. For the next season, he made 22 caps and also scored 1 goal, and Radnik Surdulica made promotion to Serbian First League after 2012–13 season. For 2013–14 season, Stojanović made 24 appearances, and scored 2 goals, against Sinđelić Beograd, and Metalac Gornji Milanovac. Captain of the team from Surdulica has been connected with transfer in Borac Čačak, after tournament "Vlasina 2014". However, he stayed with Radnik, but later he gave up the captain's armband to Miloš Krstić. For the 2014–15 season, Stojanović made 27 league, and 1 cup appearance, and was one of the most constant and most important players for the winning Serbian First league. Stojanović made his SuperLiga debut in the 7th fixture of 2015–16 season, against Radnički Niš, at the age of 31. After the end of 2015–16, Stojanović left the club.

=== Return to Dinamo Vranje ===
In summer 2016, Stojanović returned to Dinamo Vranje. After he played several matches at the beginning of the 2016–17 Serbian First League season, he missed the rest of season being with the team optionally as a player-coach. In the winter break off-season, Stojanović was related with KMF BSK. In summer 2017, Stojanović promoted as an assistant coach in Dinamo.

== Career statistics ==
=== Club ===
As of 2 July 2017

Club performance			League		Cup		Continental		Total	
Season	Club	League	Apps	Goals	Apps	Goals	Apps	Goals	Apps	Goals
2006–07	Dinamo Vranje	First League	22	2	—		—		22	2
2008–09	Dinamo Vranje	First League	13	0	—		—		13	0
2009–10	Dinamo Vranje	First League	18	0	—		—		18	0
2010–11	Dinamo Vranje	First League	18	1	—		—		18	1
2011–12	Radnik Surdulica	League East	24	1	—		—		24	1
2012–13	Radnik Surdulica	League East	22	1	—		—		22	1
2013–14	Radnik Surdulica	First League	24	2	—		—		24	2
2014–15	Radnik Surdulica	First League	27	0	1	0	—		28	0
2015–16	Radnik Surdulica	SuperLiga	3	0	1	0	—		4	0
2016–17	Dinamo Vranje	First League	3	0	0	0	—		3	0
Career total			174	7	2	0	0	0	177	7

== Honours ==
Dinamo Vranje

- Serbian League East (2): 2005–06, 2007–08

Radnik Surdulica

- Serbian League East: 2012–13
- Serbian First League: 2014–15
