= 2007–08 Serbian League Belgrade =

Serbian League Belgrade
- Season: 2007–08
- Champions: Kolubara
- Promoted: Kolubara
- Relegated: Obilić; Posavac; Lokomotiva Beograd
- Top goalscorer: Dragan Dobrić

The 2007–08 Serbian League Belgrade was the fourth season of the league under its current title. It began in August 2007 and ended in June 2008.

== League table ==
Pos	Team	Pld	W	D	L	GF	GA	GD	Pts	Promotion or relegation
1	Kolubara (C, P)	30	18	7	5	40	18	+22	61	Promotion to Serbian First League
2	Radnički Obrenovac	30	16	9	5	42	26	+16	57	Qualification for promotion play-offs
3	Beograd	30	13	10	7	36	22	+14	49	
4	Teleoptik	30	13	10	7	41	18	+23	49	
5	Palilulac Beograd	30	13	6	11	45	44	+1	45	
6	Srem Jakovo	30	13	5	12	32	31	+1	44	
7	Sopot	30	11	11	8	37	33	+4	44	
8	Radnički Beograd	30	12	6	12	37	37	0	42	
9	Šumadija Jagnjilo	30	9	14	7	34	26	+8	41	
10	Dorćol	30	11	6	13	40	38	+2	39	
11	Sinđelić Beograd	30	11	5	14	36	40	−4	38	
12	Železničar Beograd	30	9	11	10	30	31	−1	38	
13	BASK (Note: 3 points deducted)	30	10	8	12	28	38	−10	35	
14	Lokomotiva Beograd (R)	30	9	8	13	39	46	−7	32	Relegation to the Belgrade Zone League
15	Posavac (R)	30	7	6	17	27	44	−17	27	Relegation to the Belgrade Zone League
16	Obilić (R)	30	2	4	24	15	67	−52	10	Relegation to the Belgrade Zone League

Source: srbijasport.net
Rules for classification: 1) points; 2) goal difference; 3) number of goals scored.
(C) Champions; (P) Promoted; (R) Relegated

== Playoffs ==
First round
2 (III W)	Sloga Kraljevo	2
2 (III E)	Sinđelić Niš	1
2 (III B)	Radnički Obrenovac	0 (2)
2 (III V)	Inđija (p)	0 (4)

Second round
2 (III W)	Sloga Kraljevo	0
2 (III V)	Inđija	2

Finals
2 (III V)	Inđija	2 1 3
14 (II)	Radnički Niš	0 1 1
