= Bratislav Pejčić =

Serbian footballer

Personal information
- Date of birth: 17 January 1983 (age 43)
- Place of birth: Vlasotince, SFR Yugoslavia
- Height: 1.84 m (6 ft 0 in)
- Position: Defensive midfielder

Youth career
- Budućnost Banatski Dvor

Senior career*
Years	Team	Apps	(Gls)
2000–2004	Budućnost Banatski Dvor	7	(0)
2004–2007	Vlasina	100	(6)
2007–2010	Mladi Radnik	42	(1)
2010–2014	Radnički Niš	64	(6)
2014–2021	Radnik Surdulica	132	(1)
Total		345	(14)
- * Club domestic league appearances and goals

Bratislav Pejčić (Serbian Cyrillic: Братислав Пејчић, born 17 January 1983) is a Serbian retired footballer. He played in a midfielder position.

== Career ==
=== Early career ===
He started his career in FK Budućnost Banatski Dvor, who is now known as FK Banat Zrenjanin, with whom he spent about three and a half seasons. He then moved to FK Vlasina Vlasotince, who he played with for two and a half seasons, playing 100 times, and scoring six goals in the league. He also helped the new Second League members get to the Serbia and Montenegro Cup quarter-finals in 2004–05 season and to maintain their second tier (Second League of Serbia and Montenegro, later became Serbian First League) status in 2005, 2006 and 2007.

He then moved to Serbian League West, in a Serbian third tier outfit, FK Mladi Radnik Požarevac, and earned them a promotion to Serbian First League right away in the 2007–08 season. In the debut season in the Serbian First League in 2008–09, FK Mladi Radnik Požarevac achieved a third place and another consecutive promotion, this time to the highest rank, Serbian SuperLiga but it came out to be a short trip as they ended up in the last place in 2009–10 Serbian SuperLiga.

Meanwhile, in mid-season Pejčić joined FK Radnički Niš who also managed to get relegated, but from Serbian First League to Serbian League East. Pejčić managed to put in 14 appearances and scored one goal in that second half of the season, and even though Radnički Niš lost only one game in the spring under coach Aleksandar Ilić, they still got relegated due to the poor start in the first half of the season.

=== FK Radnički Niš ===
==== 2010–11 ====
Pejčić remained with FK Radnički Niš as the club competed in the 2010–11 Serbian League East. FK Radnički Niš won the third-tier division and secured promotion.

==== 2011–12 ====
The 2011–12 season proved more successful for Pejčić. 2011–12 Serbian First League got conquered, even with three coaching changes, the last one happened to be Aleksandar Ilić again, and even though the financial troubles started to mount within the club, not for once did the FK Radnički Niš players let someone take over the first spot. Pejčić put in another great season, this time appearing 20 times and scoring three goals. After nine long seasons, southern Serbian giant has come back, and Pejčić's loyalty did not get forgotten.

==== 2012–13 ====
The manager, Aleksandar Ilić, made numerous changes in the squad, as he finally had an opportunity to create the team himself, and not improvise with a sinking ship like he did before. Only select few got the opportunity to stay, as the manager made up a completely new team for the comeback 2012–13 Serbian SuperLiga season.

Pejčić was named captain of FK Radnički Niš. In the 2012-13 season, Pejčić made 26 appearances in the league, scoring 2 goals. He also played the entire 90 minutes of the 1/16 Serbian Cup clash with the Belgrade giants Red Star.

==== 2013-14 ====
Pejčić made just 4 league appearances for FK Radnički Niš during the 2013-14 season, scoring 0 goals.

=== FK Radnik Surdulica ===
Pejčić signed for Surdulica in 2014. In 5 years at the club, he has made over 100 appearances, scoring 1 goal in the league.

== Honours ==
Radnik Surdulica

- Serbian First League: 2014–15
- Serbian First League
  - Winner (1): 2012
  - 3rd Place (1): 2009
- Serbian League West
  - Winner (1): 2008
- Serbian League East
  - Winner (1): 2011
