= Stefan Stojanović (footballer, born 1997) =

Serbian footballer

Personal information
- Date of birth: 9 February 1997 (age 29)
- Place of birth: Pertate, FR Yugoslavia
- Height: 1.89 m (6 ft 2 1/2 in)
- Position: Goalkeeper

Team information
- Current team: Chania
- Number: 97

Youth career
- Sloga Leskovac
- 2013–2016: Napredak Kruševac

Senior career*
Years	Team	Apps	(Gls)
2013–2016	Napredak Kruševac	1	(0)
2016	→ Temnić (loan)	12	(0)
2016	→ Radnički Obrenovac (loan)	11	(0)
2017–2018	Jagodina	16	(0)
2018–2020	Trayal	43	(0)
2020	Radnički Pirot	1	(0)
2020–2024	Levadiakos	49	(0)
2024–2025	Panachaiki	16	(0)
2025–	Chania	25	(0)

International career
2012–2014	Serbia U17		
2015	Serbia U18	1	(0)
- * Club domestic league appearances and goals as of 21 April 2026

Stefan Stojanović (Serbian Cyrillic: Стефан Стојановић; born 9 February 1997) is a Serbian professional footballer who plays as a goalkeeper for Greek Super League 2 club Chania.

== Career ==
=== Napredak Kruševac ===
As a goalkeeper of Sloga Leskovac cadet team and a member of Serbia U17 national team, Stojanović joined Napredak Kruševac in summer 2013, signing a contract on 8 August same year. He spent 3 seasons with club youth categories, but was also licensed for the first team as a third choice. During the spring half of 2015–16, Stojanović was loaned to Temnić, where he played mostly matches in the Serbian League East, and also won the cup of Rasina District. He made his debut for the first team of Napredak Kruševac in the last fixture of the 2015–16 Serbian First League season. In summer 2016, Stojanović moved on six-month loan to Radnički Obrenovac. At the beginning of 2017, Stojanović terminated the contract with Napredak and left club as a free agent.

== Career statistics ==
As of 8 April 2017

Club	Season	League			Cup		Continental		Other		Total	
Club	Season	Division	Apps	Goals	Apps	Goals	Apps	Goals	Apps	Goals	Apps	Goals
Napredak Kruševac	2013–14	Serbian SuperLiga	0	0	0	0	—		—		0	0
Napredak Kruševac	2014–15	Serbian SuperLiga	0	0	0	0	—		0	0	0	0
Napredak Kruševac	2015–16	Serbian First League	1	0	0	0	—		—		1	0
Napredak Kruševac	2016–17	Serbian SuperLiga	0	0	0	0	—		—		0	0
Napredak Kruševac	Total		1	0	0	0	—		0	0	1	0
Temnić (loan)	2015–16	Serbian League East	12	0	—		—		2 (Note: Appearances in Rasina District Cup)	0	14	0
Radnički Obrenovac (loan)	2016–17	Serbian League Belgrade	11	0	—		—		1 (Note: Appearance in Belgrade Cup)	0	12	0
Jagodina	2016–17	Serbian First League	2	0	—		—		—		2	0
Jagodina	2017–18	Serbian First League	7	0	—		—		—		7	0
Jagodina	Total		9	0	—		—		—		9	0
Career total			33	0	0	0	—		3	0	36	0

== Honours ==
Napredak Kruševac

- Serbian First League: 2015–16

Levadiakos

- Super League 2: 2021–22
