= Miloš Josimov =

Serbian footballer

Personal information
- Date of birth: 27 September 1984 (age 42)
- Place of birth: Ruma, SFR Yugoslavia
- Height: 1.84 m (6 ft 0 in)
- Position: Left-back

Youth career
- 2002–2003: Radnički Beograd

Senior career*
Years	Team	Apps	(Gls)
2003–2004	Beograd	15	(4)
2004–2005	Morava Ćuprija		
2005–2006	Radnički Pirot	25	(3)
2006–2007	Železničar Beograd	27	(3)
2007–2008	Sloven Ruma	27	(0)
2008–2009	Donji Srem	14	(2)
2010	Novi Sad	29	(1)
2011–2013	Donji Srem	72	(5)
2013–2014	Slovan Bratislava	17	(0)
2014	→ Slovan Bratislava II	1	(0)
2015	Donji Srem	13	(0)
2015–2016	Radnički Sremska Mitrovica	26	(7)
2016	Bačka Palanka	14	(0)
2017–2019	KPV	70	(13)
2020–2021	PEPO Lappeenranta	22	(6)
2021–2022	Radnički Sremska Mitrovica	15	(0)
- * Club domestic league appearances and goals as of 10 October 2021

Miloš Josimov (Serbian Cyrillic: Милош Јосимов; born 27 September 1984) is a Serbian retired footballer who played as a defender.

== Career ==
In the early stages of his career, Josimov represented numerous lower league clubs, including Beograd, Morava Ćuprija, Radnički Pirot, Železničar Beograd, and Sloven Ruma. He spent his most successful years at Donji Srem, winning promotion to the Serbian SuperLiga in 2012. Due to his performances, Josimov was named in the competition's 2012–13 Team of the Season.

In June 2013, Josimov moved abroad and signed with Slovak club Slovan Bratislava, a two-year contract with an extension option. He made his competitive debut in a 1–1 league draw at home to Dunajská Streda on 12 July. Slovan won the championship with Josimov featuring in 16 out of 33 matches. In the summer of 2014, Josimov was demoted to the reserves.

In 2017, Josimov moved to Finland and joined Ykkönen side KPV, helping them win promotion to the top flight in 2018.

== Honours ==
=== Club ===
Donji Srem

- Serbian League Vojvodina: 2010–11

Slovan Bratislava

- Slovak Super Liga: 2013–14

=== Individual ===
- Serbian SuperLiga Team of the Season: 2012–13
