= 2007–08 Serbian League East =

Serbian League East
- Season: 2007–08
- Champions: Dinamo Vranje
- Promoted: Dinamo Vranje
- Relegated: OFK Niš; Rudar Aleksinac; Ozren Sokobanja; Sloga Leskovac; Trayal; Morava Vladičin Han
- Top goalscorer: Novica Lazarević

The 2007–08 Serbian League East season was the fifth season of the league under its current title. It began in August 2007 and ended in May 2008.

== League table ==
Pos	Team	Pld	W	D	L	GF	GA	GD	Pts	Promotion or relegation
1	Dinamo Vranje (C, P)	30	19	8	3	57	21	+36	65	Promotion to the Serbian First League
2	Sinđelić Niš	30	18	8	4	64	25	+39	62	Qualification for promotion play-offs
3	Dubočica	30	18	7	5	59	19	+40	61	
4	Svrljig	30	17	4	9	49	28	+21	55	
5	Kopaonik (Note: 1 point deducted)	30	15	9	6	45	27	+18	53	
6	Timok	30	12	7	11	45	36	+9	43	
7	Balkanski	30	12	7	11	34	44	−10	43	
8	Železničar Vranjska Banja	30	12	6	12	44	38	+6	42	
9	Župa	30	11	8	11	38	37	+1	41	
10	Železničar Niš	30	12	5	13	38	38	0	41	
11	Morava Vladičin Han (R)	30	12	5	13	42	43	−1	41	Relegation to Zone League
12	Trayal (R)	30	11	5	14	34	46	−12	38	Relegation to Zone League
13	Sloga Leskovac (R)	30	10	3	17	30	44	−14	33	Relegation to Zone League
14	Ozren Sokobanja (R)	30	7	5	18	22	49	−27	26	Relegation to Zone League
15	Rudar Aleksinac (R)	30	4	4	22	29	86	−57	16	Relegation to Zone League
16	OFK Niš (R)	30	3	3	24	21	70	−49	12	Relegation to Zone League

Source: srbijasport.net
Rules for classification: 1) points; 2) goal difference; 3) number of goals scored.
(C) Champions; (P) Promoted; (R) Relegated

== Playoffs ==
First round
2 (III W)	Sloga Kraljevo	2
2 (III E)	Sinđelić Niš	1
2 (III B)	Radnički Obrenovac	0 (2)
2 (III V)	Inđija (p)	0 (4)

Second round
2 (III W)	Sloga Kraljevo	0
2 (III V)	Inđija	2

Finals
2 (III V)	Inđija	2 1 3
14 (II)	Radnički Niš	0 1 1
