= 2000–01 Second League of FR Yugoslavia =

Second League of FR Yugoslavia 2000–01 (Serbian: Druga liga Jugoslavije) consisted of three groups of 18 teams (Serbia) and 1 group of 12 teams (Montenegro).

== League table ==
=== North ===
Pos	Team	Pld	W	D	L	GF	GA	GD	Pts	Promotion or relegation
1	Mladost Apatin (C, P)	34	24	5	5	65	27	+38	77	Promotion to First League of FR Yugoslavia
2	Proleter Zrenjanin	34	23	7	4	66	26	+40	76	
3	Radnički Beograd	34	19	7	8	58	25	+33	64	
4	Novi Sad	34	18	8	8	56	38	+18	62	
5	Teleoptik	34	19	4	11	59	34	+25	61	
6	Budućnost Banatski Dvor	34	15	10	9	53	47	+6	55	
7	Vrbas	34	16	3	15	46	43	+3	51	
8	Spartak Subotica	34	13	8	13	54	36	+18	47	
9	ČSK	34	13	5	16	56	57	−1	44	
10	Bežanija	34	13	4	17	45	58	−13	43	
11	Železničar Beograd	34	12	6	16	48	44	+4	42	
12	Dinamo Pančevo	34	12	6	16	34	47	−13	42	
13	Kabel	34	12	5	17	37	46	−9	41	
14	Big Bull Bačinci	34	10	7	17	44	63	−19	37	
15	Bečej	34	10	6	18	47	65	−18	36	
16	Cement Beočin (R)	34	7	11	16	25	50	−25	32	Relegation to Serbian League (Note: One team from 1st league allocated to North Group, so three teams relegated, later FK Milicionar withdrew from league systems, one more team was promoted)
17	Mladost Lukićevo (R)	34	9	5	20	34	64	−30	32	Relegation to Serbian League
18	IM Rakovica (R)	34	4	7	23	26	83	−57	19	Relegation to Serbian League

Source: rsssf.org
Rules for classification: 1) points; 2) goal difference; 3) number of goals scored.
(C) Champions; (P) Promoted; (R) Relegated

=== East ===
Pos	Team	Pld	W	D	L	GF	GA	GD	Pts	Promotion or relegation
1	Zvezdara (C, P)	34	29	3	2	97	20	+77	90	Promotion to First League of FR Yugoslavia
2	Hajduk Beograd	34	28	2	4	93	26	+67	86	
3	Dubočica	34	20	4	10	59	44	+15	64	
4	OFK Niš	34	20	3	11	67	38	+29	63	
5	Jedinstvo Paraćin	34	16	7	11	56	39	+17	55	
6	Napredak Kušiljevo	34	16	6	12	54	41	+13	54	
7	Beograd	34	16	5	13	83	60	+23	53	
8	BSK Borča	34	16	4	14	53	49	+4	52	
9	Železničar Niš	34	15	4	15	62	52	+10	49	
10	Mladi Radnik	34	13	9	12	44	44	0	48	
11	Žitorađa	34	14	5	15	43	47	−4	47	
12	Radnički Svilajnac	34	15	2	17	39	48	−9	47	
13	Trayal Kruševac	34	11	5	18	48	78	−30	38	
14	Vučje	34	10	4	20	37	69	−32	34	
15	Rudar Aleksinac (R)	34	9	5	20	57	83	−26	32	Relegation to Serbian League (Note: 2 team from 1st league allocated to East Group, so four teams relegated)
16	Bor (R)	34	9	3	22	24	66	−42	30	Relegation to Serbian League
17	Rudar Kostolac (R)	34	8	3	23	38	77	−39	27	Relegation to Serbian League
18	Temnić 1924 (R)	34	2	4	28	15	88	−73	10	Relegation to Serbian League

Source: rsssf.org
Rules for classification: 1) points; 2) goal difference; 3) number of goals scored.
(C) Champions; (P) Promoted; (R) Relegated

=== West ===
Pos	Team	Pld	W	D	L	GF	GA	GD	Pts	Promotion or relegation
1	Mladost Lučani (C, P)	34	24	6	4	81	27	+54	78	Promotion to First League of FR Yugoslavia
2	Borac Čačak	34	23	3	8	71	24	+47	72	
3	Železničar Lajkovac	34	18	6	10	48	32	+16	60	
4	Bane	34	19	2	13	57	50	+7	59	
5	Kolubara	34	14	11	9	45	38	+7	53	
6	Javor Ivanjica	34	15	8	11	40	33	+7	53	
7	Novi Pazar	34	11	11	12	42	45	−3	44	
8	Jedinstvo Ub	34	12	8	14	42	46	−4	44	
9	Šumadija 1903	34	13	4	17	36	39	−3	43	
10	Loznica	34	13	4	17	44	54	−10	43	
11	Zastava Kragujevac	34	12	6	16	47	61	−14	42	
12	Sloga Lipnički Šor	34	13	3	18	34	48	−14	42	
13	Sloga Kraljevo	34	12	4	18	51	70	−19	40	
14	Sloboda Užice	34	10	9	15	37	45	−8	39	
15	GP Zlatibor Užice	34	11	6	17	39	51	−12	39	
16	ZSK Valjevo	34	9	11	14	35	48	−13	38 (Note: Head-to-head record: ZSK Valjevo – Budućnost Valjevo 1–1, Budućnost Valjevo – ZSK Valjevo 1–2.)	
17	Budućnost Valjevo (R)	34	10	8	16	39	50	−11	38	Relegation to Serbian League (Note: no team from 1st league allocated to West Group, so two teams relegated)
18	Metalac Gornji Milanovac (R)	34	9	6	19	39	66	−27	33	Relegation to Serbian League

Source: rsssf.org
Rules for classification: 1) points; 2) goal difference; 3) number of goals scored.
(C) Champions; (P) Promoted; (R) Relegated

=== South (Montenegro) ===
Pos	Team	Pld	W	D	L	GF	GA	GD	Pts	Promotion or relegation
1	Rudar Pljevlja (C, P)	33	25	5	3	90	17	+73	80	Promotion to First League of FR Yugoslavia
2	Bokelj	33	23	7	3	62	21	+41	76	
3	Mogren	33	20	5	8	53	33	+20	65	
4	Mladost Podgorica	33	15	10	8	56	29	+27	55	
5	Čelik Nikšić	33	15	2	16	53	50	+3	47	
6	Iskra Danilovgrad	33	13	2	18	58	59	−1	41	
7	Zabjelo	33	11	5	17	39	54	−15	38	
8	Lovćen	33	9	7	17	42	63	−21	34	
9	Jedinstvo Bijelo Polje	33	9	6	18	38	48	−10	33	
10	Ibar	33	9	5	19	29	74	−45	32	
11	Grbalj (R)	33	7	9	17	28	49	−21	30	Relegation to Montenegrin League
12	Berane (R)	33	7	7	19	26	77	−51	28	Relegation to Montenegrin League

Source: rsssf.org
Rules for classification: 1) points; 2) goal difference; 3) number of goals scored.
(C) Champions; (P) Promoted; (R) Relegated
