= Dušan Mladenović (footballer, born 1995) =

Serbian footballer

Personal information
- Full name: Dušan Mladenović
- Date of birth: 18 September 1995 (age 31)
- Place of birth: Leskovac, FR Yugoslavia
- Height: 1.75 m (5 ft 9 in)
- Position: Left wing-back

Team information
- Current team: ATSV Salzburg
- Number: 10

Youth career
- Sloga Leskovac
- Moravac Mrštane

Senior career*
Years	Team	Apps	(Gls)
2012–2015	Moravac Mrštane	29	(0)
2014–2015	→ Ozren Sokobanja (loan)	10	(2)
2015	Jedinstvo Bošnjace	13	(2)
2016	Tabane Trgovački	14	(4)
2016	Sileks	8	(1)
2017	Dinamo Vranje	2	(0)
2017–2018	Jedinstvo Paraćin		
2018	FavAC	12	(0)
2019–2020	Jagodina		
2020–2023	Dubočica	20+	(0)
2024-	ATSV Salzburg	23	(2)
- * Club domestic league appearances and goals as of 10 January 2025

Dušan Mladenović (Serbian Cyrillic: Душан Младеновић; born 18 September 1995) is a Serbian footballer, who plays for Austrian lower league side ATSV Salzburg.

He also had a spell at Dubočica.
