= FK Železničar =

FK Železničar may refer:

- FK Železničar Beograd, a football club based in Belgrade, Serbia
- FK Železničar Inđija, a football club based in Inđija, Serbia
- FK Železničar Lajkovac, a football club based in Lajkovac, Serbia
- FK Železničar Niš, a football club based in Niš, Serbia
- FK Železničar Novi Sad, a football club based in Novi Sad, Serbia
- FK Železničar Pančevo, a football club based in Pančevo, Serbia
- FK Železničar Požarevac, a football club based in Požarevac, Serbia
- FK Železničar Vranjska Banja, a football club based in Vranjska Banja, Serbia
- FK Železničar 1930, a football club based in Smederevo, Serbia

== See also ==
- FK Željezničar (disambiguation)
- NK Železničar (disambiguation)
- NK Željezničar (disambiguation)
- KK Železničar (disambiguation)
