= 2005–06 Serbian First League =

Serbian First League
- Season: 2005–06
- Champions: Bežanija
- Promoted: Bežanija; Mladost Apatin
- Relegated: PSK Pančevo; Jedinstvo Ub; Radnički Kragujevac; Novi Sad; OFK Niš
- Matches played: 380
- Goals scored: 903 (2.38 per match)
- Top goalscorer: Žarko Lazetić (25 goals)

The Serbian First League (Serbian: Прва лига Србије; Prva liga Srbije) is the second-highest football league in Serbia (then Serbia and Montenegro). The league is operated by the Serbian FA. 20 teams competed in this league for the 2005–06 season, which was the league's inaugural season. Two teams were promoted to the Serbian SuperLiga and six were relegated the Serbian League, the third-highest division overall in the Serbian football league system.

== League table ==
Pos	Team	Pld	W	D	L	GF	GA	GD	Pts	Promotion or relegation
1	Bežanija (C, P)	38	25	7	6	70	25	+45	82	Promotion to Serbian SuperLiga
2	Mladost Apatin (P)	38	23	9	6	56	18	+38	78	Promotion to Serbian SuperLiga
3	Čukarički	38	22	9	7	63	29	+34	75	
4	ČSK Čelarevo	38	22	8	8	59	29	+30	74	
5	Srem	38	17	9	12	47	41	+6	60	
6	Napredak Kruševac	38	17	7	14	49	43	+6	58	
7	Mačva Šabac	38	14	13	11	54	55	−1	55	
8	Sevojno	38	13	13	12	44	42	+2	52	
9	Spartak Subotica	38	13	12	13	43	41	+2	51	
10	Radnički Niš	38	14	9	15	37	40	−3	51	
11	BASK	38	14	8	16	47	54	−7	50	
12	Mladenovac	38	12	11	15	36	46	−10	47	
13	Radnički Pirot	38	13	7	18	50	52	−2	46	
14	Vlasina	38	10	14	14	37	47	−10	44	
15	Novi Pazar	38	11	11	16	34	53	−19	44	
16	PSK Pančevo (R)	38	11	7	20	47	58	−11	40	Relegation to Serbian League
17	Jedinstvo Ub (R)	38	11	7	20	37	54	−17	40	Relegation to Serbian League
18	Radnički Kragujevac (R)	38	10	9	19	36	59	−23	39	Relegation to Serbian League
19	Novi Sad (R)	38	9	8	21	31	53	−22	35	Relegation to Serbian League
20	OFK Niš (R)	38	7	6	25	26	64	−38	27	Relegation to Serbian League

(C) Champions; (P) Promoted; (R) Relegated

== Results ==
Home \ Away	BASK	BEŽ	ČSK	ČUK	JED	MAČ	MLA	MAP	NAP	NPZ	NSD	NIŠ	PSK	RDK	RNI	RPI	SEV	SPA	SRM	VLA
BASK		1–4	1–0	2–1	3–1	0–0	4–0	1–0	3–1	1–1	2–0	1–0	1–0	1–0	3–3	1–2	3–1	2–1	1–1	2–1
Bežanija	3–2		3–0	0–0	2–0	7–0	2–0	1–0	1–0	4–1	2–0	4–0	1–0	3–0	1–1	1–1	1–1	3–0	2–1	3–0
ČSK Čelarevo	1–1	1–1		2–1	2–0	1–1	1–0	1–0	2–0	2–0	2–0	4–0	1–2	3–0	3–1	5–2	1–0	3–0	1–1	3–1
Čukarički	3–0	0–1	0–0		4–1	1–3	2–0	0–0	3–1	3–0	2–0	1–0	3–0	2–0	2–1	3–0	2–1	4–0	2–1	3–2
Jedinstvo Ub	1–0	1–0	0–1	1–2		2–1	1–1	1–2	3–0	1–0	0–1	1–0	2–0	0–0	1–2	2–1	1–1	2–3	1–0	1–1
Mačva Šabac	1–1	2–0	1–0	0–2	3–1		0–0	1–1	0–2	4–2	2–0	1–0	3–2	2–1	3–2	2–1	2–0	2–3	3–3	1–1
Mladenovac	1–1	0–3	1–2	2–1	4–2	2–1		1–0	2–1	2–0	0–1	1–0	3–1	1–2	1–1	1–1	0–0	1–1	2–1	1–2
Mladost Apatin	3–0	1–0	1–0	1–1	1–0	2–0	2–0		4–0	0–0	2–0	4–1	3–0	5–0	1–0	3–1	0–0	2–0	3–2	0–0
Napredak Kruševac	2–0	1–0	0–0	1–1	1–0	3–1	0–0	1–1		1–1	2–0	1–0	3–1	2–1	2–1	1–1	3–0	3–1	2–0	3–0
Novi Pazar	2–1	1–1	1–3	1–0	0–0	1–1	1–1	0–1	2–1		3–1	1–0	1–0	2–1	1–0	4–2	1–0	2–1	0–1	0–0
Novi Sad	3–2	0–1	1–0	3–1	1–1	1–1	0–0	0–1	0–1	0–0		2–3	3–0	3–2	0–0	4–1	0–2	1–1	0–1	1–1
OFK Niš	2–2	2–3	0–2	0–1	1–4	0–3	2–1	0–2	1–0	1–0	0–1		2–1	1–0	0–1	1–5	0–0	0–0	1–1	3–1
PSK Pančevo	2–0	1–2	2–3	0–0	4–1	1–2	1–0	1–2	2–0	4–1	3–0	2–0		1–1	2–1	3–1	1–1	1–1	3–3	2–3
Radnički Kragujevac	0–1	0–2	3–2	1–1	3–2	1–1	3–1	1–2	0–4	2–2	2–1	2–1	1–1		3–0	2–0	2–1	1–0	0–1	0–0
Radnički Niš	1–0	2–1	0–0	1–2	1–0	1–0	0–1	0–2	3–2	3–0	2–1	2–0	2–1	0–0		1–0	1–2	1–0	0–0	1–0
Radnički Pirot	4–1	2–0	1–2	2–2	0–1	1–1	1–2	1–0	4–0	3–0	3–0	2–1	0–1	0–0	1–0		1–0	1–0	0–1	0–1
Sevojno	1–0	0–2	2–1	0–0	2–1	2–2	1–1	0–2	2–1	3–1	1–1	3–0	3–0	3–1	1–1	3–1		1–1	3–0	1–1
Spartak Subotica	2–1	1–1	1–2	0–1	5–0	3–0	2–1	1–1	1–0	1–0	2–0	1–1	2–1	2–0	0–0	1–1	4–0		0–0	1–0
Srem	4–1	1–2	0–2	1–2	1–0	2–1	0–1	1–0	1–1	2–0	2–1	2–1	0–0	2–0	1–0	0–2	2–0	1–0		4–2
Vlasina	1–0	1–2	0–0	0–4	0–0	2–2	2–0	1–1	0–2	1–1	2–0	1–1	2–0	3–0	2–0	1–0	0–2	0–0	1–2	

Legend: Blue = home team win; Yellow = draw; Red = away team win.
