= Milan Božić (footballer) =

Canadian soccer player

Personal information
- Full name: Milan Božić
- Date of birth: January 23, 1982 (age 44)
- Place of birth: Toronto, Ontario
- Height: 1.90 m (6 ft 3 in)
- Position: Defensive midfielder

Senior career*
Years	Team	Apps	(Gls)
2001–2002	Zvezdara	4	(0)
2002–2005	Hajduk Beograd	55	(1)
2005–2006	Volyn Lutsk	2	(0)
2006–2007	Inđija	5	(0)
2007–2008	Železničar Beograd	3	(0)
2008	→ Kolubara (loan)	8	(0)
2008–2009	Leotar	4	(0)
2009–2010	Beograd	24	(1)
2010–2011	Trudbenik		
2011–2012	Sloga Bajina Bašta		
2012–2014	Zvezdara		
- * Club domestic league appearances and goals

Milan Božić (born January 23, 1982) is a Canadian football player of Serbian origin.

Božić previously played with Serbian top league clubs FK Zvezdara and FK Hajduk Beograd, Ukrainian club FC Volyn Lutsk, lower league Serbian clubs FK Inđija, FK Železničar Beograd and FK Kolubara and with the Bosnian Premier League club FK Leotar.

During the 2009–10 season, Božić played with FK Beograd in the Serbian League Belgrade. In 2012–13, he played with FK Bulbulderac, which restored its former name, FK Zvezdara in summer 2013.
