= Aleksandar Trajković =

Serbian footballer

Personal information
- Full name: Aleksandar Trajković
- Date of birth: 16 January 1981 (age 45)
- Place of birth: Niš, SFR Yugoslavia
- Height: 1.89 m (6 ft 2 1/2 in)
- Position: Centre-back

Senior career*
| Years | Team | Apps | (Gls) |
| 2001 | → Žitorađa (loan) | 15 | (0) |
| 2002 | → Mladi Obilić (loan) | | |
| 2002–2004 | Obilić | 1 | (0) |
| 2002–2003 | → Mladi Radnik (loan) | 16 | (0) |
| 2003 | Badnjevac | | |
| 2004 | → Timok (loan) | | |
| 2004–2005 | OFK Niš | 31 | (3) |
| 2005–2006 | ČSK Čelarevo | 34 | (3) |
| 2006–2007 | Radnički Niš | 44 | (3) |
| 2007 | Víðir | 15 | (3) |
| 2008 | Ordabasy | 29 | (3) |
| 2009 | Jagodina | 2 | (0) |
| 2009 | → Radnički Niš (loan) | 14 | (1) |
| 2010–2012 | Ordabasy | 79 | (7) |
| 2013 | Sinđelić Niš | 13 | (0) |
| 2013 | Víkingur | 4 | (0) |
| 2013–2014 | Žitorađa | 21 | (3) |
- * Club domestic league appearances and goals

Aleksandar Trajković (Serbian Cyrillic: Александар Трајковић; born 16 January 1981) is a Serbian retired football defender.

== Honours ==
Ordabasy

- Kazakhstan Cup: 2011
- Kazakhstan Super Cup: 2012
