= Lazar Mitrović (footballer, born 1998) =

Serbian footballer

Personal information
- Full name: Lazar Mitrović
- Date of birth: 18 August 1998 (age 28)
- Place of birth: Leskovac, FR Yugoslavia
- Height: 1.82 m (6 ft 0 in)
- Position: Centre forward

Youth career
- Sloga Leskovac
- 2015–2016: Radnički Niš
- 2017: Bohemians 1905

Senior career*
Years	Team	Apps	(Gls)
2016–2017	Radnički Niš	6	(0)
2018	Příbram	0	(0)
2018	→ Aritma Prague (loan)		
2018–2020	OFK Beograd	33	(10)
2020–2022	Dubočica	25	(4)
2023-	Vlasina		
- * Club domestic league appearances and goals as of 30 September 2019

Lazar Mitrović (Serbian Cyrillic: Лазар Митровић; born 18 August 1998) is a Serbian professional footballer who plays as a centre forward.

== Club career ==
Born in Leskovac, Mitrović passed the youth school of local club Sloga, where he played until summer 2015. Mitrović joined Radnički Niš in the beginning of the 2015–16 season. He made his SuperLiga debut on 18 March 2016 under coach Milan Rastavac against Novi Pazar. In April 2016, Mitrović signed a five-year professional contract with Radnički Niš. On 30 June 2016, Mitrović scored a brace in a friendly match against new SuperLiga club Bačka. Mitrović made his first appearance for the 2016–17 season in the Serbian Cup match against BSK Borča, played on 21 September 2016. On 24 February 2017, Mitrović moved to Bohemians 1905 on six-month loan deal with an option to break the contract from Radnički Niš.

== Career statistics ==
As of 26 September 2016

Club	Season	League			Cup		Continental		Other		Total	
Club	Season	Division	Apps	Goals	Apps	Goals	Apps	Goals	Apps	Goals	Apps	Goals
Radnički Niš	2015–16	Serbian SuperLiga	6	0	0	0	—		—		6	0
Radnički Niš	2016–17	Serbian SuperLiga	0	0	1	0	—		—		1	0
Radnički Niš	Total		6	0	1	0	—		—		7	0
