= Milan Marković (footballer, born 1979) =

Serbian footballer

Personal information
- Full name: Milan Marković
- Date of birth: 20 May 1979 (age 47)
- Place of birth: Niš, SFR Yugoslavia
- Height: 1.86 m (6 ft 1 in)
- Position: Centre-back

Senior career*
Years	Team	Apps	(Gls)
2001–2005	Radnički Niš	89	(3)
2005–2006	OFK Niš	14	(0)
2006	→ Vlasina (loan)	12	(0)
2006	Radnički Niš	5	(0)
2007-2008	Sileks	25	(1)
2008–2013	Sinđelić Niš	55	(3)
2012–2014	Žitorađa	53	(2)
- * Club domestic league appearances and goals as of 1 November 2014

Milan Marković (Serbian Cyrillic: Милан Марковић; born 20 May 1979) is a Serbian football defender.
