= Milan Božić =

Milan Božić may refer to:

- Milan Božić (footballer) (born 1982), Canadian soccer player of Serbian descent
- Milan Božić (politician) (born 1952), Serbian politician
