= 1998–99 Second League of FR Yugoslavia =

Second League of FR Yugoslavia
- Season: 1998–99
- Champions: Čukarički (East); Borac Čačak (West)

1998–99 Second League of FR Yugoslavia (Serbian: Druga liga SR Jugoslavije 1998/99) consisted of two groups of 18 teams.

The season was stopped on 14 May 1999, because of the NATO bombing of Yugoslavia, after 21 round.

== League table ==
=== East ===
| Pos | Team | Pld | W | D | L | GF | GA | GD | Pts | Promotion or relegation |
|---|---|---|---|---|---|---|---|---|---|---|
| 1 | Čukarički (C, P) | 21 | 14 | 5 | 2 | 62 | 18 | +44 | 47 | Promotion to First League of FR Yugoslavia |
| 2 | Hajduk Beograd (P) | 21 | 12 | 8 | 1 | 28 | 13 | +15 | 44 | Promotion to First League of FR Yugoslavia |
| 3 | Zvezdara | 21 | 13 | 3 | 5 | 47 | 18 | +29 | 42 | |
| 4 | Dinamo Pančevo | 21 | 12 | 5 | 4 | 42 | 26 | +16 | 41 | |
| 5 | Kolubara | 21 | 11 | 6 | 4 | 47 | 19 | +28 | 39 | |
| 6 | Novi Sad | 21 | 10 | 6 | 5 | 38 | 20 | +18 | 36 | |
| 7 | ČSK | 21 | 11 | 3 | 7 | 40 | 27 | +13 | 36 | |
| 8 | Mladost Apatin | 21 | 11 | 1 | 9 | 43 | 21 | +22 | 34 | |
| 9 | Vrbas | 21 | 10 | 3 | 8 | 32 | 19 | +13 | 33 | |
| 10 | Kikinda | 21 | 8 | 2 | 11 | 38 | 33 | +5 | 26 | |
| 11 | Radnički Beograd | 21 | 8 | 2 | 11 | 34 | 34 | 0 | 26 | |
| 12 | Bor | 21 | 6 | 7 | 8 | 33 | 30 | +3 | 25 | |
| 13 | Jedinstvo Paraćin | 21 | 8 | 1 | 12 | 22 | 32 | −10 | 25 | |
| 14 | Beograd | 21 | 6 | 5 | 10 | 29 | 33 | −4 | 23 | |
| 15 | Napredak Kruševac | 21 | 6 | 5 | 10 | 25 | 29 | −4 | 23 | |
| 16 | Bečej | 21 | 6 | 4 | 11 | 27 | 34 | −7 | 22 | |
| 17 | Palilulac Beograd | 21 | 3 | 2 | 16 | 27 | 71 | −44 | 11 | |
| 18 | Winner Broker (R) | 21 | 0 | 0 | 21 | 9 | 146 | −137 | 0 | Relegation to Serbian League |

Source: rsssf.org
Rules for classification: 1) points; 2) goal difference; 3) number of goals scored.
(C) Champions; (P) Promoted; (R) Relegated

=== West ===
| Pos | Team | Pld | W | D | L | GF | GA | GD | Pts | Promotion |
|---|---|---|---|---|---|---|---|---|---|---|
| 1 | Borac Čačak (C, P) | 21 | 15 | 3 | 3 | 51 | 16 | +35 | 48 | Promotion to First League of FR Yugoslavia |
| 2 | Sutjeska (P) | 21 | 13 | 4 | 4 | 45 | 21 | +24 | 43 | Promotion to First League of FR Yugoslavia |
| 3 | Bane | 21 | 13 | 2 | 6 | 40 | 21 | +19 | 41 | |
| 4 | Zeta | 21 | 10 | 7 | 4 | 30 | 20 | +10 | 37 | |
| 5 | Železničar Lajkovac | 21 | 9 | 6 | 6 | 29 | 26 | +3 | 33 | |
| 6 | Berane | 21 | 10 | 3 | 8 | 30 | 29 | +1 | 33 | |
| 7 | Rudar Pljevlja | 21 | 11 | 0 | 10 | 26 | 25 | +1 | 33 | |
| 8 | Lovćen | 21 | 10 | 2 | 9 | 27 | 31 | −4 | 32 | |
| 9 | Javor Ivanjica | 21 | 9 | 3 | 9 | 28 | 30 | −2 | 30 | |
| 10 | Mladost Lučani | 21 | 9 | 2 | 10 | 21 | 27 | −6 | 29 | |
| 11 | Novi Pazar | 21 | 8 | 4 | 9 | 29 | 32 | −3 | 28 | |
| 12 | Budućnost Valjevo | 21 | 8 | 4 | 9 | 31 | 39 | −8 | 28 | |
| 13 | Mladi Radnik | 21 | 7 | 6 | 8 | 31 | 29 | +2 | 27 | |
| 14 | Loznica | 21 | 8 | 3 | 10 | 28 | 32 | −4 | 27 | |
| 15 | Čelik Nikšić | 21 | 7 | 2 | 12 | 22 | 36 | −14 | 23 | |
| 16 | Sloboda Užice | 21 | 5 | 4 | 12 | 21 | 27 | −6 | 19 | |
| 17 | Crvena Zvezda Gnjilane | 21 | 4 | 3 | 14 | 23 | 42 | −19 | 15 | |
| 18 | Sloga Kraljevo | 21 | 3 | 2 | 16 | 15 | 44 | −29 | 11 | |

Source: rsssf.org
Rules for classification: 1) points; 2) goal difference; 3) number of goals scored.
(C) Champions; (P) Promoted
