= 2002–03 Second League of Serbia and Montenegro =

The 2002–03 Second League of Serbia and Montenegro season (Serbian: Druga Savezna Liga) consisted of four groups of 12 teams.

The competition started this season as Second League of FR Yugoslavia. The country changed name from FR Yugoslavia to Serbia and Montenegro on February 4, 2003, and the competition became the Second League of Serbia and Montenegro.

== League table ==
=== North ===
Pos	Team	Pld	W	D	L	GF	GA	GD	Pts	Promotion or relegation
1	Budućnost Banatski Dvor (C, P)	33	22	10	1	55	18	+37	76	Promotion to First League of Serbia and Montenegro
2	Mladost Apatin	33	21	9	3	60	18	+42	72	
3	Radnički Beograd	33	18	7	8	63	38	+25	61	
4	Novi Sad	33	17	7	9	53	26	+27	58	
5	Veternik	33	15	5	13	34	38	−4	50	
6	Elan	33	12	8	13	38	44	−6	44	
7	Mladost Lukićevo	33	10	10	13	34	32	+2	40	
8	Vrbas	33	10	8	15	32	44	−12	38	
9	Bečej	33	9	9	15	37	46	−9	36	
10	Big Bull Bačinci (R)	33	8	9	16	27	37	−10	33	Relegation to Serbian League
11	Dinamo Pančevo (R)	33	7	4	22	25	56	−31	25	Relegation to Serbian League
12	Srem Jakovo (R)	33	3	6	24	21	82	−61	15	Relegation to Serbian League

Source: rsssf.org
Rules for classification: 1) points; 2) goal difference; 3) number of goals scored.
(C) Champions; (P) Promoted; (R) Relegated

=== East ===
Pos	Team	Pld	W	D	L	GF	GA	GD	Pts	Promotion or relegation
1	Napredak Kruševac (C, P)	33	23	4	6	52	23	+29	73	Promotion to First League of Serbia and Montenegro
2	Mladi Radnik	33	15	7	11	45	38	+7	52	
3	Timok	33	13	11	9	45	29	+16	50	
4	Srem	33	12	14	7	45	31	+14	50	
5	OFK Niš	33	12	14	7	39	35	+4	50	
6	FK Beograd	33	12	12	9	58	43	+15	48	
7	Hajduk Beograd	33	11	12	10	46	37	+9	45	
8	Radnički Pirot	33	13	6	14	52	57	−5	45	
9	Dorćol (R)	33	9	14	10	44	38	+6	41	Relegation to Serbian League
10	Žitorađa (R)	33	10	9	14	33	43	−10	39	Relegation to Serbian League
11	Car Konstantin (R)	33	5	8	20	34	82	−48	23	Relegation to Serbian League
12	Dubočica (R)	33	5	5	23	32	69	−37	20	Relegation to Serbian League

Source: rsssf.org
Rules for classification: 1) points; 2) goal difference; 3) number of goals scored.
(C) Champions; (P) Promoted; (R) Relegated

=== West ===
Pos	Team	Pld	W	D	L	GF	GA	GD	Pts	Promotion or relegation
1	Borac Čačak (C, P)	33	17	10	6	43	27	+16	61	Promotion to First League of Serbia and Montenegro
2	Bane	33	15	8	10	49	35	+14	53	
3	Šumadija	33	14	11	8	50	38	+12	53	
4	Loznica	33	15	7	11	42	35	+7	52	
5	Mačva Šabac	33	15	7	11	30	33	−3	52	
6	Metalac G.M.	33	13	12	8	31	27	+4	51	
7	Mladenovac (R)	33	14	6	13	44	41	+3	48	Relegation to Serbian League
8	Radnički Kragujevac (R)	33	10	10	13	36	41	−5	40	Relegation to Serbian League
9	Mladost Lučani (R)	33	8	11	14	35	43	−8	35	Relegation to Serbian League
10	Radnički Stobex (R)	33	7	13	13	35	39	−4	34	Relegation to Serbian League
11	Budućnost Valjevo (R)	33	10	4	19	32	48	−16	34	Relegation to Serbian League
12	Remont Čačak (R)	33	8	5	20	29	49	−20	29	Relegation to Serbian League

Source: rsssf.org
Rules for classification: 1) points; 2) goal difference; 3) number of goals scored.
(C) Champions; (P) Promoted; (R) Relegated

=== South (Montenegro) ===
Pos	Team	Pld	W	D	L	GF	GA	GD	Pts	Promotion or relegation
1	Kom (C, P)	33	23	7	3	65	26	+39	76	Promotion to First League of Serbia and Montenegro
2	Bokelj	33	20	4	9	54	28	+26	64	
3	Budućnost Podgorica	33	15	10	8	46	29	+17	55	
4	Mladost Podgorica	33	15	8	10	45	33	+12	53	
5	Mornar	33	13	8	12	44	35	+9	47	
6	Petrovac	33	13	6	14	36	34	+2	45	
7	Čelik Nikšić	33	10	14	9	44	39	+5	44	
8	Jedinstvo Bijelo Polje	33	12	7	14	50	45	+5	43 (Note: Head-to-head points: Jedinstvo Bijelo Polje 7 pts, Jezero 1 pts.)	
9	Jezero (R)	33	12	7	14	33	40	−7	43	Relegation to Montenegrin League
10	Lovćen (R)	33	9	10	14	43	45	−2	37	Relegation to Montenegrin League
11	Iskra Danilovgrad (R)	33	7	7	19	18	53	−35	28	Relegation to Montenegrin League
12	Zabjelo (R)	33	4	2	27	20	91	−71	14	Relegation to Montenegrin League

Source: rsssf.org
Rules for classification: 1) points; 2) goal difference; 3) number of goals scored.
(C) Champions; (P) Promoted; (R) Relegated
