= Dušan Mladenović =

Dušan Mladenović may refer to:

- Dušan Mladenović (footballer, born 1990), Serbian association football player
- Dušan Mladenović (footballer, born 1995), Serbian association football player
