= Milan Marković (disambiguation) =

Milan Marković is a Serbian politician.

Milan Marković may also refer to:

- Milan Marković (volleyball)
- Milan Marković (footballer, born 1979)
- Milan Marković (basketball)
