= FK Beograd =

FK Beograd may refer to:

- FK Beograd (Australia), an Australian soccer team
- FK Beograd (Serbia), a defunct Serbian football team

== See also ==
- OFK Beograd, a Serbian professional football team
