= 1999–2000 Second League of FR Yugoslavia =

Second League of FR Yugoslavia
- Season: 1999–2000
- Champions: Beograd (North); Napredak Kruševac (East); Zeta (West)

The 1999–2000 Second League of FR Yugoslavia season (Serbian: Druga liga SR Jugoslavije 1999/2000) consisted of three groups of 18 teams.

Originally 14 teams from 7 groups of Third Division would be promoted, but in the end only 13 teams remained (only one of which was from the Timok Group). It was not necessary to relegate one team from Second League East, as Crvena Zvezda Gnjilane had already withdrawn.

Due to the formation of South Group (Montenegro), no team were relegated in West Group.

== League table ==
=== North ===
Pos	Team	Pld	W	D	L	GF	GA	GD	Pts	Promotion or relegation
1	Beograd (C)	34	22	6	6	65	35	+30	72	Promotion to First League of FR Yugoslavia (Note: FK Beograd withdrew from promotion and replaced by FK Smederevo)
2	Novi Sad	34	19	5	10	62	41	+21	62	
3	Radnički Beograd	34	19	4	11	64	45	+19	61	
4	Zvezdara	34	19	4	11	54	37	+17	61	
5	Vrbas	34	17	8	9	45	37	+8	59	
6	Mladost Apatin	34	15	6	13	55	32	+23	51	
7	BSK Borča	34	15	6	13	53	42	+11	51	
8	Kolubara	34	14	9	11	43	38	+5	51	
9	Cement Beočin	34	14	8	12	42	34	+8	50	
10	ČSK	34	15	5	14	41	37	+4	50	
11	Teleoptik	34	15	5	14	57	55	+2	50	
12	Železničar Beograd	34	14	7	13	52	52	0	49	
13	Bečej	34	12	8	14	39	53	−14	44	
14	Big Bull Bačinci	34	12	7	15	47	45	+2	43	
15	Kabel	34	12	4	18	40	54	−14	40	
16	Dinamo Pančevo	34	8	9	17	33	51	−18	33	
17	Kikinda (R)	34	5	7	22	28	65	−37	22	Relegation to Serbian League
18	Palilulac Beograd (R)	34	4	2	28	17	84	−67	14	Relegation to Serbian League

Source: rsssf.org
Rules for classification: 1) points; 2) goal difference; 3) number of goals scored.
(C) Champions; (R) Relegated

=== East ===
Pos	Team	Pld	W	D	L	GF	GA	GD	Pts	Promotion or relegation
1	Napredak Kruševac (C, P)	32	23	3	6	70	28	+42	72	Promotion to First League of FR Yugoslavia
2	Železničar Lajkovac	32	17	9	6	58	27	+31	60	
3	Budućnost Valjevo	32	16	6	10	59	38	+21	54	
4	Jedinstvo Paraćin	32	15	8	9	54	28	+26	53	
5	OFK Niš	32	14	7	11	41	31	+10	49	
6	Radnički Svilajnac	32	15	4	13	45	40	+5	49	
7	Trayal Kruševac	32	14	5	13	36	45	−9	47	
8	ZSK Valjevo	32	13	6	13	41	37	+4	45	
9	Loznica	32	11	9	12	38	39	−1	42	
10	Mladi Radnik	32	11	7	14	39	54	−15	40	
11	Dubočica	32	10	8	14	30	42	−12	38	
12	Temnić 1924	32	11	5	16	30	52	−22	38	
13	Bor	32	9	9	14	33	35	−2	36	
14	Vučje	32	10	5	17	46	59	−13	35	
15	Rudar Kostolac	32	11	2	19	39	54	−15	35	
16	Rudar Aleksinac	32	9	8	15	36	65	−29	35	
17	Rađevac (R)	32	9	7	16	31	52	−21	34	Relegation to Serbian League

Source: rsssf.org
Rules for classification: 1) points; 2) goal difference; 3) number of goals scored.
(C) Champions; (P) Promoted; (R) Relegated

Crvena Zvezda Gnjilane withdrew at the start of season

=== West ===
Pos	Team	Pld	W	D	L	GF	GA	GD	Pts	Promotion or relegation
1	Zeta (C, P)	34	26	6	2	91	25	+66	84	Promotion to First League of FR Yugoslavia
2	Mladost Lučani (Note: 5 points deducted)	34	23	6	5	70	26	+44	70	
3	Novi Pazar	34	19	4	11	61	28	+33	61	
4	Bane	34	16	13	5	54	31	+23	61	
5	Sloboda Užice	34	16	9	9	59	34	+25	57	
6	Zlatibor Užice	34	16	4	14	50	42	+8	52	
7	Rudar Pljevlja	34	14	10	10	39	37	+2	52	
8	Bokelj	34	15	6	13	38	33	+5	51	
9	Sloga Kraljevo	34	13	7	14	23	46	−23	46	
10	Javor Ivanjica	34	11	11	12	50	47	+3	44	
11	Mladost Podgorica	34	12	5	17	41	49	−8	41	
12	Šumadija 1903	34	11	6	17	27	45	−18	39	
13	Čelik Nikšić	34	11	5	18	47	41	+6	38	
14	Lovćen	34	9	10	15	34	48	−14	37	
15	Jedinstvo Bijelo Polje	34	9	10	15	31	45	−14	37	
16	Grbalj	34	10	6	18	25	61	−36	36	
17	Ibar	34	7	8	19	34	74	−40	29	
18	Berane	34	3	4	27	22	84	−62	13	

Source: rsssf.org
Rules for classification: 1) points; 2) goal difference; 3) number of goals scored.
(C) Champions; (P) Promoted
