= Aleksandar Andrejević =

Serbian footballer (born 1992)

Personal information
- Full name: Aleksandar Andrejević
- Date of birth: 28 March 1992 (age 34)
- Place of birth: Belgrade, SFR Yugoslavia
- Height: 1.89 m (6 ft 2 1/2 in)
- Position: Centre-back

Senior career*
Years	Team	Apps	(Gls)
2008–2010	Mladenovac	5	(0)
2010–2011	Čukarički	1	(0)
2011–2014	Příbram	11	(0)
2014–2015	Timok	24	(1)
2015–2016	Donji Srem	26	(0)
2016–2021	Proleter Novi Sad	115	(11)
2021	Gwangju FC	31	(1)
2022	Proleter Novi Sad	12	(0)
2022	RFK Novi Sad	14	(0)
2023	Qingdao Hainiu	27	(2)
2024	Chongqing Tonglianglong	29	(1)
2025	Suzhou Dongwu	28	(1)

International career^{‡}
2021–	Serbia	1	(0)
- * Club domestic league appearances and goals as of 1 November 2025 ‡ National team caps and goals as of 29 January 2021

Aleksandar Andrejević (Serbian Cyrillic: Александар Андрејевић; born 28 March 1992) is a Serbian footballer who plays as defender.

== Club career ==
=== FK Příbram ===
In July 2011, Andrejević moved to FK Příbram for an undisclosed fee. He made his league debut for the club on 1 October 2011 in a 3-0 home defeat to Sparta Prague. He played all ninety minutes of the match.

=== Donji Srem ===
In July 2015, Andrejević moved to FK Donji Srem on a free transfer. He made his league debut for the club on 15 August 2015 in a 2-2 home draw with Sinđelić Beograd. He played all ninety minutes of the match.

=== Proleter Novi Sad ===
In July 2016, Andrejević moved to FK Proleter Novi Sad on a free transfer. He made his league debut for the club on 14 August 2016 in a 1-1 away draw with Dinamo Vranje. He played all ninety minutes of the match. He scored his first league goal for the club nearly three months later, on 10 September 2016 in a 1-1 away draw with Zemun. His goal, scored in the 39th minute, made the score 1-0 to Proleter.

=== Gwangju FC ===
In March 2021, Andrejević moved to Gwangju FC.

=== Qingdao Hainiu ===
In March 2023, Andrejević joined Chinese Super League club Qingdao Hainiu.

=== Chongqing Tonglianglong ===
On 24 February 2024, Andrejević joined China League One club Chongqing Tonglianglong.

== International career ==
On the national level, Andrejević made his debut for Serbia in a January 2021 friendly match away against Panama.

== Career statistics ==
=== Club ===
As of match played 1 November 2025

Appearances and goals by club, season and competition
Club	Season	League			Cup		Continental		Other		Total	
Club	Season	Division	Apps	Goals	Apps	Goals	Apps	Goals	Apps	Goals	Apps	Goals
Čukarički	2010–11	Serbian SuperLiga	1	0	0	0	—		—		1	0
Příbram	2011–12	Czech First League	7	0	0	0	—		—		7	0
Příbram	2012–13	Czech First League	1	0	0	0	—		—		1	0
Příbram	2013–14	Czech First League	3	0	1	0	—		—		4	0
Příbram	Total		11	0	1	0	—		—		12	0
Timok	2014–15	Serbian League East	24	1	0	0	—		—		24	1
Donji Srem	2015–16	Serbian First League	26	0	1	0	—		—		27	0
Proleter Novi Sad	2016–17	Serbian First League	27	2	1	0	—		—		28	2
Proleter Novi Sad	2017–18	Serbian First League	25	7	2	0	—		—		27	7
Proleter Novi Sad	2018–19	Serbian SuperLiga	20	1	1	0	—		—		21	1
Proleter Novi Sad	2019–20	Serbian SuperLiga	27	1	1	0	—		—		28	1
Proleter Novi Sad	2020–21	Serbian SuperLiga	16	0	2	0	—		—		18	0
Proleter Novi Sad	Total		115	11	7	0	—		—		122	11
Gwangju FC	2021	K League 1	31	1	0	0	—		—		31	1
Proleter Novi Sad	2021–22	Serbian SuperLiga	12	0	0	0	—		—		12	0
RFK Novi Sad	2022–23	Serbian First League	14	0	0	0	—		—		14	0
Qingdao Hainiu	2023	Chinese Super League	27	2	2	0	—		—		29	2
Chongqing Tonglianglong	2024	China League One	29	1	1	0	—		—		30	1
Suzhou Dongwu	2025	China League One	28	1	0	0	—		—		28	1
Career total			318	17	12	0	0	0	0	0	330	17

== Honours ==
Proleter Novi Sad

- Serbian First League: 2017–18
