= Božidar Milenković =

Serbian footballer and coach (1954–2020)

Personal information
- Date of birth: 6 March 1954
- Place of birth: Vlasotince, FPR Yugoslavia
- Date of death: 25 July 2020 (aged 66)
- Place of death: Belgrade, Serbia
- Position: Defender

Youth career
- Vlasina

Senior career*
Years	Team	Apps	(Gls)
1973–1975	Dubočica		
1975–1986	OFK Beograd	271	(16)
1986	Toronto Italia		
1987	Hamilton Steelers	13	(1)
1987–1988	OFK Beograd	3	(0)

Managerial career
- 1996–1997: OFK Beograd
- Železničar Beograd
- * Club domestic league appearances and goals

Božidar Milenković (6 March 1954 – 25 July 2020) was a Serbian professional footballer and coach.

== Career ==
Milenković began his career with his hometown club FK Vlasina. In 1973, he signed with FK Dubočica, and played with the club until 1975. In the summer of 1975 he played in the Yugoslav First League with OFK Beograd where he captained the team for eight years. In the summer of 1986, he played abroad in Canada's National Soccer League with Toronto Italia. He assisted Toronto in securing the NSL Championship by defeating Toronto Blizzard. In 1987, he returned to conclude his career with OFK Beograd. In 1987, he played with the Hamilton Steelers.

In 1996, he served as the head coach for OFK Beograd in the First League of FR Yugoslavia. He later served as a club official for OFK Beograd in the capacities of the director of the stadium, and general secretary.

== Personal life ==
On 25 July 2020, he died from COVID-19.
