= Braničevo District League =

- Country: Serbia
- Number of clubs: 14
- Level on pyramid: 5
- Promotion to: Dunav Zone League
- Relegation to: Međuopštinska Liga Mlava; Međuopštinska Liga Dunav
- Domestic cup: Serbian Cup
- Current champions: Sloga Veliko Selo (2024-25)
- Website: at Srbija Sport

Braničevo District League is a section of the District Leagues, one of the fifth-tier divisions of the Serbian football league system. The league is operated by the Football Association of Serbia.

The league consists of 14 clubs from Braničevo District which play each other in a double round-robin league, with each club playing the other club home and away. At the end of the season the top club will be promoted to Dunav Zone League.

== See also ==
- Serbia national football team
- Serbian Superliga
- Serbian First League
- Serbian League
- Zone Leagues
