= Dragan Dobrić =

Serbian footballer

Personal information
- Date of birth: 11 March 1986 (age 40)
- Place of birth: Osijek, SR Croatia, SFR Yugoslavia
- Height: 1.80 m (5 ft 11 in)
- Position: Forward

Youth career
- OFK Beograd

Senior career*
Years	Team	Apps	(Gls)
2005	BSK Borča		
2005–2008	Palilulac Beograd		
2008–2010	Hajduk Kula	2	(0)
2009–2010	→ Paliluac Beograd (loan)		
2010	Dinamo Vranje	15	(2)
2011	Srem Jakovo		
2011	GOŠK Gabela	3	(0)
2012	Resnik		
2012–xxxx	PKB Padinska Skela		
2014–2016	Crvenka		
2022–xxxx	Vihor Maljurevac		
- * Club domestic league appearances and goals

Dragan Dobrić (born 11 March 1986) is a Serbian former professional footballer who played as a forward.

== Career ==
Born in Osijek, SR Croatia, back in Yugoslavia, Dragan Dobrić spent most of his career in Serbia. He played with the youth team of OFK Beograd. He made his debut as senior during the second half of the 2004–05 season when he played with FK BSK Borča. Borča is located in Belgrade's municipality of Palilula, and in summer 2005 Dobrić moved to BSK rivals within the municipality, FK Palilulac Beograd where he stayed for the following three seasons playing in the Serbian League Belgrade. In summer 2008 he was brought by top-tier side FK Hajduk Kula. The competition at Hajduk attack that season was tough, they included strikers like Filip Kasalica, Nikola Komazec, Aleksandar Davidov or Zoran Rajović, so at the end of the season Dobrić made two appearances in the 2008–09 Serbian SuperLiga and he was loaned to his former club Palilulac for the next season. Next, he played with FK Dinamo Vranje in the first half of the 2010–11 Serbian First League while the rest of the season he played with FK Srem Jakovo. In summer 2011 he joined a club from the Croatian part of Bosnia and Herzegovina, NK GOŠK Gabela, which had just been promoted to the Bosnian highest level after winning the 2010–11 First League of the Federation of Bosnia and Herzegovina, one of two Bosnian second tiers, the Bosniak and Croat one. Dobrić made three appearances with GOŠK in the first half of the 2011–12 Premier League of Bosnia and Herzegovina and during the winter-break he returned to Serbia and joined third-level side FK Resnik playing in the Serbian League Belgrade. Next summer he moved to a club from same league, FK PKB Padinska Skela.
