= Nenad Vasić =

Serbian footballer

Personal information
- Full name: Nenad Vasić
- Date of birth: 28 July 1979 (age 47)
- Place of birth: Trstenik, SFR Yugoslavia
- Height: 1.75 m (5 ft 9 in)
- Position: Striker

Senior career*
Years	Team	Apps	(Gls)
2001–2004	Omladinac Novo Selo		
2004–2005	Metalac Trgovački	30	(10)
2005–2007	Napredak Kruševac	71	(24)
2007–2008	Mladost Lučani	11	(0)
2008	→ Jagodina (loan)	14	(2)
2008	Jagodina	5	(0)
2009	Sileks	0	(0)
2009–2011	Grbalj	48	(8)
2011–2012	Prva Petoletka	29	(11)
2012	Srem	14	(2)
2013	Radnički Pirot	27	(2)
2014	Sloga Despotovac	9	(4)
2014–2015	Prva Petoletka	40	(14)
2016	Stubal		
2016–2023	Prva Petoletka		
- * Club domestic league appearances and goals as of 16 June 2017

Nenad Vasić (Serbian Cyrillic: Ненад Васић; born 28 July 1979) is a Serbian footballer.

Born in Trstenik, he played with FK Jagodina and FK Mladost Lučani in the Serbian SuperLiga.
