= NK Željezničar =

NK Željezničar may refer to:

- NK Željezničar Pridjel Gornji
- NK Željezničar Markovac Našički, Markovac Našički
- NK Željezničar Moravice, Moravice
- NK Željezničar Zagreb, Zagreb

== See also ==
- NK Železničar (disambiguation)
- FK Željezničar (disambiguation)
- FK Železničar (disambiguation)
