= KK Železničar =

KK Železničar may refer to:

- Basketball teams in Serbia
  - KK Železničar Beograd, based in Belgrade
  - KK Železničar Čačak, based in Čačak (1949–present)
  - KK Železničar Inđija, based in Inđija (1970–present)
  - KK Železničar Lajkovac, based in Lajkovac (1978–present)
- Basketball teams in Slovenia,
  - Železničar Ljubljana, based in Ljubljana (1943–1960)
  - Železničar Maribor, based in Maribor (1946–2006)

== See also ==
- KK Željezničar Sarajevo
- FK Železničar (disambiguation)
