= Nebojša Maksimović =

Serbian football manager and player

Personal information
- Full name: Nebojša Maksimović
- Date of birth: 10 December 1965 (age 60)
- Place of birth: SFR Yugoslavia
- Height: 1.85 m (6 ft 1 in)
- Position: Striker

Team information
- Current team: Timok (manager)

Senior career*
Years	Team	Apps	(Gls)
1991–1992	Voždovac		
1992–1993	Obilić		
1993–1994	Red Star Belgrade	13	(1)
1994	Ilhwa Chunma	11	(2)
1995–1996	Paniliakos	0	(0)

Managerial career
- Jedinstvo Ub
- 2007–2008: Dinamo Vranje
- 2009: Jagodina
- 2009–2010: Mladi Radnik
- 2010: Kolubara
- Red Star Belgrade (youth)
- 2016: Zemun
- 2019: Yanbian Beiguo
- 2020: Smederevo
- 2020: Radnički 1912
- 2022: Mladi Radnik
- 2025-: Timok
- * Club domestic league appearances and goals

Nebojša Maksimović (Serbian Cyrillic: Небојша Максимовић; born 10 December 1965) is a Serbian football manager and former player.

== Playing career ==
Maksimović played for Red Star Belgrade during the 1993–94 First League of FR Yugoslavia, before transferring abroad to South Korean club Ilhwa Chunma. He also played in Greece.

== Managerial career ==
After hanging up his boots, Maksimović served as manager of Serbian SuperLiga clubs Jagodina and Mladi Radnik. He also worked in China and was at the helm at Smederevo for only a short period of time after the dismissal of Ognjen Koroman. He then moved to Radnički 1912 and rejoined Mladi Radnik in April 2022, succeeding Gabrijel Radojičić.

In summer 2025, he took charge of Timok.

== Honours ==
Ilhwa Chunma

- K League 1: 1994
