= FK Željezničar (disambiguation) =

FK Željezničar may refer to:

- FK Željezničar Sarajevo
- FK Željezničar Banja Luka
- FK Željezničar Doboj

== See also ==
- FK Železničar (disambiguation)
- NK Željezničar (disambiguation)
- NK Železničar (disambiguation)
