= 2006–07 Serbian First League =

Serbian First League
- Season: 2006–07
- Champions: Mladost Lučani
- Promoted: Mladost Lučani; Čukarički; Napredak Kruševac
- Relegated: Obilić; Spartak Subotica; BASK; Mačva Šabac; Dinamo Vranje; Inđija
- Matches played: 380
- Goals scored: 831 (2.19 per match)
- Top goalscorer: Filip Đorđević (16 goals)
- Biggest home win: BSK 7–1 Spartak (21 April 2007)
- Biggest away win: Mačva 0–5 Mladenovac (9 May 2007)
- Highest scoring: BSK 7–1 Spartak (21 April 2007); Radnički Pirot 6–2 Spartak (4 October 2006)

The 2006–07 Serbian First League (referred to as the Prva Liga Telekom Srbija for sponsorship reasons) was the second season of the league under its current title.

== League table ==
Pos	Team	Pld	W	D	L	GF	GA	GD	Pts	Promotion or relegation
1	Mladost Lučani (C, P)	38	24	10	4	49	19	+30	82	Promotion to Serbian SuperLiga
2	Čukarički (P)	38	20	10	8	42	15	+27	70	Promotion to Serbian SuperLiga
3	Napredak Kruševac (P)	38	19	8	11	52	38	+14	65	Qualification for promotion play-offs
4	BSK Borča	38	16	14	8	55	35	+20	62	Qualification for promotion play-offs
5	Rad	38	18	8	12	53	34	+19	62	Qualification for promotion play-offs
6	Radnički Pirot	38	17	8	13	52	36	+16	59	Qualification for promotion play-offs
7	Sevojno	38	17	8	13	47	42	+5	59	
8	ČSK Čelarevo	38	13	17	8	38	26	+12	56	
9	Vlasina	38	14	14	10	38	37	+1	56	
10	Mladenovac	38	15	10	13	55	44	+11	55	
11	Radnički Niš	38	14	13	11	45	35	+10	55	
12	Javor Ivanjica	38	15	9	14	35	42	−7	54	
13	Novi Pazar	38	15	8	15	45	51	−6	53	
14	Srem	38	13	9	16	39	47	−8	48	
15	Inđija (R)	38	11	13	14	42	51	−9	46	Relegation to Serbian League
16	Dinamo Vranje (R)	38	10	15	13	33	37	−4	45	Relegation to Serbian League
17	Mačva Šabac (R)	38	10	11	17	26	49	−23	41	Relegation to Serbian League
18	BASK (R)	38	8	11	19	32	46	−14	35	Relegation to Serbian League
19	Spartak Subotica (R)	38	6	8	24	35	64	−29	26	Relegation to Serbian League
20	Obilić (R)	38	0	6	32	16	81	−65	6	Relegation to Serbian League

Source: srbijasport.net
Rules for classification: 1) points; 2) goal difference; 3) number of goals scored.
(C) Champions; (P) Promoted; (R) Relegated

== Results ==
Home \ Away	BASK	BSK	ČSK	ČUK	DVR	INĐ	JAV	MAČ	MLA	MLU	NAP	NPZ	OBI	RAD	RNI	RPI	SEV	SPA	SRM	VLA
BASK		0–1	1–1	0–2	1–0	2–0	1–0	0–2	2–3	1–2	0–2	1–0	1–1	0–3	0–0	2–0	0–1	1–1	2–0	0–0
BSK Borča	2–2		1–1	1–0	2–1	4–1	2–0	3–0	1–1	0–1	0–1	2–0	5–0	2–1	1–0	2–0	1–1	7–1	3–0	1–1
ČSK Čelarevo	1–1	0–0		1–1	1–1	1–0	3–0	1–1	1–1	1–1	2–2	2–1	3–0	1–0	0–1	2–0	1–0	1–0	5–1	1–0
Čukarički	2–1	0–0	1–0		3–0	1–0	3–0	3–0	0–0	0–0	1–0	3–0	1–0	3–0	1–0	2–0	1–2	2–0	0–0	5–1
Dinamo Vranje	0–0	1–1	0–0	0–0		2–0	1–0	0–0	0–0	1–1	1–0	1–0	4–0	0–0	0–1	0–1	1–2	1–1	2–0	0–3
Inđija	1–1	2–2	1–1	1–1	1–1		1–1	0–0	2–3	1–1	2–1	1–1	3–1	1–0	0–0	2–1	2–0	1–1	3–1	3–0
Javor Ivanjica	1–0	1–0	1–1	1–0	1–0	0–2		1–0	1–2	0–2	3–3	2–0	2–1	2–0	1–0	2–0	0–0	3–1	1–0	2–0
Mačva Šabac	1–0	1–1	0–1	1–0	1–1	0–3	1–1		0–5	0–1	0–0	1–0	2–0	1–2	1–1	0–0	1–0	2–1	1–2	0–0
Mladenovac	2–1	1–2	1–1	0–0	2–1	3–0	2–2	1–0		1–2	1–2	2–1	3–1	0–2	3–3	1–0	4–0	3–1	4–0	1–1
Mladost Lučani	1–0	3–0	1–1	0–1	3–1	3–1	0–0	1–0	2–0		2–0	0–0	2–0	2–1	2–0	0–1	1–0	2–0	2–0	1–0
Napredak Kruševac	2–1	2–2	1–0	1–0	1–1	3–1	0–1	2–0	1–0	2–0		3–1	2–0	0–3	4–1	1–0	1–0	5–2	1–1	3–2
Novi Pazar	2–1	2–0	0–0	1–0	0–1	1–0	1–1	3–1	1–0	0–1	2–0		2–1	3–2	3–2	2–2	1–1	1–0	3–1	3–1
Obilić	1–1	0–2	0–1	0–1	1–2	0–2	1–3	1–2	0–2	0–1	0–0	1–1		0–4	1–3	1–3	0–3	0–0	0–2	0–1
Rad	1–1	0–1	2–1	0–0	3–2	3–1	1–0	1–1	1–0	1–1	1–0	2–0	1–1		2–1	2–0	3–0	1–1	2–0	1–0
Radnički Niš	3–2	0–2	1–0	2–0	0–0	2–0	3–0	3–1	1–1	1–1	1–2	4–1	2–0	1–1		1–1	2–0	2–1	2–0	0–0
Radnički Pirot	2–0	3–0	0–0	0–1	3–0	4–0	2–0	3–0	3–1	0–1	2–1	3–0	3–2	2–1	0–0		1–1	6–2	1–0	0–0
Sevojno	0–1	1–0	1–0	1–1	1–2	4–1	3–0	3–2	2–1	2–2	1–1	2–3	1–0	2–1	1–0	0–3		1–0	5–1	2–2
Spartak Subotica	1–3	2–0	0–1	0–1	2–2	1–2	2–0	0–1	1–0	0–1	1–2	3–4	4–0	0–2	1–0	1–0	0–1		1–1	1–2
Srem	2–0	0–0	2–0	0–1	0–2	0–0	2–1	0–1	3–0	0–1	1–0	2–0	3–0	1–0	1–1	3–0	1–0	1–1		3–0
Vlasina	2–1	1–1	1–0	1–0	1–0	0–0	0–0	4–0	1–0	2–1	1–0	1–1	3–1	2–1	0–0	2–2	0–1	1–0	1–1	

Legend: Blue = home team win; Yellow = draw; Red = away team win.

== Playoffs ==
=== 3rd to 6th place playoffs ===
First round
6	Radnički Pirot	0	0	0
3	Napredak Kruševac	0	2	2
5	Rad	1	1	2
4	BSK Borča	2	2	4

Final round
4	BSK Borča	2	0	2
3	Napredak Kruševac	1	2	3

=== Promotion playoffs ===
Final round
3	Napredak Kruševac	0	0	0
10 (I)	Borac Čačak	0	1	1

== Top scorers ==
Rank	Scorer	Club	Goals
1	(Serbia) Filip Đorđević	Rad	16
2	(Serbia) Predrag Ilić	Novi Pazar	13
2	(Serbia) Marko Aleksić	Vlasina	13
4	(Serbia) Đorđe Lazić	Mladost Lučani	12
4	(Serbia) Lazar Popović	Čukarički	12
4	(Serbia) Nenad Vasić	Napredak Kruševac	12
7	(Serbia) Rade Veljović	Napredak Kruševac	11
7	(Serbia) Milan Kovačević	Srem	11
7	(Serbia) Mladen Brkić	Mladenovac	11

=== Hat-tricks ===
Player	For	Against	Result	Date
(Serbia) Dejan Bogunović	Mladenovac	Spartak Subotica	3–1	2 September 2006
(Serbia) Altin Grbović	Novi Pazar	Srem	3–1	23 September 2006
(Serbia) Dragan Vulević	Sevojno	Srem	5–1	20 April 2007
(Serbia) Amir Memišević	Spartak Subotica	Novi Pazar	3–4	12 May 2007
(Serbia) Dragan Milovanović	Napredak Kruševac	Spartak Subotica	5–2	19 May 2007
(Serbia) Filip Arsenijević	Sevojno	Inđija	4–1	3 June 2007
