= NK Železničar =

NK Železničar may refer to:

- NK Železničar Ljubljana – former name of NK Ljubljana
- NK Železničar Maribor
- NK Železničar Nova Gorica – former name of ND Gorica

== See also ==
- NK Željezničar (disambiguation)
- FK Železničar (disambiguation)
- FK Željezničar (disambiguation)
