= Niš Zone League =

- Folded: 2014
- Country: Serbia
- Number of clubs: 16 (2010–2014); 18 (2007–2010); 16 (2004–2007); 18 (2002–2004)
- Level on pyramid: 4
- Promotion to: Serbian League East
- Relegation to: Jablanica District League; Niš First League; Nišava District League; Pčinja District League; Pirot District League; Toplica District League
- Domestic cup: Serbian Cup
- Last champions: Radan Lebane (2013–14)

Niš Zone League (Serbian: Нишка зона / Niška zona) was one of the Serbian Zone League divisions, the fourth tier of the Serbian football league system. It was run by the Football Association of East Serbia.

The league folded in 2014, together with the Pomoravlje-Timok Zone League. Three new sections were established instead, namely Zone League East, Zone League South and Zone League West.

== Seasons ==
Season	Winner	Runner-up
2002–03	Jedinstvo Bela Palanka	Balkanski
2003–04	Pukovac	Doljevac
2004–05	Sinđelić Niš	Mramor
2005–06	Svrljig	Napredak Aleksinac
2006–07	Balkanski	Aluminijum Niš
2007–08	Topličanin	Car Konstantin
2008–09	Jedinstvo Bošnjace	Rudar Aleksinac
2009–10	Žitorađa	Vučje
2010–11	Balkanski	Pukovac
2011–12	Moravac Mrštane	Dubočica
2012–13	Moravac Predejane	Sloga Leskovac
2013–14	Radan Lebane	Svrljig
