= FK Morava 1918 =

Serbian football club

Morava 1918
- Full name: Fudbalski Klub Morava 1918
- Founded: 1918; 108 years ago
- Ground: Ćuprija City Stadium, Ćuprija
- Capacity: 10,000
- League: Serbian League East
- 2024–25: Serbian League East, 4th of 16
Home colours	Away colours

FK Morava 1918 (Serbian Cyrillic: ФК Морава 1918) is a football club based in Ćuprija, Serbia. They compete in the Serbian League East, the third tier of the national league system.

== History ==
The club participated in the Second League of Serbia and Montenegro in the 2003–04 season, but suffered relegation to the Serbian League East. After winning the Pomoravlje-Timok Zone League in the 2011–12 season, they were promoted back to the Serbian League East.

=== Recent league history ===
Season	Division	P	W	D	L	F	A	Pts	Pos
2020–21	4 - Zone League West	30	21	4	5	75	27	67	2nd
2021–22	4 - Zone League West	28	19	2	7	67	34	59	3rd
2022–23	4 - Zone League West	28	22	1	5	101	39	67	3rd
2023–24	4 - Zone League West	28	23	5	0	96	20	74	1st
2024–25	3 - Serbian League East	30	15	8	7	49	35	53	4th

== Honours ==
Serbian League Timok (Tier 3)

- 2002–03

Pomoravlje-Timok Zone League (Tier 4)

- 2011–12

Zone League East (Tier 4)

- 2023–24

Pomoravlje District League (Tier 5)

- 2015–16
