= 2007–08 Serbian League West =

Serbian League West
- Season: 2007–08

Serbian League West is a section of the Serbian League, Serbia's third-tier football league. Teams from the western part of Serbia are in this section of the league. The other sections are Serbian League East, Serbian League Vojvodina, and Serbian League Belgrade.

== League table ==
Pos	Team	Pld	W	D	L	GF	GA	GD	Pts	Promotion or relegation
1	Mladi Radnik (C, P)	30	24	5	1	63	17	+46	77	Promotion to the Serbian First League
2	Sloga Kraljevo	30	16	6	8	48	31	+17	54	Qualification for promotion play-offs
3	INON	30	12	9	9	39	28	+11	45	
4	Mačva Šabac	30	12	7	11	30	27	+3	43	
5	Radnički Kragujevac	30	11	10	9	27	24	+3	43	
6	Sloga Petrovac	30	11	9	10	29	32	−3	42	
7	Metalac Kraljevo	30	11	6	13	34	32	+2	39	
8	Jedinstvo Ub	30	9	12	9	29	35	−6	39	
9	Vujić Voda	30	11	5	14	37	40	−3	38	
10	Budućnost Valjevo	30	11	5	14	23	38	−15	38	
11	Sloboda Čačak	30	11	4	15	32	40	−8	37	
12	Sloboda Užice	30	9	8	13	26	30	−4	35	
13	Železničar Lajkovac	30	9	7	14	25	38	−13	34	
14	Morava Velika Plana (R)	30	8	9	13	39	41	−2	33	Qualification for relegation play-offs
15	Sloga Bajina Bašta (R)	30	9	6	15	25	36	−11	33	Relegation to Zone League
16	Šumadija 1903 (R)	30	6	12	12	29	46	−17	30	Relegation to Zone League

(C) Champions; (P) Promoted; (R) Relegated
