= FK Vranjska Banja =

Vranjska Banja
- Full name: Fudbalski Klub Vranjska Banja
- Dissolved: 2021
- Ground: Stadion FK Vranjska Banja
- Capacity: 500
- President: Nenad Mitić
- Head coach: Petar Jeftić
- League: Zone League South
- 2021–22: Zone League South, withdrew
Home colours	Away colours

FK Vranjska Banja (Serbian Cyrillic: ФК Врањска Бања) was a football club from Vranjska Banja, Serbia. The club last competed in the Zone League South, the fourth tier of the national league system.

== History ==
The club participated once in the Serbian League East under the name FK Železničar, finishing in eight place in the 2007–08 season. They were later renamed as FK Vranjska Banja, winning the Pčinja District League in the 2014–15 season.

== Final league seasons ==
Season	Division	P	W	D	L	F	A	Pts	Pos
2018–19	4 - Zone League South	30	13	4	13	65	60	43	8th
2019–20	4 - Zone League South	18	13	2	3	42	29	41	2nd
2020–21	4 - Zone League South	28	11	8	9	45	39	41	9th

== Honours ==
Pčinja District League

- 2014–15
