= FK Ozren Sokobanja =

Ozren
- Full name: Fudbalski Klub Ozren Sokobanja
- Founded: 21 July 1912; 113 years ago
- Ground: Stadion Bata Nole, Sokobanja
- Capacity: 2,000
- Chairman: Đorđe Bajić
- Manager: Marko Bajić
- League: Zaječar District League
- 2024-25: Zaječar District League, 14th
Home colours	Away colours

FK Ozren (Serbian Cyrillic: ФК Озрен) is a Serbian football club from Sokobanja and currently competes in the Zaječar District League, the fifth level of competition of Serbian football. The colors of shirts are dark green, light green and white.

== History ==
This football club was founded on July 21, 1912. FK Ozren through its long history of almost 100 years, went through various periods, has had its ups and downs and the greatest success in the new history of the club, is considered to be entering the third-tier Serbian League East in the 2002/03, 2007/08 and 2013/14 seasons.

=== Recent league history ===
Season	Division	P	W	D	L	F	A	Pts	Pos
2020–21	5 - Zaječar District League	30	24	3	3	111	53	75	1st
2021–22	4 - Zone League East	30	10	0	20	45	86	30	13th
2022–23	4 - Zone League East	28	4	0	24	28	139	11 (Note: The club was docked one point.)	15th
2023–24	7 - Municipal League Sokobanja	14	7	0	7	40	39	21	4th
2024–25	5 - Zaječar District League	25	5	6	14	32	65	21	14th
