= FK Kolubara =

Serbian football club

Kolubara
- Full name: Fudbalski Klub Kolubara
- Nicknames: Rudari (The Miners); Zeleno-crni (The Green-Blacks)
- Founded: 1919; 107 years ago
- Ground: Kolubara Stadium, Lazarevac
- Capacity: 2,540
- President: Dragiša Urošević
- League: Serbian League Belgrade
- 2024–25: Serbian League Belgrade, 5th
Home colours	Away colours

FK Kolubara (Serbian Cyrillic: ФК Колубара) is a professional football club based in Lazarevac, Belgrade, Serbia. They compete in the Serbian League Belgrade, the third tier of the national league system.

== History ==
During the existence of SFR Yugoslavia, the club spent two consecutive seasons in the Second League (1983–84 and 1984–85), but mainly competed in the lower regional leagues. They would make their debut in the second tier of FR Yugoslavia football during the NATO bombing-suspended 1998–99 season, finishing fifth in Group East. The club spent three more years in the Second League (1999–2002), before suffering relegation to the Serbian League Belgrade. They achieved their biggest success by reaching the semi-finals of the 2005–06 Serbia and Montenegro Cup, losing 4–1 away at OFK Beograd. After spending six seasons in the third tier, the club won the 2007–08 Serbian League Belgrade and took promotion to the Serbian First League. They competed in the second tier for the next five years, controversially missing promotion to the top flight in the last round of the 2009–10 Serbian First League, eventually finishing in third place. In the 2020–21 Serbian First League, the club earned promotion to the Serbian SuperLiga for the first time in history. However, after suffering back to back relegations they found themselves back in the third tier in the 2024-25 season.

== Honours ==
- Serbian League Belgrade (tier-III)
  - 2007–08, 2013–14
- Belgrade Zone League (tier-IV)
  - 2003–04

== Seasons ==
Season	League									Cup
Season	Division	Pld	W	D	L	GF	GA	Pts	Pos	Cup
Serbia and Montenegro
1998–99	2 – East	21 (Note: The season was cut short due to the NATO bombing of Yugoslavia.)	11	6	4	47	19	39	5th	—
1999–2000	2 – North	34	14	9	11	43	38	51	8th	—
2000–01	2 – West	34	14	11	9	45	38	53	5th	—
2001–02	2 – West	32	8	8	16	42	53	32	13th	—
2002–03	3 – Belgrade	34	13	6	15	33	46	45	15th	—
2003–04	4 – Belgrade	34	23	7	4	73	27	76	1st	—
2004–05	3 – Belgrade	34	17	6	11	52	37	57	3rd	—
2005–06	3 – Belgrade	38	17	9	12	53	54	60	5th	Semi-finals
Serbia
2006–07	3 – Belgrade	34	24	6	4	74	29	78	2nd	—
2007–08	3 – Belgrade	30	18	7	5	40	18	61	1st	—
2008–09	2	34	10	12	12	33	36	42	11th	—
2009–10	2	34	14	14	6	37	31	56	3rd	Round of 32
2010–11	2	34	9	9	16	33	43	33 (Note: The club was docked three points.)	15th	Round of 16
2011–12	2	34	12	7	15	35	43	43	11th	Round of 16
2012–13	2	34	6	9	19	30	48	27	17th	Round of 32
2013–14	3 – Belgrade	30	17	7	6	47	29	58	1st	Preliminary round
2014–15	2	30	9	11	10	34	43	38	11th	—
2015–16	2	30	11	9	10	29	28	42	7th	Round of 32
2016–17	2	30	7	11	12	28	35	32	13th	Round of 32
2017–18	3 – Belgrade	30	10	9	11	38	46	39	10th	Preliminary round
2018–19	3 – Belgrade	30	20	5	5	69	33	65	3rd (Note: The club was administratively promoted to fill the vacant spot left by Bežanija.)	Round of 32
2019–20	2	30 (Note: The season was shortened due to the COVID-19 pandemic in Serbia.)	13	8	9	35	25	47	5th	—
2020–21	2	34	21	6	7	53	31	69	2nd	Round of 32
2021–22	1	37	14	4	19	42	65	46	10th	Round of 16
2022–23	1	37	11	8	18	28	57	35 (Note: The club was docked six points for match-fixing.)	13th (Note: The club was relegated to the second tier due to multiple irregularities.)	Round of 16
2023–24	2	30	9	9	12	38	40	36	12th	Round of 32
2024–25	3 – Belgrade	26	11	7	8	31	23	40	5th	Preliminary Round

== Players ==
=== First-team squad ===
As of 2 January 2026

Note: Flags indicate national team as defined under FIFA eligibility rules; some limited exceptions apply. Players may hold more than one non-FIFA nationality.

No.	Pos.	Nation	Player
—	FW	SRB	Aleksandar Blagojević
—		SRB	Mihailo Ignjatović
—	MF	SRB	Saša Jović
—		SRB	Milan Jovičić
—		SRB	Ognjen Kitanović
—		SRB	Uroš Košanin
—		SRB	Stefan Marković
—		SRB	Vuk Marković
—		SRB	Miloš Perišić

No.	Pos.	Nation	Player
—	DF	SRB	Danijel Petković
—		SRB	Ognjen Petrović
—		SRB	Vukašin Radivojević
—	GK	SRB	Mateja Radosavljević
—		SRB	Dušan Rosić
—	DF	SRB	Nemanja Stojanović
—	DF	SRB	Nikola Stojanović
—		SRB	Marko Stojisavljević
—		SRB	Veljko Švabić

=== Notable players ===
This is a list of players who have played at full international level.

- (Bosnia and Herzegovina) Damir Sadiković
- (Croatia) Ante Vukušić
- (Montenegro) Nemanja Nikolić
- (North Macedonia) Dragan Čadikovski
- (Serbia) Marko Grujić
- (Serbia) Saša Jovanović
- (Serbia) Nemanja Matić
- (Serbia) Bogdan Mladenović
- (Serbia) Marko Mrkić
- (Serbia) Dragan Rosić
- (Serbia and Montenegro) Saša Kovačević
- (Serbia and Montenegro) Radovan Radaković
- (Serbia and Montenegro) Zoran Ranković
- (Serbia and Montenegro) Nikola Trajković
- (Serbia and Montenegro) (Serbia) Nikola Žigić
- (Serbia and Montenegro) Saša Zorić

For a list of all FK Kolubara players with a Wikipedia article, see Category:FK Kolubara players.

== Historical list of coaches ==
- (Socialist Federal Republic of Yugoslavia) Mane Bajić (1973-1987)
- (Socialist Federal Republic of Yugoslavia) Mane Bajić (1989-1993)
- (Bosnia and Herzegovina) Nikola Nikić (1998-2000)
- (Federal Republic of Yugoslavia) Milan Milanović (2000-2001)
- (Serbia) Goran Nikić (2004-2005)
- (Serbia) Borislav Raduka (2005-2006)
- (Serbia) Marjan Živković (2008)
- (Serbia) Zoran Milinković (2008)
- (Serbia) Dragan Grčić (2009–2010)
- (Serbia) Nebojša Maksimović (2010)
- (Serbia) Dragan Grčić (2010–2012)
- (Bosnia and Herzegovina) Vinko Marinović (2012)
- (Serbia) Dražen Dukić (2012)
- (Serbia) Radovan Radaković (2013)
- (Bosnia and Herzegovina) Dragan Radović (2013)
- (Serbia) Vladimir Pantelić (2013–2014)
- (Serbia) Predrag Ristanović (2014)
- (Serbia) Veroljub Dukanac (2015)
- (Serbia) Zoran Govedarica (2015)
- (Serbia) Dejan Nikolić (2015–2016)
- (Serbia) Branislav Bajić & (Serbia) Milan Kuljić (2016–2017)
- (Serbia) Bogdan Korak (2017)
- (Serbia) Veroljub Dukanac (2017)
- (Serbia) Marko Milovanović (2017)
- (Serbia) Dragan Grčić (2017–2018)
- (Serbia) Veroljub Dukanac (2018–2019)
- (Serbia) Slađan Nikolić (2019)
- (Serbia) Zoran Milinković (2019–2020)
- (Serbia) Dejan Nikolić (2020)
- (Serbia) Zoran Milinković (2020–2021)
- (Montenegro) Dragan Radojičić (2021)
- (Serbia) Dejan Đurđević (2021–2022)
- (Serbia) Veroljub Dukanac (2022)
- (Serbia) Dejan Đurđević (2022)
- (Serbia) Veroljub Dukanac (2022– Aug 2023)
- (Serbia) Nenad Mijailović (2023)
- (Serbia) Sava Šašić (2023–2024)
- (Serbia) Igor Savić (2024)
- (Serbia) Dragan Grčić (2024-)
