= FK Žitorađa =

Serbian football club

Žitorađa
- Full name: Fudbalski Klub Žitorađa
- Founded: 1957; 69 years ago
- Ground: Stadion FK Žitorađa
- Capacity: 4,000
- League: Zone League South
- 2024–25: Zone League South, 9th
Home colours	Away colours

FK Žitorađa (Serbian Cyrillic: ФК Житорађа) is a football club based in Žitorađa, Serbia. They compete in the Zone League South, the fourth tier of the national league system.

== History ==
The club made its Second League of FR Yugoslavia debut in 2000. They spent three seasons in the second tier, before being relegated to the Serbian League East in 2003. The club won the Zone League South in the 2022–23 season and got promoted to the Serbian League East, returning to the third tier after nine years.

== Honours ==
Niš Zone League / Zone League South (Tier 4)

- 2009–10 / 2022–23

== Recent league history ==
Season	Division	P	W	D	L	F	A	Pts	Pos
2020–21	4 - Zone League South	28	14	4	10	57	44	45	4th
2021–22	4 - Zone League South	26	16	4	6	61	29	52	2nd
2022–23	4 - Zone League South	28	19	2	7	85	41	59	1st
2023–24	3 - Serbian League East	30	3	2	25	21	100	11	16th
2024–25	4 - Zone League South	27	10	7	10	48	46	37	9th
