= FK Beograd (Serbia) =

Serbian football club

Beograd
- Full name: Fudbalski Klub Beograd
- Founded: 1929
- Dissolved: 2012
- Ground: Stadion FK Beograd
- Capacity: 1,000
- 2011–12: Serbian League Belgrade, 12th of 16
Home colours	Away colours

FK Beograd (Serbian Cyrillic: ФК Београд) was a football club based in Karaburma, Belgrade, Serbia.

== History ==
After winning the Belgrade Zone League in the 1993–94 season, the club finished as runners-up in the 1994–95 Serbian League North and earned promotion to the Second League of FR Yugoslavia via the play-offs. They were placed 16th in their debut season in the second tier. In the 1999–2000 season, the club placed first in the Second League of FR Yugoslavia (Group North), but ceded its 2000–01 First League of FR Yugoslavia spot to Sartid Smederevo. They instead spent the next four seasons in the second tier, before suffering relegation in 2004. Over the following eight years, the club participated in the Serbian League Belgrade. They finished runners-up in the 2005–06 season. In July 2012, it was announced that FK Beograd failed to renew its registration, while a new club was founded as FK Beograd 1929.

== Honours ==
Second League of FR Yugoslavia (Tier 2)

- 1999–2000 (Group North)

Belgrade Zone League (Tier 4)

- 1993–94

== Seasons ==
Season	League									Cup
Season	Division	Pld	W	D	L	GF	GA	Pts	Pos	Cup
Serbia and Montenegro
1992–93	4 – Belgrade	30	9	8	13	37	42	26	10th	—
1993–94	4 – Belgrade	34	29	4	1	94	25	62	1st	—
1994–95	3 – North	34	23	8	3	72	30	77	2nd	—
1995–96	2 – II/B	18	6	4	8	20	24	22	6th	—
1995–96	2 – II/B	18	7	3	8	17	19	30	6th	—
1996–97	2 – East	34	13	8	13	34	42	47	10th	—
1997–98	2 – East	34	15	7	12	53	41	52	10th	—
1998–99	2 – East	21 (Note: The season was cut short due to the NATO bombing of Yugoslavia.)	6	5	10	29	33	23	14th	—
1999–2000	2 – North	34	22	6	6	65	35	72	1st (Note: The club gave up on promotion to the First League of FR Yugoslavia.)	—
2000–01	2 – East	34	16	5	13	83	60	53	7th	—
2001–02	2 – East	34	14	10	10	74	51	52	9th	—
2002–03	2 – East	33	12	12	9	58	43	48	6th	—
2003–04	2 – East	36	16	6	14	62	50	54	7th	—
2004–05	3 – Belgrade	34	15	7	12	49	48	52	8th	—
2005–06	3 – Belgrade	38	24	3	11	70	46	75	2nd	—
Serbia
2006–07	3 – Belgrade	34	14	15	5	45	29	57	4th	—
2007–08	3 – Belgrade	30	13	10	7	36	22	49	4th	—
2008–09	3 – Belgrade	30	11	4	15	38	39	37	6th	—
2009–10	3 – Belgrade	30	10	10	10	30	31	40	7th	—
2010–11	3 – Belgrade	29	11	5	13	32	35	38	12th	—
2011–12	3 – Belgrade	30	11	3	16	28	43	36	12th	—

== Notable players ==
This is a list of players who have played at full international level.

- (Bosnia and Herzegovina) Mario Božić
- (Serbia) Branislav Jovanović
- (Serbia) Miloš Simonović
- (Serbia and Montenegro) Nenad Mladenović
- (Slovakia) Boris Sekulić

For a list of all FK Beograd players with a Wikipedia article, see Category:FK Beograd (Serbia) players.

== Managerial history ==
Period	Name
2004	(Serbia and Montenegro) Milan Đuričić
2011-2012	(Serbia) Nebojša Petrović
	(Serbia) Boško Vukojević
	(Serbia) Branko Vojinović
