= FK Dinamo Vranje =

Serbian football club

Dinamo Vranje
- Full name: Fudbalski klub Dinamo Vranje
- Founded: 24 January 1947; 79 years ago
- Dissolved: 2022
- Ground: Stadion Yumco
- Capacity: 2,700
- 2022–23: Pčinja District League (expelled)
Home colours	Away colours

FK Dinamo Vranje (Serbian Cyrillic: ФК Динамо Врање) was a football club based in Vranje, Serbia.

== History ==
After spending 12 consecutive seasons in the third tier, the club won the Serbian League East and took promotion to the Serbian First League in 2006. They thus reached the second tier for the first time in their history. However, the club was promptly relegated back to the third tier. They managed to win a second promotion to the Serbian First League in 2008. Over the next three years, the club competed in the second tier of Serbian football, before being relegated back to the Serbian League East in 2011.

After dropping to the Niš Zone League in 2013, the club was promoted back to the Serbian League East in 2014 and subsequently to the Serbian First League in 2015. They spent the following three years in the second tier, finishing runners-up in the 2017–18 season and gaining promotion to the Serbian SuperLiga for the first time in their history. However, the club failed to avoid relegation in its debut appearance in the top flight after losing to Inđija in the playoffs. They spent the next two seasons in the Serbian First League, before suffering relegation to the Serbian League East in 2021. In February 2022, during the winter break, the club withdrew from the league.

== Honours ==
- Serbian League East (tier 3)
- Champions (3): 2005–06, 2007–08, 2014–15

== Seasons ==
Season	League									Cup
Season	Division	Pld	W	D	L	GF	GA	Pts	Pos	Cup
Serbia and Montenegro
1994–95	3 – East	34	15	6	13	48	32	51	6th	—
1995–96	3 – Niš	34	14	4	16	45	47	46	8th	—
1996–97	3 – Niš	34	17	5	12	63	46	56	3rd	—
1997–98	3 – Niš	34	14	5	15	52	64	47	8th	—
1998–99	3 – Niš	17 (Note: The season was cut short due to the NATO bombing of Yugoslavia.)	–	–	–	–	–	25	9th	—
1999–2000	3 – Niš	38	16	8	14	57	49	56	8th	—
2000–01	3 – Niš	33	13	7	13	56	50	46	13th	—
2001–02	3 – Niš	34	14	7	13	48	41	49	7th	—
2002–03	3 – Niš	34	19	6	9	66	41	63	5th	—
2003–04	3 – East	34	15	8	11	52	46	53	8th	—
2004–05	3 – East	34	16	7	11	56	44	55	7th	—
2005–06	3 – East	34	25	7	2	68	26	82	1st	—
Serbia
2006–07	2	38	10	15	13	33	37	45	16th	—
2007–08	3 – East	30	19	8	3	57	21	65	1st	—
2008–09	2	34	9	12	13	36	39	39	13th	—
2009–10	2	34	12	7	15	32	38	43	13th	Round of 32
2010–11	2	34	7	5	22	23	65	26	18th	Preliminary round
2011–12	3 – East	30	12	5	13	35	38	41	9th	Preliminary round
2012–13	3 – East	30	9	4	17	38	50	31	15th	—
2013–14	4 – Niš	30	19	1	10	73	38	55 (Note: The club was docked three points for fielding ineligible players.)	3rd (Note: The club was administratively promoted to fill the vacant spot left by Moravac Predejane.)	—
2014–15	3 – East	30	21	2	7	57	30	65	1st	—
2015–16	2	30	11	5	14	27	38	38	12th	—
2016–17	2	30	10	9	11	33	43	39	8th	Round of 32
2017–18	2	30	20	3	7	47	24	63	2nd	Round of 32
2018–19	1	37	9	6	22	24	67	23	14th	Round of 32
2019–20	2	30 (Note: The season was shortened due to the COVID-19 pandemic in Serbia.)	10	7	13	34	38	37	11th	Round of 32
2020–21	2	34	11	5	18	39	53	38	13th	Round of 32
2021–22	3 – East	— (Note: The club withdrew from the league during the winter break.)								Round of 32
2022–23	5 – Pčinja	17	5	6	6	37	35	21 (Note: The club was expelled from the league during the second half of the season.)	—	

== Notable players ==
This is a list of players who have played at full international level.

- (Bosnia and Herzegovina) Admir Aganović
- (Montenegro) Janko Simović
- (North Macedonia) Ostoja Stjepanović
- (Serbia) Dušan Petronijević
- (Serbia) Lazar Ranđelović
- (Serbia) Vojislav Stanković
- (Serbia) Nikola Stevanović
- (Socialist Federal Republic of Yugoslavia) Miroslav Vardić
- (Federal Republic of Yugoslavia) Dejan Osmanović

For a list of all FK Dinamo Vranje players with a Wikipedia article, see Category:FK Dinamo Vranje players.

== Managerial history ==
Period	Name
	(Serbia and Montenegro) Ivan Jovanović
2006–2007	(Bosnia and Herzegovina) Slobodan Halilović
2007–2008	(Serbia) Nebojša Maksimović
2008–2009	(Serbia) Mladen Dodić
2009	(Serbia) Miljojko Gošić
2009–2010	(Serbia) Radmilo Jovanović
2010	(Serbia) Miroslav Knežević
2010	(Serbia) Mile Vuletić
2010	(Serbia) Predrag Pršić
2011	(Serbia) Aleksandar Antić
2011–2012	(Serbia) Davor Tasić
2012	(Serbia) Srđan Paunović
2013	(Serbia) Siniša Stančić
2013–2014	(Serbia) Ivan Jovanović

Period	Name
2014	(Serbia) Milan Dimoski
2015	(Serbia) Vladimir Pantelić
2015	(Serbia) Saša Štrbac
2015	(Serbia) Miodrag Radanović
2015–2016	(Serbia) Vladan Petrović
2016	(Serbia) Saša Mrkić
2016–2018	(Serbia) Dragan Antić
2018	(Serbia) Radmilo Jovanović
2018–2019	(Serbia) Dragan Antić
2019	(Serbia) Uroš Kalinić
2019	(Serbia) Radmilo Jovanović
2019–2021	(Serbia) Dragan Antić
2021	(Serbia) Saša Jovanović
2022	(Serbia) Nebojša Vučićević
