= OFK Niš =

Serbian football club

- Full name: Omladinski Fudbalski Klub Niš
- Nickname: Romantičari sa Panteleja (The Romantics from Pantelej)
- Founded: 1969; 57 years ago
- Ground: Stadion OFK, Niš
- Head coach: Aleksandar Simov
- League: Zone League Centre
- 2024–25: Zone League Centre, 5th of 12
- Website: Official
Home colours	Away colours

OFK Niš (Serbian Cyrillic: ОФК Ниш) is a football club based in Niš, Serbia. They compete in the Zone League Centre, the fourth tier of the national league system.

== History ==
Founded in 1969, the club made its Second League of FR Yugoslavia debut in the 1999–2000 season, placing fifth in Group East. They achieved their best result by finishing as runners-up in 2004. After that, the club would remain in the second tier for two more years until 2006. They subsequently spent two seasons in the Serbian League East from 2006 to 2008, before suffering relegation to the Niš Zone League. In 2019, the club marked its 50th anniversary.

=== Recent league history ===
Season	Division	P	W	D	L	F	A	Pts	Pos
2020–21	4 - Zone League Centre	26	9	5	12	40	38	32	9th
2021–22	4 - Zone League Centre	30	11	8	11	38	44	41	6th
2022–23	4 - Zone League Centre	30	11	6	13	44	50	39	13th
2023–24	4 - Zone League Centre	30	13	4	13	75	45	43	10th
2024–25	4 - Zone League Centre	27	11	7	9	50	48	40	5th

== Honours ==
- Serbian League Niš (Tier 3)
  - 1998–99
- Niš First League (Tier 5)
  - 2016–17

== Notable players ==
This is a list of players who have played at full international level.

- (Uganda) Timothy Batabaire

For a list of all OFK Niš players with a Wikipedia article, see Category:OFK Niš players.
