= FK Napredak Kruševac =

Association football club in Kruševac, Serbia

Napredak Kruševac
- Full name: Fudbalski Klub Napredak Kruševac
- Nickname: Čarapani (The socks man)
- Founded: 8 December 1946; 79 years ago
- Ground: Mladost Stadium
- Capacity: 10,331
- President: Miloš Nenezić
- Head coach: Saša Mićović
- League: Serbian First League
- 2025–26: Serbian SuperLiga, 16th of 16 (relegated)
- Website: fknapredak.rs
Home colours	Away colours	Third colours

Fudbalski klub Napredak Kruševac (Serbian Cyrillic: Фудбалски клуб Напредак Крушевац), commonly known as Napredak Kruševac, is a Serbian professional football club based in the city of Kruševac. They compete in the Serbian First League the second tier of the national league system. The word Napredak means "progress" in Serbian.

The club's nickname is the Čarapani which translates in English to the sock-men, the origin of this nickname are from the times of the First Serbian Uprising, when the local insurgents took off their slippers and silently went to defend their homeland against the Ottoman occupation of Serbia, in socks. Another interpretation is related to the custom of men in this area who in urban legend in medieval times wore beautiful, long embroidered socks.

== History ==
Napredak was founded on 8 December 1946, through the merger of three local area clubs Zakić, Badža and 14. Oktobar. In January 1947, they played their first official game against Vardar, the result was 1–1. The first goal in Napredak's history was scored by Marko Valok, who later became a famous player for Partizan Belgrade and Yugoslavian First League top scorer in 1950. In 1949, they became champions of Serbia, the first title of the club. In 1951, Napredak joined the Yugoslav First League for the first time, but they immediately relegated in the IV Zona (IV Zone), which was one of the 5 subdivisions of the Yugoslav Second League. Since the season 1958/59, they compete in the new format of the Yugoslav Second League.

In 1976, led by coach Dragan Bojović, the club won the second league and again provides a placement in the elite, thanks to the four goals by Jovica Škoro, three by Milomir Jakovljević and one by Dragiša Ćuslović, which brought the decisive 8–2 victory over Rad Belgrade, but they relegated again in the same season. In the season 1978–79, they joined the Yugoslav First League, and in that season, Yugoslav powerhouse Partizan suffered a sensational 3–0 home defeat from Napredak. In the season 1979–80, led by coach Tomislav Kaloperović, Napredak finished the championship as 4th and this in front of several Yugoslav top clubs, and qualified finally for the first time for a European competition, the 1980–81 UEFA Cup season, but they were eliminated already in the first round by Eastern Germany's club Dynamo Dresden. It got even worse, because in the same season the club finished the league unexpectedly in the last place and relegated to the Yugoslav Second League and competed there until 1988. In the season 1987–88, Napredak won the East Division of the second league and was promoted to the top tier, but the club could not keep in the first league and relegated for the third time in its history again in the debut season. Napredak remain in the second league until the season 1991–92, the last season of the Socialist Federal Republic of Yugoslavia, and was one of the clubs, which were member of the newly founded First League of the Federal Republic of Yugoslavia. In 1993, Napredak achieved a good six place, but the subsequent 1993–94 season, they relegated to the second league.

=== New Millennium (2000–2010) ===
They were during the nineties on the border between the first and second league and won finally in the season 1999–2000 the group East of the Yugoslav Second League and returned to the top tier. In the same season, Napredak's achieved its biggest success in a domestic competition, the reaching of the Yugoslav Cup final in 2000, but lost against the Serbian giant Red Star Belgrade. Their presence in the national cup final earned them a spot for the 2000–01 UEFA Cup season. This time, the team had a little more success than the first participation, eliminating Estonia's Viljandi Tulevik in the first round, but getting eliminated in the second by Greek club OFI. The first league debut for the season 2000–01 was again, after the club history almost traditional, not a successful season and they relegated again immediately. The club received slowly the reputation to be an elevator team due to the frequent promotions and subsequent relegations. In 2003, Federal Republic of Yugoslavia was renamed to Serbia and Montenegro and the football leagues followed the renaming. In 2003, Napredak won the group East of the Second League of Serbia and Montenegro and promoted to the 2003–04 First League of Serbia and Montenegro season, but relegated again immediately, and this already in total for the fifth time in its history immediately after a promotion.

After Montenegrin independence in 2006, the clubs from Montenegro withdrew from the league and since then the leagues formed by clubs from the territory of Serbia only. In the season 2006–07, Napredak achieved the third place of the Serbian First League, the second tier in the Serbian football system. Then provided the first two places the promotion in the first league, but on 19 July, in 2007, the Football Association of Serbia decided that Napredak will be promoted to the Serbian SuperLiga and replace Mladost Apatin who withdrew from the competition after being unable to bear the financial burden of playing in a top division. In 2008, they missed barely a qualification place for the 2008–09 UEFA Cup. However, two years later, precisely in 2010, Napredak relegated and played again in the Serbian First League.

=== New Management (2011–present) ===
Napredak began transforming from the beginning of 2012 with the arrival of new management and players alike. One of the players was striker Nenad Mirosavljević, one of the best known player in the Serbian football and one of the greatest players to have ever played for APOEL, who was signed from Olympiakos Nicosia. Less than a month after his signing, the club brought the new director Goran Karić, who had the task of bringing the club back to the top flight from the Serbian First League.

Napredak occupied after the first half of the season the bottom half of table, but the new team started a series of victories and they finished the 2011–12 Serbian First League season as 6th, barely missing promotion to the first-tier, the Serbian SuperLiga. On 17 September 2012, Karić was replaced by new director Vladimir Arsić. One of the first acts under the new management was the redesign of the club's logo. The renovation of Napredak's home ground, the Madost Stadium, was complete by the end of April 2012, and the club was able to play again at home. On 9 December, in 2012, Napredak celebrated its 66th birthday and the club's position at first place at the end of the first half of the 2012–13 Serbian First League, which was practically an unprecedented success for the club. Napredak finally promoted to Serbian SuperLiga after crowning First League as champions. Napredak finished SuperLiga as 9th in 2013–14 season. But, Napredak finished it as 14th in 2014–15 season and played play-out against Metalac, 3rd of Serbian First League. After a 3–1 loss away on 30 May 2015 and a 1–1 draw at home on 3 June 2015, Napredak were relegated to second tier.

== Club colors and crest ==
Throughout its history Napredak has traditionally performed in the color red as a tribute to the Labour movement, but the club used also as away kit, an all-white jersey. The crest includes the colors red and white, as well as the year 1946 marking the year the club was established, a football in the middle and the top symbolizes the wall of the Kruševac Fortress, which is believed to have been built by Serbian medieval ruler, Tsar Lazar.

== Stadium ==
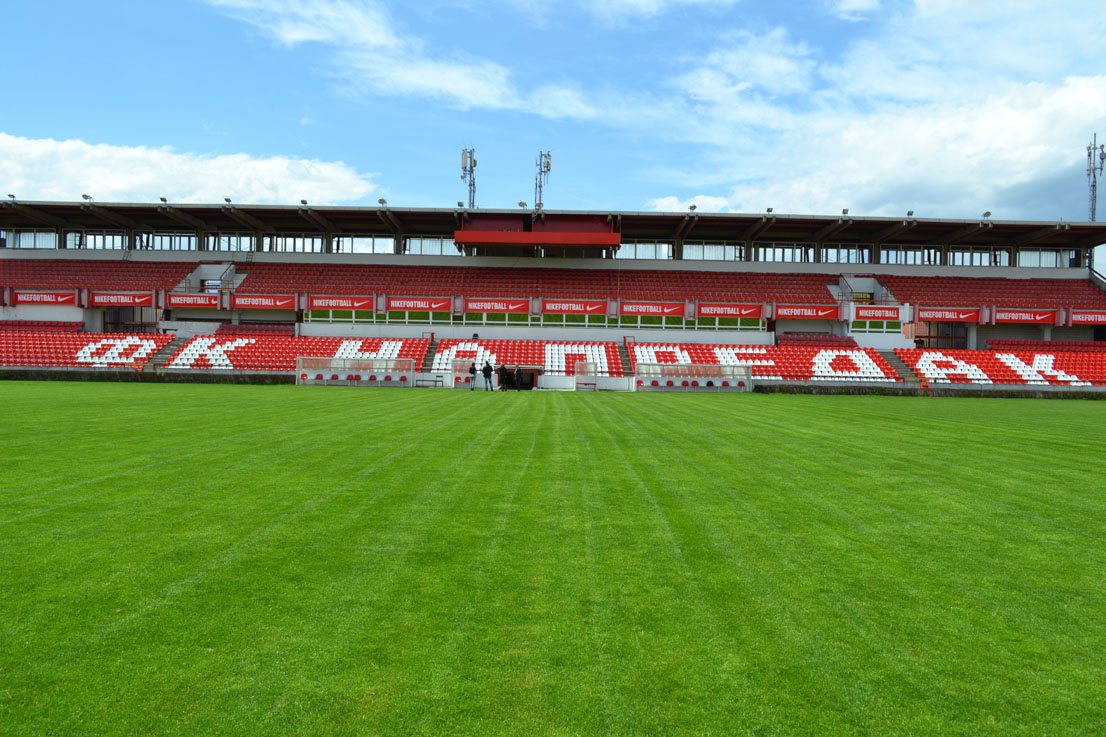
Mladost Stadium

The home field of Napredak is the Mladost Stadium, an all-seater football stadium, which has capacity for 10,331 people. The ground was built in 1976, in a record time of just 60 days, with initial capacity being of 25,000. it is one of the few single-purpose stadiums in Serbia, because it lacks a track ring like in conventional multi-purpose stadiums, noise from the spectators is closer to the field and therefore composes a louder and exciting atmosphere for hosting and visiting teams alike. In 2012 Napredak carried out an extensive renovation project, installing seats throughout the stadium and erecting four floodlight masts. That year the stadium hosted the 2012 Serbian Cup Final and is also one of the venues for the Serbian national under-21 football team.

== Supporters ==
The organized supporters group of Napredak are known as Jakuza, which was formed in 1988. They are in a brotherhood with the organized supporter group of Mačva Šabac, the Šaneri.

People from Kruševac and district are supporting Napredak and all, are known as Čarapani. Song name "Svake noći tebe sanjam" and the chant "Samo napred Čarapani!", meaning "Long live socks wearing man".

== Honours ==
=== Domestic ===
==== League ====
- Yugoslav Second League
  - Winners (4): 1957–58 (zone IV), 1975−76 (east), 1977−78 (east), 1987–88 (east)
- Second League of Serbia and Montenegro
  - Winners (2): 1999–2000, 2002–03
- Serbian First League
  - Winners (2): 2012–13, 2015–16

==== Cups ====
- Serbia and Montenegro Cup
  - Runners-up (1): 1999–2000

== Recent league history ==
Season	Division	P	W	D	L	F	A	Pts	Pos
2006–07	Div 2	38	19	8	11	52	38	65	3rd
2007–08	Div 1	30	11	8	14	25	33	41	5th
2008–09	Div 1	30	10	8	15	28	37	38	6th
2009–10	Div 1	30	7	8	15	30	44	29	15th
2010–11	Div 2	34	13	10	11	35	32	49	6th
2011–12	Div 2	34	13	12	9	39	29	51	6th
2012–13	Div 2	34	25	5	4	74	25	80	1st
2013–14	Div 1	30	9	8	13	42	44	35	9th
2014–15	Div 1	30	8	7	15	23	34	31	14th
2015–16	Div 2	30	21	5	4	48	26	68	1st
2016–17	Div 1	37	16	8	13	44	36	56	6th
2017–18	Div 1	30	13	7	10	49	42	46	7th
2018–19	Div 1	37	12	12	13	46	50	28	6th
2019–20	Div 1	30	9	6	15	33	41	33	10th
2020–21	Div 1	38	14	8	16	44	51	50	11th
2021–22	Div 1	37	10	8	19	31	51	38	8th
2022–23	Div 1	37	10	9	18	27	37	39	9th
2023–24	Div 1	37	11	7	19	36	66	40	8th
2024–25	Div 1	37	11	9	17	35	48	42	14th

== European record ==
1R = First round, PR = Preliminary round, QR = Qualifying round, PO = play-off round.

Season	Competition	Round	Opponent	Home	Away	Aggregate
1980–81	UEFA Cup	1R	(Germany) Dynamo Dresden	0–1	0–1	0–2
2000–01	UEFA Cup	QR	(Estonia) JK Viljandi Tulevik	5–1	1–1	6–2
2000–01	UEFA Cup	1R	(Greece) OFI	0–0	0–6	0–6

== Players ==
=== Current squad ===
As of 20 July 2026

Note: Flags indicate national team as defined under FIFA eligibility rules; some limited exceptions apply. Players may hold more than one non-FIFA nationality.

No.	Pos.	Nation	Player
1	GK	SRB	Lazar Balević (captain)
2	DF	SRB	Nikola Janković
4	MF	SRB	Filip Krstić
6	DF	SRB	Strahinja Ristić
7	FW	SRB	Petar Bogdanović
8	MF	SRB	Damjan Jovanović
9	FW	SRB	Filip Stuparević
10	MF	SRB	Andrija Luković
11	DF	SRB	Stefan Milošević
14	MF	SRB	Luka Laban
15	DF	SRB	Milan Mitrović
16	FW	SRB	Đorđe Skočajić
17	DF	BIH	Andrej Vlaisavljević
18	MF	SRB	Novak Stevanović
19	GK	SRB	Aleksa Đorđević

No.	Pos.	Nation	Player
20	DF	SRB	Nikola Marinković
22	DF	SRB	Aleksandar Andrejević
23	MF	SRB	Andrija Milić
24	DF	SRB	Damjan Daničić
44	DF	SRB	Lazar Miladinović
55	FW	SRB	Đorđe Kotlajić
70	MF	SRB	Aleksa Novaković
77	DF	SRB	Luka Drobnjak
84	GK	SRB	Filip Novaković
88	FW	SRB	Petar Gigić
89	MF	SRB	Andrej Smiljković
91	DF	SRB	Jovan Stefanović
99	FW	SRB	Andrej Stamenković
—	GK	SRB	Nemanja Stevanović
—	FW	SRB	Mateja Bubanj

=== Out on loan ===
Note: Flags indicate national team as defined under FIFA eligibility rules; some limited exceptions apply. Players may hold more than one non-FIFA nationality.

No.	Pos.	Nation	Player

== Club officials ==
Current technical staff
Position	Name
Head coach	(Serbia) Saša Mićović
Assistant coach	(Serbia) Goran Serafimović
Assistant coach	(Serbia) Bojan Ostojić
Fitness coach	(Serbia) Duško Ljubičić
Goalkeeper coach	(Serbia) Milan Ševo
Doctor	(Serbia) Daniel Tomićević
Physiotherapist	(Serbia) Saša Miletić
Physiotherapist	(Serbia) Svetomir Tomić
Physiotherapist	(Serbia) Bogdan Kostić
Technical staff secretary	(Serbia) Zoran Ristić
Kit manager	(Serbia) Veroljub Lazarević
Kit manager	(Serbia) Saša Miladinović
Source: FK Napredak

== Notable former players ==
List of former players with senior national team appearances:

Domestic:

- (Socialist Federal Republic of Yugoslavia) Dragiša Binić
- (Serbia) Vladimir Dišljenković
- (Socialist Federal Republic of Yugoslavia) Vladimir Durković
- (Socialist Federal Republic of Yugoslavia) Vladislav Đukić
- (Serbia) Marko Gobeljić
- (Serbia) Bratislav Punoševac
- (Serbia and Montenegro) Ivan Gvozdenović
- (Socialist Federal Republic of Yugoslavia) Ešef Jašarević
- (Serbia) Branislav Jovanović
- (Serbia and Montenegro) Radivoje Manić
- (Serbia and Montenegro) Jovan Markoski
- (Socialist Federal Republic of Yugoslavia) Zoran Martinović
- (Serbia) Dušan Petronijević
- (Socialist Federal Republic of Yugoslavia) Dušan Pešić
- (Socialist Federal Republic of Yugoslavia) Nebojša Rudić
- (Socialist Federal Republic of Yugoslavia) Zoran Simović
- (Socialist Federal Republic of Yugoslavia) Milijan Tupajić
- (Socialist Federal Republic of Yugoslavia) Marko Valok
- (Serbia) Bojan Zajić
- (Serbia) Miloš Vulić
- (Serbia) Aleksa Vukanović

Foreign:

- (Russia) Daur Kvekveskiri
- (Bosnia and Herzegovina) Ognjen Vranješ
- (Estonia) Mark Oliver Roosnupp
- (Ghana) Yaw Antwi
- (Hong Kong) Dejan Antonić
- (North Macedonia) Stefan Aškovski
- (North Macedonia) Vlade Lazarevski
- (Montenegro) Vladimir Jovović
- (Montenegro) Filip Kasalica
- (Slovenia) Marko Simeunovič
- (Senegal) Ibrahima N'Diaye

For the list of all current and former players with Wikipedia article, please see Category:FK Napredak Kruševac players.

== Kit manufacturers and shirt sponsors ==
Period	Kit Manufacturer	Shirt Sponsor
2008–2009	Kappa	City of Kruševac
2009–2011	Kappa	None
2011–2012	Nike	None
2013–2014	Nike	None
2014–2015	Hummel	None
2015–2018	Puma	Gala
2018–	Givova	MTS
