= FK Sloga Leskovac =

Serbian football club

Sloga Leskovac
- Full name: Fudbalski Klub Sloga Leskovac
- Founded: 1946; 80 years ago
- Ground: Stadion FK Sloga
- Capacity: 2,000
- President: Aleksandar Đorđeviċ
- League: Serbian League East
- 2024–25: Zone League South, 1st of 12 (promoted)
Home colours	Away colours

FK Sloga Leskovac (Serbian Cyrillic: ФК Слога Лесковац) is a football club based in Leskovac, Serbia. They compete in the Serbian League East, the third tier of the national league system.

== History ==
After winning the South Morava Zone League in 2005, the club played in the Serbian League East until 2008. They would spend 13 consecutive seasons in the fourth tier, including six in the Niš Zone League and seven in the Zone League South, before returning to the Serbian League East in 2021.

=== Recent league history ===
Season	Division	P	W	D	L	F	A	Pts	Pos
2020–21	4 - Zone League South	28	19	6	3	74	26	63	1st
2021–22	3 - Serbian League East	28	1	3	24	18	75	6	15th
2022–23	4 - Zone League South	28	16	7	5	79	44	55	2nd
2023–24	4 - Zone League South	34	19	4	11	104	64	61	6th
2024–25	4 - Zone League South	27	21	3	3	105	24	66	1st

== Honours ==
South Morava Zone League / Zone League South (Tier 4)

- 2004–05 / 2020–21
