= Serbian League East =

- Founded: 2003
- Country: (Serbia and Montenegro) (2003–2006) (Serbia) (2006–present)
- Confederation: UEFA
- Number of clubs: 16
- Level on pyramid: 3
- Promotion to: Serbian First League
- Relegation to: Zone League Centre; Zone League East; Zone League South; Zone League West
- Domestic cup: Serbian Cup
- Current champions: Bor (2025–26)
- Most championships: Dinamo Vranje, Radnički Pirot (3 titles)
- Website: fsris.org.rs
- Current: 2025–26

Serbian League East (Serbian: Српска лига Исток / Srpska liga Istok) is one of four sections of the Serbian League, third tier of professional football in Serbia. The other three sections are Serbian League Belgrade, Serbian League Vojvodina and Serbian League West. It is also the highest regional league for the eastern part of Serbia.

The league was founded in 2003 following a merger between the Serbian League Niš and the Serbian League Timok.

== Format ==
The league is formed by 16 clubs which play all against one another twice, once at home, once away. Champion Serbian League East goes to Serbian First League. From Serbian League East relegated 3 teams in Zone Leagues.

== Winners ==
Season	Winner	Runner-up
Serbia and Montenegro
2003–04	Kosanica	Dubočica
2004–05	Radnički Pirot	Železničar Niš
2005–06	Dinamo Vranje	Sinđelić Niš
Serbia
2006–07	Jagodina	Železničar Niš
2007–08	Dinamo Vranje	Sinđelić Niš
2008–09	Radnički Niš	Timok
2009–10	Sinđelić Niš	Timok
2010–11	Radnički Niš	Radnički Pirot
2011–12	Timok	Radnički Svilajnac
2012–13	Radnik Surdulica	Sinđelić Niš
2013–14	Moravac Mrštane	Trstenik PPT
2014–15	Dinamo Vranje	Radnički Pirot
2015–16	Radnički Pirot	Tabane 1970
2016–17	Temnić 1924	Moravac Mrštane
2017–18	Trayal	Car Konstantin
2018–19	Radnički Pirot	Temnić 1924
2019–20	Jagodina Tabane	Budućnost Popovac
2020–21	Timok	Budućnost Popovac
2021–22	Trayal	Budućnost Popovac
2022–23	Dubočica	Radnički Pirot
2023–24	Trayal	Sinđelić Niš
2024–25	SU Dinamo Jug	Radnički Pirot
2025–26	Bor 1919	Brzi Brod

== Members for 2026–27 ==
Locations of the 2026–27 Serbian League East clubs
1 Đerdap
2 GFK Jagodina
3 Jedinstvo 1936
4 Malošište
5 Morava 1918
6 OFK Brzi Brod
7 OFK Sinđelić
8 Pčinja
9 Radnički Pirot
10 Radnički Svilajnac
11 Rembas
12 Sloga
13 Timok 1919
14 Timočanin
15 Trayal
16 Vlasina

The following 16 clubs compete in the Serbian League East during the 2026–27 season. Previous-season positions refer to the 2025–26 Serbian League East unless otherwise indicated.

Club	Location	2025–26 position
Đerdap	Kladovo	11th
GFK Jagodina	Jagodina	3rd
Jedinstvo 1936	Kruševac	4th
Malošište	Malošište	1st (Zone Centre)
Morava 1918	Ćuprija	13th
OFK Brzi Brod	Niš	2nd
OFK Sinđelić	Niš	5th
Pčinja	Trgovište	2nd (Zone South)
Radnički Pirot	Pirot	7th
Radnički Svilajnac	Svilajnac	1st (Zone West)
Rembas	Resavica	8th
Sloga	Leskovac	9th
Timok 1919	Zaječar	10th
Timočanin	Knjaževac	1st (Zone East)
Trayal	Kruševac	15th (Serbian First League)
Vlasina	Vlasotince	6th

== Previous seasons ==
=== Relegated teams (from First League to Serbian League East) ===
Season	Clubs
2006–07	Dinamo Vranje
2007–08	Radnički Niš, Vlasina, Radnički Pirot
2008–09	–
2009–10	Radnički Niš
2010–11	Dinamo Vranje
2011–12	Sinđelić Niš
2012–13	–
2013–14	Timok
2014–15	Moravac Mrštane
2015–16	–
2016–17	–
2017–18	Temnić 1924, Radnički Pirot, Jagodina
2018–19	–
2019–20	–
2020–21	Radnički Pirot, Dubočica, Dinamo Vranje, Trayal, Jagodina
2021–22	FK Timok 1919
2022–23	Trayal
2023–24	
2024–25	

=== Relegated teams (from Serbian League East to Zone League) ===
Season	Clubs
2006–07	Kosanica, Đerdap, Car Konstantin, Topličanin, OFK Bor, Jedinstvo Paraćin
2007–08	OFK Niš, Rudar Alpos, Ozren, Sloga Leskovac, Trayal, Morava Vladičin Han
2008–09	Topličanin, Železničar Niš
2009–10	Balkanski, Župa, Jedinstvo Bošnjace
2010–11	Dubočica 1923, Jedinstvo Paraćin, Rudar Alpos
2011–12	Balkanski, Vlasina, Svrljig
2012–13	Borac Bivolje, Dinamo Vranje, Trgovački Jagodina
2013–14	Dubočica 1923, Žitorađa, Jedinstvo Paraćin, SFK Moravac
2014–15	Hajduk Veljko, Đerdap, Kopaonik
2015–16	Timočanin, OFK Bor
2016–17	Sloga Despotovac, Vlasina
2017–18	Tabane 1970, Timok, Ozren

=== Promoted teams (from Zone league to Serbian League East) ===
Season	Clubs
2006–07	Železničar Vranjska Banja, Ozren, Župa, Balkanski
2007–08	Topličanin, Car Konstantin, Radnik Surdulica, Hajduk Veljko, Jedinstvo Paraćin
2008–09	Radnički Svilajnac, Jedinstvo Bošnjace, Rudar Alpos
2009–10	Žitorađa, Sloga Despotovac, Trstenik PPT
2010–11	Trgovački Jagodina, Borac Bivolje, Balkanski
2011–12	Moravac Orion, Dubočica 1923, Morava Ćuprija
2012–13	Timočanin, Đerdap, Jedinstvo Paraćin, SFK Moravac
2013–14	Radan, Dinamo Vranje, OFK Bor, Ozren
2014–15	Temnić 1924, Dunav Prahovo, Jedinstvo Bošnjace
2015–16	Jedinstvo Paraćin, Pukovac, Vlasina
2016–17	Trayal, Rtanj, Budućnost Popovac
2017–18	SFS Borac, Zaplanjac, Dubočica

== All-time table 2006–2016 ==
The following is a list of clubs who have played in the Serbian League East at any time since its formation in 2006 to the current season. Teams playing in the 2015–16 Serbian League East season are indicated in bold. A total of 42 teams have played in the Serbian League East. The table is accurate as of the end of the 2014–15 season.

Pos.	Club	S	P	W	D	L	GF	GA	P	Best result
1.	**Sinđelić Niš**	8	242	**125**	51	66	369	227	**426**	**1.**
2.	**Timok**	8	242	118	57	67	356	223	411	**1.**
3.	**Radnički Pirot**	8	238	119	44	75	372	225	401	**1.**
4.	Kopaonik (-3)	**9**	**272**	106	**58**	108	320	341	373	5.
5.	**Car Konstantin**	**9**	**272**	106	52	**114**	**379**	**388**	370	3.
6.	**Radnički Svilajnac**	7	210	95	28	86	313	298	314	2.
7.	GFK Dubočica (-1)	7	212	89	39	84	288	260	305	3.
8.	Hajduk Veljko	7	208	81	45	82	273	310	288	3.
9.	**Trstenik PPT** (-1)	6	180	76	35	69	230	200	262	2.
10.	Svrljig	6	182	72	34	76	230	238	250	4.
11.	**Sloga Despotovac**	6	180	72	25	83	244	297	241	7.
12.	**Tabane 1970**	5	150	66	31	53	233	176	229	2.
13.	Radnik Surdulica (-1)	5	148	67	28	53	233	194	228	**1.**
14.	Dinamo Vranje	4	120	61	19	40	187	139	202	**1.**
15.	**Jedinstvo Paraćin** (-1)	5	152	52	24	76	179	240	179	11.
16.	Žitorađa (-1)	4	120	48	20	52	150	146	163	5.
17.	**Moravac Mrštane**	3	90	42	26	22	128	66	152	**1.**
18.	Balkanski	4	118	40	29	49	140	173	149	6.
19.	**Vlasina**	4	118	40	22	56	140	175	142	5.
20.	Radnički Niš	2	58	40	12	6	114	37	132	**1.**
21.	Rudar Alpos	4	124	32	22	70	139	263	118	12.
22.	**Ozren**	3	90	30	17	43	118	134	107	7.
23.	Železničar Niš	2	64	31	11	22	146	111	104	2.
24.	Timočanin	3	90	30	12	48	97	148	102	10.
25.	Župa	3	88	25	26	37	88	131	101	9.
26.	Trayal	2	64	27	14	23	89	77	95	4.
27.	Đerdap	3	94	29	8	57	111	162	95	6.
28.	Sloga Leskovac	2	64	27	11	26	80	82	92	3.
29.	Morava Vladičin Han	2	64	27	10	27	80	86	91	10.
30.	**OFK Bor**	3	94	25	15	54	105	206	90	9.
31.	Jagodina	1	34	21	7	6	78	28	70	**1.**
32.	**Radan**	2	60	25	14	21	65	58	89	6.
33.	Topličanin (-1)	2	62	16	17	29	70	111	64	15.
34.	**Jedinstvo Bošnjace**	2	60	14	20	26	65	84	62	12.
35.	OFK Niš	2	64	17	10	37	76	122	61	11.
36.	**Dunav Prahovo**	1	30	13	7	10	44	31	46	4.
37.	**Temnić 1924** (-5)	1	30	14	8	8	43	26	45	6.
38.	Moravac Predajane	1	30	12	6	12	41	34	42	7.
39.	Železničar Vranjska Banja	1	30	12	6	12	44	38	42	8.
40.	Morava Ćuprija	1	30	13	2	15	34	53	41	8.
41.	Borac Bivolje	2	60	11	8	41	44	114	41	13.
42.	Kosanica	1	34	2	5	27	20	102	11	18.
43.	**Pukovac**	0	0	0	0	0	0	0	0	

League or status at 2015–16:

2015–16 Serbian SuperLiga
2015–16 Serbian First League
2015–16 Serbian League East
2015–16 Zone League
2015–16 The fifth degree of competition
Dissolved

== See also ==
- Serbian League Belgrade
- Serbian League Vojvodina
- Serbian League West
