= FK Vlasina =

Vlasina
- Full name: Fudbalski klub Vlasina
- Founded: 1920; 106 years ago
- Ground: Stadion Rosulja
- Capacity: 1,530
- League: Serbian League East
- 2024–25: Serbian League East, 6th of 16
Home colours	Away colours

FK Vlasina (Serbian Cyrillic: ФК Власина) is a football club based in Vlasotince, Serbia, that competes in the third-tier Serbian League East.

== History ==
The club is one of the oldest football clubs in former Yugoslavia. Founded by locals returning from higher education in major European capitals between the two World Wars, FK Vlasina exists since 1920. Symbolically, the club has been a sign of implementation of advanced European ideas in Serbian society. The development of FK Vlasina is directly linked to the social and economical development of the region around Vlasotince in south-eastern Serbia.

== Early period ==
The founder and first president was Vojislav Popović, who brought the first football in the town. Since the foundation of the club football begin to have many enthusiasts among the population. Other clubs were also founded in Vlasotince, but FK Vlasina was always the most representative one. Some clubs such as SK Dečanski and SK Omladina were merged into FK Vlasina. VSK resisted and became the main local rival. The club competed in local leagues and played numerous tournaments having had as opponents some of the major national clubs, and from this period memorable was a 2–0 win over Belgrade's SK Jugoslavija in one tournament in Niš. With the beginning of the Second World War the competitions in the region were interrompted.

== Post-World War II era ==
In 1946, sports activities restarted. After not managing it in the previous season, at the end of the season 1956–57 FK Vlasina achieved promotion to the fourth zone of the Yugoslav Second League. That season was memorable for club supporters who watched the club become a rival of many clubs that were or would become members of the Yugoslav top league. At the end of that season, the Second and lower leagues underwent restructuring and FK Vlasina ended up placing in the 3rd national league – zone Niš – for the next season. Until the 1980s, the club competed in regional leagues. In 1987–88 the club won the South Morava League. The following year, Vlasina won the Serbian League South, achieving promotion to the Serbian First League, then a third-tier league within the Yugoslav league system. In their first season they finished third, but in the following season they finished only 17th, ending up relegated. During the 1990s the club mostly played between the third and fourth tiers; however, in the late 1990s the club's youth players achieved a number of regional successes.

== New millennium ==
In January 2001 the new administration was elected, with Jovan Stojanović becoming a president who made investments in the club's infrastructure and stadium. At the end of the 2001–02 season, the club lost against FK Car Konstantin in the qualifiers to the Second League of FR Yugoslavia, but they managed to be promoted next season by winning the 2002–03 Serbian League East. They played the next season in the Second League, and in 2004–05, the club managed to reach the quarter-finals of the Serbia and Montenegro Cup, where they were unexpectedly eliminated on penalties by FK Kolubara after eliminating top league clubs such as FK Budućnost Podgorica and Belgrade's FK Rad in the previous rounds. In 2006–07 they reached the 1/8 finals where they lost again on a penalty shoot-out after a 0–0 draw against top league FK Bežanija. Until the 2007–08 season, the club successfully competed in the second league but that year they ended up relegated to the Serbian League East.

On November 17, 2010, the club celebrated its 90th anniversary with a match against Red Star Belgrade.

=== Recent league history ===
Season	Division	P	W	D	L	F	A	Pts	Pos
2020–21	3 - Serbian League East	38	21	7	10	52	35	70	4th
2021–22	3 - Serbian League East	28	12	4	12	38	40	40	8th
2022–23	3 - Serbian League East	30	10	6	14	34	47	36	12th
2023–24	3 - Serbian League East	30	11	6	13	51	44	39	11th
2024–25	3 - Serbian League East	30	14	7	9	53	37	49	6th

== Achievements ==
- Serbian League Niš
  - 2002–03

== Supporters ==
The most famous supporters group of FK Vlasina, the Poplaws (named after a flood of the Vlasotince area in the mid eighties) are widely known for creating special effects with fireworks during matches. For security reasons the stadium activity is disapproved of and was forbidden at times during the 2000s.
