= 2008–09 Serbian First League =

Serbian First League
- Season: 2008–09
- Champions: BSK Borča
- Promoted: BSK Borča; Smederevo; Mladi Radnik; Spartak Zlatibor Voda; Metalac
- Relegated: Voždovac; Hajduk Beograd
- Matches: 306
- Goals: 619 (2.02 per match)
- Average goals/game: 2.15
- Top goalscorer: (Serbia) Marko Pavićević (15)

The Serbian First League (Serbian: Prva liga Srbije) is the second-highest football league in Serbia. The league is operated by the Serbian FA. 18 teams competed in the First League for the 2008–09 season, of which 5 were promoted to the Serbian Superliga and two were relegated the Serbian League, the third-highest division overall in the Serbian football league system.

BSK Borča won the league title after topping the table with 70 points.

== League table ==
| Pos | Team | Pld | W | D | L | GF | GA | GD | Pts | Promotion or relegation |
|---|---|---|---|---|---|---|---|---|---|---|
| 1 | BSK Borča (C, P) | 34 | 20 | 10 | 4 | 45 | 16 | +29 | 70 | Promotion to Serbian SuperLiga |
| 2 | Smederevo (P) | 34 | 19 | 9 | 6 | 47 | 24 | +23 | 66 | Promotion to Serbian SuperLiga |
| 3 | Mladi Radnik (P) | 34 | 18 | 8 | 8 | 37 | 24 | +13 | 62 | Promotion to Serbian SuperLiga |
| 4 | Spartak Zlatibor Voda (P) | 34 | 17 | 9 | 8 | 46 | 27 | +19 | 60 | Promotion to Serbian SuperLiga |
| 5 | Metalac Gornji Milanovac (P) | 34 | 15 | 10 | 9 | 38 | 30 | +8 | 55 | Promotion to Serbian SuperLiga |
| 6 | Inđija | 34 | 15 | 10 | 9 | 49 | 34 | +15 | 55 | |
| 7 | Sevojno | 34 | 13 | 12 | 9 | 53 | 37 | +16 | 51 | Qualification for Europa League second qualifying round (Note: Sevojno qualified for the second qualifying round of the UEFA Europa League as runners-up of the 2008–09 Serbian Cup.) |
| 8 | ČSK Čelarevo | 34 | 14 | 8 | 12 | 31 | 35 | −4 | 50 | |
| 9 | Srem | 34 | 11 | 11 | 12 | 33 | 35 | −2 | 44 | |
| 10 | Mladost Apatin | 34 | 11 | 10 | 13 | 29 | 30 | −1 | 43 | |
| 11 | Novi Sad | 34 | 11 | 9 | 14 | 41 | 42 | −1 | 42 | |
| 12 | Kolubara | 34 | 10 | 12 | 12 | 33 | 36 | −3 | 42 | |
| 13 | Dinamo Vranje | 34 | 9 | 12 | 13 | 36 | 39 | −3 | 39 | |
| 14 | Mladost Lučani | 34 | 10 | 8 | 16 | 25 | 43 | −18 | 38 | |
| 15 | Bežanija | 34 | 8 | 13 | 13 | 34 | 40 | −6 | 37 | |
| 16 | Novi Pazar | 34 | 10 | 6 | 18 | 33 | 47 | −14 | 36 | |
| 17 | Voždovac (R) | 34 | 7 | 11 | 16 | 32 | 43 | −11 | 32 | Relegation to Serbian League |
| 18 | Hajduk Beograd (R) | 34 | 2 | 4 | 28 | 20 | 80 | −60 | 10 | Relegation to Serbian League |

Rules for classification: 1) points; 2) goal difference; 3) number of goals scored.
(C) Champions; (P) Promoted; (R) Relegated

== Results ==
| Home \ Away | BEŽ | BSK | ČSK | DVR | HBE | INĐ | KOL | MET | MLR | MAP | MLA | NPZ | NSD | SEV | SME | SZV | SRM | VOŽ |
|---|---|---|---|---|---|---|---|---|---|---|---|---|---|---|---|---|---|---|
| Bežanija | | 0–1 | 0–0 | 1–0 | 3–0 | 1–2 | 2–0 | 2–2 | 0–0 | 1–0 | 3–0 | 0–0 | 1–0 | 1–1 | 0–0 | 3–1 | 1–1 | 2–1 |
| BSK Borča | 2–0 | | 2–0 | 3–2 | 4–0 | 0–0 | 0–0 | 4–1 | 0–0 | 0–0 | 1–0 | 2–0 | 0–1 | 1–0 | 1–0 | 1–0 | 1–0 | 2–0 |
| ČSK Čelarevo | 0–0 | 0–3 | | 1–0 | 2–1 | 2–0 | 1–0 | 1–2 | 2–0 | 1–0 | 2–1 | 1–0 | 1–2 | 3–0 | 1–2 | 0–7 | 1–1 | 1–0 |
| Dinamo Vranje | 1–1 | 0–0 | 2–0 | | 2–0 | 3–0 | 0–0 | 2–2 | 2–2 | 0–0 | 3–0 | 4–1 | 2–0 | 1–1 | 1–0 | 1–1 | 0–0 | 3–1 |
| Hajduk Beograd | 3–2 | 0–1 | 0–1 | 2–1 | | 0–3 | 0–2 | 0–1 | 1–3 | 0–1 | 1–3 | 1–2 | 1–1 | 0–4 | 1–3 | 0–1 | 1–2 | 1–1 |
| Inđija | 3–0 | 1–1 | 2–1 | 3–1 | 5–1 | | 3–1 | 0–0 | 1–1 | 2–0 | 1–0 | 3–1 | 2–2 | 1–4 | 0–0 | 0–0 | 2–0 | 2–0 |
| Kolubara | 1–1 | 1–3 | 0–2 | 2–2 | 2–0 | 2–3 | | 2–0 | 2–0 | 1–0 | 3–1 | 2–1 | 2–1 | 1–1 | 0–1 | 1–1 | 1–0 | 1–3 |
| Metalac G.M. | 2–0 | 0–2 | 2–0 | 1–0 | 4–0 | 1–0 | 1–0 | | 1–0 | 1–0 | 3–0 | 1–0 | 3–1 | 1–1 | 0–2 | 2–1 | 0–0 | 3–0 |
| Mladi Radnik | 1–0 | 0–0 | 1–0 | 1–0 | 3–0 | 2–1 | 1–0 | 2–0 | | 0–3 | 1–2 | 2–0 | 2–1 | 2–0 | 2–1 | 0–0 | 1–0 | 1–0 |
| Mladost Apatin | 3–2 | 0–0 | 1–1 | 1–0 | 5–1 | 1–2 | 0–0 | 1–0 | 1–0 | | 3–0 | 1–1 | 0–3 | 1–1 | 0–2 | 1–0 | 0–2 | 2–2 |
| Mladost Lučani | 2–2 | 1–2 | 1–1 | 2–0 | 1–0 | 1–0 | 1–1 | 0–0 | 0–0 | 0–1 | | 2–1 | 1–0 | 1–0 | 0–2 | 2–1 | 0–0 | 1–0 |
| Novi Pazar | 3–1 | 0–1 | 0–1 | 4–0 | 2–1 | 2–2 | 0–0 | 2–1 | 2–1 | 1–0 | 3–1 | | 0–0 | 2–1 | 0–0 | 0–2 | 2–4 | 1–0 |
| Novi Sad | 1–0 | 1–1 | 0–2 | 1–1 | 4–0 | 0–3 | 1–2 | 2–0 | 0–1 | 0–1 | 0–0 | 3–1 | | 2–1 | 2–2 | 1–0 | 2–2 | 1–0 |
| Sevojno | 1–1 | 2–2 | 2–2 | 3–0 | 5–2 | 0–0 | 0–0 | 2–2 | 0–2 | 2–1 | 3–0 | 4–0 | 2–1 | | 0–0 | 3–0 | 2–1 | 1–0 |
| Smederevo | 3–1 | 2–1 | 2–0 | 2–1 | 1–1 | 3–1 | 2–2 | 2–0 | 3–2 | 1–1 | 3–1 | 1–0 | 2–0 | 0–1 | | 0–1 | 1–0 | 2–1 |
| Spartak Zlatibor Voda | 2–1 | 2–0 | 1–0 | 3–0 (Note: Match awarded.) | 1–1 | 1–0 | 0–0 | 0–0 | 0–1 | 1–0 | 1–0 | 2–1 | 3–2 | 3–2 | 2–1 | | 4–0 | 1–0 |
| Srem | 3–1 | 0–2 | 0–0 | 0–1 | 2–0 | 1–0 | 2–0 | 0–0 | 0–0 | 0–0 | 1–0 | 1–0 | 1–3 | 1–2 | 0–1 | 1–1 | | 4–3 |
| Voždovac | 0–0 | 2–1 | 0–0 | 0–0 | 2–0 | 1–1 | 2–1 | 1–1 | 1–2 | 2–0 | 0–0 | 1–0 | 2–2 | 2–1 | 0–0 | 2–2 | 2–3 | |

Legend: Blue = home team win; Yellow = draw; Red = away team win.

== See also ==
- List of football clubs in Serbia
- Serbia national football team
- Serbian First League
- Serbian League
