= FK Železničar Beograd =

Železničar Beograd
- Full name: Fudbalski Klub Železničar
- Founded: 1924; 102 years ago
- Dissolved: 2015
- Ground: Bara Venecija, Belgrade
- 2015–16: Belgrade Zone League, withdrew
Home colours	Away colours

FK Železničar (Serbian Cyrillic: ФК Железничар) was a Serbian football club based in Belgrade.

== History ==
FK Železničar was formed in 1924, when a group of workers from the Belgrade railway station began playing the game. Later that year, the first team was formed. In the 1927–28 season the club started to compete and, by the end of their first season, they finished fifth. The club had many problems with their financial status but they continued to play. In 1935, FK Železničar built a new stadium. In the opening match they crushed FK Građanski, from Zemun, 12–0, in a memorable match for the fans. The club stayed in the same league until the Second World War.

During the war, all games had been cut but, after it ended, the sport association of Železničar began to form new sport societies. The team began to compete in higher leagues. In the early 1950s, they competed in the "Unified Sport League" (Jedinstvena sportska Liga). Later they moved on to the First League of Belgrade. In the 1989 season, the club was promoted to the Belgrade Zone, at that time the highest competition in Belgrade.

In 1995, they became member of the Serbian League Belgrade, however its major success was achieved in 1999 when it gained promotion into the FR Yugoslav Second League – group North, where it stayed until 2003, when it was relegated by administrative decision because of the restructuring of the league competition system.

== Final league seasons ==
Season	Division	P	W	D	L	F	A	Pts	Pos
2012–13	4 - Belgrade Zone League	32	13	8	11	38	41	47	7th
2013–14	4 - Belgrade Zone League	30	13	8	9	43	27	47	4th
2014–15	4 - Belgrade Zone League	28	11	7	10	28	36	40	6th

== Notable players ==
For the list of former and current players with Wikipedia article, please see: Category:FK Železničar Beograd players.

== Historical list of coaches ==
Important coaches in club history:

- (Socialist Federal Republic of Yugoslavia) Mikica Arsenijević
- (Socialist Federal Republic of Yugoslavia) Rajko Mitić
- (Serbia and Montenegro) Miroljub Čolović
- (Serbia and Montenegro) Božidar Milenković
- (Serbia and Montenegro) Tomislav Savić
- (Serbia and Montenegro) Goran Kalušević
