= List of Serbian football transfers winter 2012–13 =

This is a list of transfers in Serbian football for the 2012 winter transfer window. Only moves featuring a Serbian SuperLiga side are listed. The order by which the clubs are listed is equal to the classification of the SuperLiga at the end of the current half-season, 2012–13.

== Serbian SuperLiga ==
=== Partizan ===
In: Note: Flags indicate national team as defined under FIFA eligibility rules; some limited exceptions apply. Players may hold more than one non-FIFA nationality.

No.	Pos.	Nation	Player
10	MF	BRA	Eliomar (from Javor)
7	MF	SRB	Predrag Luka (from Rad)
9	FW	SRB	Nemanja Kojić (from Rad)
23	DF	SRB	Tomislav Pajović (on loan from (Moldova) Sheriff)
24	DF	SRB	Marko Živković (from Teleoptik)
17	DF	SRB	Andrija Živković (from Teleoptik)

Out: Note: Flags indicate national team as defined under FIFA eligibility rules; some limited exceptions apply. Players may hold more than one non-FIFA nationality.

No.	Pos.	Nation	Player
10	MF	SRB	Zvonimir Vukić (to (Greece) PAOK)
7	MF	SRB	Nemanja Tomić (to (Turkey) Gençlerbirliği)
33	GK	SRB	Radiša Ilić (retired, now Goalkeeping Coach)
9	FW	BRA	Eduardo (on loan to (Brazil) São Caetano)
12	FW	SRB	Stefan Šćepović (on loan to (Israel) Ashdod)
4	MF	SLE	Medo (to (England) Bolton Wanderers)
17	DF	SRB	Sreten Sretenović (to (South Korea) Gyeongnam FC)
27	FW	LBA	Mohamed Zubya (released)

=== Red Star Belgrade ===
In: Note: Flags indicate national team as defined under FIFA eligibility rules; some limited exceptions apply. Players may hold more than one non-FIFA nationality.

No.	Pos.	Nation	Player
18	FW	SRB	Ognjen Ožegović (loan return from Banat Zrenjanin)
3	DF	SRB	Nikola Petković (from (Israel) Hapoel Tel Aviv)
20	MF	HON	Luis Garrido (on loan from (Honduras) Olimpia)
9	FW	NGR	Abiola Dauda (from (Sweden) Kalmar FF)

Out: Note: Flags indicate national team as defined under FIFA eligibility rules; some limited exceptions apply. Players may hold more than one non-FIFA nationality.

No.	Pos.	Nation	Player
21	MF	SRB	Marko Perović (to (Iran) Persepolis)
—	GK	SRB	Rastko Šuljagić (to (Germany) VfB Stuttgart, from youth squad)
31	GK	SRB	Marko Dmitrović (released)
—	DF	SRB	Filip Stojković (on loan to Čukarički, was on loan at Banat Zrenjanin)
—	MF	SRB	Stevan Luković (on loan to (Bosnia and Herzegovina) Leotar, was on loan at Kolubara)
20	MF	SRB	Marko Mirić (on loan to Radnički 1923)
9	FW	AUS	Eli Babalj (to (Australia) Melbourne Heart)
—	MF	SRB	Petar Đuričković (loan extension to Radnički 1923)
3	DF	SRB	Ljubo Nenadić (on loan to Novi Pazar)
—	MF	SRB	Filip Janković (released)
—	MF	SRB	Nemanja Ahčin (on loan to Radnik Surdulica, previously on loan at FK Sopot)

=== FK Jagodina ===
In: Note: Flags indicate national team as defined under FIFA eligibility rules; some limited exceptions apply. Players may hold more than one non-FIFA nationality.

No.	Pos.	Nation	Player
16	DF	MNE	Luka Petričević (free, last with (Greece) PAOK)
3	MF	GHA	Francis Bossman (from (Azerbaijan) Ravan Baku)
4	DF	SRB	Milan Milinković (from Javor)
13	MF	BIH	Dario Damjanović (from FK Novi Pazar)
77	MF	SRB	Filip Arsenijević (from (Kazakhstan) Shakhter Karagandy)

Out: Note: Flags indicate national team as defined under FIFA eligibility rules; some limited exceptions apply. Players may hold more than one non-FIFA nationality.

No.	Pos.	Nation	Player
16	FW	POR	Marcelo Santiago (to (Portugal) Naval)
3	DF	SRB	Nikola Valentić (to (Azerbaijan) Gabala FC)
55	DF	SRB	Ivan Dragičević (to Radnički Niš)
5	DF	SRB	Vukašin Tomić (on loan to (Kazakhstan) FC Taraz)
—	FW	SRB	Vladimir Milenković (on loan to Timok)
—	DF	SRB	Ilija Vlasković (on loan to Morava Ćuprija, previously on loan at Trgovački Jagodina)
—	FW	SRB	Nikola Mandić (on loan to Morava Ćuprija)
—	FW	SRB	Nikola Arsić (on loan to Sloga Despotovac)
—	MF	SRB	Milan Simonović (on loan to Trgovački Jagodina, previously on loan at Sloga Despotovac)
—	DF	SRB	Andreja Dojčinović (on loan to Trgovački Jagodina)
—	FW	SRB	Igor Dimitrijević (on loan to Trgovački Jagodina)

=== FK Vojvodina ===
In: Note: Flags indicate national team as defined under FIFA eligibility rules; some limited exceptions apply. Players may hold more than one non-FIFA nationality.

No.	Pos.	Nation	Player
33	MF	SRB	Aleksandar Katai (loan extension from (Greece) Olympiacos F.C.)
7	MF	SRB	Enver Alivodić (from FK Novi Pazar)
9	FW	SRB	Đorđe Šušnjar (loan return from (Montenegro) Sutjeska Nikšić)
10	MF	BIH	Stojan Vranješ (from (Romania) Pandurii)
5	DF	MNE	Igor Vujačić (from (Montenegro) FK Zeta)

Out: Note: Flags indicate national team as defined under FIFA eligibility rules; some limited exceptions apply. Players may hold more than one non-FIFA nationality.

No.	Pos.	Nation	Player
10	MF	GBS	Almami Moreira (to (Spain) UD Salamanca)
—	DF	MKD	Daniel Mojsov (to (Norway) SK Brann)
9	FW	SRB	Milan Bojović (to (Greece) Panetolikos F.C.)
16	MF	BIH	Miroslav Stevanović (to (Spain) Sevilla FC)
—	DF	BIH	Damjan Marčeta (to Donji Srem, from youth squad)
24	DF	SRB	Dejan Karan (on loan to FK Voždovac)
—	GK	SRB	Stefan Mijatović (on loan to (Montenegro) Obilić Herceg Novi)
—	MF	SRB	Slaven Baškalo (on loan to Dunav Stari Banovci)
25	GK	SRB	Aleksandar Kesić (on loan to Radnički Niš)
7	FW	SRB	Petar Škuletić (on loan to Radnički Niš)
—	DF	SRB	Dušan Nestorović (was on loan, now signed with (Montenegro) Rudar Pljevlja)
32	MF	SRB	Dejan Meleg (to (Netherlands) AFC Ajax)
4	MF	NED	Serginho Greene (on loan to (Cyprus) AEK Larnaca)
11	FW	BIH	Nemanja Bilbija (on loan to (Bosnia and Herzegovina) Borac Banja Luka)
—	MF	SRB	Mirko Ivanić (loan extension to Proleter Novi Sad)
—	DF	SRB	Vladimir Kovačević (loan extension to Proleter Novi Sad)
—	DF	SRB	Milovan Petrić (on loan to RFK Novi Sad)
—	FW	MNE	Šaleta Kordić (on loan to RFK Novi Sad, was on loan at (Montenegro) Mladost Podgorica)

=== Rad ===
In: Note: Flags indicate national team as defined under FIFA eligibility rules; some limited exceptions apply. Players may hold more than one non-FIFA nationality.

No.	Pos.	Nation	Player
7	MF	SRB	Marko Adamović (from Spartak Subotica)
16	DF	SRB	Miroslav Pešić (on loan from Železnik)
—	MF	SRB	Stefan Vukadin (from Čukarički)

Out: Note: Flags indicate national team as defined under FIFA eligibility rules; some limited exceptions apply. Players may hold more than one non-FIFA nationality.

No.	Pos.	Nation	Player
10	MF	SRB	Goran Čaušić (to (Turkey) Eskişehirspor)
7	MF	SRB	Andrej Mrkela (on loan to (Turkey) Eskişehirspor)
25	DF	SRB	Milan Mitrović (to (Turkey) Mersin İdmanyurdu)
—	MF	BIH	Duško Sakan (to (Bosnia and Herzegovina) Sloboda (MG), was on loan at (Bosnia and Herzegovina) Rudar Prijedor)
28	FW	SRB	Nenad Lukić (to Donji Srem)
8	MF	SRB	Branislav Jovanović (to (Israel) Hapoel Acre)
17	FW	SRB	Nikola Stojiljković (to Čukarički)
—	GK	SRB	Branislav Danilović (on loan to BSK Borča)
—	DF	MNE	Srđan Ajković (on loan to BSK Borča)
—	FW	SRB	Dario Božičić (on loan to BSK Borča, was on loan at RFK Novi Sad)
20	MF	SRB	Predrag Luka (to Partizan)
27	FW	SRB	Nemanja Kojić (to Partizan)
22	MF	SRB	Marko Ljubinković (to Radnički Niš)
—	MF	SRB	Ivan Rogač (on loan to BSK Borča)
—	MF	SRB	Aleksandar Marinković (on loan to BSK Borča)
—	DF	SRB	Dejan Lunova (to Dunav Stari Banovci)
—	MF	SRB	Stefan Tripković (on loan to Banat Zrenjanin, previously on loan at BASK)
—	MF	SRB	Dušan Plavšić (on loan to OFK Mladenovac, previously brought from BASK)
—	MF	SRB	Dušan Pantelić (on loan to OFK Mladenovac)
—	GK	SRB	Miloš Dikić (on loan to FK Kovačevac, previously on loan at BASK)
—	DF	SRB	Vladimir Rodić (on loan to Srem Jakovo, previously on loan at BASK)

=== Javor Ivanjica ===
In: Note: Flags indicate national team as defined under FIFA eligibility rules; some limited exceptions apply. Players may hold more than one non-FIFA nationality.

No.	Pos.	Nation	Player
9	FW	SRB	Filip Kostić (from (Hungary) Budapest Honvéd)
6	DF	BIH	Ognjen Petrović (from (Bosnia and Herzegovina) Kozara Gradiška)
18	MF	SRB	Marko Milosavljević (from OFK Mladenovac)
10	MF	SRB	Igor Stojaković (from (North Macedonia) FK Vardar)
7	MF	CMR	Patrick Kamgaing (free, last with (Algeria) ASO Chlef)
—	FW	SRB	Nikola Ivanović (from (Slovenia) NK Celje)
22	DF	CMR	Ibrahim Walidjo (from (Cameroon) Renaissance de Ngoumou)
—	FW	SRB	Borko Veselinović (from Spartak Subotica)

Out: Note: Flags indicate national team as defined under FIFA eligibility rules; some limited exceptions apply. Players may hold more than one non-FIFA nationality.

No.	Pos.	Nation	Player
7	MF	MKD	Nikola Jakimovski (to (Japan) Nagoya Grampus)
13	FW	SRB	Žarko Lazetić (to FK Bežanija)
10	MF	BRA	Eliomar (to Partizan)
30	FW	SRB	Dragan Milovanović (to Radnički 1923)
22	DF	SRB	Milan Milinković (to FK Jagodina)
21	DF	MNE	Milko Novaković (to BSK Borča)
—	DF	SRB	Marko Kolaković (on loan to Rudar Kostolac)
—	GK	SRB	Petar Glintić (on loan to Sloga Petrovac)
—	DF	SRB	Igor Mitić (on loan to Sloga Petrovac, previously on loan at Rudar Kostolac)

=== Sloboda Užice ===
In: Note: Flags indicate national team as defined under FIFA eligibility rules; some limited exceptions apply. Players may hold more than one non-FIFA nationality.

No.	Pos.	Nation	Player
55	DF	BIH	Delimir Bajić (from (Cyprus) Olympiakos Nicosia)
10	MF	TJK	Nuriddin Davronov (from (Tajikistan) Istiqlol Dushanbe)
35	GK	SRB	Zoran Mijanović (out of retirement)
23	FW	NGR	Daniel Olerum (from (Iran) Aboomoslem)
21	MF	GUI	Kalla Toure (from (Republic of the Congo) Étoile du Congo)

Out: Note: Flags indicate national team as defined under FIFA eligibility rules; some limited exceptions apply. Players may hold more than one non-FIFA nationality.

No.	Pos.	Nation	Player
8	FW	BIH	Duško Stajić (to (Bosnia and Herzegovina) Čelik Zenica)
44	MF	BIH	Ajdin Maksumić (to (Bosnia and Herzegovina) GOŠK Gabela)
12	GK	SRB	Bojan Šejić (to Sloga Kraljevo)
10	MF	SRB	Bojan Beljić (to Radnički 1923)
7	DF	BIH	Slavko Marić (to Radnički 1923)
23	FW	SRB	Savo Kovačević (to (Switzerland) St. Gallen)
55	DF	SRB	Slavko Ćulibrk (to (North Macedonia) FK Rabotnički)

=== Spartak Subotica ===
In: Note: Flags indicate national team as defined under FIFA eligibility rules; some limited exceptions apply. Players may hold more than one non-FIFA nationality.

No.	Pos.	Nation	Player
—	DF	SRB	Stefan Branković (from BSK Borča)
3	DF	MNE	Slavko Damjanović (from (Montenegro) FK Mornar)
14	DF	SRB	Nebojša Mezei (loan return from FK Palić)
5	DF	CMR	Noé Archille Kwin (from (Cameroon) Coton Sport)

Out: Note: Flags indicate national team as defined under FIFA eligibility rules; some limited exceptions apply. Players may hold more than one non-FIFA nationality.

No.	Pos.	Nation	Player
19	FW	MKD	Fahrudin Đurđević (to (Bosnia and Herzegovina) Zvijezda Gradačac)
7	MF	SRB	Marko Adamović (to FK Rad)
—	GK	SRB	Nikola Mirković (loan extension to (Bosnia and Herzegovina) Zvijezda Gradačac)
16	FW	SRB	Borko Veselinović (to Javor Ivanjica)
—	GK	BIH	Slaviša Bogdanović (on loan to FK Palić)

=== OFK Beograd ===
In: Note: Flags indicate national team as defined under FIFA eligibility rules; some limited exceptions apply. Players may hold more than one non-FIFA nationality.

No.	Pos.	Nation	Player
18	MF	MNE	Petar Grbić (loan extension from (Greece) Olympiacos F.C.)
3	MF	BIH	Edin Rustemović (free, last with (Bosnia and Herzegovina) Drina Zvornik)
28	FW	MNE	Igor Ivanović (from (Montenegro) Rudar Pljevlja)
13	MF	SRB	Aleksandar Paločević (loan return from FK Voždovac)
—	FW	SRB	Uroš Nenadović (loan return from RFK Novi Sad)

Out: Note: Flags indicate national team as defined under FIFA eligibility rules; some limited exceptions apply. Players may hold more than one non-FIFA nationality.

No.	Pos.	Nation	Player
25	GK	SRB	Nikola Matek (to Metalac GM)
36	MF	SRB	Miloš Žeravica (to Napredak Kruševac)
30	MF	SRB	Goran Brkić (loan extension to Jedinstvo Putevi)
12	GK	MNE	Andrija Dragojević (on loan to (Montenegro) FK Lovćen)
21	DF	SRB	Milan Rodić (to (Russia) Zenit St. Petersburg)
33	DF	MNE	Stevan Marković (to (Montenegro) FK Mornar)
—	MF	SRB	Ilija Tutnjević (on loan to FK Bačka Topola, was on loan at Sloga Temerin)
28	FW	SRB	Bojan Aleksić (on loan to FK Voždovac)
—	MF	SRB	Alen Halilović (on loan to (Montenegro) FK Lovćen, previously on loan at FK Dorćol)
—	MF	MNE	Miloje Raičević (on loan to (Montenegro) Jedinstvo Bijelo Polje, previously on loan at Radnički Nova Pazova)
—	DF	SRB	Miroslav Babić (on loan to Jedinstvo Putevi, was on loan at Dorćol)
—	DF	SRB	Dušan Stanković (on loan to Timok, previously on loan at Bačka Topola)
—	FW	SRB	Miloš Stanković (on loan to Timok, previously on loan at Bačka Topola)
—	FW	SRB	Miloš Brujić (on loan to Hajduk Beograd, previously on loan at FK Dorćol)
—	MF	SRB	Igor Stanojević (on loan to PKB Padinska Skela)
—	GK	SRB	Marko Matić (on loan to GFK Jasenica 1911)
—	FW	SRB	Marko Radivojević (on loan to Trstenik)

=== FK Novi Pazar ===
In: Note: Flags indicate national team as defined under FIFA eligibility rules; some limited exceptions apply. Players may hold more than one non-FIFA nationality.

No.	Pos.	Nation	Player
86	DF	SRB	Miloš Marković (from Mladost Lučani)
3	DF	BIH	Aleksandar Vasiljević (from (Bosnia and Herzegovina) FK Leotar)
99	FW	SRB	Mladen Popović (from Hajduk Kula)
64	MF	SRB	Zoran Vujović (free, last with (Hungary) FC Tatabánya)
7	FW	SRB	Vladimir Vujović (from FK Bežanija)
12	DF	SRB	Zoran Pešić (from Radnički Niš)
5	MF	SRB	Miljan Mutavdžić (from Radnički 1923)
32	MF	BIH	Borislav Topić (from (Bosnia and Herzegovina) Rudar Prijedor)
25	DF	MNE	Dejan Boljević (from (Slovakia) Tatran Presov)
88	MF	BIH	Haris Redžepi (from (Bosnia and Herzegovina) NK Travnik)
55	DF	SRB	Marko Milić (from FK Bežanija)
33	DF	SRB	Ljubo Nenadić (on loan from Red Star)
11	FW	SRB	Nemanja Vidaković (from (Azerbaijan) Ravan Baku)
44	DF	SRB	Radoš Bulatović (from Hajduk Kula)
—	MF	CMR	Idriss Nguessi (from (Cameroon) Etoa Meki FC)
1	GK	SRB	Miloš Budaković (from KS Cracovia)

Out: Note: Flags indicate national team as defined under FIFA eligibility rules; some limited exceptions apply. Players may hold more than one non-FIFA nationality.

No.	Pos.	Nation	Player
11	MF	SRB	Enver Alivodić (to Vojvodina)
8	MF	SRB	Filip Stojanović (to FK Voždovac)
22	MF	SRB	Semir Hadžibulić (to (Cyprus) Doxa Katokopia)
30	FW	BIH	Admir Raščić (to (Bosnia and Herzegovina) Borac Banja Luka)
1	GK	BIH	Denis Mujkić (to (Bosnia and Herzegovina) Budućnost Banovići)
5	DF	SRB	Ahmed Mujdragić (loan return to Hajduk Kula)
6	DF	SRB	Slobodan Jakovljević (to FK Inđija)
28	FW	SRB	Saša Popin (to (Romania) Pandurii Târgu Jiu)
50	DF	SRB	Slavko Lukić (to FK Smederevo)
3	DF	SRB	Miloš Rnić (to (Belarus) FC Minsk)
7	MF	SRB	Irfan Vušljanin (to Borac Čačak)
13	MF	BIH	Dario Damjanović (to FK Jagodina)
10	MF	SRB	Risto Ristović (to (Azerbaijan) FC Baku)
25	DF	SRB	Dragan Žarković (loan return to Hajduk Kula)
—	MF	SRB	Elmin Marukić (on loan to Vujić Voda Valjevo, previously on loan at Morava Ćuprija)

=== Donji Srem ===
In: Note: Flags indicate national team as defined under FIFA eligibility rules; some limited exceptions apply. Players may hold more than one non-FIFA nationality.

No.	Pos.	Nation	Player
12	GK	SRB	Ljubo Kovačević (from BSK Borča)
13	FW	SRB	Đuro Zec (from Proleter Novi Sad)
1	MF	SRB	Saša Teofanov (from Dinamo Pančevo)
22	DF	BIH	Borislav Terzić (from Zemun)
25	MF	SRB	Igor Miladinović (from Zemun)
18	FW	BIH	Ognjen Škorić (from (Bosnia and Herzegovina) Kozara Gradiška)
99	DF	BIH	Damjan Marčeta (from Vojvodina youth team)
15	FW	SRB	Nenad Lukić (from FK Rad)
17	MF	BIH	Rade Krunić (from (Bosnia and Herzegovina) Sutjeska Foča)

Out: Note: Flags indicate national team as defined under FIFA eligibility rules; some limited exceptions apply. Players may hold more than one non-FIFA nationality.

No.	Pos.	Nation	Player
12	GK	SRB	Dragan Starčević (to Radnički Stobex)
5	DF	SRB	Boris Milekić (to Jedinstvo Putevi)
2	DF	SRB	Nemanja Marković (to RFK Novi Sad)
30	MF	SRB	Uroš Milosavljević (released)
18	FW	SRB	Dejan Jovanović (released)
13	MF	SRB	Žarko Jeličić (to (Thailand) TOT S.C.)
25	FW	SRB	Branislav Tošić (on loan to Hajduk Kula)
15	DF	AUS	Matthew Byrne (to Teleoptik)
10	FW	SRB	Miša Petković (to Radnički Nova Pazova)
17	DF	SRB	Marko Putinčanin (to FK Bežanija)
40	GK	SRB	Anđelko Đuričić (to Borac Čačak)
22	MF	SRB	Nemanja Tošić (to Jedinstvo Putevi)
—	DF	SRB	Ivan Šubert (on loan to Sinđelić Beograd, previously on loan at Radnički Šid)
—	FW	BIH	Nemanja Mrkajić (on loan to Jedinstvo Stara Pazova, previously on loan at Radnički Šid)

=== Radnički Niš ===
In: Note: Flags indicate national team as defined under FIFA eligibility rules; some limited exceptions apply. Players may hold more than one non-FIFA nationality.

No.	Pos.	Nation	Player
—	MF	SRB	Petar Mitić (loan return from FK Žitorađa)
—	GK	SRB	Aleksandar Kesić (on loan from Vojvodina)
11	FW	SRB	Petar Škuletić (on loan from Vojvodina)
48	MF	SRB	Marko Ljubinković (from FK Rad)
55	DF	SRB	Ivan Dragičević (from FK Jagodina)
58	DF	MNE	Stefan Cicmil (from (Montenegro) Budućnost Podgorica)
40	DF	GHA	Kojo Kankam (from (Ghana) Asante Kotoko)

Out: Note: Flags indicate national team as defined under FIFA eligibility rules; some limited exceptions apply. Players may hold more than one non-FIFA nationality.

No.	Pos.	Nation	Player
3	DF	SRB	Branislav Vukomanović (tp (Canada) London City)
16	DF	SRB	Zoran Pešić (to FK Novi Pazar)
7	FW	CRO	Milan Pavličić (released)
9	FW	MKD	Aleksandar Bajevski (released)
11	DF	SRB	Marko Ranđelović (to (Kazakhstan) FC Taraz)
—	DF	SRB	Nikola Vukadinović (on loan to Kopaonik Brus, previously brought from Zaplanjac Gadžin Han)
—	FW	SRB	Igor Stupar (on loan to Kopaonik Brus, previously brought from Car Konstantin)
—	GK	SRB	Miodrag Filipović (on loan to Radnik Surdulica)
—	MF	SRB	Aleksandar Stanković (on loan to Sinđelić Niš, previously on loan at Zaplanjac Gadžin Han)

=== BSK Borča ===
In: Note: Flags indicate national team as defined under FIFA eligibility rules; some limited exceptions apply. Players may hold more than one non-FIFA nationality.

No.	Pos.	Nation	Player
—	DF	SRB	Vladimir Advigov (loan return from Vujić Voda)
—	MF	BIH	Ognjen Blagojević (loan return from PKB Padinska Skela)
—	MF	BRA	Gabriel Neves (from (Croatia) NK Koprivnica)
17	MF	BIH	Edin Ademović (from (Bosnia and Herzegovina) FK Sarajevo)
30	GK	SRB	Branislav Danilović (on loan from FK Rad)
7	DF	MNE	Srđan Ajković (on loan from FK Rad)
33	FW	SRB	Dario Božičić (on loan from FK Rad)
32	MF	SRB	Nenad Jovanović (from (Montenegro) OFK Petrovac)
—	DF	SRB	Dušan Dunjić (from (North Macedonia) Bregalnica Štip)
1	FW	SRB	Vladimir Matić (from (Montenegro) OFK Grbalj)
26	DF	MNE	Milko Novaković (from Javor Ivanjica)
4	MF	SRB	Ivan Rogač (on loan from FK Rad)
11	GK	SRB	Aleksandar Marinković (on loan from FK Rad)

Out: Note: Flags indicate national team as defined under FIFA eligibility rules; some limited exceptions apply. Players may hold more than one non-FIFA nationality.

No.	Pos.	Nation	Player
1	FW	SRB	Vuk Sotirović (to (Cyprus) Nea Salamina)
34	GK	SRB	Ljubo Kovačević (to Donji Srem)
32	MF	MKD	Perica Stančeski (to (Bosnia and Herzegovina) Zvijezda Gradačac)
31	DF	SRB	Miroslav Gegić (to FK Smederevo)
33	DF	SRB	Ivica Milutinović (released)
3	DF	MNE	Nikola Čelebić (to (Montenegro) OFK Petrovac)
4	MF	SRB	Aleksandar Petrović (to (North Macedonia) FK Vardar)
—	DF	SRB	Stefan Branković (to Spartak Subotica)
12	GK	SRB	Miroslav Grujičić (to FK Teleoptik)
9	FW	SRB	Nenad Živković (to FK Kolubara)
24	DF	SRB	Marko Bošković (to Napredak Kruševac)
—	FW	SRB	Milan Đanković (to RFK Novi Sad)
—	DF	SRB	Miloš Andrić (on loan to PKB Padinska Skela, previously on loan at Šumadija Sopić)
—	FW	SRB	Nenad Đurđević (on loan to Radnik Surdulica)

=== Hajduk Kula ===
In: Note: Flags indicate national team as defined under FIFA eligibility rules; some limited exceptions apply. Players may hold more than one non-FIFA nationality.

No.	Pos.	Nation	Player
13	FW	SRB	Branislav Tošić (on loan from Donji Srem)
18	DF	SRB	Nino Pekarić (free, last with (Cyprus) Nea Salamina)
22	MF	SRB	Marko Jevtović (from FK Sopot)
4	DF	SRB	Slobodan Vuković (from Banat Zrenjanin)
20	MF	SRB	Dejan Rusmir (free, last with (Cyprus) Olympiakos Nicosia)
11	MF	CMR	Jacques Ekangue Tabi (from (United Arab Emirates) Al-Ahli Dubai)

Out: Note: Flags indicate national team as defined under FIFA eligibility rules; some limited exceptions apply. Players may hold more than one non-FIFA nationality.

No.	Pos.	Nation	Player
18	FW	SRB	Mladen Popović (to FK Novi Pazar)
11	MF	SRB	Aleksandar Ćovin (to (Belarus) FC Slavia Mozyr)
25	MF	SRB	Aleksandar Stojković (to FK Voždovac)
4	DF	SRB	Radoš Bulatović (to FK Novi Pazar)
28	MF	SRB	Milan Zorica (to Dunav Stari Banovci)
22	MF	BIH	Peđa Jerinić (to RFK Novi Sad)
—	DF	SRB	Ahmed Mujdragić (to (Albania) Shkumbini, was on loan at FK Novi Pazar)
—	DF	SRB	Stojan Vorkapić (loan extension to FK Bačka Topola)
—	MF	SRB	Darko Sušić (on loan to FK Bačka Topola, was on loan at FK Srbobran)
—	FW	SRB	Ognjen Šveljo (on loan to Radnički Sombor, was on loan at FK Crvenka)
23	MF	SRB	Nemanja Bošković (to Radnički Sombor)
—	DF	SRB	Dragan Žarković (to (Romania) FCM Târgu Mureș, was on loan at FK Novi Pazar)
13	DF	MNE	Miloš Kovačević (on loan to RFK Novi Sad)
99	FW	SRB	Milan Bubalo (to (South Korea) Gyeongnam FC, previously brought from (Slovenia) Koper)
—	DF	SRB	Aleksandar Krsić (on loan to Tekstilac Odžaci)

=== Radnički 1923 Kragujevac ===
In: Note: Flags indicate national team as defined under FIFA eligibility rules; some limited exceptions apply. Players may hold more than one non-FIFA nationality.

No.	Pos.	Nation	Player
23	MF	SRB	Marko Mirić (on loan from Red Star)
21	MF	SRB	Petar Đuričković (loan extension from Red Star)
33	FW	SRB	Dragan Milovanović (from Javor Ivanjica)
14	MF	SRB	Bojan Beljić (from Sloboda Užice)
77	DF	BIH	Slavko Marić (from Sloboda Užice)

Out: Note: Flags indicate national team as defined under FIFA eligibility rules; some limited exceptions apply. Players may hold more than one non-FIFA nationality.

No.	Pos.	Nation	Player
23	DF	BIH	Aleksandar Kosorić (to (Iraq) Erbil SC)
15	MF	SRB	Miljan Mutavdžić (to FK Novi Pazar)

=== FK Smederevo ===
In: Note: Flags indicate national team as defined under FIFA eligibility rules; some limited exceptions apply. Players may hold more than one non-FIFA nationality.

No.	Pos.	Nation	Player
3	DF	SRB	Marko Ristić (free, last with Radnički 1923)
33	DF	SRB	Miroslav Gegić (from BSK Borča)
27	MF	SRB	Dragan Cvetković (from OFK Mladenovac)
25	MF	SRB	Lazar Pavić (from FK Žarkovo)
—	DF	SRB	Bojan Živković (from Metalac Gornji Milanovac)
10	MF	SRB	Bojan Čukić (from Borac Čačak)
8	FW	SRB	Predrag Sikimić (from Radnički 1923)
55	DF	SRB	Dragan Radosavljević (from Radnički 1923)
77	DF	SRB	Slavko Lukić (from FK Novi Pazar)
19	DF	SRB	Branislav Atanacković (from Borac Čačak)
20	DF	SRB	Ivan Božović (from OFK Beograd)
14	MF	SRB	Marko Milosavljević (loan return from Seljak Mihajlovac)
12	GK	SRB	Nikola Milojević (from Borac Čačak)
16	DF	SRB	Saša Blagojević (from Teleoptik)

Out: Note: Flags indicate national team as defined under FIFA eligibility rules; some limited exceptions apply. Players may hold more than one non-FIFA nationality.

No.	Pos.	Nation	Player
19	MF	SRB	Milan Vukašinović (released)
6	MF	SRB	Srđan Urošević (to (Bosnia and Herzegovina) FK Slavija)
90	DF	SRB	Vladimir Stanojević (to FK Bežanija)
11	FW	SRB	Nebojša Stanojlović (to Mladost Lučani)
84	MF	SRB	Vladimir Miljković (released)
27	MF	SRB	Luka Savić (to (Indonesia) Persiba Balikpapan)
15	MF	BRA	Lucas (released)
16	DF	BRA	João Paulo (to (Brazil) Bonsucesso)
4	DF	MNE	Dejan Ognjanović (to (Montenegro) Sutjeska Nikšić)
55	DF	SRB	Igor Miović (to (Hong Kong) Pegasus)
14	DF	MKD	Vlade Lazarevski (to (Albania) Flamurtari Vlorë)
5	MF	SRB	Miloš Nikolić (to (Bahrain) -)
3	DF	SRB	Borislav Simić (to Čukarički)
25	MF	SRB	Nikola Bogić (to Banat Zrenjanin)
8	MF	MNE	Luka Tiodorović (to (Albania) Luftëtari Gjirokastër)
9	FW	MNE	Nikola Radojičić (to (Montenegro) OFK Grbalj)
27	MF	SRB	Marko Jovanović (to (Bosnia and Herzegovina) Slavija Sarajevo)
31	GK	SRB	Srđan Soldatović (retired, now goalkeeping coach at (Ukraine) Tavriya Simferopol, previously came out of retirement)
66	DF	MNE	Marko Stanovčić (to FK Zemun)
—	FW	BRA	Kamilo Silva (released after loan return from Jedinstvo Putevi)

== See also ==
- Serbian SuperLiga
- 2012–13 Serbian SuperLiga
- List of Serbian football transfers summer 2012

== External sources ==
- Sportske.net information agency.
- SuperLiga news at Sportski žurnal website.
- Sportal.rs information agency.
- Srpskifudbal.rs football website. Transfers page
- Superliga.rs
