= 2006–07 Serbian League East =

Serbian League East
- Season: 2006–07
- Champions: Jagodina
- Promoted: Jagodina
- Relegated: Kosanica; Đerdap; Car Konstantin; Topličanin; Bor; Jedinstvo Paraćin
- Top goalscorer: Igor Pavlović

The 2006–07 Serbian League East season was the fourth season of the league under its current title. It began in August 2006 and ended in June 2007.

== League table ==
Pos	Team	Pld	W	D	L	GF	GA	GD	Pts	Promotion or relegation
1	Jagodina (C, P)	34	21	7	6	78	28	+50	70	Promotion to Serbian First League
2	Železničar Niš	34	19	6	9	57	32	+25	63	
3	Sloga Leskovac	34	17	8	9	49	37	+12	59	
4	Trayal	34	16	9	9	55	31	+24	57	
5	Sinđelić Niš	34	16	7	11	62	40	+22	55	
6	Svrljig	34	15	7	12	51	41	+10	52	
7	Dubočica	34	15	6	13	54	50	+4	51	
8	Kopaonik (Note: 1 point deducted)	34	15	7	12	35	44	−9	51	
9	Morava Vladičin Han	34	15	5	14	38	43	−5	50	
10	Timok	34	13	11	10	52	32	+20	50	
11	OFK Niš	34	14	7	13	55	52	+3	49	
12	Rudar Aleksinac	34	13	9	12	50	47	+3	48	
13	Jedinstvo Paraćin (R)	34	12	7	15	43	57	−14	43	Relegation to Zone League
14	Bor (R)	34	11	9	14	40	41	−1	42	Relegation to Zone League
15	Topličanin (R)	34	10	12	12	49	60	−11	41	Relegation to Zone League
16	Car Konstantin (R)	34	9	7	18	49	65	−16	34	Relegation to Zone League
17	Đerdap (R)	34	7	3	24	40	76	−36	24	Relegation to Zone League
18	Kosanica (R)	34	2	5	27	20	101	−81	11	Relegation to Zone League

Source: srbijasport.net
Rules for classification: 1) points; 2) goal difference; 3) number of goals scored.
(C) Champions; (P) Promoted; (R) Relegated
