= Miloš Stojanović (footballer, born 1984) =

Serbian footballer

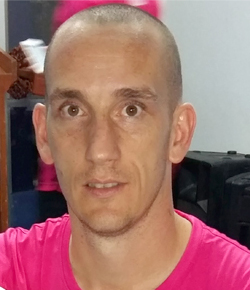
- Stojanović in 2017

Personal information
- Full name: Miloš Stojanović
- Date of birth: December 25, 1984 (age 41)
- Place of birth: Knjaževac, SR Serbia, SFR Yugoslavia
- Height: 1.83 m (6 ft 0 in)
- Position: Striker

Team information
- Current team: Timočanin

Youth career
- Timočanin

Senior career*
Years	Team	Apps	(Gls)
2002–2004	Jedinstvo Paraćin		
2005	Radnički Niš	26	(2)
2006	Radnik Bijeljina	22	(5)
2007	Slavija Sarajevo	5	(0)
2007–2009	Jagodina	29	(3)
2009–2010	Novi Pazar	33	(9)
2010	ViOn Zlaté Moravce	15	(1)
2011–2013	Jagodina	70	(24)
2013	Wuhan Zall	8	(2)
2014–2015	Gyeongnam FC	53	(16)
2016	Busan IPark	15	(2)
2017	Pattaya United	31	(15)
2018	Udon Thani	22	(5)
2019	Zlatibor Čajetina	6	(2)
2019–	Timočanin		
- * Club domestic league appearances and goals as of 19 May 2019

Miloš Stojanović (Serbian Cyrillic: Милош Cтojaнoвић, pronounced [mǐloʃ stojǎːnoʋitɕ]; born 25 December 1984), nicknamed Popaj (Popeye), is a Serbian footballer who plays as a striker for Timočanin.

== Club career ==
After having played in clubs such as Radnički Niš, FK Radnik Bijeljina and FK Slavija Sarajevo, he managed to achieve promotion to Serbian SuperLiga in his first season with ambitious FK Jagodina in 2008. In that season he managed to play 14 matches in the top league, but failed to score, deciding at the end of the season to move to FK Novi Pazar, thus returning to second league. After all, the decision came out to be the right one, because he ended up being an important player and one of the best scorers of the team with 9 goals in 33 matches. It was then, in summer 2010, that he decided to move abroad and signed with Slovak Superliga club FC ViOn Zlaté Moravce.

In 2011, he returned to Jagodina, where he had instant success, finishing fourth, Jagodina had managed to secure their first European competition, having played in the 1. qualification round for the Europa League. In 2013, he became the best scorer of the Serbian Super League, and led his team to glory, as Jagodina won the Serbian Cup.

On 12 June 2013, Stojanović signed by Chinese Super League side Wuhan Zall on an 18-month deal. He was transferred to Gyeongnam FC on 2014, and scored his first goal against Chunnam Dragons on March 22.

== Career statistics ==
Appearances and goals by club, season and competition
Club	Season	League			National cup		League cup		Continental		Other		Total	
Club	Season	Division	Apps	Goals	Apps	Goals	Apps	Goals	Apps	Goals	Apps	Goals	Apps	Goals
Slavija Sarajevo	2006–07	Bosnian Premier League	5	0	0	0	—		—		—		5	0
Jagodina	2007–08	Serbian First League	15	3	0	0	—		—		—		15	3
Jagodina	2008–09	Serbian SuperLiga	14	0	0	0	—		—		—		14	0
Jagodina	Total		29	3	0	0	—		—		—		29	3
Novi Pazar	2009–10	Serbian First League	33	9	0	0	—		—		—		33	9
ViOn Zlaté Moravce	2010–11	Slovak Superliga	15	1	0	0	—		—		—		15	1
Jagodina	2010–11	Serbian SuperLiga	12	1	0	0	—		—		—		12	1
Jagodina	2011–12	Serbian SuperLiga	28	4	0	0	—		—		—		28	4
Jagodina	2012–13	Serbian SuperLiga	30	19	6	1	—		2	0	—		38	20
Jagodina	Total		70	24	6	1	—		2	0	—		78	25
Wuhan Zall	2013	Chinese Super League	8	2	0	0	—		—		—		12	0
Gyeongnam FC	2014	K League Classic	30	7	1	0	—		—		2	1	33	8
Gyeongnam FC	2015	K League Challenge	23	9	0	0	—		—		—		23	9
Gyeongnam FC	Total		53	16	1	0	—		—		2	1	56	17
Busan IPark	2016	K League Challenge	15	2	2	0	—		—		—		17	2
Pattaya United	2017	Thai League	31	15	0	0	0	0	—		—		31	5
Udon Thani	2018	Thai League 2	22	5	0	0	0	0	—		—		22	5
Zlatibor Čajetina	2018–19	Serbian First League	6	2	—		—		—		0	0	6	2
Career total			287	79	9	1	0	0	2	0	2	1	300	80

== Honours ==
Jagodina

- Serbian Cup: 2013

Individual

- Serbian SuperLiga top scorer: 2012–13
