= Matthew Byrne =

Matthew Byrne may refer to:

- Matthew Byrne (soccer)
- Matthew Byrne (musician)
- Matt Byrne, British wheelchair basketball player
- Matthew R. Byrne, United States district judge of the United States District Court for the Southern District of Ohio
