= Milan Milinković =

Serbian footballer

Personal information
- Full name: Milan Milinković
- Date of birth: 4 May 1992 (age 34)
- Place of birth: Arilje, FR Yugoslavia
- Height: 1.82 m (5 ft 11 1/2 in)
- Position: Right-back

Youth career
- Budućnost Arilje
- Partizan
- Obilić

Senior career*
Years	Team	Apps	(Gls)
2010–2012	Javor Ivanjica	39	(0)
2013–2015	Jagodina	67	(0)
2016	Vojvodina	1	(0)
2016–2017	Radnik Surdulica	15	(0)

International career
2013	Serbia U-21	1	(0)
- * Club domestic league appearances and goals

Milan Milinković (Serbian Cyrillic: Милан Милинковић; born 4 May 1992) is a former Serbian football defender.

== Club career ==
Speedy right-back began in local club Budućnost Arilje, but was observed by Partizan scouts, and continued his football education in black-white jersey. As a youngster he played for Obilić, too. He started his professional career in Javor Ivanjica and after 3 season, he moved to Jagodina.

== Statistics ==
As of 14 December 2016

Club	Season	League		Cup		Europe		Other		Total	
Club	Season	Apps	Goals	Apps	Goals	Apps	Goals	Apps	Goals	Apps	Goals
Javor Ivanjica	2009–10	1	0	0	0	0	0	0	0	1	0
Javor Ivanjica	2010–11	14	0	0	0	0	0	0	0	14	0
Javor Ivanjica	2011–12	18	0	2	0	0	0	0	0	20	0
Javor Ivanjica	2012–13	6	0	3	0	0	0	0	0	9	0
Javor Ivanjica	Total	39	0	5	0	0	0	0	0	44	0
Jagodina	2012–13	4	0	0	0	0	0	0	0	4	0
Jagodina	2013–14	22	0	6	0	0	0	0	0	28	0
Jagodina	2014–15	24	0	3	0	2	0	0	0	29	0
Jagodina	2015–16	17	0	1	0	0	0	0	0	18	0
Jagodina	Total	67	0	10	0	2	0	0	0	79	0
Vojvodina	2015–16	1	0	0	0	0	0	0	0	1	0
Vojvodina	Total	1	0	0	0	0	0	0	0	1	0
Radnik Surdulica	2016–17	15	0	0	0	0	0	0	0	15	0
Radnik Surdulica	Total	15	0	0	0	0	0	0	0	15	0
Career total		122	0	15	0	2	0	0	0	139	0

== International career ==
He played for Serbian youth team (U21) in the regional league game against the national team of Montenegro.
