= Dragan Đurđević =

Serbian footballer and manager

Personal information
- Date of birth: 18 April 1981 (age 45)
- Place of birth: Serbia
- Height: 1.93 m (6 ft 4 in)
- Position: Forward

Youth career
- Jagodina

Senior career*
Years	Team	Apps	(Gls)
- Jagodina
- Jedinstvo Paraćin
- Čukarički
2002-2003	Radnički Niš	10	(0)
- Olimpik Sarajevo
2007-2008	Ordabasy	42	(7)
2009	Jagodina	2	(0)
2010	Kairat	28	(2)
2011	Andijon	10	(0)

Managerial career
- 2013: Taraz (assistant)
- 2016: Jagodina (caretaker)
- 2016-2018: Atyrau (director)
- 2020: Samut Sakhon
- 2021: Jonava
- 2021: Jagodina
- 2023: Marsaxlokk
- 2024: Ordabasy (assistant)
- * Club domestic league appearances and goals

Dragan Đurđević (born 18 April 1981) is a Serbian football manager and former player, who most recently managed Jonava.

== Playing career ==
Before the 2007 season, Đurđević signed for Kazakhstani side Ordabasy after playing for Olimpik (Sarajevo) in Bosnia and Herzegovina, where he made 48 appearances and scored 9 goals.

Before the second half of 2008–09, he signed for the Serbian club Jagodina.

Before the 2011 season, Đurđević signed for Andijon in Uzbekistan after playing for the Kazakhstani team Kairat.

== Managerial career ==
After retirement, he was appointed assistant manager of Taraz in Kazakhstan.

In 2016, he was appointed manager of the Serbian outfit Jagodina.

Before the 2020 season, Đurđević was appointed manager of Samut Sakhon in the Thai second division after working as director of the Kazakhstani side, Atyrau.

In 2021, he was appointed manager of Jonava in the Lithuanian second division.
