= Vukašin Tomić =

Serbian footballer

Personal information
- Full name: Vukašin Tomić
- Date of birth: 8 April 1987 (age 39)
- Place of birth: Kruševac, SFR Yugoslavia
- Height: 1.98 m (6 ft 6 in)
- Position: Centre back

Team information
- Current team: Timočanin

Senior career*
Years	Team	Apps	(Gls)
2005–2008	Napredak Kruševac	0	(0)
2005–2006	→ Trayal Kruševac (loan)		
2006–2008	→ Kopaonik Brus (loan)		
2008–2010	Jagodina	25	(0)
2010	→ Mladost Lučani (loan)	15	(1)
2010	Mladost Lučani	15	(0)
2011–2013	Jagodina	54	(1)
2013	→ Taraz (loan)	12	(0)
2014	Universitatea Craiova	2	(0)
2014	Napredak Kruševac	4	(0)
2015	Flamurtari Vlorë	8	(0)
2015	Radnik Surdulica	1	(0)
2016	Spartak Subotica	9	(0)
2016	Jagodina	13	(0)
2017	Atyrau	2	(0)
2018	FK Temnić 1924	11	(0)
2018	Gandzasar Kapan	3	(0)
2019–2020	Víkingur Gøta	31	(2)
2021-2022	Jedinstvo Paraćin		
2022	Skála		
2023	FK Meševo Kruševac		
2024–2025	Timočanin		

Managerial career
- 2024-2025: Timočanin
- * Club domestic league appearances and goals as of 21 June 2017

Vukašin Tomić (Serbian Cyrillic: Bукaшин Томић; born 8 April 1987 in Kruševac) is a Serbian footballer who plays for Timočanin.

== Career ==
=== Flamurtari ===
In January 2015 Tomić signed an 18-month contract with Albanian Superliga side Flamurtari Vlorë, becoming the first Serbian player to play for the club.

Following a run of poor performances, Tomić was released by the club alongside Baćo Nikolić and Yani Urdinov on 16 April 2015.

Tomić joined Faroes side Víkingur Gøta in 2019, alongside compatriot Milan Svojić.
