= Pomoravlje-Timok Zone League =

- Founded: 2007
- Folded: 2014
- Country: Serbia
- Number of clubs: 16 (2010–2014); 18 (2007–2010)
- Level on pyramid: 4
- Promotion to: Serbian League East
- Relegation to: Bor District League; Pomoravlje District League; Rasina District League; Zaječar District League
- Domestic cup: Serbian Cup
- Last champions: Bor (2013–14)

Pomoravlje-Timok Zone League (Serbian: Поморавско-тимочка зона / Pomoravsko-timočka zona) was one of the Serbian Zone League divisions, the fourth tier of the Serbian football league system. It was run by the Football Association of East Serbia.

Founded in 2007, the league was folded in 2014, together with the Niš Zone League. Three new sections were established instead, namely Zone League East, Zone League South and Zone League West.

== Seasons ==
Season	Winner	Runner-up
2007–08	Hajduk Veljko	Jedinstvo Paraćin
2008–09	Radnički Svilajnac	Đerdap
2009–10	Sloga Despotovac	Trstenik
2010–11	Trgovački Jagodina	Borac Bivolje
2011–12	Morava Ćuprija	Jedinstvo Paraćin
2012–13	Timočanin	Đerdap
2013–14	Bor	Ozren Sokobanja
