= Milo Mićunović =

Serbian footballer

Personal information
- Full name: Milo Mićunović
- Date of birth: 25 June 1992 (age 34)
- Place of birth: Smederevska Palanka, FR Yugoslavia
- Height: 1.77 m (5 ft 10 in)
- Position: Forward

Team information
- Current team: FK Mladi Borac Sedlare

Youth career
- 2005–2010: Red Star Belgrade

Senior career*
Years	Team	Apps	(Gls)
2010–2012	Jagodina	1	(0)
2012	→ Sloga Despotovac (loan)	13	(2)
2012–2014	Tabane Trgovački	50	(19)
2014–2016	Car Konstantin	32	(12)
2016–2017	Tabane 1970	29	(21)
2017–2018	Car Konstantin	21	(12)
2018	Isloch Minsk Raion	9	(1)
2020–2021	Jagodina	24	(1)
2021–2022	Radnički Svilajnac	24	(14)
2022–2024	FK Orlovi Jasenovo	53	(38)
	Sedlare	51	(31)
- * Club domestic league appearances and goals as of 31 May 2021

Milo Mićunović (Serbian Cyrillic: Мило Мићуновић; born 25 June 1992) is a Serbian footballer who plays as a midfielder for FK Mladi Borac Sedlare.
