= FK Timočanin =

Serbian football club

Timočanin
- Full name: Fudbalski Klub Timočanin
- Founded: 1921; 105 years ago
- Ground: Knjaževac City Stadium
- Capacity: 670
- President: Miloš Stojanović
- Head coach: Vukašin Tomić
- League: Zone League East
- 2024–25: Zone League East, 2nd
Home colours	Away colours

FK Timočanin (Serbian Cyrillic: ФК Тимочанин) is a football club based in Knjaževac, Serbia. They compete in the Zone League East, the fourth tier of the national league system.

== History ==
After winning the Pomoravlje-Timok Zone League in the 2012–13 season, the club was promoted to the Serbian League East. They subsequently placed 10th in the 2013–14 campaign. After spending three seasons in the third tier of Serbian football, the club finished second from the bottom in the 2015–16 Serbian League East and suffered relegation to the Zone League East.

The club returned to the Serbian League East after winning the Zone League East in 2019. They marked their 100th anniversary in December 2021.

=== Recent league history ===
Season	Division	P	W	D	L	F	A	Pts	Pos
2020–21	3 - Serbian League East	38	18	10	10	78	36	64	8th
2021–22	3 - Serbian League East	28	12	5	11	46	42	41	7th
2022–23	3 - Serbian League East	30	12	9	9	52	52	45	6th
2023–24	3 - Serbian League East	30	6	3	21	45	64	16 (Note: The club was docked five points.)	15th
2024–25	4 - Zone League East	27	21	2	4	88	24	65	2nd

== Honours ==
Pomoravlje-Timok Zone League / Zone League East (Tier 4)

- 2012–13 / 2018–19

== Notable players ==
For a list of all FK Timočanin players with a Wikipedia article, see Category:FK Timočanin players.

=== Historical list of coaches ===
- (Serbia) Milun Sakić (2012–2013)
- (Serbia) Branko Božović (2013–2014)
- (Serbia) Dejan Dragnjević (2014)
- (Serbia) Ljubinko Vulović (2015)
- (Serbia) Nenad Grozdić (2015)
- (Serbia) Vojkan Aleksić (2015)
- (Serbia) Milan Dimoski (2016)
- (Serbia) Slobodan Antonijević
- (Serbia) Slađan Ćirić
- (Serbia) Goran Đukić (2018–2019)
- (Serbia) Dragan Ilić (2019)
- (Serbia) Miodrag Starčević (2019–2020)
- (Serbia) Nikola Veljković (2020–2022)
- (Serbia) Miljan Đurović (2022)
- (Serbia) Nikola Veljković (2023–2024)
- (Serbia) Marko Vidojević (2024)
- (Serbia) Vukašin Tomić (2024-2025)
- (Serbia) Nikola Veljković (2025-)
