= Jacques Tabi =

Cameroonian footballer

Personal information
- Full name: Jacques Ekangue Tabi
- Date of birth: 22 January 1988 (age 38)
- Place of birth: Douala, Cameroon
- Position: Midfielder

Senior career*
Years	Team	Apps	(Gls)
2006–2008	Douala Athletic Club		
2008–2011	Sable FC		
2012	Al-Ahly Dubai		
2013	Hajduk Kula	1	(0)

International career^{‡}
2007	Cameroon U-20		
- * Club domestic league appearances and goals as of 5 May 2013 ‡ National team caps and goals as of 5 May 2013

Jacques Ekangue Tabi (born 22 January 1988) is a Cameroonian footballer playing last with FK Hajduk Kula in the Serbian SuperLiga.

== Club career ==
He played in Cameroon with Douala AC and Sable FC before moving to the United Arab Emirates and play with Al Ahli Club (Dubai) during 2012. During the winter break of the 2012–13 season he moved to Serbia and signed with FK Hajduk Kula. He made his debut in the SuperLiga on April 3, 2013, in an away match against Red Star Belgrade.

== National team ==
Tabi was part of the Cameroon U-20 national team that played in the 2007 CAN juniors tournament.

Two years later, he would be part of the Cameroon national team in a preparation match against R.D. Congo for the 2009 African Nations Championship.
