= Branko Božović =

Serbian football manager and player

Personal information
- Date of birth: 21 October 1969 (age 57)
- Place of birth: Čačak, SR Serbia, SFR Yugoslavia
- Position: Defender

Youth career
- Borac Čačak

Senior career*
Years	Team	Apps	(Gls)
1988–1991	Borac Čačak	42	(6)
1991–1993	Budućnost Titograd	44	(0)
1993–1995	Borac Čačak	15 (Note: 1994-95 season stats only)	(1)
1995	Vojvodina	3	(0)
1996	Ulsan Hyundai	9	(0)
1997	Borac Čačak	13	(0)
1998–2000	Železnik	24	(2)
1999	Philadelphia KiXX (indoor)	7	(0)
2002–2003	Borac Čačak		
2004–2005	Sevojno		
Total		157+	(9+)

International career
1985	Yugoslavia U16 (Note: Official UEFA matches only)	1	(0)
1991	Yugoslavia U21	1	(0)

Managerial career
- Borac Čačak (assistant)
- 2011: Mladost Lučani
- Takovo
- 2013–2014: Timočanin
- 2015: Polet Ljubić
- Interclube (assistant)
- 2017: Polet Ljubić
- 2017–2019: Inner Mongolia Caoshangfei
- 2022: King Faisal Babes
- * Club domestic league appearances and goals

Branko Božović (Serbian Cyrillic: Бранко Божовић; born 21 October 1969) is a Serbian football manager and former player.

== Club career ==
Božović started out with Borac Čačak and played in the Yugoslav Second League for two seasons (1988–89 and 1990–91). He subsequently played for Budućnost Titograd in the 1991–92 Yugoslav First League. Later on, Božović also played indoor soccer in the United States.

== International career ==
At international level, Božović represented Yugoslavia at under-16 and under-21 categories.

== Managerial career ==
After hanging up his boots, Božović served as manager of several clubs in his homeland, including Mladost Lučani, Takovo, and Timočanin. He was also manager of Polet Ljubić on two occasions. He worked as an assistant to head coach Veselin Jelušić at Angolan side Interclube.

In April 2022, Božović was appointed as manager of Ghana Premier League club King Faisal. He parted ways with them in October of the same year.
