= Noé Kwin =

Cameroonian footballer

Personal information
- Full name: Noé Achille Kwin Amban
- Date of birth: 14 January 1990 (age 36)
- Place of birth: Douala, Cameroon
- Height: 1.84 m (6 ft 0 in)
- Positions: Centre back; midfielder

Youth career
- Jeunesse de Bonamoussadi

Senior career*
Years	Team	Apps	(Gls)
2010–2012	Coton Sport		
2013	Spartak Subotica	0	(0)
2013–2018	DAC Dunajská Streda	85	(4)
2019	ViOn Zlaté Moravce	12	(1)
- * Club domestic league appearances and goals as of 31 May 2019

Noé Achille Kwin Amban, born 14 January 1990, commonly known as Noé Kwin, is a Cameroonian football defender.

== Early career ==
He started playing with Jeunesse de Bonamoussadi. Then he played with Coton Sport since 2010 and has won the Elite One in 2010–11. In the winter break of the 2012–13 season, he joined Serbian side FK Spartak Subotica. He failed to make any appearance in the Serbian SuperLiga and got released in March 2013.

== DAC Dunajská Streda ==
In the summer of 2013, he joined Slovak side DAC Dunajská Streda and made his debut in a Corgoň Liga match against Košice on September 14, 2013.

== Honours ==
Cotonspor

- Elite One: 2010–11
