= Kojo Kankam =

Ghanaian football defensive midfielder (born 1992)

Personal information
- Full name: Kojo Kankam
- Date of birth: 26 November 1992 (age 33)
- Place of birth: Kumasi, Ghana
- Height: 1.90 m (6 ft 3 in)
- Positions: Midfielder; defender

Senior career*
Years	Team	Apps	(Gls)
2010–2011	Asante Kotoko		
2011–2013	Ebusua Dwarfs		
2013–2015	Radnički Niš	1	(0)

International career
	Ghana U-20	5	(4)
- * Club domestic league appearances and goals as of 3 June 2014

Kojo Kankam (born 26 November 1992) is a Ghanaian football defensive midfielder and center defender.

== Club career ==
He played for Ghanaian clubs Asante Kotoko and Ebusua Dwarfs.

=== Radnički Niš ===
At the beginning of 2013, he arrived on trial at Radnički Niš. He made his Jelen SuperLiga debut for Radnički Niš in the last fixture of season 2012–13.
