= Damjan Marčeta =

Serbian footballer (born 1994)

Personal information
- Date of birth: 11 May 1994 (age 32)
- Place of birth: Sanski Most, Bosnia and Herzegovina
- Height: 1.94 m (6 ft 4 in)
- Position: Forward

Team information
- Current team: Eintracht Trier
- Number: 11

Youth career
- Vojvodina

Senior career*
Years	Team	Apps	(Gls)
2013–2014	Donji Srem	32	(1)
2015	FC Tempo Frankfurt		
2016	Rot-Weiss Frankfurt	10	(3)
2016	FC Tempo Frankfurt		
2017–2019	FC Gießen (Note: "Teutonia Watzenborn-Steinburg" until 2018)	62	(45)
2018	FC Gießen II	0	(0)
2019–2022	FC Homburg	72	(20)
2022–2023	SV Rödinghausen	43	(16)
2023–2024	Wuppertaler SV	32	(11)
2024–	Eintracht Trier	51	(19)
- * Club domestic league appearances and goals as of 24 September 2026

Damjan Marčeta (born 11 May 1994) is a Serbian footballer who plays as a forward for Regionalliga club Eintracht Trier.

== Career ==
Marčeta is product of Vojvodina's youth school. He was loaned at Prvi Maj Ruma but did not play for first team of Vojvodina. He joined Donji Srem in 2013. He scored his first goal for Donji Srem in an 2–2 draw in the Serbian SuperLiga on 15 September 2013 away to Red Star Belgrade.

In November 2015, Marčeta moved to Germany and joined FC Tempo in Frankfurt. In the beginning of 2016, he then Rot-Weiss Frankfurt after scoring two goals for the club's reserve team in his debut. He played 11 league games and scored four goals. In the summer 2016, he went on a trial with Kickers Offenbach. After scoring seven goals within 45 minutes in a friendly game for the club, Kickers Offenbach revealed that they wanted to sign him. He agreed to sign with the club and they offered him a contract until June 2018, but however, Marčeta had no work permit in Germany and the deal was never finalized. He then returned to FC Tempo.

In January 2017 Marčeta moved to SC Teutonia Watzenborn-Steinberg. The club changed name to FC Gießen on 1 July 2018. He was part of the team winning the 2018–19 Hessenliga, in which Marčeta contributed with 25 goals in 26 appearances. After his successful season, he moved to FC Homburg in 2019. On 28 January 2022, he joined Regionalliga West club SV Rödinghausen.

On 18 May 2023, Wuppertaler SV announced the signing of Marčeta.

== Career statistics ==
As of 24 December 2014

Appearances and goals by club, season and competition
Club	Season	League		Cup		Europe		Other		Total	
Club	Season	Apps	Goals	Apps	Goals	Apps	Goals	Apps	Goals	Apps	Goals
Donji Srem	2012–13	3	0	0	0	0	0	0	0	3	0
Donji Srem	2013–14	17	1	3	1	0	0	0	0	20	2
Donji Srem	2014–15	12	0	1	0	0	0	0	0	13	0
Donji Srem	Total	32	1	4	1	0	0	0	0	36	2
Career total		32	1	4	1	0	0	0	0	36	2

== Honours ==
FC Gießen

- Hessenliga: 2018–19
