= Igor Pavlović =

Serbian footballer

Personal information
- Full name: Igor Pavlović
- Date of birth: 7 June 1986 (age 40)
- Place of birth: Svetozarevo, SFR Yugoslavia
- Height: 1.94 m (6 ft 4 in)
- Position: Centre-forward

Youth career
- Jedinstvo Paraćin

Senior career*
Years	Team	Apps	(Gls)
2004	Jagodina		
2004–2007	Napredak Kruševac	8	(1)
2005–2006	→ Kopaonik Brus (loan)		
2007–2009	Jagodina	62	(20)
2009–2010	Novi Pazar	27	(7)
2010	Kozármisleny SE	9	(2)
2011	KSZO Ostrowiec	11	(3)
2011	Kukësi		
2012	Pelister		
2012	Mačva Šabac	10	(1)
2013	Sileks	7	(2)
2013	Tabane Trgovački	12	(3)
2014	Sloga Batočina		
2014	Jedinstvo Paraćin		
2015	Đerdap Kladovo	11	(4)
2015–2018	Temnić 1924	60	(40)
- * Club domestic league appearances and goals

Igor Pavlović (Serbian Cyrillic: Игор Павловић; born 7 June 1986) is a Serbian retired footballer who played as a centre-forward.

== Club career ==
Born in Jagodina (formerly known as Svetozarevo), Pavlović came through the Jedinstvo Paraćin youth academy. He started his senior career in his hometown in the club with same name. Later he also played with Napredak Kruševac and Novi Pazar in Serbia before moving to Hungarian side Kozármisleny SE in summer 2010. Previously, Pavlović awarded for the strongest shot in the Serbian SuperLiga in May 2009. In February 2011, he signed a one-and-a-half-year contract with KSZO Ostrowiec. Following his spell in Poland, he had a half season spells with Albanian side Kukësi, Macedonian Pelister, Serbian Mačva Šabac and Macedonian Sileks. In summer 2013 he returned to Serbia and joined a third-tier side OFK Tabane Trgovački, which had just been formed by the merge of OFK Tabane, and the FK Jagodina farm team FK Trgovački Jagodina. While with Pelister, he won the Second Macedonian Football League. After a spell in Tabane, Pavlović played with Sloga Batočina, Jedinstvo Paraćin and Đerdap Kladovo for a hal-season at each. In summer 2015, Pavlović joined Temnić. After he spent a short spell on loan with Romanian side Ungheni in early 2017, Pavlović returned to Temnić. Scoring 25 goals on 18 matches in the Serbian League East, he was elected for the best league scorer for the 2016–17 season, helping the team to make promotion in the Serbian First League.

== Honours ==
Pelister

- Macedonian Second League: 2011–12

Temnić

- Serbian League West: 2016–17

Individual

- Serbian League West best scorer: 2016–17
