= Zone League East =

- Founded: 2014
- Country: Serbia
- Confederation: UEFA
- Number of clubs: 12
- Level on pyramid: 4
- Promotion to: Serbian League East
- Relegation to: Nišava District League; Bor District League; Zaječar District League
- Domestic cup: Serbian Cup
- Current champions: Bor 1919 (2024-25)
- Website: http://www.fsris.org.rs/
- Current: 2024–25 Zone League East

Zone League East is the fourth-highest football league in Serbia. The league is operated by the Football Association of Eastern Serbia Region.

The league consists of 12 clubs that play each other in a double round-robin league, with each club playing the other clubs at both home and away games. At the end of the season the top club will be promoted to Serbian League East.

== Winners ==
Season	Winner	Runner-up
2014–15	Dunav Prahovo	Svrljig
2015–16	Pukovac	Šarbanovac
2016–17	Rtanj	Šarbanovac
2017–18	Zaplanjac	Bukovik
2018–19	Timočanin	Timok
2019–20	Canceled due to the COVID-19 pandemic	
2020–21	Hajduk Veljko	FK Bor
2021–22	Dunav Prahovo	Tanasko Rajic
2022–23	Đerdap	Balkanski
2023–24	Timok	Bor 1919
2024–25	Bor 1919	Timočanin
