= 2007–08 Serbian First League =

Serbian First League
- Season: 2007–08
- Champions: Javor Ivanjica
- Promoted: Javor Ivanjica; Jagodina; Rad
- Relegated: Radnički Pirot; Mladenovac; Vlasina; Zemun; Radnički Niš
- Top goalscorer: Igor Pavlović (17 goals)

The 2007–08 Serbian First League (referred to as the Prva Liga Telekom Srbija for sponsorship reasons) was the third season of the league under its current title.

== League table ==
Pos	Team	Pld	W	D	L	GF	GA	GD	Pts	Qualification or relegation
1	Javor Ivanjica (C, P)	34	18	16	0	38	12	+26	70	Promotion to Serbian SuperLiga
2	Jagodina (P)	34	15	13	6	37	19	+18	58	Promotion to Serbian SuperLiga
3	BSK Borča	34	17	7	10	38	21	+17	58	Qualification for promotion play-offs
4	Rad (P)	34	16	9	9	50	34	+16	57	Qualification for promotion play-offs
5	Voždovac	34	16	9	9	39	27	+12	57	Qualification for promotion play-offs
6	Metalac Gornji Milanovac	34	13	10	11	33	26	+7	49	Qualification for promotion play-offs
7	Srem	34	14	5	15	43	41	+2	47	
8	Mladost Apatin	34	13	8	13	30	31	−1	47	
9	ČSK Čelarevo	34	11	13	10	34	29	+5	46	
10	Novi Sad	34	12	10	12	31	30	+1	46	
11	Sevojno	34	11	12	11	34	34	0	45	
12	Novi Pazar	34	12	9	13	29	39	−10	45	
13	Hajduk Beograd	34	12	8	14	28	33	−5	44	
14	Radnički Niš (R)	34	11	10	13	29	31	−2	43	Qualification for relegation play-offs
15	Zemun (R)	34	10	12	12	28	40	−12	42	Relegation to Serbian League
16	Vlasina (R)	34	9	10	15	35	47	−12	37	Relegation to Serbian League
17	Mladenovac (R)	34	7	9	18	28	51	−23	30	Relegation to Serbian League
18	Radnički Pirot (R)	34	1	6	27	16	55	−39	9	Relegation to Serbian League

Source: srbijasport.net
Rules for classification: 1) points; 2) goal difference; 3) number of goals scored.
(C) Champions; (P) Promoted; (R) Relegated

== Results ==
Home \ Away	BSK	ČSK	HBE	JAG	JAV	MLA	MAP	MET	NPZ	NSD	RAD	RNI	RPI	SEV	SRM	VOŽ	VLA	ZEM
BSK Borča		1–1	0–1	0–1	0–1	2–0	1–0	0–1	2–0	0–0	2–0	1–0	3–0	2–0	0–0	2–0	0–0	2–0
ČSK Čelarevo	0–1		2–0	1–1	0–0	1–1	0–0	1–0	3–0	1–0	1–1	0–0	1–1	1–0	3–0	2–0	0–0	0–0
Hajduk Beograd	1–2	0–1		1–0	1–1	3–1	1–0	1–0	2–2	2–0	2–1	0–0	2–1	1–1	0–1	1–0	3–2	0–0
Jagodina	1–1	1–0	3–1		1–1	3–0	2–1	0–0	3–0	2–1	2–0	3–0	1–0	0–1	2–0	0–0	3–1	2–1
Javor Ivanjica	0–0	2–1	2–0	0–0		1–0	3–2	1–0	1–1	2–0	2–1	3–0	2–0	0–0	1–0	1–0	2–0	4–2
Mladenovac	0–2	1–2	1–0	0–0	1–1		1–1	3–1	0–1	2–1	2–4	1–1	1–0	2–1	2–2	0–0	1–1	1–2
Mladost Apatin	0–3	0–1	1–0	0–0	0–0	2–0		1–0	2–0	1–0	0–0	0–0	2–0	1–1	2–0	2–1	1–1	2–0
Metalac G.M.	2–0	3–1	1–0	1–0	1–1	2–0	0–1		2–0	1–1	1–1	1–0	1–0	1–1	0–0	1–1	1–2	1–1
Novi Pazar	1–2	1–1	0–0	2–0	0–2	1–0	1–2	1–0		2–1	1–0	1–0	2–1	0–0	2–0	1–0	1–1	4–1
Novi Sad	1–0	1–1	0–0	1–1	0–0	1–0	3–0	2–1	3–0		2–0	2–0	1–0	1–1	0–0	0–0	0–0	1–0
Rad	2–0	3–2	2–0	0–0	1–1	1–0	2–1	1–1	2–3	2–0		0–0	3–1	3–0	4–1	2–0	3–2	1–1
Radnički Niš	1–1	1–0	1–0	0–0	0–1	6–0	2–0	0–0	1–0	3–0	0–2		2–1	3–1	1–0	0–0	4–2	1–1
Radnički Pirot	0–2	0–1	0–0	0–1	0–0	0–1	0–2	0–1	1–1	1–3	1–0	0–2		0–1	1–3	1–2	2–3	1–2
Sevojno	3–1	3–1	0–1	0–0	0–0	3–0	2–1	0–3	0–0	0–1	2–1	2–0	2–1		4–0	1–1	0–0	0–0
Srem	0–2	2–1	2–3	2–0	0–1	1–1	4–1	0–1	2–0	3–1	0–1	3–0	4–1	3–1		0–1	3–1	2–0
Voždovac	1–0	2–1	2–1	1–1	0–0	1–0	0–1	3–1	3–0	3–1	1–1	1–0	3–1	3–1	2–1		1–0	1–0
Vlasina	1–2	2–1	1–0	1–3	0–1	2–1	1–0	0–2	1–0	0–2	1–2	3–0	0–0	1–2	0–2	3–2		1–1
Zemun	2–1	1–1	2–0	1–0	0–0	1–4	1–0	2–1	0–0	1–0	1–3	1–0	0–0	1–0	1–2	0–3	1–1	

Legend: Blue = home team win; Yellow = draw; Red = away team win.

== Playoffs ==
=== 3rd to 6th place playoffs ===
First round
3	BSK Borča (p)	0 (5)
6	Metalac Gornji Milanovac	0 (4)
4	Rad (p)	1 (3)
5	Voždovac	1 (1)

Final round
3	BSK Borča	0 (2)
4	Rad (p)	0 (4)

=== Promotion playoffs ===
Final round
4	Rad	3	1	4
10 (I)	Smederevo	1	2	3

=== Relegation playoffs ===
Final round
2 (III)	Inđija	2	1	3
14	Radnički Niš	0	1	1

== Top scorers ==
Rank	Scorer	Club	Goals
1	(Serbia) Igor Pavlović	Jagodina	17
2	(Serbia) Miloš Bogunović	Rad	13
2	(Serbia) Vladimir Savićević	Srem	13
2	(Serbia) Rade Veljović	Voždovac	13
5	(Serbia) Milorad Perović	Mladenovac	9
5	(Serbia) Nikola Vujošević	Zemun	9
7	(Bosnia and Herzegovina) Vladan Kujundžić	Metalac Gornji Milanovac	8
7	(Serbia) Rade Medić	Mladost Apatin	8
7	(Serbia) Asmir Misini	ČSK Čelarevo	8
7	(Serbia) Dalibor Mitrović	Rad	8
