= Srđan Ajković =

Montenegrin footballer

Personal information
- Full name: Srđan Ajković
- Date of birth: 15 October 1991 (age 35)
- Place of birth: Titograd, SFR Yugoslavia
- Height: 1.79 m (5 ft 10 in)
- Position: Left winger

Youth career
- –2008: Zeta

Senior career*
Years	Team	Apps	(Gls)
2008–2009	Zeta	10	(1)
2009–2012	Rad	5	(0)
2011	→ Lovćen (loan)	6	(0)
2013	BSK Borča	25	(3)
2014–2015	Jedinstvo Užice	37	(6)
2015–2017	Zemun	30	(7)
2017	Grbalj	15	(2)
2017–2019	Rad	24	(1)
2019	Zvijezda 09	7	(0)

International career
2007–2009	Montenegro U19	7	(0)
- * Club domestic league appearances and goals as of 23 November 2019

Srđan Ajković (Serbian Cyrillic: Cpђaн Ajкoвић; born 15 October 1991) is a Montenegrin professional footballer who plays as a left winger. He most recently played for FK Zvijezda 09 in the Premier League of Bosnia and Herzegovina.

== Honours ==
=== Club ===
Grbalj

- Montenegrin Cup runner up: 2016–17
