= Matthew Byrne (soccer) =

Australian soccer player

Personal information
- Full name: Matthew Byrne
- Date of birth: 5 June 1992 (age 34)
- Place of birth: Brisbane, Australia
- Height: 1.82 m (5 ft 11 1/2 in)
- Position: Defender

Team information
- Current team: Souths United

Youth career
- Capalaba
- Brisbane Force
- 2009–2011: Brisbane Roar

Senior career*
Years	Team	Apps	(Gls)
2011	Rochedale Rovers	2	(2)
2012–2013	Donji Srem	14	(0)
2013	→ Teleoptik (loan)	5	(1)
2013–2015	Olympic FC	58	(5)
2016–2018	Moreton Bay United	71	(4)
2019	Eastern Suburbs	25	(2)
2020–	Souths United	10	(0)
- * Club domestic league appearances and goals as of 2 December 2020

Matthew Byrne (born 5 June 1992) is an Australian soccer midfielder last playing with Eastern Suburbs FC.

== Career ==
Born in Brisbane, he played with Mt Gravatt Hawks FC, Capalaba, Brisbane Force and Brisbane Roar youth teams In 2011 Byrne joined Rochdale Rovers and played with them in the 2011 Brisbane Premier League

In January 2012 he came to Serbia for trials and signed with FK Donji Srem. At the end of the season Donji Srem got promotion to the 2012–13 Serbian SuperLiga. Byrne played the first half of the season in the Serbian top tier having played 5 matches, and during the winter break he was loaned to FK Partizan farm club, FK Teleoptik, playing back in the second tier.

In summer 2013 he returned to Australia and joined Olympic FC. Having arrived from Serbia where he regularly played as right-back, during 2014, he made a big impression in the Olympic FC team as a central defender. His performances in the PlayStation 4 NPL Queensland have earned him a nomination for the Supporters’ Team of the Year, and, subsequently, Byrne was offered a new contract for the 2015 season, which he signed. In October 2014, Byrne received the Olympic FC's Senior Awards dinner at The Greek Club the award of the most consistent senior team player.
