= Ljubo Kovačević =

Serbian footballer

Personal information
- Full name: Ljubo Kovačević
- Date of birth: 8 September 1978 (age 48)
- Place of birth: Belgrade, SFR Yugoslavia
- Height: 1.83 m (6 ft 0 in)
- Position: Goalkeeper

Senior career*
| Years | Team | Apps | (Gls) |
| 2001–2003 | Grafičar Beograd | | |
| 2003–2004 | BSK Borča | 31 | (0) |
| 2004 | Radnički Obrenovac | 5 | (0) |
| 2005 | Loznica | 15 | (0) |
| 2005 | Radnički Pirot | 16 | (0) |
| 2006 | BÍ/Bolungarvík | 10 | (0) |
| 2007-2008 | Renova | 45 | (0) |
| 2008 | Zemun | 2 | (0) |
| 2008–2010 | Renova | 59 | (0) |
| 2010–2012 | BSK Borča | 64 | (0) |
| 2013 | Donji Srem | 3 | (0) |
| 2013 | Loznica | 15 | (0) |
| 2014–2015 | BSK Borča | 17 | (0) |
| 2016 | 011 Beograd | 0 | (0) |
- * Club domestic league appearances and goals as of 16 September 2016

Ljubo Kovačević (Serbian Cyrillic: Љубо Ковачевић; born 8 September 1978) is a Serbian retired football goalkeeper who last played for FK 011 Beograd.
