= Predrag Stamenković =

Serbian footballer

Personal information
- Full name: Predrag Stamenković
- Date of birth: July 7, 1977 (age 49)
- Place of birth: Niš, SFR Yugoslavia
- Height: 1.83 m (6 ft 0 in)
- Position: Right back

Senior career*
Years	Team	Apps	(Gls)
1999–2002	Radnički Niš	65	(5)
2002–2003	Mladost Apatin	14	(0)
2003–2004	OFK Niš	24	(2)
2004–2008	Radnički Niš	126	(4)
2008–2010	Smederevo	61	(3)
2010–2013	Radnički Niš	84	(3)

Managerial career
- 2017–2018: Sinđelić Niš
- 2019: Moravac Mrštane
- 2024: Mornar (asst.)
- 2024-: Al-Tai (asst.)
- * Club domestic league appearances and goals

Predrag Stamenković (Serbian Cyrillic: Предраг Стаменковић; born 7 July 1977) is a Serbian football defender.
