= Lazar Pavić =

Serbian footballer

Personal information
- Date of birth: 2 February 1994 (age 32)
- Place of birth: Belgrade, FR Yugoslavia
- Height: 1.77 m (5 ft 10 in)
- Position: Midfielder

Team information
- Current team: UFC Tadten
- Number: 11

Youth career
- Železničar Beograd
- –2012: Partizan

Senior career*
Years	Team	Apps	(Gls)
2012	Žarkovo	8	(0)
2013–2014	Smederevo	30	(0)
2014–2015	Legionovia Legionowo	25	(2)
2015	Zvijezda Gradačac	8	(0)
2016–2017	Sloga Petrovac	9	(0)
2017–2018	Smederevo		
2018–2020	Schönbrunn	39	(13)
2020–2023	FSV Velm	63	(14)
2023–	UFC Tadten	51	(7)

Managerial career
- 2019–2020: Schönbrunn U13
- * Club domestic league appearances and goals as of 15 March 2025

Lazar Pavić (Serbian Cyrillic: Лазар Павић; born 2 February 1994) is a Serbian professional football player who plays as a midfielder for Austrian club UFC Tadten.
