= FK Jagodina =

Jagodina
- Full name: Fudbalski klub Jagodina
- Nicknames: Ćurani (The Turkeys); Plavi (The Blues)
- Founded: 1919; 107 years ago as JSK Zora; 14 October 1962; 64 years ago (merger of three clubs: FK Morava, FK Jedinstvo and FK Kablovi)
- Dissolved: 2018
- Ground: Jagodina City Stadium
- Capacity: 9,997
- Coordinates: 43.9688°N 21.2684°E
- League: Serbian First League
- 2017–18: 16th of 16 (relegated)
Home colours	Away colours

Fudbalski klub Jagodina (Serbian Cyrillic: Фудбалски клуб Јагодина) was a Serbian professional football club based in the city of Jagodina. The club was founded in 1919 under the name JSK Zora, just months after the end of World War I. After numerous name changes and a merger of several clubs, the present name was created in 1962.

In the times of Yugoslavia and Serbia and Montenegro, FK Jagodina played mostly in the lower-tier leagues of the country, except 1957–58, than under the name FK Morava, and 1993–94, when they spent one season in the second division. In 2007, the club won the Serbian League East, one of four sections of the Serbian League, the third national tier, and managed the following season to win the first league ( second tier ) for the first time in its history, earning promotion to the SuperLiga.

They would spend time in the SuperLiga, FK Jagodina developed itself into a stable Serbian football club (during this time). Jagodina won its first Serbian Cup in 2013 and subsequently reached the 2014 Serbian Cup final, and finished at an all-time-high third place in the 2014 SuperLiga season. European games would follow against the likes of CFR Cluj from Romania and Rubin Kazan from Russia a moment for the club and its supporters. The club was dissolved in the summer of 2018 fue to financial problems.

Jagodina hosts its matches at the Jagodina City Stadium, which is part of the sports and leisure complex Đurđevo brdo, located in the very south of the city.

== History ==
=== Beginnings of FK Jagodina (1906–1939) ===
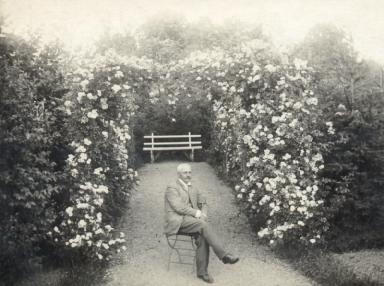
Sreten Adžić, the initiator of football in Jagodina, by bringing the first ball to the city.

It was 1906, when Sreten Adžić, today one of the most famous educators of Serbia and former student of the Universities of Vienna and Leipzig, brought the first football from Vienna to Jagodina. As the founder and director of the first male teachers school in the city, he saw in football the educational value of the physical, social and emotional development, as well as the opportunity for development of the youthful mind, with the goal of ethical virtues to maintain.

Over the years, football received more attention from the population and became very popular in the region, so that few months after the end of World War I, more precisely in 1919, the first football club was founded, after initiative of Milan Trifunović and several former Serbian soldiers, and the new club was named JSK Zora.

The first match was organized by Josip Baner, the brother of Franc Baner, who brought the second ball to Jagodina. He had the idea when he returned home from Skopje, and the club played against a combined team of SK Jugoslavija and BSK Belgrade, which they won the match surprising by 6–0 in front of 200 spectators.

In 1921, JSK Zora was disbanded and a new club, named SK Sparta, was formed, but in the same year the club was banned and changed its name in JSK Budućnost, which played in the league system of the Kingdom of Yugoslavia. In 1923, the club won the League of the Šumadija region, which corresponded to the third national tier. In the meantime, several teams were formed, but were later dissolved and their players formed in 1935 the football club JSK.

=== During the World War II (1939–1947) ===
During the World War II, the JSK was one of the strongest clubs in the country, but the Kingdom of Yugoslavia was attacked and occupied by the Axis powers. The region around Jagodina was under Nazi German military occupation by the Wehrmacht, but despite all difficulties, the JSK accomplishes major results in the national competition, in which could not every club participate for different reasons.

So in 1943, where JSK played 45 matches of which were won 32, and achieved the top position of the regional league of Morava Banovina. In the qualifications for the Serbian League, the club defeat Šumadija Kragujevac, however, the following season was postponed and never played. Its last match in this period was played on 25 May 1944, when they won SK Karađorđe from neighboring city Paraćin by 1–0.

On 9 May 1945, the day of the German Instrument of Surrender, which marked the end of the World War II, a new sports club, named SD Polet, was founded and competed in the league of Morava county. In 1946, the club was renamed to FK Nikčević, after Radislav Nikčević, a Serbian resistance fighter from Jagodina who was captured during the war by German soldiers and killed during a liberation struggle. Posthumously he received the title of People's Hero of Yugoslavia and 1951 from President Josip Broz Tito the Order of the People's Hero.

=== Name changes and club-merger (1947–1962) ===
In 1947, the FK Nikčević reached the 1/16 finals of the Yugoslav Cup. In 1949, the club renamed again its name, this time to FK Sloga, and competed in the league of Kragujevac. Among the club management belonged then Mile Milovanović, Dušan Stojković and Ljubiša Milosavljević. In 1951, the club was renamed in FK Mladost. 1953 was Rale Ristić the club president and Ostoja Simić the head coach of the team, which met during the Yugoslav Cup the defending champion Partizan Belgrade. Already in 1954, the club received the name FK Morava, named after the Morava, the longest river in Serbia, and on its shores also Jagodina is located.

1957 reached the club for the first time the Yugoslav Second League, specifically the IV Zona, then the second league consisted of five minor leagues. The captain of this generation was Dimitrije Milosavljević. During this same period, other football clubs were formed in Jagodina, including the FK Mladi Radnik in 1948, which was renamed 1952 in FK Jedinstvo. In the same year Jedinstvo won under coach Budimir Milivojević the City Cup, called Liberation of Svetozarevo, than the city bore during the Socialist Yugoslavia the name Svetozarevo after Svetozar Marković. In the finals they defeated previously Morava 3–2.

In 1952, also the FK Svetozarevo was established and soon the club was renamed to OFK Kablovi, after the local cable factory. In 1958 the city received its own stadium, the Jagodina City Stadium, which was built in the very south of the city, near the hill Đurđevo brdo, which offered 20,000 spectators at the time and was used by several Jagodina football clubs.

Finally it came on 14 October 1962 to a decisive merger of the clubs Morava, Jedinstvo and OFK Kablovi into one single club, today's FK Jagodina, which brought the end of a long era of name changes. Despite the turbulent history until then, the numerous name changes and the club fusion, the roots of the FK Jagodina are in 1919, the founding year of the JSK Zora, the very first football club in the city. Thus, even the FK Jagodina called officially 1919 as its founding year and is the successor of all of these clubs and continues their tradition.

=== Triste years, rise and establishment (1962–2008) ===
FK Jagodina did not record significant results in the following decades, and the club was located mainly in the fourth, and occasionally in the third stage of the Yugoslav football competition. After the dissolution of the Socialist Yugoslavia in 1992, the Federal Republic of Yugoslavia was established, which consisted of Serbia and Montenegro. The club achieved its major success since 1957, when they reached the second league, in 1993, when they promoted to the Second League of FR Yugoslavia, but they immediately relegated in the same season.

After a few setbacks, the club reached its new low point between 2002 and 2006, when they competed in the fourth-tier of the national football system. However, 2006 marked a turning point for FK Jagodina, because they were vice champions of the 2005–06 Pomoravlje-Timok Zone League and subsequently won the championship title of 2006–07 Serbian League East, one of the four sections of the Serbian League, the third national tier, and thus played next season in the Serbian First League. There the club succeeded immediately the vice championship of the 2007–08 Serbian First League and the attacker Igor Pavlović as top scorer with 17 goals played a major role. So, the FK Jagodina achieved three successive promotions, and returned in 2008 to the top flight, the Serbian SuperLiga, in which the club could also establish and it remained until nowadays.

=== Cup victory and Europe League (2008–2015) ===

FK Jagodina's starting lineup in the 2013 Serbian Cup final. (Coach: Simo Krunić).

Under head coach Simo Krunić, the 2011–12 SuperLiga season marked FK Jagodina's best season ever, finishing the season in fourth place, and thus booking a place in the 2012–13 Europa League. The first half of the next 2012–13 season the club achieved third place, making 2012 the most successful year in club's history to date, but the following season to exceed even the 2012 breakout year. Jagodina won the 2012–13 Serbian Cup, and it was the first major trophy in the club's history, with the losing opponent being a strong Vojvodina team. At the Partizan Stadium, where the final was played, the Blues defeated the favorites from Novi Sad 1–0. Milan Đurić scored the decisive goal with a penalty and shot FK Jagodina, in its first final, to its first Cup victory and biggest club success in almost a hundred years of club history. The penalty decision came as defender Đorđe Jokić handballed after a shot by Miloš Stojanović. Later, in the city center, the cup victory celebrations took place, which was attended also by Dragan Marković, the current president of the city council and party leader of United Serbia.

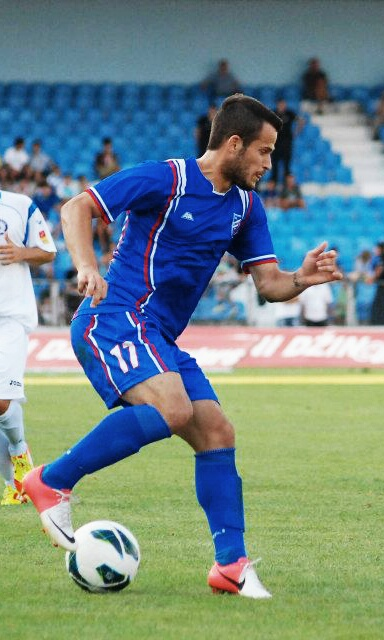
Dragan Stojkov while playing for FK Jagodina.

"Something has happened, which the city of Jagodina has never experienced in its history, namely that the FK Jagodina won the Serbian Cup. Why do we have so much invested in the sport: We want that the role models of the young people are on the sports fields. And all this city carries, what relates to sports, I consider is not a bad investment. […] In this way, we will continue to dissuade young people from the bad way, as well as drugs and alcohol and provide them with conditions that allow them to participate in the sport."

— Dragan Marković, Current president of the city council and former mayor of Jagodina and supporters of the club, 10 May 2013

The winning team and the coach, Krunić, were driven on a Double-decker bus from the Jagodina City Stadium to the city center and were greeted by thousands of people who celebrated their team and the club's historic success. The celebrations were accompanied by Serbian Brass Music, music typical for this region. The season finished with FK Jagodina again in the fourth place, again reaching the 2013–14 Europa League. Miloš Stojanović, who scored 19 goals, was also the top scorer in the league. In the following Europa League season Jagodina lost to Rubin Kazan 2–3 and 0–1. The 2013–14 season finished under the direction of a new coach, Mladen Dodić, in third place, so far the highest placing in club's history, and booking another spot in the 2014–15 Europa League. The club again reached the Serbian Cup final against the same team as the year before, but this time Vojvodina won 2–0. At the end of the season, Jagodina's striker Aleksandar Pešić was the second highest scorer of the league.

== Stadium ==
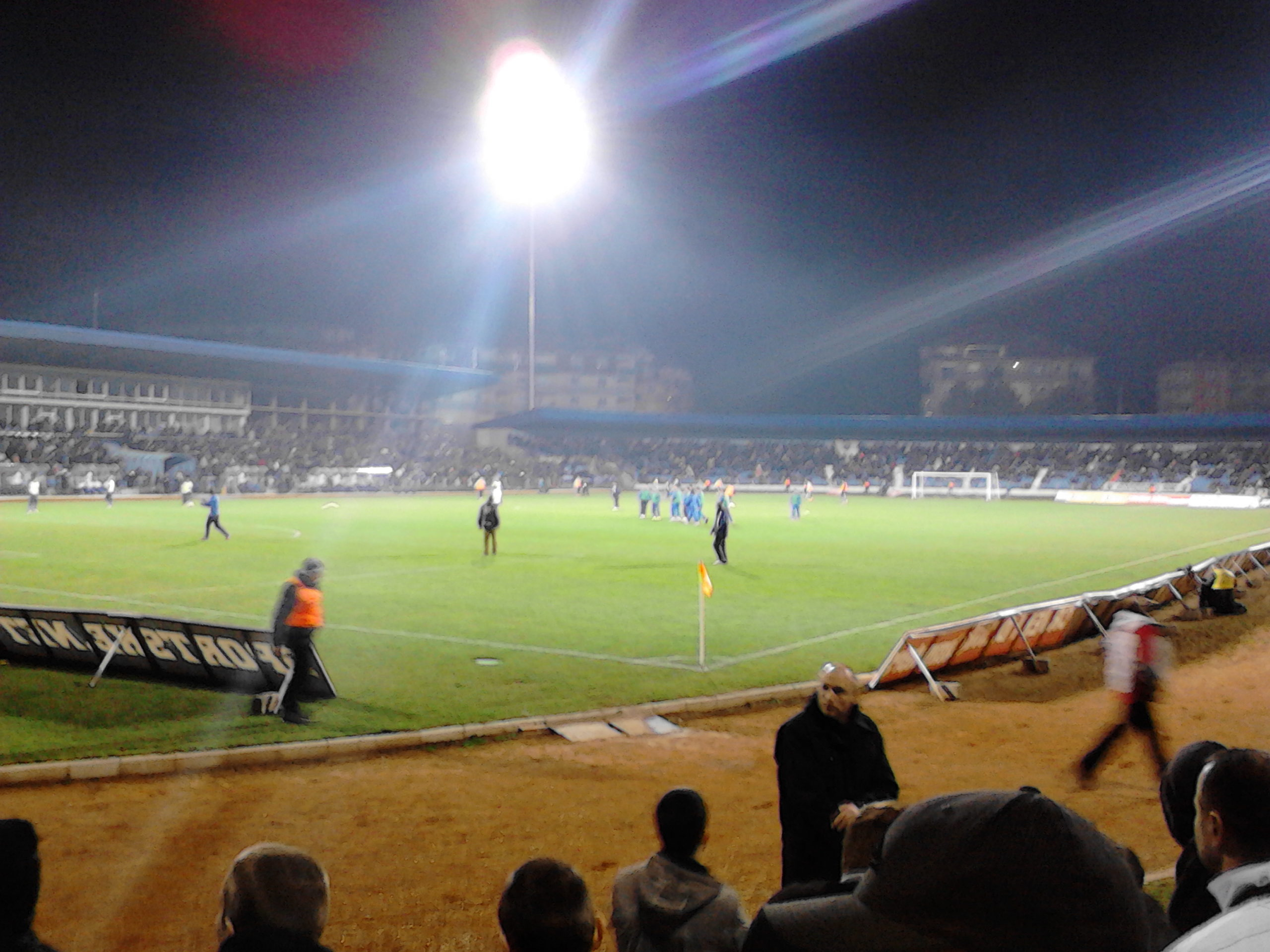
The Jagodina City Stadium during a championship match against Partizan Belgrade in 2013.

The home ground of the club is the Jagodina City Stadium, also known as Stadion pod Đurđevim Brdom (Stadium under the Đurđev-Hill ), has a seating capacity for 15,000 spectators and is part of the sports and leisure complex Đurđevo brdo, located in the very south of Jagodina. In the immediate vicinity of the stadium are another football pitch, a modern water park and the Zoo Park Jagodina, a tennis court complex and a sports hall, a kart racing track, a hotel as well as a nature park.

It dates from 1958 and then had a capacity of up to 20,000 spectators, but has been completely renovated from 2007 to 2008, which significantly reduced the capacity. So, new seats were installed, except the south stand, and a roof was constructed in the west stand along with VIP rooms, while the roof of the north stand was completed 2009. In the north stand is also a smaller hotel.

In 2009, the field was renovated and a new sports turf laid. This process costs more than 200,000 Euro. In 2012, a small restaurant was opened in the stadium named Blue Café. The stadium has also a professional gym. In the same year, FK Jagodina installed floodlights with strength of 1,500 lux. Its installation cost was about 400,000 Euro. In 2013, the southern stand was also equipped with seats, so the stadium is owned by four seat grandstands.

At the stadium are planned more renovations or projects, such as the construction of living rooms under the north stand, which are intended for the club players, as well as the completion of the west stand. Other future projects include a new blue tartan track, the main color of the club, as well as further reconstruction on the east and south stand, including its roofing.

== Supporters ==
The club has a smaller organized supporters group which are known as Brigada (The Brigade).

== Kit manufacturers and suppliers ==
The logo of Legea.

FK Jagodinas's shirts have been made in the last years by manufacturers including Nike (from 2008 until 2012) and the Serbian sportswear manufacturer NAAI (from 2012 until 2014). In May 2014, the club management announced that the following three seasons the Italien company Legea will be the kit supplier of FK Jagodina.

Period	Kit Manufacturer
2008–12	Nike
2012–14	NAAI
2014–17	Legea

== Club honours ==
=== Championship successes ===
The club was founded in 1919 under the name JSK Zora. After numerous name changes and a merger of several clubs, the present name was created in 1962. The FK Jagodina is the successor of all of these clubs and continues their tradition.

As FK Jagodina:

- Serbian SuperLiga
  - Third place (1): 2014
- Serbian League East
  - Winners (1): 2007

As FK Morava:

- Yugoslav Second League
  - Promoted to the Yugoslav Second League (1): 1957

As JSK:

- Promoted to the Serbian League of the Kingdom of Yugoslavia (1): 1943
- Championship of the Morava Banovina (1): 1943

As SK Sparta:

- Championship of the Šumadija region (1): 1923

=== Cup successes ===
As FK Jagodina the club celebrated its biggest sporting success with the winning of its first Serbian Cup in 2013 and the reaching of the Cup final 2014.

As FK Jagodina:

- Serbian Cup
  - Winners (1): 2013
  - Runners-up (1): 2014

As FK Nikčević:

- Yugoslav Cup
  - 1/16 finals (1): 1947

=== Other successes ===
As FK Jagodina:

- Fairest team of the Serbian SuperLiga (1): 2014

=== Individual awards ===
The FK Jagodina has been able to presented in its history two top scorers of the respective league. Igor Pavlović was with 17 goals in the 2007–08 Serbian First League the top scorer of the second division, and Miloš Stojanović was it with 19 goals in the 2012–13 Serbian SuperLiga, the top tier in Serbian football. Besides this, in the 2013–14 Serbian SuperLiga, Aleksandar Pešić was the second best scorer of the league.

FK Jagodina's youth players Predrag Rajković and Aleksandar Filipović belonged to the squad of the Serbia national under-19 team during the 2013 European Under-19 Championship in Lithuania, which won the title against France.

Serbian SuperLiga top scorers

Season	Name	Goals
2012–13	(Serbia) Miloš Stojanović	19

Serbian First League top scorer

Season	Name	Goals
2008	(Serbia) Igor Pavlović	17

== Jagodina in UEFA competition ==
- Qualified for European Cup for three seasons

Season	Competition	Round	Club	Home	Away	Aggregate
2012–13	UEFA Europa League	1Q	(Kazakhstan) Ordabasy	0–1	0–0	0–1
2013–14	UEFA Europa League	2Q	(Russia) Rubin Kazan	2–3	0–1	2–4
2014–15	UEFA Europa League	2Q	(Romania) CFR Cluj	0–1	0–0	0–1

== Players ==
=== Current squad ===
As of 1 January 2021

Note: Flags indicate national team as defined under FIFA eligibility rules; some limited exceptions apply. Players may hold more than one non-FIFA nationality.

No.	Pos.	Nation	Player
1	GK	SRB	Danijel Pavlović
2	DF	SRB	Danilo Sujić
3	DF	SRB	Branimir Spasojević
4	DF	SRB	Slobodan Stojković
5	DF	SRB	Strahinja Jovančić
6	DF	SRB	Stevan Radulović
7	MF	SRB	Petar Ristić
8	MF	SRB	Vladimir Ilić
9	MF	SRB	Milo Mićunović
10	MF	SRB	Predrag Medić
11	DF	SRB	Nikola Divac
12	GK	SRB	Bojan Tanasijević
13	FW	NGR	Cyril Nebo
14	FW	SRB	Andreja Stamenković

No.	Pos.	Nation	Player
15	DF	MNE	Vasilije Radenović
16	MF	NGR	Kingsley Nnaji
17	FW	SRB	Vladan Pavlović
18	MF	FRA	Nikola Stojanović
19	FW	SUI	Milan Basrak
20	MF	SRB	Miloš Plavšić
21	FW	SRB	Ilija Stojanović
22	MF	SRB	Nikola Obradović
23	MF	SRB	Andrija Milić
24	MF	SRB	Milan Nikolić
25	MF	SRB	Marko Ivečić
44	GK	SRB	Miloš Vesić
45	FW	SRB	Vladimir Petrović
50	GK	SRB	Bogdan Jovanović

=== Notable players ===
To appear in this section a player must have either:

- Played at least 80 games for the club.
- Set a club record or won an individual award while at the club.
- Played at least one international games for their national team at any time.
- (Socialist Federal Republic of Yugoslavia) Jovica Nikolić (early 1980s)
- (Socialist Federal Republic of Yugoslavia) Zvonko Milojević (during the 1980s)
- (Serbia) Igor Pavlović (2004), (2007–08)
- (Ghana) Alfred Arthur (2008–09)
- (Ghana) Kennedy Boateng (2008–10)
- (Serbia) Milan Perić (2009)
- (Serbia) Saša Cilinšek (2009–10)
- (Serbia) Perica Ognjenović (2009–11)
- (Montenegro) Marko Simić (2010–11)
- (Serbia) Budimir Janošević (2010–11)
- (Croatia) Marko Šimić (2010–12)
- (North Macedonia) Dragan Stojkov (2010–13)
- (Serbia) Ognjen Mudrinski (2011–12)
- (Serbia) Miloš Stojanović (2011–13)
- (Libya) Mohamed El Monir (2011–14)
- (Serbia) Predrag Rajković (2012–13)
- (Bosnia and Herzegovina) Dario Damjanović (2012–14)
- (Ghana) Francis Bossman (2013)
- (North Macedonia) Predrag Ranđelović (2013)
- (Serbia) Aleksandar Pešić (2013–14)
- (United States) Freddy Adu (2014)
- (Serbia) Ivan Cvetković (2012–14)

For the list of all current and former players with Wikipedia article, please see: Category:FK Jagodina players.

== Historical list of coaches ==
- (Socialist Federal Republic of Yugoslavia) Svetozar Andrejić (1972–87)
- (Serbia) Milojko Gošić (30 June 2007 – 26 Dec 2008)
- (Serbia) Nenad Milovanović (24 Dec 2008 – 2 May 2009)
- (Serbia) Milojko Gošić (caretaker) (2009)
- (Serbia) Nebojša Maksimović (2009)
- (Serbia) Mladen Dodić (1 July 2009 – 25 Oct 2010)
- (Serbia) Milojko Gošić (28 Oct 2010 – 11 April 2011)
- (Serbia) Jovica Škoro (11 April 2011 – 30 June 2011)
- (Bosnia and Herzegovina) Simo Krunić (1 July 2011 – 2 June 2013)
- (Serbia) Mladen Dodić (7 June 2013 – Sept 2014)
- (Bosnia and Herzegovina) Simo Krunić (Sept 2014 – 2015)
- (Serbia) Milojko Gošić (2015-2016)
- (Montenegro) Stevan Mojsilović (2016)
- (Serbia) Igor Bondžulić (2016)
- (Serbia) Aleksandar Janjić (2016)
- (Serbia) Zoltan Sabo (2016)
- (Serbia) Dragan Đurđević (2016)
- (Serbia) Slavenko Kuzeljević (2016)
- (Serbia) Dejan Kaplanović (2016)
- (Serbia) Vladan Petrović (2017-2018)
- (Serbia) Bojan Obradović (2018)
- (Serbia) Nebojša Kostić (2018)
- (Serbia) Vladan Petrović (2018)
- (Serbia) Ljubiša Stamenković (2019-2020)
- (Serbia) Darko Milisavljević (5 Aug 2020-29 Sep 20)
- (Serbia) Vladan Petrović (12 Nov 2020-17 Mar 21)
- (Serbia) Dragan Đurđević (17 Mar 2021-30 Jun 21)
- (Serbia) Ivan Petrović (2021-2022)
- (Serbia) Boban Ivanović (2022)
- (Serbia) Dušan Đokić (13 Jul 2022-31 Dec 22)
- (Serbia) Marko Vidojević (1 Jan 2023-31 May 23)
- (Serbia) Ivan Tasić (5 Jul 2023-7 Nov 23)
- (Serbia) Milojko Gošić (19 Jan 2024-2 Jun 24)
- (Serbia) Dejan Grujić (5 Jul 2024-Aug24)
- (Serbia) Zoran Terzić (30 Aug 2024-)
