= 2012–13 Serbian SuperLiga =

7th season of the Serbian SuperLiga

Jelen SuperLiga
- Season: 2012–13
- Champions: Partizan; 6th SuperLiga Title; 25th domestic title
- Relegated: BSK Borča; Smederevo
- Champions League: Partizan
- Europa League: Red Star; Jagodina; Vojvodina
- Matches: 240
- Goals: 570 (2.38 per match)
- Top goalscorer: Miloš Stojanović (19 goals)
- Biggest home win: Partizan 7–0 BSK
- Biggest away win: Smederevo 0–5 Javor
- Highest scoring: Red Star 7–2 BSK
- Longest winning run: Partizan 10
- Highest attendance: Red Star–Partizan 44,155

The 2012–13 Serbian SuperLiga (known as the Jelen SuperLiga for sponsorship reasons) was the seventh season of the Serbian SuperLiga, the top football league of Serbia. The season began on 26 August 2012 and ended on 25 May 2013.

A total of 16 teams contested the league, including 14 sides from the 2011–12 season and two promoted from the 2011–12 Serbian First League. Partizan successfully defended their title. Last two teams, BSK Borča and Smederevo were relegated, while 14th team played play-off with 3rd placed team from 2012–13 Serbian First League.

== Teams ==
Metalac and Borac Čačak were relegated to the 2012–13 Serbian First League after the last season for finishing in 16th and 15th place, respectively. Metalac completed a three-year tenure in the league, while Borac were relegated after competing in top-tier football for nine seasons.

The relegated teams were replaced by 2011–12 First League champions Radnički Niš and runners-up Donji Srem. Radnički returned to the top tier for the first time since the season 2002–03, while this was the first season in top-tier competition for Donji Srem.

=== Stadiums and locations ===
Location of teams in 2012–13 Serbian SuperLiga

All figures for stadiums include seating capacity only, as many stadiums in Serbia have stands without seats which would otherwise depict the actual number of people able to attend football matches not regulated by UEFA or FIFA.

Team	City	Stadium	Capacity
BSK	Belgrade	Špinjata	2,500
Donji Srem	Pećinci	Karađorđe Stadium	12,303
Hajduk	Kula	Stadion Hajduk	5,973
Jagodina	Jagodina	Jagodina City Stadium	15,000
Javor	Ivanjica	Javor Stadium	5,000
Novi Pazar	Novi Pazar	Novi Pazar City Stadium	12,000
OFK	Belgrade	Omladinski Stadium	19,100
Partizan	Belgrade	Partizan Stadium	32,710
Rad	Belgrade	Stadion Kralj Petar I	6,000
Radnički 1923	Kragujevac	Čika Dača Stadium	15,100
Radnički	Niš	Čair Stadium	18,151
Red Star	Belgrade	Red Star Stadium	55,538
Sloboda	Užice	Užice City Stadium	12,000
Smederevo	Smederevo	Smederevo City Stadium	17,200
Spartak Zlatibor Voda	Subotica	Subotica City Stadium	13,000
Vojvodina	Novi Sad	Karađorđe Stadium	12,303

=== Personnel and kits ===
Note: Flags indicate national team as has been defined under FIFA eligibility rules. Players and Managers may hold more than one non-FIFA nationality.

Team	Head coach	Captain	Kit manufacturer	Shirt sponsor
BSK Borča	(Serbia) Miodrag Radanović	(Serbia) Aleksandar Radunović	hummel	ĐAK
Donji Srem	(Serbia) Bogić Bogićević	(Serbia) Miloš Josimov	Joma	Industrija Đurđević Pećinci
Hajduk Kula	(Serbia) Milan Milanović	(Serbia) Lazar Veselinović	Joma	—
Jagodina	(Bosnia and Herzegovina) Simo Krunić	(Serbia) Miloš Stojanović	NAAI	—
Javor Ivanjica	(Serbia) Mladen Dodić	(Serbia) Milovan Milović	Jako	Alcea / Matis
Novi Pazar	(Serbia) Nebojša Vučićević	(Serbia) Emir Lotinac	Joma	Conto Bene
OFK Beograd	(Serbia) Zoran Milinković	(Montenegro) Nemanja Nikolić	Onze11 S.R.L	FOX
Partizan	(Serbia) Vuk Rašović	(Serbia) Saša Ilić	adidas	Lav pivo
Rad	(Serbia) Marko Nikolić	(Serbia) Uroš Vitas	Joma	—
Radnički 1923	(Serbia) Dragoljub Bekvalac	(Serbia) Željko Milošević	Joma	—
Radnički Niš	(Serbia) Saša Mrkić	(Serbia) Predrag Stamenković	Legea	—
Red Star	(Portugal) Ricardo Sá Pinto	(Serbia) Nenad Milijaš	Legea	Gazprom
Sloboda	(Serbia) Ljubiša Stamenković	(Serbia) Aleksandar Pejović	Jako	Point Group / Farmakom MB
Smederevo	(Serbia) Ljubomir Ristovski	(Serbia) Dejan Živković	NAAI	Municipality of Smederevo
Spartak	(Serbia) Petar Kurćubić	(Serbia) Vladimir Torbica	Erreà	Zlatibor Voda
Vojvodina	(Serbia) Nebojša Vignjević	(Serbia) Miroslav Vulićević	Joma	Volkswagen

Nike is the official ball supplier for Serbian SuperLiga.

== Transfers ==
For the list of transfers involving SuperLiga clubs during 2012–13 season, please see: List of Serbian football transfers winter 2012–13 and List of Serbian football transfers summer 2012.

== League table ==
Pos	Team	Pld	W	D	L	GF	GA	GD	Pts	Qualification or relegation
1	Partizan (C)	30	23	4	3	71	16	+55	73	Qualification for Champions League second qualifying round
2	Red Star Belgrade	30	20	2	8	55	35	+20	62	Qualification for Europa League second qualifying round
3	Vojvodina	30	17	10	3	40	20	+20	61	Qualification for Europa League first qualifying round
4	Jagodina	30	15	5	10	35	26	+9	50	Qualification for Europa League second qualifying round
5	Sloboda Užice	30	11	12	7	39	37	+2	45	
6	OFK Beograd	30	13	6	11	34	32	+2	45	
7	Rad	30	12	8	10	32	30	+2	44	
8	Hajduk Kula	30	10	8	12	36	32	+4	38	
9	Spartak Zlatibor Voda	30	9	9	12	36	39	−3	36	
10	Javor Ivanjica	30	9	7	14	38	40	−2	34	
11	Donji Srem	30	9	7	14	26	34	−8	34	
12	Radnički Niš	30	9	7	14	30	44	−14	34	
13	Radnički 1923	30	7	10	13	25	35	−10	31	
14	Novi Pazar	30	7	9	14	29	40	−11	30 (Note: Head-to-head record: Novi Pazar–BSK Borča 1–1, BSK Borča–Novi Pazar 2–3.)	
15	BSK Borča (R)	30	8	6	16	26	57	−31	30	Relegation to Serbian First League
16	Smederevo (R)	30	3	6	21	18	53	−35	15	Relegation to Serbian First League

Source: Serbian SuperLiga
Rules for classification: 1) points; 2) head-to-head points; 3) head-to-head goal difference; 4) head-to-head goals scored; 5) goal difference; 6) number of goals scored.
(C) Champions; (R) Relegated

== Results ==
Home \ Away	BSK	DSR	HAJ	JAG	JAV	NPZ	OFK	PAR	RAD	RDK	RNI	RSB	SUŽ	SME	SZV	VOJ
BSK Borča		2–1	0–3	1–2	1–0	2–3	0–2	0–4	1–0	2–0	2–1	0–1	1–0	1–1	0–3	3–3
Donji Srem	0–1		1–0	0–2	3–0	3–0	0–0	2–1	1–2	2–0	1–1	1–2	0–0	2–1	0–0	0–1
Hajduk Kula	1–1	3–2		3–0	2–0	2–0	3–0	1–1	2–0	0–0	1–2	0–1	3–3	2–1	0–1	0–0
Jagodina	2–0	2–0	1–0		1–0	2–1	1–0	0–1	3–0	2–1	1–0	2–3	2–0	0–1	1–1	0–1
Javor Ivanjica	1–2	0–1	2–1	0–1		3–2	3–1	0–1	1–0	1–1	2–0	1–2	1–1	4–0	2–0	0–4
Novi Pazar	1–1	2–0	0–2	2–1	2–2		0–0	0–0	4–0	1–0	3–0	1–2	2–2	2–1	1–1	0–1
OFK Beograd	1–1	0–1	0–0	1–3	1–1	1–0		1–3	1–0	1–0	5–1	1–0	1–0	4–3	1–0	0–0
Partizan	7–0	2–0	5–2	1–0	2–1	3–1	2–0		2–0	2–0	3–1	1–0	5–0	4–0	5–0	1–2
Rad	3–0	2–0	1–0	1–0	2–2	2–0	1–0	0–1		2–0	3–1	1–1	2–0	0–0	1–0	1–1
Radnički 1923	0–0	2–0	3–2	0–0	1–2	1–1	3–2	0–1	1–1		0–1	0–3	0–2	2–0	1–1	2–0
Radnički Niš	4–1	1–1	1–0	0–0	2–0	0–0	1–2	0–4	1–1	1–1		2–1	0–1	1–0	2–0	0–1
Red Star Belgrade	7–2	1–0	3–0	1–2	2–1	3–0	1–0	3–2	2–2	2–0	3–2		1–2	3–1	4–1	0–3
Sloboda Užice	1–0	2–2	2–1	1–1	2–2	2–0	4–3	0–0	1–0	0–2	0–0	1–2		4–1	2–0	1–1
Smederevo	2–0	0–1	0–1	2–1	0–5	0–0	0–2	0–2	1–1	2–2	0–1	0–1	0–1		0–2	1–2
Spartak Zlatibor Voda	2–1	1–1	0–0	3–1	1–1	2–0	0–2	2–2	2–3	1–2	4–1	3–0	2–2	2–0		0–1
Vojvodina	1–0	3–0	1–1	1–1	1–0	1–0	0–1	0–3	1–0	0–0	3–2	3–0	2–2	0–0	2–1	

Source: Serbian SuperLiga
Legend: Blue = home team win; Yellow = draw; Red = away team win.

== Statistics ==
=== Top scorers ===
Sources: Superliga official website, soccerway.com

Pos	Scorer	Team	Goals
1	(Serbia) Miloš Stojanović	Jagodina	19
2	(Serbia) Predrag Ranđelović	Sloboda	18
3	(Serbia) Lazar Veselinović	Hajduk	17
4	(Serbia) Đorđe Despotović	Spartak	12
5	(Serbia) Ognjen Mudrinski	Red Star	11
5	(Serbia) Nemanja Kojić	Partizan / Rad	11
5	(Cameroon) Aboubakar Oumarou	Vojvodina	11

=== Hat-tricks ===
Player	For	Against	Result	Date
(Serbia) Vladimir Radivojević	Javor	Smederevo	5–0	18 August 2012
(Serbia) Ognjen Mudrinski	Red Star	Radnički Niš	3–2	2 September 2012
(Brazil) Eliomar	Javor	OFK Beograd	3–1	29 September 2012
(Serbia) Aleksandar Nosković	Spartak	Jagodina	3–1	17 November 2012
(Serbia) Lazar Veselinović	Hajduk	Jagodina	3–0	27 February 2013
(Serbia) Miloš Stojanović	Jagodina	Rad	3–0	6 April 2013
(Serbia) Nenad Milijaš	Red Star	Spartak	4–1	13 April 2013

=== Team of the Season ===

Serbian SuperLiga Team of the Year

SuperLiga Team of the Year
Position	Player	Team
GK	(Serbia) Vladimir Stojković	Partizan
DR	(Serbia) Miroslav Vulićević	Vojvodina
DC	(Bulgaria) Ivan Ivanov	Partizan
DC	(Serbia) Branislav Trajković	Vojvodina
DL	(Serbia) Miloš Josimov	Donji Srem
MR	(Cameroon) Aboubakar Oumarou	Vojvodina
MC	(Serbia) Luka Milivojević	Red Star
MC	(Serbia) Sasa Ilić	Partizan
ML	(Serbia) Lazar Marković	Partizan
FW	(Serbia) Lazar Veselinović	Hajduk Kula
FW	(Serbia) Aleksandar Mitrović	Partizan

=== Fair play award ===
Team
Donji Srem

== Attendance ==
The 2012–13 season saw an average attendance by club:

	Club	Average	Highest	Lowest	Attendance (%)
1	Red Star	16,221	45,155	4,930	31.19%
2	Partizan	7,622	30,000	20*	23.24%
3	Radnički Niš	4,613	13,000	1,500	30.75%
4	Novi Pazar	4,300	6,500	20*	28.93%
5	Vojvodina	3,747	7,000	700	23.8%
6	Sloboda	3,207	10,000	1,200	26.73%
7	Radnički 1923	3,168	11,000	20*	20.98%
8	Jagodina	2,907	12,000	800	29.07%
9	Smederevo	1,733	7,000	300	10.38%
10	Spartak	1,547	7,000	400	11.9%
11	Hajduk	1,448	3,000	20*	13.16%
12	Donji Srem	1,113	5,000	200	7.07%
13	Rad	980	2,600	500	30.63%
14	Javor	900	3,500	400	25%
15	BSK Borča	853	3,000	300	21.33%
16	OFK Beograd	757	4,000	150	5.41%

* due to previous crowd troubles, audience was not allowed on some games

== Champion squad ==
FK Partizan
Goalkeepers: Vladimir Stojković (21/1); Nikola Petrović (10); Živko Živković (1).

Defenders: (Bulgaria) Ivan Ivanov (29/4); Aleksandar Miljković (24); (North Macedonia) Aleksandar Lazevski (17); Miloš Ostojić (13/1); (Montenegro) Vladimir Volkov (12/1); Tomislav Pajović (12); Vojislav Stanković (7); Branko Pauljević (5); Marko Živković (2); (North Macedonia) Stefan Aškovski (1).

Midfielders: Saša Ilić (25/5); Milan Smiljanić (24/1); Nikola Ninković (21/4); Miloš Jojić (20/4); Saša Marković (17/2); Predrag Luka (14/3); Darko Brašanac (11/1); (Brazil) Eliomar (7); Goran Lovre (4); Dejan Babić (2); Filip Knežević (1); Andrija Živković (1); Danilo Pantić (1).

Forwards: Aleksandar Mitrović (25/10); Lazar Marković (19/7); Marko Šćepović (17/6); Nemanja Kojić (13/6).

(league appearances and goals listed in brackets)

Managers: Vladimir Vermezović; Vuk Rašović.

On the roster but haven't played in a league game: (Montenegro) Žarko Tomašević

Transferred out during the season: Stefan Šćepović (14/8, to Ashdod); Nemanja Tomić (13/3, to Gençlerbirliği); (Sierra Leone) Medo (8, to Bolton Wanderers); (Libya) Mohamed Zubya (4/1, released); Nikola Aksentijević (3, to SBV Vitesse); Sreten Sretenović (1, to Gyeongnam); Zvonimir Vukić (to PAOK); Radiša Ilić (retired).
