= FK Jedinstvo Paraćin =

Serbian football club

Jedinstvo Paraćin
- Full name: FK Jedinstvo Paraćin
- Nickname: Zeleno-beli (The Green-Whites)
- Founded: 1925; 101 years ago
- Ground: Paraćin City Stadium
- Capacity: 8,000
- President: Aleksandar Jovanović
- Head coach: Darko Miladinović
- League: Serbian League East
- 2024–25: Serbian League East, 9th of 16
Home colours	Away colours

FK Jedinstvo Paraćin (Serbian Cyrillic: ФК Јединство Параћин) is a football club based in Paraćin, Serbia. They compete in the Serbian League East, the third tier of the national league system.

== History ==
The club qualified for the Yugoslav Cup in the 1984–85 season. They defeated Sloboda Tuzla on penalties in the opening round, before losing 5–0 away to Hajduk Split in the next phase.

The club won the Serbian League East in the 1994–95 season and took promotion to the Second League of FR Yugoslavia. They spent two seasons in the second tier of FR Yugoslavia football. Despite suffering relegation to the third tier in 1996–97, the club achieved one of its best results in history by reaching the FR Yugoslavia Cup semi-finals that season, losing 1–0 on aggregate to Vojvodina. They would spend four more consecutive seasons in the second tier between 1998 and 2002.

== Honours ==
Serbian League East / Serbian League Timok (Tier 3)

- 1994–95 / 1997–98

Pomoravlje Zone League / Zone League West (Tier 4)

- 2003–04 / 2015–16

== Seasons ==
Season	League									Cup
Season	Division	Pld	W	D	L	GF	GA	Pts	Pos	Cup
Serbia and Montenegro
1996–97	2 – East	34	12	9	13	35	39	45	14th	Semi-finals
1997–98	3 – Timok	34	25	8	1	84	26	83	1st	—
1998–99	2 – East	21 (Note: The season was cut short due to the NATO bombing of Yugoslavia.)	8	1	12	22	32	25	13th	—
1999–2000	2 – East	32	15	8	9	54	28	53	4th	—
2000–01	2 – East	34	16	7	11	56	39	55	5th	—
2001–02	2 – East	34	10	6	18	55	85	36	14th	—
2002–03	3 – Timok	34	14	9	11	85	59	51	9th	—
2003–04	4 – Pomoravlje	25	19	3	3	92	31	60	1st	—
2004–05	3 – East	34	14	5	15	49	49	47	9th	—
2005–06	3 – East	34	15	4	15	42	46	49	9th	—
Serbia
2006–07	3 – East	34	12	7	15	43	57	43	13th	—
2007–08	4 – Pomoravlje-Timok	34	21	8	5	89	30	71	2nd	—
2008–09	3 – East	28	9	5	14	28	46	32	11th	—
2009–10	3 – East	30	11	2	17	36	42	35	14th	—
2010–11	3 – East	30	8	7	15	37	51	31	15th	—
2011–12	4 – Pomoravlje-Timok	30	16	9	5	81	29	57	2nd	—
2012–13	4 – Pomoravlje-Timok	30	17	3	10	91	33	54	3rd	—
2013–14	3 – East	30	12	3	15	34	44	38 (Note: The club was docked one point.)	14th	—
2014–15	4 – West	28	22	2	4	85	20	68	2nd	—
2015–16	4 – West	30	25	2	3	81	18	77	1st	Preliminary round
2016–17	3 – East	30	12	7	11	47	27	43	6th	—
2017–18	3 – East	30	13	9	8	50	34	47	5th	—
2018–19	3 – East	34	11	3	20	36	72	36	15th	—
2019–20	4 – West	17 (Note: The season was cut short due to the COVID-19 pandemic in Serbia.)	14	2	1	46	6	44	2nd	—
2020–21	3 – East	38	19	7	12	73	38	64	7th	—
2021–22	3 – East	28	8	10	10	28	31	34	10th	—
2022–23	3 – East	30	13	5	12	42	35	44	8th	—
2023–24	3 – East	30	12	5	13	42	50	41	10th	—
2024–25	3 – East	30	12	4	14	36	33	40	9th	—

== Notable players ==
This is a list of players who have played at full international level.

- (Montenegro) Filip Kasalica
- (Serbia and Montenegro) Nenad Đorđević
- (Serbia and Montenegro) Ivan Dudić

For a list of all FK Jedinstvo Paraćin players with a Wikipedia article, see Category:FK Jedinstvo Paraćin players.

== Historical list of coaches ==
- (Socialist Federal Republic of Yugoslavia) Momčilo Tomić
- (Federal Republic of Yugoslavia) Boško Prodanović
- (Federal Republic of Yugoslavia) Slavenko Kuzeljević (1995-1996)
- (Federal Republic of Yugoslavia) Nikola Rakojević (1996-1997)
- (Federal Republic of Yugoslavia) Dragan Lacmanović
- (Serbia) Goran Marković
- (Serbia) Goran Dedijer
- (Serbia) Goran Nikić (2010-2011)
- (Serbia) Mikica Manojlović
- (Serbia) Goran Marković (2015–2016)
- (Serbia) Gabrijel Radojičić (2016–2017)
- (Serbia) Vladimir Pantelić (2017)
- (Serbia) Srećko Mišić (2018)
- (Serbia) Miodrag Stefanović (2018–2019)
- (Serbia) Vladan Petrović (2019)
- (Serbia) Darko Miladinović (2020)
- (Serbia) Vladimir Pantelić (2020–2021)
- (Serbia) Milan Đorđević (Sep 2021)
- (Serbia) Đorđe Zlatanović (Sep 2021–2023)
- (Serbia) Darko Miladinović (Sep 2023-)
