= Bojan =

- Gender: male

Origin
- Language: Slavic
- Origin: boj "battle"
- Derivation: boj- (root) + an (suffix)

Other names
- Nicknames: Boki, Bojči
- Related names: Boyan

Bojan (Serbian Cyrillic and Macedonian: Бојан; Ukrainian, Russian and Bulgarian Cyrillic: Боян, transcribed Boyan) is a Slavic given name, derived from the Slavic noun boj "battle." The ending -an is a suffix frequently found in anthroponyms of Slavic origin. The feminine variant is Bojana. The name is recorded in historical sources among Serbs, Bulgarians, Czechs, Poles, Croats, Slovenians, Macedonians, Ukrainians and Russians. In Slovenia, it is the 18th most popular name for males, as of 2010.

Notable people named Bojan may include:

- Bojan Accetto (1922–2007), Slovenian physician
- Bojan Adamič, Slovene composer of jazz, the Slovenian song festival music, and film scores
- Bojan Aleksandrović (born 1977), Timok Vlach Romanian Orthodox priest
- Bojan Aleksov, Serbian anti-war and human rights activist and historian
- Bojan Avramović (born 1997), Serbian football player
- Bojan Bakić (born 1983), Montenegrin professional basketball player
- Bojan Banjac (born 1971), Serbian association footballer
- Bojan Bazelli, ASC (born 1957), Montenegrin cinematographer and director
- Bojan Beljanski (born 1986), Serbian handball player
- Bojan Beljić (born 1985), Serbian professional footballer
- Bojan Bogdanović (born 1989), Croatian basketball player
- Bojan Bojanovski, director of the Administration for Security and Counterintelligence of Macedonia
- Bojan Božović (born 1985), Montenegrin professional footballer
- Bojan Brać (born 1989), Serbian professional footballer
- Bojan Brnović (born 1979), Montenegrin professional footballer
- Bojan Čečarić (born 1993), Serbian professional footballer
- Bojan Čiča (born 1996), Serbian football defender
- Bojan Ciger (born 1994), Serbian professional footballer
- Bojan Čop (1923–1994), Slovene linguist
- Bojan Čukić (born 1988), Serbian professional footballer
- Bojan Cvjetićanin (born 1999), Slovenian singer and vocalist of the band Joker Out
- Bojan Đerić (born 1982), Serbian professional basketball coach
- Bojan Dimitrijević (actor) (born 1973), Serbian actor
- Bojan Dimitrijević (politician) (born 1963), Serbian economist and politician
- Bojan Dimitrov or Boyan Dimitrov (born 1916, date of death unknown), Bulgarian alpine skier
- Bojan Dimoski (born 2001), Macedonian professional footballer
- Bojan Djordjic (born 1982), Swedish footballer of Serbian descent
- Bojan Dojkić (born 1984), Serbian footballer
- Bojan Đorđev (born 1977), Serbian theatre director and theorist
- Bojan Dubajić (born 1990), Serbian professional footballer
- Bojan Dubljević (born 1991), Montenegrin basketball player
- Bojan Đurković (born 1989), Croatian sports shooter
- Bojan Enravota, 9th century Bulgarian Christian martyr and saint
- Bojan Filipović (born 1976), Serbian professional footballer
- Bojan Gjorgievski (born 1992), Macedonian footballer
- Bojan Globočnik (1962–2021), Slovenian ski jumper
- Bojan Gočanin (born 1997), Serbian footballer
- Bojan Gojak (born 1979), Serbian football defender
- Bojan Golubović (born 1983), Bosnian professional footballer
- Bojan Gorišek (born 1962), Slovenian pianist
- Bojan Grego (born 1970), Croatian sailor
- Bojan Hadzihalilovic (born 1964), Sarajevo-based graphic designer
- Bojan Hodak (born 1971), Croatian professional football coach and former player
- Bojan Isailović (born 1980), Serbian professional footballer
- Bojan Jambrošić (born 1985), Croatian pop singer, winner of Hrvatska traži zvijezdu
- Bojan Jamina (1979–2022), Bosnian professional footballer
- Bojan Janić (born 1982), Serbian volleyball player
- Bojan Jokić (born 1986), Slovenian football player
- Bojan Jorgačević (born 1982), Serbian football player
- Bojan Jovanović (born 1980), Croatian fencer
- Bojan Jovanovski a.k.a. Boki 13 (born 1986), Macedonian TV personality
- Bojan Jović (born 1982), Serbian football goalkeeper
- Bojan Jovičić (born 1977), Serbian professional basketball coach and former player
- Bojan Kajgo or Boban Kajgo (born 1989), Canadian soccer player of Serbian origin
- Bojan Knežević (Croatian footballer) (born 1997), Croatian footballer
- Bojan Knežević (Serbian footballer) (born 1989), Serbian footballer
- Bojan Kocew (born 1930), Bulgarian cyclist
- Bojan Kosić (born 1990), Montenegrin alpine skier
- Bojan Kostreš (born 1974), Serbian politician
- Bojan Kovačević (born 2004), Serbian professional footballer
- Bojan Krasić (born 1983), Serbian football defender
- Bojan Kraut (1908–1991), Slovene mechanical engineer and textbook writer
- Bojan Križaj (born 1957), Slovenian alpine skier
- Bojan Krkić (born 1990), Spanish footballer
- Bojan Krstevski (born 1989), Macedonian professional basketball player
- Bojan Krstović (born 1980), Serbian professional basketball player
- Bojan Kumar (born 1950), Yugoslav ice hockey player
- Bojan Kumer (born 1974), Slovenian politician
- Bojan Kurajica (born 1947), Croatian-Bosnian chess grandmaster
- Bojan Kusmuk (born 1969), Serbian basketball coach and former player
- Bojan Lazić (born 1974), professional Serbian football player
- Bojan Letić (born 1992), Bosnian professional footballer
- Bojan Ljubevski (born 1996), Macedonian handball player
- Bojan Lugonja (born 1998), Austrian football player
- Bojan Madzovski (born 1994), Macedonian handball player
- Bojan Magazin (born 1976), Bosnian football manager and former player
- Bojan Malinić (born 1990), Serbian football striker
- Bojan Mališić (born 1984), Serbian professional footballer
- Bojan Mamić (born 1981), Serbian footballer
- Bojan Marjanović (born 1981), Serbian pianist and composer based in Norway
- Bojan Markoski (born 1983), Macedonian football defender
- Bojan Marković (born 1985), Bosnian professional footballer
- Bojan Marović (born 1984), Montenegrin singer
- Bojan Matić (born 1991), Serbian professional footballer
- Bojan Mihajlović (footballer, born 1973), Serbian footballer
- Bojan Mihajlović (footballer, born 1988), Bosnian-Herzegovinian footballer
- Bojan Mijailović (born 1995), Serbian professional footballer
- Bojan Mikulić (born 1980), Serbian and Bosnian and Herzegovinian academic sculptor
- Bojan Miladinović (born 1982), Serbian professional footballer, vice-president of Napredak Kruševac
- Bojan Miljuš (born 1994), Serbian football defender
- Bojan Milovanović (born 1960), Serbian politician and administrator
- Bojan Miovski (born 1999), Macedonian footballer
- Bojan Mišić (born 1978), Serbian football goalkeeper
- Bojan Mitic (born 1985), Paralympian Track and field athlete from Switzerland
- Bojan Mlađović (born 1995), Serbian professional footballer
- Bojan Mohar (born 1956), Slovenian and Canadian mathematician
- Bojan Najdenov (born 1991), Macedonian footballer
- Bojan Nastić (born 1994), Bosnian professional footballer
- Bojan Navojec (born 1976), Croatian theatre and film actor
- Bojan Neziri (born 1982), Serbian footballer
- Bojan Ostojić (born 1984), Serbian professional footballer
- Bojan Pajtić (born 1970), Serbian lawyer, former politician, professor at the University of Novi Sad
- Bojan Pandžić (born 1982), Swedish football referee
- Bojan Pavićević (born 1975), Serbian futsal player
- Bojan Pavlović (footballer, born 1985), Serbian football manager and former player
- Bojan Pavlović (footballer, born 1986), Serbian professional footballer
- Bojan Pečar (Serbian Cyrillic: Бојан Печар) (1960–1998), Yugoslav and Serbian musician
- Bojan Petrić (born 1984), Bosnian-Herzegovinian football player
- Bojan Počkar (1963–1996), Slovenian mountain climber
- Bojan Polak (1918–2004), Yugoslav military officer, communist politician and athlete
- Bojan Popović (born 1983), Serbian professional basketball player
- Bojan Postružnik (1952–1989), Slovenian archer
- Bojan Prašnikar (born 1953), Slovenian football manager and former player
- Bojan Prešern (born 1962), Slovenian rower who competed for Yugoslavia
- Bojan Puzigaća (born 1985), Bosnian professional footballer
- Bojan Radetić (born 1988), Serbian professional basketball player
- Bojan Radović (born 1992), Montenegrin volleyball player
- Bojan Radulović (basketball) (born 1992), Slovenian-Serbian professional basketball player
- Bojan Radulović (footballer) (born 1999), professional footballer
- Bojan Rajković (born 1991), Serbian volleyball player
- Bojan Rašić (born 1985), politician in Serbia
- Bojan Razpet (born 1960), Yugoslav ice hockey player
- Bojan Regoje (born 1981), Bosnian professional footballer
- Bojan Roganović (born 2000), Montenegrin footballer
- Bojan Ropret (born 1957), Slovene cyclist
- Bojan Samardžija (born 1985), Bosnia and Herzegovina cross-country skier
- Bojan Sanković (born 1993), Montenegrin professional footballer
- Bojan Šaranov (born 1987), Serbian footballer
- Bojan Šarčević (born 1974), Bosnian-French visual artist
- Bojan Savnik (born 1914, date of death unknown), Yugoslav canoeist
- Bojan Šejić (born 1983), Serbian football goalkeeper
- Bojan Simić (born 1976), Serbian footballer
- Bojan Šljivančanin (born 1982), Montenegrin footballer
- Bojan Šober (born 1957), bass-baritone opera singer and manager
- Bojan Spasojević (footballer, born 1980), Serbian footballer
- Bojan Spasojević (footballer, born 1992), Serbian footballer
- Bojan Krkić Sr. (born 1962), Serbian footballer
- Bojan Šrot (born 1960), Slovenian politician, judge, lawyer, and mountaineer
- Bojan Stamenković (born 1981), Serbian football midfielder
- Bojan Stepanović (born 1983), Serbian footballer
- Bojan Štih (1923–1986), Slovene literary critic, stage director, and essayist
- Bojan Stupica (1910–1970), Slovenian actress and theatrical director
- Bojan Subotić (born 1990), Serbian-Montenegrin professional basketball player
- Bojan Tadić (born 1981), Bosnian footballer
- Bojan Tadić (basketball) (born 1972), Serbian professional basketball player
- Bojan Tokić (born 1981), Slovenian table tennis player
- Bojan Tomašević (born 2001), Montenegrin professional basketball player
- Bojan Torbica (born 1974), Serbian politician, president of the Movement of Socialists
- Bojan Trajkovski (born 1986), Macedonian professional basketball player
- Bojan Trkulja (born 1982), Bosnian footballer
- Bojan Udovič (1957–2015), Slovene cyclist
- Bojan Ušumović (born 1988), Serbian football defender
- Bojan Veličković (born 1988), Serbian MMA fighter
- Bojan Vručina (born 1984), Croatian professional footballer
- Bojan Vučković (born 1980), Serbian chess Grandmaster
- Bojan Vučković (footballer) (born 1970), Serbian footballer
- Bojan Vujić (born 1974), Bosnian diplomat and former professional tennis player
- Bojan Vuletić (born 1971), composer, musician and producer
- Bojan Westin (1926–2013), Swedish actress
- Bojan Zajić (born 1980), Serbian professional footballer and coach
- Bojan Zavišić (born 1979), Serbian footballer
- Bojan Zdelar (born 2000), Serbian sprint canoeist
- Bojan Zdešar (born 1984), Slovenian freestyle swimmer
- Bojan Žirović (born 1971), Serbian actor
- Bojan Živanović (born 1989), Serbian football defender
- Bojan Živković (born 1981), Serbian football midfielder
- Bojan Zogović (born 1989), Montenegrin footballer
- Bojan Zoranović (born 1990), Serbian football forward
- Bojan Zulfikarpašić (born 1968), Serbian jazz pianist

== See also ==
- Bojan, Baluchistan or Bogan-e Bala, Iran, village in Baluchistan, Iran
- Bojan, the former German name for Boiany, Chernivtsi oblast, Ukraine, in the historic region of Bukovina
- Bojan the Bear (Slovene: Medved Bojan), Slovenian animation children's television series
- Boyan (given name)
- Dagny Carlsson (1912–2022), Swedish blogger and supercentenarian who used the pen name "Bojan"
