= Boyan =

Boyan may refer to:

== People ==
- Boyan (given name), a common Bulgarian given name
- Bojan, a common Slavic given name spelled as Boyan in Bulgarian
- Boyan the Mage (10th century), a Bulgarian prince and alleged shapeshifter
- Boyan (bard) (10th–11th century), a bard active at the court of Yaroslav the Wise
- Boyan (Hasidic dynasty), a dynasty of Hasidic Jewish rabbis
- Boyan Ensemble, touring choir of the L. Revutsky Capella of Ukraine
- Boyan-Enravota (died 833), the first Bulgarian Christian martyr and the earliest Bulgarian saint
- Bayan of the Baarin or Boyan (1236–1295), Mongol general
- Bayan of the Merkid or Boyan (died 1340), Mongol general

== Ethnic group ==
- The indigenous people from Bawean Island

== Places ==
- 3681 Boyan, a main-belt asteroid
- Boyan (village), a village in Venets Municipality, Shumen Province, Bulgaria
- Boyan, Wu'an, town in southern Hebei, China
- Boyan Botevo, a village in Mineralni Bani, in Haskovo Province, Bulgaria
- Boyan, the Yiddish name of Boiany, a city in Bukovina
- Boyan, an alternative name for Bawean, an island in Indonesia
- Kampung Boyan, place in Malaysia

== See also ==
- Boyana (disambiguation)
