= Boyana (disambiguation) =

Boyana is a neighbourhood of the Bulgarian capital of Sofia.

Boyana may also refer to:

== People ==
- Boyana (given name), a common Bulgarian given name

== Places ==
- Boyana, Varna Province, a village in Bulgaria
- Boyana Glacier on Livingston Island, South Shetland Islands

== See also ==
- Bojana (disambiguation)
- Boyan (disambiguation)
