= Russian cruiser Bayan (1907) =

Russian Bayan-class cruiser

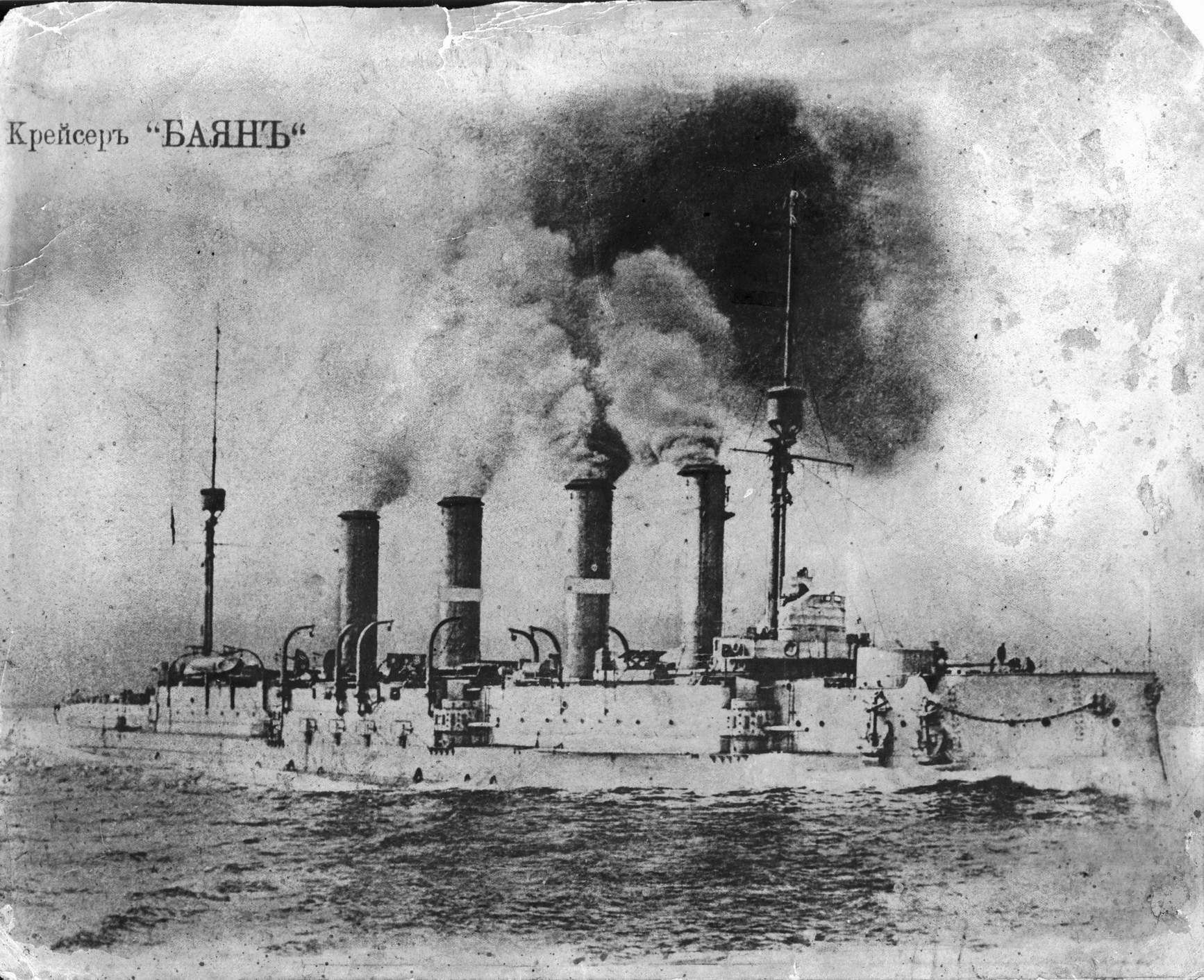
- A postcard of Bayan at sea

History

Russian Empire
- Name: Bayan
- Namesake: Boyan
- Builder: Admiralty Shipyard, Saint Petersburg, Russia
- Laid down: 15 August 1905 (Note: All dates used in this article are New Style)
- Launched: 15 August 1907
- Completed: 13 December 1911
- Fate: Sold for scrap, 1922

General characteristics
- Class & type: Bayan-class armored cruiser
- Displacement: 7,750 long tons (7,874 t) standard
- Length: 449.6 ft (137.0 m)
- Beam: 57 ft 6 in (17.5 m)
- Draught: 22 ft (6.7 m)
- Installed power: 16,500 ihp (12,300 kW); 26 Belleville boilers
- Propulsion: 2 shafts; 2 VTE steam engines
- Speed: 21 knots (39 km/h; 24 mph)
- Complement: 568
- Armament: 2 × 1 - 203 mm (8 in) guns; 8 × 1 - 152 mm (6 in) guns; 22 × 1 - 75 mm (3.0 in) guns; 2 × 450 mm (18 in) torpedo tubes
- Armour: Krupp armor; Waterline belt: 90–175 mm (3.5–6.9 in); Deck: 50 mm (2.0 in); Gun turrets: 132 mm (5.2 in); Casemates: 60 mm (2.4 in); Conning tower: 136 mm (5.4 in)

Bayan (Russian: Баянъ) was the third of the four Bayan-class armoured cruisers built for the Imperial Russian Navy in the early 1900s. The ship was assigned to the Baltic Fleet. She was modified to lay mines shortly after World War I began. Bayan laid mines herself and provided cover for other ships laying minefields. The ship fought several inconclusive battles with German ships during the war, including the Battle of Åland Islands in mid-1915. She also participated in the Battle of Moon Sound during the German invasion of the Estonian islands in late 1917, where she was damaged. Bayan was decommissioned in 1918 and sold for scrap in 1922.

== Design and description ==
Bayan was 449.6 feet (137.0 m) long overall. She had a maximum beam of 57.5 feet (17.5 m), a draught of 26 feet (7.9 m) and displaced 7,750 long tons (7,870 t). The ship had a crew of 568 officers and men. Bayan was named in honor of the earlier Russian cruiser of the same class captured by the Japanese during the Russo-Japanese War. Both ships were named for the legendary bard, Boyan.

The ship had two vertical triple-expansion steam engines with a designed total of 16,500 indicated horsepower (12,304 kW), but they developed 19,320 indicated horsepower (14,410 kW) on sea trials and drove the ship to a maximum speed of 22.55 knots (41.76 km/h; 25.95 mph). 26 Belleville boilers provided steam for the engines. She could carry a maximum of 1,100 long tons (1,118 t) of coal, although her range is unknown.

Bayan's main armament consisted of two 8-inch (203 mm) 45-calibre guns in single turrets fore and aft. Her eight 6-inch (152 mm) guns were mounted in casemates on the sides of the ship's hull. Anti-torpedo boat defense was provided by twenty-two 75-millimetre (3.0 in) 50-calibre guns; eight were mounted in casemates on the side of the hull and in the superstructure. In the admiral's apartments, two guns were astern, and the remaining twelve were located on upper deck amidships (eight above the six-inch gun casemates), in pivot mounts with gun shields. The ship also had two submerged 450-millimetre (18 in) torpedo tubes, one mounted on each broadside.

In early 1916, eight of the ship's 75 mm guns in the central casemate were removed, and in early 1917, the rest were removed as well. By early 1917, an additional eight-inch gun was fitted on the centreline forward of the mainmast (it was supposed to be protected with a gun shield, but the photos do not confirm this). In addition, four more six-inch guns were added on an upper deck, two on each broadside. In early 1917, Bayan was also fitted with two anti-aircraft 76 mm Lender guns, mounted to the sides of the after turret.

The ship used Krupp armour throughout. Her waterline belt was 175 millimetres (6.9 in) thick over her machinery spaces, reducing to 90 millimetres (3.5 in) towards the lower edge. Fore and aft, it reduced to 100 millimetres (3.9 in). The upper belt and casemates were 60 millimetres (2.4 in) thick. The armour deck was 50 millimetres (2 in) thick; over the central battery it was a single plate, but elsewhere it consisted of a 30-millimetre (1.2 in) plate over two 10-millimetre (0.39 in) plates. The gun turrets were protected by 132 millimetres (5.2 in) of armour and the conning tower had walls 136 millimetres (5.4 in) thick.

== Service ==
The Admiralty Shipyard in Saint Petersburg built Bayan. Construction began on 15 August 1905, although she was ceremonially laid down only on the day of her launching, 15 August 1907. Bayan was completed in early 1911 and commissioned on 14 July 1911. She spent her entire career with the Baltic Fleet.

Bayan was assigned to the First Cruiser Brigade when World War I began. Shortly after the start of the war, in December 1914, Bayan was modified to carry up to 110 mines. She laid her first mines in early December when she was one of a group of ships that mined the northern and western entrances to the Gulf of Danzig. The following month, she provided cover as other cruisers laid minefields west of the Baltic Sea, near Bornholm and Rügen Islands on the night of 12 January 1915. Together with her sister Admiral Makarov and two protected cruisers, she fought a brief and inconclusive action with the light cruiser SMS München during the night of 6/7 May while covering a minelaying sortie off Libau.

On 2 July, the ship participated in the Battle of Åland Islands when intercepted and decoded Wireless signals informed the Russians that a small German force was at sea to lay a minefield off Åland. Rear Admiral Mikhail Bakhirev was already at sea with Admiral Makarov, Bayan, Rurik, the protected cruisers Bogatyr and Oleg, and the destroyer Novik en route to bombard Memel. Rurik and Novik got separated from the others in the fog. Still, the rest of the force encountered the light cruiser SMS Augsburg and several destroyers escorting the minelayer SMS Albatross. The Russians concentrated on Albatross, which was forced to run aground in Swedish territorial waters, while the faster Augsburg escaped to the south. The Russian cruisers were low on ammunition when they encountered two more German cruisers and broke off the action after Bayan and the armoured cruiser SMS Roon exchanged hits. Bayan fired 40 eight-inch rounds and was hit with one 210 mm round amidships, which caused superficial damage and wounds to two crewmen. Roon lost her wireless aerial due to a near miss; the Russians reported more hits but not confirmed.

=== Battle of Moon Sound ===
In 1917, Bayan was the flagship of Vice Admiral Bakhirev, who now commanded the naval forces defending the Gulf of Riga. During Operation Albion, the invasion of the Estonian islands of Saaremaa (Ösel), Hiiumaa (Dagö) and Muhu (Moon) in October 1917, the ship defended the southern entrance to Moon Sound on 17 October. When the German minesweepers cleared the minefields guarding the entrance, Bayan attacked them and the predreadnought Grazhdanin. In contrast, the predreadnought Slava engaged the dreadnoughts König and Kronprinz, defending the minesweepers. Slava was hit multiple times by the German ships, and Bakirev ordered his forces to withdraw. Bayan was the last ship to withdraw, but she was shot once by a 30.5-centimetre (12.0 in) shell from König before she moved out of range. The shell penetrated the deck near the forward turret and started a fire among the flammable material in the cable compartment that was not extinguished until the next day. Fragments from the shell destroyed a bulkhead and loosened some plates of the ship's bottom. The location of the fire near the forward magazine forced it to be flooded as a precaution. Between the leaky plates and the flooded magazine, the ship took about 1,000 long tons (1,000 t) aboard, and her draught forward increased to 26 feet (7.9 m). The shell killed five men and wounded three more. (Note: According to the Bayan's commander, Captain S. Timiryov, the casualties of the Koenig's shell were members of the revolutionary committee, who had decided to run a meeting there against "a criminal conduct of the ship's command, risking seamen's lives in a battle with stronger enemy". The crew reportedly commented on the accident as God's punishment. Vinogradov & Fedechkin, p. 196) Despite her increased draught, Bayan could pass through the dredged channel connecting the northern and southern parts of Moon Sound later that day. When the general withdrawal was ordered the following day, the ship sailed for Finland.

She was paid off in 1918 and did not participate in the Russian Civil War. Bayan was sold for scrap in 1922 and broken up in Stettin.
