= Russian cruiser Bayan =

Two Russian cruisers have been named Bayan:

- Russian cruiser Bayan (1900), the lead ship of the Bayan class, captured by the Empire of Japan during the Russo-Japanese War in 1905 and renamed Aso, ultimately sunk as a target ship in 1932
- Russian cruiser Bayan (1907), fourth member of the Bayan class, scrapped in the early 1920s
