= Pockar =

Pockar is a surname. Notable people with the surname include:

- Bojan Počkar (1963–1996), Slovenian mountain climber
- Brian Pockar (1959–1992), Canadian figure skater
