= Bojan Marjanović =

Serbian-born pianist and composer (born 1981)

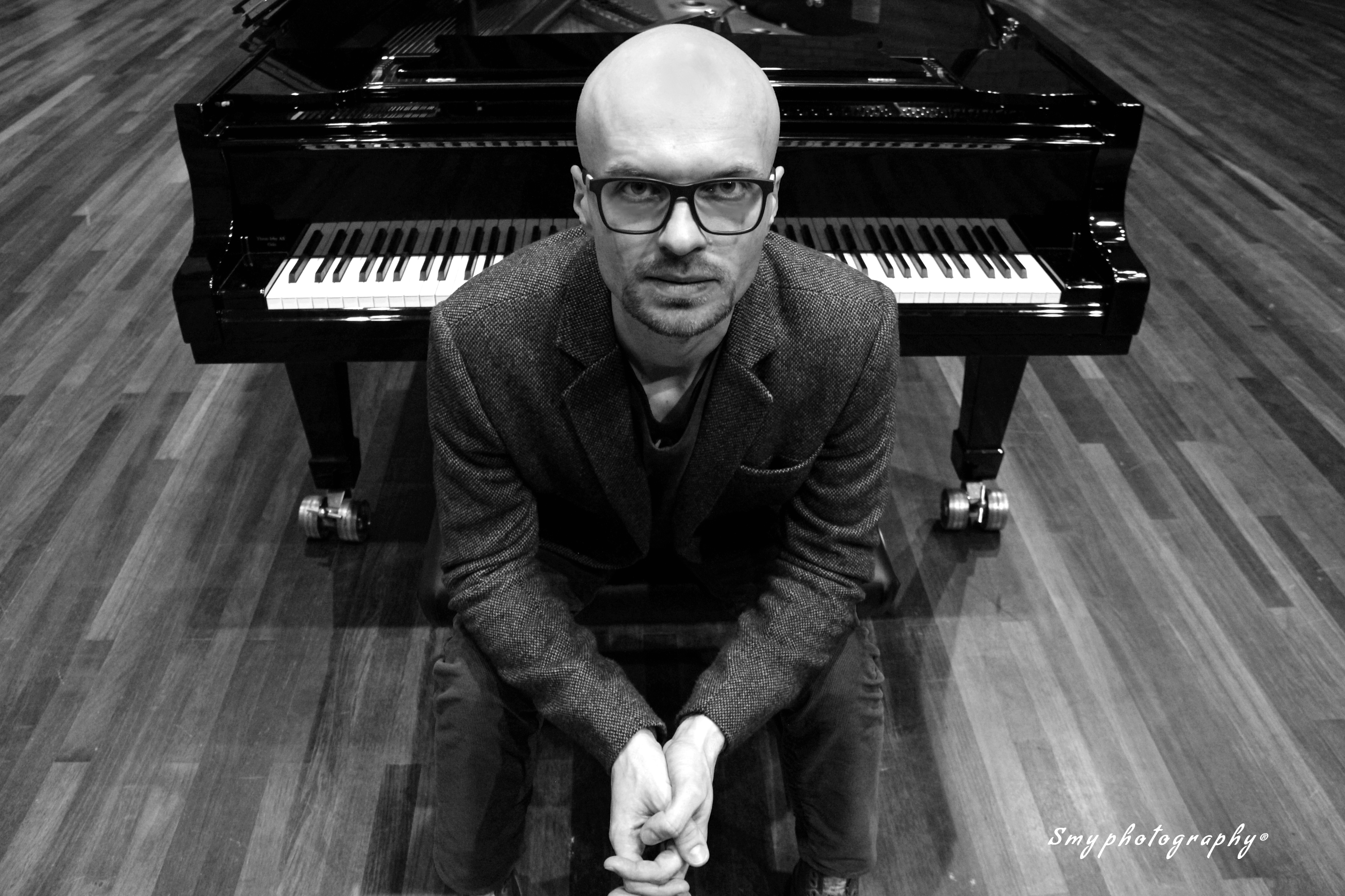

Background information
- Born: 26 October 1981 (age 44); Yugoslavia
- Origin: Serbia
- Genres: Jazz, classical
- Occupations: Musician, composer
- Instrument: Piano
- Labels: AMP Music & Records, Losen Records
- Website: www.bojanmarjanovic.com

Bojan Marjanović (Serbian Cyrillic: Бојан Марјановић; born 26 October 1981) is a Serbian pianist and composer based in Oslo, Norway. Bojan's musical competences and interests range from the genre of classical to improvised music and contemporary jazz. In the last years, he has been active at the Norwegian jazz scene within different projects and collaborations.

In his career, Marjanović has been awarded at national and international levels, including both piano competitions and different honors. Along with the most prominent concert stages in his native country, Bojan has performed in several European countries, Canada and in the United States. In the area of classical music, Bojan's interests have been related to the integral performance of piano masterworks, such as Chopin's etudes, scherzos, preludes etc.

== Biography and academics ==
Marjanović grew up in Valjevo, Serbia, where he started playing piano at the age of 15. Having graduated from a music high school "Živorad Grbić" in his hometown, Bojan continued studying classical piano performance at the Faculty of Music in Belgrade with a renowned Serbian professor Nevena Popović. In addition, he has studied with Aleksandar Madžar, Cordelia Höfer, Jean-François Antonioli, Yuri Kot, André Marchand and Kyoko Hashimoto. He received a Bachelor, Master's and DMA degree in classical piano performance from the Faculty of Music in Belgrade. Simultaneously he was involved in jazz and other genres which he transcribed and learned by ear.

In 2016, Marjanović moved to Oslo, Norway, where he completed his Master's degree in Jazz Piano performance and Continuing studies in Jazz Composition at the Norwegian Academy of Music. In Oslo, his mentors were Eyolf Dale and Helge Sunde. Along with his studies in Norway, Marjanović took a semester at Berklee College of Music where he studied Jazz arranging and composition with Steve Rochinski, Joseph Mulholland and Brian Lewis. Marjanović currently lives in Oslo where he works as a pianist, composer and educator.

== Career ==
Since 2004, Marjanović has been active in the Serbian music scene, both as a classical and a jazz musician. The prize at Debut International Piano Competition provided him with an opportunity for debut recital at Carnegie Hall in New York City in 2014. In Norway, Marjanović got the opportunity to participate in many projects and to perform with some famous Norwegian jazz musicians such as Ole Morten Vågan, Thomas Strønen, Atle Nymo etc. He has given numerous performances (both solo and with different ensembles) at festivals and concerts in most European countries, as well as in Canada and the United States.

== Awards and honors ==
- 2014: "Stanojlo Rajičić Award" for the best concert performed at Serbian Academy of Sciences and Arts within 2013 season
- 2014: 3rd prize at "Debut International Piano Competition" in New York City
- 2013: Nomination for "Nagrada grada Beograda"
- 2006: Finalist at "3rd Isidor Bajić Piano Memorial" - Piano Competition in Novi Sad
- 2006: "Slobodanka Milošević-Savić Fund Prize" - Faculty of Music in Belgrade
- 2005: "Katarina Aćimović Fund Prize" - Faculty of Music in Belgrade
- 2002: 2nd prize at "Yugoslavian Federal Piano Competition" in Niš

== Discography ==
=== As a leader/co-leader ===
- 2022: Don´t Take It So Personally, HÜM, (Losen Records)
- 2018: V, with Uroš Spasojević (AMP Music & Records)

=== Albums as a sideman/guest ===
- 2026: Heroin Chic, Solveig Sørbø, Maria Kjos Fonn (Solsnu)
- 2022: 2.0, Uroš Spasojević Project (Metropolis Records)
- 2019: 1.5, Uroš Spasojević Project
- 2018: Roots, Almir Mešković & Daniel Lazar (Etnisk musikklubb)
- 2018: Where the Fishes Dance, Laila Angell (Lydmuren)
- 2014: Portrait in Bass, Uroš Spasojević Project
