= Boyan (given name) =

- Pronunciation: [boˈjan]
- Gender: Male

Origin
- Language: Slavic
- Origin: boy "battle"
- Derivation: boy- (root) + an (suffix)

Other names
- Related names: Bojan

Boyan (Bulgarian: Боян) is a Slavic male given name. The short form of the name Boyan used in Bulgaria is Bobi or Bobby (Bulgarian: Боби). Its female equivalent is Boyana (Bulgarian: Бояна).

In present days it is used as a given name in Bulgaria written as Boyan (Bulgarian: Боян), and also in all countries of former Yugoslavia, mainly written as Bojan (Serbian and Macedonian: Бојан)/(Slovenian/Croatian: Bojan).

The name is recorded in historical sources among the Bulgarians, and also among Serbs, Czechs, Poles, Croats, Slovenians, Macedonians, Ukrainians and Russians.

== Etymology ==
There is some discussion as to where the name Boyan comes from. It is generally accepted that it is derived from the word бой- (boy-), which means "battle", and the suffix -ан (-an) which is common in Bulgarian and other Slavic names. Together, Boyan (Боян) means "warrior" or "fighter".

It is also considered as a possibility from the Mongolic word "Bayan" (Mongolian: Баян) meaning rich, wealth, of the khagan of Avars Bayan I (562–602), and of the Bulgars Batbayan (665–668); from the name of Bohemia, the area of modern Czech Republic, in Serbian as Bojka (White Serbia), where lived the Celtic tribe Boii; from the Celtic Bryan or Brian which shares spelling and meaning similarity. Therefore, according to the Celtic origin of the name Bryan or Brian, the Slavic name Boyan or Bojan could have the meaning "strong" or "noble".

== Notable people ==
- Batbayan of Bulgaria, also known as Batboyan or simply Boyan. The first son of Bulgarian khan Kubrat.
- Boyan-Enravota, the first Bulgarian Christian martyr and the earliest Bulgarian saint
- Boyan the Mage, a 10th century Bulgarian prince and alleged shapeshifter
- Boyan (bard), Rus' bard from the 10th century
- Boyanka Angelova, Bulgarian gymnast
- Boyan Chowdhury, former lead guitarist of rock band The Zutons
- Boyan Iliev, Bulgarian football player
- Boyan Jovanovic, professor of economics at New York University
- Boyan Kotsev, Bulgarian cyclist
- Boyan Petkanchin, Bulgarian mathematician
- Boyan Peykov, Bulgarian footballer
- Boyan Radev (1942–2025), Bulgarian wrestler
- Boyan Slat (born 1994), Dutch inventor and entrepreneur
- Boyan Tabakov, Bulgarian football player
- Boyan Vodenitcharov, Bulgarian pianist and composer
- Boyan Yordanov, Bulgarian volleyball player

== Places ==
- Boyana, neighbourhood of the Bulgarian capital of Sofia
- Boyana Church, medieval Bulgarian Orthodox church situated in the Boyana neighbourhood
- Boyana Glacier on Livingston Island in the South Shetland Islands, Antarctica, which is named for Boyana neighbourhood.
- Boian, village in Chernivtsi Oblast of the Ukraine. Historical Bukovyna.

== See also ==
- Bojan
- Boyana (given name)
- Bulgarian name
- Serbian name
- Slavic names
