= Russian cruiser Bayan (1900) =

Imperial Russian Navy's Bayan-class armoured cruiser

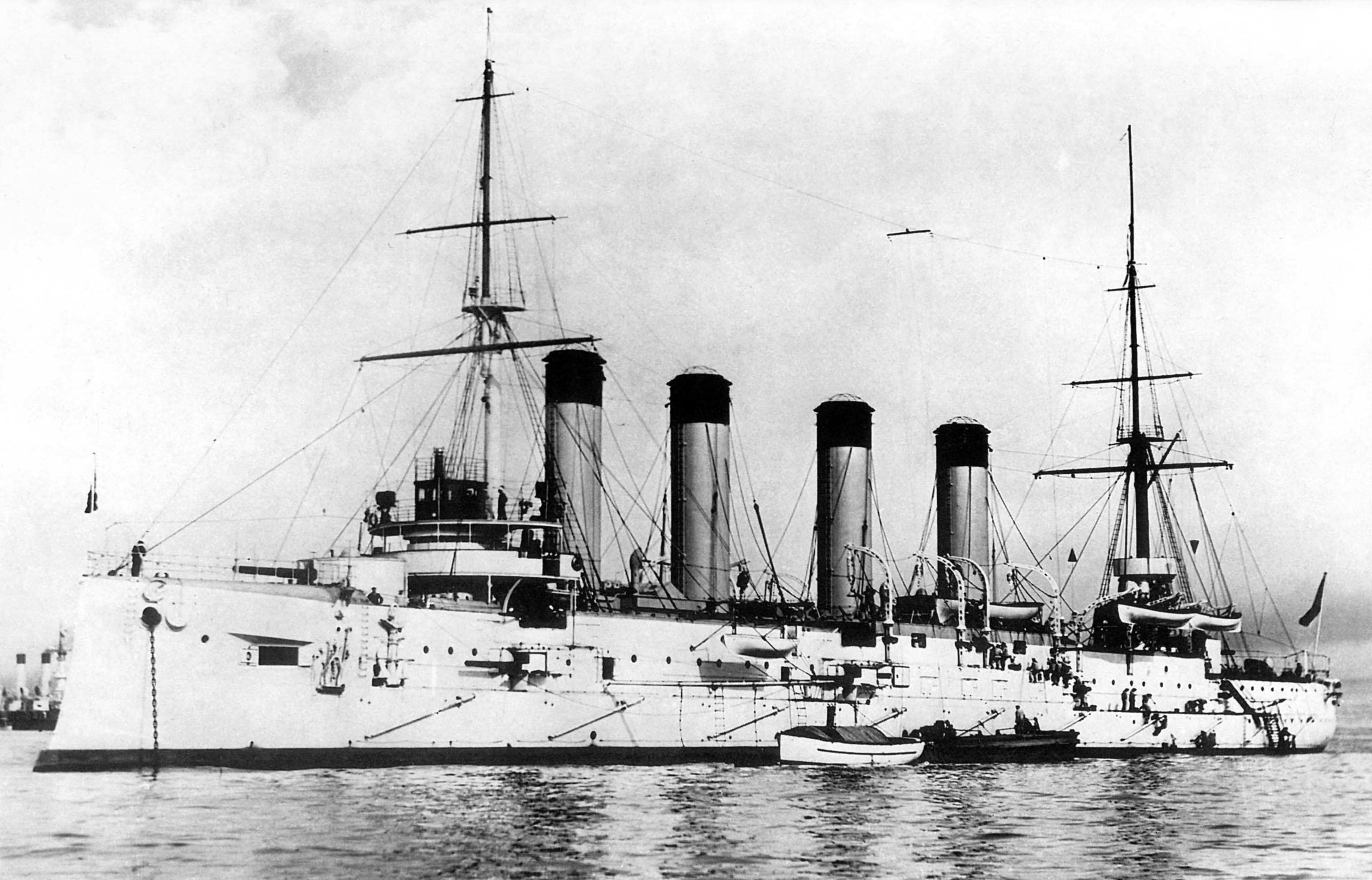
- Bayan at anchor

History

Russian Empire
- Name: Bayan
- Namesake: Boyan
- Ordered: May 1898
- Builder: Forges et Chantiers de la Méditerranée, La Seyne-sur-Mer, France
- Laid down: March 1899
- Launched: 12 June 1900
- Completed: December 1902
- Captured: By Japan, 1 January 1905
- Fate: Sunk, 9 December 1904

Japan
- Name: Aso
- Namesake: Mount Aso
- Acquired: 1 January 1905
- Commissioned: 22 August 1905
- In service: 1908
- Reclassified: As a training ship, 1908; As a minelayer, 1 April 1920
- Stricken: 1 April 1930
- Fate: Sunk as a target, 4 August 1932

General characteristics
- Class & type: Bayan-class armoured cruiser
- Displacement: 7,802 long tons (7,927 t)
- Length: 449 ft (136.9 m)
- Beam: 57 ft 6 in (17.5 m)
- Draught: 22 ft (6.7 m)
- Installed power: 26 Belleville boilers; 16,500 ihp (12,300 kW)
- Propulsion: 2 shafts, 2 vertical triple-expansion steam engines
- Speed: 21 kn (39 km/h; 24 mph)
- Range: 3,900 nmi (7,200 km; 4,500 mi) at 10 knots (19 km/h; 12 mph)
- Complement: 573
- Armament: As built: 2 × single 8 in (203 mm) guns 8 × single 6 in (152 mm) guns 20 × single 75 mm (3 in) guns 2 × single 15 in (380 mm) torpedo tubes As Aso: 2 × single 8 in (203 mm) guns 8 × single 6.0 in (152 mm) guns 16 × single 3 in (76 mm) guns 2 × single 18 in (460 mm) torpedo tubes
- Armour: Belt: 3.9–7.9 inches (100–200 mm); Deck: 2.0 inches (50 mm); Gun turrets: 6.3 inches (160 mm); Barbettes: 6.7 in (170 mm); Conning tower: 6.3 in (160 mm)

Bayan (Russian: Баян) was the name ship of the four Bayan-class armoured cruisers built for the Imperial Russian Navy in the first decade of the 20th century. The ship had to be built in France because there was no available capacity in Russia. Bayan was assigned to the First Pacific Squadron after completion and based at Port Arthur from the end of 1903. She suffered minor damage during the Battle of Port Arthur at the beginning of the Russo-Japanese War of 1904–05 and supported destroyers as they patrolled outside the harbour. After bombarding Japanese positions in July 1904, the ship struck a mine and was out of action for the next several months. Bayan was sunk during the Siege of Port Arthur and was then salvaged by the Japanese after the war.

Renamed Aso by the Imperial Japanese Navy (IJN) she served as a training ship after extensive repairs. The ship was converted into a minelayer in 1917 and was decommissioned in 1930 to serve as a target ship. She was eventually sunk as a target in 1932.

== Design and description ==
Unlike previous Russian armoured cruisers, the Bayan-class ships were designed as scouts for the fleet. They were 449 feet 7 inches (137.0 m) long overall and 443 feet (135.0 m) between perpendiculars. They had a maximum beam of 57 feet 6 inches (17.5 m), a draft of 22 feet (6.7 m) and displaced 7,802 long tons (7,927 t). The ships had a crew of 573 officers and men.

The Bayan class had two vertical triple-expansion steam engines, each driving a single propeller shaft using steam provided by 26 Belleville boilers. Designed for a total of 16,500 indicated horsepower (12,304 kW) intended to propel the cruisers at 21 knots (39 km/h; 24 mph), the engines actually developed 17,400 ihp (13,000 kW) during Bayan's sea trials in October 1902 and drove the ship to a maximum speed of 20.9 knots (38.7 km/h; 24.1 mph). She could carry a maximum of 1,100 long tons (1,118 t) of coal, which gave her a range of 3,900 nautical miles (7,200 km; 4,500 mi) at 10 knots (19 km/h; 12 mph).

Bayan's main armament consisted of two 8-inch (203 mm) 45-calibre guns in single turrets fore and aft of the superstructure. Her eight 6-inch (152 mm) guns were mounted in casemates on the sides of the ship's hull. Anti-torpedo boat defence was provided by twenty 75-millimetre (3.0 in) 50-calibre guns; eight of these were mounted in casemates on the side of the hull and in the superstructure. The remaining guns were located above the six-inch gun casemates in pivot mounts with gun shields. Bayan also mounted eight 47-millimetre (1.9 in) and two 37-millimetre (1.5 in) Hotchkiss guns. The ship had two submerged 15-inch (381 mm) torpedo tubes, one on each broadside.

The ship used Harvey armour throughout. Her waterline belt was 7.9 inches (200 mm) thick over her machinery spaces. Fore and aft, it reduced to 3.9 inches (100 mm). The upper armour strake and the armour protecting the casemates was 2.4 inches (60 mm) thick. The thickness of the armoured deck was 2 inches (50 mm); over the central battery it was a single plate, but elsewhere it consisted of a 1.2-inch (30 mm) plate over two 0.39-inch (10 mm) plates. The gun turret sides were protected by 5.9 inches (150 mm) of armour and their roofs were 1.2 inches thick. The barbettes were protected by armour plates 6.7-inch (170 mm) thick. The sides of the conning tower were 6.3 inches (160 mm) thick.

== Construction and career ==
Bayan, named after the bard Boyan, had to be ordered in May 1898 from the French shipyard Forges et Chantiers de la Méditerranée in La Seyne-sur-Mer because there was no capacity available in Russian shipyards. The ship was laid down in February 1899 and launched on 12 June 1900. (Note: All dates used in this article are New Style) Bayan was completed in February 1903 and, under the command of Captain 1st Rank Robert Wiren, made port visits in Greece, Italy and North Africa before sailing for Kronstadt. Arriving in April 1903, she was only there for several months before departing for Port Arthur on 7 August. Together with the French-built battleship Tsesarevich, Bayan arrived on 2 December and they were both assigned to the First Pacific Squadron.

On the night of 8/9 February 1904, the IJN launched a surprise attack on the Russian fleet at Port Arthur. Bayan was not hit by the initial torpedo-boat incursion and sortied the following morning when the Combined Fleet, commanded by Vice Admiral Tōgō Heihachirō, attacked. Tōgō had expected the surprise night attack by his ships to be much more successful than it was, anticipating that the Russians would be badly disorganized and weakened, but they had recovered from their surprise and were ready for his assault. The Japanese vessels had been spotted by the protected cruiser Boyarin, which was patrolling offshore, and alerted the Russian defences. Tōgō chose to attack the Russian coastal defences with his main armament and engage the ships with his secondary guns. Splitting his fire proved to be a poor decision as the Japanese eight-inch (203 mm) and six-inch guns inflicted inconsequential damage on the Russian ships, which concentrated all their fire on their opponents with some effect. Bayan suffered superficial damage from nine hits and numerous splinters; 6 crewmen were killed and 35 injured. The ship fired 28 eight-inch, 100 six-inch and 160 seventy-five-millimetre shells during the battle.

The damage to Bayan was repaired in several days and subsequently the cruiser patrolled off Port Arthur. Together with the protected cruiser Novik, the ship sortied on 11 March 1904 to support the destroyer Steregushchiy. Under attack by Japanese destroyers, the ship was sunk before help arrived. Early on the morning of 13 April, the Russian destroyer Strashnii fell in with four Japanese destroyers in the darkness while on patrol. Once her captain realized his mistake, the Russian ship attempted to escape but failed after a Japanese shell struck one of her torpedoes and caused it to detonate. By this time Bayan had sortied to provide support, but was only able to rescue five survivors before a Japanese squadron of protected cruisers attacked. Vice Admiral Stepan Makarov led a force of two battleships and three cruisers out to support Bayan and also ordered the rest of the First Pacific Squadron to follow as soon as they could. In the meantime, the Japanese had reported the Russian sortie to Tōgō and he arrived with all six Japanese battleships. Heavily outnumbered, Makarov ordered his ships to retreat and to join the rest of the squadron that was just exiting the harbour. En route, however, his flagship, Petropavlovsk, struck a mine and sank almost instantly.

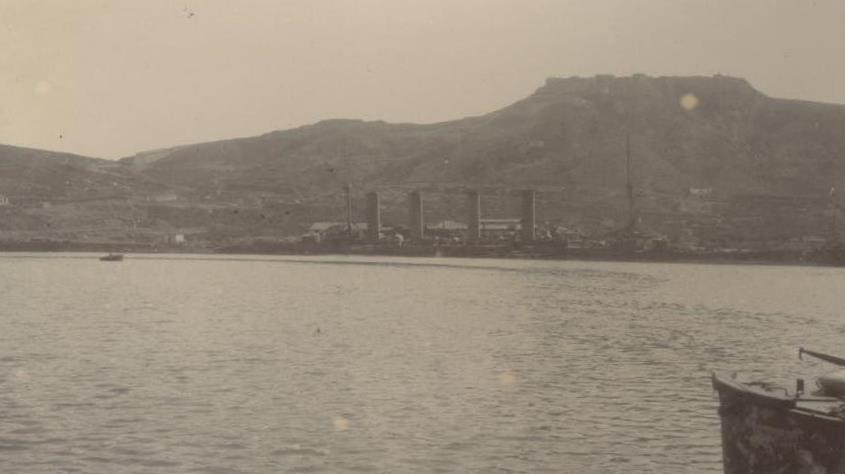
Bayan sunk at her mooring in Port Arthur.

Bayan sailed with the rest of the Pacific Squadron on 23 June in an abortive attempt to reach Vladivostok. The new squadron commander, Rear Admiral Wilgelm Vitgeft, ordered the squadron to return to Port Arthur when it encountered the Japanese fleet shortly before sunset, as he did not wish to engage his numerically superior opponents in a night battle. After bombarding Imperial Japanese Army positions on 27 July, the ship struck a mine and was under repair until September. After the death of Vitgeft during the Battle of the Yellow Sea on 10 August, Wiren was promoted to rear admiral and became the commander of the First Pacific Squadron. Bayan was subsequently trapped in Port Arthur and sunk at her mooring by five 28-centimetre (11 in) howitzer shells on 9 December.

=== Japanese service ===
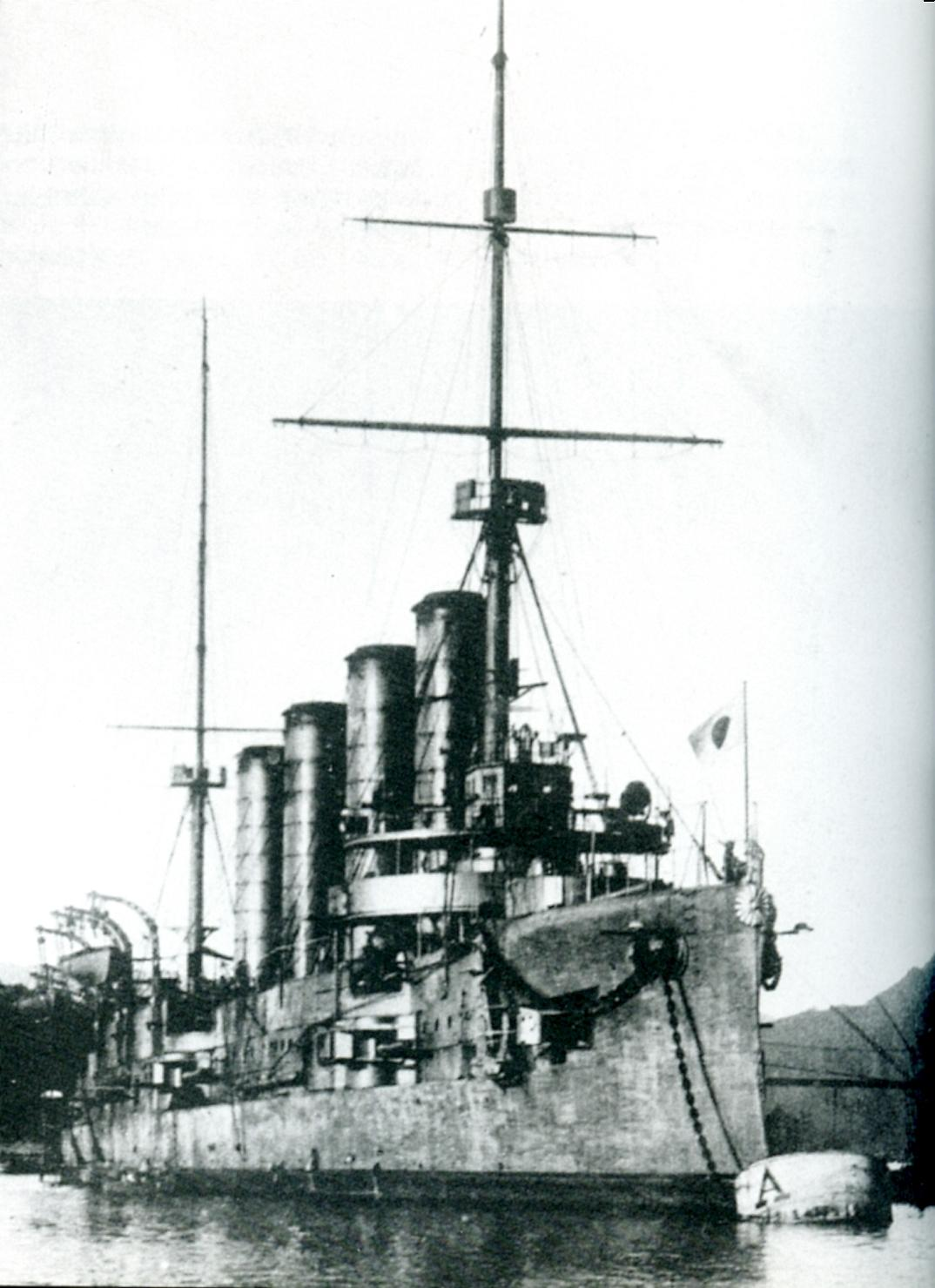
Aso at Maizuru, 1908

After the war, Bayan's wreck was refloated on 24 June and towed to Dairen. There she was given temporary repairs and commissioned as Aso (named after a volcano in Kumamoto Prefecture) on 22 August. The next day she was towed to Maizuru, Japan for permanent repairs that lasted until July 1908. During this time, her boilers were replaced by Miyabara water-tube boilers and the majority of her armament was replaced with Japanese weapons. Aso was armed with two original 8-inch 45 caliber guns, eight 6-inch 45 caliber Armstrong GG guns, and sixteen 3-inch 40 caliber Armstrong N guns.

On 7 September 1908, Aso, together with the ex-Russian protected cruiser Soya, was assigned to the Training Squadron. On 14 March 1909 they began a training cruise that took their naval cadets to the West Coast of the United States and Canada and Hawaii before they returned to Yokosuka on 7 August. The next year the two ships made a cruise to Australia and Southeast Asia that lasted from 1 February to 3 July 1910. They were briefly relieved of their assignment to the Training Squadron on 25 September before rejoining it on 1 April 1911. The next training cruise lasted from 25 November 1911 to 28 March 1912 and took the cadets to the same destinations as the 1910 cruise. On 20 April 1912, Aso was transferred away from the Training Squadron and she was refitted in March 1913. During this refit, her eight-inch guns were replaced by a pair of six-inch guns 50 caliber guns and her torpedo tubes were removed. Aso and Soya were reassigned to the Training Squadron on 1 December 1914 and they made their last training cruise from 20 April to 23 August 1915, during which they visited Rabaul, New Guinea, and Fremantle, Australia.

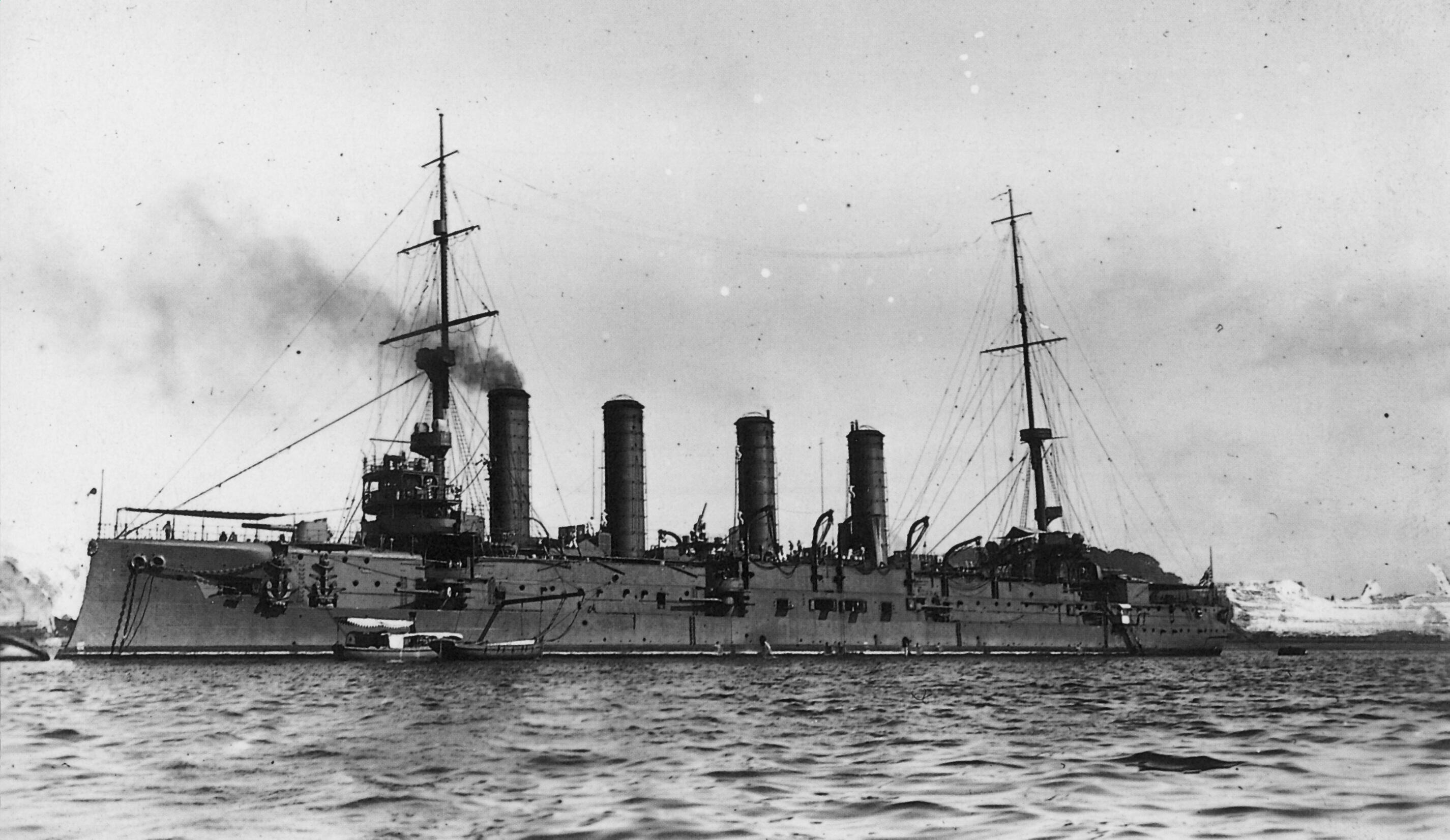
Aso at Yokosuka, 1924

In 1917, Aso was converted into a minelayer, with a capacity of 420 mines, although she was not formally reclassified as such until 1 April 1920. Aso was stricken from the navy list on 1 April 1930 and renamed Hai Kan No. 4. She was sunk on 4 August 1932 by two submarine torpedoes after serving as a target for the heavy cruisers Myōkō and Nachi.

== Bibliography ==
- Budzbon, Przemysław (1985). "Russia". In Gray, Randal (ed.). Conway's All the World's Fighting Ships 1906–1921. Annapolis, Maryland: Naval Institute Press. pp. 291–325. ISBN 0-85177-245-5.
- Campbell, N. J. M. (1979). "Russia". In Chesneau, Roger & Kolesnik, Eugene M. (eds.). Conway's All the World's Fighting Ships 1860–1905. New York: Mayflower Books. pp. 170–217. ISBN 0-8317-0302-4.
- Corbett, Julian S. (1994). Maritime Operations in the Russo-Japanese War. Annapolis, Maryland & Newport, Rhode Island: Naval Institute Press & Naval War College Press. ISBN 1-55750-129-7.
- Hirama, Yoichi (2004). "Japanese Naval Assistance and its Effect on Australian-Japanese Relations". In Phillips Payson O'Brien (ed.). The Anglo-Japanese Alliance, 1902–1922. London and New York: RoutledgeCurzon. pp. 140–58. ISBN 0-415-32611-7.
- Jentschura, Hansgeorg; Jung, Dieter & Mickel, Peter (1977). Warships of the Imperial Japanese Navy, 1869–1945. Annapolis, Maryland: United States Naval Institute. ISBN 0-87021-893-X.
- Kowner, Rotem (2006). Historical Dictionary of the Russo-Japanese War. Lanham, Maryland: The Scarecrow Press. ISBN 0-8108-4927-5.
- Lacroix, Eric & Wells, Linton (1997). Japanese Cruisers of the Pacific War. Annapolis, Maryland: Naval Institute Press. ISBN 0-87021-311-3.
- Lengerer, Hans (2008). "The Imperial Japanese Minelayers Itsukushima, Okinishima and Tsugaru". In Jordan, John (ed.). Warship 2008. London: Conway. pp. 52–66. ISBN 978-1-84486-062-3.
- McLaughlin, Stephen (1999). "From Ruirik to Ruirik: Russia's Armoured Cruisers". In Preston, Antony (ed.). Warship 1999–2000. London: Conway Maritime Press. ISBN 0-85177-724-4.
- Silverstone, Paul H. (1984). Directory of the World's Capital Ships. New York: Hippocrene Books. ISBN 0-88254-979-0.
- Vinogradov, Sergey & Fedechkin, Aleksey (2011). Bronenosnyi kreyser "Bayan" i yego potomki. Ot Port-Artura do Moonzunda (in Russian). Moscow: Yauza / EKSMO. ISBN 978-5-699-51559-2.
- Warner, Denis & Warner, Peggy (2002). The Tide at Sunrise: A History of the Russo-Japanese War, 1904–1905 (2nd ed.). London: Frank Cass. ISBN 0-7146-5256-3.
- Watts, Anthony J. (1990). The Imperial Russian Navy. London: Arms and Armour. ISBN 0-85368-912-1.
