= Bojana =

Bojana may refer to:

== Places ==
- Bojana (river), a river in Albania and Montenegro (known as Buna in Albanian)
- Ada Bojana / Bojana Island, an island in Montenegro
- Bojana, Croatia, a village near Čazma

== Name ==
- Bojana (given name), a Slavic given name
- People
  - Bojana Bobusic
  - Bojana Jovanovski
  - Bojana Novakovic
  - Bojana Ordinačev
  - Bojana Popović
  - Bojana Radulović
  - Bojana Živković
  - Bojana Asović
