= Russian cruiser Gromoboi =

Russian armoured cruiser

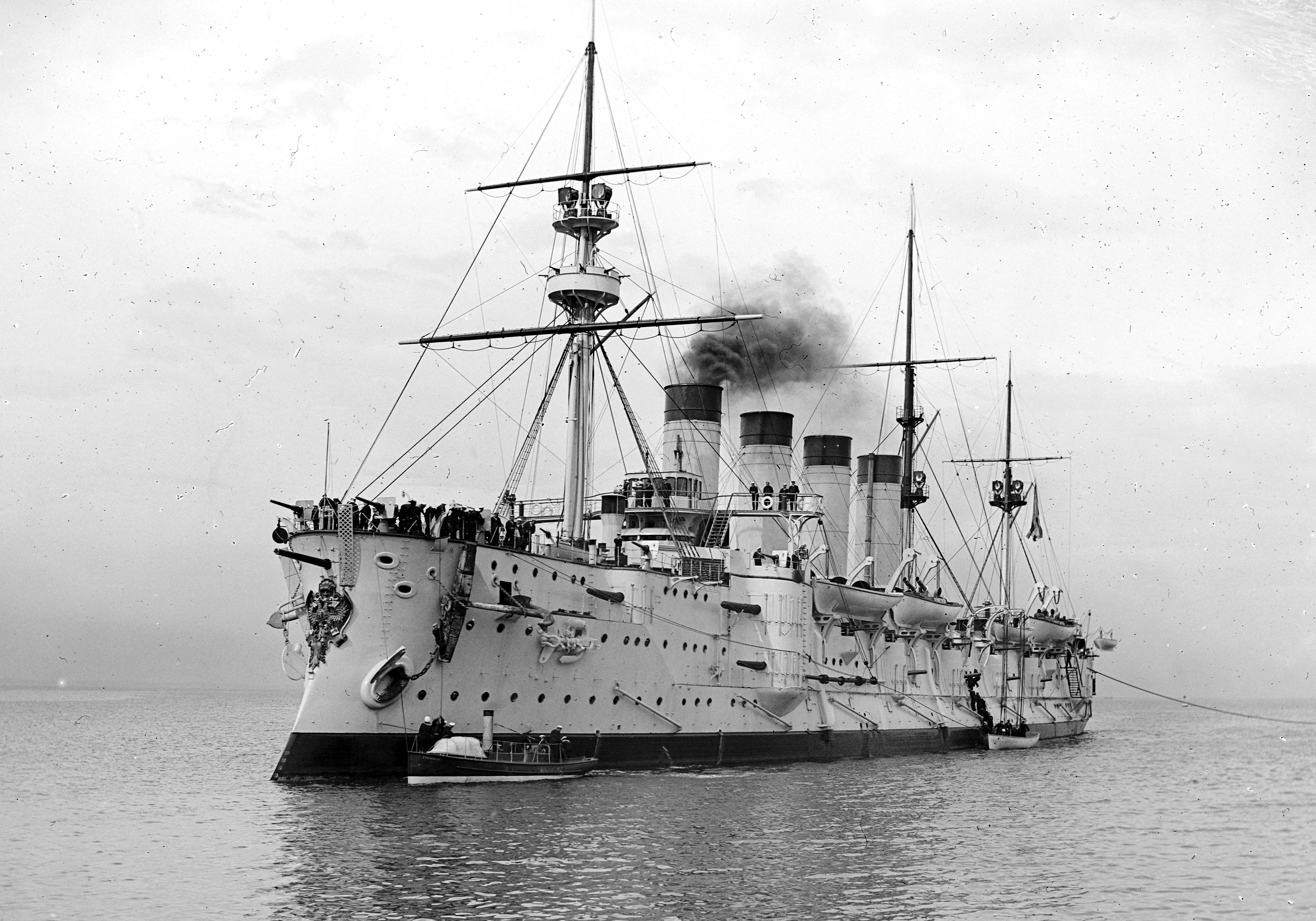
- Gromoboi in 1901 visiting Australia

Class overview
- Name: Gromoboi
- Operators: Imperial Russian Navy
- Preceded by: Rossia
- Succeeded by: Bayan class
- Built: 1897–1900
- In commission: 1900–1922
- Completed: 1
- Scrapped: 1

History

Russian Empire
- Name: Gromoboi (Russian: Громобой)
- Builder: Baltic Works, Saint Petersburg
- Laid down: 14 June 1897 (Note: All dates used in this article are New Style)
- Launched: 8 May 1899
- Commissioned: November 1899
- Fate: Sold for scrap, 1 July 1922

General characteristics
- Type: Armoured cruiser
- Displacement: 12,455 long tons (12,655 t)
- Length: 481 ft (146.6 m)
- Beam: 68.6 ft (20.9 m)
- Draught: 26 ft (7.9 m)
- Installed power: 14,500 ihp (10,800 kW)
- Propulsion: 3 shafts, 3 vertical triple expansion steam engines, 32 Belleville water-tube boilers
- Speed: 19 knots (35 km/h; 22 mph)
- Range: 8,100 nautical miles (15,000 km; 9,320 mi) at 10 knots (19 km/h; 12 mph)
- Complement: 874 officers and crewmen
- Armament: 4 × 1 - 8-inch (203 mm)/45 guns; 16 × 1 - 6-inch (152 mm)/45 guns; 24 × 1 - 75-millimetre (3.0 in)/50 guns; 12 × 1 - 47-millimetre (1.9 in)/43 guns; 18 × 1 - 37-millimetre (1.5 in)/23 guns; 4 × 15-inch (381 mm) torpedo tubes
- Armour: Harvey armour; Belt: 6 in (152 mm); Deck: 1.5–3 in (38–76 mm); Conning tower: 12 in (305 mm)

Gromoboi (Russian: Громобой, meaning: "Thunderer") was an armoured cruiser built for the Imperial Russian Navy in the late 1890s. She was designed as a long-range commerce raider and served as such during the Russo-Japanese War of 1904–05. When the war broke out, she was based in Vladivostok and made several sorties in search of Japanese shipping in the conflict's early months without much success.

Gromoboi, with the other armoured cruisers of the Vladivostok Cruiser Squadron, attempted to rendezvous in the Strait of Tsushima with the main portion of the Russian Pacific Fleet sailing from Port Arthur in August 1904. The Fleet was delayed, and the squadron returned to port alone. On the return, the squadron encountered a Japanese squadron of four armoured cruisers blocking their passage to base. The Japanese sank the oldest Russian ship, Rurik, and damaged Gromoboi and Rossia during the subsequent Battle off Ulsan. Both Russian ships were repaired within two months. Gromoboi ran aground immediately after completing her repairs and was out of action for four months. Three months after the damage from the grounding incident was repaired, she struck a mine, but successfully returned to port. Her armament was reinforced while under repair, but she saw no further action during the war.

Gromoboi was transferred to the Russian Baltic Fleet after the end of the war and began a lengthy refit that was completed in 1911. She was mostly inactive during World War I, but had her armament and protection upgraded during the war. She was placed into reserve in 1918 and sold to a German company in 1922 for scrapping. She was forced aground near Liepāja during a storm en route to Germany and was scrapped in place.

== Design and description ==
Gromoboi was originally intended to be a repeat of Rossia, but a design modification for thicker armour and improved engines made that unfeasible. The use of Rossia's hull design meant that the ships looked alike.

Gromoboi was 481 feet (146.6 m) long overall. She had a maximum beam of 68.6 feet (20.9 m) and a draught of 26 feet (7.9 m). The ship displaced 12,455 long tons (12,655 t), only 95 long tons (97 t) more than designed. She was sheathed in wood and copper to reduce biofouling. As completed Gromoboi trimmed badly by the bow, which reduced her speed and made her very wet forward. Loads had to be shifted aft and ballast added to the rear of the ship to correct her trim, but she was regarded as a good sea boat afterward with an easy, although rapid, roll.

=== Propulsion ===
Gromoboi dispensed with Rossia's cruising engine on the centre shaft. Three equally powerful vertical triple expansion steam engines were used with a designed total of 14,500 indicated horsepower (10,813 kW), but they developed 15,496 ihp (11,555 kW) on trials and drove the ship to a maximum speed of 20.1 knots (37.2 km/h; 23.1 mph). Thirty-two Belleville water-tube boilers provided steam for the engines. She could carry a maximum of 2,400 long tons (2,439 t) of coal. This gave her a radius of action of 8,100 nautical miles (15,000 km; 9,320 mi) at 10 knots (19 km/h; 12 mph).

=== Armament ===
Gromoboi's main armament consisted of four 8-inch (203 mm) 45-calibre Pattern 1892 guns; the forward pair was mounted in casemates above the forward main-deck 6-inch (152 mm) gun's casemate. The two rear guns were situated in sponsons abreast the mizzenmast, protected by gun shields. The guns could be depressed to −5° and elevated to 18°. They fired 193.5-pound (87.8 kg) projectiles at a muzzle velocity of 2,950 feet per second (900 m/s) which gave a range of 12,000 yd (11,000 m) at 13° elevation.

Her secondary armament consisted of sixteen 6-inch (152 mm)/45 Pattern 1892 guns. One gun was mounted under the forecastle and another in the stern; neither gun could fire to the side. Most of the remaining guns were mounted in casemates, the forward pair in front of the eight-inch guns on the upper deck and the rest on the main deck. One pair was mounted on the upper deck protected by gun shields. In their pivot mounts the guns could depress to -6° and elevate to +20°. They fired 91.4-pound (41.5 kg) Pattern 1907 high explosive projectiles at a muzzle velocity of 2,600 feet per second (790 m/s). This gave a range of 12,600 yd (11,500 m) at maximum elevation. 240 rounds per gun were carried by Gromoboi.

Defence against torpedo boats was provided by a variety of light-calibre weapons. Gromoboi had 24 75-millimetre (3.0 in) Canet Pattern 1892 50-caliber guns mounted in sponsons on the upper deck, protected by gun shields. The gun fired 10.8-pound (4.9 kg) shells to a range of about 8,600 yards (7,864 m) at its maximum elevation of 21° with a muzzle velocity of 2,700 ft/s (820 m/s). The rate of fire was between twelve and fifteen rounds per minute.

The ship carried twelve 47-millimetre (1.9 in) Hotchkiss guns. They fired a 3.3-pound (1.5 kg) shell at a muzzle velocity of 1,476 ft/s (450 m/s) at a rate of 20 rounds per minute to a range of 2,020 yards (1,850 m). The ship also carried 18 37-millimetre (1.5 in) Hotchkiss guns. These fired a 1.1-pound (0.50 kg) shell at a muzzle velocity of 1,450 ft/s (440 m/s) at a rate of 20 rounds per minute to a range of 3,038 yards (2,778 m).

Gromoboi also had four submerged 15-inch (381 mm) torpedo tubes, with two mounted on each broadside.

=== Armour ===
The Naval Ministry had hoped to increase the Gromoboi's armour thickness and increase the armour protection of the armament, but still use Rossia's hull design. The Ministry also hoped to use the new, more resistant Krupp armour, but Russian plants had proven unable to manufacture it when it was ordered and Harvey armour was used instead. (Note: Sources differ on the type of armour actually used. Brook, Gardiner and Grey, and Watts all state that Krupp cemented armour was used.) In fact, for Gromoboi, the waterline belt was reduced in thickness by 2 inches (51 mm) from the older ship to six inches to better protect her guns. The belt was shortened by 100 feet (30.5 m) in length to only 300 feet (91.4 m). It was reduced in height by 9 inches (229 mm) as well to a total of 7 feet 9 inches (2.4 m); it extended 2 feet 9 inches (0.8 m) above the waterline and 5 feet (1.5 m) below the waterline. The belt was closed off by six-inch bulkheads fore and aft.

Gromoboi's casemates were 4.7 inches (119 mm) thick, with two-inch backs and 1-inch (25 mm) roofs. The two-inch thick transverse bulkhead fore and aft protected them from raking fire. The armour deck was 1.5 inches thick on the flat and 2.5 inches (64 mm) thick where it sloped down to meet the belt. The protective deck extended fore and aft of the armour deck and ranged from 2.5–3 inches (64–76 mm) in thickness. The change in the machinery allowed Gromoboi to dispense with Rossia's glacis armour that had been necessary to protect the tops of the engine cylinders. The conning tower had walls 12 inches (305 mm) thick, made of Krupp armour. The funnel uptakes and ammunition hoists were protected by 1.5 inches of armour between the lower and middle decks.

== Service ==
Gromoboi was built by the Baltic Works in Saint Petersburg. Construction began on 14 June 1897, although she was not formally laid down until 7 May 1898, and the ship was launched on 8 May 1899. She was transferred to Kronstadt on 24 November 1899 to finish fitting out, but was forced aground by sea ice. She was freed three days later, but needed repairs to her sheathing. She left Liepāja on 10 December 1900 en route to the Far East and stopped briefly at Kiel, where she was inspected by Prince Henry of Prussia, and at Plymouth where the officers visited the Devonport naval base. She represented Russia at the granting of the constitution to Australia, visiting Sydney and Melbourne in April–May 1901, before visiting Nagasaki in July. Gromoboi finally reached Port Arthur on 29 July 1901. She remained in the Pacific until the beginning of the Russo-Japanese War in 1904. During this voyage she was commanded by Karl Petrovich Jessen.

=== Russo-Japanese War ===
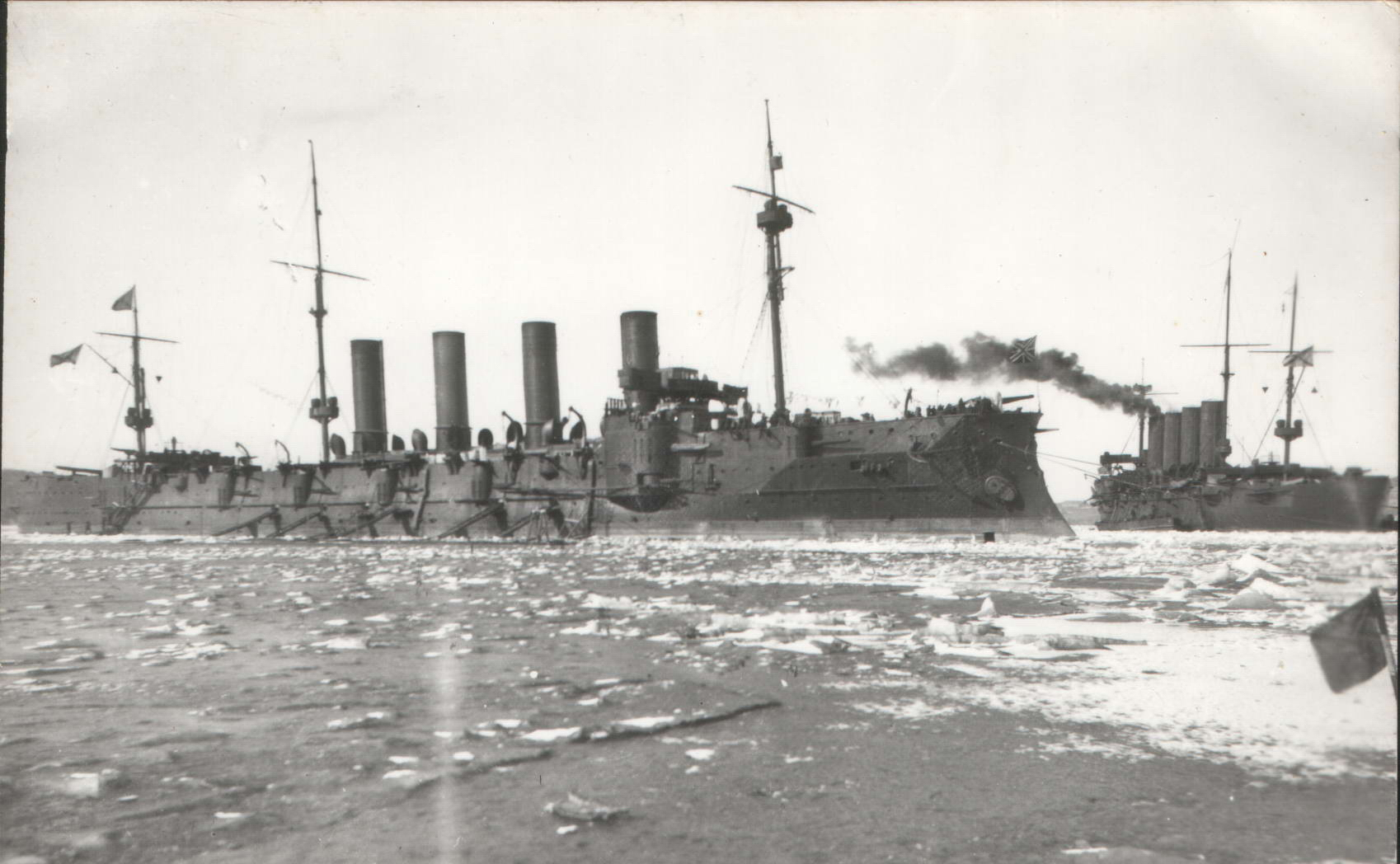
Gromoboi (left) and Rossia in Vladivostok

By this time, Gromoboi was assigned of the Vladivostok Cruiser Squadron under the command of Rear Admiral Karl Jessen. The other ships were the armoured cruisers Rossia and Rurik as well as the protected cruiser Bogatyr. The squadron made a number of sorties against Japanese shipping early in the war. Only one was reasonably successful: on June 15, 1904 the squadron sank Hitachi Maru, which was carrying eighteen 28-centimetre (11 in) siege howitzers and over 1000 troops intended for the siege of Port Arthur.

==== Battle off Ulsan ====
During the war the bulk of the Russian Pacific Fleet was located in Port Arthur where it was blockaded by the Japanese. On 10 August, the ships at Port Arthur attempted breakout to Vladivostok, but were turned back in the Battle of the Yellow Sea. Admiral Jessen was ordered to rendezvous with them, but the order was delayed. His ships had to raise steam, so he did not sortie until the evening of 13 August. Bogatyr had been damaged earlier when she grounded and did not sail with the squadron. By dawn he had reached the island of Tsushima in the Tsushima Strait between Korea and Japan. He turned back for Vladivostok when he failed to see any ships from the Port Arthur squadron. 36 miles (58 km) north of the island he encountered the Japanese squadron commanded by Vice Admiral Kamimura Hikonojō tasked to patrol the Tsushima Strait. The Japanese force had four modern armoured cruisers, Iwate, Izumo, Tokiwa, and Azuma. The two squadrons had passed during the night without spotting one another and each had reversed course around first light. This put the Japanese ships astride the Russian route to Vladivostok.

Jessen turned to the northeast when he spotted the Japanese at 05:00 and they followed suit, albeit on a slightly converging course. Both sides opened fire around 05:23 at a range of 8,500 metres (9,300 yd). The Japanese ships concentrated their fire on Rurik, the rear ship of the Russian formation. She was hit fairly quickly and began to fall astern of the other two ships. Jessen turned southeast in an attempt to open the range, but this blinded the Russian gunners with the rising sun and prevented any of their broadside guns from bearing on the Japanese. About 06:00, Jessen turned 180° to starboard in an attempt to reach the Korean coast and to allow Rurik to rejoin the squadron. Kamimura followed suit around 06:10, but turned to port, which opened the range between the squadrons. Azuma then developed engine problems and the Japanese squadron slowed to conform with her best speed. Firing recommenced at 06:24 and Rurik was hit three times in the stern, flooding her steering compartment; she had to be steered with her engines. Her speed continued to decrease, further exposing her to Japanese fire, and her steering jammed to port around 06:40.

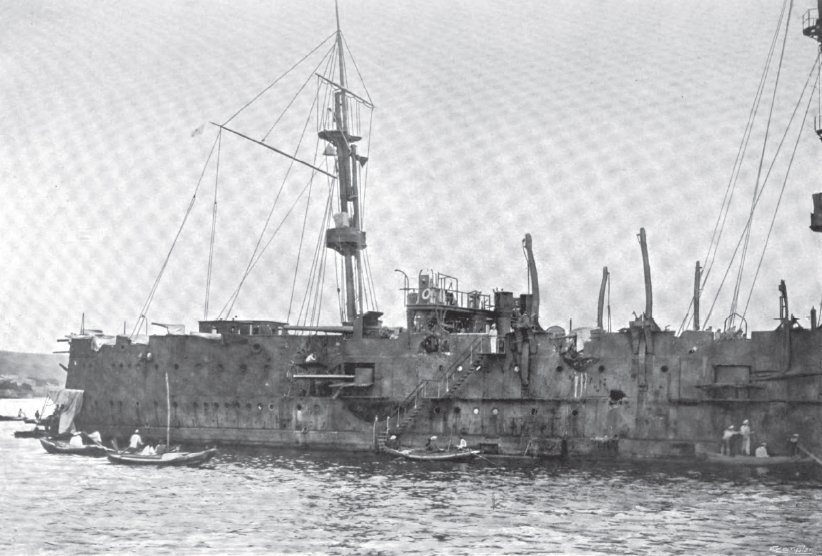
Gromoboi's starboard side after the Battle off Ulsan; note the holes in the ship

Jessen made another 180° turn in an attempt to interpose his two ships between the Japanese and Rurik, but the latter ship suddenly turn to starboard and increased speed and passed between Jessen's ships and the Japanese. Kamimura turned 180° as well so that both squadrons were heading southeast on parallel courses, but Jessen quickly made another 180° turn so that they headed on opposing courses. Iwate was hit around this time, which knocked out three 6-inch and one 12-pounder guns, killing 32 and wounding 43. The Japanese squadron opened the range again when it made a 180° another turn to port. The Russians reversed course for the third time around 07:45 in another attempt to support Rurik although Rossia was on fire herself; her fires were extinguished about twenty minutes later. Kamimura circled Rurik to the south at 08:00 and allowed the other two Russian ships to get to his north and gave them an uncontested route to Vladivostok. Despite this, Jessen turned back once more at 08:15 and ordered Rurik to make her own way back to Vladivostok before turning north at his maximum speed, about 18 knots (33 km/h; 21 mph).

About this time Kamimura's two elderly protected cruisers, Naniwa and Takachiho, were approaching from the south. Their arrival allowed Kamimura to pursue Jessen with all of his armoured cruisers while the two new arrivals dealt with Rurik. They fought a running battle with the Russians for the next hour and a half; scoring enough hits on them to force their speed down to 15 knots (28 km/h; 17 mph). Azuma's engines again broke down during this chase and she was replaced in the line by Tokiwa. The Japanese closed to a minimum of about 5,000 metres (5,500 yd), but Kamimura then opened the range up to 6,500 metres (7,100 yd).

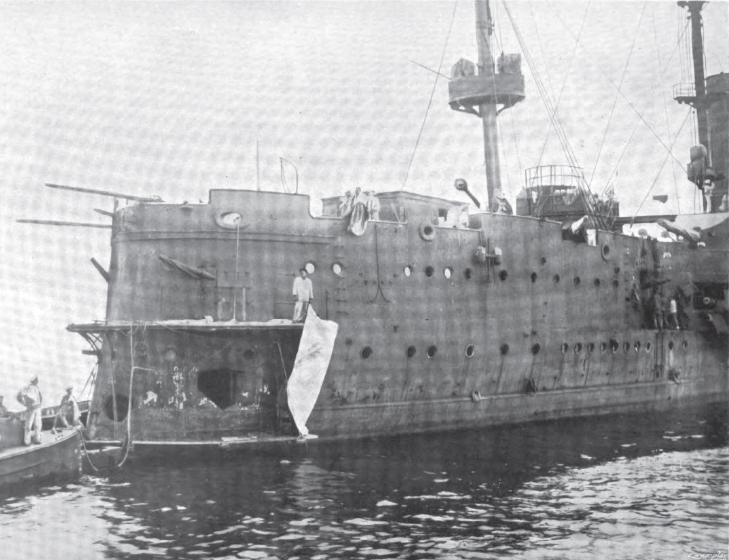
A close-up of Gromoboi's stern after the battle

About 10:00, Kamimura's gunnery officer erroneously informed him that Izumo had expended three-quarters of her ammunition and he turned back after a five-minute rapid-fire barrage. He did not wish to leave the Tsushima Strait unguarded and thought that he could use his remaining ammunition on Rurik. By this time she had been sunk by Naniwa and Takachiho which had closed to 3,000 metres (3,300 yd) of Rurik in order to finish her off. They had radioed Kamimura that she was sunk, but he did not receive the message. Shortly after the Japanese turned back, Gromoboi and Rossia were forced to heave-to to make repairs.

Gromoboi suffered 87 dead and 170 wounded; far more than Rossia's 44 dead and 156 wounded. This was attributable to Rossia's captain's policy of ordering the gun crews for his quick-firing guns on the engaged side to lie down and those on the unengaged side to go below, in contrast to the Gromoboi keeping her light guns manned at all times. Gromoboi was hit fifteen times on the starboard side of her hull and seven times on her port side, plus other hits in her funnels, boats and decks. She also suffered a fire caused by the ignition of excess propellant charges. Despite this number of hits, she was not badly damaged because her waterline belt was not penetrated. She was repaired within two months by the rudimentary facilities available at Vladivostok.

Immediately following her repairs she ran aground outside Vladivostok on 13 October and was not ready for sea until February 1905. The Russians took this opportunity to reinforce her armament with six more 6-inch guns mounted on her upper deck, protected by lightly armoured casemates. Her armament was rearranged as well with her foremost six-inch guns moved from their casemates to the forecastle and the rearmost six-inch guns moved forward. Room for these changes was made by removing many of her lighter guns; she retained only nineteen 75 mm and two 37 mm guns. She also received several Barr and Stroud rangefinders at this time. While testing her new Telefunken radio equipment on 24 May she struck a mine near her forward boiler room. She was able to return to Vladivostok for repairs, but took no further part in the war.

=== Interwar period ===
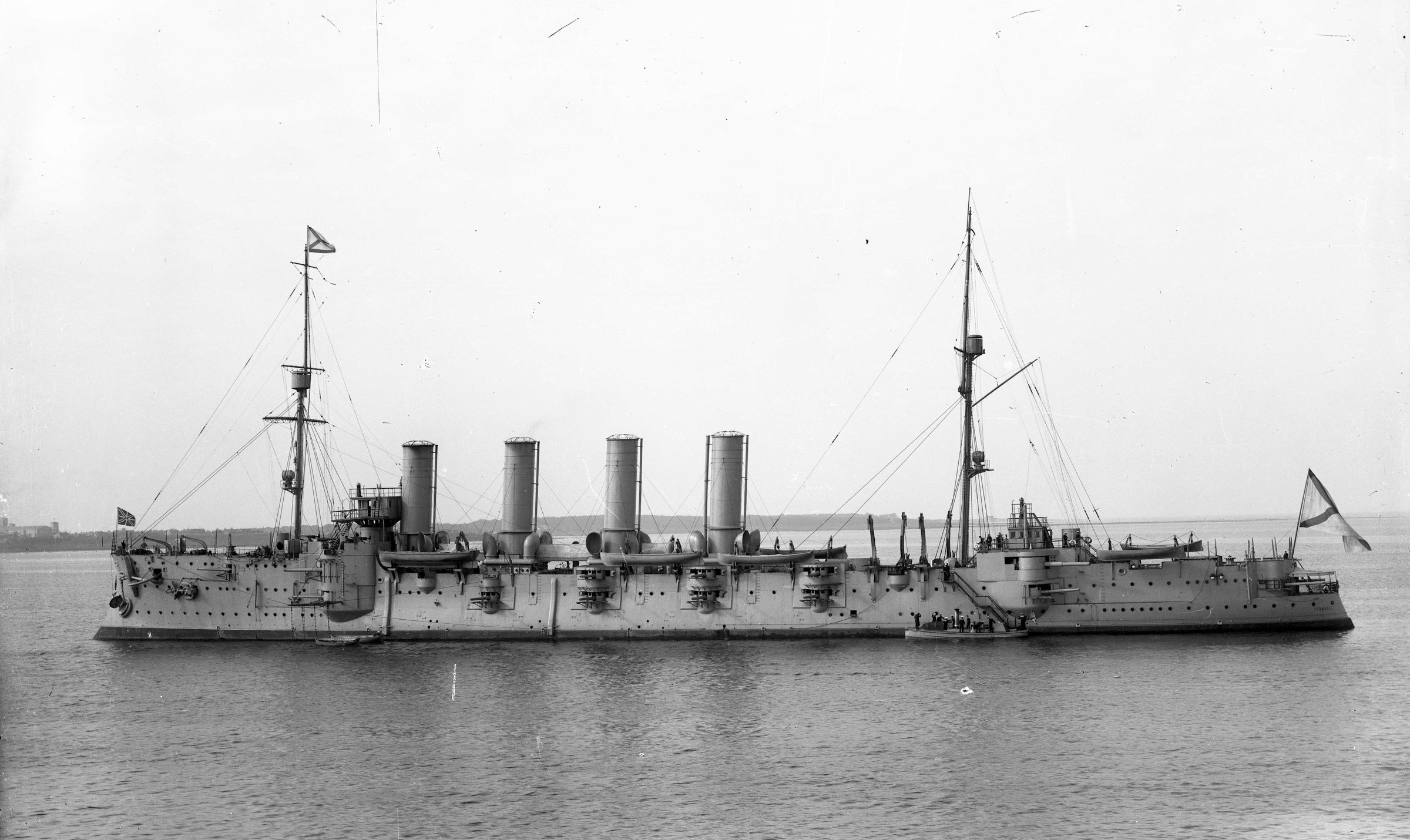
Gromoboi as she appeared after the 1911 refit

Gromoboi returned to the Baltic Fleet after the war. There she was given a lengthy refit that was finished in 1911. Her engines and boilers were reconditioned, and her rear torpedo tubes were removed. The forward 15-inch torpedo tubes were replaced by 18-inch (460 mm) tubes. Her foremast was removed and replaced by her mizzenmast; her mainmast was moved aft in place of the mizzenmast and searchlights were installed on a platform on each mast. A casemate with 3-inch sides and a 1-inch roof was built around the rear eight-inch guns and the rear six-inch guns were moved aft and protected by a casemate with two-inch sides and a .75-inch (19 mm) roof. The thickness of the upper-deck casemates was increased to two inches. Armoured towers fore and aft were built for her rangefinders. Her light armament was reduced to four 75 mm and four 47 mm guns. Engine trials were conducted in late 1910 and were unsatisfactory as they were overheating while delivering only 9,979 indicated horsepower (7,441 kW). The trials were run again on 27 July 1911 and were more satisfactory as they developed 13,337 indicated horsepower (9,945 kW) while Gromoboi reached 18.5 knots (34.3 km/h; 21.3 mph).

=== World War I ===
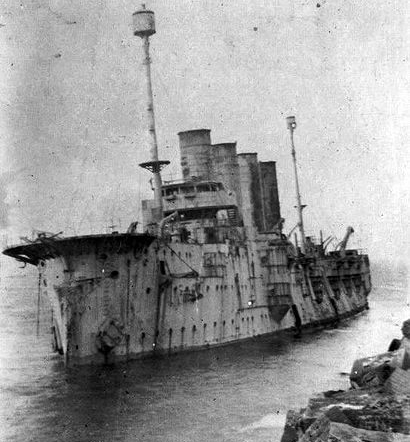
Gromoboi aground near Liepāja

Gromoboi served in the 2nd Cruiser Brigade of the Baltic Fleet during World War I. She was modified to serve as a fast minelayer with a capacity of two hundred mines. She engaged the German battlecruiser SMS Von der Tann at the entrance to the Gulf of Finland on August 10, 1915. Her armament was changed in 1916–1917 as well; she exchanged the six-inch guns on the bow and stern for eight-inch guns. These additions increased her broadside to four eight-inch and eleven six-inch guns. All of her remaining light guns were removed and she received two 2.5-inch and two 47 mm anti-aircraft guns. All of these additions raised her displacement to about 13,200 long tons (13,412 t).

Gromoboi came under control of the Soviet Red Fleet in September 1917. The Treaty of Brest-Litovsk required the Soviets to evacuate their base at Helsinki in March 1918 or have them interned by newly independent Finland even though the Gulf of Finland was still frozen over. Gromoboi sailed to Kronstadt in what became known as the 'Ice Voyage' and was placed into reserve shortly after her arrival.

== Post-World War I ==
In late October 1920, Gromoboi's crew mutinied and took control of the ship off Kronstadt. They killed Gromoboi's commisars and officers and scuttled the ship. Gromoboi was refloated and was sold to a German company for scrapping on 1 July 1922; she ran aground in a storm near Liepāja while under tow to Germany on 30 October and was scrapped in place.
