= Bojan Čiča =

Serbian footballer

Personal information
- Full name: Bojan Čiča
- Date of birth: 10 March 1996 (age 30)
- Place of birth: Subotica, FR Yugoslavia
- Height: 1.91 m (6 ft 3 in)
- Position: Centre-back

Youth career
- Spartak Subotica

Senior career*
Years	Team	Apps	(Gls)
2014–2015	Spartak Subotica	1	(0)
2020–2022	FK Tavankút		
2022	Tornjoš		
2023–	FK Kelebijska Suma		
- * Club domestic league appearances and goals

Bojan Čiča (Serbian Cyrillic: Бојан Чича; born 10 March 1996) is a former Serbian football defender.

== Club career ==
=== Spartak Subotica ===
He made his Jelen SuperLiga debut for Spartak Subotica in an away match versus Radnički Niš on 10 May 2014.
