= Bojan Malinić =

Serbian footballer

Personal information
- Full name: Bojan Malinić
- Date of birth: 8 September 1990 (age 36)
- Place of birth: Zagreb, SR Croatia, SFR Yugoslavia
- Height: 1.90 m (6 ft 3 in)
- Position: Striker

Youth career
- Red Star Belgrade

Senior career*
Years	Team	Apps	(Gls)
2008	Red Star Belgrade	0	(0)
2008–2009	Srem	5	(0)
2009	Beograd	9	(1)
2009–2011	Rapid Wien II	20	(2)
2011–2012	Bihor Oradea	5	(0)
2012–2013	Besa Kavajë	11	(2)
2013–2014	Radnički Kragujevac	5	(0)
2014	Sinđelić Beograd	4	(0)
- * Club domestic league appearances and goals

Bojan Malinić (Serbian Cyrillic: Бојан Малинић; born 8 September 1990) is a Serbian football striker.

== Club career ==
On 4 February 2008, he joined Red Star Belgrade but never played any official match with them, instead he was loaned to FK Srem and FK Beograd to gain experience. He later had two seasons with the Rapid Wien Amateure.
