= Bojan Rašić =

Serbian politician

Bojan Rašić (Serbian Cyrillic: Бојан Рашић; born 1985) is a politician in Serbia. He has served in the Assembly of Vojvodina since 2020 as a member of the Serbian Progressive Party.

== Private career ==
Rašić holds a Bachelor of Science degree in economics. He lives in Inđija.

== Politician ==
The Progressive Party won a majority victory in Inđija in the 2016 Serbian local elections. Rašić was not a candidate, but he was subsequently appointed to the municipal council (i.e., the executive branch of the municipal government) and served in this role for the next four years.

He received the twenty-seventh position on the Progressive Party's Aleksandar Vučić — For Our Children list in the 2020 provincial election and was elected when the list won a majority victory with seventy-six out of 120 mandates. He is now a member of the assembly committee on budget and finance and the committee on co-operation with the national assembly committees in exercise of the competences of the province.
