= Bojan Gočanin =

Serbian footballer

Personal information
- Full name: Bojan Gočanin
- Date of birth: 11 October 1997 (age 29)
- Place of birth: Vrnjačka Banja, FR Yugoslavia
- Height: 1.79 m (5 ft 10 in)
- Position: Defensive midfielder

Team information
- Current team: Omladinac Novo Selo

Youth career
- –2014: Radnički Kragujevac
- 2015: BSK Borča
- 2015: OFK Beograd
- 2016: Metalac Gornji Milanovac

Senior career*
Years	Team	Apps	(Gls)
2016–2021	Metalac Gornji Milanovac	60	(0)
2016	→ Karađorđe Topola (loan)		
2021	→ Sloga Kraljevo (loan)	15	(2)
2021-2022	Takovo		
2023	Real Podunavci		
2023-	Omladinac NS		

International career
2013	Serbia U17		
- * Club domestic league appearances and goals as of 13:05, 14 February 2021 (UTC)

Bojan Gočanin (Serbian Cyrillic: Бојан Гочанин; born 11 October 1997) is a Serbian footballer who plays for Omladinac Novo Selo. He had played for Sloga Kraljevo on loan from Metalac Gornji Milanovac.

== Club career ==
Born in Vrnjačka Banja, Bojan's surname originating from the Goč mountain. He started his career with Radnički Kragujevac as a centre-back. He was also called into Serbia national under-17 football team, and was nominated for the best youth sportsmen of Kragujevac ending of 2013. Later he played with youth teams of BSK Borča and OFK Beograd.

=== Metalac Gornji Milanovac ===
Gočanin joined Metalac Gornji Milanovac at the beginning of 2016, where he ended his youth career. He passed the summer pre-season and started 2016–17 Serbian SuperLiga with te first team. He made his senior debut for the club in opening match of the season against Borac Čačak, played on 23 July 2016, replacing Nemanja Mladenović in the 54th minute of the game.

== Career statistics ==
=== Club ===
As of 26 December 2016

Club	Season	League			Cup		Continental		Other		Total	
Club	Season	Division	Apps	Goals	Apps	Goals	Apps	Goals	Apps	Goals	Apps	Goals
Metalac	2015–16	SuperLiga	0	0	—		—		—		0	0
Metalac	2016–17	SuperLiga	6	0	0	0	—		—		6	0
Metalac	Total		6	0	0	0	—		—		6	0
