= Bojan Razpet =

- Born: January 22, 1960 (age 65); Jesenice, Yugoslavia
- Height: 5 ft 11 in (180 cm)
- Weight: 176 lb (80 kg; 12 st 8 lb)
- Position: Forward
- Played for: HK Jesenice
- National team: Yugoslavia
- NHL draft: Undrafted

Bojan Razpet (born January 22, 1960) is a former Yugoslav ice hockey player. He played for the Yugoslavia men's national ice hockey team at the 1984 Winter Olympics in Sarajevo.
