= Solveig Sørbø =

Norwegian opera composer

- Born: Oslo
- Notable work: Love Theme, Heroin Chic (opera), MusicLab (research project)
- Style: Classical, pop
- Children: 3
- Father: Gunnar Hasle
- Website: solveigsorbo.com

Solveig Sørbø (born 1986) is a Norwegian composer, music producer, performing artist and former librarian and radio journalist.

== Music ==
Solveig Sørbø scored the music for the 2021 documentary film Hans pluss Liv by Mari Bakke Riise. Her piece Love Theme is inspired by the story and has been released in several versions including ones featuring Catharina Chen and Ayumi Tanaka. In january 2024 The Norwegian Radio Orchestra performed the piece orchestrated by Henrik Skram during Meloditimen in NRK's Grand Studio. Sørbø also writes chamber music and opera. Fragments from her opera Heroin Chic which she wrote with author and librettist Maria Kjos Fonn was performed in the Fartein Valen hall of Stavanger konserthus in 2022, and in 2024 as part of the four hundredth anniversary of the Kvadraturen. The full-length world premiere took place as an opera in concert in Iași on 25 February 2025 to much critical acclaim with Susanna Wolff and Sofia Neacșu in the main roles as the adult and child "Elise" respectively. Sørbø has also released popular music with her band Pysj.

== Academic work ==
As a librarian at University of Oslo Library Sørbø coinitiated the research concept MusicLab together with professor of music technology Alexander Refsum Jensenius at RITMO. In MusicLab each event is both a concert and an instance for data collection and both music, data and research results are shared openly. MusicLab has collaborated with Danish String Quartet, Abels tårn and The Norwegian Radio Orchestra and research output has been published in Music & Science. The collaboration with Danish String Quartet about musical absorption was awarded the prize for "event of the year" by DR.

== Radio journalism ==
In 2022–2023 Sørbø worked as a radio journalist in NRK. She hosted the shows Musikkfrokost, Sommerfrokost, God formiddag and Levende musikk, and was a researcher and reporter for Arena, Drivkraft and Studio 2. In 2020–2021 Sørbø created the fm radio show and podcast Solveigs Speisa Musikk at RadiOrakel. The show, which received funding from Medietilsynet, focussed on underground music and musicology, and Norsk Lokalradioforbund nominated Sørbø for Prix Radio as host of the year i both musical- and verbal radio. Sørbø has freelanced for ULTIMA Oslo Contemporary Music Festival as a hostess and sound editor, and produced a radio portrait of Raven Chacon which was broadcast on Stegi radio.

== Family ==
Sørbø is the daughter of physician and zoologist Gunnar Hasle, sister of opera singer Susanna Wolff and actress and singer in Klossmajor Maja Sørbø, and mother of memory athlete and Norwegian champion of Pi memorization Penelope Sørbø.
