= Bojan Milovanović =

Serbian politician and administrator

Bojan Milovanović (Serbian Cyrillic: Бојан Миловановић; born 11 July 1960) is a Serbian politician and administrator. He was the mayor of Raška from 2000 to 2008 and also served in the National Assembly of Serbia from 2007 to 2008. Milovanović is a member of the Socialist Party of Serbia (Socijalistička partija Srbije, SPS).

== Private career ==
Milovanović is a specialist doctor in emergency medicine.

== Politician ==
=== Mayor of Raška ===
Milovanović was the president of the Socialist Party's municipal committee in Raška at the time of the 2000 Serbian local elections. The party won a majority victory in the municipality; this occurred at the same time as the defeat of SPS leader Slobodan Milošević in the 2000 Yugoslavian presidential election, an event that led to large-scale changes in Serbia's political culture. Daily protests took place in Raška after the municipal vote due to suspicions of electoral fraud. One of the protestors' demands was for control of TV Most, the municipality's television station, which was officially owned by the SPS. Milovanović negotiated an agreement with local opposition leaders, which allowed for a transition in the station's leadership and changes in its programming.

Despite the controversy surrounding the election, the municipal results were allowed to stand. Milovanović, who had been elected as a SPS member, was chosen as president of the assembly, a position that was at the time equivalent to mayor. While the Socialists held a majority of seats, Milovanović brought the opposition Democratic Party (Demokratska stranka, DS) into government, and its leaders held some important administrative positions. He faced challenges maintaining support for the coalition within his own party; he threatened to resign in 2002, although he ultimately did not do so.

Serbia briefly introduced the direct election of mayors in the 2004 local elections, and Milovanović was re-elected as mayor of Raška in the second round of voting.

During his tenure as mayor, Milovanović sought investors to complete the hotel and beautify the spa in Jošanička Banja, both of which were in a state of disrepair. In November 2007, following a decision by the local assembly, he named Russian president Vladimir Putin as an honorary citizen of Raška.

=== Parliamentarian ===
Milovanović appeared in the 136th position on the SPS's electoral list in the 2007 Serbian parliamentary election. The list won sixteen mandates, and he was included in his party's assembly delegation. (From 2000 to 2011, mandates in Serbian parliamentary elections were awarded to sponsoring parties or coalitions rather than individual candidates, and it was common practice for the mandates to be distributed out of numerical order. Milovanović's position on the list – which was in any event mostly alphabetical – had not specific bearing on his chances of election.) After the election, the DS, the Democratic Party of Serbia (Demokratska stranka Srbije, DSS), and G17 Plus formed an unstable coalition government, and the SPS served in opposition. Milovanović chaired the assembly's committee for poverty reduction and was a member of its health and family committee.

The DS–DSS alliance broke down in early 2008, and a new parliamentary election was held in May of that year. Milovanović once again appeared on the SPS's list, which won twenty seats. On this occasion, he was not given a mandate.

Serbia abandoned the direct election of mayors after 2004. Milovanović appeared in the second position on the SPS's list in the 2008 local elections in Raška. The list won nine mandates, finishing in second place; he did not take a seat, and his term as mayor came to an end.

=== Since 2008 ===
Serbia's electoral system was reformed in 2011, such that assembly mandates were awarded in numerical order to candidates on successful lists. Milovanović led the SPS's list for the Raška municipal assembly in the 2012, 2016, and 2020 local elections and was re-elected each time. He resigned his seat in the assembly on 1 November 2021.

Milovanović appeared in the 115th position on the SPS's list in the 2014 Serbian parliamentary election and the ninety-eighth position in the 2016 election. The lists won forty-four and twenty-nine seats, respectively, and he was not re-elected on either occasion.

In 2009, Milovanović was appointed as director of the Kopaonik national park. He continues to hold this position as of 2022.

== Electoral record ==
=== Municipal (Raška) ===
2004 Municipality of Raška local election: Mayor of Raška (second round results)
Candidate	Party	Votes	%
Bojan Milovanović	Socialist Party of Serbia	5,264	56.11
Milan Pejčinović	Strength of Serbia Movement	4,118	43.89
Total		9,382	100.00
