= Bojan Simić =

Serbian footballer

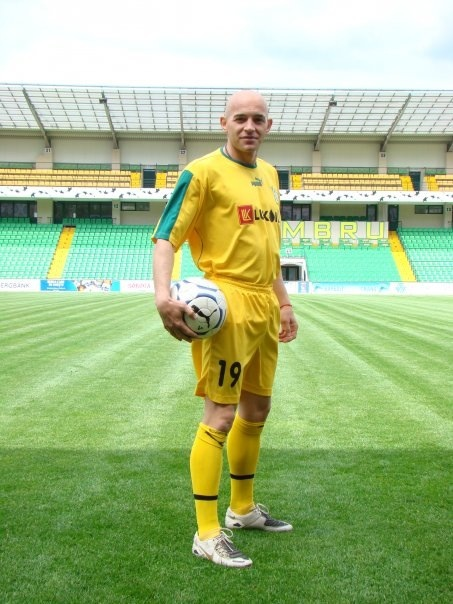
- Bojan Simić in 2014

Personal information
- Full name: Bojan Simić
- Date of birth: 26 September 1976 (age 50)
- Place of birth: Leskovac, SFR Yugoslavia
- Height: 1.74 m (5 ft 9 in)
- Position: Defender

Senior career*
Years	Team	Apps	(Gls)
1999–2001	Hajduk Beograd	30	(6)
2001–2003	Budućnost Banatski Dvor	17	(0)
2003	→ Metalac Gornji Milanovac (loan)	13	(0)
2003–2004	Leotar	32	(3)
2004–2005	Hajduk Beograd	12	(0)
2005	Irtysh Pavlodar	40	(6)
2006	Sevojno	15	(0)
2006–2007	Mladost Lučani	27	(1)
2007–2009	Zimbru Chișinău	65	(5)
2009–2011	Mladi Radnik	28	(0)
Total		279	(21)
- * Club domestic league appearances and goals as of December 6, 2009

Bojan Simić (Serbian Cyrillic: Бојан Симић; born 26 September 1976) is a Serbian retired footballer.

Previously he has played with Serbian clubs FK Hajduk Beograd, FK Budućnost Banatski Dvor, FK Metalac Gornji Milanovac, FK Sevojno and FK Mladost Lučani, and also abroad with Bosnian FK Leotar, Kazakh FC Irtysh Pavlodar and Moldavian FC Zimbru Chișinău.
