= Bojana (given name) =

- Pronunciation: Serbo-Croatian: [bǒjana]
- Gender: female

Origin
- Language: Slavic
- Origin: boj "battle"
- Derivation: boj- (root) + an (suffix) + a (suffix)

Bojana (Slovenian: Bojana; Macedonian and Serbian Cyrillic: Бојана; Russian and Bulgarian Cyrillic: Бояна; transcribed Boyana) is a Slavic given name. It is the feminine version of name Bojan derived from the Slavic noun boj "battle". The name is mainly used within the area of Southeastern Europe.

People named Bojana:

- Bojana Bobusic, an Australian tennis player
- Bojana Drča, a Serbian volleyball player
- Bojana Janković, a Serbian basketball player
- Bojana Jovanovski, a Serbian tennis player
- Bojana Milenković, a Serbian volleyball player
- Bojana Milošević, a Serbian basketball player
- Bojana Novakovic, a Serbian-Australian actress
- Bojana Ordinačev, a Serbian actress
- Bojana Popović, a Montenegrin handballer
- Bojana Radulović, a Yugoslav and Hungarian handballer
- Bojana Sentaler, a Serbian-Canadian fashion designer
- Bojana Stamenov, a Serbian singer and musician
- Bojana Todorović, a Serbian volleyball player
- Bojana Vulić, a Serbian basketball player
