= Boyan Botevo =

- Village
- Location within Bulgaria
- Coordinates: 41°50′N 25°18′E
- Country: Bulgaria
- Province: Haskovo Province
- Municipality: Mineralni bani

Population (2016)
  - Total: ▼679
- Time zone: UTC+2 (EET)
  - Summer (DST): UTC+3 (EEST)

Boyan Botevo is a village in the municipality of Mineralni bani, in Haskovo Province, in southern Bulgaria.

As of 31 December 2016 the village of Boyan Botevo has 679 inhabitants. The village is almost entirely inhabited by ethnic Turks.
