= Bojan Mišić =

Serbian footballer

Personal information
- Date of birth: 29 September 1978 (age 48)
- Place of birth: Požarevac, SFR Yugoslavia
- Height: 1.89 m (6 ft 2 1/2 in)
- Position: Goalkeeper

Senior career*
| Years | Team | Apps | (Gls) |
| 2001–2006 | Mladi Radnik | 150 | (0) |
| 2006–2008 | Mladost Lučani | 56 | (0) |
| 2008 | Sportakademklub Moscow | 8 | (0) |
| 2009 | Kolubara | 15 | (0) |
| 2009 | Khimki | 0 | (0) |
| 2010–2011 | Mladi Radnik | 16 | (0) |
| 2011 | Jasenica 1911 | 13 | (0) |
| 2012 | Šapine | ? | (0) |
| 2012–2013 | Mladi Radnik | 28 | (0) |
| 2012–2013 | Radnički Svilajnac | 14 | (0) |
| 2013 | Dinamo Pančevo | 15 | (0) |
| 2014–2016 | Sloga Petrovac na Mlavi | 14 | (0) |
| 2016–2017 | Šapine | | |
| 2017 | Jedinstvo Užice | | |
- * Club domestic league appearances and goals

Bojan Mišić (Serbian Cyrillic: Бојан Мишић; born 29 September 1978) is a Serbian retired football goalkeeper.

== Career ==
Mišić signed for Russian Premier League side FC Khimki on 14 August 2009 until the end of the season. He played with FK Mladost Lučani and FK Mladi Radnik in the Serbian SuperLiga.
