= Bojan Ljubevski =

Macedonian handball player

Personal information
- Nationality: Macedonian
- Born: 30 November 1996 (age 29) Skopje, Macedonia
- Height: 1.83 m (6 ft 0 in)

Sport
- Sport: Handball
- Position: Centre Back
- Current club: RK Metalurg II
- Number: 39

Youth career
- Years: Team
- –: (North Macedonia) RK Tineks Prolet

Senior clubs
- Years: Team
- 2015–2018: (North Macedonia) RK Tineks Prolet
- 2017–2018: → (North Macedonia) RK Partizan Gevgelija
- 2018–2019: (North Macedonia) RK Rabotnički
- 2019–: (North Macedonia) RK Metalurg II

Bojan Ljubevski (Macedonian: Бојан Љубевски) (born 30 November 1996) is a Macedonian handball player who plays for RK Metalurg II.
