= Bojan Šober =

Bojan Šober (born 1957 in Rijeka, Croatia) is a bass-baritone opera singer and manager. He has also served as a director of the Lions Clubs International.

== Education ==
He graduated high school in his home town and became an English language professor at the Teachers Training College, University of Rijeka. Simultaneously, he studied singing in Italy and in 1982 graduated (BA) from a specialty course at Teatro alla Scala, Milan (Centro di Perfezionamento per Artisti Lirici). He acquired his MA at the Music Academy "Ino Mirković" in Lovran.

== Career ==
During 35 years of his solo singer career, he has performed at all the opera stages of former Yugoslavia as well as at many summer music festivals there. His many performances abroad include two consecutive seasons at the Teatro alla Scala in Milan, but in all the important theaters in Europe (Turin, Trieste, Brno, Kiev, Moscow, Geneva, Parma...) and overseas: Canada, the United States, Japan, Israel, Australia. He has also appeared on the concert stage, performing oratorios, cantatas and sacred music.

In 1998, he recorded a CD with the Moscow Great Hall Symphony Orchestra, directed by conductor Leonid Nikolayev and in 2000, he recorded with the Orchestra Sinfonica di Sanremo, conducted by Fabiano Monica. In 2004 he recorded a combination DVD and CD of "The Barber of Seville" for Portuguese TV with José Ferreira Lobo and the Orchestra du Nord.

In 1997 he debuted as an opera stage director with the "Barber of Seville" at the National Opera House of Rijeka. His other productions include Puccini's "Madama Butterfly" in Jefferson, Louisiana, US, in 1999; and "La Traviata" in Mississauga (Canada) in 2002.

1996-1999 Sober was artistic director of the National Opera house Ivan pl. Zajc in Rijeka 1997-1998 was a general manager of the National Theater in Rijeka as well. As of 2009, he was the general manager of the Festival Opatija Opera House.

== Awards and prizes ==
- "A.T.A. Laboratorio Lirico Sperimentale" (Alessandria, Italy) for his performance of Verdi's Falstaff.
- Second prize "G.B. Viotti" at the International opera singer's contest in Vercelli, Italy, 1982;
- "Croatian Theater Prize" for the main male role in "The Barber of Seville" in 1998;
- "Croatian Presidential Medal of Merit" for contributions to Croatian culture 1998;
- Annual Award of the City of Rijeka in 2004;
- "Milka Trnina Award," the highest artistic prize in Croatia.
- Cavaliere (Knight of the Order of the Star of Italian Solidarity), conferred on him by Italian president Giorgio Napolitano on April 22, 2008, for promoting Italian culture around the world.

== Lions Clubs International ==
Šober was elected to serve a two-year term as a director of The International Association of Lions Clubs at the association's 91st International Convention, held in Bangkok, Thailand, June 23–27, 2008.

A member of the Rijeka Lions Club and a Lion since 1994, he has held many offices within the association. He also serves as a "Coordinating Lion" for Bosnia and Herzegovina. In addition, he has received numerous awards, including the Ambassador of Good Will Award, the highest honor the association grants its members. He is also a Progressive Melvin Jones Fellow.

== Sources ==
- International Association of Lions Clubs, Biography: Bojan Sober
- Maljavac, Marino, "Rekordna posjećenost koncerata na Ljetnoj", Novi List, 18 August 2009
- Ožegović, Nina (24 February 2004). "Pravi bračni par u ulogama supružnika u preljubu i svađi" [An actual couple playing spouses in adultery and fight] (in Croatian). Nacional. Archived from the original on 24 March 2012.
- Presidenza della Repubblica Italiana, Sober, Maestro Bojan - Cavaliere dell'Ordine della Stella della solidarietà italiana
