= Bojan Stamenković =

Serbian footballer

Personal information
- Full name: Bojan Stamenković
- Date of birth: 14 November 1981 (age 44)
- Place of birth: Leskovac, SFR Yugoslavia
- Height: 1.87 m (6 ft 1 1/2 in)
- Position: Midfielder

Senior career*
| Years | Team | Apps | (Gls) |
| 2001–2003 | Radnički Niš | 55 | (5) |
| 2003 | Zemun | 11 | (0) |
| 2004–2005 | Dubočica | | |
| 2005–2006 | Radnički Kragujevac | 1 | (0) |
| 2006 | → Napredak Kruševac (loan) | 12 | (4) |
| 2006–2010 | Napredak Kruševac | 51 | (2) |
| 2009–2010 | → Dinamo Vranje (loan) | 22 | (5) |
| 2010–2011 | Banat Zrenjanin | 21 | (1) |
| 2011–2012 | Radnički Niš | 17 | (3) |
| 2012 | Timok | 17 | (0) |
| 2013 | Sileks | 7 | (2) |
| 2013–2014 | Moravac Mrštane | | |
| 2014-2015 | Radnički Pirot | | |
| 2015-2016 | Radan Lebane | | |
| 2016-2017 | Dubočica | | |
- * Club domestic league appearances and goals

Bojan Stamenković (Serbian Cyrillic: Бојан Стаменковић; born 14 November 1981) is a Serbian football midfielder who last played for FK Dubočica before retiring in 2017.
