= Bojan Počkar =

Slovenian mountain climber

- Born: 17 March 1963; Prem, Ilirska Bistrica, Yugoslavia
- Died: 4 October 1996 (aged 33); Kabru, Nepal
- Occupation: Mountain climber
- Years active: 1983–1996

Bojan Počkar (17 March 1963 – 4 October 1996) was a Slovenian mountain climber who died on Kabru Mountain in October 1996.

He became interested in climbing in an elementary school named after Dragotin Kette in his home town. He continued his studies later in Postojna and Ljubljana, where he eventually graduated in forestry in 1987, Five years later, he became the youngest forester with magister degree in Slovenia

== Early life and career ==
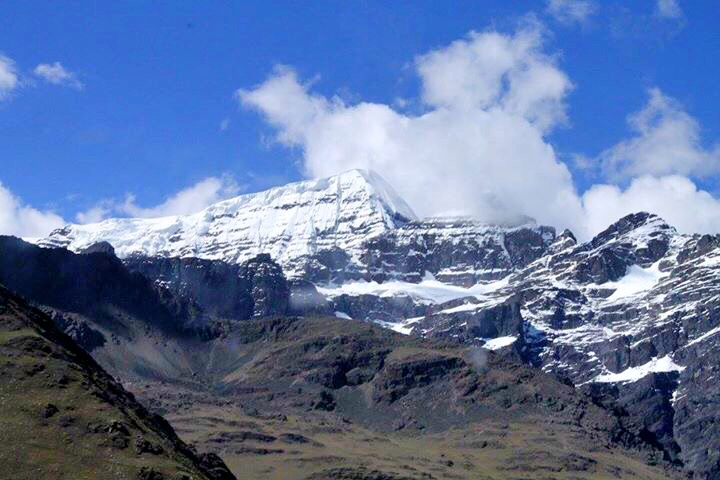
Mount Mururata

In 1983, he started with Alpine climbing, mostly in Julian Alps, where, in 1986, he named a new route on Rombon peak (2,207 metres (7,241 ft)) after his schoolmate Sam Trošt, who died two years before during the ascent of Krn (2,244 metres (7,362 ft)) in the same southwestern part of the Julian Alps. During those two years, Počkar made 125 expeditions that gave him the experience and skills to search for new challenges, outside the Alps. In 1987, he climbed new routes in Bolivia with Bojan Pograjc, Jernej Stritih and Filip Bertoncelj on the south face of Mururata (5,871 metres (19,262 ft)) in the Cordillera Real mountain range. The Alpine Association of Slovenia wrote about the expedition in 1987.

In 1988, Bojan received the Sportsman of the Year Award in Ilirska Bistrica, for two new routes in Canadian Rockies between 25 June, until 4 August. 1988, that he climbed with Bojan Pograjc and Nejc Skov. The first was on the south face of Yamnuska (2240 m, 7349 ft), 400-meter high rock face near Calgary, and the second was the right side of the 1350-meter high north side of Mount Temple (3544 m, 11627 ft). He returned to Canada in 1990 with Simona Škarja, where they climbed a new route on the north face of Mount Robson (3954 m, 12972 ft) and named it Slovenian route. That was also the first female climb on the north face of the mountain.

== Early expeditions ==
His Himalayan expeditions unfortunately offered a bit less success. His first trip there was with Vanja Furlan in October 1989, where they unsuccessfully attempted a climb on north wall of Ama Dablam (6812 m, 22349 ft). On 15 July 1990, Bojan and Vanja climbed a new route on Monte Rosa (4634 m, 15203 ft) in Pennine Alps and named it Gringo. After that Bojan and Vanja were first unsuccessful on Kumbhakarna (7710 m, 25300 ft) in 1991 and in April 1992, Bojan returned with Vanja Furlan, and unsuccessfully attempted to climb east side of the same mountain. They started the mission on 8 April. and reached the base camp on 28 April. After that they acclimatized on Kabru Mountain, where Bojan would not climb for the last time. On 12 May, they started the climb on Kumbhakarna and after spending 96 hours in the mountain had to quit because of Počkar's exhaustion and Furlan's frostbites. Nevertheless, even not being able to reach the peak of Kumbhakarna, they climbed 1600-metres high east wall of the mountain and named it Slovenian route. Slovenian climber and numerous Piolet d'Or award winner Marko Prezelj described the attempt.

In April 1994 Bojan Počkar, Tadej Golob and Štefan Milnarič attempted a climb on Hiunchuli (6441 m, 21132 ft), however due to the weather conditions and difficult route, had to abort the mission.

== Death and legacy ==
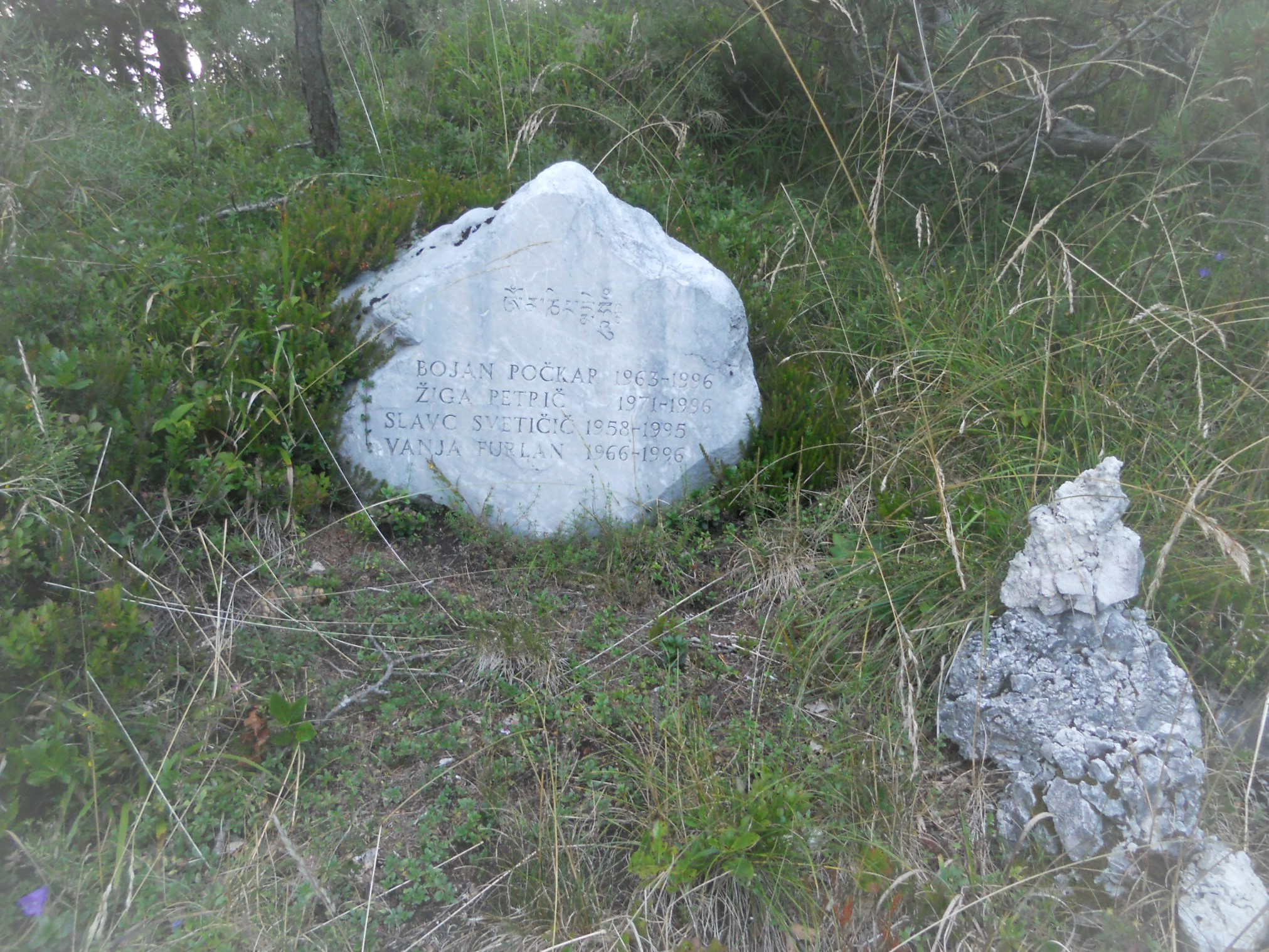
Memorial for Bojan Počkar, Žiga Petrič, Vanja Furlan and Miroslav Svetičič under the Mangart Mountain

In 1995 Bojan started climbing with his new partner Žiga Petrič, who was 23 years old at the time and considered as one of the brightest prospects in European alpinism. Together they climbed new routes in the Alps. First in Breithorn (4164 m, 13661 ft) on 5 August, Nadelhorn (4327 m, 14196 ft) on 28 November 1995, and Weisshorn (4506 m, 14783 ft) in June 1996. In between Počkar and Petrič had a successful trip to the Himalayas. On 7 October 1995, they climbed a new route on Singuchuli (6501 m, 21329 ft) and named it the Perun route after an ancient Slavic God of thunder and lightning. An enthusiastic Dutch climber, William van Meegdenburg, wrote about the Perun route.

A year later Počkar and Petrič returned to Himalayas. This time they were accompanied by a doctor, Anja Perdan, who was recommended to the team by Tone Škarja, a key figure in the Slovenian Himalayan success story. Žiga Petrič, Bojan Počkar and dr. Anja Perdan arrived at the base camp at the East Kumbhakarna Mountain or Jannu (7710 m, 25,300 ft), important western outlier of the world's third highest peak Kangchenjunga (8586 m, 28,169 ft), on 27 September 1996. Kangchenjunga was considered the highest mountain until 1852 when recalculations were made and resulted in K2 (8586 metres (28,169 ft) and Mt. Everest (8,848 m, 29,029 ft) topping it, however it remained one of the toughest tests and deadliest peaks for Alpine climbers until this day. During the typical acclimatisation climb on Kabru Mountain, which has a direct view on the east side of Kangchenjunga Žiga and Bojan went missing after failing to report to their base camp. On 17 October, the camp was dismissed and they were pronounced dead with the cause being stated as an avalanche on the night between 4 and 5 October 1996. Bojan was 33 years old.
