= 203 mm 45 caliber Pattern 1892 =

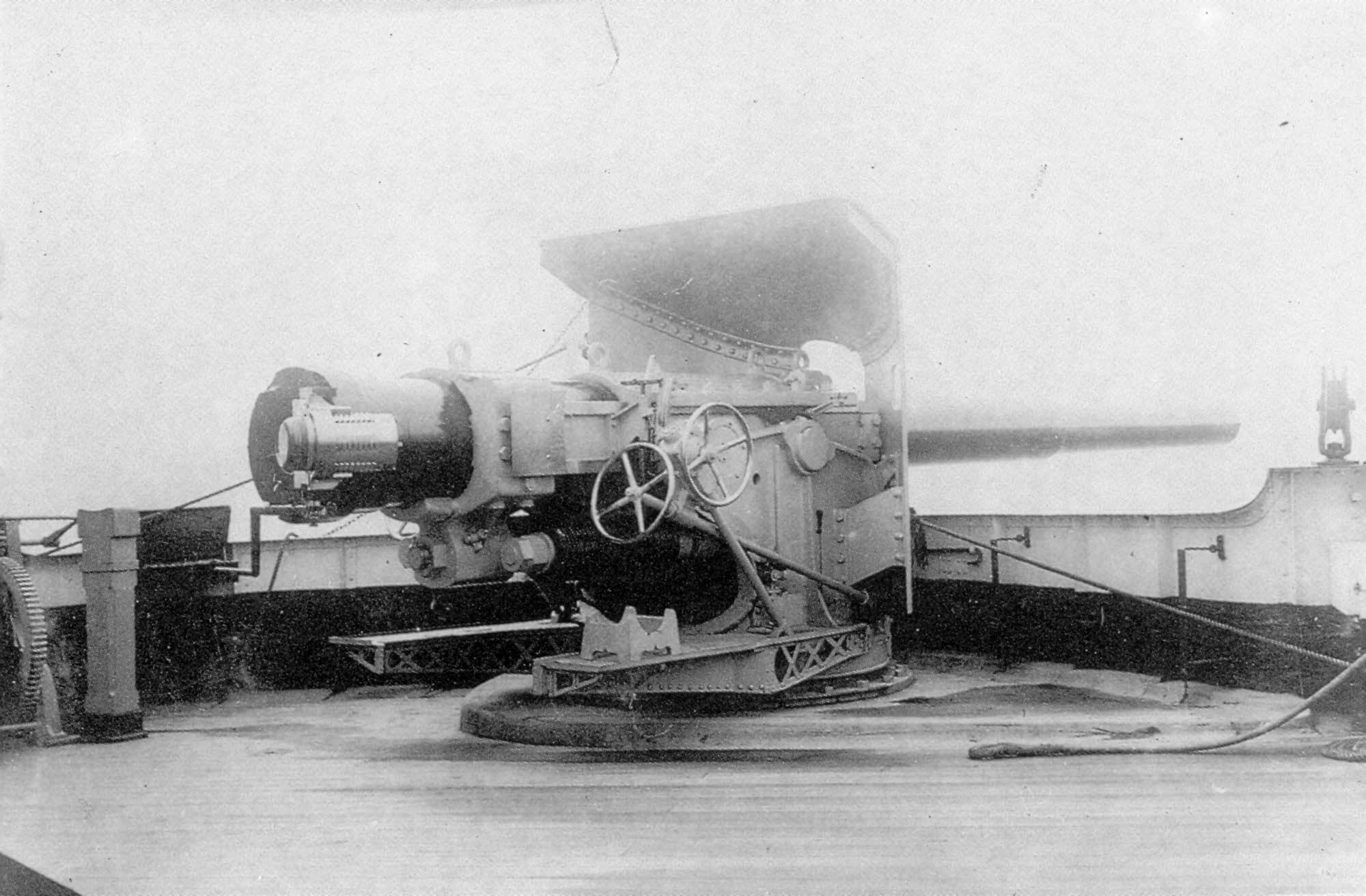
- Aft sponson 203 mm gun aboard the cruiser Rossia
- Type: Naval gun Coastal artillery Railway artillery
- Place of origin: Russian Empire

Service history
- In service: 1895–1920's
- Used by: Russian Empir; Soviet Union; Finland
- Wars: Russo-Japanese War; World War I Russian Civil War; Winter War; Continuation War

Production history
- Designed: 1892
- Produced: 1895

Specifications
- Mass: 12.1 t (13.3 short tons)
- Length: 9.1 m (29 ft 10 in)
- Barrel length: 7.5 m (24 ft 7 in)
- Shell: Separate loading bagged charge and projectile
- Shell weight: 87.8 kg (194 lb)
- Caliber: 203 mm (8.0 in) 45 caliber
- Elevation: -5° to +18°
- Traverse: -135° to +135°
- Muzzle velocity: 744–899 m/s (2,440–2,950 ft/s)
- Maximum firing range: 16 km (9.9 mi) at +18°

The 203 mm 45 caliber Pattern 1892 was a Russian naval gun developed in the years before the Russo-Japanese War that armed a variety of warships of the Imperial Russian Navy during the Russo-Japanese War and World War I. Guns salvaged from scrapped ships found a second life as coastal artillery.

== History ==
=== Russian/Soviet ===
The 203 mm 45 caliber was designed in 1892 and soon went into production. The initial order was for twenty guns and by May 1901 thirteen had been completed. Production was restarted in 1915 to replace worn out guns and nine more were delivered. A follow-up order for seventeen to be completed in 1917-18 was placed, but not completed due to the October Revolution of 1917. In addition to the guns used aboard ships eight were installed in two coastal artillery batteries of four guns each on the islands of Nargen and Mäkiluoto.

It is believed none were in service during World War II.

=== Finland ===
Only three of these guns ever saw use with Finnish military, but they still succeeded seeing combat use in coastal artillery batteries of Pukkio and Mäkiluoto during World War II.

== Naval use ==
The 203 mm 45 caliber Pattern 1892 guns armed armored cruisers, gunboats and pre-dreadnought battleships of the Imperial Russian Navy built or refit between 1892 and 1916.

=== Armored cruisers ===
- Bayan-class - This class of four ships primary armament consisted of two 203 mm 45 caliber guns, in single turrets fore and aft.
- Rurik-class - The primary armament of Gromoboi consisted of four 203 mm 45 caliber guns, in single mounts. Two were in casemates fore and two casemates aft for Gromoboi. The primary armament of Rossia consisted of four 203 mm 45 caliber guns, in single mounts. Two were in casemates fore and two were on sponsons aft for Rossia.

=== Gunboats ===
- Khrabryy - The primary armament of this ship consisted of two, shielded, single mount, 203 mm 45 caliber guns, in forward sponsons.

=== Pre-dreadnought battleships ===
- Imperator Aleksandr II - This ships secondary armament consisted of five, 203 mm 45 caliber guns, in single mounts, after a 1904 refit.

== Ammunition ==
Ammunition was of separate loading type with a bagged charge and projectile. The charge weighed 29–32 kg (64–71 lb).

The gun was able to fire:

- Armor Piercing - 87.8 kg (194 lb)
- Common - 106.9 kg (236 lb)
- High Explosive - 87.8 kg (194 lb)
- SAP - 106.9 kg (236 lb)
- Shrapnel - 116.8 kg (257 lb)

== Photo gallery ==
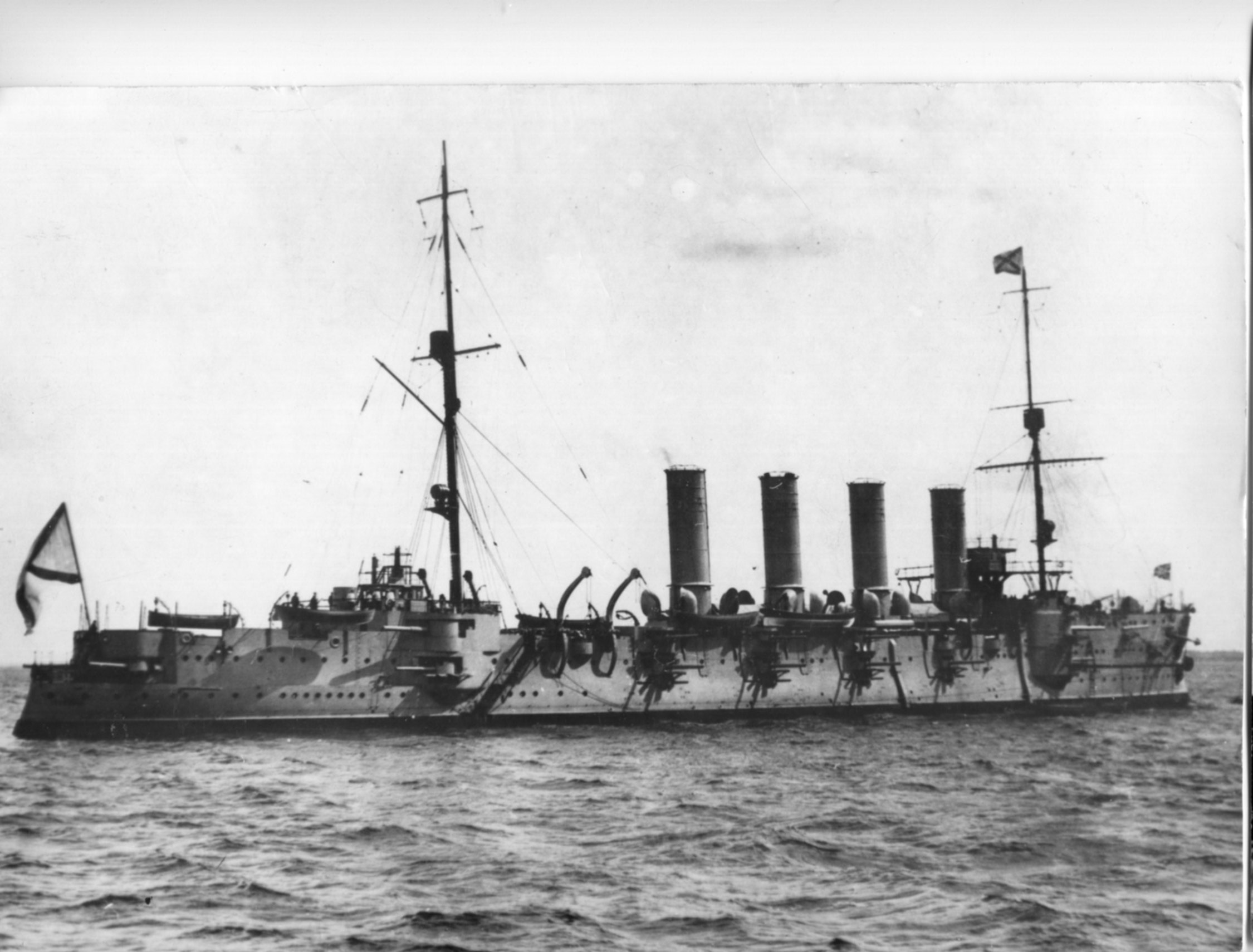
Imperial Russian armoured cruiser Gromoboi.

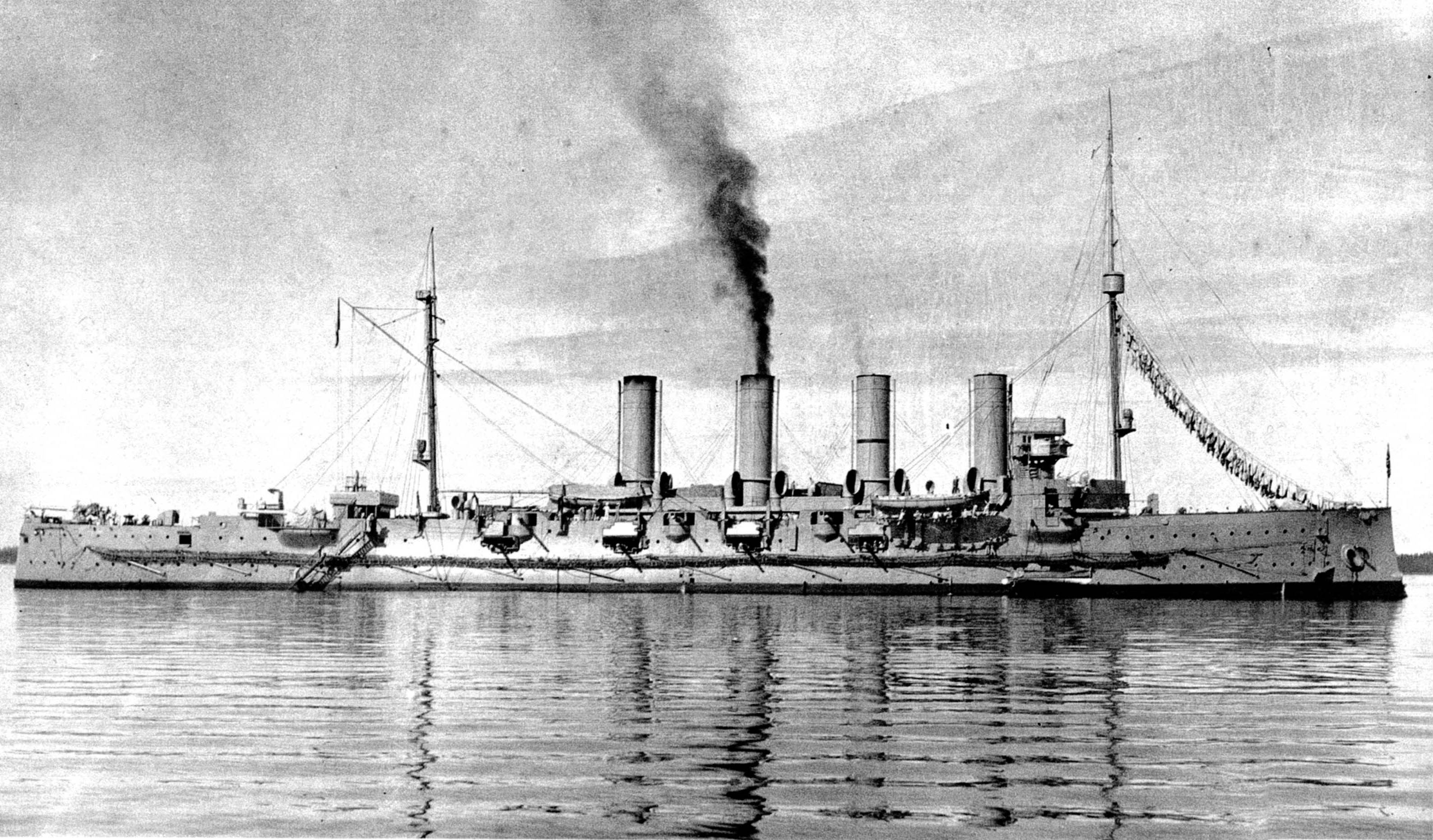
Imperial Russian cruiser Rossiya.

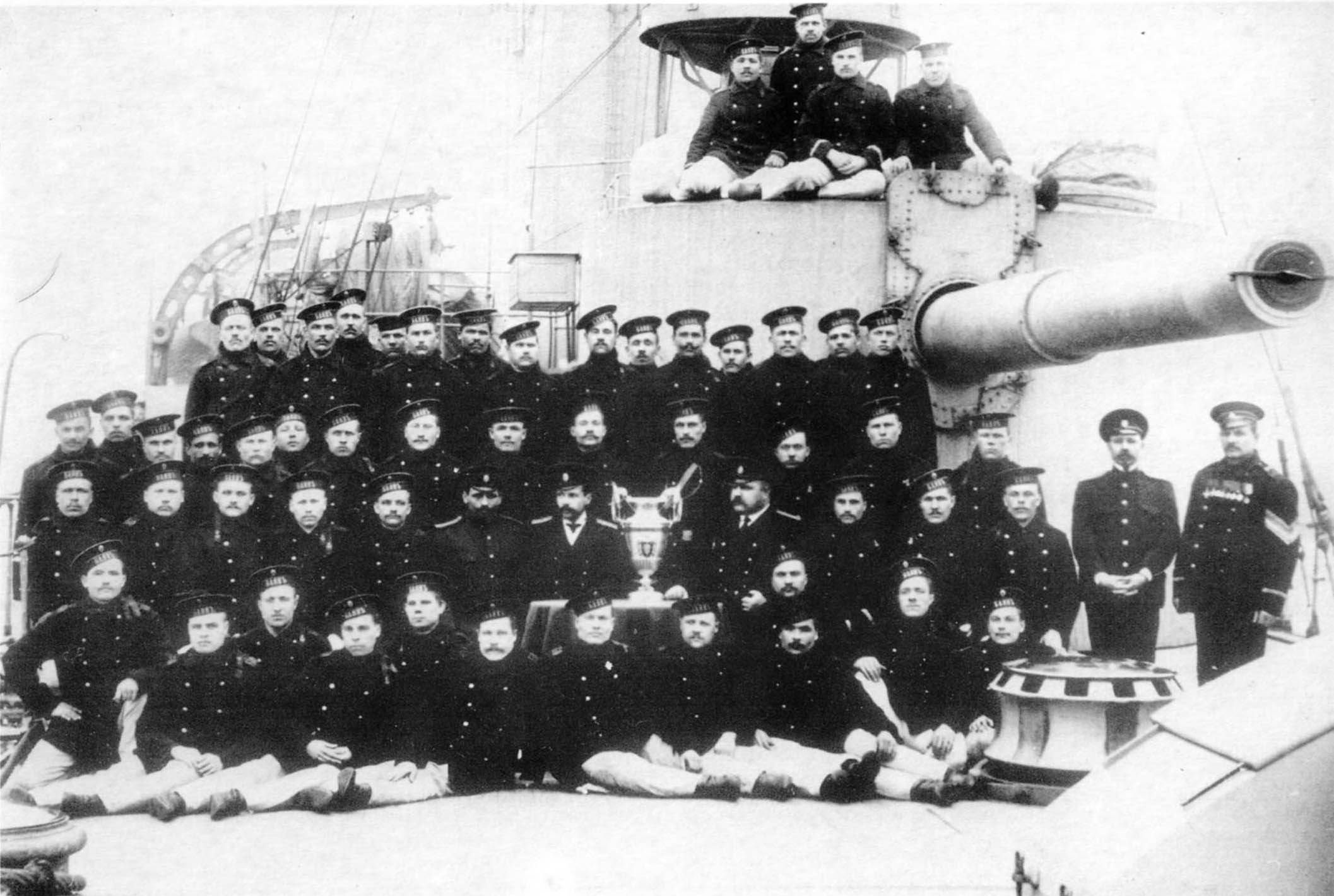
Crew of armored cruiser Bayan.
