= Boyan Kotsev =

Bulgarian cyclist (1930–2013)

Personal information
- Born: 24 April 1930 Sofia, Bulgaria
- Died: 23 June 2013 (aged 83)

Cycling career
- Sport: Cycling

Boyan Kotsev (Bulgarian: Боян Коцев, 24 April 1930 – 23 June 2013) was a Bulgarian cyclist. He competed at the 1952 and 1960 Summer Olympics. Kotsev died on 23 June 2013, at the age of 83.
