= Boyan (bard) =

Bard mentioned in the Rus' epic The Lay of Igor's Campaign

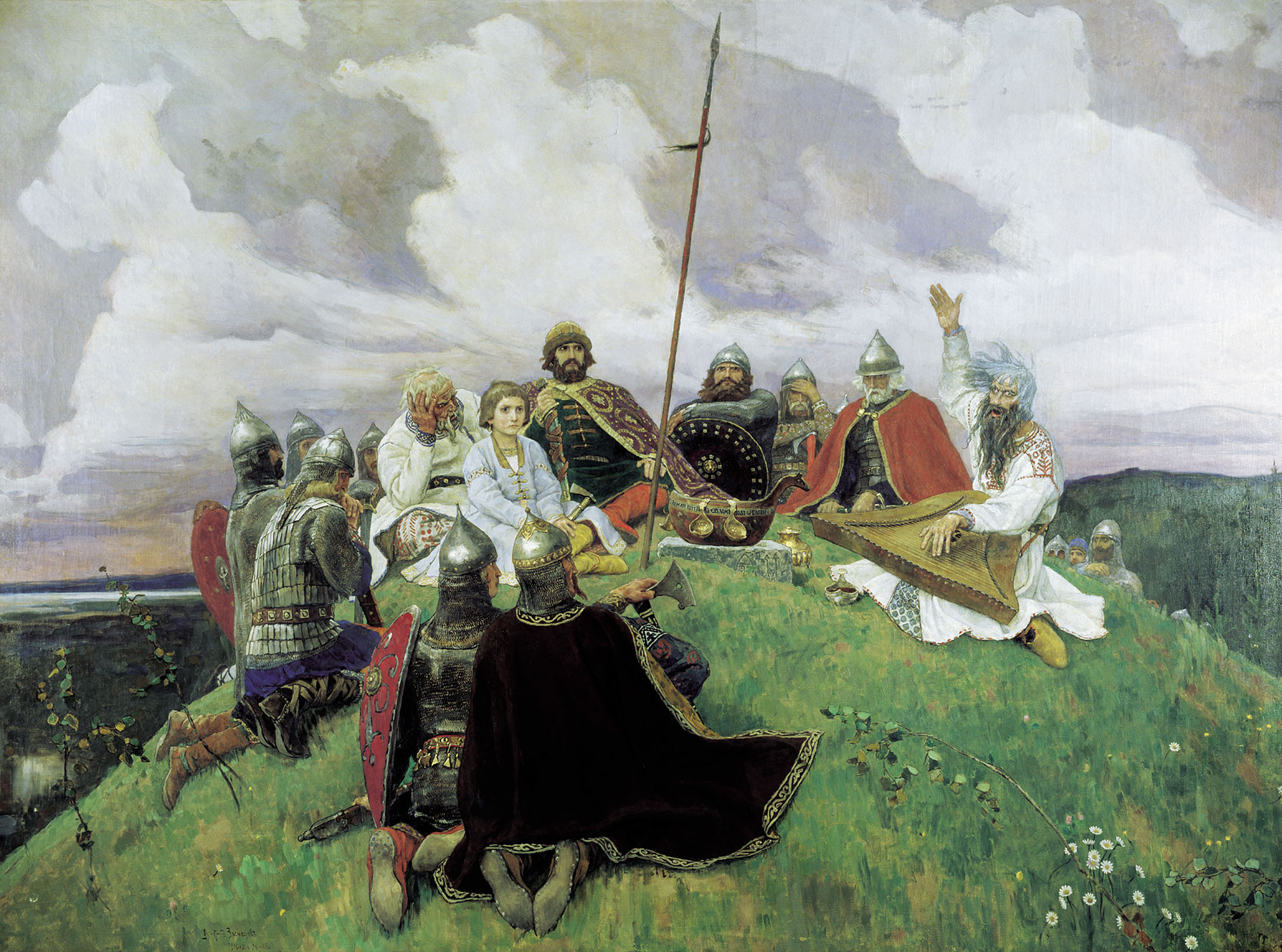
Boyan (accompanying on the gusli) by Viktor Vasnetsov

Boyan (Old East Slavic: Боянъ, romanized: Bojanǔ) is the name of a bard mentioned in the Rus' epic The Lay of Igor's Campaign as being active at the court of Yaroslav the Wise. He is apostrophized as Volos's grandson in the opening lines of The Lay (probably a reference to Veles as the patron of musicians). Historians have been unable to determine whether Boyan was his proper name (as Nikolai Karamzin and Fyodor Buslayev postulated) or if all skalds of Rus were called boyans (Alexander Vostokov).

Although The Lay is the only authentic source mentioning Boyan, his name became exceedingly popular with later generations. He is mentioned in the Zadonshchina and Pushkin's Ruslan and Ludmila. The folklorist Alexander Afanasyev considered Boyan a precursor of Ukrainian kobzars. Soviet scholars tended to associate him with the House of Chernihiv, assuming that he started his career at the court of Mstislav of Tmutarakan. Boris Rybakov supported this theory and linked his name to a graffito on the wall of Saint Sophia Cathedral in Kyiv which mentions a purchase of "Boyan's land" by "Vsevolod's wife".

The Russian version of the button accordion is known as the bayan and was named after legendary Boyan upon its invention in 1907. Boyans were different from skomorokhs but wandering storytellers were also beaten, their fairy tales were forbidden, they were prosecuted by the authorities, and they eventually disappeared.
