= Bayan-class cruiser =

Class of Russian armored cruisers

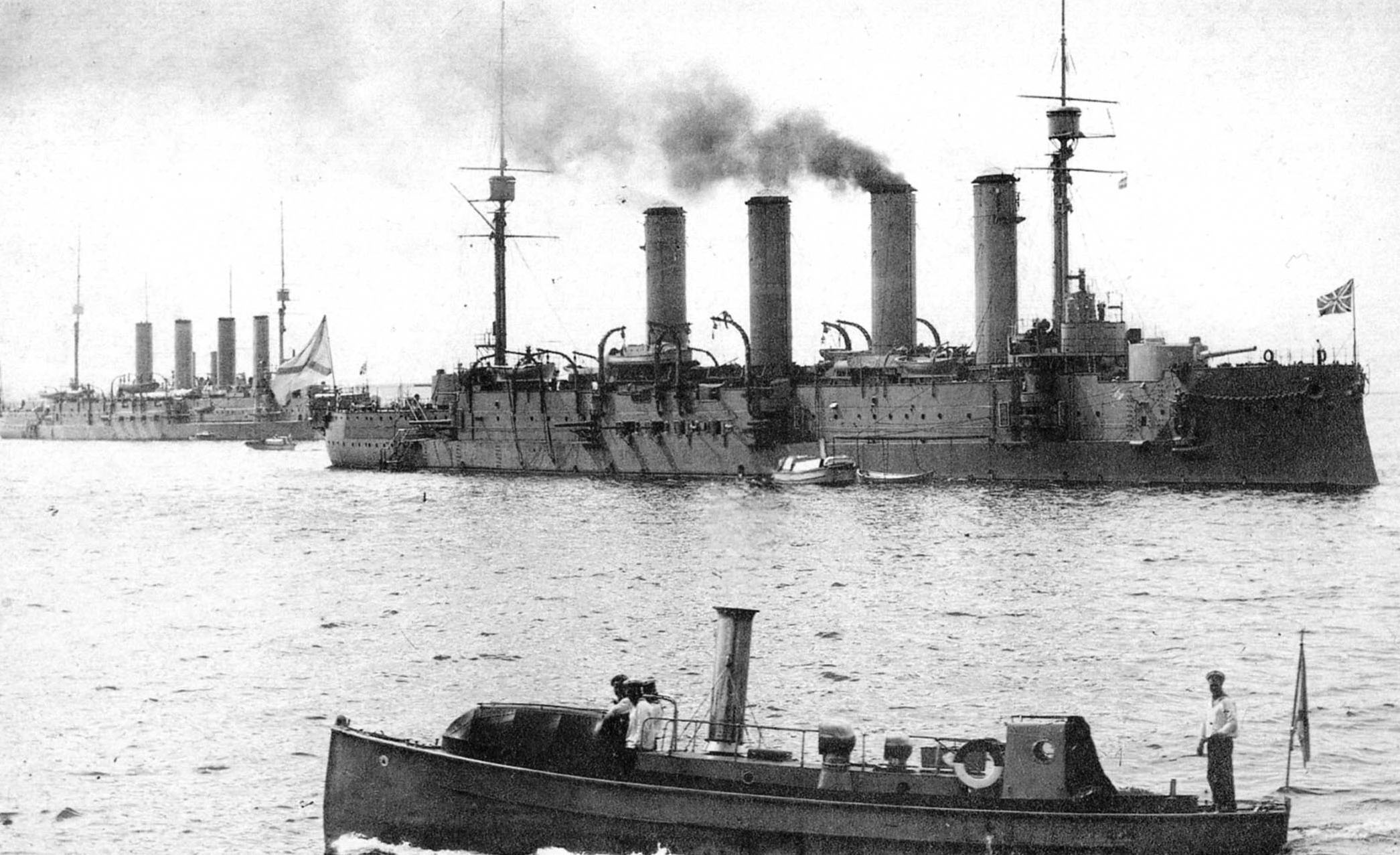
- Admiral Makarov and Bayan at anchor, circa 1913

Class overview
- Name: Bayan
- Operators: Imperial Russian Navy; Imperial Japanese Navy
- Preceded by: Gromoboi
- Succeeded by: Rurik
- Built: 1899–11
- In commission: 1902–20
- Completed: 4
- Lost: 1
- Scrapped: 3

General characteristics
- Type: Armored cruiser
- Displacement: 7,750–7,802 long tons (7,874–7,927 t)
- Length: 449 ft 7 in (137.0 m)
- Beam: 71 ft 6 in (21.8 m)
- Draft: 22 ft (6.7 m)
- Installed power: 26 Belleville boilers; 16,500 ihp (12,300 kW)
- Propulsion: 2 shafts, 2 vertical triple-expansion steam engines
- Speed: 21 kn (39 km/h; 24 mph)
- Range: 3,900 nmi (7,200 km; 4,500 mi) at 10 knots (19 km/h; 12 mph)
- Complement: 573
- Armament: 2 × single 8 in (203 mm) guns; 8 × single 6 in (152 mm) guns; 20 × single 75 mm (3 in) guns; 4 or 8 × single 47 mm (1.9 in) guns; 0 or 2 × single 37 mm (1.5 in) guns; 2 × single 15 or 18 in (381 or 457 mm) torpedo tubes
- Armor: Belt: 3.5–7.9 inches (90–200 mm); Deck: 2.0 inches (50 mm); Gun turrets: 5.2–6.3 inches (132–160 mm); Barbettes: 6.7 in (170 mm); Conning tower: 5.4–6.3 in (136–160 mm)

The Bayan class was a group of four armored cruisers built for the Imperial Russian Navy around the beginning of the 20th century. Two of the ships were built in France, as Russian shipyards had no spare capacity. The lead ship, Bayan, was built several years earlier than the later three. The ship participated in several of the early naval battles of the Russo-Japanese War of 1904–05, and provided naval gunfire support for the Imperial Russian Army until she struck a mine. Bayan was trapped in harbor during the subsequent Siege of Port Arthur, and was sunk by Japanese artillery. She was salvaged and put into service with the Imperial Japanese Navy with the name of Aso. She mostly served as a training ship before she was converted into a minelayer in 1920. The ship was sunk as a target in 1932.

Her three sisters were all assigned to the Baltic Fleet. Pallada was the first ship lost by the Russians during World War I when she was sunk by a German submarine in October 1914. The two surviving ships were modified to lay mines, and participated in the Battle of Åland Islands in 1915 and the German invasion of the Estonian islands in 1917. They were decommissioned in 1918 and sold for scrap in 1922.

== Background ==
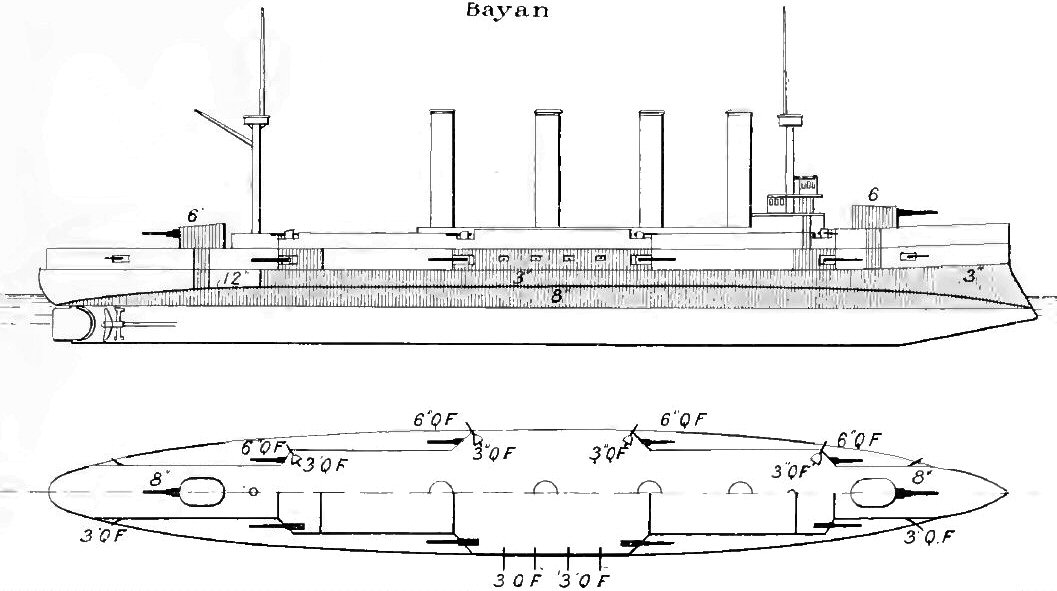
Right elevation and deck plan as depicted in Brassey's Naval Annual 1902

The Bayan class marked a departure from the previous Russian armored cruisers, as they were smaller ships designed to serve as scouts for the fleet rather than as commerce raiders. Authorized in the 1896–1902 building program, the design was outsourced to a French shipyard, Forges et Chantiers de la Méditerranée, because Russian shipyards were already at full capacity. Negotiations began in March 1897, and a contract was signed in May 1898 for one ship with delivery in 36 months.

The Navy was reasonably pleased with the first ship, Bayan, and decided to order another cruiser after the start of the Russo-Japanese War in February 1904. Russian shipyards were still unavailable, so the Navy decided to simply order a repeat with minor modifications based on war experience. This was an attempt to minimize the work load on the Naval Technical Committee (Morskoi tekhnicheskii komitet), but they proved to require more attention than planned and a contract was not signed until 20 April 1905. (Note: All dates used in this article are Old Style) The contract specified that all drawings would be turned over to allow for the construction of two identical ships in St. Petersburg, using newly available slipways. These changes generally added weight and the armor was reduced in thickness to compensate, although the change from Harvey armor to more resistant Krupp armor meant that there was little actual loss in protection.

== Description ==
The Bayan-class ships were 449 feet 7 inches (137.0 m) long overall and 443 feet (135.0 m) between perpendiculars. They had a maximum beam of 57 feet 6 inches (17.5 m), a draft of 22 feet (6.7 m) and displaced 7,750–7,802 long tons (7,874–7,927 t). The ships had a crew of 573 officers and men.

They had two vertical triple-expansion steam engines, each driving a single propeller shaft, using steam provided by 26 Belleville boilers. Designed for a total of 16,500 indicated horsepower (12,304 kW) intended to propel the cruisers at 21 knots (39 km/h; 24 mph), the engines actually developed 17,400–19,320 indicated horsepower (12,980–14,410 kW) during their sea trials and drove the ships to maximum speeds of 20.9–22.55 knots (38.71–41.76 km/h; 24.05–25.95 mph). They could carry a maximum of 1,100–1,200 long tons (1,118–1,219 t) of coal, which gave the first Bayan a range of 3,900 nautical miles (7,200 km; 4,500 mi) at 10 knots (19 km/h; 12 mph).

=== Armament ===
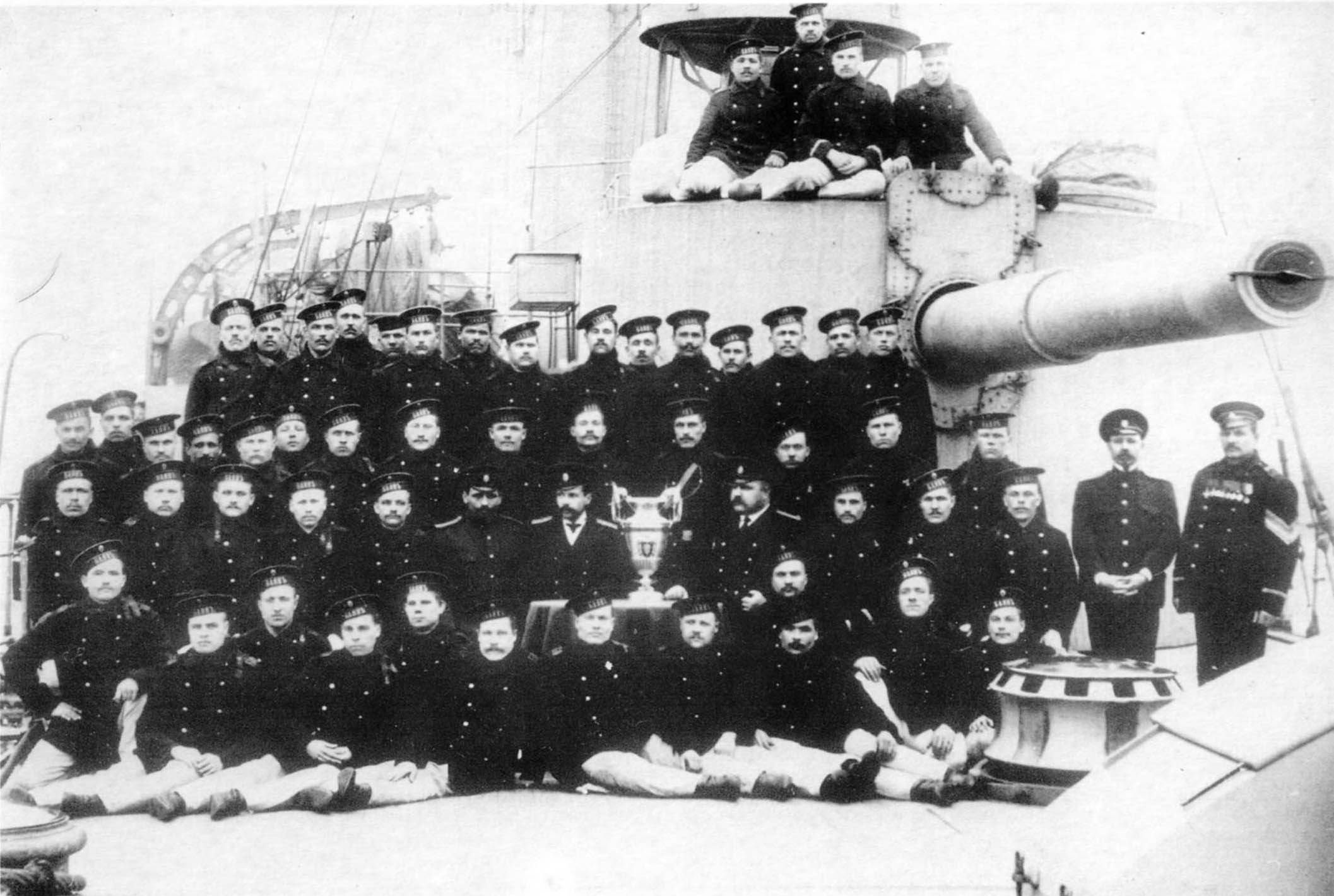
Some of the crew of the second Bayan gathered around the forward eight-inch turret, 1911–18

The main armament of the Bayan-class ships consisted of two 8-inch (203 mm) 45-caliber guns in single-gun turrets fore and aft of the superstructure. The guns fired a 194-pound (87.8 kg) shell at a muzzle velocity of 2,920 ft/s (891 m/s). At an elevation of +15°, they had a range of 12,208 yards (11,163 m). The ships' eight 45-caliber 6-inch (152 mm) Canet Model 1891 quick-firing (QF) guns were mounted in casemates on the sides of the ship's hull. They fired shells that weighed 91 pounds (41.4 kg) with a muzzle velocity of 2,600 ft/s (792.5 m/s). They had a range of 12,602 yards (11,523 m) when fired at an elevation of +20°.

A number of smaller guns were carried for close-range defense against torpedo boats. These included twenty 50-caliber 75-millimeter (3.0 in) Canet Model 1891 QF guns. Eight of these were mounted in casemates in the side of the hull and in the superstructure. The remaining guns were located above the 6-inch gun casemates in pivot mounts with gun shields. The gun fired 10.8-pound (4.91 kg) shells to a range of about 8,606 yards (7,869 m), at an elevation of +20° degrees with a muzzle velocity of 2,830 ft/s (862 m/s). The Bayan class also mounted eight (Bayan) or four 47-millimeter (1.9 in) Hotchkiss guns in the three later ships. They fired a 3.2-pound (1.5 kg) shell. In addition, Bayan was fitted with two 37-millimeter (1.5 in) Hotchkiss guns that fired a 1.1-pound (0.50 kg) shell at a muzzle velocity of 1,540 ft/s (470 m/s).

Bayan was equipped with two submerged 15-inch (381 mm) torpedo tubes, one on each broadside, while those of the three later ships were 18 inches (457 mm) in size.

=== Protection ===
The waterline belt of the Bayan-class ships was 6.9–7.9 inches (175–200 mm) (Note: Where two figures are given, the higher figure applies only to the first ship of the class.) thick over her machinery spaces. Fore and aft, it reduced to 3.5–3.9 inches (90–100 mm). The upper armor strake and the armor protecting the casemates was 2.4 inches (60 mm) thick. The thickness of the armored deck was 2 inches (50 mm); over the central battery it was a single plate, but elsewhere it consisted of a 1.2-inch (30 mm) plate over two 0.39-inch (10 mm) plates. The gun turret sides were protected by 5.2–5.9 inches (132–150 mm) of armor and their roofs were 1.2 inches thick. The barbettes were protected by armor plates 6.7-inch (170 mm) thick. The sides of the conning tower were 5.4–6.3 inches (136–160 mm) thick.

== Ships ==
Construction data
| Ship | Builder | Laid down | Launched | Entered service |
|---|---|---|---|---|
| Bayan (Баян) | Forges et Chantiers de la Méditerranée, La Seyne-sur-Mer, France | March 1899 | 31 May 1900 | December 1902 |
| Admiral Makarov (Адмирал Макаров) | Forges et Chantiers de la Méditerranée, La Seyne-sur-Mer, France | 3 April 1905 | 25 April 1906 | April 1908 |
| Bayan | New Admiralty Shipyard, Saint Petersburg | 15 August 1905 | 2 August 1907 | 30 November 1911 |
| Pallada (Паллада) | New Admiralty Shipyard, Saint Petersburg | August 1905 | 28 October 1906 | 8 February 1911 |

== Service ==
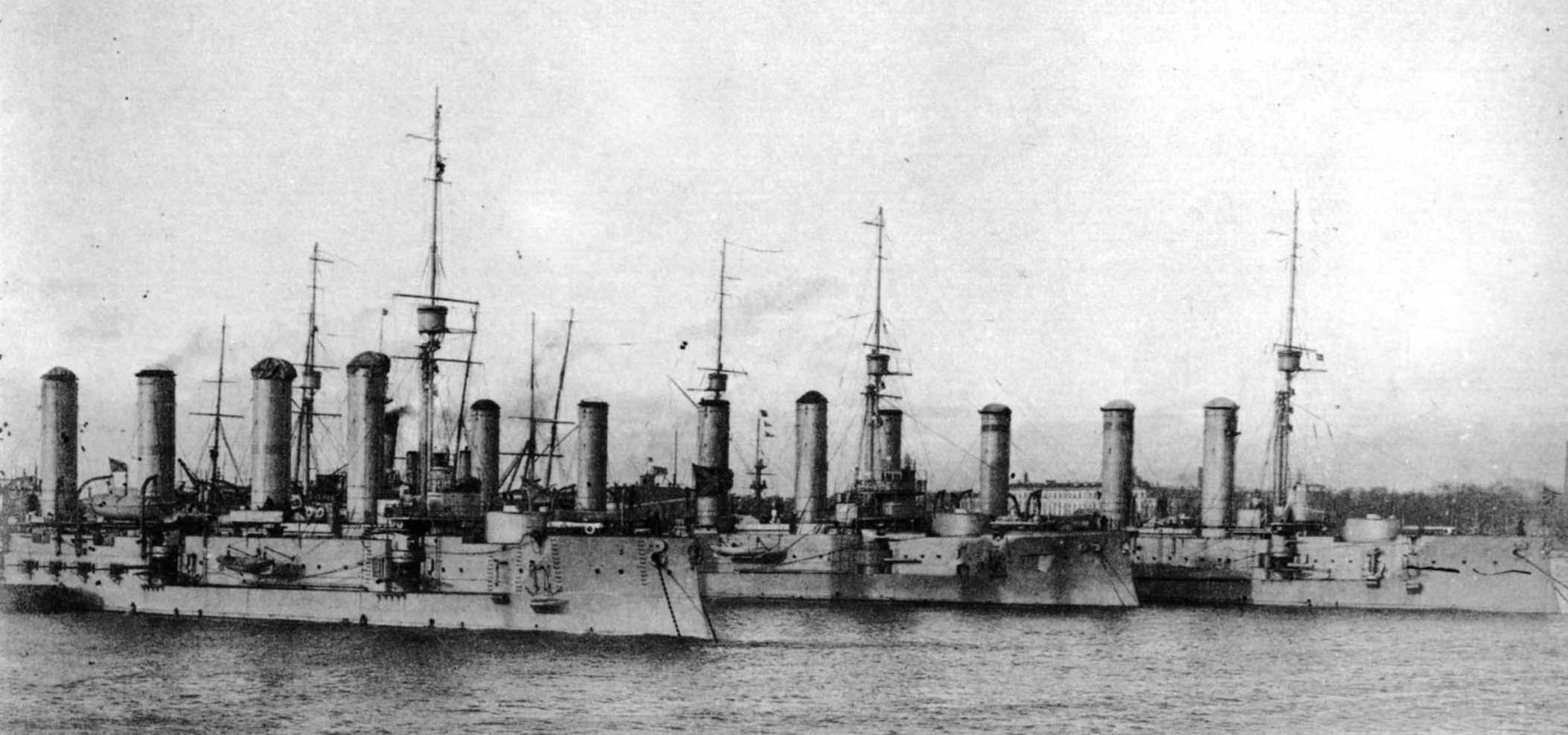
The three surviving ships at anchor, circa 1913

Bayan was assigned to the First Pacific Squadron after completion, and based at Port Arthur from the end of 1903. She suffered minor damage during the Battle of Port Arthur at the beginning of the Russo-Japanese War and participated in the action of 13 April 1904, when Vice Admiral Tōgō Heihachirō successfully lured out a portion of the Pacific Squadron, including Vice Admiral Stepan Makarov's flagship, the battleship Petropavlovsk. When Makarov spotted the five Japanese battleships, he turned back for Port Arthur, and Petropavlovsk struck a minefield and quickly sank after a mine detonated one of her magazines. After bombarding Imperial Japanese Army positions on 27 July, Bayan struck a mine and was under repair for the next month or so. She was subsequently trapped in Port Arthur and sunk at her mooring by Japanese howitzer shells on 8 December.

The ship was refloated by Japanese engineers the following year; repairs, re-boilering, and the replacement of her armament with Japanese weapons took until 1908 to complete. Renamed Aso in Japanese service, she initially served as a training ship before she was converted into a minelayer in 1920. Aso was decommissioned on 1 April 1930 and renamed Hai Kan No. 4. She was sunk as a target on 4 August 1932 by two submarine torpedoes.

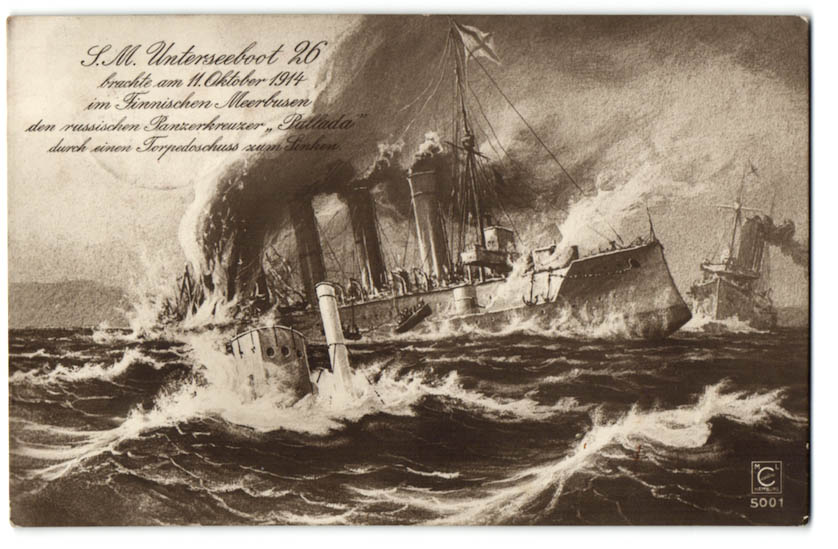
A German postcard illustrating the sinking of Pallada

All three of the later ships were assigned to the Baltic Fleet upon completion, although Admiral Makarov was detached to the Mediterranean several times before the start of World War I in 1914. During the first month of the war, Pallada captured codebooks from the German cruiser Magdeburg that had run aground. She was torpedoed by the German submarine SM U-26 on 11 October 1914 and was lost with all hands.

The surviving sisters were modified to lay mines shortly after the war began. They laid mines themselves during the war and provided cover for other ships laying minefields. Admiral Makarov and Bayan fought several inconclusive battles with German ships during the war, including the Battle of Åland Islands in mid–1915, and they also defended Moon Sound during the German invasion of the Estonian islands in late 1917, where Bayan was badly damaged. Their 75 mm guns were removed in 1916–1917 and replaced by one 8-inch and four 6-inch guns. A pair of anti-aircraft guns were also added. Admiral Makarov was in Helsingfors (Helsinki) when Finland declared independence in March 1918, and was forced to evacuate even though the Gulf of Finland was still frozen over. She reached Kronstadt after what became known as the "Ice Voyage". The sisters were decommissioned in 1918 and sold for scrap in 1922.
