= Russian cruiser Rurik (1906) =

Armored cruiser of the Russian Imperial Navy

Coordinates: 55°08′N 18°30′E

- Rurik after the installation of her pole fore mast

Class overview
- Preceded by: Bayan class
- Succeeded by: None

History

Russian Empire
- Name: Rurik
- Namesake: Rurik
- Awarded: June 1905
- Builder: Vickers, Sons & Maxim
- Laid down: 22 August 1905
- Launched: 17 November 1906
- Completed: September 1908
- Out of service: October 1918
- Stricken: 1 November 1923
- Fate: Broken up, 1924–1925

General characteristics
- Type: Armored cruiser
- Displacement: 15,190 long tons (15,430 t)
- Length: 161.23 m (529 ft) loa
- Beam: 22.86 m (75 ft)
- Draft: 7.92 m (26 ft)
- Installed power: 28 × Belleville type water-tube boilers; 2 × screw propellers; 19,700 indicated horsepower (14,700 kW)
- Propulsion: 2 × triple-expansion steam engines
- Speed: 21 knots (39 km/h; 24 mph)
- Range: 6,100 nautical miles (11,300 km; 7,000 mi) at 10 kn (19 km/h; 12 mph)
- Crew: 26 officers; 910 enlisted men
- Armament: 4 × 254 mm (10 in) guns; 8 × 203 mm (8 in) guns; 20 × 120 mm (4.7 in) guns; 4 × 47 mm (1.9 in) guns; 2 × 457 mm (18 in) torpedo tubes
- Armor: Belt: 76–152 mm (3–6 in); Turrets 203 mm (8 in); Barbettes: 180 mm; Deck: 25 to 38 mm (1.0 to 1.5 in); Casemates: 76 mm; Conning tower: 203 mm

Rurik was the last armored cruiser to be built for the Imperial Russian Navy. The ship was designed by the British firm Vickers, Sons and Maxim and built in their shipyard, being laid down in 1905 and completed in 1908. She was armed with a main battery of four 254 mm (10 in) guns and a secondary battery of eight 203 mm (8 in) guns; her top speed was rated at 21 knots (39 km/h; 24 mph). Her design was well regarded and naval historians rate her as one of the best vessels of her type ever built. Intended as the first of a three-ship class, Rurik's sisters were cancelled with the advent of the British battlecruiser HMS Invincible which was more powerfully armed and faster such that Rurik was rendered obsolete.

Rurik served as the flagship of the Russian Baltic Fleet for much of her relatively short career. She made one overseas cruise with a trip to the Mediterranean Sea in mid-1910, but spent the rest of her early career in the Baltic Sea. After the start of World War I, she operated with the other cruisers of the fleet, making raids on German positions in the southern Baltic, and after being modified to carry naval mines, took part in laying offensive minefields to block German naval traffic. She saw one major action, the Battle of Åland Islands, in July 1915. There, she engaged three German cruisers; she failed to score any hits and was struck several times, though she was not seriously damaged and her presence convinced the Germans to retreat.

The ship was badly damaged by a German mine in November 1916 and spent the next several months under repair. During that period out of service, the Russian Revolution toppled the Imperial government and ultimately led to the Bolshevik seizure of power late that year. The resulting Treaty of Brest-Litovsk ended the war for Russia and Rurik was laid up in Kronstadt in October 1918. She lingered there for another three years in a state of preservation, but by November 1923, she was in poor condition. The new Soviet Navy decided to break up the ship and she was towed to Petrograd, being scrapped there between 1924 and 1925.

== Design ==
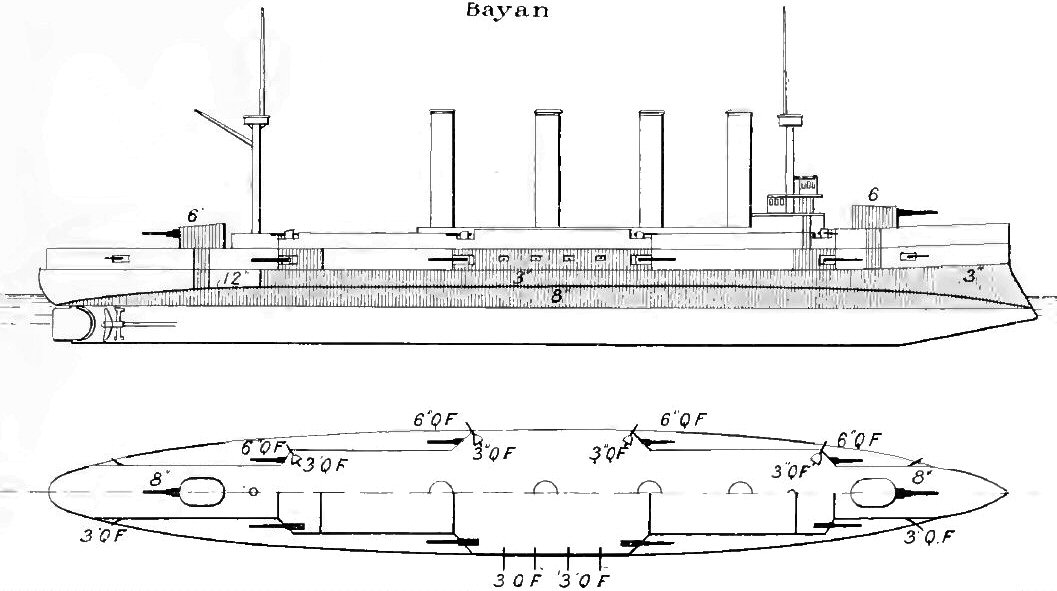
Profile and plan drawing of the Bayan class that preceded Rurik

In July 1904, the Imperial Russian Navy held a design competition that solicited tenders from several foreign and domestic shipyards to design a new armored cruiser. Maximum displacement was limited to 15,000 long tons (15,000 t), more than twice that of the preceding Bayan class of armored cruisers. Vickers won the competition to build the ship in June 1905, and the company offered several proposals, including a vessel armed with a dozen 254 mm (10 in) guns, though the Russians opted for a slightly smaller vessel displacing around 13,500 long tons (13,700 t) that carried four of the 254 mm guns and twelve 203 mm (8 in) guns, along with a defensive armament of twenty 75 mm (3 in) guns.

Before construction work began, refinements were made to the design based on experiences gathered during the Russo-Japanese War of 1904–1905. The defensive battery was increased to 120 mm (4.7 in) guns since the 75 mm guns were no longer sufficiently powerful to deal with modern torpedo boats and destroyers. To save weight, four of the 203 mm guns were removed. Side armor had proved to be critically important in the battles against Japan, and so the ship's armor was strengthened. Despite the weight savings measures, displacement increased by about 1,500 long tons (1,500 t). The Russian Navy had originally planned to build another two cruisers to the same design in domestic shipyards, but budgetary problems, coupled with the advent of the steam turbine-powered, all-big-gun battlecruisers of the British Invincible class in 1907 rendered the plans moot.

Despite the appearance of more powerful battlecruisers before her completion, Rurik is generally considered to have been a very good design. N. J. M. Campbell states that Rurik was "the best large ship laid down for the Russian Navy up to 1905 and one of the best armored cruisers ever built." Anthony Watts concurs, describing her as "one of the finest armoured cruisers ever built."

=== General characteristics and propulsion machinery ===
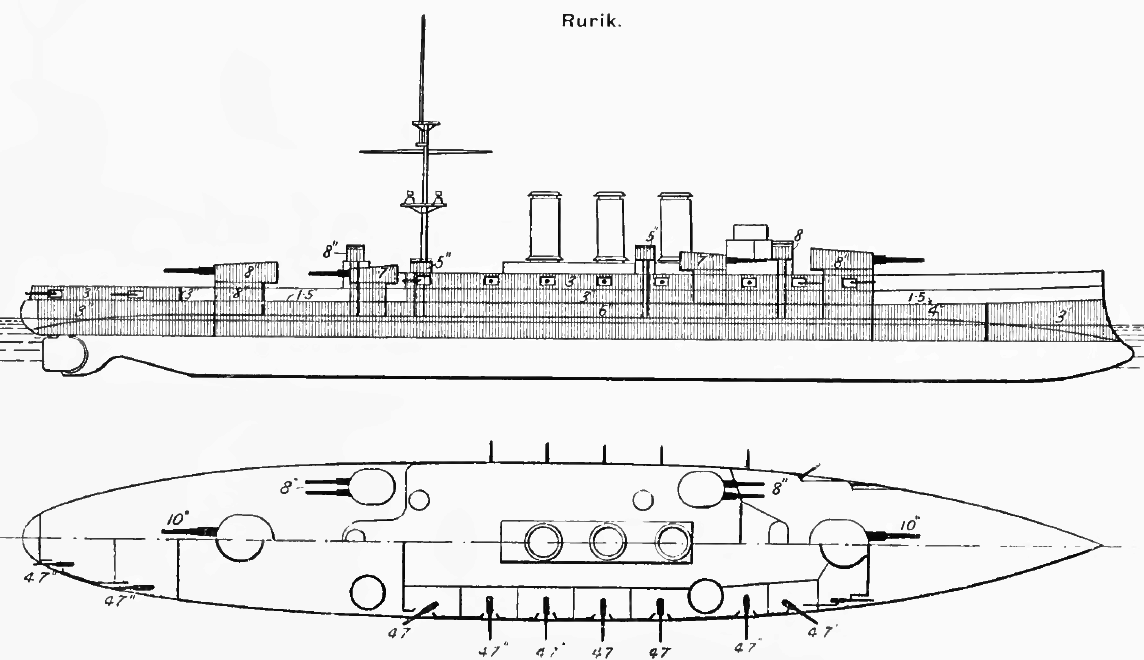
Profile and plan drawing of Rurik in her original configuration

Rurik was 149.4 m (490 ft 2 in) long between perpendiculars, 157.6 m (517 ft 1 in) long at the waterline, and 161.23 m (529 ft) long overall. She had a beam of 22.86 m (75 ft) and a draft of 7.92 m (26 ft) and displaced 15,190 long tons (15,430 t). Her hull featured a long forecastle deck that extended to her main mast and incorporated a pronounced ram bow. Her superstructure was minimal, consisting primarily of her main conning tower forward with a command bridge and a smaller, secondary conning tower aft.

She was completed with just the pole main mast that was placed just ahead of the rear conning tower, but around the time she entered service in 1909, a pole fore mast was installed atop her forward conning tower as well. By 1917, the fore mast had been replaced with a sturdier tripod mast to support a spotting top to help the direction of her armament. Steering was controlled by a single rudder. Her crew numbered 26 officers and 910 enlisted men.

The ship's propulsion system consisted of two vertical triple-expansion steam engines that drove a pair of screw propellers. Steam was provided by twenty-eight coal-fired Belleville type water-tube boilers, which were vented through three funnels located amidships. The power plant was rated to produce 19,700 indicated horsepower (14,700 kW) for a top speed of 21 knots (39 km/h; 24 mph). Coal storage amounted to 1,920 long tons (1,950 t). While steaming at a more economical 10 knots (19 km/h; 12 mph), Rurik could cruise for 6,100 nautical miles (11,300 km; 7,000 mi).

=== Armament ===
Rurik's forward main battery turret; two of her secondary turrets are visible to either side

Rurik's main battery consisted of four 254 mm (10 in) 50-caliber (cal.) guns in a pair of twin gun turrets, mounted fore and aft on the centerline. These guns and their turrets were designed by Vickers specifically for Rurik. The turrets were oval-shaped and sat atop a working chamber that handled shells and propellant charges brought up from the magazines below. One set of hoists brought the munitions up to the working chambers from their magazines, and another set transferred them up to the turrets. In addition to the split hoist arrangement, anti-flash precautions included a sprinkler system in the magazines and provisions to quickly flood them in the event of a serious fire. The guns fired 225.2 kg (496 lb) armor piercing (AP) or high explosive (HE) shells at a muzzle velocity of 899 m/s (2,950 ft/s). At their maximum elevation of 21 degrees, the guns had a range of 22,224 m (24,304 yd) for the AP round and 18,520 m (20,250 yd) for the HE variant. The guns had to be returned to between −5 and 8 degrees of elevation to be reloaded. The guns had a rate of fire of two shots per minute.

Her main battery was supported by a secondary battery of eight 203 mm 50 cal. Pattern 1905 guns in four twin turrets, which were placed on the corners of the superstructure, two turrets per broadside. These were also Vickers designs, though they had been used on a number of earlier Russian pre-dreadnought battleships. They fired a 139.2 kg (307 lb) semi-armor-piercing (SAP) shell at a muzzle velocity of 792.5 m/s (2,600 ft/s). At the elevation of 15 degrees, they could hit targets out to 15,729 m (17,201 yd); the turrets allowed elevation from −5 to 25 degrees, but range figures at maximum elevation are unknown. The turrets were broadly similar to the 254 mm guns, but the guns could be reloaded at any angle of elevation. The guns could fire three shells per minute.

For defense against torpedo boats, the ship carried a tertiary battery of twenty 120 mm 50 cal. guns carried individually in casemates. Sixteen were located in the forecastle deck, clustered around the superstructure, while the remaining four were located in the stern. They fired a 28.97 kg (63.9 lb) SAP shell at a velocity of 792.5 m/s, and at an elevation of 19.5 degrees, had a range of 13,718 m (15,002 yd). Their rate of fire was eight rounds per minute. Four 47 mm (1.9 in) 43 cal. Hotchkiss guns rounded out the armament. She was also armed with a pair of 457 mm (18 in) torpedo tubes. The M1908 torpedo carried a 95 kg (209 lb) warhead and had a range of 1,000 m (1,100 yd) at a speed of 38 knots (70 km/h; 44 mph); the range doubled when they were set to 27 knots (50 km/h; 31 mph). These were later replaced with M1912 variants, which increased the warhead to 100 kg (220 lb). Their performance increased considerably, reaching 2,000 m (2,200 yd) at a speed of 43 knots (80 km/h; 49 mph) and 5,000 m (5,500 yd) at 30 knots (56 km/h; 35 mph).

=== Armor ===
The ship was protected with Krupp cemented armor plate. Her armor belt covered the side of the hull from 2.36 m (7 ft 9 in) above the waterline and 1.5 m (5 ft) below. The main section of belt, between the barbettes for the 254 mm guns, was 152 mm (6 in) thick, tapering to 138 mm (5 in) at the top edge and 104 mm (4 in) at the bottom. Forward of the main section, the belt was reduced to 102 mm with a 76 mm (3 in) bottom edge, while aft, the belt was a uniform thickness of 76 mm. The aft section did not extend all the way to the sternpost, instead terminating at a 76 mm transverse bulkhead. Above the belt, a strake of armor that was 76 mm thick covered the tertiary casemates. There were three armored decks; the lower deck was 25 mm (1 in) thick, with sloped sides that were 38 mm (1.5 in) and connected to the bottom edge of the belt. The main deck was also 38 mm thick, and above that, the roof of the casemate battery was 25 mm.

Rurik's conning tower had 203 mm of armor plate on the sides. Her main battery turrets consisted of 203 mm on the front and sides and sloped 64 mm (2.5 in) roofs, and they were supported by 180 mm (7 in) barbettes that extended down to the ammunition magazines. Behind the belt, the barbettes reduced in thickness to 50 to 115 mm (2.0 to 4.5 in). The secondary turrets received slightly lighter protection, with 180 mm sides and faces and 50 mm roofs. Their barbettes were 152 mm thick above the belt and 38–76 mm below. Underwater protection consisted of a torpedo bulkhead that was 38 mm thick, set back about 3.4 m (11 ft) from the side of the ship. It covered the ship's citadel.

== Service history ==
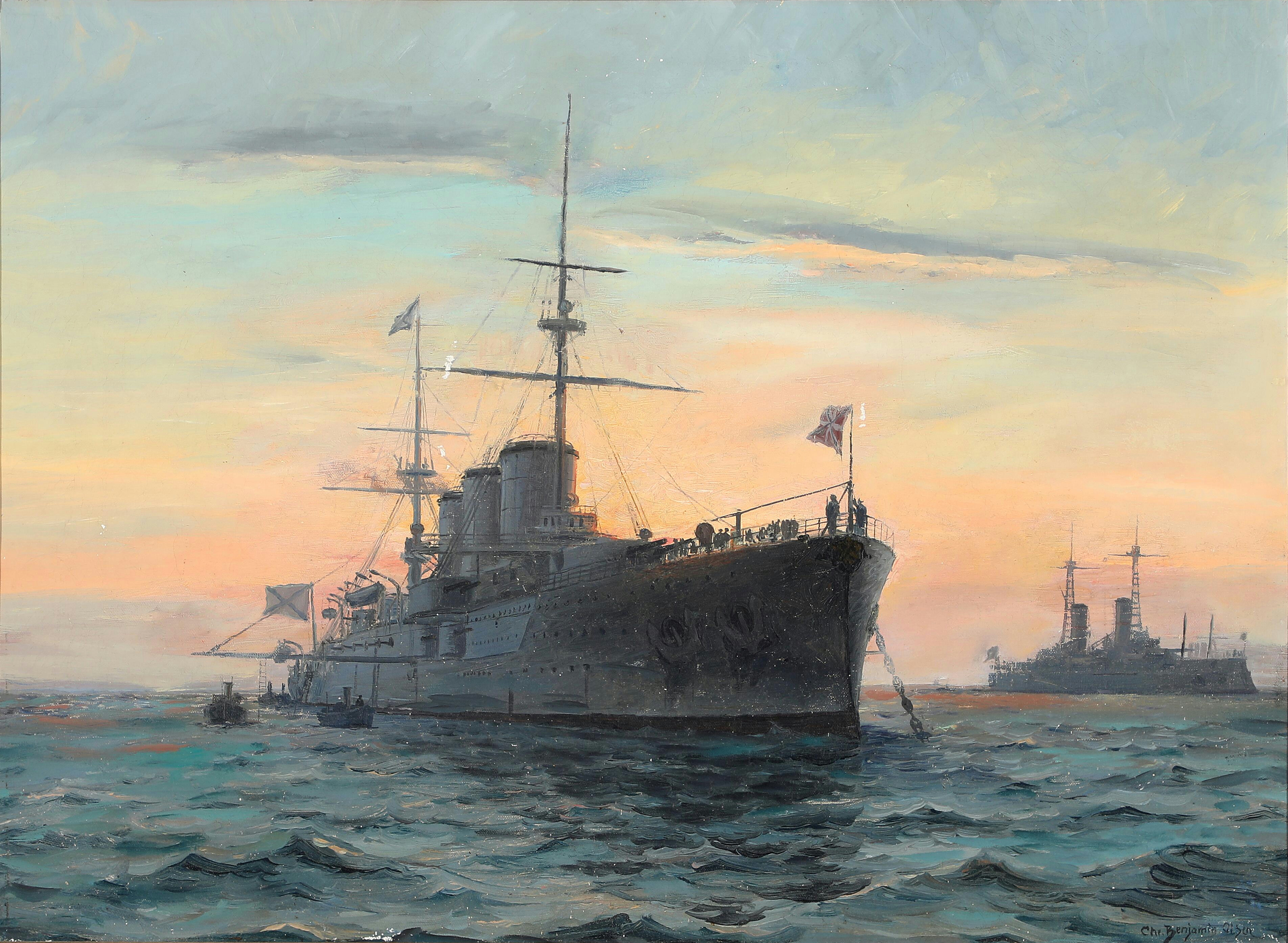
Rurik in Danish waters before World War I. Painting by Christian Benjamin Olsen.

Rurik shortly before the outbreak of World War I

The keel for Rurik was laid down on 22 August 1905, (Note: The dates used in this article are New Style) and she was launched on 17 November 1906. Structural weaknesses were revealed during gunnery testing in 1907, but the Russian Navy decided to remedy the defects after delivery rather than delay her completion. The testing included firing thirty rounds from two of the 254 mm guns, another thirty shells from two of the 203 mm guns, and fifteen shots from the 120 mm guns. During steam trials in 1908, she exceeded her design speed and horsepower. The ship was completed in September 1908 and delivered to the Russian fleet. Upon arrival, she was sent to the shipyard in Kronstadt for modifications to her hull structure to correct the design problems. She operated in the Baltic Sea over the following two years, and in July 1910, she was sent on a cruise in the Mediterranean Sea. She returned to the Baltic, where she remained for the next three years. Starting in 1913, she served as the flagship of the Baltic Fleet.

=== World War I ===
At the start of World War I in July 1914, Russia had not yet completed its Borodino-class battlecruisers or Gangut-class dreadnought battleships, leaving Rurik and the Bayan-class cruisers as the core of the Baltic Fleet. These ships bore the burden of naval operations against the significantly more powerful Imperial German Navy in the Baltic. At the time, Rurik served as the flagship of Admiral Nikolai Ottovich von Essen, the commander of Russian naval forces in the Baltic. Rurik's commander was initially Captain Mikhail Bakhirev. He sortied with Rurik and the armored cruiser Pallada on 27 August to make a sweep into the western Baltic in the vicinity of Bornholm, Denmark, and Danzig, Germany. They failed to locate any enemy vessels, however. The operation bolstered the morale of the Baltic Fleet, but Tsar Nicholas II refused to grant Essen the freedom of maneuver he sought to force action with the German fleet. The Russians nevertheless won a major intelligence victory that month when the German cruiser SMS Magdeburg ran aground in Russian territory and they were able to recover German code books, allowing the Russian Navy to decrypt German wireless signals.

Illustration of Rurik firing her secondary and tertiary guns

In November, Rurik was modified to serve as a fast minelayer with provisions to carry naval mines. She carried out her first operation on 14 December under the command of Admiral Ludvig Kerber, in company with the cruisers Admiral Makarov and Bayan, while another pair of cruisers covered another minelayer further north. Rurik laid a field of 120 mines off the German port at Danzig during the operation. On 12 January 1915, Rurik sortied for another minelaying operation, this time part of the escort force with Bayan and Admiral Makarov. Over the following two days, three other cruisers laid a series of minefields off the island of Rügen; this was the furthest west the Russian fleet penetrated during the war. This minefield later damaged the German cruisers Augsburg and Gazelle, the latter beyond the point of repair.

Rurik escorted a group of minelayers sent to lay another field off Danzig on 13 February 1915, ran aground and was seriously damaged, forcing the Russians to cancel the operation. Despite taking on 2,400 long tons (2,439 t) of water, with half of her boiler rooms flooded, she was able to free herself and return to port under her own power. Heavy ice in the Baltic curtailed further operations. By that time, the Ganguts had entered service, and the fleet was reorganized. Rurik was assigned to Group 5, along with Bayan and Admiral Makarov, part of the 1st Cruiser Brigade. The cruisers continued to carry out most of the offensive operations, as the new dreadnoughts were considered too valuable to risk. They were instead used as a fleet in being and to guard the Gulf of Finland.

==== Battle of Åland Islands ====
In late June, the Russian naval command planned a bombardment operation to support the garrison at Windau (in what is now Latvia) during a German attack on the port. Initial plans called for an attack on the city of Rostock, well behind German lines, in part to demonstrate the strength of the Russian fleet, but Vice Admiral Vasily Kanin, who had replaced Essen as the fleet commander, refused to grant permission to send Rurik that far into enemy territory. The target of the operation was therefore changed to Memel. Bakhirev, by now promoted to rear admiral, led the bombardment force, the composition of which is unclear. According to Paul Halpern, it consisted of the cruisers Admiral Makarov, Bayan, Bogatyr, and Oleg, while Rurik and the destroyer Novik covered them and a group of submarines screened ahead. But Gary Staff indicates that Rurik, Oleg, and Bogatyr were to conduct the bombardment while Admiral Makarov and Bayan covered them. The ships departed port shortly after midnight on 1 July. Heavy fog forced Bakhirev to cancel the bombardment since they could no longer reliably locate Memel and his cruisers became separated from Rurik and Novik.

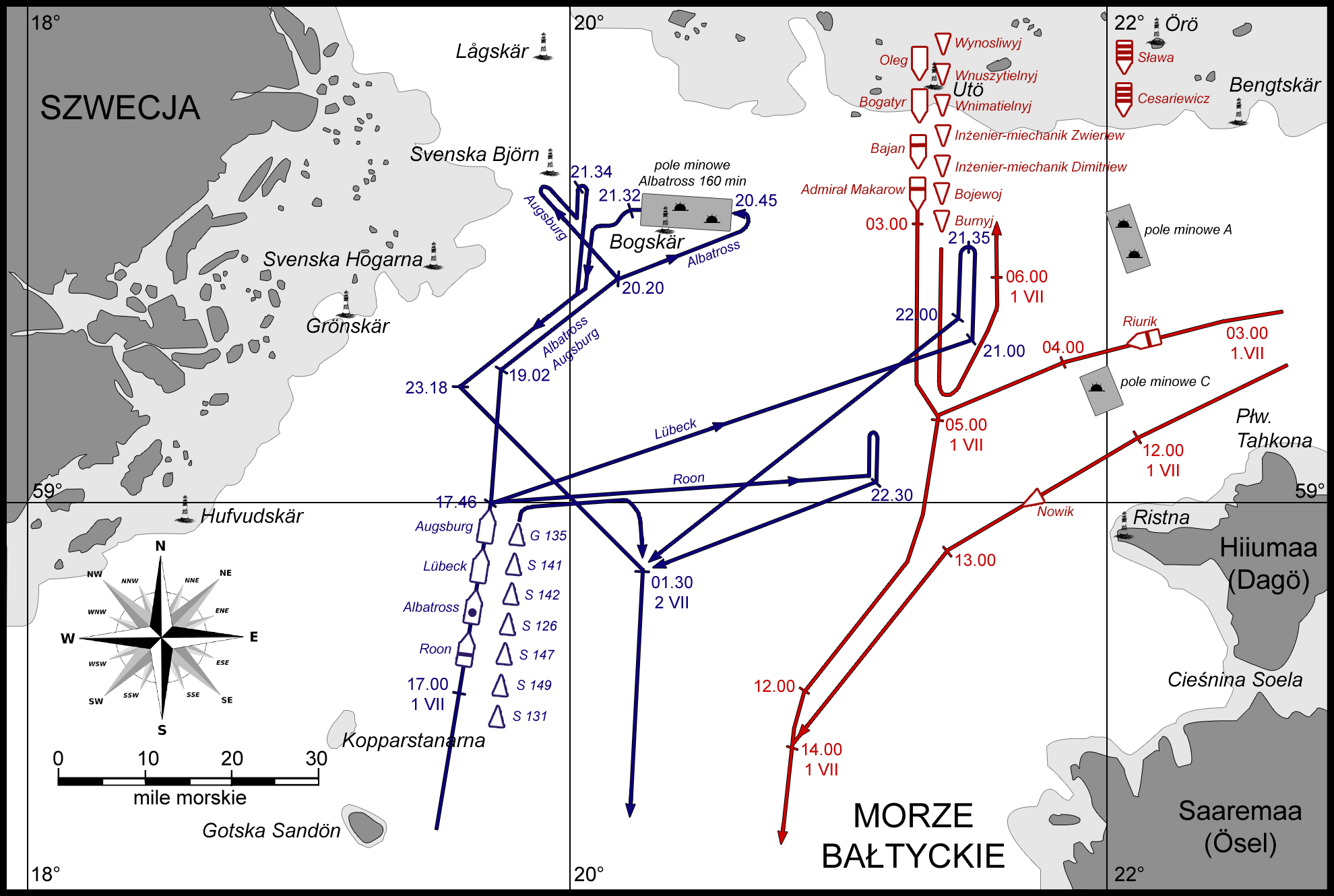
Map of German (blue) and Russian (red) movements during the action

Bakhirev planned to make another attempt the next morning, but he learned by way of decrypted intercepts from German wireless signals of a minelaying operation on the 1st while en route to Riga and decided to try to intercept the vessels instead. He took the four cruisers from the bombardment group, and guided by wireless intercepts, steamed west to ambush the German flotilla that consisted of an armored cruiser, two light cruisers, a minelayer, and seven destroyers. The two sides made contact at around 06:30. In the ensuing Battle of Åland Islands, the Germans turned to flee while the Russian cruisers concentrated on the minelayer SMS Albatross, forcing it ashore.

As he began the engagement, Bakhirev ordered Rurik to reinforce him, and at 09:45, she arrived in the vicinity but found no friendly or enemy vessels. The ship's commander, Captain A. M. Pyshnov, turned his ship north in an attempt to locate Bakhirev's ships, and shortly thereafter, she encountered the German light cruiser SMS Lübeck. The two ships quickly opened fire, and while Rurik was significantly more powerful than her opponent, she failed to score any hits, while receiving ten herself. One started a fire on Rurik's forecastle and a near miss caused a large splash that damaged her forward rangefinder. The German 10.5 cm (4.1 in) shells were not powerful enough to penetrate her armor, but they nevertheless temporarily disabled one of her main battery turrets when fumes from an explosion threatened to poison its crew.

The German armored cruiser SMS Roon then intervened and ordered Lübeck to disengage, and at 10:04, Rurik ceased fire at the light cruiser. The Russian cruiser then turned to engage Roon, which had by that time been joined by the light cruiser Augsburg, opening fire at a range of 15,000 to 16,000 m (16,000 to 17,000 yd). She concentrated most of her fire on Roon, but again failed to score any hits. She received another hit, which struck the rear conning tower and damaged the surrounding superstructure. The German commander decided to attempt to disengage, using the poor visibility to cover his escape; at around the same time, Russian lookouts spotted what they mistakenly believed to be a U-boat. The threat of a submarine attack led Rurik to disengage, which gave the Germans enough time to make good their escape.

==== Later operations ====
On 11 November, Rurik was sent on another minelaying operation to sow a field of 560 mines off the Swedish island of Gotland. Another such mission on 6 December, laying a further 700 mines in the same area. As a result of the Russian mining effort and Allied submarine attacks, the Germans concluded that they could no longer safely operate capital ships in the Baltic. Starting in June 1916, Rurik was sent on several sweeps into the Baltic to search for German merchant shipping, but she only found and sank one vessel during these patrols. While on patrol off the island of Hogland, Russia, on 7 November, she struck a mine and was badly damaged. She remained under repair until April 1917; during this period, her foremast was replaced with the tripod version.

The Russian Revolution began in March 1917 and culminated in the October Revolution in November, (Note: The revolution started on 25 October in the Old Style calendar, hence its name.) which saw the Bolsheviks take power in Russia. The government signed the Treaty of Brest-Litovsk that ended Russia's participation in the conflict. As part of the treaty, Russia granted Finland independence, which forced the fleet to abandon its principal base at Helsingfors (Helsinki) and return to Kronstadt. Rurik was reduced to reserve at Kronstadt in October 1918, and she lay there for the next three years. Initially listed for long-term preservation on 21 May 1921, she was disarmed and useful systems were removed to be preserved ashore. By late 1923, she was in poor condition, and the decision was made to break her up. She was struck from the naval register on 1 November and taken to Petrograd, where she was dismantled over the course of 1924–1925. Her 203 mm guns were later used as coastal artillery batteries.
