= SMS Roon =

Armored cruiser of the German Imperial Navy

- SMS Roon in the Kaiser Wilhelm Canal, c. 1910

History

German Empire
- Name: Roon
- Namesake: Albrecht von Roon
- Builder: Kaiserliche Werft, Kiel
- Laid down: 1 August 1902
- Launched: 27 June 1903
- Commissioned: 5 April 1906
- Decommissioned: 22 September 1911
- Commissioned: 2 August 1914
- Decommissioned: 4 February 1916
- Stricken: 25 November 1920
- Fate: Scrapped 1921

General characteristics
- Class & type: Roon-class cruiser
- Displacement: Normal: 9,533 t (9,382 long tons); Full load: 10,266 t (10,104 long tons)
- Length: 127.8 m (419 ft 3 in)
- Beam: 20.2 m (66 ft 3 in)
- Draft: 7.76 m (25 ft 6 in)
- Installed power: 19,000 metric horsepower (19,000 ihp); 16 × water-tube boilers
- Propulsion: 3 × screw propellers; 3 × triple-expansion steam engines
- Speed: 21.1 knots (39.1 km/h; 24.3 mph)
- Range: 4,200 nmi (7,800 km; 4,800 mi) at 12 knots (22 km/h; 14 mph)
- Crew: 35 officers; 598 enlisted men
- Armament: 4 × 21 cm (8.3 in) SK L/40 guns; 10 × 15 cm (5.9 in) SK L/40 guns; 14 × 8.8 cm (3.5 in) SK L/35 guns; 4 × 45 cm (17.7 in) torpedo tubes
- Armor: Belt: 8–10 cm (3.1–3.9 in); Turrets: 15 cm (5.9 in); Deck: 4–6 cm (1.6–2.4 in)

SMS Roon (Note: "SMS" stands for "Seiner Majestät Schiff" (German: His Majesty's Ship).) was the lead ship of her class of armored cruisers built for the German Kaiserliche Marine (Imperial Navy) in the early 1900s as part of a major naval expansion program aimed at strengthening the fleet. The ship was named after Field Marshal Albrecht von Roon. She was built at the Kaiserliche Werft in Kiel, being laid down in August 1902, launched in June 1903, and commissioned in April 1906. The ship was armed with a main battery of four 21 cm (8.3 in) guns and had a top speed of 20.4 knots (37.8 km/h; 23.5 mph). Like many of the late armored cruisers, Roon was quickly rendered obsolescent by the advent of the battlecruiser; as a result, her career was limited.

Roon served in I Scouting Group, the reconnaissance force of the High Seas Fleet, for the duration of her peacetime career, including several stints as the flagship of the group's deputy commander. During this period, the ship was occupied with training exercises and made several cruises in the Atlantic Ocean. In 1907, she visited the United States to represent Germany during the Jamestown Exposition. In September 1911 she was decommissioned and placed in reserve.

Three years later, the ship was mobilized in August 1914 following the outbreak of World War I and assigned to III Scouting Group, serving initially with the High Seas Fleet in the North Sea. There, she escorted the main German fleet during the raid on Yarmouth in November and the raid on Scarborough, Hartlepool and Whitby in December, though she saw no action during either operation. She was transferred to the Baltic Sea in April 1915 and took part in several operations against Russian forces, including the successful attack on Libau in May and the failed attack on Riga in August. The threat of British submarines convinced the German command to withdraw old vessels like Roon by early 1916, and she was again decommissioned and eventually used as a training ship. Plans to convert her into a seaplane tender in 1918 came to nothing with the end of the war, and she was broken up in 1921.

== Design ==
The two Roon-class cruisers were ordered in 1902 as part of the fleet expansion program specified by the Second Naval Law of 1900. The two ships were incremental developments of the preceding Prinz Adalbert-class cruisers, the most significant difference being a longer hull; the extra space was used to add a pair of boilers, which increased power by 2,028 metric horsepower (2,000 ihp) and speed by 0.5 knots (0.93 km/h; 0.58 mph). The launch of the British battlecruiser HMS Invincible in 1907 quickly rendered all of the armored cruisers that had been built by the world's navies obsolescent.

=== Characteristics ===
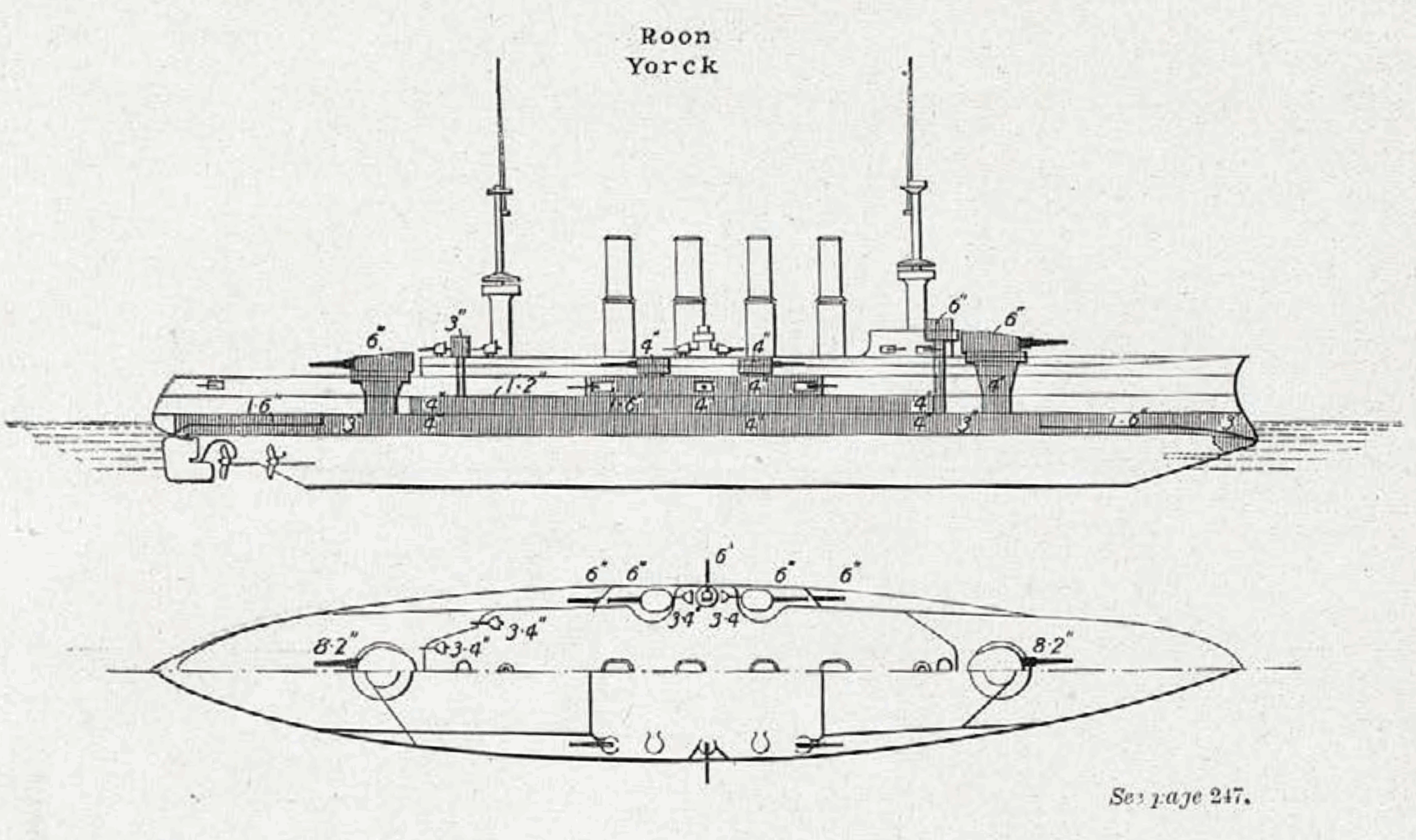
Plan and profile of the Roon class

Roon was 127.8 m (419 ft 3 in) long overall and had a beam of 20.2 m (66 ft 3 in) and a draft of 7.76 m (25 ft 6 in) forward. She displaced 9,533 metric tons (9,382 long tons) as built and 10,266 t (10,104 long tons) fully loaded. The ship had a pronounced ram bow and a small superstructure that consisted primarily of an armored conning tower and bridge structure forward and a smaller, secondary conning tower further aft. She was fitted with a pair of short military masts, which stepped down to lighter poles to reduce weight high in the ship. Roon had a crew of 35 officers and 598 enlisted men.

She was propelled by three vertical triple expansion engines, each driving a screw propeller, with steam provided by sixteen coal-fired water-tube boilers. The boilers were vented through four closely spaced funnels. The ship's propulsion system developed a total of 19,000 metric horsepower (19,000 ihp) and yielded a maximum speed of 21.1 knots (39.1 km/h; 24.3 mph) on trials, falling short of her intended speed of 22 knots (41 km/h; 25 mph). She carried up to 1,570 t (1,550 long tons) of coal, which enabled a maximum range of up to 4,200 nautical miles (7,800 km; 4,800 mi) at a cruising speed of 12 knots (22 km/h; 14 mph).

She was armed with four 21 cm (8.3 in) SK L/40 guns arranged in two twin-gun turrets, (Note: In Imperial German Navy gun nomenclature, "SK" (Schnelladekanone) denotes that the gun is quick loading, while the L/40 denotes the length of the gun. In this case, the L/40 gun is 40 calibers, meaning that the gun is 40 times as long as it is in bore diameter.) one on either end of the superstructure. Her secondary armament consisted of ten 15 cm (5.9 in) SK L/40 guns; four were in single-gun turrets on the upper deck and the remaining six were in casemates in a main-deck battery. For close-range defense against torpedo boats, she carried fourteen 8.8 cm (3.5 in) SK L/35 guns, all in individual mounts in the superstructure and in the hull, either in casemates or open pivot mounts with gun shields. She also had four 45 cm (17.7 in) underwater torpedo tubes, one in the bow, one in the stern, and one on each broadside.

The ship was protected with Krupp cemented armor; the belt armor was 10 cm (3.9 in) thick amidships and was reduced to 8 cm (3.1 in) on either end. The main battery turrets had 15 cm (5.9 in) thick faces. Her deck was 4–6 cm (1.6–2.4 in) thick, connected to the lower edge of the belt by 4–5 cm (1.6–2.0 in) thick sloped armor.

== Service history ==
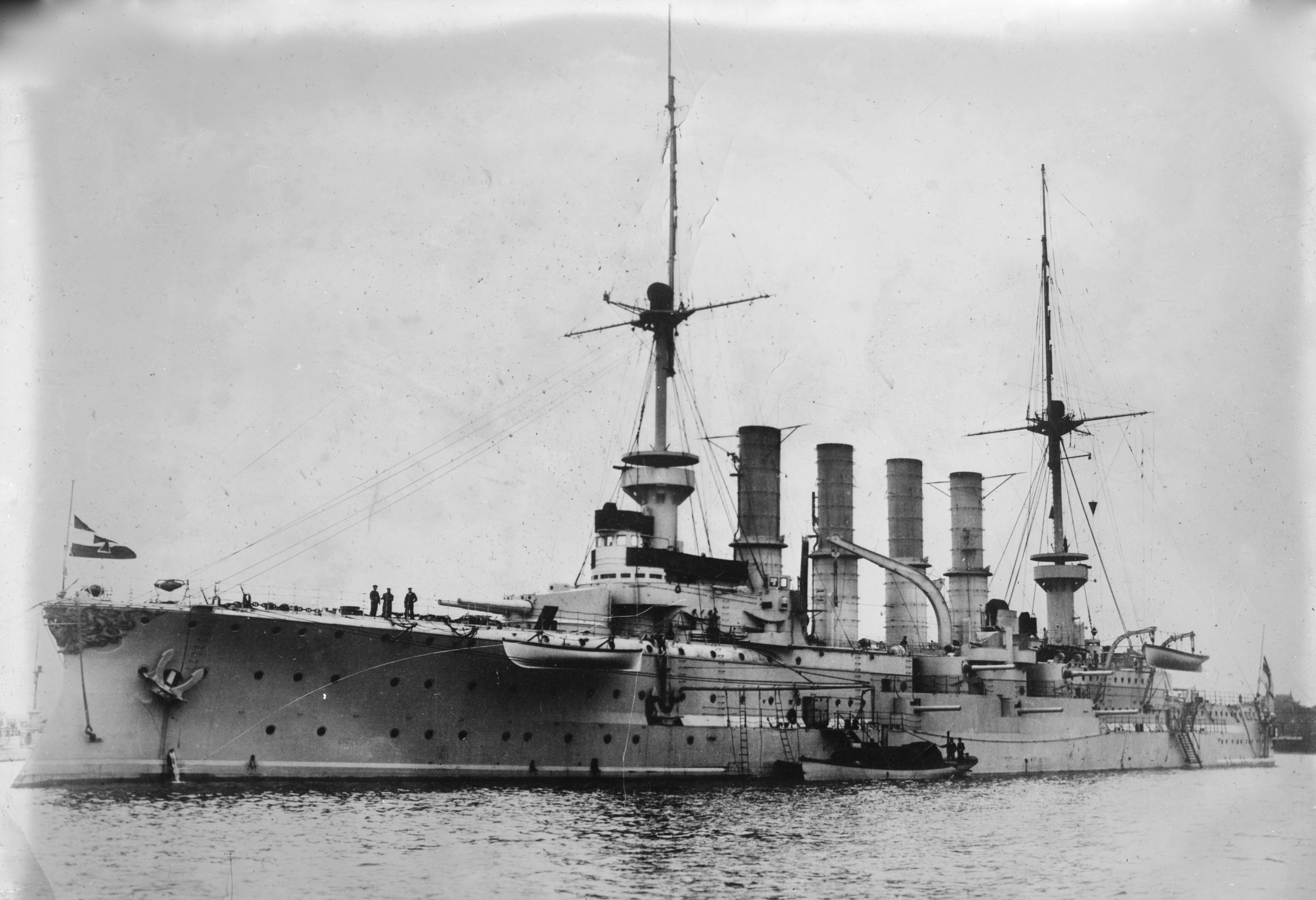
Pre-war photo of SMS Roon, most likely taken during her 1907 visit to the United States

Roon was ordered under the provisional name Ersatz Kaiser as a replacement for the ironclad Kaiser. (Note: German warships were ordered under provisional names. Additions to the fleet were given a single letter; ships intended to replace older or lost vessels were ordered as "Ersatz (name of the ship to be replaced)".) The ship was built at the Imperial Dockyard in Kiel under construction number 28. Her keel was laid down on 1 August 1902 and she was launched on 27 June 1903. At her launching ceremony, Field Marshal Alfred von Waldersee christened the ship Roon after Field Marshal Albrecht von Roon. Fitting-out work then commenced, which included provisions for the cruiser to be used as a flagship, and Roon was commissioned into the German fleet on 5 April 1906. Her first commander was Kapitän zur See (KzS—Captain at Sea) Fritz Hoffmann. The ship then began sea trials that lasted until 9 July; she joined I Scouting Group on 15 August, where she replaced the armored cruiser Friedrich Carl as the flagship of the deputy commander, KzS and Kommodore (Commodore) Raimund Winkler. Roon then participated in the annual fleet maneuvers held in late August and early September. Later that month, Hoffmann was replaced by Fregattenkapitän (FK—Frigate Captain) Oskar von Platen-Hallermund, who commanded the vessel for just a month before he was in turn relieved by KzS Karl Zimmermann. At the same time as Hoffmann's departure, Winkler also left his post, being replaced by KzS and Kommodore Eugen Kalau vom Hofe, who transferred his flag to Friedrich Carl in October.

She spent the following years participating in training exercises and cruises with the ships of I Scouting Group as well as the entire High Seas Fleet. This routine was interrupted in early 1907 when the ship was sent to the United States to participate in the Jamestown Exposition, which commemorated the 300th anniversary of the arrival of colonists in Chesapeake Bay. Kalau von Hofe returned to Roon to lead the German delegation, which also included the light cruiser Bremen; the two cruisers left Kiel on 8 April and crossed the Atlantic to Hampton Roads, Virginia, arriving on 24 April. Two days later, the international fleet, which also included contingents from Great Britain, Japan, Austria-Hungary, France, Italy, and several other nations, held a naval review as part of the exposition. Following the ceremonies, Bremen was detached to remain on station in the Americas while Roon returned to Germany, arriving back in Kiel on 17 May. On her return, Kalau von Hofe shifted back to Friedrich Carl.

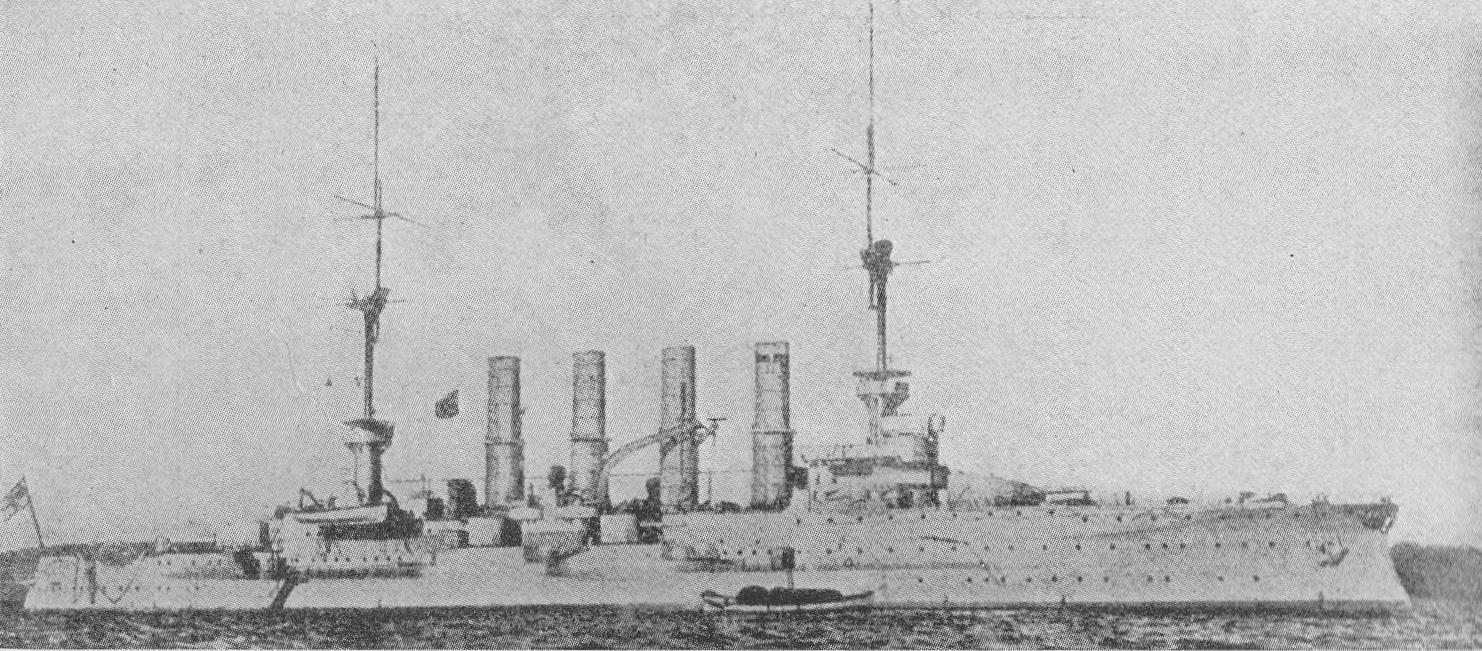
Roon sometime before 1914

From 11 September to 28 October, Roon briefly resumed her role as deputy flagship; Friedrich Carl was at that time serving as the group flagship while Roon's sister Yorck was being overhauled. Also in October, FK Friedrich Schrader took command of the ship. The ship went on a major cruise into the Atlantic Ocean from 7 to 28 February 1908 with the other ships of the scouting group. During the cruise, the ships conducted tactical exercises and experimented with using their wireless telegraphy equipment at long distances. They stopped in Vigo, Spain, to replenish their coal for the voyage home. On 5 March, Roon returned to flagship duty, with now Konteradmiral (KAdm—Rear Admiral) Kalau von Hofe back aboard the ship.

Another Atlantic cruise followed in July and August; this time, the cruise was made in company with the battleship squadrons of the High Seas Fleet. Prince Heinrich, the fleet commander, had pressed for such a cruise the previous year, arguing that it would prepare the fleet for overseas operations and would break up the monotony of training in German waters, though tensions with Britain over the developing Anglo-German naval arms race were high. The fleet departed Kiel on 17 July, passed through the Kaiser Wilhelm Canal to the North Sea, and continued to the Atlantic. The fleet returned to Germany on 13 August. The autumn maneuvers followed from 27 August to 12 September. On 23 September, KAdm Jacobsen replaced Kalau von Hofe, and the following month FK Georg Scheidt took command of Roon.

The year 1909 saw two more cruises in the Atlantic, the first in February with just the ships of I Scouting Group and the second in July and August with the rest of the fleet. On the way back to Germany, the fleet stopped in Spithead, Britain, where it was received by the Royal Navy. KzS Reinhard Koch relieved Jacobsen as the group deputy commander after the annual fleet maneuvers in September 1909 but on 1 October he transferred his flag to Yorck. The next two years passed uneventfully for Roon; apart from the typical training routine, she took part in a naval review for Kaiser Wilhelm II in September 1911, after which she was decommissioned on 22 September.

=== World War I ===
Roon (left) steaming astern of the High Seas Fleet

Following the outbreak of World War I in July 1914, Roon was mobilized for wartime service on 2 August and was initially assigned to II Scouting Group as the flagship of KAdm Gisberth Jasper. The ship's first wartime commander was KzS Johannes von Karpf. A series of reorganizations saw the ship transferred to IV Scouting Group to replace the armored cruiser Blücher and on 25 August IV Scouting Group was renamed III Scouting Group, Roon remaining as flagship. KAdm Hubert von Rebeur-Paschwitz replaced Jasper as the group commander. The following day, Roon and the rest of the group took part in a sortie into the eastern Baltic Sea in a failed attempt to rescue the light cruiser Magdeburg that had run aground in Russian territory. The operation was cancelled on 27 August when Rebeur-Paschwitz received word that Magdeburg had been scuttled to avoid capture by Russian forces.

The group was stationed in the North Sea from 6 September to guard the German coast, interrupted by a short deployment to the Danish Straits from 25 to 26 September after false reports of British warships attempting to pass through prompted the German command to send the cruisers on a patrol there. During their period in the North Sea, the cruisers were sent to escort the minelaying cruisers Nautilus and Albatross and the auxiliary minelayer Kaiser as they laid the "Alpha" defensive minefield in the North Sea. The ships then escorted the main body of the High Seas Fleet during the raid on Yarmouth on 2–3 November.

Roon underway

A month later, on 15–16 December, she participated in the bombardment of Scarborough, Hartlepool and Whitby. Along with the armored cruiser Prinz Heinrich, Roon was assigned to the van of the High Seas Fleet, which was providing distant cover to Rear Admiral Franz von Hipper's battlecruisers while they were conducting the bombardment. During the operation, Roon and her attached destroyers encountered the British screening forces; Roon came in contact with the destroyers HMS Lynx and Unity, but no gunfire was exchanged and the ships turned away. Following reports of British destroyers from Roon as well as from Hamburg, Admiral Friedrich von Ingenohl ordered the High Seas Fleet to disengage and head for Germany.

At this point, Roon and her destroyers became the rearguard for the High Seas Fleet. Roon, by this time joined by the light cruisers Stuttgart and Hamburg, encountered Commander Loftus Jones' destroyers. Jones shadowed Roon for about 45 minutes, at which point Stuttgart and Hamburg were detached to sink their pursuers. Twenty minutes later, Roon signaled the two light cruisers and ordered them to abandon the pursuit and retreat along with the rest of the High Seas Fleet. In the meantime, Vice Admiral David Beatty received word of Roon's location, and in an attempt to intercept the German cruisers, detached the battlecruiser HMS New Zealand to hunt the German ships down, while his other three battlecruisers followed from a distance. While still pursuing the retreating Germans, Beatty had become aware that the German battlecruisers were shelling Hartlepool, so he decided to break off the pursuit of Roon and turn towards the German battlecruisers.

==== Operations in the Baltic ====
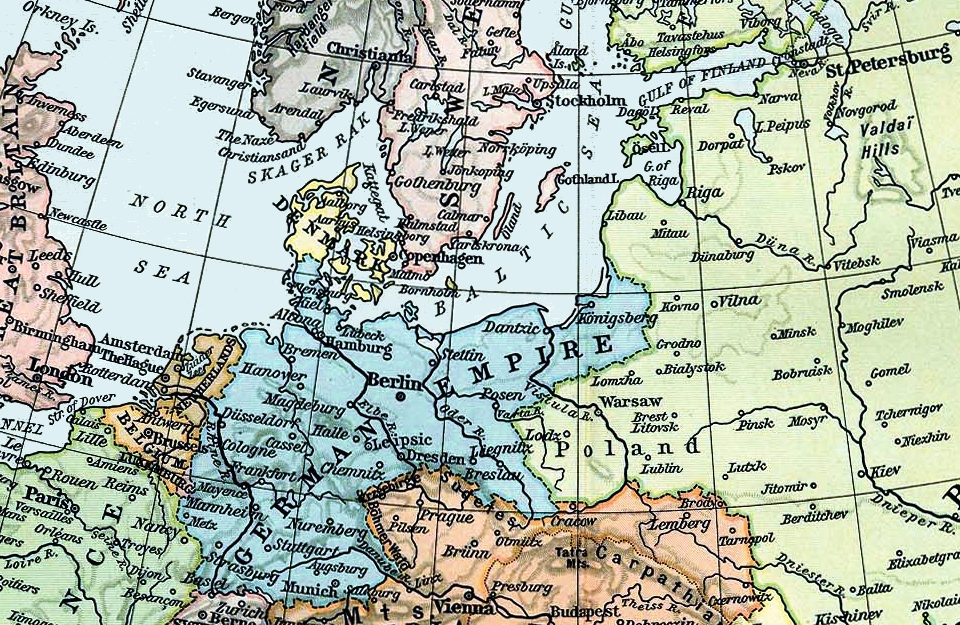
Map of the North and Baltic Seas in 1911

The German naval command decided that because Roon and the other armored cruisers of III Scouting Group were slow and lacked thick enough armor, they were unsuitable for service in the North Sea where they would risk contact with the powerful British Grand Fleet. Therefore, on 15 April 1915, Roon and the rest of III Scouting Group were transferred to the Baltic, where they would face the significantly weaker Russian Baltic Fleet. The unit was dissolved and Roon and the other vessels were assigned to the Reconnaissance Forces of the Baltic, under the command of KAdm Albert Hopman. At the same time, FK Hans Gygas replaced Karpf, who in turn became the deputy commander of the unit and made Roon his flagship. On 30 April, the ship went into drydock in Kiel for an overhaul, returning to service for the attack on Libau on 7 May. On 11 May, the British submarine E9 spotted Roon and several other ships en route to Libau, which had been recently captured by the German army. E9 fired five torpedoes at the German flotilla, all of which missed; two passed closely astern of Roon. Roon thereafter took part in a series of sorties into the central Baltic as far north as Gotska Sandön on 13–16 May, 23–26 May, 2–6 June, 11–13 June, and 20–22 June.

Karpf transferred to the light cruiser Lübeck while Hopman relocated to Roon since the latter's flagship, the armored cruiser Prinz Adalbert, was under repairs for a torpedo hit. Roon and Lübeck covered a minelaying operation with Albatross on 30 June that lasted through 2 July and resulted in the Battle of Åland Islands. The light cruiser Augsburg and three destroyers were escorting Albatross when they were attacked by the armored cruisers Bayan, Admiral Makarov, and the protected cruisers Bogatyr and Oleg. Augsburg escaped while the destroyers covered the retreat of Albatross, which was severely damaged and forced to seek refuge in neutral Swedish waters. Roon joined Lübeck to relieve the beleaguered German destroyers. Upon arriving at the scene, Roon engaged Bayan, and Lübeck opened fire on Oleg. Shortly thereafter, the Russian cruiser Rurik, along with a destroyer, arrived to reinforce the Russian flotilla. In the following artillery duel, Roon was hit several times, and the German ships were forced to retreat.

Later in July, as the German Army began to push further north from Libau, the naval command reinforced the naval forces in the Baltic to support the advance. The pre-dreadnought battleships of IV Battle Squadron were transferred to the eastern Baltic and its commander, Vizeadmiral (Vice Admiral) Ehrhard Schmidt, was placed in command of the naval forces in the area. In August, the German fleet attempted to clear the Gulf of Riga of Russian naval forces to aid the German Army advancing on the city. Elements of the High Seas Fleet were sent to strengthen the forces attempting to break into the gulf. The Germans made several attempts to force their way into the gulf during the Battle of the Gulf of Riga until reports of British submarines in the area prompted the Germans to call off the operation on 20 August. During these attacks, Roon remained outside the gulf and on 10 August, Roon and Prinz Heinrich shelled Russian positions at Zerel on the Sworbe Peninsula. There were several Russian destroyers anchored off Zerel; the German cruisers caught them by surprise and damaged one of them.

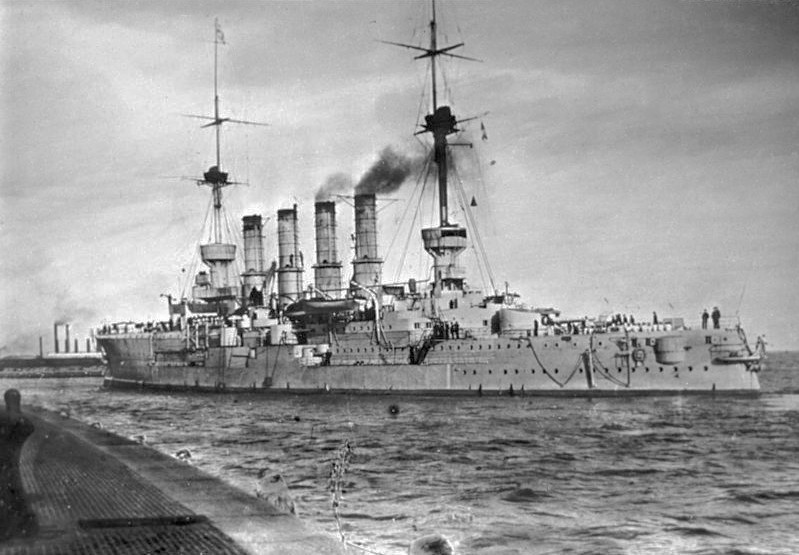
One of the two Roon-class cruisers

On 9 September, Hopman returned to Prinz Adalbert, allowing Roon to return to Kiel for an overhaul. Work was completed by mid-October and the ship returned to Libau on 18 October. Two days later, Hopman made her his flagship once again. The loss of Prinz Adalbert three days later to a British submarine convinced the German command that the threat of underwater weapons was too serious to continue to operate older vessels with insufficient protection, including Roon. Accordingly, on 15 January 1916, Hopman hauled down his flag, and two days later the ship left Libau to return to Kiel, where she was decommissioned on 4 February.

==== Fate ====
In November 1916, Roon was disarmed and converted into a training and accommodation ship. Stationed at Kiel, she served in this capacity until 1918. The German Navy had previously experimented with seaplane carriers, including the conversion of the old light cruiser Stuttgart early in 1918 for service with the fleet. Stuttgart could carry only two aircraft, which was deemed insufficient for fleet support. As a result, plans were drawn up to convert Roon into a seaplane carrier, with a capacity for four aircraft. The ship's main battery would have been removed and replaced with six 15 cm guns and six 8.8 cm anti-aircraft guns; the large hangar for the seaplanes was to have been installed aft of the main superstructure. The plan did not come to fruition, primarily because the German Navy relied on zeppelins for aerial reconnaissance, not seaplanes. Roon was struck from the naval register on 25 November 1920 and scrapped the following year in Kiel-Nordmole.
