= Russian cruiser Pallada (1906) =

Russian Bayan-class cruiser

Coordinates: 59.6083°N 22.8167°E

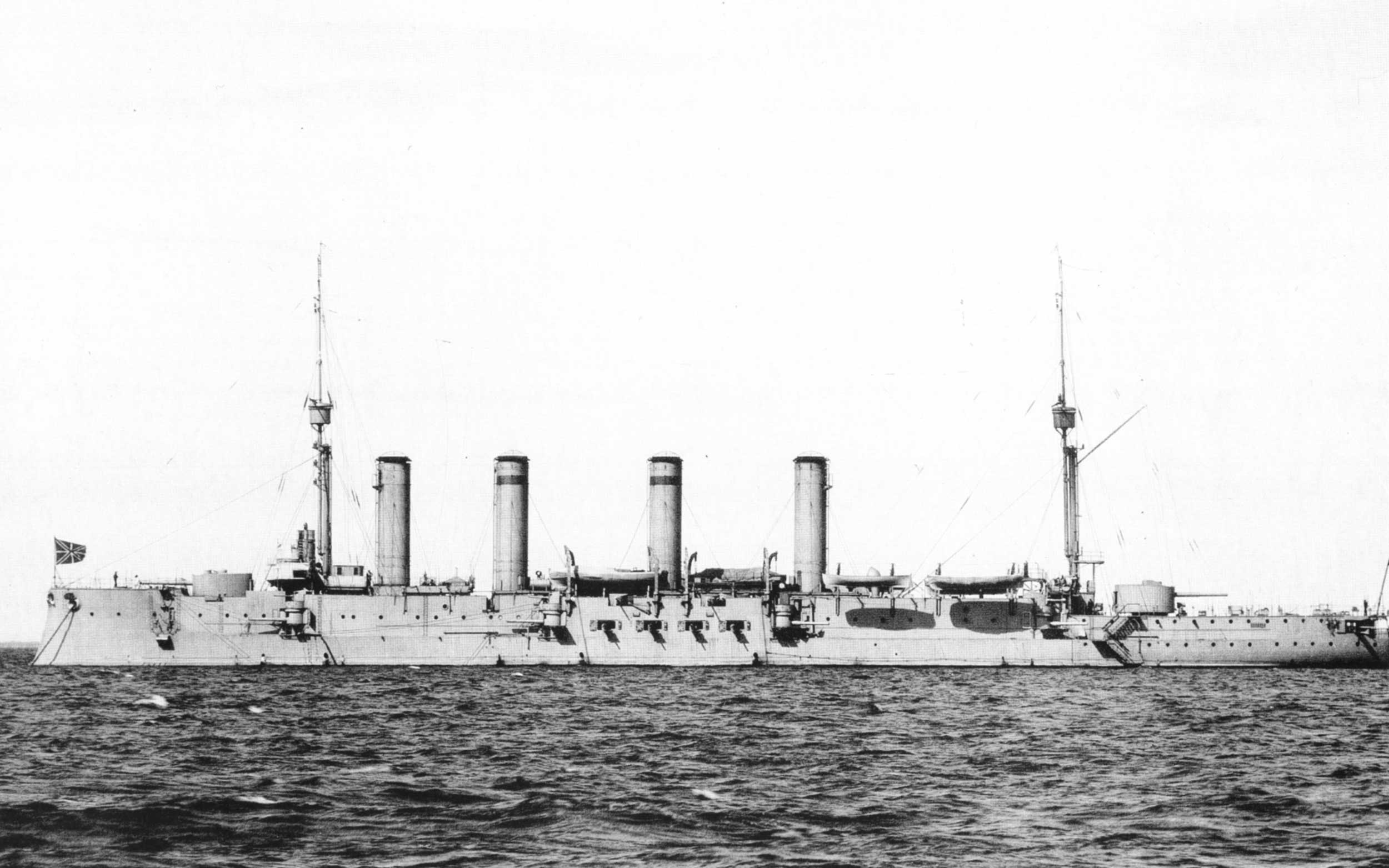
- Pallada at anchor

History

Russian Empire
- Name: Pallada
- Namesake: Pallas Athena
- Builder: Admiralty Shipyard, Saint Petersburg, Russia
- Laid down: August 1905 (Note: All dates used in this article are New Style)
- Launched: 10 November 1906
- Completed: 21 February 1911
- Fate: Sunk, 11 October 1914

General characteristics
- Class & type: Bayan-class armored cruiser
- Displacement: 7,750 long tons (7,874 t) standard
- Length: 449.6 ft (137.0 m)
- Beam: 57 ft 6 in (17.5 m)
- Draught: 22 ft (6.7 m)
- Installed power: 16,500 ihp (12,300 kW); 26 Belleville boilers
- Propulsion: 2 shafts; 2 VTE steam engines
- Speed: 21 knots (39 km/h; 24 mph)
- Complement: 568 (597 at sinking)
- Armament: 2 × 1 - 203 mm (8 in) guns; 8 × 1 - 152 mm (6 in) guns; 20 × 1 - 75 mm (3.0 in) guns; 4 × 1 - 47 mm (1.9 in) guns; 2 × 15 in (381 mm) torpedo tubes
- Armour: Krupp armor; Waterline belt: 90–175 mm (3.5–6.9 in); Deck: 50 mm (2.0 in); Gun turrets: 132 mm (5.2 in); Casemates: 60 mm (2.4 in); Conning tower: 136 mm (5.4 in)

Pallada (Russian: Паллада) was the last of the four Bayan-class armored cruisers built for the Imperial Russian Navy in the first decade of the 20th century. She was assigned to the Baltic Fleet during World War I where she captured codebooks from the German cruiser Magdeburg that had run aground during the first month of the war. The ship was torpedoed by a German submarine in October 1914 and exploded; none of the crew survived. Pallada was the first warship lost by the Russians during the war.

== Design and description ==
Pallada was 449.6 feet (137.0 m) long overall. She had a maximum beam of 57.5 feet (17.5 m), a draught of 26 feet (7.9 m) and displaced 7,750 long tons (7,870 t). The ship had a crew of 568 officers and men. Pallada was named in honour of the earlier Russian cruiser captured by the Japanese during the Russo-Japanese War. Both ships were named for the Greek goddess, Pallas Athena.

The ship had two vertical triple-expansion steam engines with a designed total of 16,500 indicated horsepower (12,304 kW), but they developed 19,320 indicated horsepower (14,410 kW) on sea trials and drove the ship to a maximum speed of 22.55 knots (41.76 km/h; 25.95 mph). Steam for the engines was provided by 26 Belleville boilers. She could carry a maximum of 1,100 long tons (1,118 t) of coal, although her range is unknown.

Pallada's main armament consisted of two 8-inch (203 mm) 45-calibre guns in single turrets fore and aft. Her eight 6-inch (152 mm) gun were mounted in casemates on the sides of the ship's hull. Anti-torpedo boat defense was provided by 20 75-millimetre (3.0 in) 50-calibre guns; eight of these were mounted in casemates on the side of the hull and in the superstructure. The remaining guns were located above the six-inch gun casemates in pivot mounts with gun shields. Pallada also mounted four 47-millimetre (1.9 in) Hotchkiss guns. The ship also had two submerged 15-inch (381 mm) torpedo tubes, one mounted on each broadside.

The ship used Krupp armour throughout. Her waterline belt was 190 millimetres (7.5 in) thick over her machinery spaces. Fore and aft, it reduced to 90 millimetres (3.5 in). The upper belt and the casemates were 60 millimetres (2.4 in) thick. The armour deck was 50 millimetres (2 in) thick; over the central battery it was a single plate, but elsewhere it consisted of a 30-millimetre (1.2 in) plate over two 10-millimetre (0.39 in) plates. The gun turrets were protected by 132 millimetres (5.2 in) of armour and the conning tower had walls 136 millimetres (5.4 in) thick.

== Service ==
Pallada was built by the Admiralty Shipyard in Saint Petersburg. Construction began on 24 June 1905, although she was not formally laid down until August, and the ship was launched on 10 November 1906. Pallada was completed in February 1911. She spent her entire career with the Baltic Fleet.

On 26 August 1914, during the first month of World War I, the German light cruiser Magdeburg ran aground near the island of Odensholm in the Gulf of Finland. Her escort, the V25-class torpedo boat SMS V-26, failed to pull her off and rescued part of the crew before Pallada and the protected cruiser Bogatyr appeared and opened fire. The Germans blew up the front part of the ship, but failed to demolish the rest of the ship. They failed to destroy their naval codebooks, which were discovered by the Russians. A copy was later given to the British where it proved enormously helpful to Room 40 in reading German Wireless traffic for much of the war. Together with the armoured cruiser Rurik, Pallada unsuccessfully searched for German ships between Bornholm and Danzig on the night of 27 August. Less than two months later, on 11 October, Pallada was torpedoed by the German submarine SM U-26 and blew up with the loss of all hands, the first Russian warship sunk during the war.

== Wreck ==
The wreck of Pallada was discovered by a diver group outside Hanko near the coast of Finland in 2000, but this was only revealed 2012. The ship is lying in three pieces, all upside-down, at a depth of about 40 to 50 metres (130 to 160 ft). The wreck is now covered in silt, but a number of details such as a large wooden emblem of the Russian double-headed eagle are still intact. One of the eight-inch turrets is resting on the seafloor next to the bow section. It was reported in 2013 that the previously largely untouched wreck had been looted.
