= SMS Magdeburg =

Light cruiser of the German Imperial Navy

Coordinates: 59°18′N 23°21′E

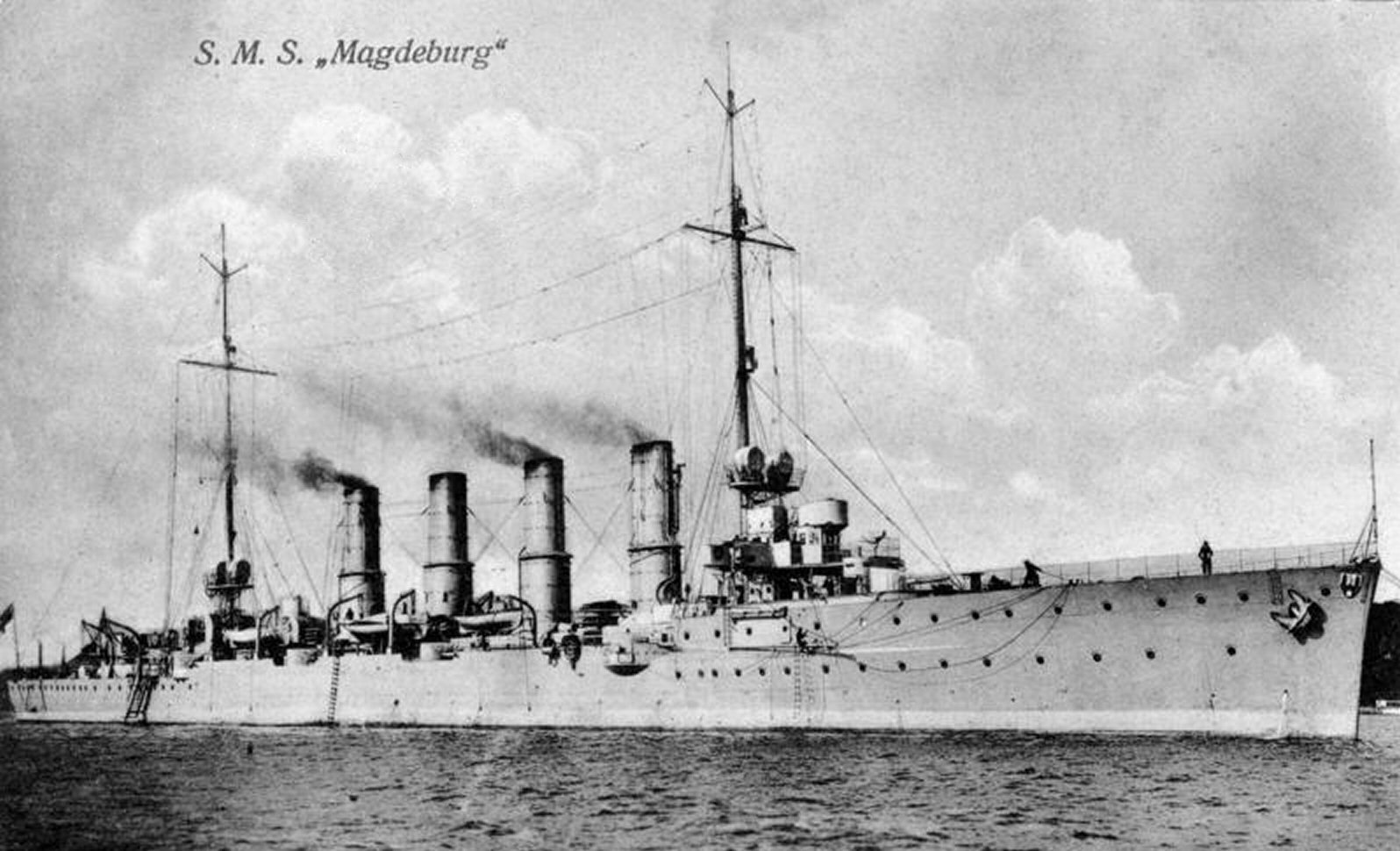
- Magdeburg in 1911

History

German Empire
- Name: Magdeburg
- Namesake: Magdeburg
- Builder: AG Weser, Bremen
- Laid down: 1910
- Launched: 13 May 1911
- Commissioned: 20 August 1912
- Fate: Wrecked on 26 August 1914 in the Gulf of Finland

General characteristics
- Class & type: Magdeburg-class cruiser
- Displacement: Normal: 4,535 t (4,463 long tons); Full load: 4,570 t (4,500 long tons)
- Length: 138.7 m (455 ft 1 in)
- Beam: 13.5 m (44 ft 3 in)
- Draft: 4.4 m (14 ft 5 in)
- Installed power: 16 × water-tube boilers; 25,000 shp (19,000 kW)
- Propulsion: 3 × steam turbines; 3 × screw propellers
- Speed: 27.6 knots (51.1 km/h; 31.8 mph)
- Range: 5,820 nmi (10,780 km; 6,700 mi) at 12 knots (22 km/h; 14 mph)
- Complement: 18 officers; 336 enlisted
- Armament: 12 × 10.5 cm (4.1 in) SK L/45 guns; 120 mines; 2 × 50 cm (19.7 in) torpedo tubes
- Armor: Belt: 60 mm (2.4 in); Deck: 60 mm; Conning tower: 100 mm (3.9 in)

SMS Magdeburg ("His Majesty's Ship Magdeburg") (Note: "SMS" stands for "Seiner Majestät Schiff" (German: His Majesty's Ship).) was the lead ship of the Magdeburg class of light cruisers in the German Kaiserliche Marine (Imperial Navy). Her class included three other ships: Breslau, Strassburg, and Stralsund. Magdeburg was built at the AG Weser shipyard in Bremen from 1910 to August 1912, when she was commissioned into the High Seas Fleet. The ship was armed with a main battery of twelve 10.5 cm SK L/45 guns and had a top speed of 27.5 knots (50.9 km/h; 31.6 mph). Magdeburg was used as a torpedo test ship after her commissioning until the outbreak of World War I in August 1914, when she was brought to active service and deployed to the Baltic.

In the Baltic, Magdeburg fired the first shots of the war against the Russians on 2 August, when she shelled the port of Libau. She participated in a series of bombardments of Russian positions until late August. On the 26th, she participated in a sweep of the entrance to the Gulf of Finland; while steaming off the Estonian coast, she ran aground off the island of Odensholm and could not be freed. A pair of Russian cruisers appeared and seized the ship. Fifteen crew members were killed in the brief engagement. They recovered three intact German code books, one of which they passed to the British. The ability to decrypt German wireless signals provided the British with the ability to ambush German units on several occasions during the war, including the Battle of Jutland. The Russians partially scrapped Magdeburg while she remained grounded before completely destroying the wreck.

== Design ==
Plan and profile of the Magdeburg class

The Magdeburg-class cruisers were designed in response to the development of the British Invincible-class battlecruisers, which were faster than all existing German light cruisers. As a result, speed of the new ships had to be increased. To accomplish this, more powerful engines were fitted and their hulls were lengthened to improve their hydrodynamic efficiency. These changes increased top speed from 25.5 to 27 knots (47.2 to 50.0 km/h; 29.3 to 31.1 mph) over the preceding Kolberg-class cruisers. To save weight, longitudinal framing was adopted for the first time in a major German warship design. In addition, the Magdeburgs were the first cruisers to carry belt armor, which was necessitated by the adoption of more powerful 6-inch (150 mm) guns in the latest British cruisers.

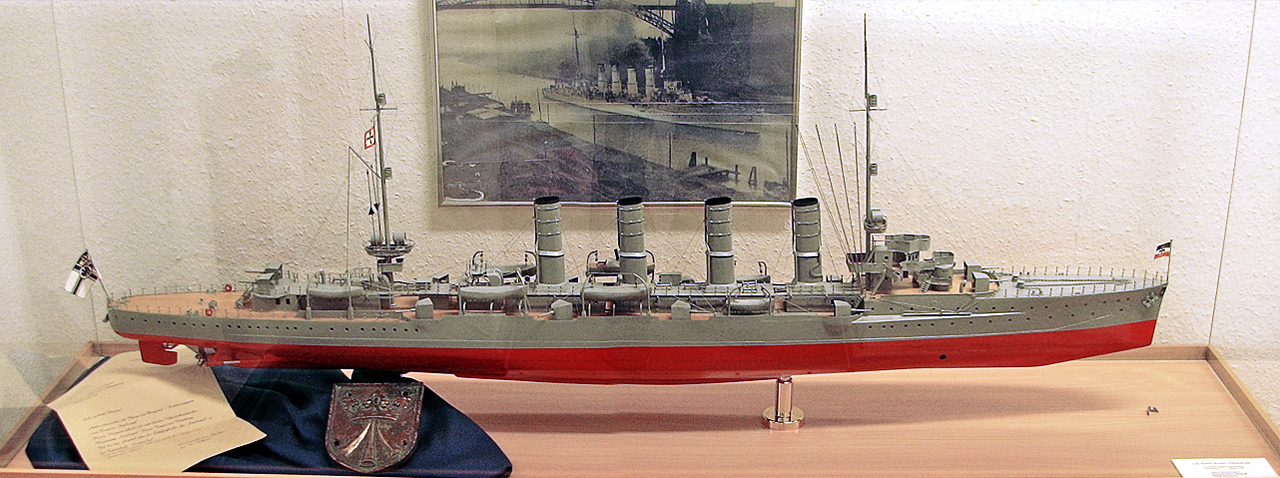
Model of a Magdeburg-class cruiser in the Marinemuseum in Dänholm

Magdeburg was 138.7 meters (455 ft 1 in) long overall and had a beam of 13.5 m (44 ft 3 in) and a draft of 4.4 m (14 ft 5 in) forward. She displaced 4,535 t (4,463 long tons) normally and up to 4,570 t (4,500 long tons) at full load. The ship had a short forecastle deck and a minimal superstructure that consisted primarily of a conning tower located on the forecastle. She was fitted with two pole masts with platforms for searchlights. Magdeburg had a crew of 18 officers and 336 enlisted men.

Her propulsion system consisted of three sets of Bergmann steam turbines driving three screw propellers. They were designed to give 25,000 shaft horsepower (19,000 kW), but reached 29,904 shp (22,299 kW) in service. These were powered by sixteen coal-fired Marine-type water-tube boilers, although they were later altered to use fuel oil that was sprayed on the coal to increase its burn rate. The boilers were vented through four funnels located amidships. These gave the ship a top speed of 27.6 knots (51.1 km/h; 31.8 mph). Magdeburg carried 1,200 t (1,181 long tons) of coal, and an additional 106 t (104 long tons) of oil that gave her a range of approximately 5,820 nautical miles (10,780 km; 6,700 mi) at 12 knots (22 km/h; 14 mph).

The ship was armed with a main battery of twelve 10.5 cm (4.1 in) SK L/45 guns in single pedestal mounts. Two were placed side by side forward on the forecastle, eight were located on the broadside, four on either side, and two were side by side aft. The guns had a maximum elevation of 30 degrees, which allowed them to engage targets out to 12,700 m (13,900 yd). They were supplied with 1,800 rounds of ammunition, for 150 shells per gun. She was also equipped with a pair of 50 cm (19.7 in) torpedo tubes with five torpedoes; the tubes were submerged in the hull on the broadside. She could also carry 120 mines.

Magdeburg was protected by a waterline armor belt and a curved armor deck. The deck was flat across most of the hull, but angled downward at the sides and connected to the bottom edge of the belt. The belt and deck were both 60 mm (2.4 in) thick. The conning tower had 100 mm (3.9 in) thick sides.

== Service history ==
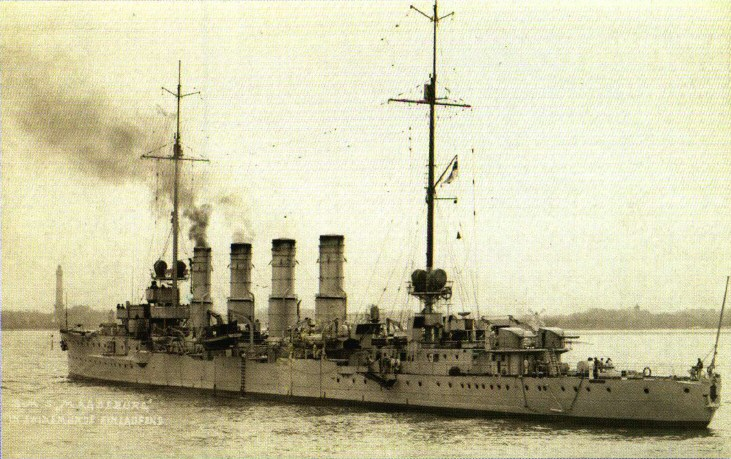
Magdeburg in Swinemünde in 1912

Magdeburg was ordered under the contract name "Ersatz Bussard"; (Note: German warships were ordered under provisional names. Additions to the fleet were given a single letter; ships intended to replace older or lost vessels were ordered as "Ersatz (name of the ship to be replaced)".) the order was awarded to the AG Weser shipyard in Bremen in December 1909. She was laid down in April 1910 and launched on 13 May 1911, and during the ceremony, she was christened by the mayor of her namesake city. After completing fitting-out work, she began a short period of builder's trials on 12 August 1912 before being commissioned into the High Seas Fleet eight days later, under the command of Fregattenkapitän (FK—Frigate Captain) Heinrich Rohardt. The ship conducted these initial tests without her forward funnel installed. After completing her initial sea trials, Magdeburg was used as a torpedo test ship on 1 December, replacing the light cruiser Augsburg in that role. Later that year, she embarked on a cruise in the Baltic Sea with other vessels organized into a training squadron.

Another such cruise took place in early April 1913, and in June, she joined the fleet for its annual cruise to Norwegian waters. In August, Magdeburg went on another fleet cruise into the central Atlantic, steaming as far south as Tenerife in the Canary Islands. During the cruise, she participated in experiments with wireless telegraphy. Following the fleet's return to home waters, the annual large-scale fleet maneuvers took place in the North Sea. Magdeburg thereafter went to Danzig for an overhaul that lasted from mid-September to late October. She resumed torpedo test duties on 26 October, but again joined the fleet for exercises in the Kattegat later that year, after which she went on another training cruise in the Baltic in December. The year 1914 began with exercises with the training squadron. As Europe drifted toward war during the July Crisis, Magdeburg was ordered to patrol the Bay of Kiel to help secure the port's defenses. During a patrol on 27 July, she encountered the French dreadnought battleships France and Jean Bart, which had taken the French President Raymond Poincaré on a visit to Russia.

=== World War I ===
Following the outbreak of World War I at the end of July, she was assigned to the Coastal Defense Division in the Baltic Sea, under the command of Rear Admiral Robert Mischke. An Offensiv Streitkraft (Offensive Force) was created with Magdeburg, Augsburg, and the torpedo boats V25, V26, and V186 for operations against Russian forces in the area. The ships were sent to Neufahrwassar on 30 July. Magdeburg fired the first shots of the war with Russia on 2 August when she shelled the Russian port of Libau while Augsburg laid a minefield outside what had been Russia's forward naval base. The Russians had in fact already left Libau, which was seized by the German Army. The minefield laid by Augsburg was poorly marked and hindered German operations more than Russian efforts. From 6 to 8 August, Magdeburg patrolled off the southern entrance to the Gulf of Riga, to the north of Libau. She then joined the rest of the Coastal Defense Division, which was sent north to attack Russian positions in Finland that lasted from 9 to 15 August. During the attacks, Magdeburg shelled the Ristna Lighthouse in Dagerort. She also attacked the Bengtskär Lighthouse and a signal station at Pistna.

On 17 August, Magdeburg, Augsburg, and three torpedo boats, sortied to escort the minelayer Deutschland, and the next day, they encountered a pair of powerful Russian armored cruisers, Admiral Makarov and Gromoboi. The Russian commander, under the mistaken assumption that the German armored cruisers Roon and Prinz Heinrich were present, did not attack and both forces and withdrew. After arriving in Danzig on 20 August, the Offensiv Streitkraft was reorganized as the Verband des "Detachierten Admirals" (Unit of the Detached Admiral). Prince Heinrich, the overall commander of the Baltic naval forces, replaced Mischke with Konteradmiral (Rear Admiral) Ehler Behring. The new commander immediately began planning to make a sortie toward Gotland to search for Russian vessels. Behring ordered the operation for 26 August to sweep for Russian reconnaissance forces in the entrance to the Gulf of Finland; Magdeburg was also to bombard the signal station at Odensholm on the Estonian coast.

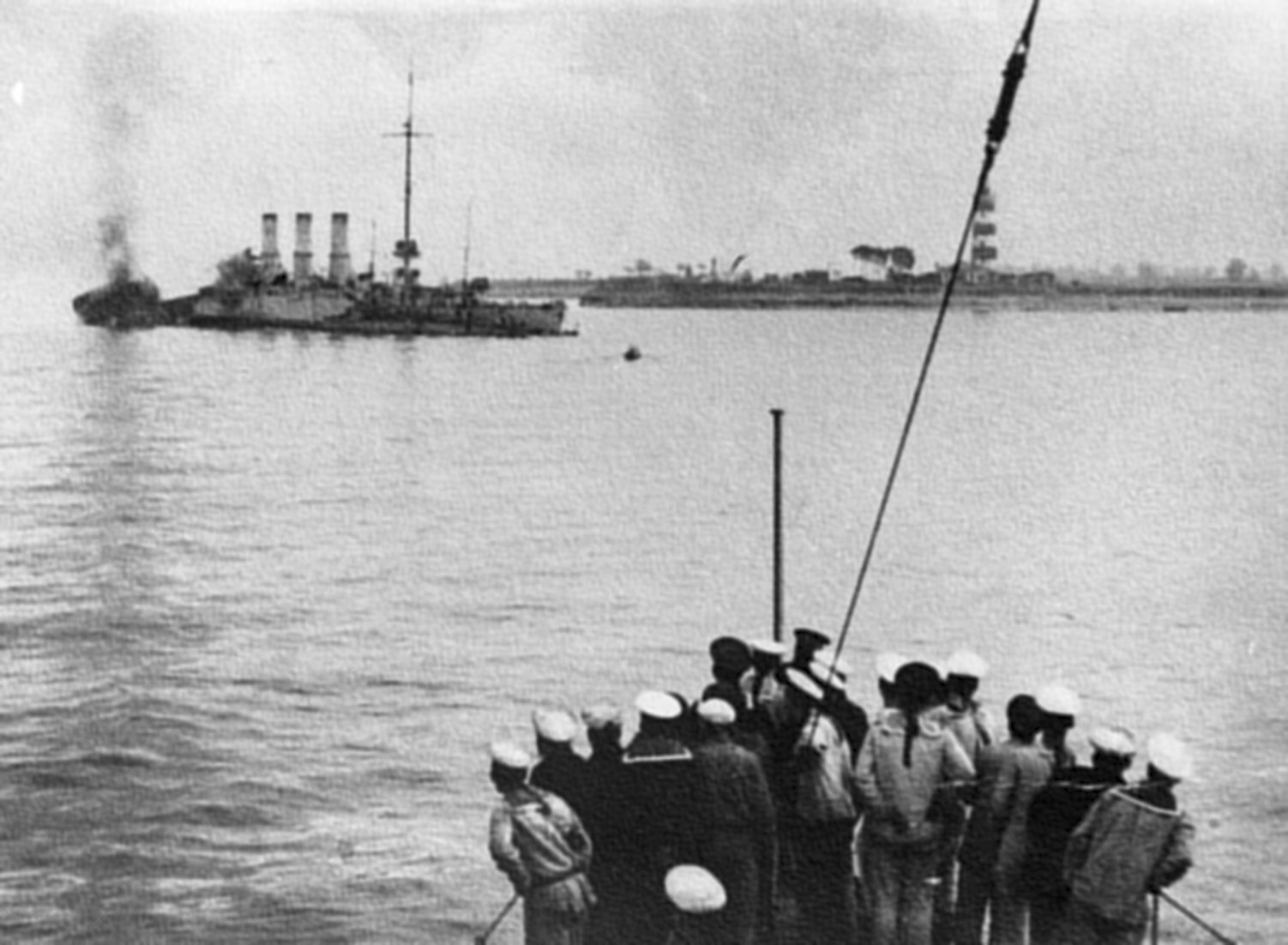
Magdeburg aground off Odensholm

Magdeburg got underway the previous day to arrive in the area at the prescribed time. She encountered heavy fog in the early hours of 26 August while steaming at a speed of 15 knots (28 km/h; 17 mph), and at 01:13, she ran aground near the lighthouse at Odensholm. The ship's double bottom was badly damaged and she was unable to free herself. The crew attempted to lighten the ship by throwing equipment overboard, but the vessel remained hard aground. The torpedo boat V26 arrived at around 08:30 and attempted to pull her free but was unable to do so. She therefore began taking off part of Magdeburg's crew in preparation to abandon the wreck. Since the cruiser had gone ashore near the lighthouse, which was one of her targets for the planned bombardment, she destroyed it with gunfire in spite of her predicament.

While the evacuation was going on, the Russian cruisers Bogatyr and Pallada appeared at around 09:00, having been alerted to the situation by the signal station that Magdeburg had been unable to destroy. On reaching the area, they opened fire on the stranded cruiser. The Germans destroyed the forward section of the ship, but could not complete her destruction before the Russians reached the ship. Fifteen crew members from Magdeburg were killed in the attack, and the ship's captain and his adjutant remained aboard and were captured by the Russians; they remained in a Russian prisoner of war camp until March 1918, when they were able to escape and return to Germany. The German code books were also not destroyed; the Russians were able to recover three of the books along with the current encryption key. They passed one copy to the British Royal Navy via a pair of Russian couriers on 13 October. The Russian Navy partially scrapped the ship in situ and eventually destroyed the wreck.

The capture of the code books proved to provide a significant advantage for the Royal Navy. The Admiralty had recently created a deciphering department known as Room 40 to process intercepted German wireless signals. With the code books and cipher key, the British were able to track the movements of most German warships; this information could be passed on to Admiral John Jellicoe, the commander of the Grand Fleet. This allowed the British to ambush parts of or the entire German fleet on several occasions, most successfully at the Battles of Dogger Bank in January 1915 and Jutland in May 1916.
