= SM U-26 =

World War I German Navy submarine

Coordinates: 59°40′N 25°50′E

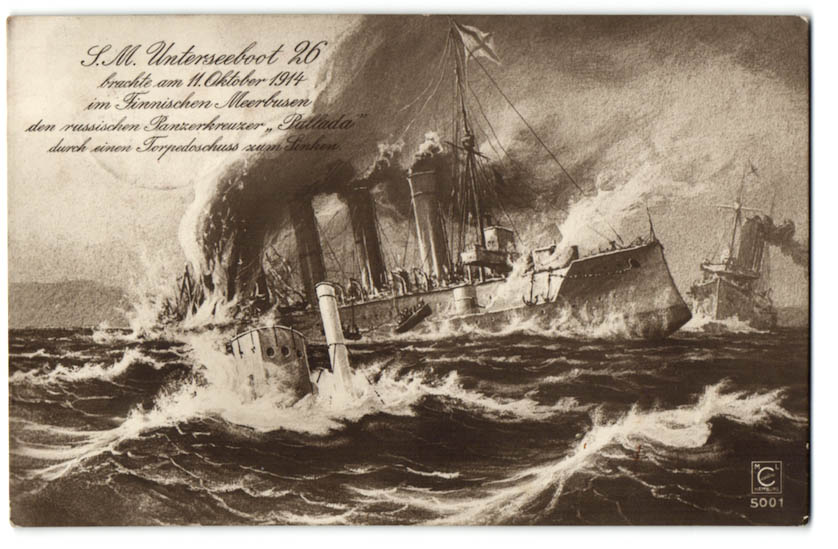
- SM U-26 sinks the Russian armoured cruiser Pallada with a torpedo on 11 October 1914 in the Gulf of Finland.

History

German Empire
- Name: U-26
- Ordered: 18 March 1911
- Builder: Germaniawerft, Kiel
- Yard number: 180
- Laid down: 31 May 1912
- Launched: 16 October 1913
- Commissioned: 20 May 1914
- Fate: Sunk by a Russian mine in Gulf of Finland on 31 August or 4 September 1915 (all hands lost).

General characteristics Ocean-going diesel submarine
- Class & type: Type U 23 submarine
- Displacement: 669 t (658 long tons) surfaced; 864 t (850 long tons) submerged
- Length: 64.70 m (212.3 ft)
- Beam: 6.32 m (20 ft 9 in)
- Draught: 3.45 m (11 ft 4 in)
- Propulsion: 2 shafts; 2 × Germania 6-cylinder two stroke diesel motors with 1,800 PS (1,320 kW; 1,780 shp); 2 × SSW double Motordynamos with 1,200 PS (880 kW; 1,180 shp); 450rpm surfaced; 330 rpm submerged
- Speed: 16.7 knots (30.9 km/h; 19.2 mph) surfaced; 10.3 knots (19.1 km/h; 11.9 mph) submerged
- Range: 9,910 nmi (18,350 km; 11,400 mi) at 8 knots (15 km/h; 9.2 mph) surfaced; 85 nmi (157 km; 98 mi) at 5 knots (9.3 km/h; 5.8 mph) submerged
- Test depth: about 50 m (160 ft)
- Boats & landing craft carried: 1 dingi
- Complement: 4 officers, 31 men
- Armament: 4 × 50 cm (19.7 in) torpedo tubes (2 each bow and stern); 6 torpedoes; 1 × 8.8 cm (3.5 in) SK L/30 gun

Service record
- Part of: IV Flotilla; 1 August 1914 – Unknown end; Baltic Flotilla; Unknown start – 30 September 1915
- Commanders: Kptlt. Egewolf Freiherr von Berckheim; 1 August – 17 December 1914 &; 13 January – 30 September 1915
- Operations: 1 patrol
- Victories: 3 merchant ships sunk (3,700 GRT); 2 warships sunk (11,375 tons)

SM U-26 was one of the 329 submarines serving in the Imperial German Navy (Kaiserliche Marine) in World War I.

U-26 was engaged in the submarine war in the Baltic Sea. On 11 October 1914, she sank the cruiser Pallada, inflicting the first loss of the war on the Russian Navy.

== Fate ==
The boat did not return from sea in August 1915, and is assumed to have struck a mine off the coast of Finland, being lost with its entire crew of 30.

== Wreck discovered ==
The boat was found in the western Gulf of Finland as reported by the Finnish newspaper Helsingin Sanomat in May 2014.

== Summary of raiding history ==
Date	Name	Nationality	Tonnage (Note: Merchant ship tonnages are in gross register tons. Military vessels are listed by tons displacement.)	Fate
11 October 1914	Pallada	Imperial Russian Navy	7,775	Sunk
23 April 1915	Fråck	Russian Empire	849	Sunk
4 June 1915	Yenisei	Imperial Russian Navy	3,600	Sunk
25 August 1915	Petshora	Imperial Russian Navy	1,982	Sunk
30 August 1915	Zemlya	Russian Empire	869	Sunk

== Bibliography ==
- Gröner, Erich; Jung, Dieter; Maass, Martin (1991). U-boats and Mine Warfare Vessels. German Warships 1815–1945. Vol. 2. Translated by Thomas, Keith; Magowan, Rachel. London: Conway Maritime Press. ISBN 0-85177-593-4.
