= Russian cruiser Admiral Makarov =

Russian Bayan-class cruiser

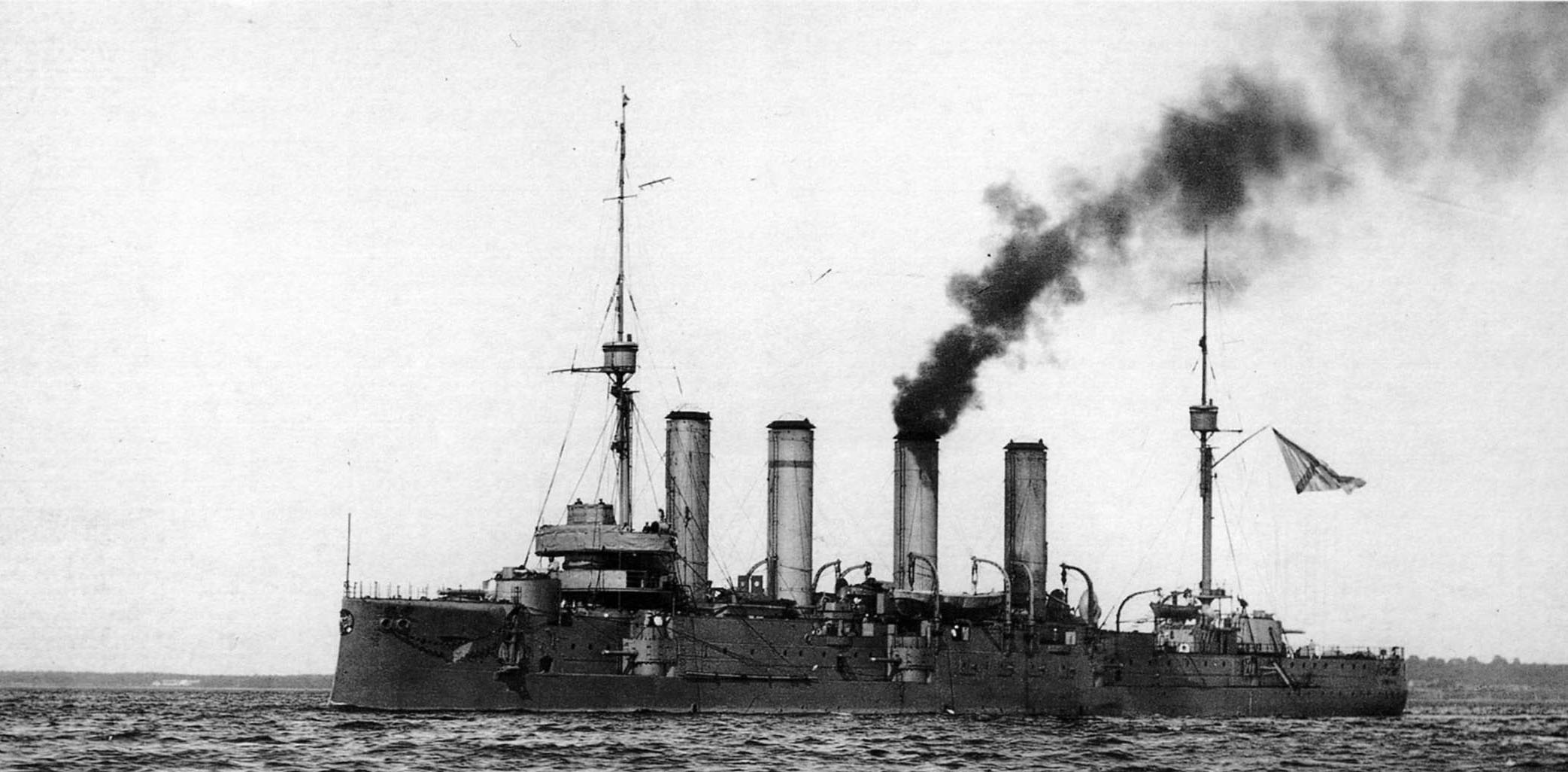
- Admiral Makarov in 1916

History

Russian Empire
- Name: Admiral Makarov
- Namesake: Admiral Stepan Makarov
- Builder: Forges et Chantiers de la Méditerranée, La Seyne-sur-Mer, France
- Laid down: April 1905 (Note: All dates used in this article are New Style)
- Launched: 28 May 1906
- Completed: April 1908
- Fate: Sold for scrap, 1922

General characteristics
- Class & type: Bayan-class armoured cruiser
- Displacement: 7,750 long tons (7,874 t) standard
- Length: 449.6 ft (137.0 m)
- Beam: 57 ft 6 in (17.5 m)
- Draught: 22 ft (6.7 m)
- Installed power: 16,500 ihp (12,300 kW)
- Propulsion: 2 shafts; 2 VTE steam engines; 26 Belleville boilers
- Speed: 21 knots (39 km/h; 24 mph)
- Complement: 568
- Armament: 2 × 1 – 203 mm (8 in) guns; 8 × 1 – 152 mm (6 in) guns; 20 × 1 – 75 mm (3.0 in) guns; 4 × 1 – 47 mm (1.9 in) guns; 2 × 18 in (457 mm) torpedo tubes
- Armour: Krupp armor; Waterline belt: 90–175 mm (3.5–6.9 in); Deck: 50 mm (2.0 in); Gun turrets: 132 mm (5.2 in); Casemates: 60 mm (2.4 in); Conning tower: 136 mm (5.4 in)

Admiral Makarov was the second of the four Bayan-class armoured cruisers built for the Imperial Russian Navy during the mid-1900s. While initially assigned to the Baltic Fleet, the ship was detached to the Mediterranean several times before the start of World War I in 1914. She was modified to lay mines shortly after the war began. Admiral Makarov laid mines herself during the war and provided cover for other ships laying minefields. The ship fought several inconclusive battles with German ships during the war, including the Battle of Åland Islands in mid–1915. She also defended Moon Sound during the German invasion of the Estonian islands in late 1917. Admiral Makarov was decommissioned in 1918 and sold for scrap in 1922.

== Design and description ==
Admiral Makarov was 449.6 feet (137.0 m) long overall. She had a maximum beam of 57.5 feet (17.5 m), a draught of 22 feet (6.7 m) and displaced 7,750 long tons (7,870 t). The ship had a crew of 568 officers and men. Admiral Makarov was named in honour of Admiral Stepan Makarov.

The ship had two vertical triple-expansion steam engines with a designed total of 16,500 indicated horsepower (12,304 kW) intended to propel the cruiser at 21 knots (39 km/h; 24 mph). However, during sea trials, they developed 19,320 indicated horsepower (14,410 kW) and drove the ship to a maximum speed of 22.55 knots (41.76 km/h; 25.95 mph). Steam for the engines was provided by 26 Belleville boilers. She could carry a maximum of 1,100 long tons (1,118 t) of coal, although her range is unknown.

Admiral Makarov's main armament consisted of two 8-inch (203 mm) 45-calibre guns in single-gun turrets fore and aft. Her eight 6-inch (152 mm) guns were mounted in casemates on the sides of the ship's hull. Anti-torpedo boat defense was provided by twenty 75-millimetre (3.0 in) 50-calibre guns; eight of these were mounted in casemates on the side of the hull and in the superstructure. The remaining guns were located above the six-inch gun casemates in pivot mounts with gun shields. Admiral Makarov also mounted four 47-millimetre (1.9 in) Hotchkiss guns. The ship also had two submerged 18-inch (457 mm) torpedo tubes, one on each broadside.

The ship used Krupp armour throughout. Her waterline belt was 190 millimetres (7.5 in) thick over her machinery spaces. Fore and aft, it reduced to 90 millimetres (3.5 in). The upper belt and the casemates were 60 millimetres (2.4 in) thick. The armour deck was 50 millimetres (2 in) thick; over the central battery it was a single plate, but elsewhere it consisted of a 30-millimetre (1.2 in) plate over two 10-millimetre (0.39 in) plates. The gun turrets were protected by 132 millimetres (5.2 in) of armour and the conning tower had sides 136 millimetres (5.4 in) thick.

== Service ==
Admiral Makarov was built by Forges et Chantiers de la Méditerranée in La Seyne-sur-Mer, France. The ship was laid down in April 1905, and she was launched on 28 May 1906. Admiral Makarov was completed in April 1908. The ship sailed for the Baltic on 27 May and reached Tallinn, Estonia on 11 June where she was assigned to the Baltic Fleet. A few months later, she returned to the Mediterranean and provided assistance to the survivor of the Messina earthquake in December. The ship then rejoined the Baltic Fleet, but she was transferred back to Mediterranean in 1910 where she represented the Russian Empire, together with the battleship Tsesarevich, the armored cruiser Rurik, and the protected cruiser Bogatyr, at the coronation of Nicholas I of Montenegro in August 1910. Admiral Makarov was back in the Baltic during 1911 and she made a port visit to Copenhagen in 1912. The following year, the ship was one of a group of cruisers that visited Brest, France, the Isle of Portland in Great Britain, and Stavanger, Norway.

When World War I began, Admiral Makarov was assigned to the First Cruiser Brigade. On 17 August, the ship, together with the armored cruiser Gromoboi, encountered two German light cruisers and an auxiliary minelayer near the entrance to the Gulf of Finland en route to lay a minefield at the entrance. The Russian commander refused combat because he mistakenly thought that the Germans had two additional armored cruisers with them. Shortly afterward, Admiral Makarov was modified to carry mines. She laid her first mines in early December when she was one of a group of ships that mined the northern and western entrances to the Gulf of Danzig. The following month, she provided cover as other cruisers laid minefields in the western Baltic Sea, near Bornholm and Rügen Islands on the night of 12 January 1915. On 13 February, the ship was en route to cover another minelaying sortie in the Gulf of Danzig, when Rurik ran aground in fog off Fårö Island. She was pulled off despite taking 2,400 long tons (2,400 t) of water aboard, and Admiral Makarov escorted the damaged ship back home. Together with her sister Bayan and two protected cruisers, she fought a brief and inconclusive action with the light cruiser SMS München during the night of 6/7 May while covering a minelaying sortie off Libau.

On 2 July, the ship participated in the Battle of Åland Islands when intercepted and decoded Wireless signals informed the Russians that a small German force was at sea to lay a minefield off Åland. Rear Admiral Mikhail Bakhirev was already at sea with Admiral Makarov, Bayan, Rurik, the protected cruisers Bogatyr and Oleg, and the destroyer Novik en route to bombard Memel. Rurik and Novik got separated from the others in fog, but the rest of the force encountered the light cruiser SMS Augsburg and a number of destroyers escorting the minelayer SMS Albatross. The Russians concentrated on Albatross, which was forced to run aground in Swedish territorial waters, while the faster Augsburg escaped to the south. The Russian cruisers were low on ammunition when they encountered two more German cruisers and broke off the action after exchanging fire.

When the German launched Operation Albion, the invasion of the Estonian islands of Saaremaa (Ösel), Hiiumaa (Dagö) and Muhu (Moon), on 11 October 1917, Admiral Makarov was in Finland, although she was assigned to the naval forces defending the Gulf of Riga. The ship arrived in Moon Sound on 14 October and engaged German destroyers attempting to enter the Sound from the west until ordered to withdraw on 19 October.

The Treaty of Brest-Litovsk required the Soviets to evacuate their base at Helsinki in March 1918 or have the ships based there interned by newly independent Finland even though the Gulf of Finland was still frozen over. Admiral Makarov was among the first group of ships that sailed on 25 March and reached Kronstadt five days later in what became known as the 'Ice Voyage'. She was paid off upon arrival and did not participate in the Russian Civil War. The ship was sold for scrap in 1922 and broken up in Stettin.
