= Battle of Gotland =

1915 naval battle between Germany and Russia during WW1

Coordinates: 60.1167°N 19.9000°E

- Part of World War I
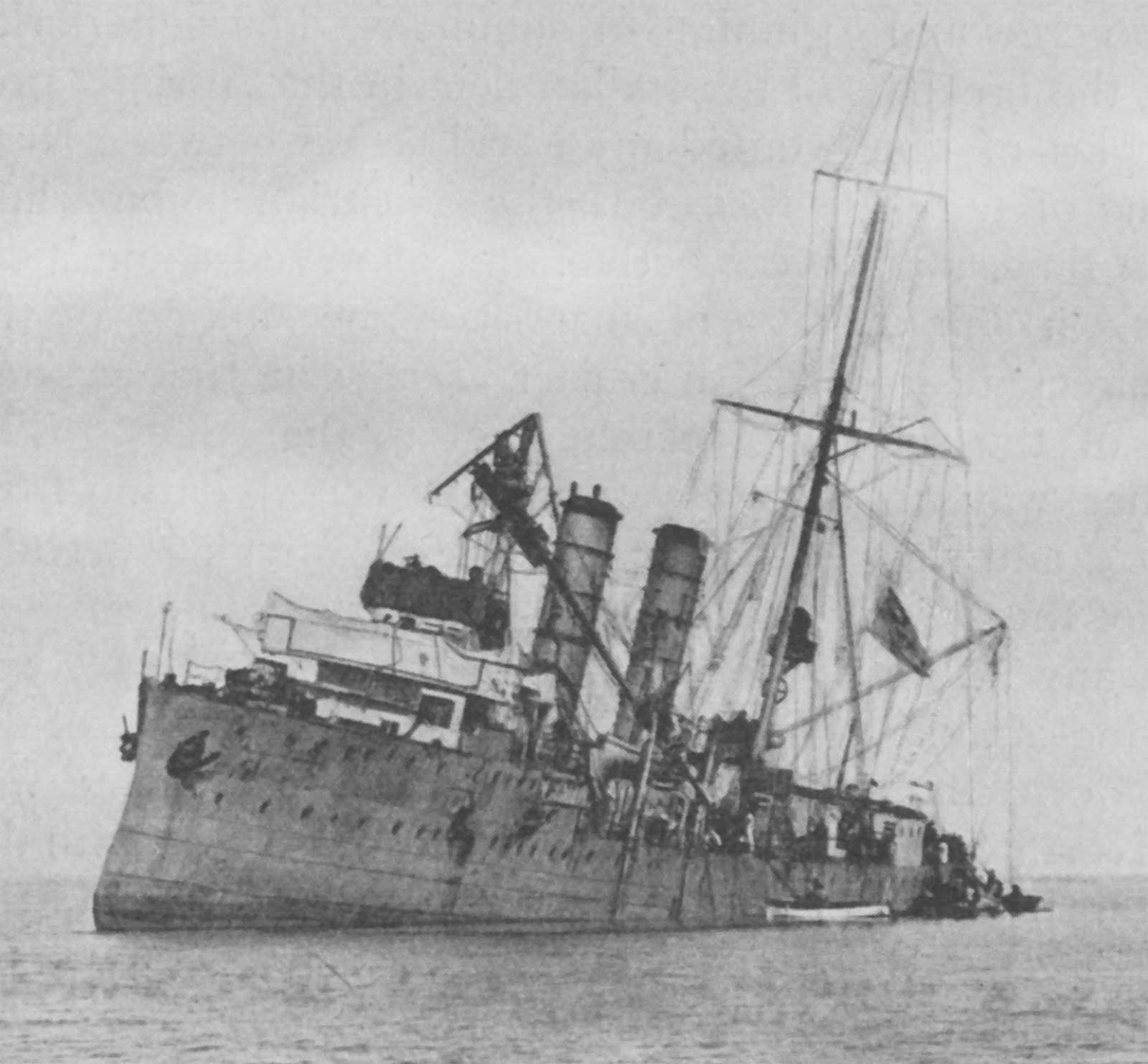
- SMS Albatross after running aground during the battle.
Date	2 July [O.S. 19 June] 1915
Location	off Gotland, Sweden
Result	Anglo-Russian victory

Belligerents
German Empire; Imperial Navy	Russian Empire; Imperial Navy; United Kingdom

Commanders and leaders
(German Empire) Johannes von Karpf	(Russian Empire) Mikhail Bakhirev

Strength
3 armored cruisers 1 cruiser 2 light cruisers 7 torpedo boats	3 armored cruisers 2 light cruisers 1 destroyer 1 submarine

Casualties and losses
2 armored cruisers damaged 1 cruiser grounded 27 dead and 49 wounded	Minor damages

The Battle of Gotland, which occurred in July 1915, was a naval battle of World War I between the German Empire and the Russian Empire, assisted by a submarine of the British Baltic Flotilla. It took place in the Baltic Sea off the shores of Gotland, Sweden, a country neutral in World War I.

== The battle ==
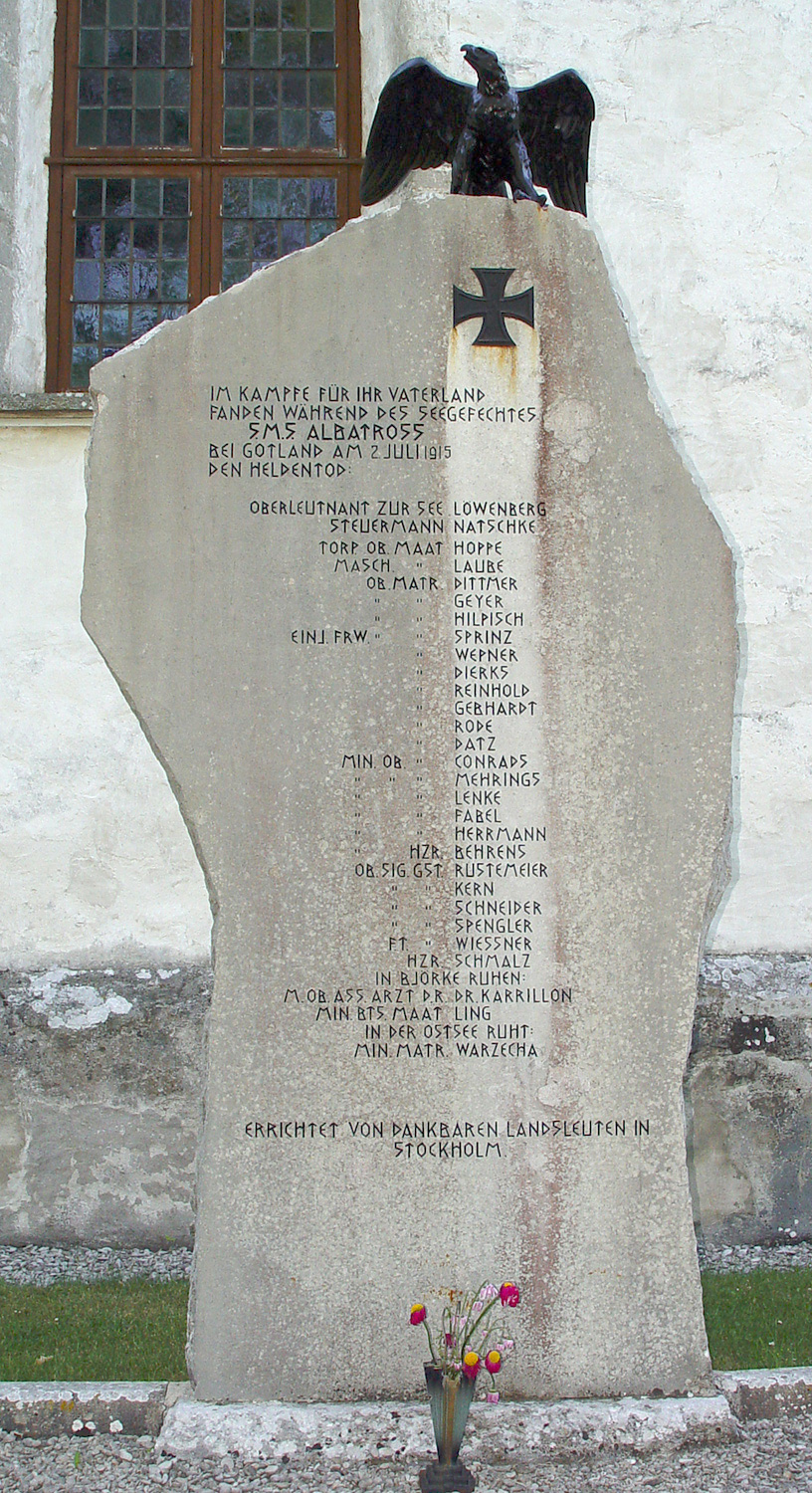
A memorial plaque at Östergarn Church dedicated to the fallen of Albatross

On 1 July [O.S. 18 June] 1915, (Note: Russia was still using the Julian calendar in 1915) a squadron consisting of the armoured cruisers Admiral Makarov, Bayan, Oleg, Bogatyr, Rurik and Novik, under Rear Admiral Mikhail Bakhirev in Oleg left their harbours in order to bombard Klaipėda (Memel). While sailing through thick fog Rurik and Novik separated from the main group and later acted independently.

On the same day the German mine-laying cruiser SMS Albatross, screened by the armoured cruiser SMS Roon, the light cruisers SMS Augsburg and Lübeck, and seven destroyers, under Kommodore Johannes von Karpf, were laying mines off the Åland Islands. After completing his mission, Karpf reported back through the radio. Karpf's message was intercepted and decoded. When Bakhirev became aware of the German squadron's whereabouts, the bombardment of Klaipėda was canceled. The squadron then focused on intercepting the German minelayers with the constant assistance of the naval staff.

In the early morning of 2 July [O.S. 19 June] 1915, the Russian squadron spotted and immediately opened fire on Augsburg, Albatross and three torpedo boats. Karpf commanded Roon and Lübeck, which at the time were heading towards Liepāja (Libau), to return to Gotland. At the same time he ordered Albatross to find shelter in Swedish territorial waters. Bogatyr and Oleg managed to catch up with Albatross and opened fire. The flaming Albatross ran aground near Östergarn. Bayan, Oleg and Rurik then attempted to return to their base. A couple of hours later they encountered Roon and Lübeck. A short artillery duel followed. A shortage of shells forced the Russian cruisers to retreat. Fearing a possible arrival of enemy reinforcements the damaged German ships also retreated.

As the German armoured cruisers SMS Prinz Adalbert and Prinz Heinrich sailed to reinforce the German squadron, Prinz Adalbert was torpedoed by the British submarine HMS E9 and limped to shore.

== Legacy ==
The battle is regarded as the first instance of Russian signals intelligence.
