= Krupp armour =

Type of steel armour used in the construction of capital ships

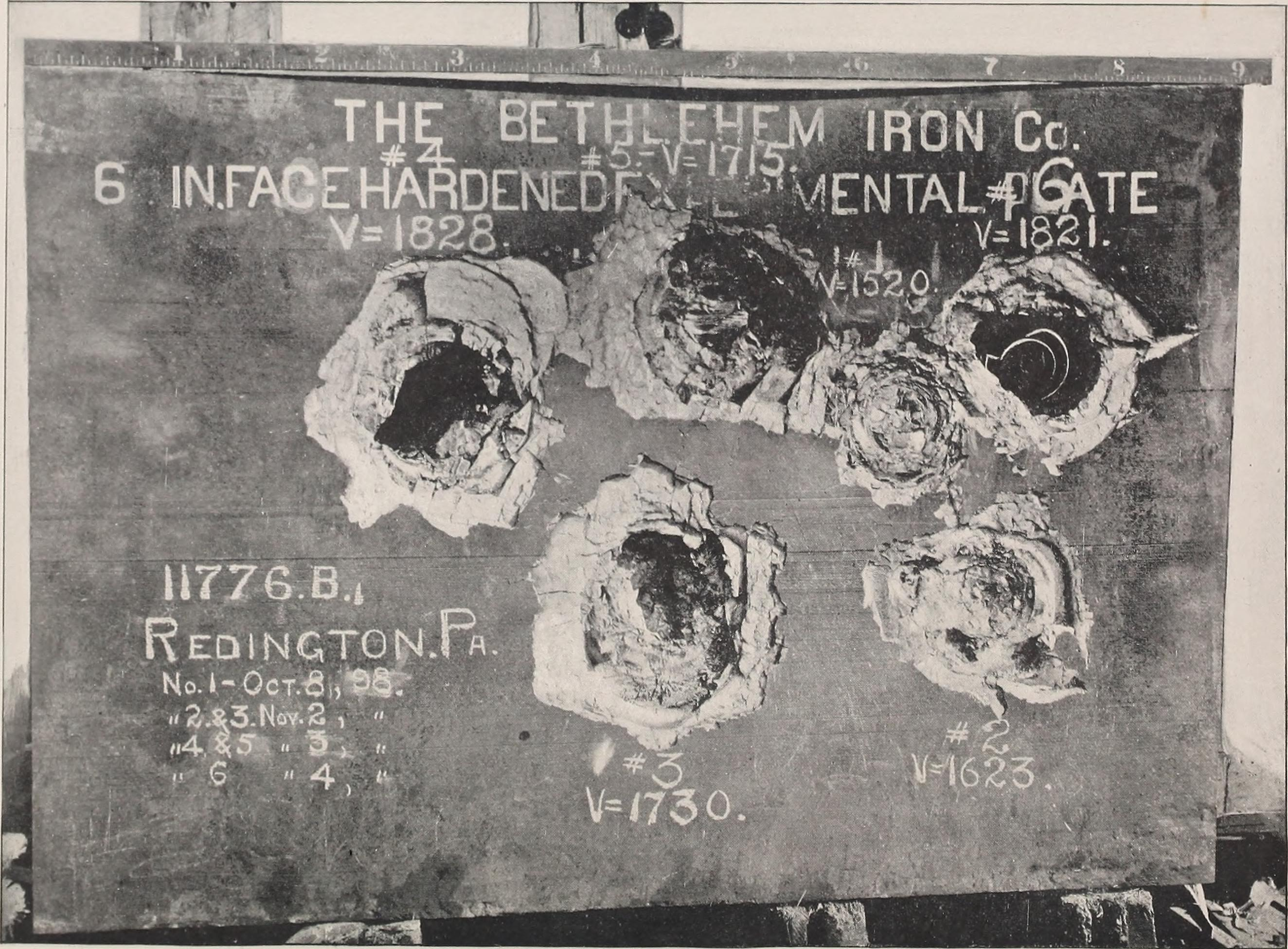
Experimental 6 inch (150 mm) Krupp armour plate from 1898

Krupp armour was a type of steel naval armour used in the construction of capital ships starting just before the 20th century. Developed by Germany's Krupp Arms Works in 1893, it quickly replaced Harvey armour as the primary method of protecting naval ships, before itself being supplanted by the improved Krupp cemented armour.

== Original Krupp armour ==
The initial manufacturing of Krupp armour was very similar to Harveyized armour; however, while the Harvey process generally used nickel-steel, the Krupp process added up to 1% chromium to the alloy to add hardness. Even though use of chromium in steels predated the use of nickel, the necessary amount of chromium complicated steel case-hardening due to its tendency to crack during heat treating. The Krupp process replaced water tempering with slower oil-tempering.

Also, while Harveyized armour was carburized by heating the steel and placing charcoal on its surface for long periods (often several weeks), Krupp armour went a step further. Instead of inefficiently introducing carbon at the surface with coal, Krupp armour achieved greater depth of carbon cementation by applying carbon-bearing gases (coal gas or acetylene) to the heated steel. Once the carburization process was complete, the metal was then transformed into face hardened steel by rapidly heating the cemented face, allowing the high heat to penetrate 30% to 40% of the steel's depth, then quickly quenching first the superheated side then both sides of the steel with powerful jets of either water or oil.

Krupp armour was swiftly adopted by the world's major navies; ballistic tests showed that 10.2 inches (25.9 cm) of Krupp armour offered the same protection as 12 inches (30.4 cm) of Harvey armour.

== Krupp cemented armour ==
By the early twentieth century, Krupp armour was rendered obsolete by the development of Krupp cemented armour (also "Krupp cemented steel", "K.C. armor" or "KCA"). The manufacturing process remained largely the same, with slight changes in the alloy composition: in % of total—carbon 0.35, nickel 3.90, chromium 2.00, manganese 0.35, silicon 0.07, phosphorus 0.025, sulfur 0.020.

KCA retained the hardened face of Krupp armour via the application of carbonized gases but also retained a much greater fibrous elasticity on the rear of the plate. This increased elasticity greatly reduced the incidence of spalling and cracking under incoming fire, a valuable quality during long engagements. Ballistic testing shows that KCA and Krupp armour were roughly equal in other respects.

== Homogeneous Krupp-type armour ==
Developments in face-hardened armour in the late nineteenth and early to mid-twentieth centuries revealed that such armour was less effective against glancing oblique impacts. The hardened face layer's brittleness was counterproductive against such impacts. Consequently, alongside face-hardened armour such as KCA, homogeneous armour types that combined ductility and tensile strength were developed to protect against glancing impacts. Homogeneous armour was typically used for deck armour, which is subject to more high-obliquity impacts and, on some warships such as Yamato class and Iowa class battleships, for lower belt armour below the waterline to protect against shells that land short and dive underwater.

Examples of such armour include German Wotan weich (Ww) and US special treatment steel (STS) and Class B homogeneous armour.

== Bibliography ==
- Okun, Nathan F. (1989). "Face Hardened Armor, Part I". Warship International. XXVI (3): 262–284. ISSN 0043-0374.
- Okun, Nathan F. (1990). "Re: Face Hardened Armor". Warship International. XXVII (2): 111. ISSN 0043-0374.
- Morss, Stafford (2008). "Question 37/44: Armor Backing of U.S. Warships". Warship International. XLV (4): 282–284. ISSN 0043-0374.
- Patterson, John (1990). "Re: Face Hardened Armor". Warship International. XXVII (2): 111. ISSN 0043-0374.
