= Nautilus-class submarine =

Nautilus-class submarine may refer to:

- Nautilus-class submarine (1913), an Italian class of submarines including the Italian submarine Nereide (1913)
- Nautilus-class submarine (1914), a single-build class of British Royal Navy diesel-electric propulsion submarines
- Nautilus-class submarine (1954), a single-build class of United States Navy nuclear-powered submarines

== See also ==
- HMS Nautilus
- USS Nautilus
- List of ships named Nautilus
