= Nautilus (submarine) =

Nautilus is the name of several submarines and submersibles. They are named after the nautilus.

== Military subs ==
- Nautilus (1800 submarine), a French First Republic sub designed by Fulton, considered the first practical sub (1800–1802)
- French submarine Nautilus (1930), a French Navy sub, a Saphir-class submarine (1927–1947)
- HMS Nautilus (1914), a UK Royal Navy sub, the largest RN sub at service entry (1914–1922)
- USS Nautilus (SS-168), a U.S. Navy sub, a Narwhal-class submarine (1930–1945)
- USS Nautilus (SSN-571), a prototype U.S. Navy sub, the first nuclear submarine (1954–1980)

== Civilian subs ==
- Nautilus (O-class submarine), a former U.S. Navy submarine, a O-class submarine (1917–1931)
- UC3 Nautilus, a Danish civilian home-built sub, part of a 2017 murder case (2009–2018)

== Fictional subs ==
- Nautilus (fictional submarine), a fictional submarine created by Jules Verne. Found in the novels Twenty Thousand Leagues Under the Seas (1870) and The Mysterious Island (1874)

== See also ==
- List of ships named Nautilus
- Nautilus (disambiguation)
