= Operation Strike =

1943 final battles of Tunisian campaign

- Part of the Tunisian campaign of the Second World War
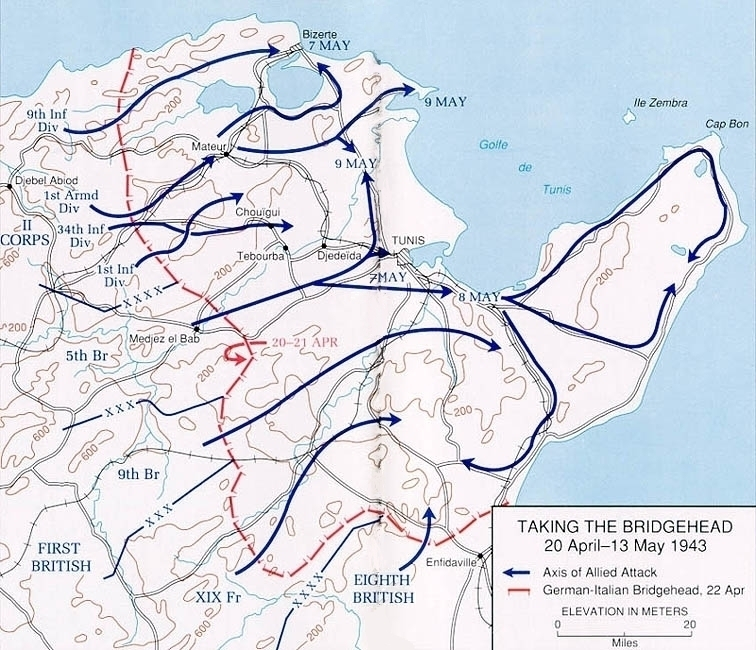
- Map showing Operation Strike 20 April to 13 May 1943
Date	6–13 May 1943
Location	Tunisia
Result	Allied victory
Territorial changes	Allied liberation of Tunisia

Belligerents
United Kingdom; United States; Free France	Germany; Italy

Commanders and leaders
(United Kingdom) Harold Alexander; Kenneth Anderson; Bernard Montgomery; Arthur Coningham; (United States) Omar Bradley	(Kingdom of Italy) Giovanni Messe (surrendered); (Nazi Germany) Hans-Jürgen von Arnim (surrendered); Gustav von Vaerst (surrendered)

Casualties and losses
	240,000 captured

Operation Strike (6–13 May 1943) was the last ground attack by the Allied forces of the First Army against the Italian and German forces in Tunis, Cape Bon and Bizerte, the last Axis bridgeheads in North Africa, during the Tunisian campaign of the Second World War. The offensive was launched only a week after the end of Operation Vulcan, in which the Axis forces had been severely weakened and hemmed in against the coast but the Allies were unable to break out.

Operation Strike was the follow up attack launched on 6 May. This time the Axis line was broken within 24 hours. Allied forces then streamed through and cut off various units. For the Axis, escape was impossible, on the following day Tunis fell to British forces and Bizerte fell to US troops. Axis forces were destroyed piecemeal, with mass surrenders taking place. Some fighting continued until the last Axis forces surrendered on 13 May 1943, bringing the total bag to around 250,000 Axis troops. Strike ended the North African campaign.

== Background ==
By April 13 1943, the Allied line faced the Axis who were now concentrated in Northeastern Tunisia from Enfidaville on the Southeast facing the Eighth Army, Pont Du Fahs and Medjez El Bab to Sedjenane facing the allied First Army (Kenneth Anderson). Anderson was able to turn his full attention to the orders he had received from 18th Army Group commander Field Marshal Harold Alexander to prepare the large-scale attack, scheduled for 22 April, to gain Tunis code named Operation Vulcan.

Sketch map of Tunisia during the 1942–1943 campaign

Operation Vulcan commenced on 22 April to breach the Axis defences and break out beyond towards Bizerte and Tunis. The attack succeeded in capturing important strategic locations such as Longstop Hill, Point 174 and Hill 609 and forced the Axis to withdraw elsewhere resulting in large areas being abandoned to the Allies. Vulcan did not break out through into the open ground as planned, but it severely weakened the Axis forces, and became the first stage of the final Allied assault in the Tunisian campaign.

By April 30, Anderson realised that a revision was necessary to achieve the complete destruction of Axis forces in North Africa. The revised final phase of the assault on Tunis was codenamed Strike and was aimed to be launched on May 6.

For Operation Strike, Lieutenant-General Brian Horrocks was transferred to the First Army to take over British IX Corps after its previous commander, Lieutenant-General John Crocker, was wounded in a training accident. IX Corps was also reinforced with experienced units of the Eighth Army, the 7th Armoured Division (Major-General George Erskine), 4th Indian Division (Francis Tuker) and the 201st Guards Brigade. While the other units of First Army would sweep into the plains facing them, so they could surround the Axis forces, V Corps was to hold the Axis forces against them and would this play a minor role. Facing both Corps were the Hermann Göring, 334th Infantry and what remained of 15th Panzer Divisions.

=== Plan ===
The objective of Strike was to capture Tunis and Bizerte and to seal off Cap Bon peninsula. Once achieved this would seal the fate of Axis forces in Tunisia who would ultimately be trapped. IX Corps was to use its two infantry divisions to break through the Axis defences in front of Massicault. The 4th Infantry Division and the 4th Indian Division were to attack the Axis defences on a narrow front and the 6th Armoured Division and 7th Armoured Division were to "dash through" the gap opened and capture the high ground 6 mi (9.7 km) west of Tunis. Anderson arranged a deception, the concentration of around 70 dummy tanks near Bou Arada on the IX Corps' front. This was to draw attention from the arrival of 7th Armoured Division in the Medjez el Bab sector. Horrocks planned for IX Corps to attack on a narrow 3,000 yd (2,700 m) front either side of the Medjez Tunis road. As a prelude, V Corps (Lieutenant-General Charles Walter Allfrey) was to capture Djebel Bou Aoukaz to protect the left flank. The II US Corps was to capture the high ground east and west of Chouigui, the river crossings at Tebourba and Djedeida and finally Bizerta. The French XIX Corps was to take the mountainous Djebel Zaghouan area.

=== Prelude ===
Preliminary moves were made before Operation Strike began. The Axis withdrawal against US II Corps on 1 May made it easier for the latter to move up the Ferryville road. The 1st Infantry Division were able to occupy the high ground west of the Oud Tina and got as far as Djebel Douimiss which was held in strength by the Regiment Barenthin.

To the south of the 1st Division, the 34th Division advanced from the Djebel Badjar area on 3 May and encountering very little resistance forced the Germans out of the town of Eddekhila two days later. Further North to the coast, the Corps Franc Afrique had advanced into the hills west of Djebel Chenti and US troops had outflanked Jefna by advancing into the hills. From this position the US II Crops was in a good position to strike for Bizerte and send units south to cooperate with the British in squeezing the 15th Panzer Division out of Tebourba.

Prior to the attack by IX Corps on May 5, V Corps launched an attack on Djebel Bou Aoukaz which had defied them during Operation Vulcan. The Royal Artillery had 600 guns and saturated Djebel Bou Aoukaz with high explosive as elements of the 3rd Infantry Brigade stormed the hill. Kampfgruppe Irkens was driven back and the hill was held, the Germans were unable to launch a counter attack due to lack of fuel. The capture of the hill secured the left flank of IX Corps allowing Horrocks to launch his armoured thrust north-eastwards.

== Operation Strike ==
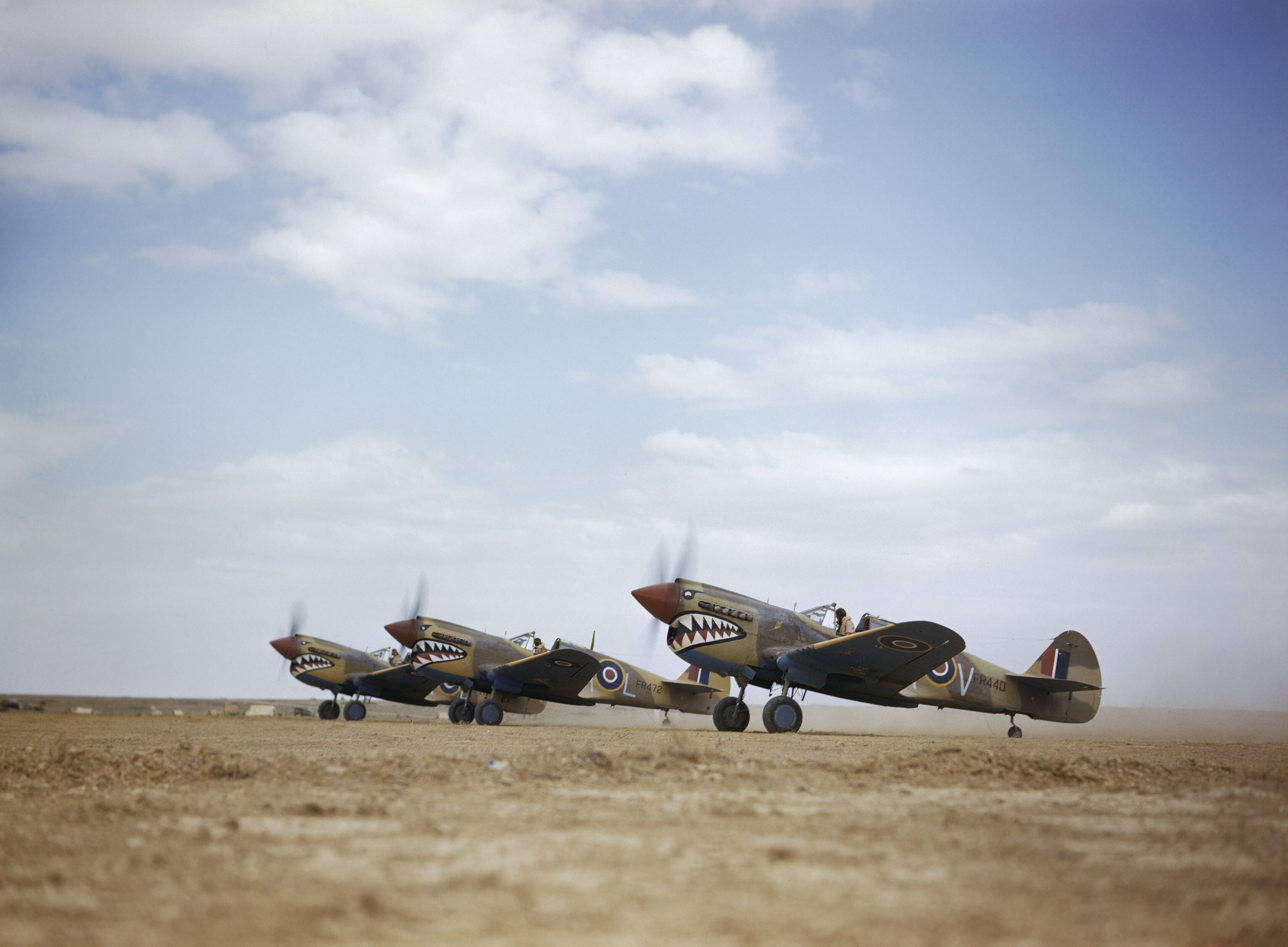
RAF Kittyhawk IIIs of 112 Squadron taking off in Tunisia for a sortie during Operation Strike

On May 6 at first light aerial support was available from the Northwest African Tactical Air Force with some medium bombers of the Northwest African Strategic Air Force. Between bombers, fighter bombers and fighters nearly 2,000 sorties were carried out in 24 hours. From Massicault towards Tunis they struck Protville, the area south-west of Tunis, the Cap Bon peninsula and intermediate strong points between Tunis and its outer defences. On that night, as the attack began, Wellington bombers from Misurata joined the Tactical Bomber Force in hitting areas near La Sebala and El Aouïna, Djedeïda, Tebourba and Cheylus.

The operation began at 3:00 a.m. in the morning of 6 May with troops moving up and artillery concentrations on Axis positions. Four hundred guns were available for the 3,000 yd (2,700 m) front. In two hours over 16,000 shells were fired in support of the 4th Infantry Division.

=== IX (British) Corps ===
The British IX Corps attacked behind a rolling barrage as planned but still found some resistance. The 4th Indian Infantry Division and 4th Infantry Division made a breach in the German line and the 334th infantry division buckled which let the 6th Armoured Division and the 7th Armoured Division move through a small gap, the tanks struggling through minefields. Four battalions of Churchill tanks of the 26th Armoured Brigade supporting the 4th Infantry Division began rolling toward Massicault. They reached the town of Furna where Axis anti-tank guns and tanks slowed them too. The brigade then fought in the only large tank on tank engagement during the operation. Elements of the 15th Panzer Division had put a force of Panzer III, Panzer IV and two Panzer VI (Tiger tanks) supported by two 88 mm guns. The overwhelming number of tanks easily knocked out the two 88 mm guns and most of the German armour was either abandoned or knocked out. The tanks and infantry overran two battalions of the 115th Panzer Grenadier Regiment and pushed back the remainder of the 15th Panzer Division to Massicault. The British occupied the town in the late afternoon, completing the first stage of the Allied push.

By evening of 6 May, IX Corps along with the II US Corps had pushed back the 5th Panzer Army. The dummy tanks, along with other deception tactics, helped achieve a degree of surprise regarding the size and location of the British armoured force. The divisions' commanders had to order the tanks to halt and allow the infantry to catch up and form a firm base before pushing on. The slower Churchills proved excellent at tank and infantry coordination but the quicker Shermans tended to leave the infantry a long way behind. There were thus concerns about German counter-attacks attempting to retake lost ground but by the end of day lack of fuel meant none were even planned. A message from Alexander was given to the divisional commanders to 'push on' and take Tunis.

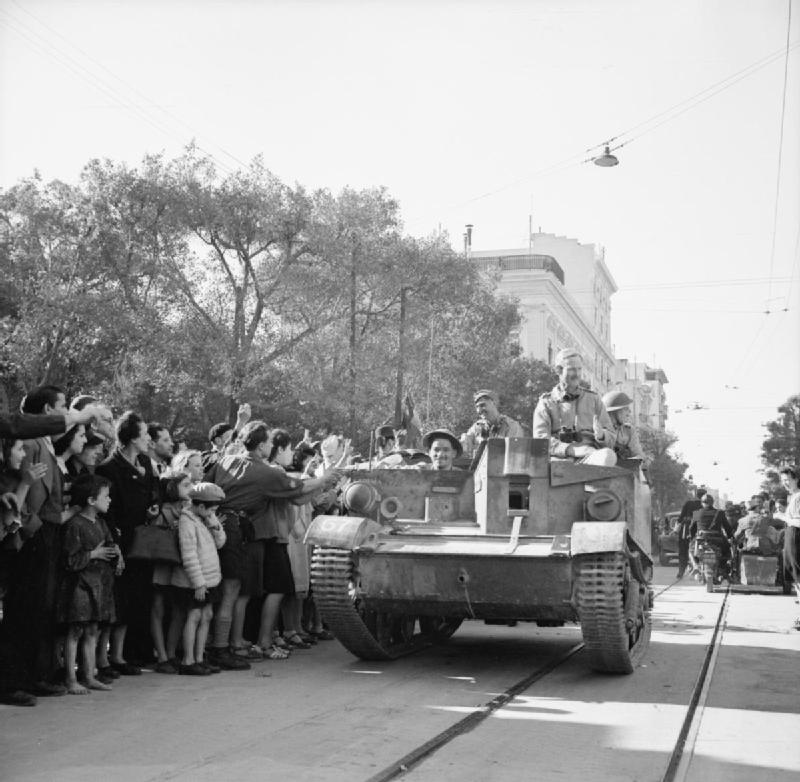
The civilian population of Tunis welcoming British troops as they enter the town on 7 May

In the morning of 7 May, the 6th Armoured Division and the 7th Armoured Division began to push harder but this time "met only scattered resistance". The 26th Armoured Brigade (6th Armoured Division) was in sight of Tunis by the afternoon. Patrols of the 1st Derbyshire Yeomanry and 11th Hussars reached the centre of Tunis around 4:00 p.m. where there some fighting but by the end of the day the city was secured along with scenes of celebrations. The Germans had destroyed the port facilities of Tunis and Bizerte the day before. Following the city's capture the 6th Armoured Division was ordered to stop Axis defensive positions being formed before the Cape Bon peninsula. The final objective for the day was the high ground overlooking La Mohammedia which was reached and taken as planned.

The 1st Armoured Division assaulted Djebel Kournine after a heavy bombardment in the late evening of 6 May which was captured with ease on the following morning. The division then moved to Créteville and in the next few days penetrated the hills on either side of the Grombalia–Tunis road. They too fought their way to trap the Axis in the Cape Bon peninsula.

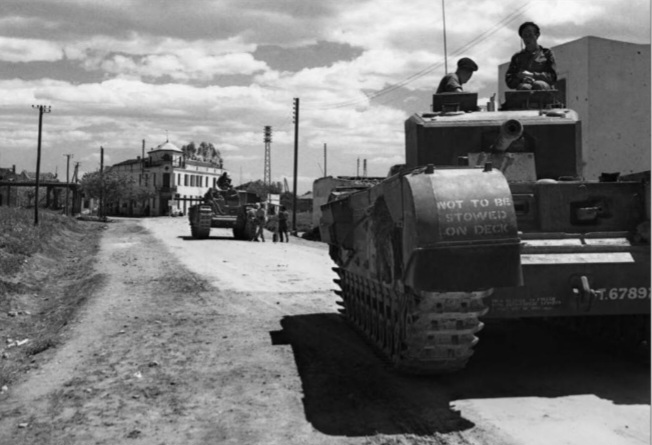
Churchill tanks of the North Irish Horse passing through Tebourba on 8 May

The 6th Armoured Division had also moved to the Cape Bon Peninsula but a narrow defile at Hammam-Lif barred the way. The objective was to take the high ground of Djebel el Rorouf - securing this would also secure the pass. It was defended in depth by the Germans by Kampfgruppe Frantz who had an assortment of anti-tank guns, nebelwerfer, machine guns and heavy artillery. The task fell to the 2nd Lothians and Border Horse and the 201st Guards Brigade. The tanks launched a frontal attack on 9 May but the German repelled the attacks, the 2nd Lothians losing about twenty Sherman tanks.

The Grenadier Guards were driving towards Djebel el Rorouf capturing about 400 Italians in the plain below. The Welsh Guards after some tough fighting captured Djebel el Rorouf in two days of fighting. The Coldstream Guards relieved the Welsh Guards and cleared the rest of the position. At dawn the next day a squadron of Lothian tanks decided on a risky assault via the beach that was found to be undefended. The tanks got on the beach and drove at speed in the wet sand and surf to outflank the German positions. At the same time the 17/21st Lancers which had arrived to reinforce the Lothians broke into the German positions in the town. Once the area was secured, the tanks cleared the way for the capture of Hammamet. The Germans retreated towards Grombalia and the 6th Armoured Division then raced towards Bou Ficha and Enfidaville, cutting them off.

=== XIX (French) Corps ===
XIX Corps had made a push towards Pont du Fahs against limited resistance. Elements of Division D'Algier entered the town on 7 May, the German having cleared out the day before. XIX Corps' next objective was to take the high peak of Djebel Zaghouan and drive the Axis forces into the valley below. The Division D'Oran (General Boissau) and Brigade Légère Mécanique (Mechanised Light Brigade, Le Coulteux) moved quickly from the north-east of Pont Du Fahs and drove north to the centre of the Zaghouan mountains.

The following day having advanced from the Pont du Fahs–Takrouna Road to the edge of the Zaghouan hills slopes resistance stiffened. The French advanced was checked by the 10,000 men of Kampfgruppe Pfieffer of the Afrika Korps entrenched around the hills. This composed of units from the 21st Panzer Division and the Italian 1st Infantry Division "Superga". Further attempts by the French over the following days were costly failures. On 10 May, Koeltz decided to besiege the area. Kampfgruppe Pfeiffer would then be trapped between the French and the advance of XI Corps below.

=== II US Corps ===
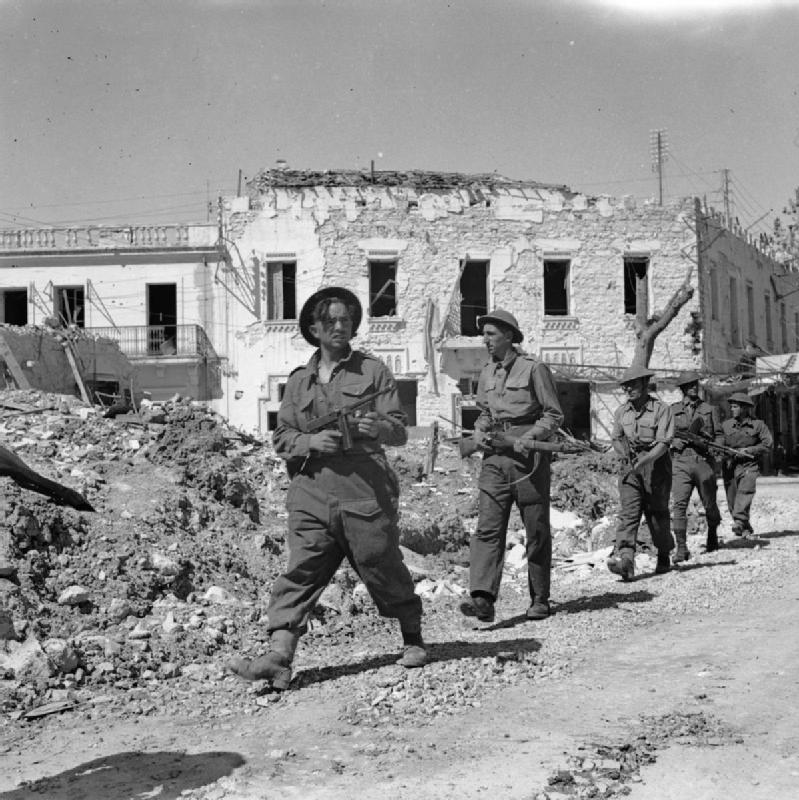
Corps francs d'Afrique troops move through the streets of Bizerte on May 1943

In the II US Corps, armour struck in the North and drove towards Djebel Kechabta driving the 15th Panzer Division from Djebel Mansour 4 mi (6.4 km) east of Ferryville. Here the Americans noticed the Germans in full retreat across the Tunis–Bizerte road. The Germans had expended the last of their artillery ammunition. Having advanced from Mateur around Lake Bizerte there was an opportunity to entrap Axis armour on the hills south-east of Bizerte. This was achieved when the crossroads were seized east of Mateur and then moved further towards Protville.

As fighting died down US troops entered Bizerte but allowed the Corps francs d'Afrique to make a symbolic entry. The Corps was a mixed force of French escapees from Vichy France, Moroccan Tabors, Berbers, Spanish Loyalists and other political refugees in support. They had been trained and equipped by the British earlier in the year.

Further North on 6 May, the 1st Infantry Division attacked the Djebel Douimiss held by the Barenthin regiment. The 18th and 26th Regimental Combat Teams were held up by minefields and a collapsed bridge. Both RCTs were repulsed and after suffering many casualties were pulled back in the night. The following day patrols found the hill abandoned, as the Germans had retreated due to attacks elsewhere.

With Bizerte taken, US forces cut off the remains of the Fifth Panzer Army. On 8 May CCA of the 1st Armored Division struck in the North and made for a 4 mi (6.4 km) push for Djebel Sidi Mansour which was taken after severe fighting. The 15th Panzer Division attempted to make an attack but it was broken up easily; 200 prisoners were taken and it was noted from the crest of Djebel Sidi Mansour that the Germans were in full retreat. Because of the lack of fuel, many vehicles lay abandoned and were set on fire.

Axis forces began to lose contact with each other. Major-General Gustav von Vaerst the commander of the Fifth Panzer Army sent a final situation report on the morning of 9 May to Heeresgruppe Afrika "Our armour and artillery have been destroyed; without ammunition and fuel; we shall fight to the last".

=== Axis evacuation attempts ===
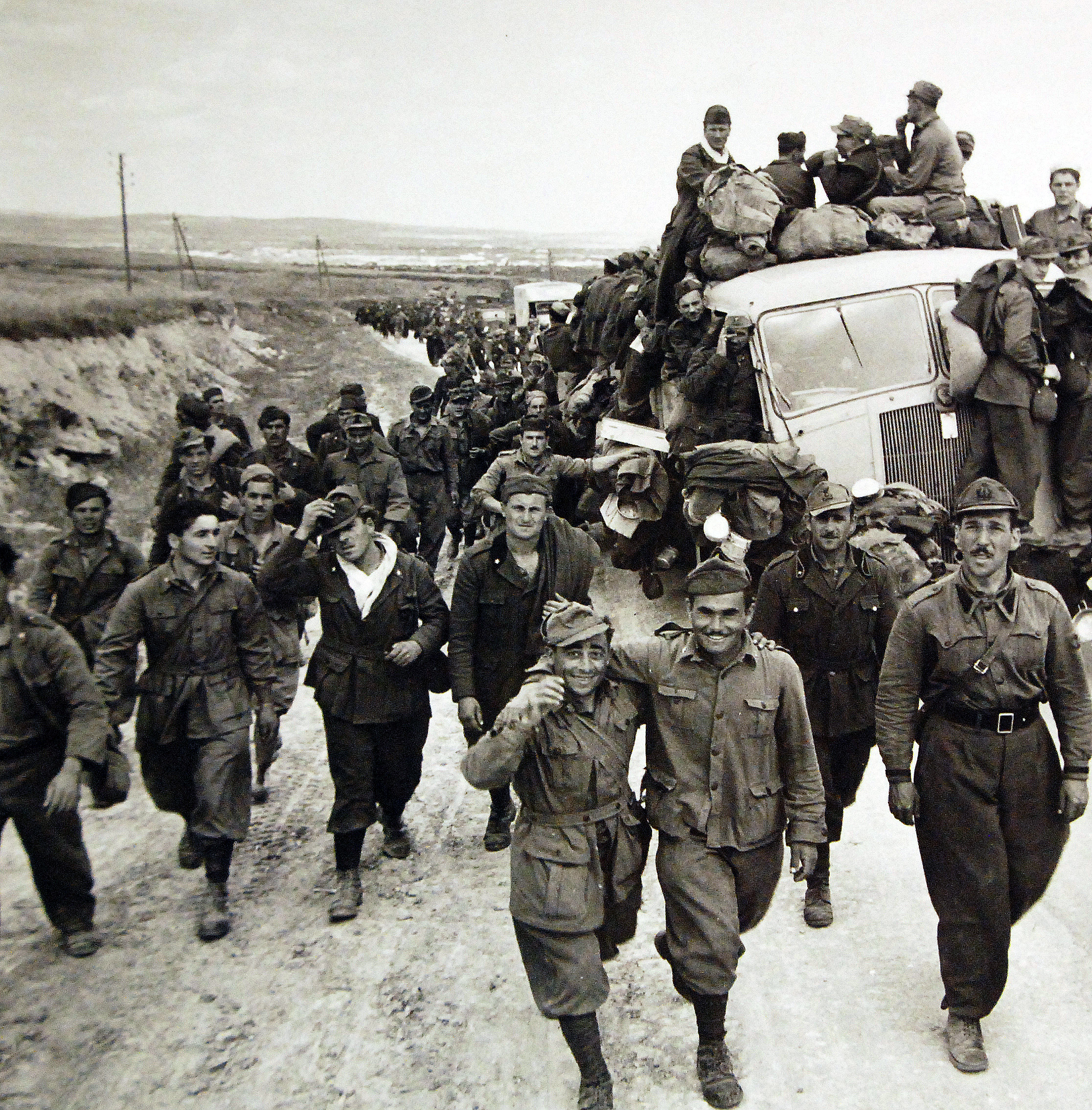
Axis POWs taken by troops of US II Corps

The Germans and Italians tried to evacuate using their remaining aircraft and ships. Many aircraft were intercepted and shot down and many boats sunk. On 7 May 1943, the Italian hospital ships SS Aquileia and SS Virgilio managed to transport several hundred wounded troops to Trapani in Sardinia, despite Allied attacks.

Some German senior officers managed to fly out of the pocket. By early May, some officers were ill and were evacuated from Tunisia, escaping capture. These included Friedrich Weber (334th Division), Hasso von Manteuffel (Manteuffel Division), and Fritz Bayerlein, chief of staff to Giovanni Messe. They were replaced by Major-General Fritz Krause, Major-General Alfred Bülowius and Oberst Markert, respectively. Friedrich-Wilhelm Gause was summoned to a conference in Italy on 4 May and Joseph Schmid (Hermann Göring Division) was ordered by Hermann Göring to fly out on 9 May. The Italians were not so lucky, only a small number of officers made it to safety. Royal Navy destroyers and Motor Torpedo Boats took 879 prisoners at sea, as part of Operation Retribution.

By 9 May, the 7th Armoured Division had closed the coastal area north of Tunis, taking some 19,000 prisoners of the 15th Panzer Division attempting to escape in and around Porto Farina. The 4th infantry Division and the 6th Armoured Division moved swiftly into the Cape Bon peninsula, making any escape impossible.

=== Axis surrender ===
On 9 May, US II Corps had completed the destruction of Fifth Panzer Army. Ferryville and El Alia were taken along with several thousand prisoners. During the rest of the day - German resistance ceased and troops started surrendering en masse. Two days later the only resistance came from the Hermann Göring Division in the Djebel Achkel - US forces also cornered Vaerst who surrendered before noon. At least 12,000 Germans surrendered, including the Afrika Korps artillery commander, Major-General Fritz Krause, who gave himself up to Lieutenant Albert Klein from the US Army Signal Corps.

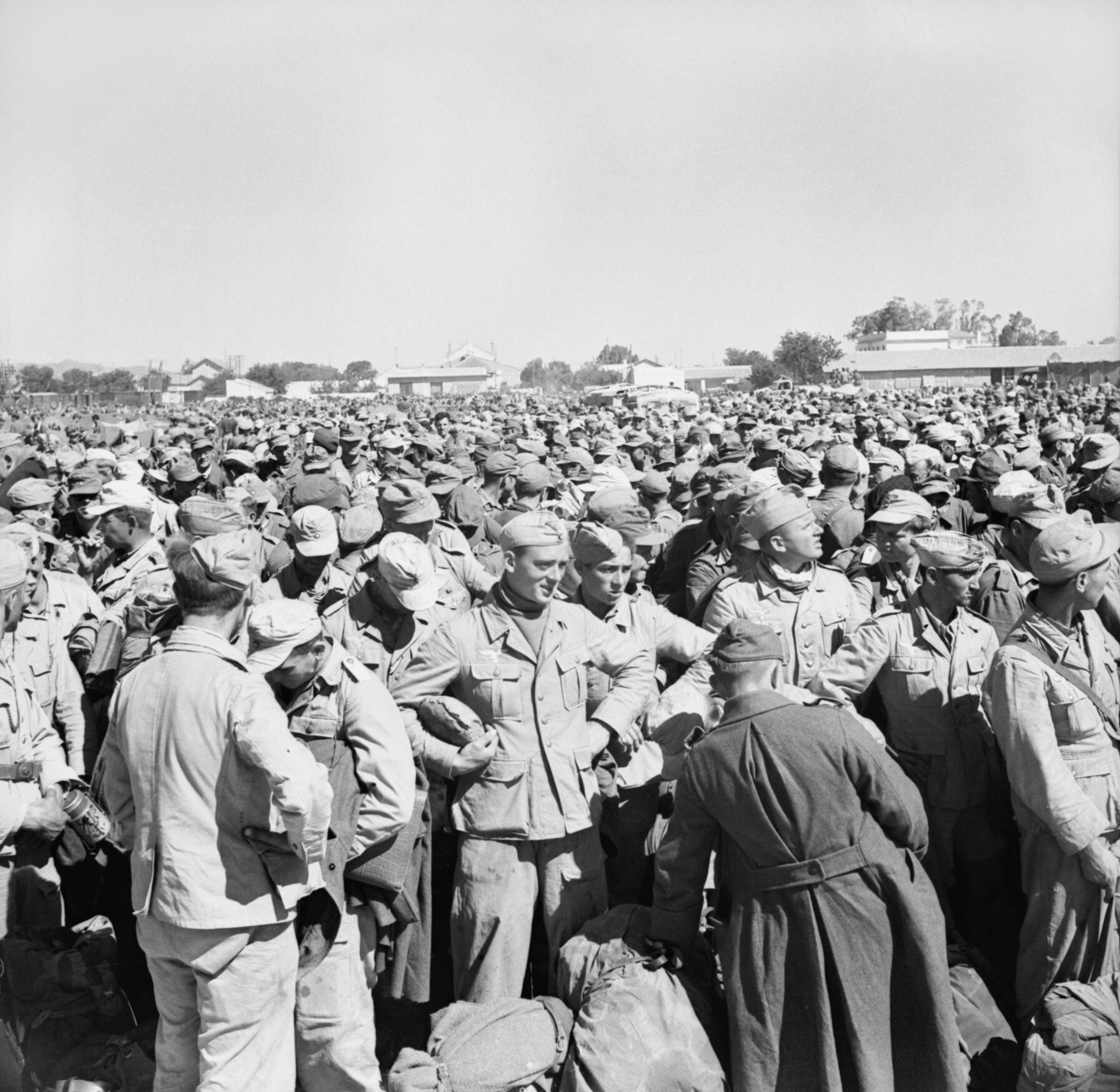
Scores of German and Italian prisoners at Grombalia prisoner of war camp after the fall of Tunis - photo taken by Alan Whicker

At nightfall on 11 May, the British 4th Division controlled the Cape Bon peninsula and the 6th Armoured Division held the road from Hammamet to Bou Ficha. Germans prisoners were now also being taken in the tens of thousands in the IX Corps and V Corps sector. Royal Engineers were hastily brought up to build makeshift compounds, including a large one at Grombalia. The British found that the number of prisoners were soon overwhelming - Major General Kenneth Strong at Allied Forces Headquarters estimated they had enough supplies to accommodate 150,000 but this was soon far exceeding this number. The camps soon had to be expanded - the camp at La Bardo near Tunis became dangerously overcrowded and Italians and Germans had to be separated due to ill feeling with each other.

The 334th Division surrendered to the British between Mateur and Tebourba on 8 May. Major-General Count Theodor von Sponeck, commander of the 90th Light Division, surrendered unconditionally to Charles Keightley of the 6th Armoured Division after a big bombardment from the 2nd New Zealand Division and 56th Infantry Division artillery. Around Enfidaville, the remaining 80,000 troops of the Italian 1st Army was still holding the Allied forces.

=== Final actions ===
By 11 May the only other resistance in Tunisia came from the 22,000 Germans that were trapped between the French Corps and IX Corps in the North and the Eighth Army further to the south-west. Armeegruppe Von Arnim and Armeegruppe Messe were hastily formed. Within hours however they lost touch as Lieutenant General Maurice Mathenet's Maroc Division finally broke through 21st Panzer defences. The Brigade Légère Mécanique took Djebel Zoughouan and reached Sainte Marie du Zit in the evening. The Division d'Oran then met up with units of 4th Indian Division in the hills south of the town. Seeing no way out, Kampfgruppe Pfieffer with some 10,000 men surrendered along with their equipment to the French with Pfieffer himself surrendering to Mathenet. The rest of the division including the 21st Panzer's commanding officer Oberst Heinrich-Hermann von Hülsen surrendered to the British. In addition the rest of the Italian 'Superga' Division surrendered to elements of the 4th Indian Division; even the company cooks of the 1/4 Essex seized transport and brought in prisoners.

The following day, in the hills North of Sainte Marie du Zit, Arnim and Hans Cramer were trapped. Having destroyed their equipment and sent out last orders, troops of the Royal Sussex Regiment had worked their way around onto the heights around Von Arnim's headquarters. 1,000 men lined themselves up on parade and surrendered, Arnim and Cramer negotiated their surrender to Charles Allfrey and Francis Tuker, commanders of V Corps and 4th Indian Infantry Division respectively. Both German generals were later brought to 1st Army H.Q where Kenneth Anderson and Field Marshal Alexander wined and dined them.

On the same day RAF and artillery continued their bombardment against all remaining Axis forces in Tunisia some 80,000 men including the 'Young Fascist', 'Trieste' and 164th Light Divisions with Messe still commanding. Messe had, with Mussolini's approval, tried to negotiate an "honourable surrender" the previous day but this had been rejected. Earlier in the morning he was promoted to the rank of field marshal but the Allies would only accept unconditional surrender and threatened to resume their attacks.

On May 13, at 12:20 hours Messe gave the orders - he and the remaining German commander, Kurt von Liebenstein, surrendered late in the day unconditionally to Lieutenant-General Sir Bernard Freyberg and Major General Douglas Graham.

Later that day the First and Eighth Armies met at Bou Ficha, thus completing Operation Strike and the Tunisian and North African campaign. It was not until 12 June that the last Axis forces had been rounded up. The total number of Axis prisoners taken in the British and Commonwealth sector was reported to be 150,000.

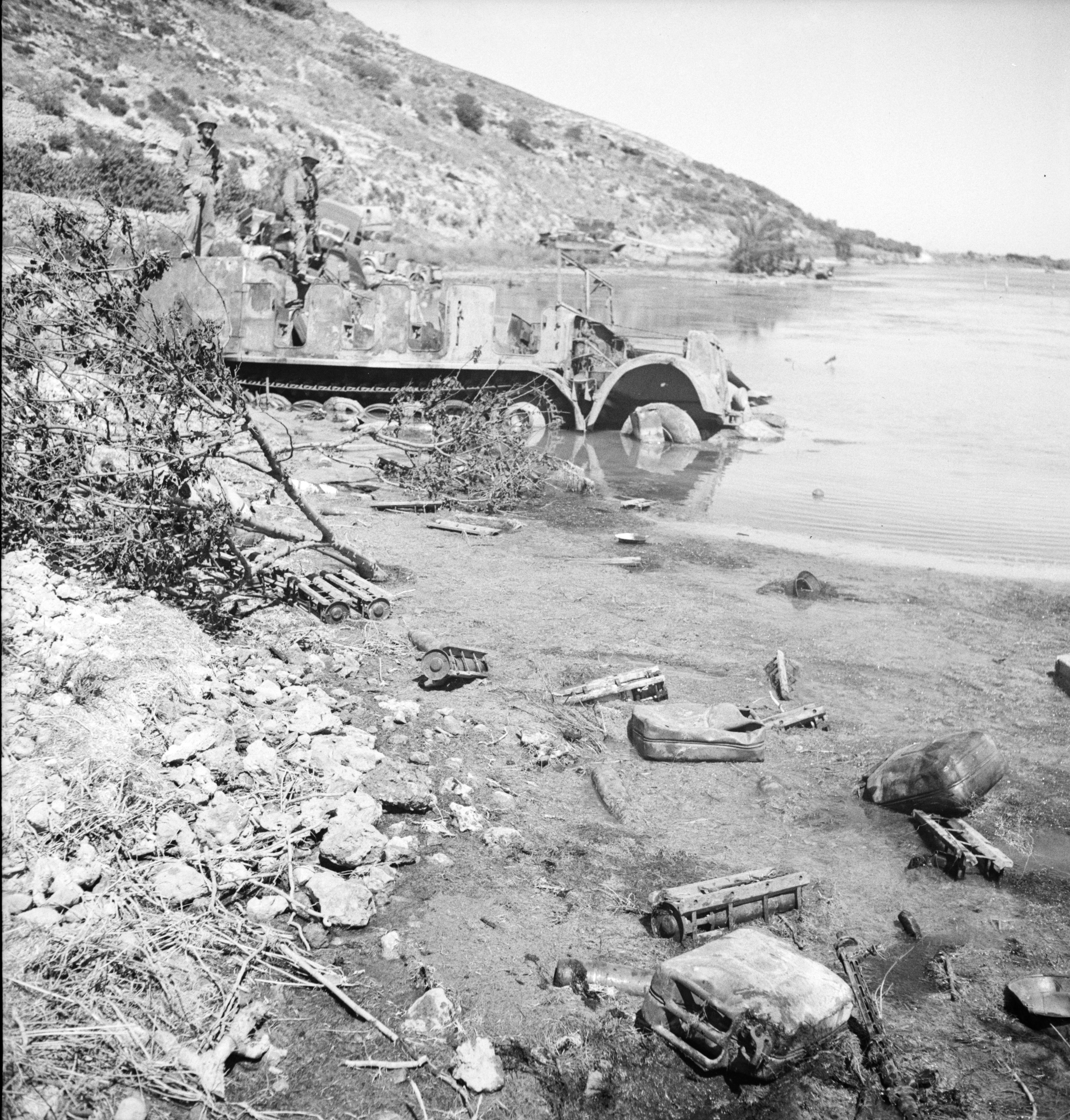
A beach near Porto Farina strewn with debris - a German SdKfz 11 half-track gun tractor lays in the water

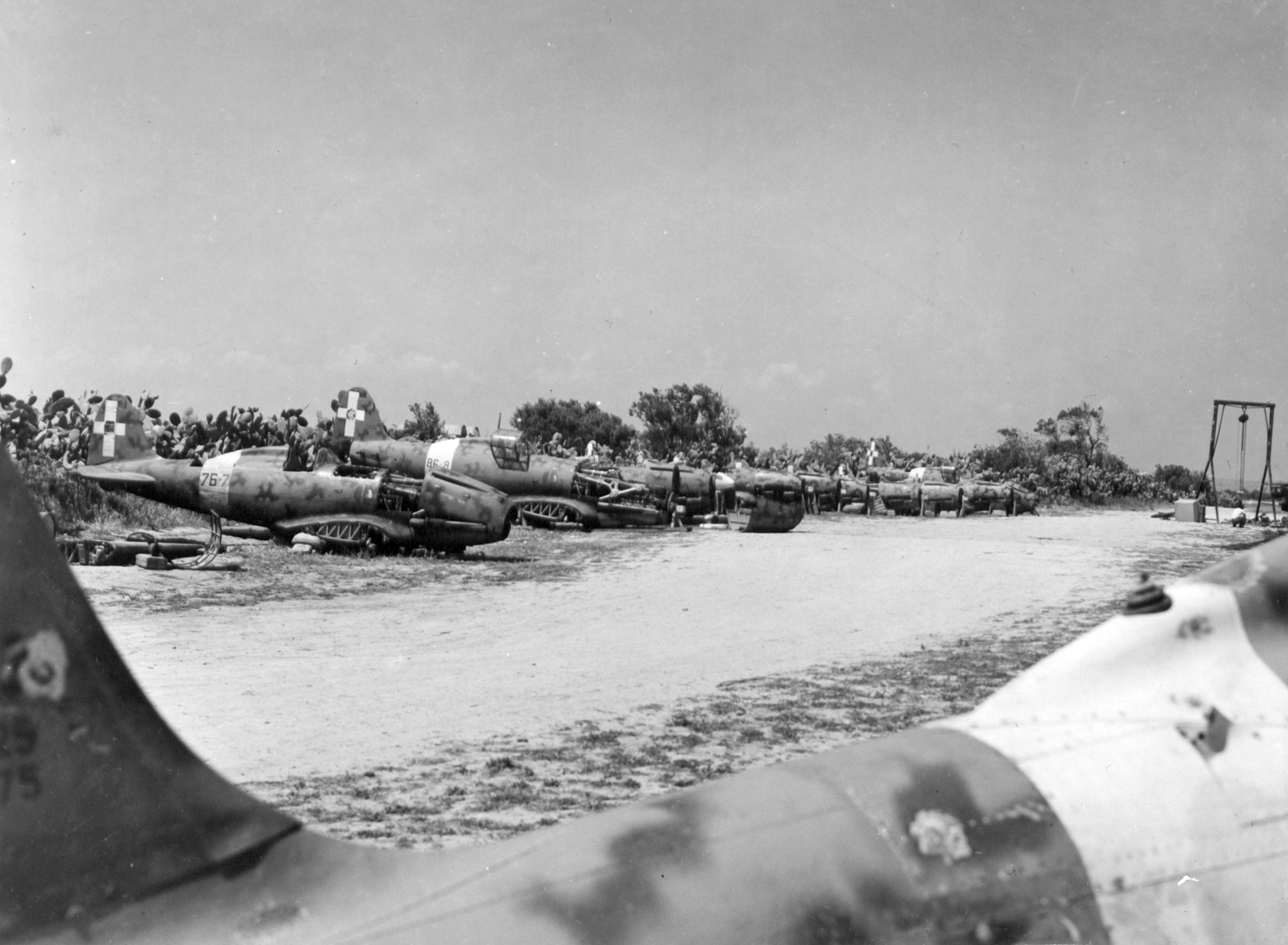
Abandoned fuselages of Italian Macchi C.202 Folgore aircraft at Tunis

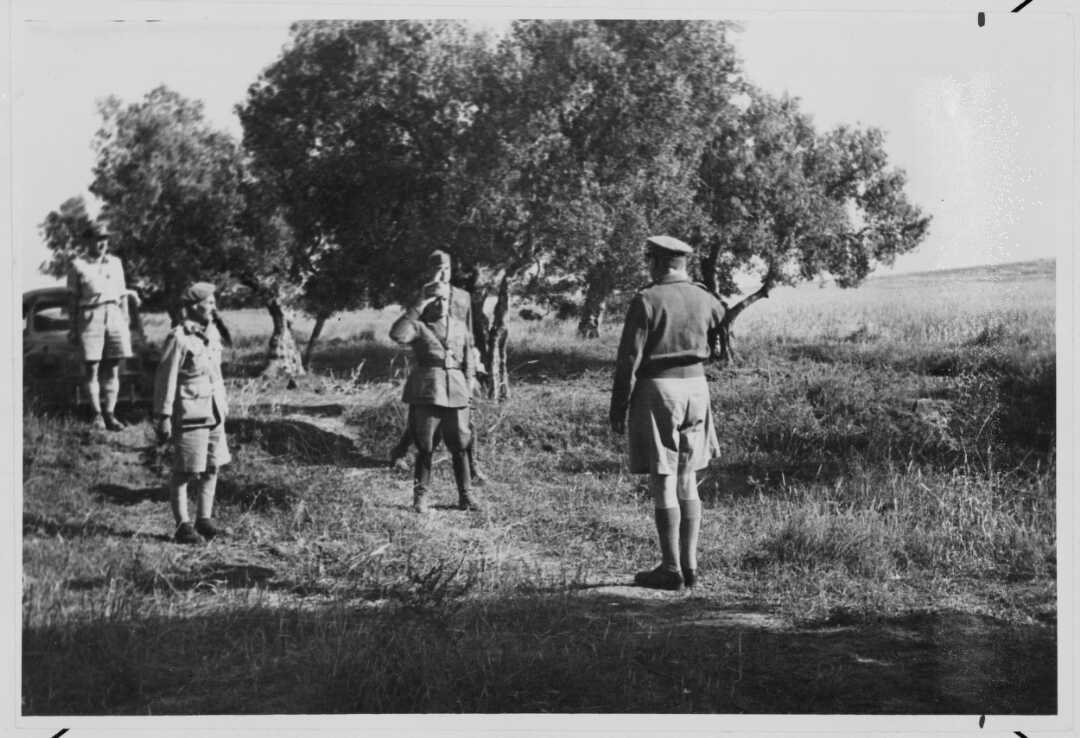
Italian Field Marshal Giovanni Messe surrenders to Lieutenant-General Sir Bernard Freyberg

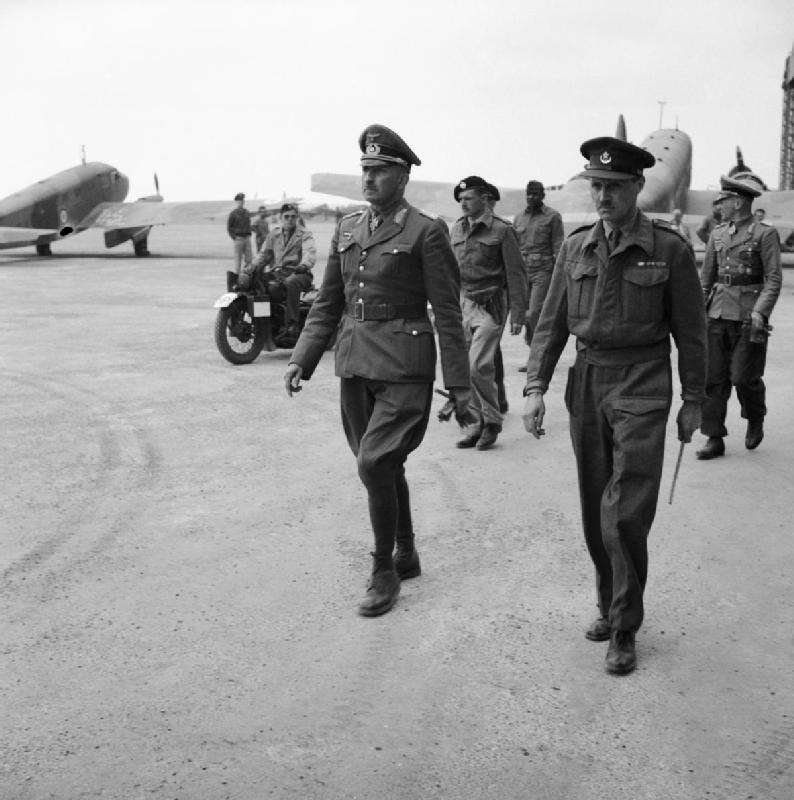
Hans-Jürgen von Arnim in captivity leaving for England

== Aftermath ==
On 13 May, General Alexander signalled to Winston Churchill,

Sir it is my duty to report that the Tunisian Campaign is over. All enemy resistance has ceased. We are masters of the North African shore.

For the Axis the defeat in Tunisia was catastrophic, they had committed large numbers of troops, most of whom had surrendered. By the close of the operation, nearly 240,000 German and Italian troops had been captured and of these 102,000 were German. The British were responsible for taking approximately 70 per cent of the prisoners while the Americans and French accounted for the rest. So effective was Operation Retribution that only 653 Axis troops managed to escape to Europe, mostly in small craft.

The Axis also committed a huge amount of equipment and the booty was considerable, 200 tanks (mostly German) of various types, 1,200 guns and about 600 undamaged aircraft, all having been abandoned for lack of fuel. By far the most catastrophic losses were suffered by the Luftwaffe, that had committed 40 per cent of new aircraft to the Mediterranean, the majority having been lost by 13 May. During the final operations, the Luftwaffe lost 273 aircraft; 42 bombers, 166 fighters, 52 transport aircraft and 13 Storch observation aircraft; the Italians recorded the loss of 17 aircraft. The Luftwaffe also lost many technicians and mechanics as POWs.

The Regia Marina and merchant marine attempting to supply the Tunisian bridgehead had also suffered and would never really recover. In the harbours of Tunis and Bizerte lay sunken German and Italian vessels. The German destroyer Hermes (ex-Greek) was captured and in other Tunisian harbours the Allies discovered 12 minesweepers, 25 freighters, 9 tugs and 23 small craft. There was also the ex-French destroyer L'Audacieux and submarines Calypso, Nautilus, Turquoise and Circé.

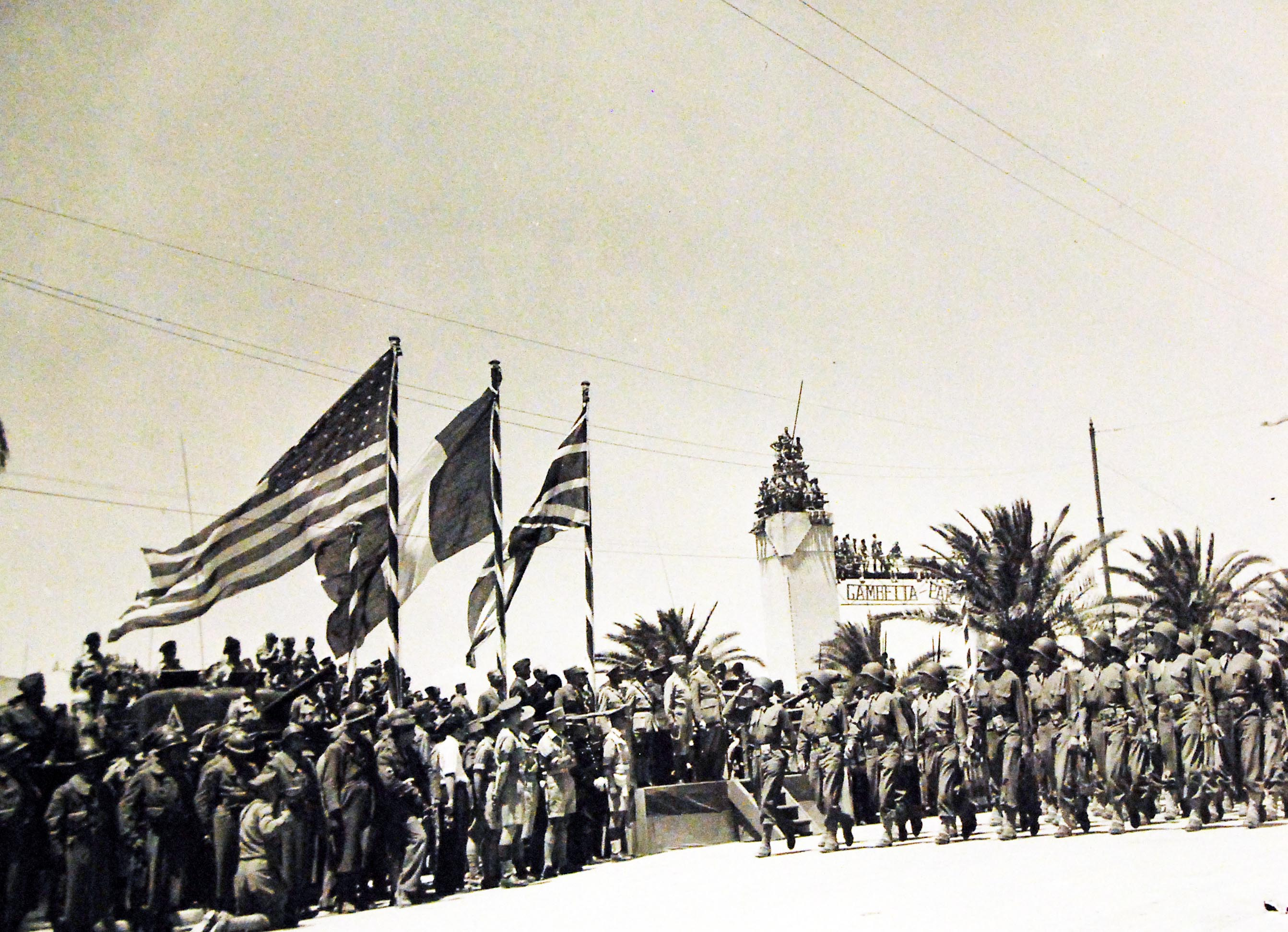
American soldiers passing the reviewing stand during the Allied victory parade in Tunis

Such was the defeat that Joseph Goebbels wrote that the end in Tunisia was as bad as the Battle of Stalingrad and Germans coined the term 'Tunisgrad'. Of the Axis commanders, Messe, Arnim and Vearst were taken into captivity. Messe was held at Wilton Park Estate in England until September when, following the Italian Armistice, the Allies made him chief of staff of the Italian Co-Belligerent Army. Arnim and Vaerst were sent to Britain, where they were held and interrogated at Trent Park. Arnim was sent to Latimer House with other captured German generals, where their conversations were secretly monitored. Vaerst and Arnim were later sent to the United States to Camp Clinton and were released in 1947.

For the Allies, casualties were light during Operations Vulcan and Strike, with the los of 45 bombers and 110 fighters. The RAF lost 12 bombers and 47 fighters, the USAAF lost 32 bombers and 63 fighters and the French lost 1 bomber. On 15 May the Allied 18th Army Group was disbanded and a victory parade was held in Tunis on 20 May. Units of the British First Army and Eighth Army and representative detachments of American and French forces marched past, with bands playing. Generals Eisenhower, Alexander and Giraud took the salute. With North Africa in Allied hands, plans quickly turned to the invasion of Sicily which took place July 1943 and the Italian campaign that began two months later.

== See also ==
- North African campaign timeline
- Battle of Enfidaville
