= Nautilus (disambiguation) =

Nautilus is the common name of members of the marine cephalopod family Nautilidae, which also contains the genus Nautilus.

Nautilus may also refer to:

== Places ==
- Nautilus (Miami Beach), a Mid-Beach neighborhood of Miami Beach, Florida, United States
- Nautilus Mountain, a summit in British Columbia

== Transport and vehicular ==
- Lincoln Nautilus, a luxury crossover SUV

=== Ships and submarines ===
- A number of ships named Nautilus
- A number of submarines named Nautilus

== Space ==
- Nautilus, a proposed spacecraft in the exploration of Neptune
- Nautilus-X, a proposed NASA spacecraft
- Nautilus Deep Space Observatory, a proposed array of space telescopes
- BA 330 inflatable space habitat, also known as Nautilus space complex module

== Computing, software, electronics ==
- Nautilus (video game), 1982 Atari home video game
- Nautilus (file manager), the official file manager for the GNOME desktop
- Nautilus (secure telephone), an early TCP/IP secure telephony software package
- VAX 8700/8800, code-named Nautilus, from the VAX 8000 family of Digital Equipment Corporation computers
- B&W Nautilus, a brand of Bowers & Wilkins (B&W) speakers
- Korg Nautilus, a musical synthesizer workstation

== Groups, companies, organizations ==
- Nautilus (video game company), formerly Sacnoth, a Japanese video game developer
- Nautilus Institute for Security and Sustainability, a public policy think-tank
- Nautilus, Inc., American exercise equipment company
- Nautilus International, an international trades union and professional association representing seafarers and allied workers
- Nautilus Minerals Inc., Canadian underwater mining company

== Arts, entertainment, media ==
- Nautilus (photograph), a photograph by Edward Weston
- Nautilus (TV series), a TV series about the early years of Captain Nemo

=== Literature ===
- Nautilus Award, Polish science-fiction award
- Nautilus (science magazine)
- The Nautilus (journal), malacological journal
- The Nautilus (magazine), a magazine of the New Thought Movement
- Nautilus (fictional submarine), a fictional submarine in Twenty Thousand Leagues Under the Seas and The Mysterious Island by Jules Verne

=== Music ===
- "Nautilus" (song), from a 1974 Bob James jazz album
- Nautilus (album), an album by Serbian industrial group dreDDup
- "Nautilus", from the 2016 album Varmints by the British composer Anna Meredith

== Other ==
- Tactical High Energy Laser, a military laser system also known as Nautilus
- Nautilus collection, a luxury sports watch collection by Patek Philippe SA
- The variable-resistance cable weight machine is commonly known by its eponymous brand name, Nautilus
- Nautilus (board game), 2002

== See also ==
- Natilus, American aerospace company
