= French submarine Pierre Chailley =

French Navy Diane-class submarine commissioned 1933

Pierre Chailley
- Pierre Chailley sometime before February 1925.

History

France
- Name: Paul Chailley
- Namesake: Paul Étienne Pierre Chailley (1886–1914), French naval officer
- Operator: French Navy
- Ordered: 18 May 1917
- Builder: Chantiers et Ateliers Augustin Normand, Le Havre, France
- Laid down: May 1917
- Launched: 19 December 1922
- Renamed: Pierre Chailley 15 February 1923
- Namesake: Paul Étienne Pierre Chailley (1886–1914), French naval officer
- Commissioned: 1 August 1923
- Decommissioned: 13 May 1936
- Stricken: 13 May 1936
- Identification: No pennant number
- Fate: Condemned 14 May 1936; Sold 16 April 1937; Scrapped

General characteristics
- Class & type: Unique minelayer submarine
- Displacement: 884 long tons (898 t) (surfaced); 1,191 long tons (1,210 t) (submerged)
- Length: 70 m (229 ft 8 in)
- Beam: 7.52 m (24 ft 8 in)
- Draft: 4.04 m (13 ft 3 in)
- Propulsion: 2 x Sulzer two-stroke diesel engines, 1,800 hp (1,342 kW); 2 x electric motors, 1,400 hp (1,044 kW); Two screws
- Speed: 13.75 knots (25.5 km/h; 15.8 mph) (surfaced); 8.5 knots (15.7 km/h; 9.8 mph) (submerged)
- Range: 2,800 nmi (5,190 km; 3,220 mi) at 11 knots (20 km/h; 13 mph) (surface); 80 nmi (148 km; 92 mi) at 5 knots (9.3 km/h; 5.8 mph) (submerged)
- Complement: 4 officers, 40 men
- Armament: 4 × 450 mm (18 in) bow torpedo tubes; 2 × 450 mm (18 in) external torpedo tubes; 6 x torpedoes; 1 x 100-millimetre (3.9 in) deck gun; 24 or 40 x 200 kg (441 lb) mines

Pierre Chailley was a French Navy minelayer submarine commissioned in 1923. She was the ancestor of the Saphir-class submarines, which were the last French minelayer submarines. She was decommissioned in 1936.

Pierre Chailley — originally named Paul Chailley — was named for the commanding officer of the submarine Curie, Lieutenant de vaisseau Paul Étienne Pierre Chailley, killed during World War I when two Austro-Hungarian Navy ships sank Curie on 20 December 1914.

== Design ==
A double-hulled ocean-going submarine, Pierre Chailley was 70 metres (229 ft 8 in) long, with a beam of 7.52 metres (24 ft 8 in) and a draft of 4.04 metres (13 ft 3 in). Her surface displacement was 884 long tons (898 t), and her submerged displacement was 1,191 long tons (1,210 t). She was propelled on the surface by two Sulzer two-stroke diesel engines producing a combined 1,800 horsepower (1,342 kW). Underwater propulsion was provided by two electric motors producing a combined 1,400 horsepower (1,044 kW). The twin-propeller propulsion system made it possible to reach a speed of 13.75 knots (25.5 km/h; 15.8 mph) on the surface and 8.5 knots (15.7 km/h; 9.8 mph) when submerged. She had a range of 2,800 nautical miles (5,190 km; 3,220 mi) at 11 knots (20 km/h; 13 mph) on the surface and 80 nautical miles (148 km; 92 mi) at 5 knots (9.3 km/h; 5.8 mph) underwater.

Pierre Chailley′s main armament consisted of 24 or 40 (according to different sources) 200-kilogram (441 lb) mines, and she employed the Fernand Fenaux minelaying system, in which the mines were stored in wells placed in inclined external ballast tanks, with a direct release mechanism. She had six 450-millimetre (18 in) torpedo tubes, four internal at the bow and two trainable external tubes, and carried a total of six torpedoes. She also had a 100-millimetre (3.9 in) deck gun which fired a 13.6-kilogram (30 lb) shell. Her crew consisted of four officers and 40 petty officers and seamen.

== Construction and commissioning ==
Pierre Chailley was ordered during World War I on 18 May 1917 with the name Paul Chailley as part of France's 1917 naval expansion program. She was designed by Marie-Augustin Normand and Fernand Fenaux. Her keel was laid down at Chantiers et Ateliers Augustin Normand in Le Havre, France, in May 1917. She was launched on 19 December 1922, completed at the end of 1922, and renamed Pierre Chailley on 15 February 1923. She was commissioned on 1 August 1923. She had no Q-series pennant number.

== Service history ==
Pierre Chailley spent her operational career mostly in the Mediterranean Sea. The French Navy used her mainly for the study of and experimentation with undersea warfare techniques.

On 8 April 1925, Pierre Chailley′s trainable torpedo tubes suffered damage. During a minelaying exercise on 20 November 1927, two of her mines became stuck in their launch chutes. She suffered serious damage to her two diesel engines on 13 June 1928 and had a water leak in her battery compartment on 27 June 1930.

Pierre Chailley was placed in "special reserve" on 11 July 1933. She officially was declared unfit for use as a combat vessel on 21 January 1935.

== Disposal ==
Decommissioned and stricken from the navy list on 13 May 1936, Pierre Chailley was condemned at Cherbourg, France, on 14 May 1936. She was towed to Brest, France, on 5 September 1936, sold at Brest on 16 April 1937, and subsequently scrapped.

== See also ==
- French submarine Maurice Callot
- Saphir-class submarine (1928)
