= Saphir-class submarine =

Two classes of French submarines were known as the Saphir class:

- Saphir-class submarine (1928)
- Saphir-class submarine (1951)
