= French submarine Maurice Callot =

French Navy Diane-class submarine commissioned 1933

Maurice Callot
History

France
- Name: Pierre Callot
- Namesake: Pierre Félix Maurice Callot (1873–1910), French naval officer
- Operator: French Navy
- Ordered: 20 March 1917
- Builder: Forges et Chantiers de la Gironde, Lormont, France
- Laid down: May 1917
- Renamed: Maurice Callot 23 June 1920
- Namesake: Pierre Félix Maurice Callot (1873–1910), French naval officer
- Launched: 26 March or 23 June 1921 (see text)
- Completed: 1922
- Commissioned: 1922 or 8 November 1923 (see text)
- Decommissioned: 1936
- Stricken: 28 January 1938
- Identification: No pennant number
- Fate: Sold 24 November 1938; Scrapped

General characteristics
- Class & type: Unique minelayer submarine
- Displacement: 931 long tons (946 t) (surfaced); 1,298 long tons (1,319 t) (submerged)
- Length: 75.5 m (247 ft 8 in)
- Beam: 6.7 m (22 ft 0 in)
- Draft: 3.57 m (11 ft 9 in)
- Propulsion: 2 x Schneider two-stroke diesel engines, 2,900 hp (2,163 kW); 2 x Schneider electric motors, 1,640 hp (1,223 kW); Two screws
- Speed: 16.5 knots (30.6 km/h; 19.0 mph) (surfaced); 10.5 knots (19.4 km/h; 12.1 mph) (submerged)
- Range: 2,800 nmi (5,190 km; 3,220 mi) at 11 knots (20 km/h; 13 mph) (surface); 118 nmi (219 km; 136 mi) at 5 knots (9.3 km/h; 5.8 mph) (submerged)
- Complement: 3 officers, 45 men
- Armament: 4 × 450 mm (18 in) bow torpedo tubes; 2 × 450 mm (18 in) stern torpedo tubes; 8 x torpedoes; 1 × 75 mm (2.95 in) deck gun; 27 x 200 kg (441 lb) mines

Maurice Callot was a French Navy minelayer submarine commissioned in 1922, the first minelayer submarine designed and built in France. She was decommissioned in 1936.

Maurice Callot — originally named Pierre Callot — was named for the commanding officer of the submarine Pluviôse, Lieutenant de vaisseau (Ship-of-the-Line Lieutenant) Pierre Félix Maurice Callot, who perished when Pluviôse was sunk in a collision with the loss with all hands on 26 May 1910.

== Design ==
A double-hulled ocean-going submarine, Maurice Callot was the first minelayer submarine designed and built in France. She was 75.5 metres (247 ft 8 in) long, with a beam of 6.7 metres (22 ft) and a draft of 3.57 metres (11 ft 9 in). Her surface displacement was 931 long tons (946 t), and her submerged displacement was 1,298 long tons (1,319 t). She was propelled on the surface by two Schneider two-stroke diesel engines producing a combined 2,900 horsepower (2,163 kW). Underwater propulsion was provided by two Schneider electric motors producing a combined 1,640 horsepower (1,223 kW). The twin-propeller propulsion system made it possible to reach a speed of 16.5 knots (30.6 km/h; 19.0 mph) on the surface and 10.5 knots (19.4 km/h; 12.1 mph) when submerged. She had a range of 2,800 nautical miles (5,190 km; 3,220 mi) at 11 knots (20 km/h; 13 mph) on the surface and 118 nautical miles (219 km; 136 mi) at 5 knots (9.3 km/h; 5.8 mph) underwater.

Maurice Callot′s main armament consisted of 27 Sautter-Harlé 200-kilogram (441 lb) mines, stored and laid using the Maxime Laubeuf minelaying system. The mines were stowed abaft the conning tower in three lines of nine mines each. The three mine lines were located inside the outer hull and above the inner pressure hull and ballast tanks. Each mine's anchoring weight was stowed on a horizontal axis with the float toward Maurice Callot′s bow. Each mine′s frame had six rollers which rested on two rails made of angle bars attached to the hull. During minelaying operations an "endless" chain running under each of the three lines of mines and driven via gearing by two electric motors pulled the mines in their frames along the rails toward the stern for laying. A the mines travelled aft, they ultimately became inclined 60 degrees from the horizontal before their release. The minelaying system was designed so that Maurice Callot, submerged and making 5 knots (9.3 km/h; 5.8 mph), could lay one mine from each of her three mine lines every 12 seconds, resulting in the individual mines being spaced 30 metres (33 yd; 98 ft) apart after they were laid. She could lay mines simultaneously from all three of her mine lines or from any two of them, and she also could lay each mine line separately. The laying of mines did not appreciably affect her trim.

Rounding out Maurice Callot′s armament were six 450-millimetre (18 in) torpedo tubes, four internal at the bow and two at the stern, a total of eight torpedoes, and a 75-millimetre (2.95 in) deck gun. Her crew consisted of three officers and 45 petty officers and seamen.

During Maurice Callot′s service life, her minelaying system was modified, with the Laubeuf system being replaced by the Fernand Fenaux system, in which the mines were stored in wells placed in external ballast tanks, with a direct release mechanism.

== Construction and commissioning ==
Maurice Callot was ordered with the name Pierre Callot during World War I on 20 March 1917 as part of France's 1917 naval expansion program. Her keel was laid down at Forges et Chantiers de la Gironde, in Lormont, France, in May 1917. She was renamed Maurice Callot on 23 June 1920. She was launched on either 26 March or 23 June 1921, according to different sources.

During Maurice Callot′s sea trials her port bow plane was torn off while she was at sea on 17 August 1921. On 29 August 1921, her starboard bow plane also was torn off at sea. She was completed in 1922. She was commissioned either in 1922 or on 8 November 1923, according to different sources. She had no Q-series pennant number.

== Service history ==
Maurice Callot spent her entire career in the Mediterranean Sea with the 3rd and 7th Submarine Squadrons. On 19 December 1923, she again lost her port bow plane when it was torn off at sea.

The 14 August 1925 edition of the magazine Engineering reported that Maurice Callot had "recently" completed a 50-day endurance test in the Mediterranean Sea.

Maurice Callot suffered serious damage to her port diesel engine on 1 February 1926, and the door of her No. 4 torpedo tube sustained damage while she was at sea on 19 February 1926. One of her crewmen died on 24 June 1926, but sources do not describe the circumstances of his death.

== Disposal ==
Maurice Callot was placed in the "normal reserve" on 21 January 1935. She was decommissioned in 1936. She was condemned and stricken from the navy list on 28 January 1938 and sold at Toulon, France, on 24 November 1938 for scrapping.

== See also ==
- French submarine Pierre Chailley
- Saphir-class submarine (1928)
