= List of ships named Nautilus =

Nautilus may refer to the following ships named after the nautilus:

== Fictional vessels ==
- Nautilus (fictional submarine), the fictional submarine from Jules Verne's novels Twenty Thousand Leagues Under the Seas (1870) and The Mysterious Island (1874)
- Nautilus (spaceship), the fictional luxury space yacht from International Transport Spacelines of Event[0].
- Nautilus (submarine), fictional submarine seen in the film Nautilus (2000)

== Naval ships ==
- HCS Nautilus (1806), a brig of 185 tons (bm) and 14 guns, launched by the Bombay Dockyard in 1806 for the Bombay Marine. In 1815, after the end of the War of 1812, USS Peacock fired on and captured her, killing and wounding a number of her officers and crew, despite being informed that the war had ended. The Americans released Nautilus when her captain proved that the war had indeed ended. Nautilus was wrecked on the Malabar Coast in 1834.
- HMS Nautilus, a number of ships and a submarine of the Royal Navy
- SMS Nautilus, two ships of the Imperial German Navy and one of the Austro-Hungarian Navy
- USS Nautilus, a number of ships and submarines of the United States Navy
- HNLMS Nautilus, a number of ships of the Royal Netherlands Navy
- French submarine Nautilus (1930)
- Spanish corvette Nautilus, a Spanish Navy training ship which circumnavigated the world between 1892 and 1894 while under the command of Fernando Villaamil

== Merchant ships and other civilian vessels ==
- Nautilus (1796 ship), of 204 tons (bm), was built by Nicholson, Horn & Blenkinsop, of South Shields. She was wrecked off Heligoland in March 1849.
- Nautilus, a brig of 60 tons (bm) that under the command of Captain Charles Bishop between 1796 and 1799 sailed in the South Pacific. Bishop purchased her at Amboyna c. November 1796. She visited Tahiti, and then Port Jackson, arriving there in May 1798. From there she sailed to Van Diemen's Land where she took 9,000 seal skins before sailing to China. She returned to Port Jackson from China in September 1801, before sailing to Tahiti in May 1802.
- Nautilus (1800), the first practical submarine, built by Robert Fulton for the French government
- Nautilus, the first motorized Staten Island Ferry from 1817
- SS Nautilus, formerly Activo, built in Hamburg 1913, used for defence duties in the Arabian Sea during World War II
- Nautilus, formerly USS O-12 (SS-73), an O-11-class submarine (1917–1931) used on Hubert Wilkins's and Lincoln Ellsworth's Arctic Expedition of 1931
- MV Nautilus, a 1921 Italian tanker torpedoed in 1942
- SS Nautilus (1922), a German cargo ship lost in a storm in 1962
- EV Nautilus, an exploration vessel (launched 2009)
- UC3 Nautilus, a privately built Danish midget submarine (launched 2009, sunk 2017)

== See also ==
- Nautilus (disambiguation)
- Nautilus (submarine)
