= French submarine Saphir (1928) =

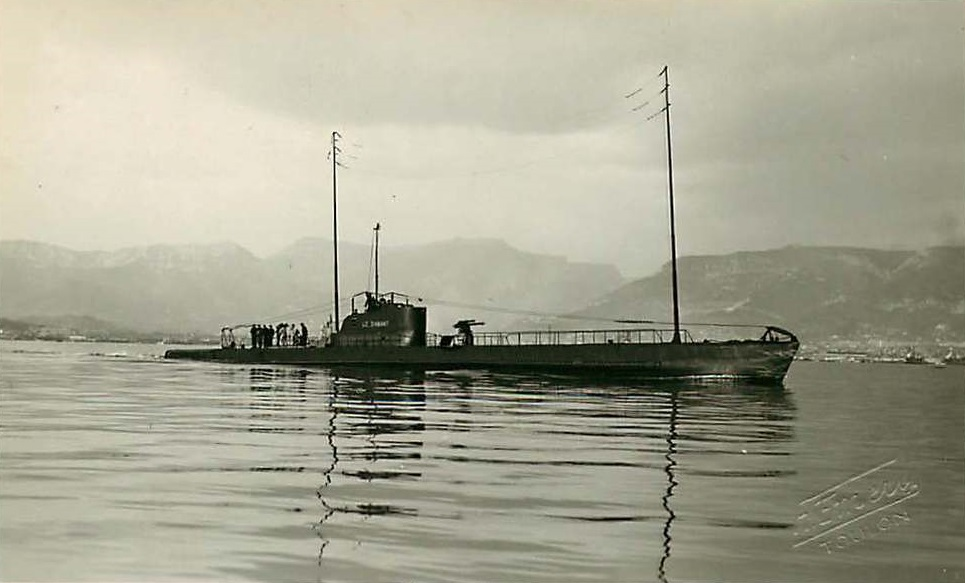
- sister ship Diamant, date unknown

History

France
- Name: Saphir
- Namesake: Sapphire
- Operator: French Navy
- Builder: Arsenal de Toulon
- Laid down: 25 May 1926
- Launched: 20 December 1928
- Commissioned: 30 September 1930
- Fate: Seized by Axis forces 8 December 1942

Italy
- Name: FR 112
- Acquired: 8 December 1942
- Fate: Captured and scuttled by German forces on 15 September 1943

General characteristics
- Class & type: Saphir-class submarine
- Displacement: 761 long tons (773 t) (surfaced); 925 long tons (940 t) (submerged)
- Length: 66 m (216 ft 6 in)
- Beam: 7.1 m (23 ft 4 in)
- Draught: 4.3 m (14 ft 1 in)
- Propulsion: 2 × diesel engines, 1,300 hp (969 kW); 2 × electric motors, 1,100 hp (820 kW)
- Speed: 12 knots (22 km/h) (surfaced); 9 knots (17 km/h) (submerged)
- Range: 7,000 nautical miles (13,000 km) at 7.5 knots (13.9 km/h); 4,000 nautical miles (7,400 km) at 12 knots (22 km/h); 80 nautical miles (150 km) at 4 knots (7.4 km/h) (submerged)
- Test depth: 80 m (260 ft)
- Complement: 42
- Armament: 3 × 550 mm (21.7 in) torpedo tubes; 2 × 400 mm (15.7 in) torpedo tubes; 1 × 75 mm (3.0 in) deck gun; 2 × 13.2 mm (0.52 in) machine guns; 2 × 8 mm (0.31 in) machine guns; 32 × mines

The French submarine Saphir was the lead ship of the Saphir-class submarines built for the French Navy in the mid-1930s. Laid down in May 1926, it was launched in December 1928 and commissioned in September 1930. Saphir was disarmed at Bizerte, Tunisia and renamed FR 112 after being captured there by Italian forces on 8 December 1942. Saphir was seized and scuttled by German forces at Naples, Italy on 15 September 1943.

== Design ==
66 m (216 ft 6 in) long, with a beam of 7.1 m (23 ft 4 in) and a draught of 4.3 m (14 ft 1 in), Saphir-class submarines could dive up to 80 m (260 ft). The submarine had a surfaced displacement of 761 long tons (773 t) and a submerged displacement of 925 long tons (940 t). Propulsion while surfaced was provided by two 1,300 hp (969 kW) Normand-Vickers diesel motors and while submerged two 1,100 hp (820 kW) electric motors. The submarines electrical propulsion allowed it to attain speeds of 9 knots (17 km/h; 10 mph) while submerged. Their surfaced range was 7,000 nautical miles (13,000 km) at 7.5 knots (13.9 km/h), and 4,000 nautical miles (7,400 km) at 12 knots (22 km/h), with a submerged range of 80 nautical miles (150 km) at 4 knots (7.4 km/h).

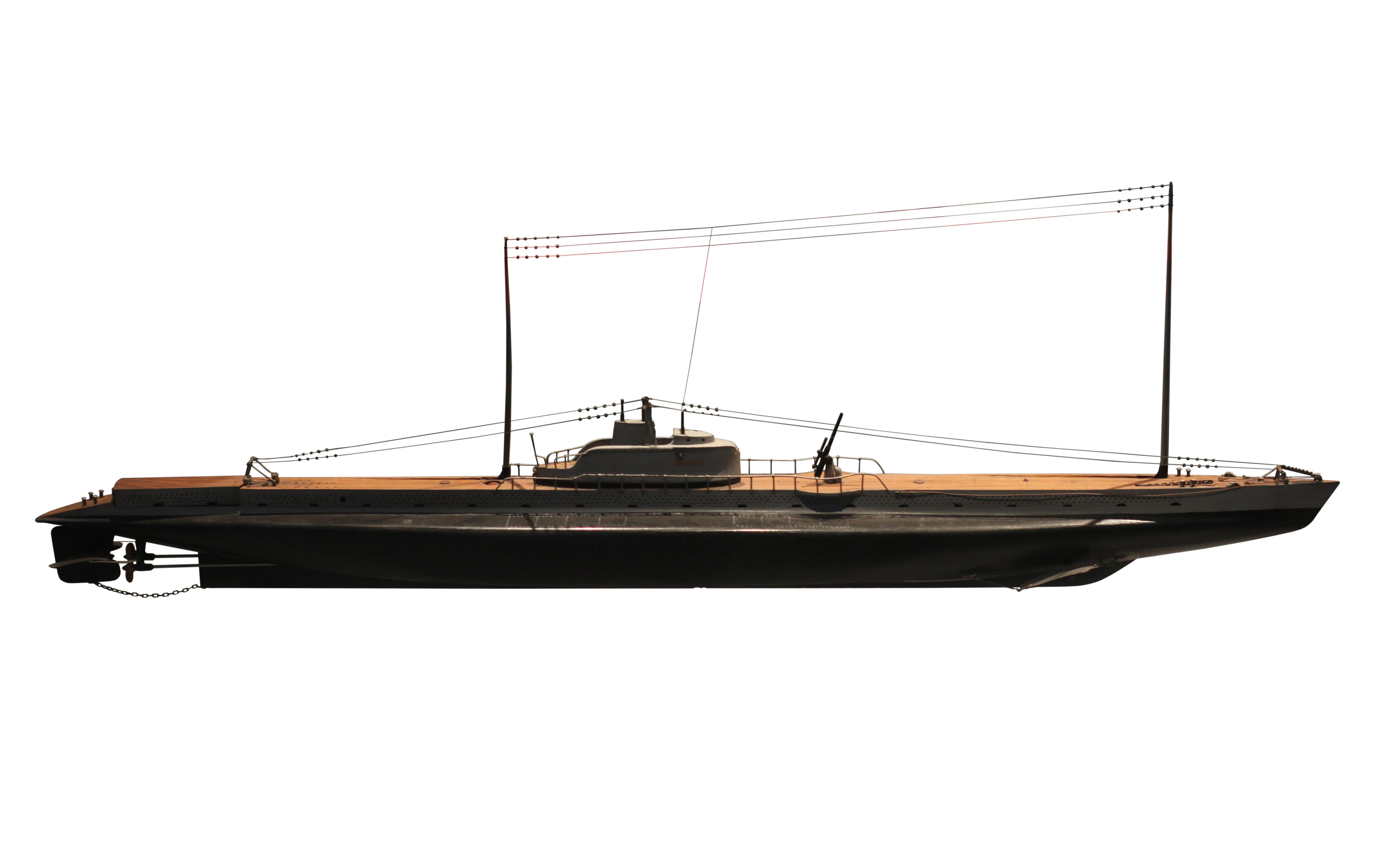
A scale model of Saphir exposed at the Musée national de la Marine

The Saphir-class submarines were constructed to be able to launch torpedoes and lay mines without surfacing. The moored contact mines they used contained 220 kg of TNT and operated at up to 200 meters (660 ft) of depth. They were attached to the submarine's exterior under a hydrodynamic protection and were jettisoned with compressed air. The Saphir-class submarines also featured an automatic depth regulator that automatically flooded ballast tanks after mines were dropped to prevent the risk of the submarine surfacing in the middle of enemy waters.

== See also ==
- List of submarines of France
- French submarines of World War II
