= SMS Nautilus =

In addition to several other ships, two ships of the Imperial German Navy and one ship of the Austro-Hungarian Navy have been named SMS Nautilus, after the Greek word for a sailor.

- SMS Nautilus (1871) was a gunboat built for the Imperial German Navy and launched in 1871 as sister ship to SMS Albatross.
- SMS Nautilus (1873) was a gunboat built for the Austro-Hungarian Navy launched in 1873 with her sister ship SMS Albatross.
- SMS Nautilus (1906) was the first Nautilus-class minelayer built for the Imperial German Navy and launched in 1906.
