= HMS Nautilus =

Several ships of the Royal Navy have been named HMS Nautilus, after the Greek word for a sailor, including:

- HMS Nautilus (1762) was a 16-gun sloop launched in 1762 and put up for sale in 1780
- HMS Nautilus (1784) was a 16-gun sloop launched in 1784 and wrecked in 1799. All 125 men of her crew were saved.
- HMS Nautilus (1804) was an 18-gun sloop launched in 1804 and wrecked in 1807.
- HMS Nautilus (1807) was an 18-gun Cruizer-class brig-sloop launched in 1807 and broken up in 1823
- HMS Nautilus (1830) was a 10-gun Cherokee-class brig-sloop launched in 1830. She became a training ship in 1852, was hulked in 1872 and broken up in 1878
- HMS Nautilus (1879) was an 8-gun training brig launched in 1879 and sold in 1905
- HMS Nautilus (1910) was a Beagle-class destroyer launched in 1910. She was renamed HMS Grampus in 1913 and was sold in 1920
- HMS Nautilus (1914) was a submarine launched in 1914. She was renamed HMS N1 in 1918 and was sold in 1922

== See also ==
- Ships named Nautilus
- HCS Nautilus was launched in 1806 by the Bombay Dockyard for the naval arm of the British East India Company. Nautilus was wrecked in 1834 on the Malabar Coast.
