= HNLMS Nautilus =

HNLMS Nautilus (Dutch: Hr.Ms. or Zr.Ms. Nautilus) may refer to the following ships of the Royal Netherlands Navy:

- HNLMS Nautilus (1929), a unique minelayer sunk during the Second World War
- HNLMS Nautilus (A853), a Cerberus-class diving support vessel
