= USS Nautilus =

USS Nautilus may refer to:

- USS Nautilus (1799), a 12-gun schooner (1799–1812)
- USS Nautilus (1838), a 76-foot coast survey schooner (1838–1859)
- USS Nautilus (SS-168), a Narwhal-class submarine (1930–1945)
- USS Nautilus (SSN-571), the first nuclear submarine (1954–1980)

== See also ==
- Ships named Nautilus
- USS H-2 (SS-29), a H-class submarine (1913–1930) called Nautilus only during construction
- USS Nautilus II (SP-559), a 66-foot patrol/escort (1917–1919)
- USS O-12 (SS-73), an O-11-class submarine (1917–1931) which carried the name Nautilus during a civilian arctic expedition in 1931
- Nautilus, a cephalopod which is the namesake of these vessels
