= Korg Nautilus =

Music workstation

Korg Nautilus Korg Nautilus AT
- Manufacturer: Korg
- Dates: 2021–
- Price: $2,000-$2,700

Technical specifications
- Polyphony: up to 200 voices
- Timbrality: 16
- Synthesis type: Sample-based synthesis, Physical modeling synthesis, Wave sequencing, Frequency modulation synthesis
- Aftertouch expression: No
- Velocity expression: Yes
- Storage memory: 2,560 programs (1920 preloaded), 1,792 combos (256 preloaded), 264 drum kits (104 preloaded), 256 GM2 programs and 9 GM2 drum kits. 60 GB internal mSATA SSD, 4 GB internal RAM (2 GB available for samples)
- Effects: 12 insert effects, 2 master effects, 2 total effects. 197 effect types, 783 presets, 1 EQ per track
- Hardware: Intel Atom D2550 processor on an ASRock IMB-140D-KMD motherboard

Input/output
- Keyboard: Korg Nautilus: 61- and 73-key semi-weighted, and 88-key piano-weighted Korg Nautilus AT: 61-key semi-weighted and 88-key piano-weighted, with channel aftertouch
- External control: Damper pedal, assignable switch, assignable pedal

The Nautilus is a music workstation manufactured by Korg, a successor to Kronos 2, which comes with Kronos' nine different synthesizer sound engines and other similar features. It was announced in November 2020 with availability in January 2021.

Just like its predecessors Kronos and OASYS, the Nautilus is a custom software synthesizer running on an Intel x86 processor and the Linux kernel with RTAI extensions. In comparison to its predecessors, the user interface on the Nautilus has been redesigned, but some software and hardware features of the earlier models are no longer included, with a reduction in list price.

On July 14, 2023 Korg announced an updated Nautilus AT in 61-key and 88-key versions which add channel aftertouch, also available as a factory upgrade option for the original models.

== Sound engines ==
Like its predecessor the Kronos, the Nautilus offers the same nine sound engines:

1) The SGX-2 Premium Piano - sampled acoustic grand piano, using continuous stereo piano samples with 12 velocity layers per key, modeled string resonance and support for soft pedal samples. Preset soundsets include a Steinway-styled "German2 D Piano", Fazioli-styled "Italian F Piano", Yamaha-styled "Japanese Upright U Piano", and "Prepared Piano".

Other soundsets, like Steinway-styled "German D Piano", Yamaha-styled "Japanese C Piano", Bösendorfer-styled "Austrian D Piano" and Bechstein-styled "Berlin D Piano", are available as a user downloaded.

2) The EP-1 MDS Electric Piano - four models based on classic Rhodes electric pianos and two based on Wurlitzer pianos, with control over hammers, tines, reeds, and mechanical noise elements. It also simulates amplifiers, cabinets, speakers, and effects associated with those historic electric pianos.

3) The CX-3 Tonewheel Organ - a classic tonewheel organ based on Korg CX-3, including rotary speaker effects, vibrato and chorus effects, and tube amplifier. Nine hardware sliders on the control panel function as organ drawbar controllers.

4) The HD1 High Definition Synthesizer - sample-based synthesis and wave sequencing to generate sounds from the multisamples stored on an internal solid state drive.

5) The MS-20EX Legacy Analog Collection - an expanded version of the original Korg MS-20 semi-modular monophonic analog synthesizer.

6) The PolysixEX Legacy Analog Collection - an expanded version of the 6-voice Korg Polysix analog synthesizer.

7) The AL-1 Analog Synthesizer - analog subtractive synthesis, with a range of oscillator waveforms, filters, hard sync, analog-style FM, and ring modulation.

8) The MOD-7 Waveshaping VPM Synthesizer - classic FM sounds, SysEx compatibility with Yamaha DX7, Variable Phase Modulation (VPM), waveshaping, ring modulation, samples, subtractive synthesis, and modular patching.

9) The STR-1 Plucked Strings - emulates the physical properties of struck or plucked string sounds, like guitar, harpsichord and clavinet, harp, and bell sounds.

== Hardware ==
The Nautilus comes in versions with 61- and 73-key synth action and 88-key RH3 graded hammer action keyboards; all keyboards are only touch sensitive, and aftertouch sensing is not included. On previous models, keyboards were aftertouch sensitive, and 73-key version used a graded hammer action keyboard.

Nautilus AT, released in 2023, has two versions with 61-key synth action and 88-key RH3 graded hammer action; both of them include channel aftertouch. Korg also offers a factory upgrade service for the original Nautilus models.

Comparing to the Kronos, the touchscreen size was reduced to 7" and KARMA algorithmic arpeggiator from the Korg KARMA is no longer included. Instead, the Nautilus comes with dual arpeggiator equipped with 5 presets and 2,048 slots (1,593 preloaded) for ARP A and 128 slots for ARP B, as well as 1,272 slots for preset drum track patterns and 1000 user slots.
