= Saphir-class submarine (1928) =

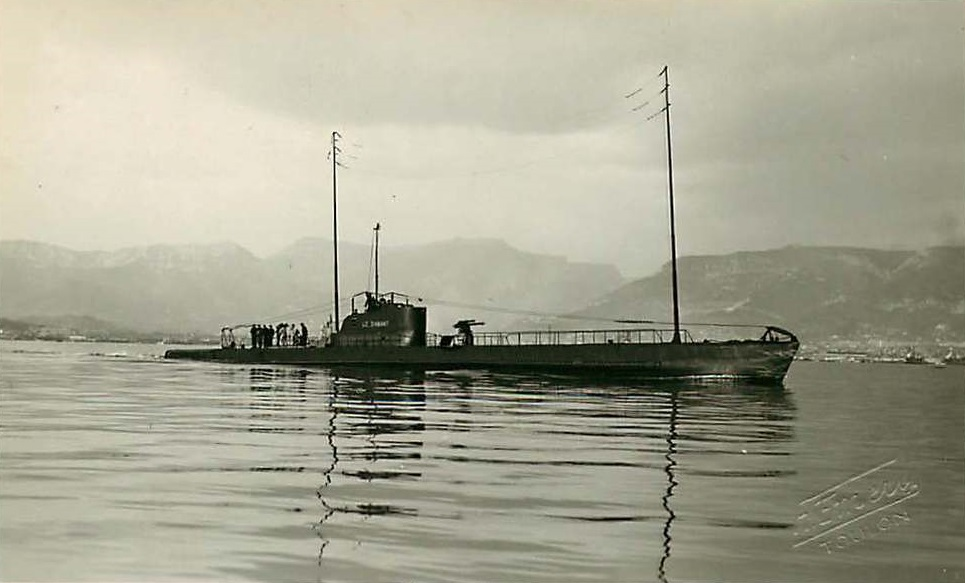
- Diamant, date unknown

Class overview
- Name: Saphir class
- Builders: Arsenal de Toulon
- Operators: French Navy; Free French Naval Forces; Vichy French Navy
- Built: 1926–1935
- In service: 1930–1949
- Completed: 6
- Lost: 1
- Retired: 5

General characteristics
- Type: Submarine
- Displacement: 761 long tons (773 t) (surfaced); 925 long tons (940 t) (submerged)
- Length: 66 m (216 ft 6 in)
- Beam: 7.1 m (23 ft 4 in)
- Draught: 4.3 m (14 ft 1 in)
- Propulsion: 2 × diesel engines, 1,300 hp (969 kW); 2 × electric motors, 1,100 hp (820 kW)
- Speed: 12 knots (22 km/h) (surfaced); 9 knots (17 km/h) (submerged)
- Range: 7,000 nautical miles (13,000 km) at 7.5 knots (13.9 km/h); 4,000 nautical miles (7,400 km) at 12 knots (22 km/h); 80 nautical miles (150 km) at 4 knots (7.4 km/h) (submerged)
- Test depth: 250 ft (76 m)
- Complement: 42 men
- Armament: 3 × 550 mm (21.7 in) torpedo tubes; 2 × 400 mm (15.7 in) torpedo tubes; 1 × 75 mm (3.0 in) deck gun; 2 × 13.2 mm (0.52 in) machine guns; 2 × 8 mm (0.31 in) machine guns; 32 × mines

The Saphir-class submarines were a class of six submarines built in France between 1926 and 1935 for the French Navy. Most saw action during World War II for the Vichy French Navy or the Free French Naval Forces. Three were captured by Italian forces but not used.

== Design ==
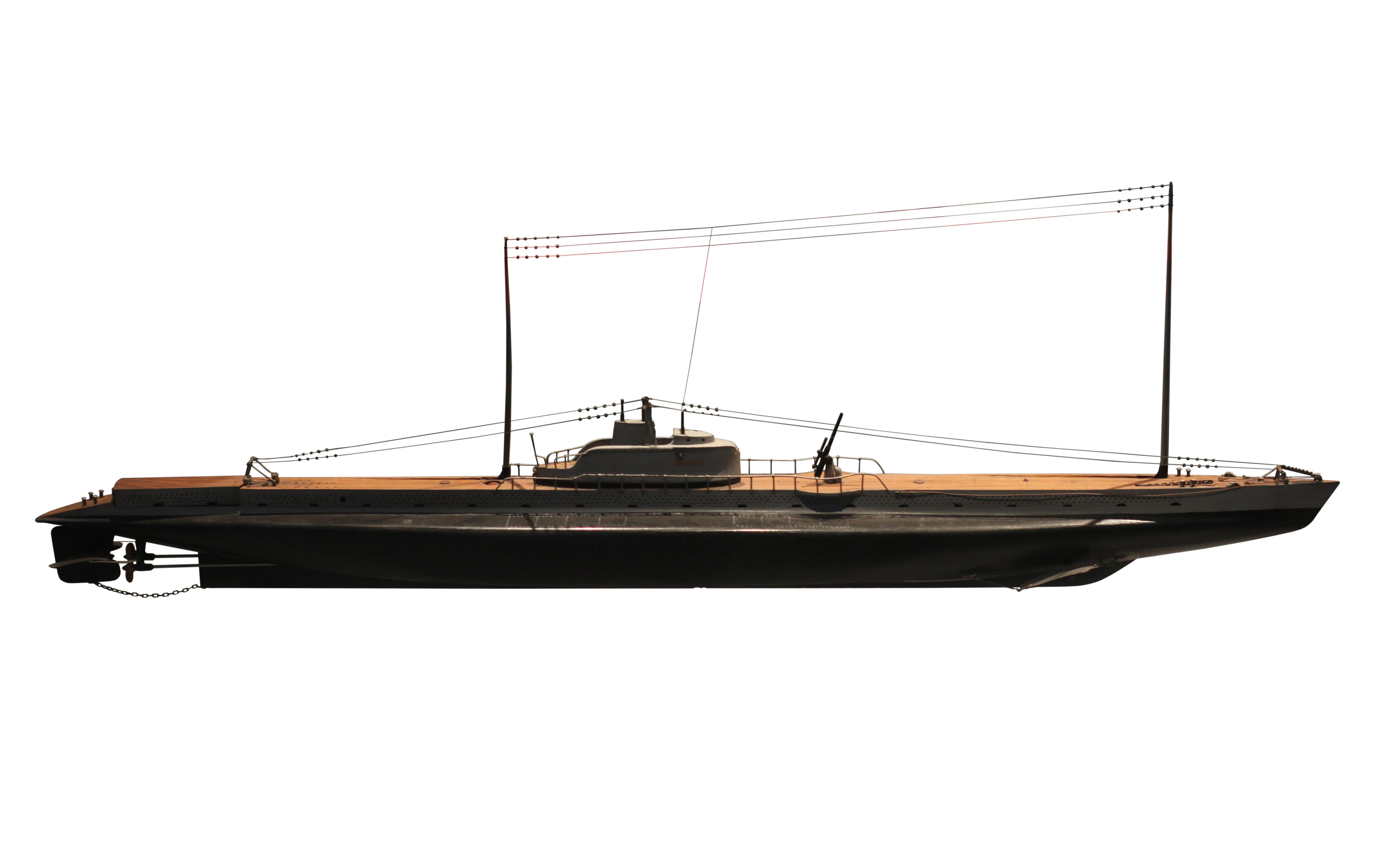
A scale model of Saphir displayed at the Musée national de la Marine

Saphir-class submarines had a surfaced displacement of 761 long tons (773 t) and a submerged displacement of 925 long tons (940 t). Their dimensions were 66 m (216 ft 6 in) long, with a beam of 7.1 m (23 ft 4 in) and a draught of 4.3 m (14 ft 1 in). Propulsion while surfaced was provided by two Normand-Vickers diesel motors with a total of 1,300 bhp (969 kW) and while submerged by two electric motors providing a total of 1,000 hp (746 kW) through two shafts enabling a maximum speed of 12 knots (22 km/h; 14 mph) while surfaced and 9 knots (17 km/h; 10 mph) while submerged. Their bunkers of 95 long tons (97 t) of oil fuel gave them a surfaced range of 7,000 nautical miles (13,000 km) at 7.5 knots (13.9 km/h), and 4,000 nautical miles (7,400 km) at 12 knots (22 km/h) and their batteries a submerged range of 80 nautical miles (150 km) at 4 knots (7.4 km/h). They carried a complement of 42 men. Saphir-class submarines could dive up to 250 ft (76 m).

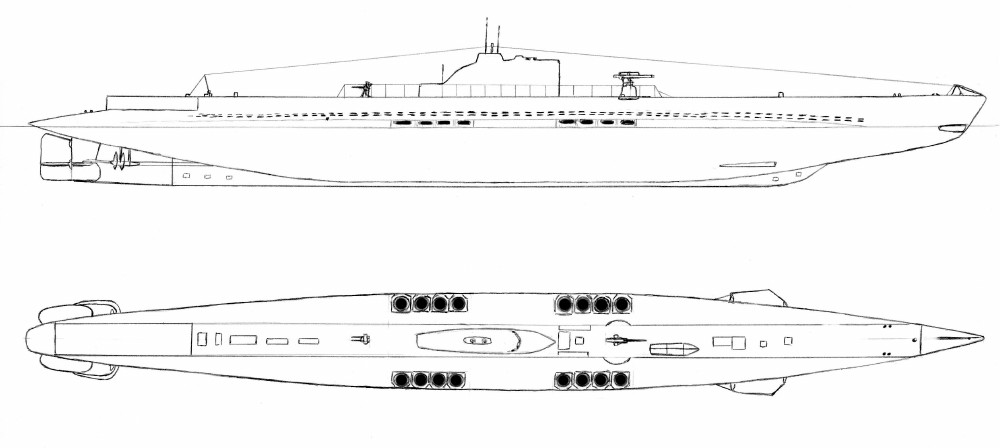
Drawing of a Saphir-class submarine. The black circles in bottom view are the vertical mine launchers

The Saphir-class submarines were designed to launch torpedoes and lay mines without surfacing. The moored contact mines they could lay contained 220 kilograms (485 lb) of TNT and could be laid in up to 200 metres (656 ft) of water. They were attached to the submarine's exterior under a hydrodynamic protection and were jettisoned with compressed air.

== Ships ==
Saphir-class submarines
Name	Laid down	launched	commissioned	fate
Saphir	25 May 1926	20 December 1928	30 September 1930	Captured by Italian forces on 8 December 1942, renamed FR 112. Seized by German forces on 15 September 1943 in Naples and scuttled.
Turquoise	20 October 1926	16 May 1929	10 September 1930	Captured by Italian forces on 8 December 1942, renamed FR 116. Sunk on 6 May 1943 off Tunisia. Subsequently, salved and sold for scrap on 12 August 1947.
Nautilus	8 August 1927	21 March 1930	15 July 1931	Laid down on the centenary of the birth of Jules Verne. Captured by Italian forces on 8 December 1942, then sunk by an air attack on 31 January 1943 at Bizerte. Subsequently, salved and sold for scrap on 12 August 1947.
Rubis	3 April 1929	30 September 1931	4 April 1933	Used successfully by the Free French Forces from 1940, stricken from the naval register 4 October 1949 and scuttled in the Mediterranean Sea in 1958.
Diamant	21 July 1930	18 May 1933	20 June 1934	Scuttled on 27 November 1942, at Toulon, refloated in March 1943 by Italy but sunk again in 1944.
Perle	21 July 1931	30 July 1935	1 March 1937	Used by the Allies after Operation Torch, sunk on 8 July 1944 by a British plane after being mistaken for a German U-boat at 55°27' North, 33°50' West.

== Service ==
During the war, five Saphir-class ships operated in the Mediterranean Sea and only Rubis operated with the Home Fleet. Later, she joined the ranks of the Free French Naval Forces. During its service on the side of the Allies, Rubis was a very effective ship. From April 1940 to the end of 1944, it carried out 22 mine laying operations in the waters off Norway. 15 ships sank on its mines, including minesweepers, 4 small warships, and submarines. In addition, it sank one ship with torpedoes. Only one ship in the Mediterranean Sea changed sides to join the Allies, Perle, which on 8 July 1944 was mistakenly sunk in the Atlantic by an Allied plane.

Of the remaining submarines, Diamant was scuttled at Toulon on 27 November 1942; Nautilus, Saphir and Turquoise were demobilized in Bizerte between 1941 and 1942. After the occupation of Tunis by Axis troops, they were taken over by Italians in December 1942. Saphir was renamed "FR 112", and Turquoise, "FR 116". These ships were unusable and disarmed, remaining in Bizerte until the end of activities in Africa. Shortly before surrendering, the Italians sank them. Only Rubis survived the war and was withdrawn from service on 4 October 1949.

== See also ==
- List of submarines of France

== Bibliography ==
- Moulin, Jean (October–November 2022). "Les sous-marins mouilleurs de mine type Saphir" [The Saphir-Class Minelaying-Submarines]. Navires & Histoire (in French) (133): 88–95. ISSN 1280-4290.
