= Brummer-class cruiser =

Class of light cruisers of the German Imperial Navy

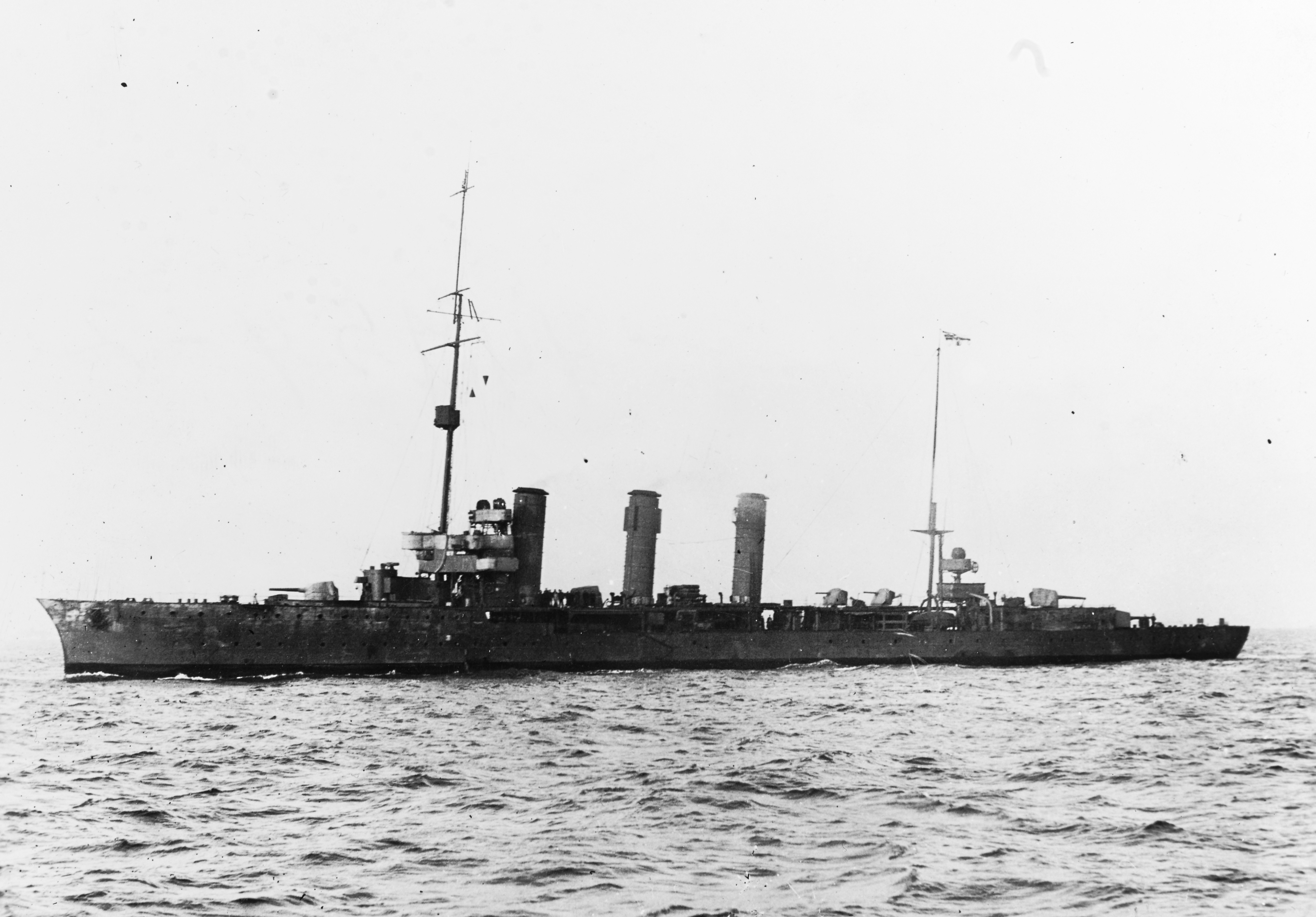
- One of the Brummer-class cruisers, probably on the way to Scapa Flow

Class overview
- Builders: AG Vulcan Stettin
- Operators: Imperial German Navy
- Preceded by: Nautilus-class minelayers; Königsberg-class cruisers
- Succeeded by: Cöln class
- Built: 1915–1916
- In commission: 1916-1919
- Completed: 2

General characteristics
- Type: Minelaying light cruiser
- Displacement: Normal: 4,385 t (4,316 long tons); Full load: 5,856 t (5,764 long tons)
- Length: 140.40 m (460 ft 8 in)
- Beam: 13.20 m (43 ft 4 in)
- Draft: 6 m (19 ft 8 in)
- Installed power: 6 × water-tube boilers; 33,000 shp (25,000 kW)
- Propulsion: 2 × screw propellers; 2 × steam turbines
- Speed: 28 knots (52 km/h; 32 mph)
- Range: 5,800 nmi (10,700 km; 6,700 mi) at 12 knots (22 km/h; 14 mph)
- Complement: 16 officers; 293 enlisted men
- Armament: 4 × 15 cm (5.9 in) SK L/45 guns; 2 × 8.8 cm (3.5 in) SK L/45 AA guns; 2 × 50 cm (19.7 in) torpedo tubes; 400 mines
- Armor: Belt: 40 mm (1.6 in); Deck: 15 mm (0.59 in); Conning tower: 100 mm (3.9 in)

The Brummer class consisted of two light mine-laying cruisers built for the Imperial German Navy in World War I: SMS Brummer and SMS Bremse. When the war broke out, the Germans had only two older mine-laying cruisers. Although most German cruisers were fitted for mine-laying, a need for fast specialized ships existed. The Imperial Russian Navy had ordered sets of steam turbines for the first two ships of the Svetlana-class cruisers from the AG Vulcan shipyard in Stettin. This machinery was confiscated on the outbreak of war and used for these ships. Both vessels were built by AG Vulcan.

The two ships laid a series of minefields during their career, though their most significant success came in October 1917, when they attacked a British convoy to Norway. They sank two escorting destroyers and nine of the twelve merchant ships from the convoy. They escaped back to Germany without damage. The two ships were interned at Scapa Flow after the end of the war, and were subsequently scuttled by their crews on 21 June 1919. Brummer was sunk in deep water and was never raised, but the wreck of Bremse was sold to Cox & Danks on 28 October 1925, raised on 27 November 1929, and broken up at Lyness during 1929–1931.

== Design and construction ==
In 1913, AG Vulcan in Stettin received a contract to build a set of four high-powered steam turbines for the Russian Navy for use in their new light cruiser Svetlana, then under construction in Russia. After the outbreak of World War I in August 1914, which saw Germany and Russia on opposing sides, the German government prevented the delivery of the turbines. AG Vulcan initially offered to design two 'torpedo boat catchers' around the turbines (two per vessel), but the Reichsmarineamt (RMA—Imperial Naval Office) rejected the idea in October. Instead, the Construction Department of the RMA preferred using the turbines to power a pair of fast minelayers, as at that time, the Kaiserliche Marine possessed only two vessels equipped exclusively for mine-laying operations, Nautilus and Albatross. Existing light cruisers could not be used for the purpose as there were no such vessels not already assigned to other tasks. (Note: A long-standing myth surrounds the origins of the turbines for the Brummer class. Many authors have repeated the claim that the turbines in question had been ordered for the Borodino-class battlecruiser Navarin, but according to the historians Dodson & Nottelmann, this is impossible from an engineering standpoint, as Navarin received Parsons style turbines, which used sets of high- and low-pressure turbines to drive different screw propellers, which would have been impossible to divide between two ships. They point out that the Brummers received Curtis-style turbines, which combined high- and low-pressure turbines on each propeller shaft. Moreover, according to surviving records, Dodson & Nottelmann point out that Navarin's turbines had been ordered from the Franco-Russian Works in Saint Petersburg, not AG Vulcan.)

The Construction Department prepared an initial proposal, which it submitted during a meeting of the RMA on 11 November. Admiral Alfred von Tirpitz initially disagreed with the idea, preferring minelaying submarines instead, but the department heads decided to proceed with the cruiser proposal over his objection. Tirpitz eventually agreed on 5 December, and six days later AG Vulcan received the initial outline of the proposal. On 23 December, the RMA placed the formal order with Vulcan, which specified the general parameters for the new ships but left design specifics to Vulcan's internal design staff. The order called for ships of about 2,800 metric tons (2,756 long tons; 3,086 short tons), an armament of six 10.5 cm (4.1 in) guns, a capacity of 200 naval mines, and a cruising radius of 1,800 to 2,000 nautical miles (3,300 to 3,700 km; 2,100 to 2,300 mi).

In early 1915, the Admiralstab (Admiralty Staff) joined the discussion over the new ships, and they pointed out the proposed endurance was far too low for offensive minelaying operations in the North Sea. The RMA concurred with the assessment on 19 January and informed Vulcan four days later that the design would have to be revised. The Construction Department issued new specifications on 2 February, by which time displacement had grown to 4,300 t (4,200 long tons; 4,700 short tons), the armament had increased to four 15 cm (5.9 in) guns, the number of mines to a minimum of 300, and the cruising radius to 3,200 nmi (5,900 km; 3,700 mi). Tirpitz and Kaiser Wilhelm II issued their approval to the revised specifications between 12 and 23 February, though authorization for Vulcan to begin construction was issued on the 15th.

Design work on the ships was completed in February 1915. The new ships would be capable of mining an area under cover of darkness and quickly returning to port before they could be intercepted. They were designed to resemble the British Arethusa-class cruisers to aid in their ability to operate off the British coast. During construction, the shape of their bow and its resemblance to British cruisers was covered by sheet metal to conceal their appearance.

=== General characteristics ===
Brummer and Bremse were 135 meters (442 ft 11 in) long at the waterline and 140.4 m (460 ft 8 in) long overall. They had a beam of 13.2 m (43 ft 4 in) and a draft of 6 m (19 ft 8 in) forward and 5.88 m (19 ft 3 in) aft. The ships had a designed displacement of 4,385 metric tons (4,316 long tons), and at full load, they displaced 5,856 t (5,764 long tons). Their hulls were built with longitudinal steel frames. The hulls were divided into twenty-one watertight compartments and incorporated a double bottom that extended for forty-four percent of the length of the keel. Brummer differed slightly, as she had a row of portholes amidships that her sister Bremse did not have.

Brummer and Bremse were fitted with masts similar to the British Arethusa-class cruisers, and similarly to the British ships, the masts could be lowered and stored on the superstructure deck. Their bow was also modeled on the Arethusa-class ships to further disguise the vessels. The ships had a complement of 16 officers and 293 enlisted men. They carried several smaller vessels, including one picket boat, one barge, and two dinghies. The German Navy regarded the ships as excellent sea boats, having gentle motion. The ships were highly maneuverable and had a tight turning radius, and only lost slight speed in a head sea. In hard turns, they lost up to sixty percent speed. They were very crank, however.

=== Machinery ===
The two ships' propulsion systems consisted of two AEG-Vulcan turbines powered by two coal-fired Marine Doppelkessel double-ended water-tube boilers and four oil-fired Öl-Marine double-ended boilers. The turbines drove a pair of three-bladed screw propellers, which were 3.20 m (10 ft 6 in) in diameter. The engines were rated at 33,000 shaft horsepower (25,000 kW) for a top speed of 28 knots (52 km/h; 32 mph). On trials, Brummer reached 42,797 shp (31,914 kW) while Bremse made 47,748 shp (35,606 kW); they averaged a top speed of 30.2 knots (55.9 km/h; 34.8 mph) with a light load. The ships were capable of speeds up to 34 knots (63 km/h; 39 mph), though only in short bursts.

Coal storage was 300 t (300 long tons; 330 short tons) as designed, though up to 600 t (590 long tons; 660 short tons) could be carried. Fuel oil was initially 500 t (490 long tons; 550 short tons), and could be similarly increased to 1,000 t (980 long tons; 1,100 short tons). At a cruising speed of 12 kn (22 km/h; 14 mph), the ships could steam for 5,800 nmi (10,700 km; 6,700 mi). At a higher speed of 25 kn (46 km/h; 29 mph), the range fell considerably, to 1,200 nmi (2,200 km; 1,400 mi). Electrical power was provided by two turbo generators and one diesel generator. Steering was controlled by a single, large rudder.

=== Armament and armor ===
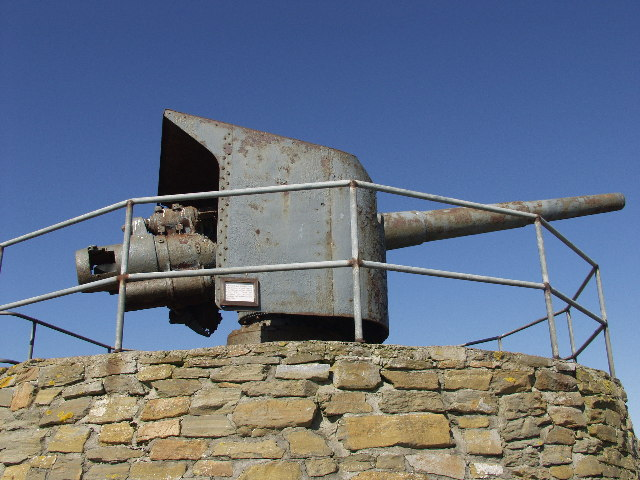
One of Bremse's 15 cm guns salvaged at Scapa Flow

The ships were armed with four 15 cm (5.9 in) SK L/45 guns in single pedestal mounts; all four were placed on the centerline so all four guns could fire on the broadside. One was placed forward on the forecastle, a second was located between the first and second funnel and two were arranged in a superfiring pair aft. These guns fired a 45.3-kilogram (100 lb) shell at a muzzle velocity of 840 meters per second (2,800 ft/s). The guns had a maximum elevation of 30 degrees, which allowed them to engage targets out to 17,600 m (57,742 ft 9 in). They were supplied with 600 rounds of ammunition, for 150 shells per gun. Brummer and Bremse also carried two 8.8 cm (3.5 in) SK L/45 anti-aircraft guns mounted on the centerline astern of the funnels. These guns fired a 10 kg (22 lb) shells at a muzzle velocity of 750 to 770 m/s (2,500 to 2,500 ft/s). The ships were also equipped with a pair of 50 cm (19.7 in) torpedo tubes with four torpedoes in a swivel mount amidships. Designed as mine-layers, they carried up to 450 mines, depending on the type. Two rails ran down the main deck to the stern to allow the mines to be dropped behind the ship.

The Brummer-class cruisers' armor was fabricated from Krupp cemented steel. The ships were protected by a waterline armored belt that was 40 mm (1.6 in) thick amidships; the bow and stern were not armored. The deck was covered with 15 mm (0.59 in) thick armor plate. Gun shields 50 mm (2 in) thick protected the 15 cm gun battery crews. The conning tower had 100 mm (3.9 in) thick sides and a 20 mm (0.79 in) thick roof. Atop the conning tower was the bridge, which included a splinter-proof chart house. All three funnels were equipped with a steel glacis for splinter protection.

== Construction ==
Mine Steamer C (to be Brummer) was laid down at the AG Vulcan shipyard in Stettin on 24 April 1915. Work proceeded quickly, and the ship was launched on 11 December 1915. After the completion of fitting-out work, the ship was commissioned into the High Seas Fleet on 2 April 1916. Mine Steamer D (Bremse) followed her sister onto the ways at AG Vulcan three days later. She was launched on 11 March 1916 and completed in less than four months; the ship was commissioned into the fleet on 1 July 1916.

Construction data
Name	Builder	Laid down	Launched	Completed
Brummer	AG Vulcan, Stettin	24 April 1915	11 December 1915	2 April 1916
Bremse	AG Vulcan, Stettin	27 April 1915	11 March 1915	1 July 1916

== Service ==
After their commissioning, Brummer and Bremse served with the High Seas Fleet, including on a sortie into the North Sea in October 1916. The ships laid a minefield off Norderney in January 1917 and guarded minesweepers between March and May that year. In October 1917, Admiral Reinhard Scheer sent the two ships to attack a British convoy to Norway to divert forces protecting convoys in the Atlantic. Scheer chose Brummer and Bremse because of their high speed and large radius of action. Shortly after dawn on 17 October, the two cruisers attacked the convoy, which consisted of twelve merchant ships, two destroyers, and two armed trawlers. In the ensuing action off Lerwick, the German ships quickly sank the escorting destroyers and nine of the twelve cargo vessels. The British Admiralty was not informed of the attack until Brummer and Bremse were safely steaming back to Germany.

Along with the most modern units of the High Seas Fleet, Brummer and Bremse were included in the ships specified for internment at Scapa Flow by the victorious Allied powers. The ships steamed out of Germany on 21 November 1918 in single file, commanded by Rear Admiral Ludwig von Reuter. Reuter believed that the British intended to seize the German ships on 21 June 1919, and so he ordered the ships to be sunk at the next opportunity. On the morning of 21 June, the British fleet left Scapa Flow to conduct training maneuvers, and at 11:20 Reuter transmitted the order to scuttle his ships. Brummer sank at 13:05; she was never raised for scrapping and remains on the bottom of Scapa Flow. Bremse sank at 14:30 and was ultimately raised on 27 November 1929 and broken up for scrap from December 1929 to May 1931 at Lyness. The salvage rights to the wreck of Brummer passed through various hands between 1962 and 1981; ownership of the wreck was transferred from the Ministry of Defence (United Kingdom) to Orkney Islands Council in 1985; the wreck was declared a scheduled monument on 23 May 2001.
