= Soviet cruiser Krasny Krym =

Soviet Svetlana-class cruiser

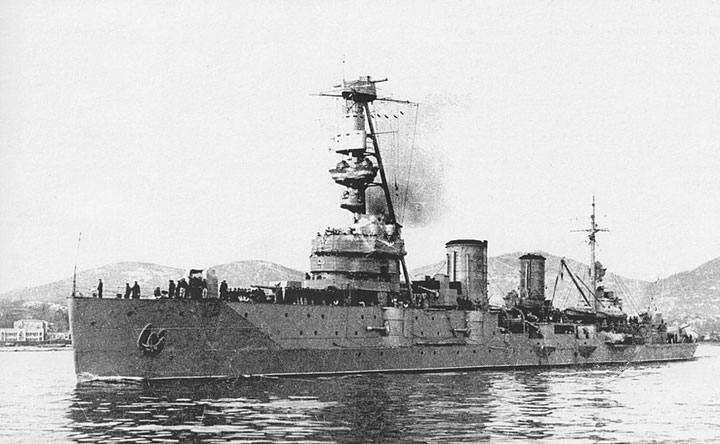
- Krasny Krym at anchor

History

Soviet Union
- Name: Krasny Krym
- Builder: Russo-Baltic Shipyard, Reval (Tallinn), Estonia
- Laid down: 7 December 1913
- Launched: 27 November 1915
- Acquired: November 1917
- Commissioned: 1 July 1928
- Renamed: 31 October 1939 from Profintern
- Reclassified: November 1954 as training ship
- Stricken: July 1959
- Honours and awards: Awarded Guards title, 18 June 1942
- Fate: Scrapped, July 1959

General characteristics (1928)
- Class & type: Svetlana-class cruiser
- Displacement: 6,839 t (6,731 long tons) (standard); 7,999 t (7,873 long tons) (deep load)
- Length: 158.4 m (519 ft 8 in)
- Beam: 15.35 m (50 ft 4 in)
- Draught: 6.65 m (21 ft 10 in)
- Installed power: 13 Yarrow water-tube boilers; 50,000 shp (37,000 kW)
- Propulsion: 4 shafts, 4 direct-drive steam turbines
- Speed: 29 knots (54 km/h; 33 mph)
- Range: 3,350 nmi (6,200 km; 3,860 mi) at 14 knots (26 km/h; 16 mph)
- Complement: 850
- Armament: 15 × single 130 mm (5.1 in) B7 Pattern 1913 guns; 9 × single 76 mm (3.0 in) AA guns; 2 × triple 450 mm (18 in) torpedo tubes; 100 mines
- Armor: Upper and lower armored decks: 20 mm (0.79 in) each; Gun shields: 25 mm (0.98 in); Lower armor belt: 76 mm (3.0 in); Upper armor belt: 25 mm (0.98 in); Conning tower: 76 mm (3.0 in)

Krasny Krym (Russian: Красный Крым – Red Crimea) was a light cruiser of the Soviet Navy. She was laid down in 1913 as Svetlana for the Imperial Russian Navy, the lead ship of the Svetlana class. She was built by the Russo-Baltic Shipyard in Tallinn, Estonia, and launched in 1915. Her hull was evacuated to Petrograd when the Germans approached the port in late 1917 and laid up incomplete during the Russian Revolution. The ship was completed by the Soviets in 1926. During World War II she supported Soviet troops during the Siege of Odessa, Siege of Sevastopol, and the Kerch-Feodosiya Operation in the winter of 1941–42. Krasny Krym was awarded the Guards title on 18 June 1942. The ship was reclassified as a training ship in November 1954 before being scrapped in July 1959.

== Construction ==
While the ship was built by the Russo-Baltic Shipyard in Tallinn, Estonia, her four direct-drive turbines, and half the boilers, were ordered from AG Vulcan Stettinin Germany. These were not delivered owing to the outbreak of World War I, and were used to engine the German Brummer-class cruisers. As a result, new engines had to be ordered from the UK, delaying construction.

When Svetlana was towed from Tallinn to St. Petersburg in November 1917 she was about 90% complete and the Soviets expected to commission her in 1919, but she was laid up incomplete due to the disruptions of the Russian Civil War. It wasn't until November 1924 that work recommenced on her and she was renamed Profintern (Russian: Профинтерн) on 5 February 1925. She was completed in October 1926, but she had to return to the dockyard to remedy numerous problems and wasn't commissioned until 1 July 1928.

== Service history ==
Profintern was completed to nearly her original design, but was modified to handle aircraft by adding cranes on either side of the middle funnel and a parking area was built for them between the central and rear funnels, although no catapult was ever fitted. Her original internal torpedo tubes were replaced by two triple 450-millimetre (18 in) torpedo tubes mounted on the deck abaft the rear funnel. And her original four 38-caliber 2.5-inch (64 mm) anti-aircraft guns were replaced by nine 30-caliber 3-inch (76 mm) Lender AA guns.

Initially based in the Baltic she was transferred to the Black Sea Fleet in 1929, arriving on 18 January 1930, together with the battleship Parizhskaya Kommuna. She was extensively overhauled in the late 1930s where her aircraft equipment was removed and she was fitted with new fire control equipment. The ship was given three Italian Minizini twin-gun 100 mm (3.9 in) 47 caliber anti-aircraft mounts, one was placed on the forecastle, in front of the forward 130 mm (5.1 in) B7 Pattern 1913 gun and the other two on each side of the quarterdeck. Four single mounts for the semi-automatic 45-millimetre (1.8 in) 21-K gun were fitted as well as seven 12.7-millimetre (0.50 in) AA machine guns. At some point she exchanged her 21-K AA guns for ten single mounts for the naval version of the 37 mm automatic air defense gun M1939 (61-K). Profintern was renamed Krasny Krym on 31 October 1939.

== World War II ==
Krasny Krym provided gunfire support to Soviet forces defending Odessa and escorted convoys bringing the 157th Rifle Division into Odessa during the month of September 1941. She also transported two battalions of the 3rd Marine Regiment from Sevastopol in a successful amphibious assault behind Romanian lines to destroy Romanian coastal batteries near Fontanka and Dofinovka. She escorted convoys from 3–6 October that evacuated the 157th Rifle Division from Odessa to Sevastopol. During the Siege of Sevastopol, the ship provided gunfire support and evacuated cut-off troops from elsewhere in the Crimea into Sevastopol and brought in reinforcements from Caucasian ports. She helped to transport the 388th Rifle Division from Novorossisk and Tuapse to Sevastopol between 7 and 13 December and the 354th Rifle Division between 21 and 22 December, bombarding German position in the interim.

During the Kerch-Feodosiya Operation, Krasny Krym sailed into the harbor of Feodosiya on 29 December 1941 and disembarked reinforcements and provided gunfire support for Soviet troops already ashore. She was hit eleven times by Axis artillery and mortar fire in retaliation. Between 15 and 21 January 1942, she landed the bulk of the 266th Mountain Regiment at Sudak and reinforced them with 1576 troops of the 544th Rifle Regiment between 23 and 26 January. During the following months Krasny Krym brought in reinforcements for the garrison of Sevastopol and evacuated the wounded, sometimes bombarding German positions en route, her last such mission being on 3 June 1942, after the Germans had already launched the attack that would force the city to surrender in July. She was awarded the Guards title on 18 June in recognition of her performance.

Krasny Krym and the destroyer Nezamozhnik evacuated 2000 men from Novorossisk to Batumi between 9–12 August, a regiment of the 32nd Guards Rifle Division on 12–13 August and a further 1,850 men and 60 tons of supplies on 16–17 August 1942. Between 8–11 September Krasny Krym and several destroyers ferried the 137th and 145th Rifle Regiments along with the 3rd Naval Rifle Brigade from Poti to Tuapse and Gelendzhik. Between 20 and 23 October Krasny Krym, her half-sister Krasny Kavkaz, and three destroyers ferried 12,600 men of the 8th, 9th and 10th Guards Rifle Brigades from Poti to Tuapse to reinforce the defenses there. Krasny Krym, two destroyers and a number of minesweepers transported the 9th Mountain Rifle Division from Batumi to Tuapse from 1–10 December 1942. On the night of 4 February 1943 the Soviets made a series of amphibious landings to the west of Novorossisk, behind German lines. Krasny Krym, Krasny Kavkaz, and three destroyers provided fire support for the main landing, but the Soviet troops there were wiped out by 6 February, although one secondary landing was successful. The loss of three destroyers attempting to interdict the German evacuation of the Taman Bridgehead on 6 October 1943 caused Stalin to forbid the deployment of large naval units without his express permission and this meant the end of Krasny Krym's active participation in the war.

== Post-war career ==
The ship was reclassified as a training ship in 1954. On 7 May 1957, she was redesignated as Experimental Ship OS-20 and then reclassified on 18 March 1959 as Floating Barracks PKZ-144 before being scrapped in July 1959.
