= Östergarn Church =

- Östergarns kyrka
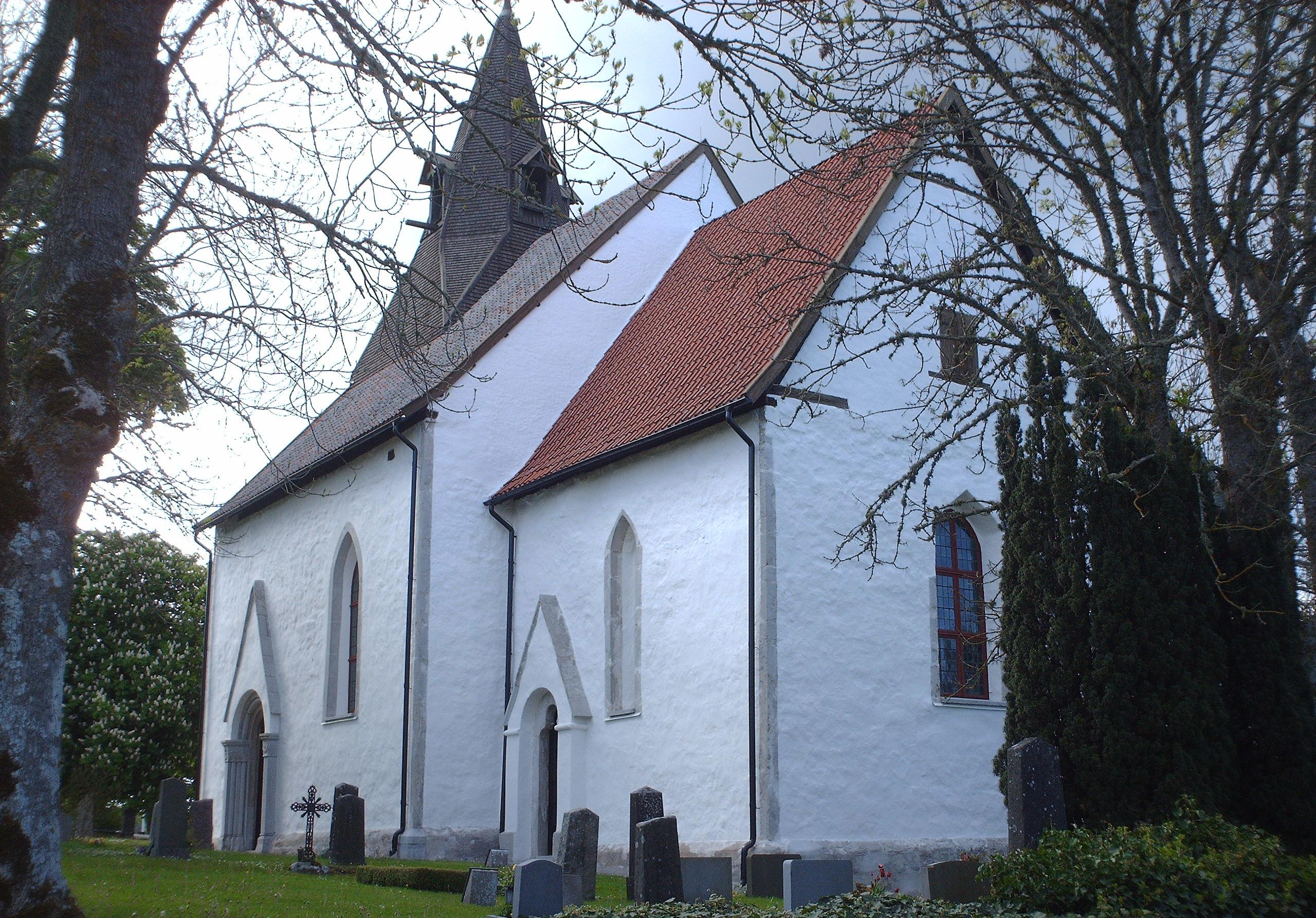
- Östergarn Church

- Location on Gotland
- 57°25′18″N 18°51′31″E
- Country: Sweden
- Denomination: Church of Sweden

Administration
- Diocese: Visby

Östergarn Church (Swedish: Östergarns kyrka) is a medieval church in Östergarn, Gotland, Sweden.

== History and architecture ==
Östergarn Church was built in the middle of the 13th century. Originally a tower was also planned to be built west of the nave, but it was never constructed. A sacristy was added in 1786. The plan of both the nave and the chancel are almost square, which is unusual for churches on Gotland.The church has suffered from a fire in 1565, during the Northern Seven Years' War, and was furthermore pillaged by Russian troops both in 1715 and 1717. No medieval furnishings therefore remain in the church. Instead, these are largely from the 18th century, with the exception of the baptismal font, which from the early 17th century. The facade of the church organ is from 1850, designed by Fredrik Wilhelm Scholander. The cemetery contains a memorial in commemoration of fallen crewmembers from the German minelaying cruiser SMS Albatross which ran aground outside Östergarn after a naval battle in 1915.

== Sources cited ==
- Jacobsson, Britta; Johansson, Eva; Johansson, Per; Andersson, Rolf (1990). Våra kyrkor [Our churches]. Västervik: Klarkullens förlag AB. ISBN 91-971561-08.
- Lagerlöf, Erland; Svahnström, Gunnar (1991). Gotlands kyrkor [Churches of Gotland] (in Swedish) (4th ed.). Stockholm: Rabén & Sjögren. ISBN 91-29-61598-4.
