= Svetlana-class cruiser =

Class of Russian light cruisers

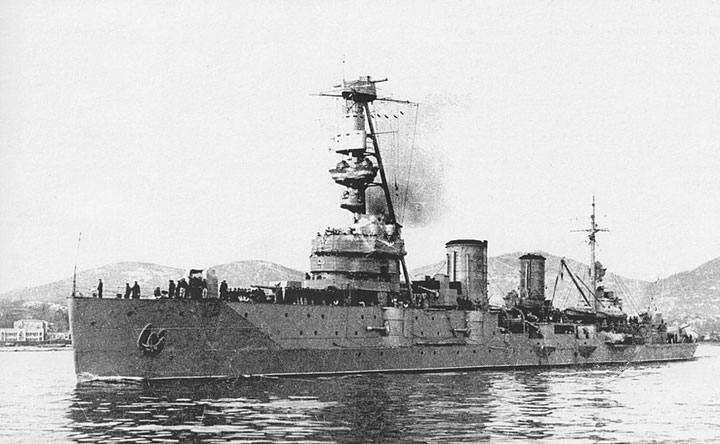
- Krasny Krym at anchor in 1943

Class overview
- Name: Svetlana class
- Builders: Russo-Baltic Shipyard, Estonia; Putilov Shipyard, Saint Petersburg
- Operators: Soviet Navy
- Preceded by: Muraviev Amurski class
- Succeeded by: Admiral Nakhimov class
- Cost: 8,300,000 rubles
- Built: 1913–28
- In commission: 1928–58
- Planned: 4
- Completed: 3 (1 completed as a cruiser)
- Canceled: 1
- Lost: 1
- Scrapped: 2

General characteristics (as designed)
- Type: Light cruiser
- Displacement: 6,860 t (6,750 long tons) (standard)
- Length: 158.4 m (519 ft 8 in)
- Beam: 15.3 m (50 ft 2 in)
- Draught: 5.56 m (18 ft 3 in)
- Installed power: 13 × Yarrow boilers; 50,000 shp (37,000 kW)
- Propulsion: 4 × shafts; 4 × direct-drive steam turbines
- Speed: 29.5 knots (54.6 km/h; 33.9 mph)
- Complement: 630
- Armament: 15 × single 130 mm (5.1 in) guns; 4 × single 63.3 mm (2.5 in) AA guns; 2 × single 450 mm (17.7 in) torpedo tubes; 100 mines
- Armor: Belt: 25–76 mm (0.98–2.99 in); Deck: 20 mm (0.79 in) each; Gun shields: 25 mm (0.98 in); Conning tower: 76 mm (3.0 in)
- Aircraft carried: 1 × seaplane

The Svetlana-class cruiser was the first class of light cruisers built for the Imperial Russian Navy (IRN) during the 1910s. Construction was interrupted by World War I, the Russian Revolution and the Russian Civil War. Only Svetlana of the quartet was completed by the Soviet Union as a cruiser, two were converted to oil tankers, and the remaining ship was scrapped without being completed.

Svetlana, now renamed Profintern, became fully operational in 1928 and was transferred to the Black Sea Fleet the following year. The ship was renamed Krasny Krym in 1939 and supported Soviet troops during the Black Sea Campaigns during World War II. After the war, she became a training ship until the ship was decommissioned in 1958 and broken up two years later.

== Background and design ==
The State Duma had earlier approved construction of modern dreadnought battleships, but the IRN lacked modern cruisers and destroyers. Several years after the first Gangut-class battleships were ordered, the navy finally gained approval for four light cruisers as part of the 1912–1916 shipbuilding program to scout for the capital ships and to lead destroyer flotillas. Design work for the ships had begun as far back as 1907, but it took the IRN several iterations between alternating specifications and designs to decide what was feasible. In early 1912 it conducted a design contest for a 4,100–5,100-metric-ton (4,000–5,000-long-ton) ship armed with a dozen 55-caliber 130-millimeter (5.1 in) Pattern 1913 guns, capable of a speed of 30 knots (56 km/h; 35 mph), and protected by some side armor. Other important requirements were a strong resemblance to the dreadnoughts under construction and the ability to lay mines. None of the submissions were entirely satisfactory, and the shipyards were asked for new, larger, designs. The navy combined the submissions from the Russo-Baltic and Putilov Shipyards for a 6,700-metric-ton (6,600-long-ton) design in November. In February 1913, the IRN needed to divert some money from the cruisers to pay for the Borodino-class battlecruisers and the shipyards agreed to reduce the price from 9,660,000 rubles, excluding guns and armor, to 8,300,000 rubles in exchange for reducing the speed to 29.5 knots (54.6 km/h; 33.9 mph); the navy then ordered two ships from each yard on 13 February. Late changes to the design, including the addition of Frahm anti-roll tanks and provision for a seaplane, added several hundred extra tons to the displacement.

The Svetlana-class ships had an overall length of 158.4 meters (519 ft 8 in), a beam of 15.3 meters (50 ft 2 in), and a draft of 5.56 meters (18 ft 3 in). The ships displaced 6,860 metric tons (6,750 long tons) at normal load. They were powered by four direct-drive Curtis-AEG-Vulkan steam turbines, each driving one propeller shaft, using steam provided by 13 Yarrow boilers. The turbines were designed to produce 50,000 shaft horsepower (37,000 kW), which would propel the ship at 29.5 knots; those for Svetlana and Admiral Greig were ordered from AG Vulcan Stettin in Germany (Admiral Greig subcontracted to Blohm+Voss). These were not delivered owing to the outbreak of World War I, and those intended for Svetlana were used to engine the German Brummer-class cruisers. As a result, new engines had to be ordered from the UK; this delayed Svetlana, and probably prevented Greig's completion as a cruiser. The ships carried 1,167 long tons (1,186 t) of fuel oil. Their crew consisted of approximately 630 officers and crewmen.

The increase in size of the Svetlanas during the design process allowed their main armament to be increased from 12 to 15 Pattern 1913 guns in single mounts. Six of the ten guns on the main deck were positioned in casemates and all were difficult to work in bad weather. The guns had a range of 15,364 meters (16,802 yd) at an elevation of +20° and fired 36.86-kilogram (81.3 lb) projectiles at a muzzle velocity of 823 m/s (2,700 ft/s). The maximum rate of fire was eight rounds per minute. The ships were also armed with four 38-caliber 63.3 mm (2.5 in) anti-aircraft (AA) guns, although their maximum elevation was limited to +75°, two submerged 450 mm (17.7 in) torpedo tubes and could carry 100 mines. During construction, Svetlana's AA guns were replaced by 30-caliber 76.2-millimetre (3 in) Lender AA guns and the rest of the ships were intended to receive 102-millimetre (4 in) AA guns.

The waterline belt of the Svetlana-class ships was 76 millimeters thick. It extended the whole length of the hull and covered from the lower deck to 0.91 meters (3 ft) below the waterline. Above it was a 25-millimeter (1 in) strake of armor that covered the area between the lower and main decks. Those decks were each 20 millimeters (0.79 in) thick and the funnel uptakes were protected by 25 millimeters of armor. The walls of the conning tower were 76 millimeters thick while the gun shields protecting the 130-millimeter guns were 25 millimeters thick.

== Ships ==
Construction data
Name	Russian	Builder	Laid down	Launched	Commissioned	Fate
Krasny Krym (ex-Svetlana, ex-Profintern)	Красный Крым, Светлана, Профинтерн	Russo-Baltic Shipyard, Reval (now Tallinn), Estonia	7 December 1913	27 November 1915	1 July 1928	Scrapped, July 1959
SS Azneft (ex-Admiral Greig)	Адмирал Грейг	Russo-Baltic Shipyard, Reval (now Tallinn), Estonia	7 November 1913	9 December 1916	24 December 1926	
Admiral Butakov	Адмирал Бутаков	Putilov Shipyard, Saint Petersburg	29 November 1913	5 August 1916		Scrapped incomplete
SS Grozneft (ex-Admiral Spiridov)	Адмирал Спиридов	Putilov Shipyard, Saint Petersburg	29 November 1913	9 September 1916	24 December 1926	

== Service ==
Svetlana and her sister ships were evacuated to Petrograd when the Germans approached Reval in late 1917 and were laid up incomplete during the Russian Revolution. The Soviets renamed Svetlana as Profintern in 1922, and removed her original torpedo tubes in exchange for a pair of triple 533-millimeter (21 in) torpedo tubes on the main deck. The ship was completed in 1925, although she required several more years' work to be fully operational. Initially assigned to the Baltic Fleet, Profintern was transferred to the Black Sea Fleet in 1929. She was extensively overhauled in the late 1930s and her anti-aircraft armament was greatly augmented. The ship was renamed Krasnyi Krym upon the completion of her overhaul in 1939. During World War II, she supported Soviet troops during the Siege of Odessa, the Siege of Sevastopol, and the Kerch-Feodosiya Operation in the winter of 1941–1942. The ship was reclassified as a training ship in 1945 and was decommissioned in 1958 before being scrapped in 1960.

Admiral Spiridov and Admiral Greig were converted into diesel-powered oil tankers during the 1920s and were renamed Grozneft and Azneft respectively. They were subsequently transferred to the Black Sea where the latter ship parted her moorings during a storm in Tuapse on 23 December 1938. She was blown onto a mole and capsized. Grozneft was renamed Groznyy in 1935 and was captured by the Germans on 8 October 1941. The ship was scuttled at Mariupol on 20 September 1943 and was refloated after the war. Groznyy was transferred back to the Baltic in 1946. Admiral Butakov was renamed Voroshilov in 1928, and multiple plans were drawn up for her to be completed, including some as a training ship armed with 4 B-2LM turrets (Project 78), but none of these came to fruition. Her hull was used as a breakwater at the mouth of the Neva River at Saint Petersburg before being broken up in 1952.
