= Borodino-class battlecruiser =

Imperial Russian Navy warship

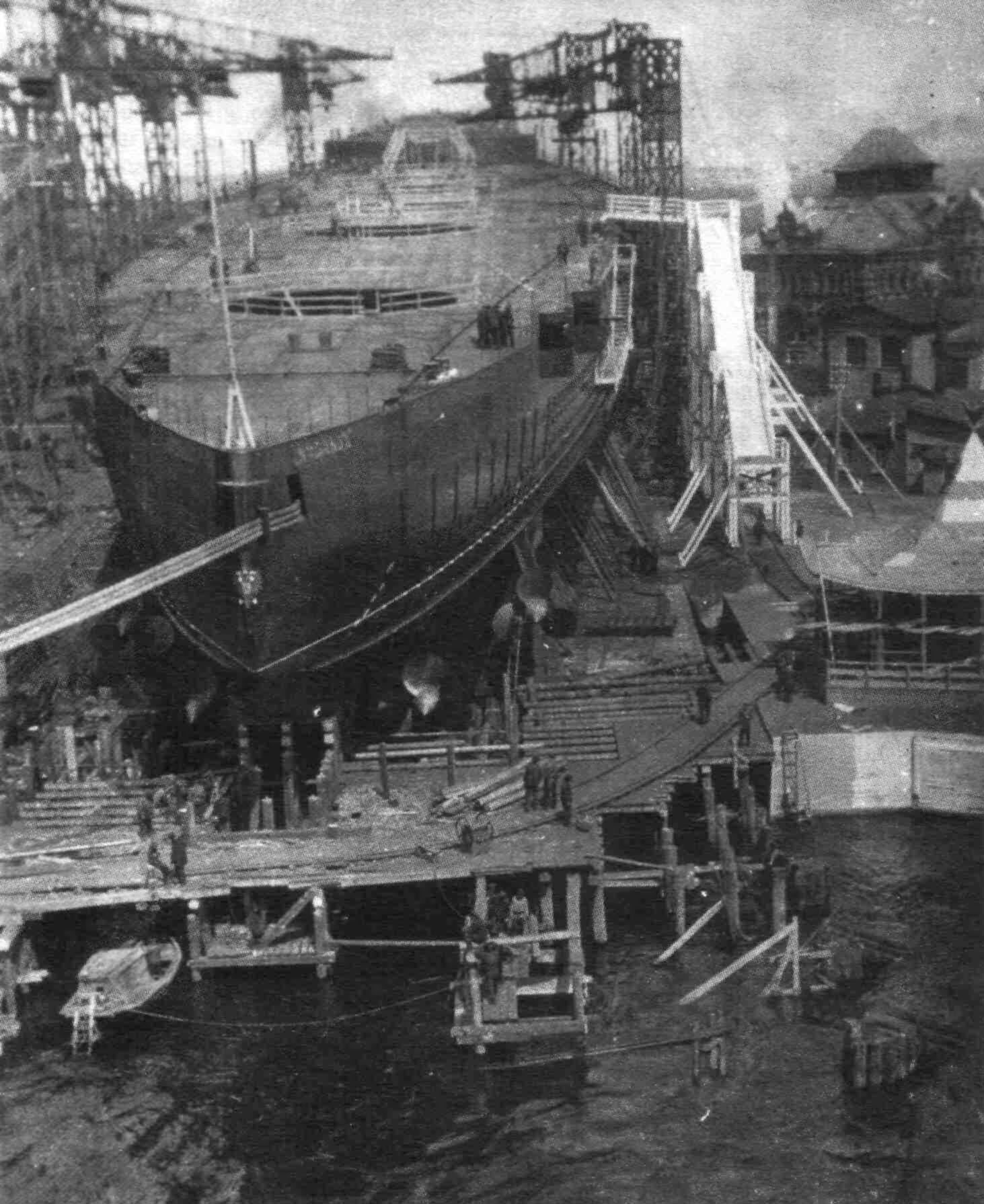
- Launch of Izmail in 1915

Class overview
- Name: Borodino (Izmail)
- Operators: Russian Navy
- Preceded by: None
- Succeeded by: Kronshtadt class
- Built: 1912–1917
- Planned: 4
- Canceled: 4

General characteristics
- Type: Battlecruiser
- Displacement: 32,500 long tons (33,022 t) (normal)
- Length: 223.85 m (734 ft 5 in)
- Beam: 30.5 m (100 ft 1 in)
- Draught: 8.81 m (28 ft 11 in)
- Installed power: 25 Yarrow boilers; 66,000 shp (49,000 kW)
- Propulsion: 4 shafts; 4 steam turbine sets
- Speed: 26.5 knots (49.1 km/h; 30.5 mph)
- Complement: 1,174
- Armament: 4 × triple 356 mm (14 in) guns; 24 × single 130 mm (5.1 in) guns; 4 × single 64 mm (2.5 in) AA guns; 6 × 450 mm (17.7 in) torpedo tubes
- Armour: Waterline belt: 125–237.5 mm (4.92–9.35 in); Barbettes: 147.5–247.5 mm (5.81–9.74 in); Conning tower: 250–400 mm (9.8–15.7 in); Turrets: 300 mm (11.8 in); Decks: 37.5–75 mm (1.48–2.95 in); Bulkheads: 75–300 mm (3.0–11.8 in)

The Borodino-class battlecruisers (Russian: Линейные крейсера типа «Измаил») were a group of four battlecruisers ordered by the Imperial Russian Navy before World War I. Also referred to as the Izmail class, they were laid down in late 1912 (Note: All dates used in this article are New Style (Gregorian).) at Saint Petersburg for service with the Baltic Fleet. Construction of the ships was delayed by a lack of capacity among domestic factories and the need to order some components from abroad. The start of World War I slowed their construction still further, as the imported components were often not delivered and domestic production was diverted into areas more immediately useful for the war effort.

Three of the four ships were launched in 1915 and the fourth in 1916. Work on the gun turrets lagged, and it became evident that Russian industry would not be able to complete the ships during the war. The Russian Revolution of 1917 halted all work on the ships, which was never resumed. Although some consideration was given to finishing the hulls that were nearest to completion, the three furthest from completion were sold for scrap by the Soviet Union during the early 1920s. In 1925, the Soviet Navy proposed to convert Izmail, the ship closest to completion, to an aircraft carrier, but the plan was cancelled after political manoeuvring by the Red Army cut funding and she was eventually scrapped in 1931.

== Design and development ==
After the end of the Russo-Japanese War of 1905, the Russian Naval General Staff decided that it needed a squadron of fast armoured cruisers (Note: The Borodino-class ships were formally classified as armoured cruisers until an order of 29 July 1915, when they were redesignated as battlecruisers (lineinyi kreiser).) that could use their speed to engage the leader of an enemy's battle line, as Admiral Tōgō had done against the Russian fleet during the Battle of Tsushima. The Naval General Staff initially called for a ship with high speed (28 knots (52 km/h; 32 mph)), 305-millimetre (12 in) guns, and limited protection (a waterline belt of 190 mm or 7.5 in). The Tsar, head of the Russian government, approved construction of four such ships on 5 May 1911, but the State Duma session ended before the proposal could be voted on. Preliminary bids for the ships were solicited from private builders, but the bids proved to be very high, leading to a reconsideration of the requirements. The Naval General Staff issued a new specification on 1 July 1911 for a ship with a speed of only 26.5 knots (49.1 km/h; 30.5 mph) and with armour increased to 254 mm (10 in). The armament was increased to nine 356-millimetre (14 in) guns in three non-superfiring triple-gun turrets, based on a false rumour that the Germans were increasing the calibre of the guns in their battleships. The Imperial Russian Navy believed that widely separating the main gun turrets and their magazines reduced the chance of a catastrophic ammunition explosion, reduced the silhouette of the ship and improved stability without superfiring turrets and their tall barbettes.

The Naval Ministry solicited new bids on 8 September from 23 shipbuilders, domestic and foreign, but only 7 responded, even after the deadline was extended by a month. Several designs were rejected for not meeting the revised criteria. In the meantime, the Artillery Section of the Main Administration of Shipbuilding had decided that it preferred a four-turret design, and new bids were solicited in May 1912 from the leading contenders from the first round of bidding. The eventual winner was a design by the Admiralty Shipyard in Saint Petersburg which had the extra turret added to a new hull section inserted into the original three-turret design.

The Duma approved construction in May 1912, before the design was finalised, and allocated 45.5 million roubles for each ship. The additional gun turret and consequent increase in the size of the ships led to the ships being overbudget by about 7 million roubles each, and some money was diverted from the budget for the Svetlana-class cruiser to cover the discrepancy. Orders were placed on 18 September 1912 for a pair of ships each from the Admiralty Shipyard and the Baltic Works, also of Saint Petersburg. The first pair was to be ready for trials on 14 July 1916, and the second pair on 14 September 1916.

Full-scale armour trials in 1913 revealed serious weaknesses in the Borodinos' proposed protection scheme. The obsolete ironclad Chesma had been modified with armour protection identical to that used by the Gangut-class battleships, then under construction. The deck and turret-roof armour proved to be too thin, and the structure supporting the side armour was not strong enough to withstand the shock of impact from heavy shells. The design of the Borodinos' armour was similar in construction to that of the Ganguts and therefore needed to be modified, which slowed construction. The Borodinos' deck armour was reinforced with extra plates and the thickness of the turret roofs was increased. To offset this additional weight, a planned rear conning tower was removed entirely and the thickness of the main belt was slightly reduced. Mortise and tenon joints were introduced between the armour plates along their vertical edges to better distribute the shock of a shell impact and to lessen the stress on the supporting hull structure. The launching of the first pair of ships was postponed by six months because of these changes, plus delays imposed by the many ship orders already in hand. (Note: The shipyards were overloaded with orders and lacked the capacity to maintain the original construction schedule.)

=== General characteristics ===
The Borodino-class ships were 223.85 metres (734 ft 5 in) long overall. They had a beam of 30.5 metres (100 ft 1 in) and a draught of 8.81 metres (28 ft 11 in) at full load. The ships displaced 32,500 long tons (33,000 t) normally and 36,646 long tons (37,234 t) at full load. High-tensile steel was used throughout the hull with mild steel used only in areas that did not contribute to structural strength. The hull was subdivided by 25 transverse watertight bulkheads and the engine room was divided by a longitudinal bulkhead. The double bottom had a height of 1.275 metres (4 ft 2 in), and the vitals of the ship were protected by a triple bottom that added an extra 875 millimetres (2 ft 10 in) of depth. The design called for a freeboard of 8.89 metres (29 ft 2 in) forward, 6.24 metres (20 ft 6 in) amidships and 6.49 metres (21 ft 4 in) aft. The ships were fitted with three Frahm anti-rolling tanks on each side.

=== Propulsion ===
The Borodinos were powered by four sets of steam turbines, each driving one propeller shaft using steam provided by 25 triangular Yarrow boilers with a working pressure of 17 kg/cm^{2} (1,667 kPa; 242 psi). The turbines developed a total of 66,000 shaft horsepower (49,000 kW) and were designed to be overloaded to 90,000 shp (67,000 kW). The forward boilers were grouped into three compartments with three oil-fired boilers in each compartment. The rear boilers were in four compartments with each containing four coal-fired boilers fitted with oil sprayers to increase the burn rate. Maximum speed was estimated at 26.5 knots, although forcing the machinery would increase it to 28.5 knots (52.8 km/h; 32.8 mph). The ships were designed to carry 1,974 long tons (2,006 t) of coal and 1,904 long tons (1,935 t) of fuel oil, which gave an estimated range of 2,280 nautical miles (4,220 km; 2,620 mi) at full speed.

Two sets of steam turbines were ordered on 22 April 1913 from the Franco-Russian Works in Saint Petersburg for the Admiralty Shipyard-built ships, and the Baltic Works built the turbines for its ships, although some components were ordered from abroad. However, Western sources have long stated incorrectly that the turbines for Navarin had been ordered from AG Vulcan, and that they were taken over at start of the war for use in the Brummer-class light cruisers. As well as being contradicted by original Russian and German records, this is technically impossible, as the turbines actually specified for Navarin were of the Parsons type, while those actually employed in the German cruisers were of the Curtis pattern. In fact, the Brummer class engines had been ordered for the lead ship of the Svetlana-class cruisers.

The Borodino class had six turbo generators and two diesel generators, each rated at 320 kilowatts (430 hp). These were in four compartments below the main deck, two each fore and aft of the boiler and engine rooms. The generators powered a complex electrical system that combined alternating current for most equipment with direct current for heavy-load machinery such as the turret motors.

=== Armament ===
The ships' primary armament consisted of a dozen 52-calibre 356-millimetre (14 in) Model 1913 guns mounted in four electrically powered turrets. The turrets were designed to elevate and traverse at a rate of 3° per second. The guns had an elevation range from −5° to +25°. They could be loaded at any angle between −5° and +15°; the expected rate of fire was three rounds per minute. Space was provided for a maximum of 80 rounds per gun. The guns fired 747.6-kilogram (1,648 lb) projectiles at a muzzle velocity of 731.5 m/s (2,400 ft/s), with a maximum range of 23,240 metres (25,420 yd).

The secondary armament consisted of twenty-four 55-calibre 130 mm (5.1 in) Pattern 1913 guns mounted in casemates in the hull, twelve per side. The guns had a maximum elevation of +20° which gave them a range of 15,364 metres (16,802 yd). They fired 36.86-kilogram (81.3 lb) projectiles at a muzzle velocity of 823 m/s (2,700 ft/s).

The anti-aircraft armament was intended to be four 38-calibre 64-millimetre (2.5 in) anti-aircraft guns fitted on the upper deck with 220 rounds carried for each gun. They fired 4.04-kilogram (8.9 lb) projectiles at a muzzle velocity of 686 m/s (2,250 ft/s). Four 75-millimetre (3.0 in) guns were to be mounted in pairs on the main turret roofs for sub-calibre training with the main guns. Six underwater 450-millimetre (17.7 in) torpedo tubes were fitted, three on each broadside; they were provided with a total of eighteen torpedoes.

=== Fire control ===
The fore and aft main gun turrets were given a 6-metre (19 ft 8 in) rangefinder, and there was another 5-metre (16 ft 5 in) unit on top of the conning tower. These would provide data for the Geisler central artillery post analogue computer, which would then transmit commands to the gun crew. The mechanical fire-control computer would have been either a Pollen Argo range clock, which had been bought in 1913, or a domestically designed Erikson system.

=== Protection ===
The trials with Chesma greatly affected the armour protection design of the Borodino-class ships. The Krupp cemented-armour plates were resized to match the frames and provide support for their joints; they were also locked together with mortise-and-tenon joints to better distribute the shock of a shell's impact. The 237.5-millimetre (9.4 in) waterline belt covered the middle 151.2 metres (496 ft 1 in) of the ship. It had a total height of 5.015 metres (16 ft 5 in), of which 3.375 metres (11 ft 1 in) was above the design waterline and 1.64 metres (5 ft 5 in) below. The remaining portion of the waterline was protected by 125-millimetre (4.9 in) plates. The upper belt was 100 millimetres (3.9 in) thick and had a height of 2.89 metres (9 ft 6 in). It thinned to 75 millimetres forward of the casemates and extended all the way to the bow. The rear portion of the forecastle deck was protected by an upward extension of the upper belt in the area of the forward barbettes and the upper casemates. Those casemates were protected by 100-millimetre transverse bulkheads. Behind the side armour was an inboard longitudinal splinter bulkhead that was 50 millimetres (2.0 in) thick between the middle and lower decks and decreased to 25 millimetres (0.98 in) between the middle and upper decks. The bulkhead sloped away from the edge of the lower deck to the lower edge of the armour belt with a total thickness of 75 millimetres divided between a 50-millimetre plate of Krupp non-cemented armour (KNC) layered above a 25-millimetre nickel-steel plate. The forward end of the armoured citadel was protected separately and the transverse bulkhead was therefore only 75 millimetres thick. The rear bulkhead had no other protection and was 300 millimetres (11.8 in) thick between the middle and lower decks, decreasing to 75 millimetres at the level of the armour belt.

The main gun turrets were designed with 300-millimetre sides and 150-millimetre roofs. The gun ports would have been protected by 50-millimetre plates with 25-millimetre bulkheads separating each gun inside the turrets. The barbettes were 247.5 millimetres (9.7 in) thick and decreased to 147.5 millimetres (5.8 in) when behind other armour. They were shaped like truncated cones which matched the trajectories of descending shells and thus lessened their protective value. The conning tower was 400 millimetres (15.7 in) thick and reduced to 300 millimetres below the upper deck. The funnel uptakes were protected by 50 millimetres of armour. The upper deck was 37.5 millimetres (1.5 in) thick and the middle deck consisted of 40-millimetre (1.6 in) plates of KNC on 25 millimetres of nickel-steel over the armoured citadel. The sides of the conning tower were fitted with armour plates 400 millimetres (15.7 in) thick and its roof was 250 millimetres (9.8 in) thick. Underwater protection was minimal: there was only a 10-millimetre (0.4 in) watertight bulkhead behind the upward extension of the double bottom, and this became thinner as the hull narrowed towards the end turrets.

== Construction ==
All four ships were officially laid down on 19 December 1912, and work began in March–April 1913. After a progress review on 4 June 1914, launching (Note: A ship's hull needs to be merely watertight and strong enough to hold together before it can be launched. Generally the major structural work is completed before launching, but the machinery and main armament may or may not be installed before the ship is launched.) of the first pair of ships was delayed until October. When World War I began in August, the hull of Izmail was judged as being 43 per cent complete, the others lagging considerably behind. The war caused further delays as some components had been ordered from foreign manufacturers. For example, the gun turrets were intended to rest on 203 mm (8 in) roller bearings made in Germany, but attempts to order replacements from the United Kingdom and Sweden proved futile, as no company was willing and able to make the bearings. The war caused other delays, including competition for scarce resources needed by other production deemed necessary for the war. Three of the four ships were launched in 1915, but it was clear that Russian industry would not be able to complete them during the war, mostly because the turrets were seriously delayed by non-delivery of foreign-built components and a shortage of steel. They were reclassified as second rank projects by the Main Administration of Shipbuilding in 1916 and construction virtually stopped.

Various plans were made by the Naval General Staff and the Main Administration of Shipbuilding for the post-war completion of the ships, including modifying the turrets to load at a fixed angle of +4° to reduce the weight and complexity of the loading equipment. Another intended change was to lengthen the funnels by 2 metres (6 ft 7 in) to minimise smoke interference with the bridge, which had been a problem on the Gangut-class dreadnoughts. There were suggestions to improve the machinery with geared turbines, turbo-electric drive, or Föttinger's hydraulic transmission, but these were more theoretical than practical.

After the February Revolution, the condition of the ships was assessed on 28 April 1917. The ship that was furthest along was still Izmail: her hull, engines, and boilers were around 65 per cent complete, and her armour was 36 per cent complete. Her turrets were not expected to be completed until 1919. The Congress of Shipyard Workers decided to continue work on the Izmail in mid-1917, but only to provide jobs. The Provisional Government halted all work on Borodino, Kinburn, and Navarin on 24 October 1917, and the Bolsheviks ordered work on Izmail halted on 14 December 1917.

After the end of the Russian Civil War was in sight by October 1921, the victorious Bolsheviks considered finishing Izmail, and possibly Borodino, to their original design. It would have taken at least two years to build all of Izmail's turrets, even if enough guns had been available. Ten had been delivered by Vickers before the Revolution and one gun had been completed domestically in 1912, but the prospects for more guns were not promising, given the poor state of Soviet heavy industry in the wake of the civil war. Another problem was their complicated electrical system; it could not be completed under current conditions, and at least twenty months would be required to replace it with a simpler system.

The Soviets also considered finishing Kinburn and Navarin to a modified design that featured 410-millimetre (16 in) guns; a two-gun turret weighed slightly less than a triple 354 mm (13.9 in) gun turret. The proposal was rejected because the prospects of actually acquiring such guns were minimal. Domestic industry was incapable of building such large guns and the Soviets were not able to purchase the guns from any foreign company. Other ideas were examined for the three less complete ships. These included converting the hulls to cargo ships, passenger liners, or 22,000-long-ton (22,000 t) oil barges, but the hulls were thought to be too large and unwieldy for the proposed uses. None of the proposals was accepted, and all three of the less complete ships were sold to a German company for scrap on 21 August 1923 to raise much-needed cash for the government.

In May 1925, the Operational Administration of the Soviet Navy contemplated converting Izmail into an aircraft carrier with a top speed of 27 knots (50 km/h; 31 mph) and a capacity of 50 aircraft. She would have been armed with eight 183-millimetre (7.2 in) guns and her armour reduced to a maximum of 76 millimetres (3.0 in). This proposal was approved by Alexey Rykov, Chairman of the Council of the People's Commissars on 6 July 1925, but the Red Army was strongly opposed to spending more money on naval projects. They managed to block the project by gaining control of a commission appointed to review the needs of the Navy in December, which cancelled the project on 16 March 1926. After most of her boilers were used during the reconstructions of the battleships Parizhskaya Kommuna and Oktyabrskaya Revolyutsiya, Izmail was scrapped beginning in 1931 in Leningrad.

== Ships ==
The ships were named after battles fought by the Russian Empire:

Construction data
Name	Namesake	Builder	Laid down	Launched	Fate	Status on 28 April 1917			
Name	Namesake	Builder	Laid down	Launched	Fate	Hull	Armour	Engines	Boilers
Izmail (Измаил)	Siege of Izmail	Baltic Works	19 December 1912	22 June 1915	scrapped, 1931	65%	36%	66%	66%
Borodino (Бородино)	Battle of Borodino	Admiralty Shipyard	19 December 1912	31 July 1915	sold for scrap, 21 August 1923	57%	13%	40%	38.4%
Kinburn (Кинбурн)	Battle of Kinburn	Baltic Works	19 December 1912	30 October 1915	sold for scrap, 21 August 1923	52%	5%	22%	7.2%
Navarin (Наварин)	Battle of Navarino	Admiralty Shipyard	19 December 1912	9 November 1916	sold for scrap, 21 August 1923	50%	2%	26.5%	12.5%

== Bibliography ==
- Breyer, Siegfried (1992). Soviet Warship Development. Vol. I: 1917–1937. London: Conway Maritime Press. ISBN 0-85177-604-3.
- Budzbon, Przemysław (1985). "Russia". In Gray, Randal (ed.). Conway's All the World's Fighting Ships 1906–1921. Annapolis, Maryland: Naval Institute Press. ISBN 0-85177-245-5.
- Dodson, Aidan & Nottelmann, Dirk (2021). The Kaiser's Cruisers 1871–1918. Barnsley/Annapolis: Seaforth Publishing/Naval Institute Press. ISBN 978-1-68247-745-8.
- Friedman, Norman (2008). Naval Firepower: Battleship Guns and Gunnery in the Dreadnought Era. Annapolis, Maryland: Naval Institute Press. ISBN 978-1-59114-555-4.
- Friedman, Norman (2011). Naval Weapons of World War One. Barnsley, UK: Seaforth. ISBN 978-1-84832-100-7.
- McLaughlin, Stephen (2003). Russian & Soviet Battleships. Annapolis, Maryland: Naval Institute Press. ISBN 1-55750-481-4.
- Silverstone, Paul H. (1984). Directory of the World's Capital Ships. New York: Hippocrene Books. ISBN 0-88254-979-0.
- Taras, Alexander (2000). Корабли Российского императорского флота 1892–1917 гг. [Ships of the Imperial Russian Navy 1892–1917]. Library of Military History (in Russian). Minsk: Kharvest. ISBN 985-433-888-6.
- Watts, Anthony (1990). The Imperial Russian Navy. London: Arms and Armour Press. ISBN 0-85368-912-1.
