= Nautilus-class minelayer =

Imperial German Navy's Nautilus-class of minelayer cruisers

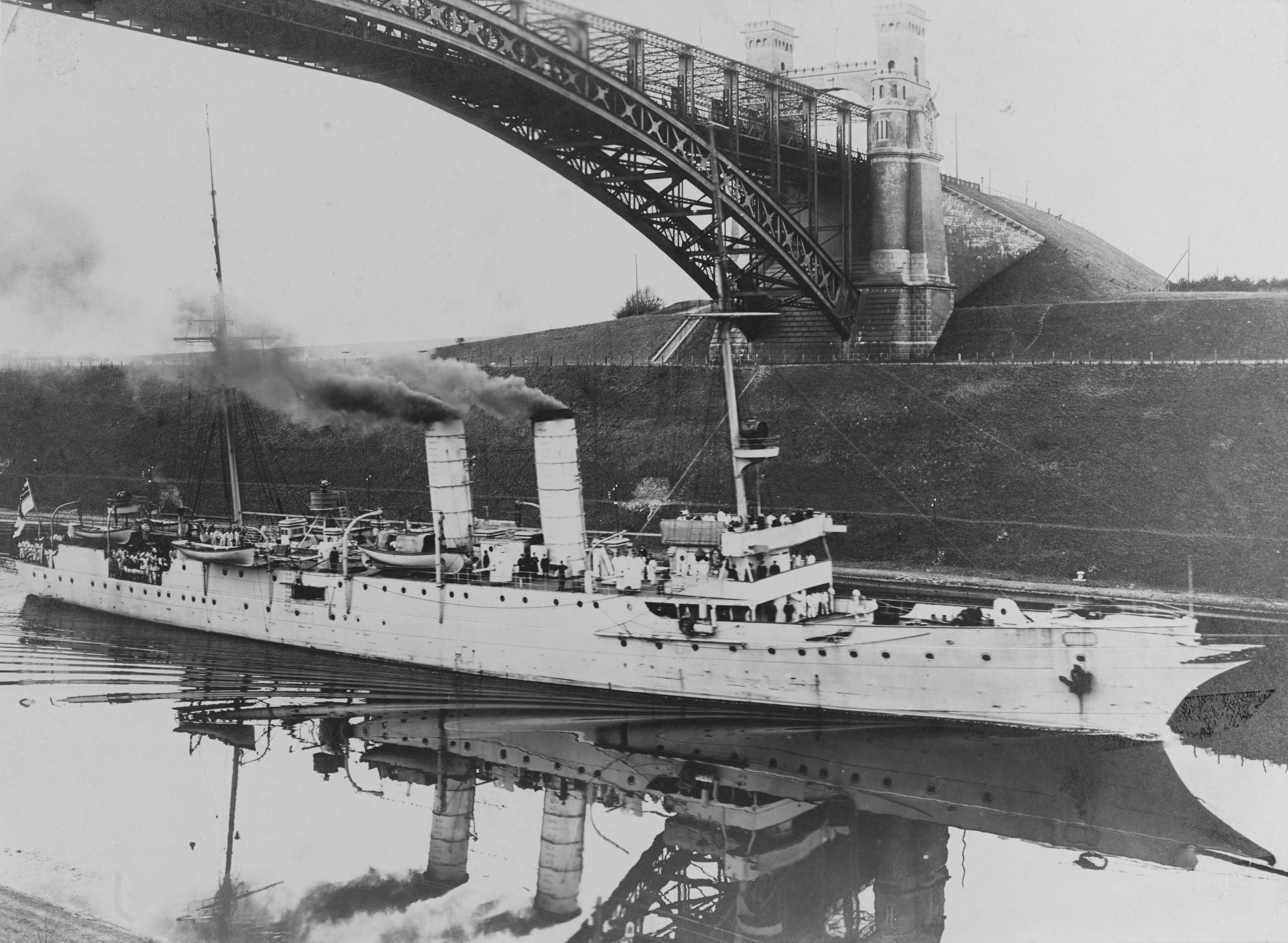
- Nautilus passing under the Levensau High Bridge in the Kaiser Wilhelm Canal shortly after entering service

Class overview
- Name: Nautilus class
- Builders: AG Weser, Bremen
- Operators: Imperial German Navy
- Preceded by: SMS Pelikan
- Succeeded by: Brummer class
- Built: 1905–1908
- In commission: 1907–1919
- Completed: 2
- Scrapped: 2

General characteristics
- Class & type: Nautilus-class minelayer
- Displacement: 2,345 t (2,308 long tons; 2,585 short tons)
- Length: 98.2 m (322 ft 2 in) o/a
- Beam: 11.2 m (36 ft 9 in)
- Draft: 4.42 m (14 ft 6 in)
- Installed power: 4 × water-tube boilers; 6,600 PS (6,510 ihp; 4,850 kW)
- Propulsion: 2 × screw propellers; 2 × triple expansion engines
- Speed: 20 knots (37 km/h; 23 mph)
- Range: 3,530 nautical miles (6,540 km; 4,060 mi) at 9 knots (17 km/h; 10 mph)
- Complement: 11 officers; 197 men
- Armament: 8 × 8.8 cm (3.5 in) SK L/35 guns; 288 mines

The Nautilus class was a pair of minelaying cruisers built by the Imperial German Navy. Nautilus was laid down in 1905 and completed by 1907, and SMS Albatross was laid down in 1907, and completed in 1908. Both ships were built by the AG Weser shipyard in Bremen, but to slightly different designs. Nautilus had a clipper bow, while Albatross had a bow similar to contemporary German light cruisers. The ships were armed with a battery of 8.8 cm (3.5 in) guns and had a capacity of 168–288 naval mines.

The two ships served with the High Seas Fleet after entering service, with only one in the fleet at a time, usually trading service with the fleet either for refits or mine warfare training. After the start of World War I, the ships laid several minefields, both to protect the German coast and also to interfere with British naval operations. In 1915, Albatross was transferred to the Baltic Sea to operate against the Russian Baltic Fleet, where she was eventually ambushed by Russian cruisers and forced to beach in the Battle of Åland Islands in July. Nautilus took part in Operation Albion in 1917 and was rearmed in 1918 to support amphibious operations, but she did not see action in that role.

Albatross was returned to Germany after the war ended in 1918, and both vessels were stricken from the naval register in 1919. Albatross, never repaired from the damage sustained in 1915, was sold for scrap immediately, but Nautilus was retained as a hulk until 1928, when she too was broken up.

== Design ==
=== General characteristics ===
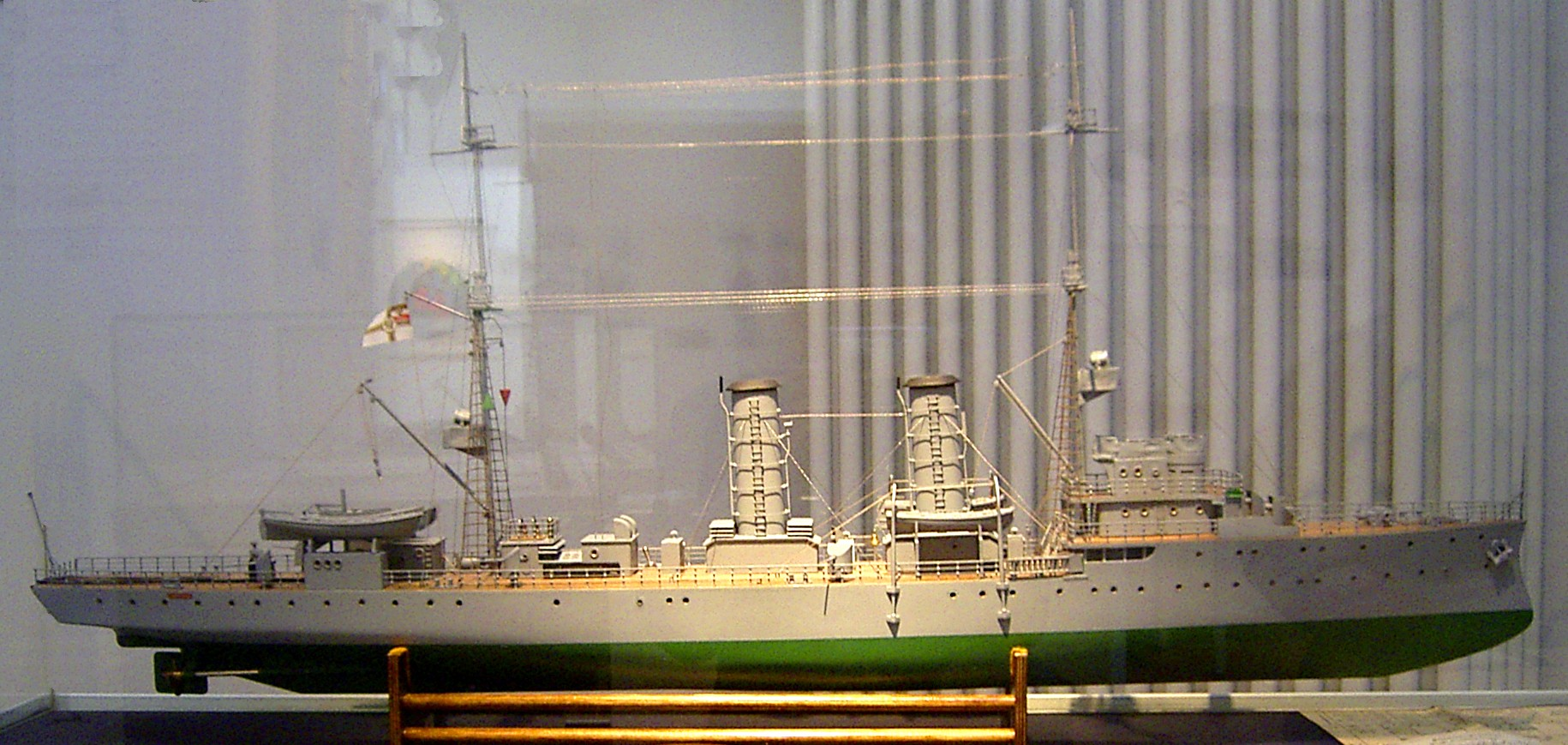
Model of Albatross; Nautilus had a clipper bow and a superstructure deck from the conning tower to the main mast

The two ships of the Nautilus class varied slightly in their dimensions. Nautilus was 98.20 meters (322 ft 2 in) long overall and had a beam of 11.20 m (36 ft 9 in) and an average draft of 4.42 m (14 ft 6 in) forward. Albatross was slightly larger, with an overall length of 100.90 m (331 ft), a beam of 11.50 m (37 ft 9 in) and a draft of 4.40 m (14 ft 5 in). Nautilus displaced 1,975 metric tons (1,944 long tons) normally and up to 2,345 t (2,308 long tons) at full load, while Albatross normally displaced 2,208 t (2,173 long tons) and 2,506 t (2,466 long tons) fully laden. In 1909–10, Nautilus was modernized at the Kaiserliche Werft (Imperial Shipyard) in Kiel. Her stern overhang was extended by 2.70 m (8 ft 10 in), bringing the ship's overall length to 100.90 m (331 ft), and her superstructure deck was extended further aft.

The ships' hulls were constructed from transverse and longitudinal steel frames, and were divided into nine watertight compartments, with a double bottom that extended for 60 percent of the length of the hull. Both vessels had two pole masts fitted with spotting tops. Nautilus and Albatross had different bows; Nautilus received a clipper bow, while Albatross had a ram bow like contemporary German light cruisers. Albatross also had a higher forecastle that extended to the base of the main mast, while Nautilus was completed with a superstructure deck that began just aft of the fore mast.

Steering was controlled with a single rudder. The vessels handled well and had a tight turning radius, but they suffered from weather helm and tended to drift while underway. The ships' crew numbered ten officers and 191 enlisted men, and later increased to eleven officers and 197 enlisted men. The ships carried several smaller boats, including two picket boats, one launch, two yawls, and one dinghy. These were handled with a large derrick that was fitted to the main mast.

=== Machinery ===
Their Propulsion system consisted of two 3-cylinder triple-expansion steam engines each driving a single four-bladed screw propeller that was 3.20 m (10 ft 6 in) in diameter. Steam for the engines was supplied by four coal-fired marine-type boilers that were divided into four individual boiler rooms; the boilers were trunked into two closely spaced funnels in pairs. Electricity was provided by two turbo generators that provided 90 kilowatts (120 hp) at 110 volts.

The ships' engines were rated to produce a top speed of 20 knots (37 km/h; 23 mph) from 6,600 indicated horsepower (4,900 kW), though both ships slightly exceeded those figures on speed trials, with Nautilus reaching 20.8 knots (38.5 km/h; 23.9 mph) and Albatross at 20.2 kn (37.4 km/h; 23.2 mph). The ships were designed to carry 200 t (200 long tons; 220 short tons) of coal, though by using auxiliary storage spaces, Nautilus could store up to 490 t (480 long tons; 540 short tons) and Albatross could carry up to 526 t (518 long tons; 580 short tons). This allowed the ships to cruise for 3,530 to 3,680 nautical miles (6,540 to 6,820 km; 4,060 to 4,230 mi) at a speed of 9 knots (17 km/h; 10 mph).

=== Armament ===
Albatross in port

The primary armament for the Nautilus class was a battery of eight 8.8 cm (3.5 in) SK L/35 guns in individual mounts. (Note: In Imperial German Navy gun nomenclature, "SK" (Schnelladekanone) denotes that the gun is quick loading, while the L/35 denotes the length of the gun. In this case, the L/35 gun is 35 calibers, meaning that the gun is 35 times long as it is in diameter.) Two were placed side by side on the forecastle, four were placed on the superstructure amidships, with two on each broadside, and the last two were mounted side by side at the stern. The guns were supplied with a total of 2,000 rounds of ammunition, and they had a maximum range of 9,100 m (29,855 ft 8 in). Nautilus initially carried 186 naval mines, though this was later increased to 205, while Albatross had a capacity of 288 mines. In 1918, Nautilus was rearmed with two 7.6 cm (3.0 in) guns, four 2 cm (0.79 in) anti-aircraft guns, twenty-four machine guns, two flamethrowers, and four mine-launchers, in addition to her normal capacity of mines. Her new armament was intended to allow the ship to support amphibious operations.

== Ships ==
Construction data
Name	Builder	Laid down	Launched	Completed
Nautilus	AG Weser, Bremen	1905	28 August 1906	19 March 1907
Albatross	AG Weser, Bremen	1907	23 October 1907	19 May 1908

== Service history ==
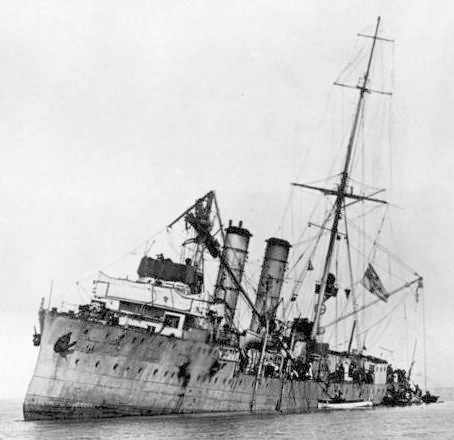
Albatross beached after the Battle of Åland Islands

After entering service, Nautilus and Albatross alternated between service with the High Seas Fleet; Nautilus participated in the annual fleet maneuvers in 1907 and 1908, and was replaced by Albatross thereafter. Nautilus was modernized at the Kaiserliche Werft (Imperial Shipyard) in Kiel in 1909–1910, and Albatross underwent a similar modernization there in 1910–1911. While Albatross was out of service, Nautilus temporarily returned to the fleet. Once the former's refit was completed in 1911, the latter was transferred to mine warfare training in the North Sea before being decommissioned at the end of the year. Albatross remained in service through 1914, but apart from a collision with the steamer SS Wartburg, the time passed uneventfully.

After the outbreak of World War I in July 1914, both ships were mobilized to lay a series of minefields, initially to protect Germany's coastlines in the North and Baltic Seas. In August, the two ships laid offensive minefields off the British coast, and Nautilus made a similar attempt in October that was cancelled when radio intercepts indicated British naval forces were present. In June 1915, Albatross was transferred to the eastern Baltic, where she began to lay offensive minefields. The last of these resulted in the Battle of Åland Islands on 2 July after a group of Russian armored cruisers intercepted Albatross and her escorts. The cruisers badly damaged Albatross, and to prevent her sinking, her captain beached the ship off the coast of neutral Sweden.

Nautilus was transferred to the Baltic in 1916, and took part in Operation Albion in 1917, where she supported the conquest of the Gulf of Riga. In 1918, she was modified to support amphibious operations, with her 8.8 cm guns replaced by a host of smaller weapons. She was assigned to the Sonderverband (Special Unit) tasked with supporting the White Finns during the Finnish Civil War, though she did not see action. Instead, she spent the remainder of the war patrolling in the eastern Baltic. After the war ended in November 1918, Nautilus was demilitarized according to the terms of the Treaty of Versailles and hulked; she was renamed Hulk I and later Hulk A, eventually being scrapped in 1928. Albatross, meanwhile, had been refloated by a Swedish salvage company in July 1915 and interned for the rest of the war. She was returned in 1919, stricken from the naval register and scrapped that year.
