= SMS Albatross (1907) =

German Navy's Nautilus-class minelayer

- Albatross in port

History

German Empire
- Name: Albatross
- Builder: AG Weser, Bremen
- Laid down: 24 May 1907
- Launched: 23 October 1907
- Commissioned: 19 May 1908
- Stricken: 21 March 1921
- Fate: Broken up, 1921

General characteristics
- Class & type: Nautilus-class minelayer
- Displacement: 2,506 t (2,466 long tons; 2,762 short tons)
- Length: 100.9 m (331 ft 0 in) o/a
- Beam: 11.5 m (37 ft 9 in)
- Draft: 4.4 m (14 ft 5 in)
- Installed power: 4 × water-tube boilers; 6,600 PS (6,510 ihp; 4,850 kW)
- Propulsion: 2 × screw propellers; 2 × triple expansion engines
- Speed: 20 knots (37 km/h; 23 mph)
- Range: 3,530 nautical miles (6,540 km; 4,060 mi) at 9 knots (17 km/h; 10 mph)
- Complement: 11 officers; 197 men
- Armament: 8 × 8.8 cm (3.5 in) SK L/35 guns; 288 mines

SMS Albatross (Note: "SMS" stands for "Seiner Majestät Schiff", or "His Majesty's Ship" in German.) was a German minelaying cruiser built for the Kaiserliche Marine (Imperial Navy), the second and final member of the Nautilus class. Her keel was laid down in May 1907 at the AG Weser shipyard; she was launched in October and commissioned into the fleet in May 1908. Her armament consisted of eight 8.8 cm (3.5 in) guns and 288 naval mines.

Her peacetime career consisted of conducting fleet training exercises and serving as a mine warfare training ship. After the outbreak of World War I in July 1914, Albatross laid several offensive and defensive minefields in the North Sea. She was assigned to the Baltic Sea in 1915, and began a series of operations to block Russian naval operations in the eastern Baltic. These culminated in the Battle of Åland Islands on 2 July, where a group of Russian armored cruisers surprised Albatross and the light cruiser Augsburg after they had laid a minefield off the Åland Islands. Albatross was badly damaged in the battle and forced to beach off the island of Gotland in neutral Sweden. The ship was refloated by the Swedes later that month and interned for the remainder of the war, along with her crew. She was returned to Germany in January 1919, was sold for scrap, and broken up in Hamburg.

== Design ==
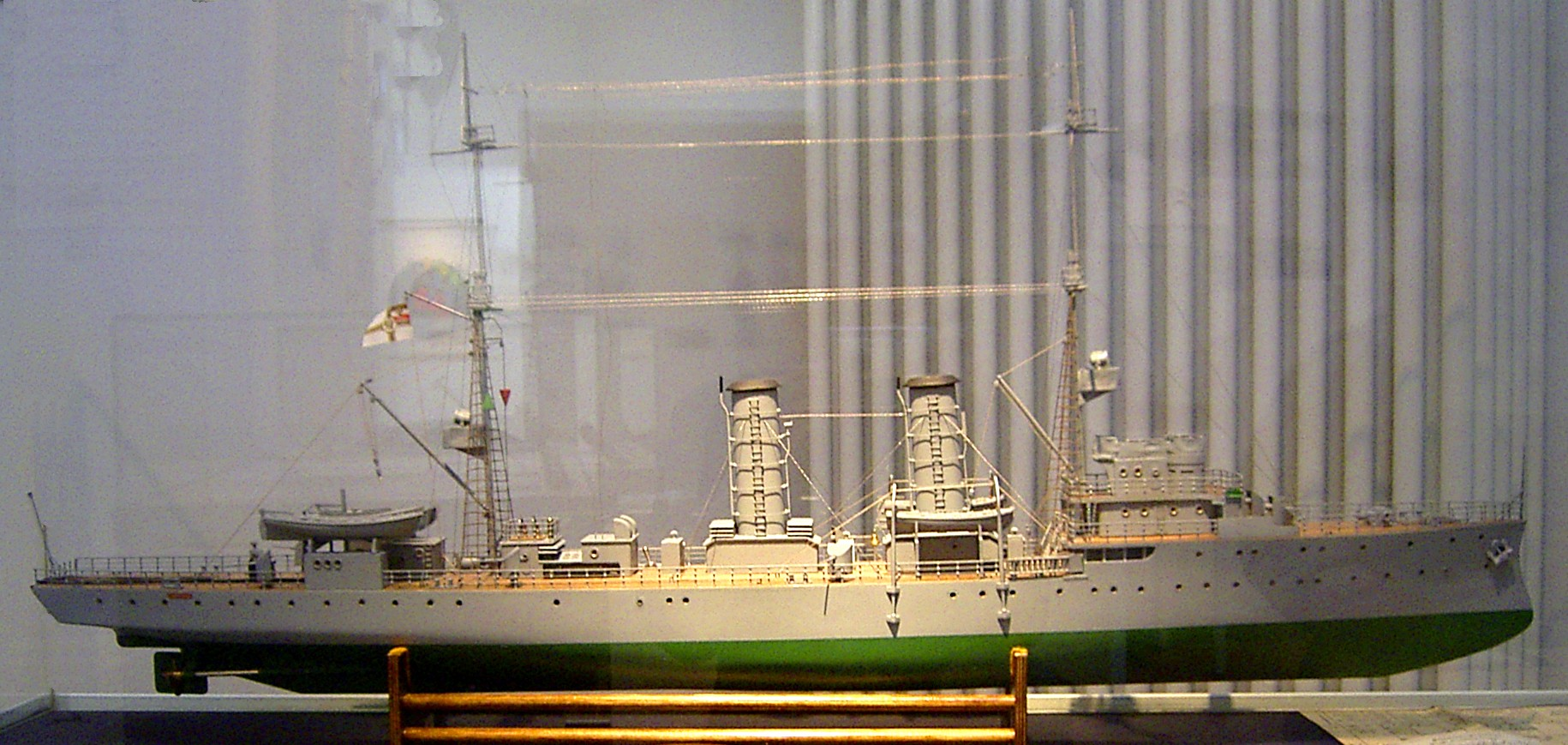
Model at Deutsches Marinemuseum, Wilhelmshaven

Albatross was 100.9 meters (331 ft) long overall and had a beam of 11.5 m (38 ft) and an average draft of 4.4 m (14 ft) forward. She displaced 2,208 metric tons (2,173 long tons; 2,434 short tons) normally and up to 2,506 t (2,466 long tons; 2,762 short tons) at full load. Her crew numbered 10 officers and 191 enlisted men.

Her propulsion system consisted of two triple-expansion steam engines each driving a single screw propeller, with steam supplied by four coal-fired marine-type boilers. The ship's engines were rated to produce a top speed of 20 knots (37 km/h; 23 mph) from 6,600 PS (6,510 ihp; 4,850 kW), though Albatross slightly exceeded those figures on speed trials. She had a cruising radius of 3,530 nautical miles (6,540 km; 4,060 mi) at a speed of 9 knots (17 km/h; 10 mph).

The primary armament for Albatross was a battery of eight 8.8 cm (3.5 in) SK L/35 guns in individual mounts. Two were placed side by side on the forecastle, four were placed on the superstructure amidships, with two on each broadside, and the last two were mounted side by side at the stern. (Note: In Imperial German Navy gun nomenclature, "SK" (Schnelladekanone) denotes that the gun is quick loading, while the L/35 denotes the length of the gun. In this case, the L/35 gun is 35 calibers, meaning that the gun is 35 times long as its diameter.) She carried 288 naval mines.

== Service history ==
Albatross was built by the AG Weser shipyard in Bremen; her keel was laid down as "mine steamer B" on 24 May 1907, and her completed hull was launched as Albatross just five months later on 23 October. After completing fitting-out work, the ship was commissioned for sea trials on 19 May 1908, which lasted until 25 July. She spent the rest of the year in the minesweeping unit while the older minelayer Pelikan was undergoing a major overhaul. Albatross took part in the annual fleet maneuvers in August and September. On 26 October, she became a mine warfare training ship, and she was based in Cuxhaven. The following year followed a similar pattern.

In 1910, Albatross went into drydock at the Kaiserliche Werft (Imperial Shipyard) in Kiel for modernization that included moving the mine-launching equipment to the upper deck. The work lasted into 1911. After she returned to service, Albatross resumed her duties with the mine training school. In 1911, she accidentally rammed the DDG Hansa steamer Wartburg damaging her hull and necessitating repairs that took three weeks to complete. From late August to the end of September, Albatross operated in the Baltic Sea. For Albatross, 1912, 1913, and the first half of 1914 passed uneventfully, in the same routine as her first three years in service.

=== World War I ===
After the outbreak of World War I in July 1914, Albatross was classified as a mine cruiser. She was temporarily sent to the Baltic Sea to lay defensive minefields against a possible attack by the Russian Baltic Fleet. In late August, Albatross and her sister ship Nautilus were sent to lay a minefield off the Humber and the River Tyne. The two minelayers proceeded independently, and were each covered by a light cruiser and half-flotilla of destroyers. Albatross's group, which included the cruiser Stuttgart, departed from Helgoland early on the morning of 25 August. After arriving, Albatross laid a single mine field that was 11 nmi (20 km; 13 mi) long, though she had laid the field to the northwest of the intended location, owing to heavy fog. On the way back to port, the German vessels sank six British fishing vessels.

In June 1915, Albatross was transferred to the Baltic, along with the auxiliary minelayer Deutschland. Konteradmiral (Rear Admiral) Albert Hopman intended to lay a series of offensive minefields to prevent the Baltic Fleet from sortieing to attack German ports. Albatross conducted her first minelaying operation, codenamed V, on 20 June. Escorted by the armored cruisers Roon, Prinz Heinrich, and Prinz Adalbert and the light cruisers Augsburg and Lübeck, Albatross laid a minefield off the island of Bogskär. The operation was completed and the ships returned to Neufahrwasser on 22 June. Three days later, Albatross, laden with 350 mines, sortied with Prinz Adalbert, Prinz Heinrich, and the light cruiser Thetis to lay another minefield in operation VI. The four ships were screened by eight torpedo boats from X Flotilla. The ships completed the operation and returned to Neufahrwasser at 23:00 on 26 June.

==== Battle of Åland Islands ====
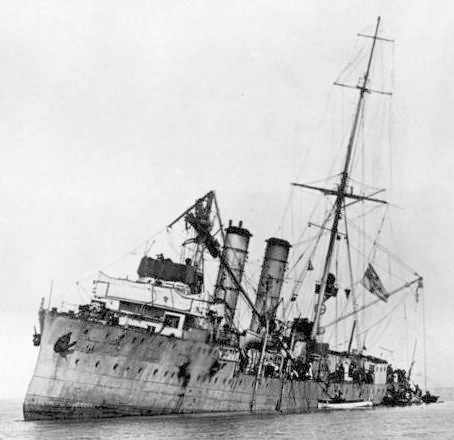
Albatross beached after the battle

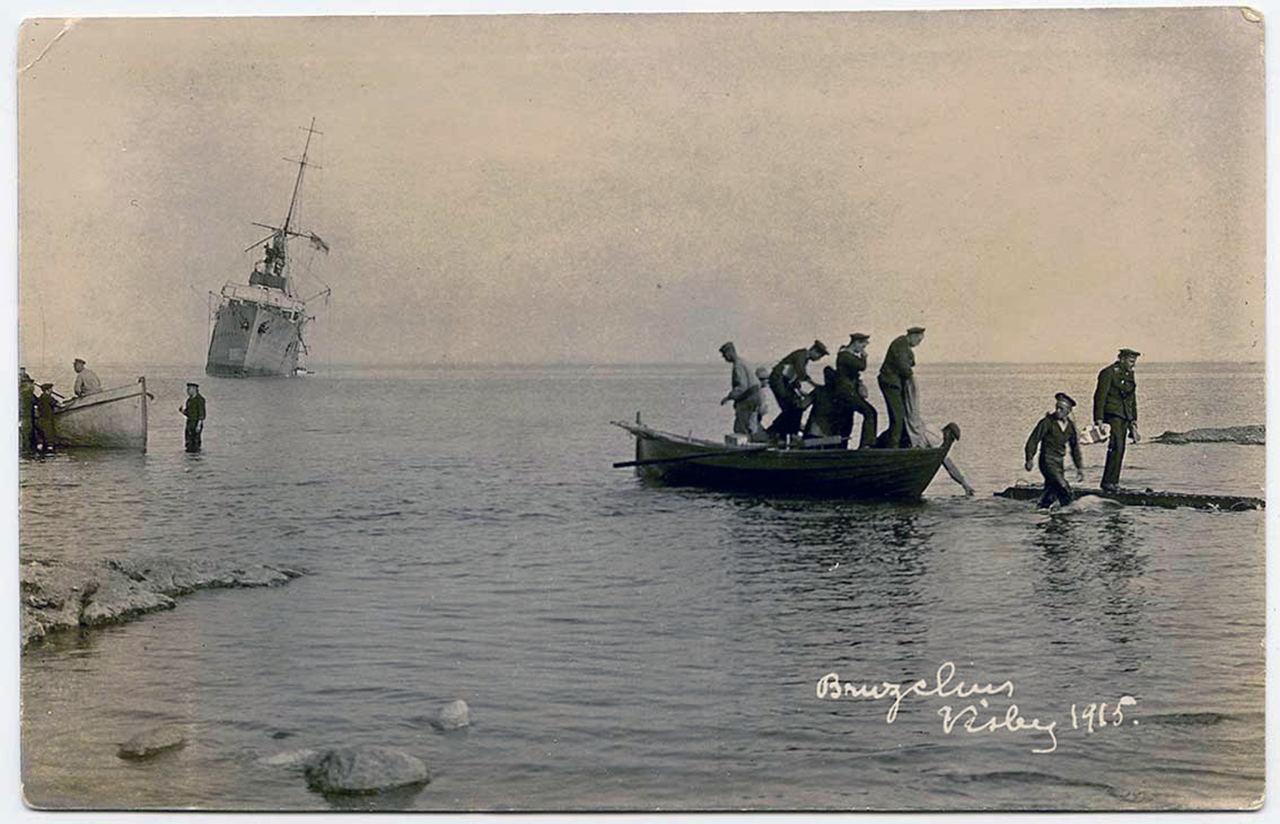
Survivors of Albatross

The next operation, VII, began on the night of 30 June, when Albatross, Roon, and five torpedo boats steamed out of the Vistula River; they were met the following morning by Augsburg—the flagship of Kommodore (Commodore) Johannes von Karpf—Lübeck, and two more torpedo boats. Albatross was to lay another minefield off Bogskär. Later that day, Roon, Lübeck, and two torpedo boats separated from the rest of the flotilla to guard a channel between German minefields, while Albatross and the rest of the ships continued north to Bogskär. That evening, Albatross laid a field of 160 mines, after which she and Augsburg turned back south and rendezvoused with Roon and Lübeck. Karpf then issued via Wireless a report to headquarters that gave his position, speed, and bearing. This message was intercepted and decrypted by the Russians; coincidentally, the Russian fleet had planned an operation to bombard Memel the following day, and several cruisers had put to sea on 1 July.

Four Russian armored cruisers, with the powerful armored cruiser Rurik steaming in support, attempted to ambush the German squadron after receiving word of the intercepted message. Karpf dispersed his force shortly before encountering the Russians; Albatross, Augsburg, and three torpedo boats steamed to Rixhöft while the remainder went to Libau. Shortly after 06:30 on 2 July, lookouts on Augsburg spotted the Russian force; Karpf ordered the slower Albatross to seek refuge in neutral Swedish waters, while Augsburg and the torpedo boats used their high speed to escape the Russians and attempting to recall Roon and Lübeck. The Russian cruisers turned to port to bring their batteries to bear, and opened fire at a range of 8,000 m (26,000 ft); the cruisers Bogatyr and Oleg engaged Albatross. Heavy fog masked the Russian ships to the German gunners, preventing them from being able to return effective fire.

Karpf ordered the slow Albatross to make for neutral Swedish waters, where theoretically she would be protected from the Russian attack, while he tried to escape with Augsburg to the south. Soon, all four Russian cruisers were firing at Albatross, allowing Augsburg and the torpedo boats to escape freely. At 07:20, Albatross was hit for the first time. As the range closed, the Russian ships came close enough that Albatross could reply with her 8.8 guns, but by this time the Russian fire was beginning to take its toll. The forecastle was riddled with holes, the foremast was knocked down, and the conning tower was destroyed, killing the men inside. At 07:45, Albatross entered Swedish territorial waters, but the Russians continued firing for another twenty minutes, checking their fire only at 08:07 after the ship had reached Östergarn Sound. By this time, the ship was badly damaged and was listing heavily to port. Fearing that the ship would capsize, her captain ordered her to be beached.

In the course of the battle, Augsburg had been hit by six 8-inch (200 mm) and twenty 6-inch (150 mm) shells. One officer and 26 enlisted men were killed. In return, the ship scored a single hit on Bayan, with the shell splinters damaging a 7.5 cm (3.0 in) gun and wounding one man. Hopman considered sending a torpedo boat to try to pull Albatross free, but the threat of Russian vessels in the area led him to abandon the idea. Instead, he sortied with Prinz Adalbert and Prinz Heinrich, intending to reinforce Karpf's ships and then to rescue Albatross. While he was en route, the British submarine HMS E9 torpedoed Prinz Adalbert, badly damaging her and forcing Hopman to break off the operation. Unable to free herself and with no rescue operation forthcoming, Albatross was interned by Sweden for the remainder of the war.

Of the fatalities, 26 of the German sailors were buried the same evening the battle was fought in a mass grave just east of Östergarn Church. One member of the crew had fallen overboard and could not be found. Two of the crew members who died during transportation to Roma were buried at Björke cemetery. The surviving German crew were interned, first in Roma, then at Blåhäll in Tofta. The Swedish salvage company Neptun refloated Albatross on 23 July and towed her to Fårösund before proceeding to Oskarshamn, where she was interned for the duration of the war. Sweden returned Albatross and her crew to Kiel in January 1919; there, she was formally decommissioned on 23 January. On 21 March, she was stricken from the naval register and thereafter sold for 900,000 marks and broken up for scrap in Hamburg.
