= SMS Nautilus (1906) =

Imperial German Navy's Nautilus-class minelayer cruiser

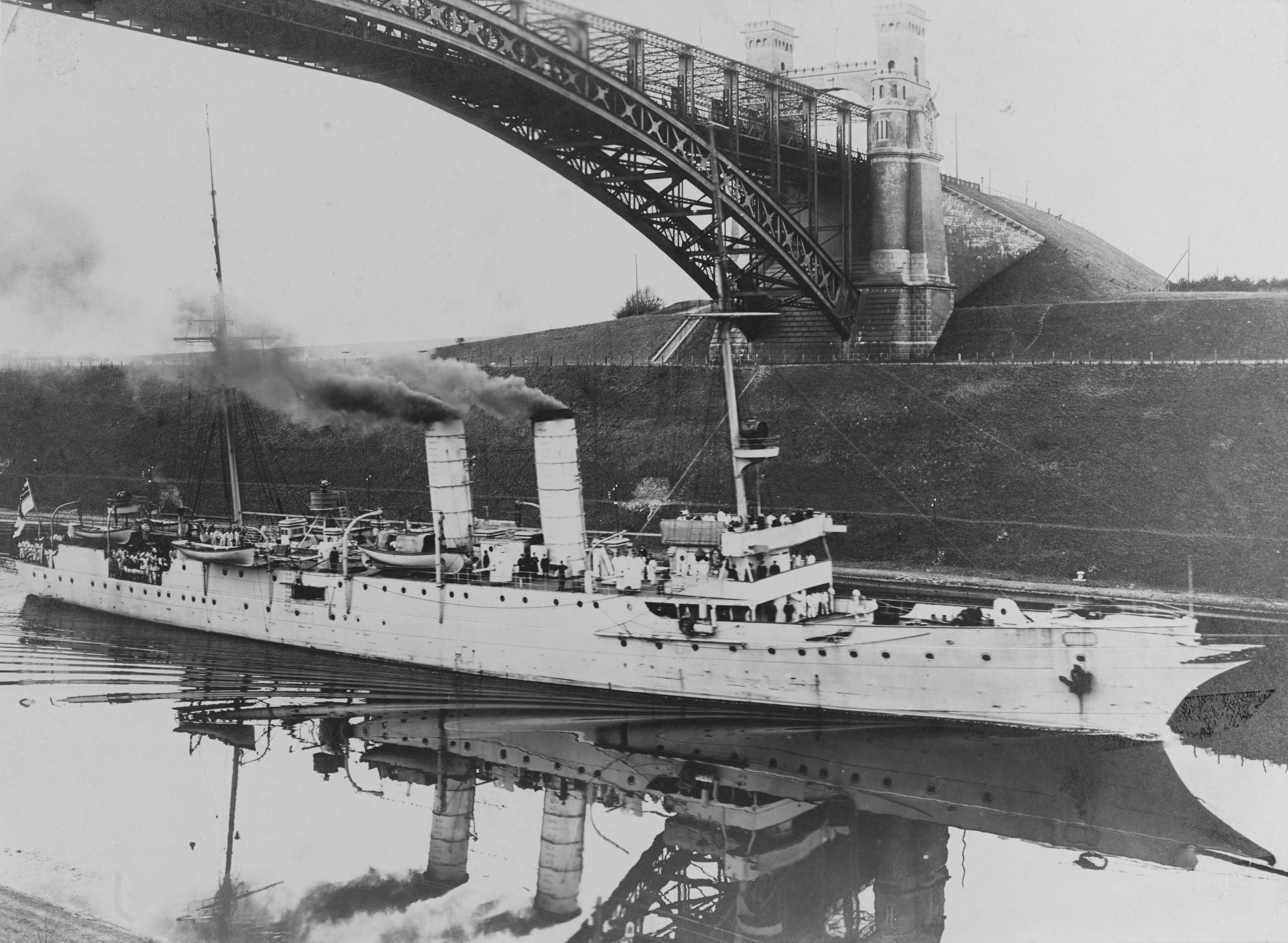
- Nautilus passing under the Levensau High Bridge in the Kaiser Wilhelm Canal shortly after entering service

History

German Empire
- Name: Nautilus
- Builder: AG Weser, Bremen
- Laid down: 19 December 1905
- Launched: 28 August 1906
- Commissioned: 19 March 1907
- Decommissioned: 10 December 1918
- Stricken: 21 March 1919
- Fate: Broken up 1928

General characteristics
- Class & type: Nautilus-class minelayer
- Displacement: 2,345 t (2,308 long tons; 2,585 short tons)
- Length: 98.2 m (322 ft 2 in) o/a
- Beam: 11.2 m (36 ft 9 in)
- Draft: 4.42 m (14 ft 6 in)
- Installed power: 4 × water-tube boilers; 6,600 PS (6,510 ihp; 4,850 kW)
- Propulsion: 2 × screw propellers; 2 × triple expansion engines
- Speed: 20 knots (37 km/h; 23 mph)
- Range: 3,530 nautical miles (6,540 km; 4,060 mi) at 9 knots (17 km/h; 10 mph)
- Complement: 11 officers; 197 men
- Armament: 8 × 8.8 cm (3.5 in) SK L/35 guns; 288 mines

SMS Nautilus (Note: "SMS" stands for "Seiner Majestät Schiff", or "His Majesty's Ship" in German.) was a German minelaying cruiser built for the Kaiserliche Marine (Imperial Navy) in the 1900s, the lead ship of the Nautilus class. The ship was built by AG Weser, with her keel laying taking place in December 1905. She was launched in August 1906 and commissioned in March 1907. Nautilus initially carried 186 naval mines and a battery of eight 8.8 cm (3.5 in) guns, but she was later modified to carry 205 mines and, in 1918, numerous light weapons to support amphibious operations.

Nautilus spent her peacetime career conducting training exercises with the main fleet and minesweeping experiments before being placed in reserve in 1911. Reactivated at the start of World War I, she initially laid both defensive and offensive mine fields in the North and Baltic Seas. She was permanently transferred to the Baltic in 1916, and the following year she supported Operation Albion, the conquest of the Gulf of Riga. After Germany's defeat, Nautilus was demilitarized and used as a hulk from 1921 to 1928 before being sold for scrap and broken up in Copenhagen.

== Design ==
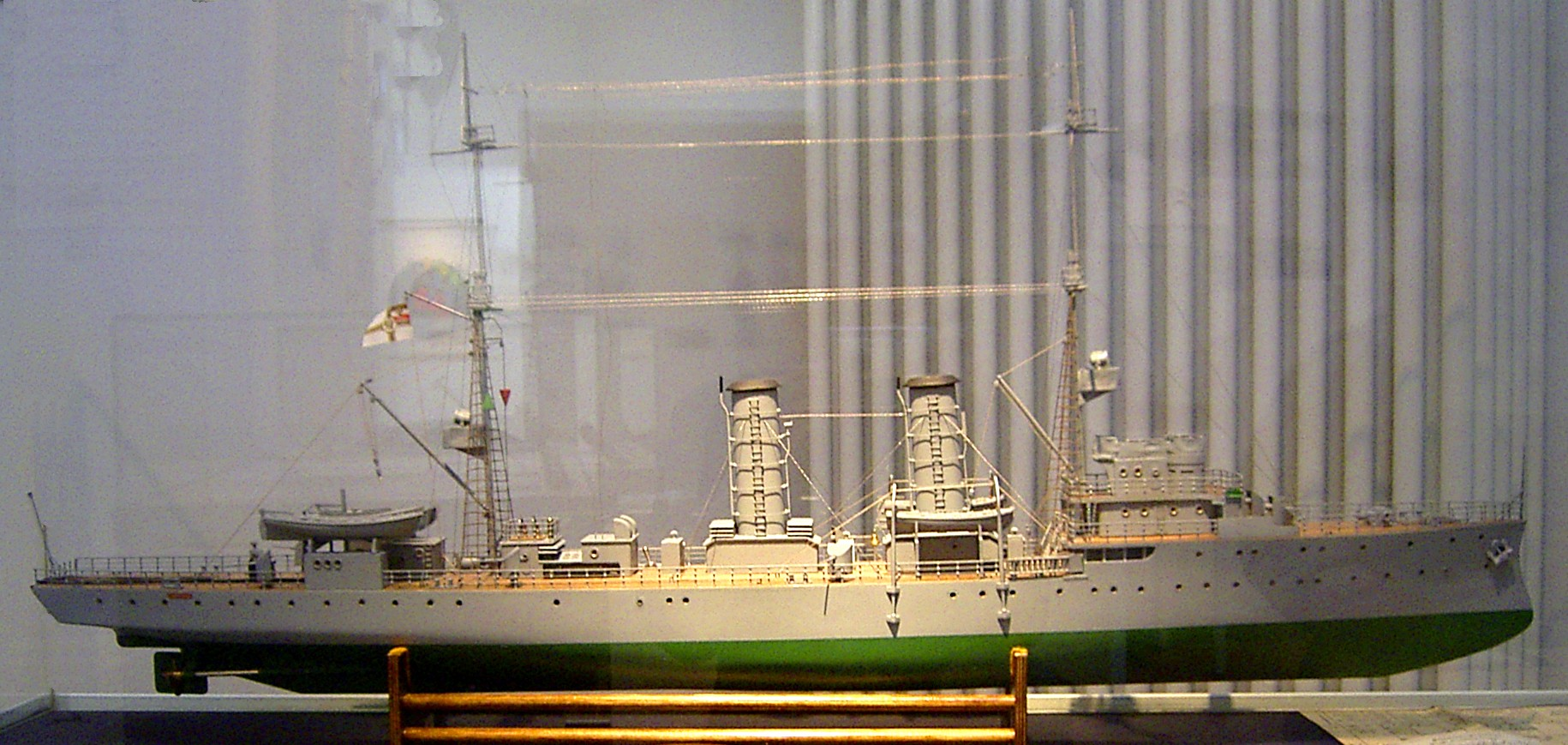
Model of Albatross; Nautilus had a clipper bow and a superstructure deck from the conning tower to the main mast

Nautilus was 98.2 meters (322 ft) long overall and had a beam of 11.2 m (37 ft) and an average draft of 4.42 m (14.5 ft) forward. She displaced 1,975 metric tons (1,944 long tons; 2,177 short tons) normally and up to 2,345 t (2,308 long tons; 2,585 short tons) at full load. Her crew numbered ten officers and 191 enlisted men.

Her propulsion system consisted of two triple-expansion steam engines each driving a single screw propeller, with steam supplied by four coal-fired marine-type boilers. The ship's engines were rated to produce a top speed of 20 knots (37 km/h; 23 mph) from 6,600 PS (6,510 ihp; 4,850 kW), though Nautilus slightly exceeded those figures on speed trials. She had a cruising radius of 3,530 nautical miles (6,540 km; 4,060 mi) at a speed of 9 knots (17 km/h; 10 mph).

The primary armament for Nautilus was a battery of eight 8.8 cm (3.5 in) SK L/35 guns in individual mounts. Six were placed on the superstructure amidships, with three on each broadside, and the last two were mounted side by side at the stern. (Note: In Imperial German Navy gun nomenclature, "SK" (Schnelladekanone) denotes that the gun is quick loading, while the L/45 denotes the length of the gun. In this case, the L/35 gun is 35 calibers, meaning that the gun is 35 times long as it is in diameter.) She initially carried 186 naval mines, though her storage capacity was later increased to 205.

== Service history ==
Nautilus was built by the AG Weser shipyard in Bremen; her keel was laid down as "mine steamer A" on 19 December 1905, and her completed hull was launched as Nautilus on 28 August 1906. After completing fitting-out work, the ship was commissioned for sea trials on 19 March 1907, which lasted until 25 May. She was initially used for mine warfare training and was based in Cuxhaven. Nautilus took part in the annual fleet maneuvers in August and September 1907 and 1908 before being decommissioned in Kiel; her role in the peacetime fleet was then taken over by her recently commissioned sister ship Albatross. In 1909–10, Nautilus was modernized at the Kaiserliche Werft (Imperial Shipyard) in Kiel. Her stern overhang was extended by 2.7 m (8 ft 10 in), bringing the ship's overall length to 100.9 m (331 ft), and her superstructure deck was extended further aft. The work was completed by January 1910.

On 23 January, Nautilus returned to her previous role with the fleet, and she took part in the annual fleet maneuvers that year. At the end of the year, she went to Kiel for an overhaul; the work lasted from 27 December to 27 January 1911. On 4 April, she returned to Kiel, her role in the fleet again being taken by Albatross. Nautilus spent the rest of the year conducting experiments with minesweepers in the North Sea. These were interrupted only by the annual fleet exercises. On 30 October, she was again decommissioned in Kiel, having been replaced by the light cruiser Arcona for the minesweeping experiments. She remained in reserve for over a year and a half, until she was reactivated on 5 June 1914 to replace the minelayer Pelikan, which was at the time going through a major overhaul.

=== World War I ===
After the outbreak of World War I in July 1914, Nautilus was classified as a coastal defense mine cruiser. She was temporarily sent to the Baltic Sea to lay defensive minefields against a possible attack by the Russian Baltic Fleet. In late August, Nautilus and Albatross were sent to lay a minefield off the Humber and the River Tyne. The two minelayers proceeded independently, and were each covered by a light cruiser and half-flotilla of destroyers. Nautilus's group, which included the cruiser Mainz, departed from Helgoland early on the morning of 25 August. After arriving, Nautilus laid a pair of mine fields that were both 5 nmi (9.3 km; 5.8 mi) long. On the way back to port, the German vessels sank six British fishing vessels. Nautilus, Albatross, and the auxiliary minelayer Kaiser laid a defensive minefield in the western German Bight on 9–10 September. On 14 October 1914, Nautilus and the light cruiser Kolberg steamed into the North Sea to lay a minefield off the Firth of Forth, but upon realizing British forces were operating off the Dogger Bank, they broke off the operation and returned to port.

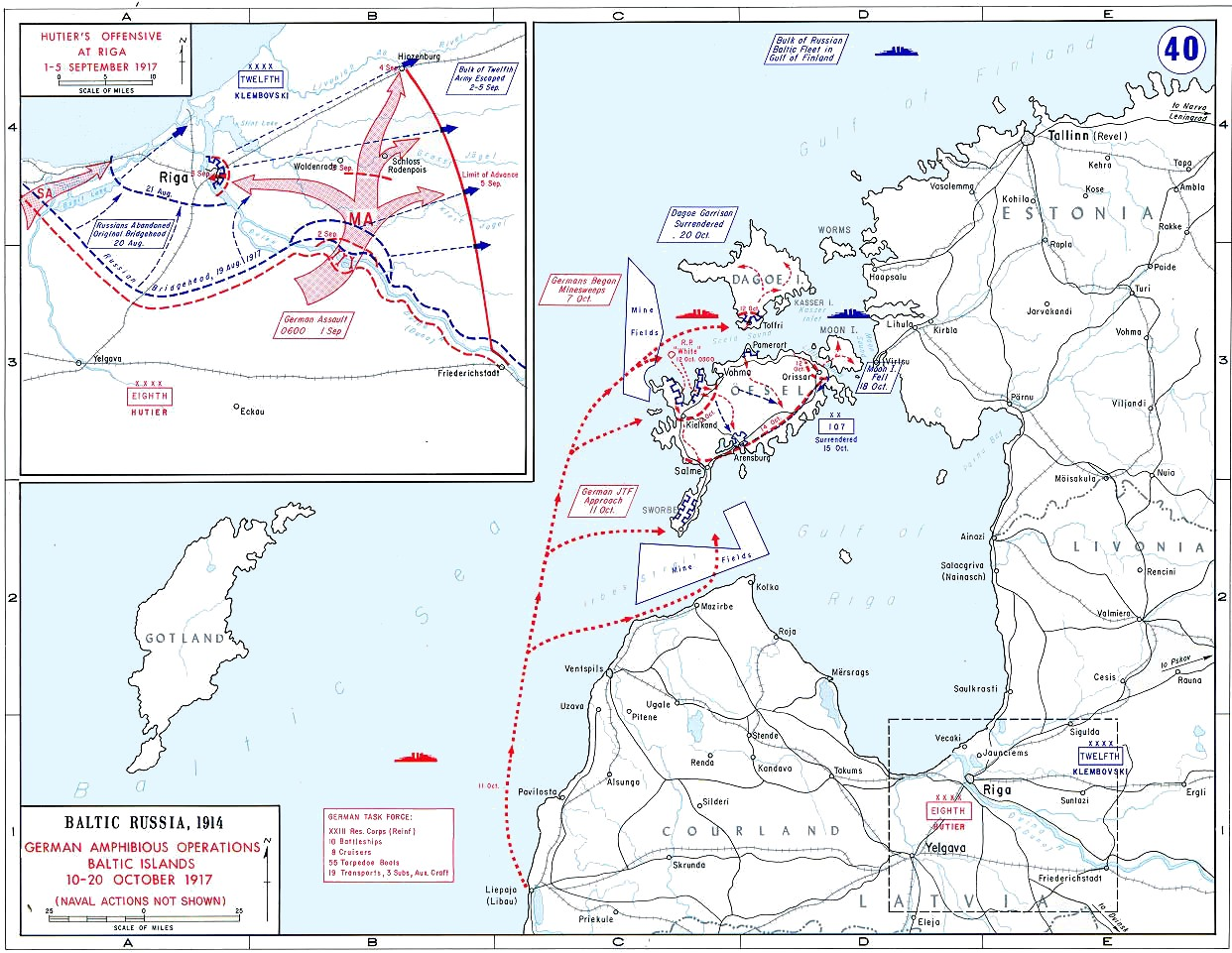
Map of German movements during Operation Albion

In April 1916, Nautilus was transferred to the Baltic after the newer, faster minelaying cruiser Brummer entered service. By 1917, the ship was assigned to the VI Scouting Group, along with the light cruisers Kolberg, Strassburg, and Augsburg, and the old aviso Blitz. Nautilus was assigned to the task force that launched Operation Albion in October 1917; she remained outside the Gulf of Riga until after the German squadron had cleared Russian forces from the area. She arrived in Arensburg on 18 October to improve the defenses of the port. On the 21st, Nautilus was to have laid mines in a channel to the west of Schildau, but the depth of the water was too shallow. Instead, Nautilus transferred her mines to some vessels from the II Minesweeper Flotilla, after which she returned to Arensburg.

In 1918, the ship's armament was revised significantly to allow the ship to support amphibious operations. Her armament now consisted of two 7.6 cm (3.0 in) guns, four 2 cm (0.79 in) anti-aircraft guns, twenty-four machine guns, two flamethrowers, and four mine-launchers, in addition to her normal capacity of mines. In February that year, she was assigned to the Sonderverband (Special Unit) tasked with supporting the anti-communist faction fighting in Finland's civil war. On 30 April, Konteradmiral (Rear Admiral) Ludolf von Uslar took command of the Sonderverband, and he chose Nautilus as his flagship. Following the disbanding of the unit the next month, Nautilus remained in the northern Baltic, patrolling off Åland, until she was decommissioned on 10 December.

Following the end of the war in late 1918, Germany was forced to sign the Treaty of Versailles, which significantly reduced Germany's naval strength. The new Reichsmarine was limited to six old pre-dreadnought battleships, six light cruisers, twelve destroyers, and twelve torpedo boats. All other vessels, to include Nautilus, were to either be sold for scrap or demilitarized. (Note: Treaty of Versailles Section II: Naval Clauses, Article 181.) As a result, the ship was stricken from the naval register on 21 March 1919 in Kiel. From 1921, she was used as a storage hulk in Bremen, before being renamed Hulk I on 1 January 1923. She was renamed again, as Hulk A on 1 April 1928 and moved to Bremerhaven, where she was assigned to the Training Inspectorate. She remained there for just four months, before being sold for 180,000 marks and broken up in Copenhagen.
