= 2013–14 Vojvodina League East =

Vojvodina League East
- Season: 2013–14
- Matches: 232
- Goals: 732 (3.16 per match)

== Teams ==
A total of 16 teams will contest the league. At the end of the season, the last four teams will be relegated.

Stadiums and locations
| Team | City | Stadium | Capacity |
|---|---|---|---|
| Vršac | Vršac | Stadion Ljubiša Popov | 5,000 |
| Borac | Starčevo | Stadion Borca | 3,000 |
| Crvena Zvezda | Rusko Selo | Stadion FK Crvena Zvezda | 1,000 |
| Budućnost | Srpska Crnja | Stadion u Crnji | 2,000 |
| Vršac United | Vršac | Stadion Ljubiša Popov | 5,000 |
| TSC | Bačka Topola | Gradski Stadion | 8,000 |
| OFK Kikinda | Kikinda | City Stadium Kikinda | 7,500 |
| Sloboda | Novi Kozarci | Stadion Novi Kozarci | 1,800 |
| Kozara | Banatsko Veliko Selo | Stadion Kozara | 2,000 |
| Radnički | Kovin | Stadion Radnički | 1,000 |
| Jedinstvo | Banatsko Karađorđevo | Stadion Jedinstvo | 3,000 |
| Bačka | Pačir | Pačir Stadion | 1,000 |
| Tisa | Adorjan | Stadion Tisa | 2,000 |
| Proleter | Banatski Karlovac | Stadion Banatski Karlovac | 1,000 |
| Borac | Sakule | Borac Stadion | 1,000 |
| Bilećanin | Sečanj | Stadion Sečanj | 2,000 |

== League table ==
| Pos | Team | Pld | W | D | L | GF | GA | GD | Pts | Promotion or relegation |
|---|---|---|---|---|---|---|---|---|---|---|
| 1 | Vršac (C, P) | 30 | 18 | 8 | 4 | 57 | 24 | +33 | 62 | Promotion to Serbian League Vojvodina |
| 2 | TSC | 30 | 17 | 4 | 9 | 53 | 29 | +24 | 55 | Promotion to Serbian League Vojvodina |
| 3 | Vršac United | 30 | 16 | 4 | 10 | 50 | 36 | +14 | 52 | Qualification for promotion play-offs |
| 4 | Borac Starčevo | 30 | 14 | 6 | 10 | 61 | 34 | +27 | 48 | |
| 5 | Crvena Zvezda Rusko Selo | 30 | 13 | 8 | 9 | 60 | 50 | +10 | 47 | |
| 6 | Tisa Adorjan | 30 | 13 | 1 | 16 | 66 | 64 | +2 | 39 | |
| 7 | Radnički Kovin | 30 | 12 | 3 | 15 | 44 | 42 | +2 | 39 | |
| 8 | Sloboda Novi Kozarci | 30 | 10 | 9 | 11 | 32 | 41 | −9 | 39 | |
| 9 | Kozara Banatsko Veliko Selo | 30 | 11 | 6 | 13 | 39 | 49 | −10 | 39 | |
| 10 | Jedinstvo Banatsko Karađorđevo | 30 | 12 | 3 | 15 | 45 | 68 | −23 | 39 | |
| 11 | Borac Sakule | 30 | 11 | 5 | 14 | 41 | 45 | −4 | 38 | |
| 12 | Budućnost Srpska Crnja | 30 | 10 | 7 | 13 | 39 | 44 | −5 | 37 | |
| 13 | Bačka Pačir | 30 | 11 | 4 | 15 | 49 | 56 | −7 | 37 | |
| 14 | Proleter Banatski Karlovac | 30 | 10 | 6 | 14 | 42 | 56 | −14 | 36 | |
| 15 | OFK Kikinda | 30 | 10 | 6 | 14 | 38 | 54 | −16 | 36 | |
| 16 | Bilećanin (R) | 30 | 10 | 4 | 16 | 46 | 70 | −24 | 34 | Relegation to District League |

Source: srbijasport.net
Rules for classification: 1) points; 2) goal difference; 3) number of goals scored.
(C) Champions; (P) Promoted; (R) Relegated
