= French people in Hungary =

Ethnic group

French Hungarians Français Hongrois Magyarországi franciák
Total population
- 2,210 (0.02% of the population)

Regions with significant populations
- Hungary
- Budapest: 6,189
- Békés County: 5,137
- Pest County: 4,000
- Hajdú-Bihar County: 2,000
- Csongrád County: 1,500^{[1]}
- Heves County: 500
- Jász-Nagykun-Szolnok County: 500

Languages
- French · Hungarian

Related ethnic groups
- French people

Historically, there was a significant French community residing in Hungary, who firstly came during the 11–13th century and then, once more, in a separate wave of settlement starting in the 18th century. Their descendants are today self-reported Hungarians in national censuses, with several of them having French surnames. The vast majority of today's French people living in Hungary have arrived since the Fall of the Iron Curtain.

== History ==
Several prominent noble families of Hungary originate from France or from Wallonia (e.g. Baron L'Huillier-Coburg, Baron Maillot de la Treille, Baron Toussainet, Baron Thierry, Baron Mandat-Grancey, Baron Deschan, Baron Montluisant, Baron Piret de Bihain, Baron Ransonnet, Earl Souches, Earl Sermage etc.).

=== Middle Ages ===
The first French settlers came to Hungary immediately after the foundation of the Kingdom of Hungary. Among the settled foreigners, Germans were overwhelming in the majority, however, according to researches of Mihály Auner among others proofs that the immigration of the French element besides the German played also a significant role in the life of Hungarians. In the official documents during the rule of the Árpáds the true meaning of the often occurring words latinus and olasz meant not the Italian people, but all peoples speaking Neo Latin languages (Italian, French, Romanian etc.). (In Hungarian today the word olasz means Italian. At that time the word talján or Lombardus was in use for people of the Italian peninsula.) Latini in the Middle Ages was the common name of mainly members of the Western Congregation, while Graeci stood for the Eastern Church proponents. According to historians the name of Hungarian settlements containing the word olasz or olaszi could meant Walloon or French, because in German they are translated as wallen.

The French/Walloons settled especially in Upper Hungary (in Eger, in Spiš and in Tokaj-Hegyalja) and Transylvania (in Kolozsvár, in Szatmár and in Várad-Olaszi (part of Nagyvárad)). The oldest among them was their settlement in Eger, which was already established likely in 1046. Several linguists (e.g. Géza Bárczi, János Melich and others) have assumed the Walloon-French origin of many of Hungarian place names, which can only be explained by the fact that they were founded by the French (e.g. Tállya from taille). According to János Melich it can be proofed with documents that between 1042 and 1048 Walloon and French settlers came to Hungary.

In Transdanubia, the town of Esztergom had a large number of French people living there. French names can be found among the members of the City Council until the 18th century. Esztergom was located along important commercial routes, and this lucky circumstance has made the town a center of commercial life in the Árpád era. Foreign merchants met here and changed their goods, many of them settled in the city. Master Roger called the French of Esztergom Francigenae.

Settlements established by French/Walloon settlers in the Middle Ages
Hungarian name	Latin name	German name	Established
Aldorf (part of Beszterce)	Superior Latina, in monte Gallorum	Wallendorf	ca. 1150
Andornaktálya	Talha Minor	?	11th century
Bodrogolaszi	Francavilla	?	13th century
Lapincsolaszi	?	Wallendorf	?
Nagyolaszi	Francavilla	?	
Nagyolaszi	Villa Advenarum Francorum	?	12th century
Nagytálya	Talha Major	?	?
Olasz	?	Ahlass	12th century
Olaszfalu	?	Wallendorf	1182
Olaszliszka	?	?	1239
Váradolaszi (part of Nagyvárad)	?	?	?
Volldorf (Dombos)	Villa Latina	Wallendorf	?
Tállya	?	?	?

Fruška Gora (transl. French Mountain) (today in Serbia) was also named after French settlers. The names mentioned in medieval documents Gallus, Gallicus, Francus also refer to French origin.

Beside the merchants and peasants from France and Walloonia priests, monks, missionaries and church dignitaries came to Hungary in large numbers many of whom brought their compatriots to their ecclesiastical headquarters (e.g. Leodvin, Bishop of Várad (r. c. 1050 – c. 1060) in Nagyvárad; Bonipert, Bishop of Pécs (r. 1009–1036) and Bartholomew le Gros, Bishop of Pécs (r. 1219–1251) in Pécs; Robert, Archbishop of Esztergom (r. 1226–1239) in Esztergom; Raynald of Belleville, Bishop of Transylvania in Gyulafehérvár). The first monks of the Cistercian Monasteries of Egres, Zirc, Pásztó, Szentgotthárd and Pilis Mountains were also French. These were built during the reign of Béla III who was known to have maintained good relations with the French and invited French craftsmen to Hungary to rebuild his royal palace and the cathedral in Esztergom. In 1091, King Saint Ladislaus founded the Somogyvár Abbey in Somogyvár whose monks could only be French until 1204.

The influence of medieval French settlements is also evident in the linguistic history of the Hungarian language. In spelling for the Hungarian cs (/tʃ/) sound the letters ch, for the ny (/ɲ/) sound the letters nh and for the sz (/s/) sound before i and e the letters sc came into use. Also several Hungarian words are of Walloon-French origin according to studies of Géza Bárczy.

The medieval French settlers with time assimilated into the Hungarian, Flandrenses and German (mainly Zipser German and Transylvanian Saxon) population. The supposition that Walloons of Nagyvárad used the French language still in the 14th century is made probable by the fact that they had French priest, Jean sacerdos de Olazi in 1330. According to Miklós Oláh the Walloons of Eger spoke French in 1536.

=== Banat French ===
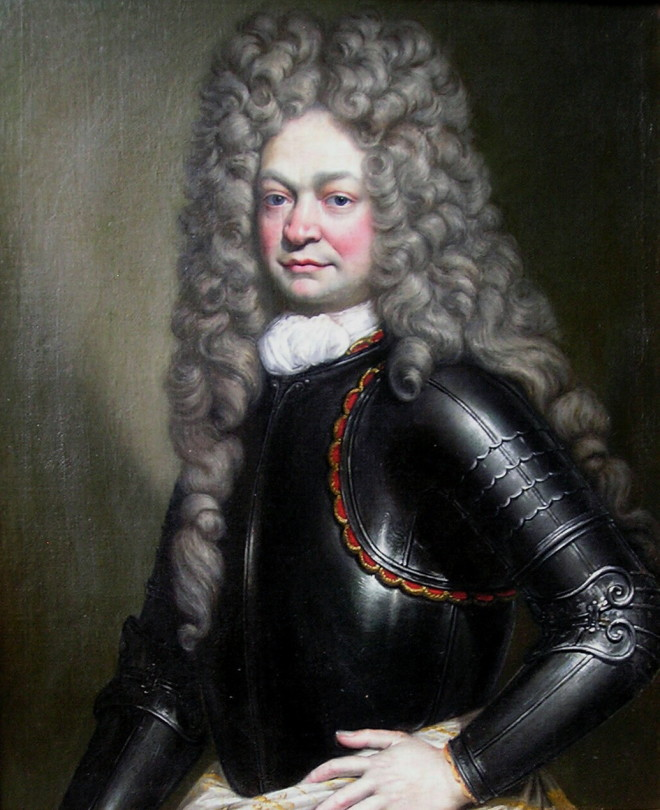
Count Claudius Florimund de Mercy (1666–1734), Imperial field marshal who coordinated the immigration of French settlers

During the Great Turkish War the Holy League could not liberate the whole territory of medieval Hungary from the Ottoman rule. The Treaty of Karlowitz (1699) ended the war in which the two parties agreed to accept the new borders between the Habsburg Empire and the Ottoman Empire which meant that the historical region of Banat stayed under Turkish rule. This agreement stayed in force until the Treaty of Passarowitz (1718) ending the Austro-Turkish War (1716–1718) in which Prince Eugene of Savoy and his army recaptured the Banat.

The Banat was in terrible condition at that time: the once densely populated area was almost completely uninhabited. Its residents died during the wars or escaped from the Ottoman oppression. The former Christian territory lost its buildings and churches, several of them were rebuilt to mosques. During the Ottoman rule huge areas of land became unproductive because it was not cultivated.

Count Claude Florimond de Mercy field marshal trusted of reviving this region. He founded new villages and invited settlers from different Christian territories (e.g. Germany, Italy, France, Spain etc.). Most of the settlers were Banat Swabians.

The first known French settled in the region was a postman named Miklós Noël in Lugos in 1724.

The first wave of French immigrants came from Lorraine and settled in Neu-Beschenowa in the summer of 1748. At that time the danger of an Ottoman attack was possible, so Maria Theresa order them to complete a military training to be able to fight in case of a war. French settlers can be found among the first residents of the newly established St Andreas in 1750. They all came from Lorraine one part speaking French and the other German.

French started to immigrate in larger numbers after 1763. According to László Marjanucz the earlier immigrants came mainly from Lorraine, Alsace, Luxembourg (Belgium) and Luxembourg, then later from regions of Metz, Besançon and Paris. Mercydorf was founded in 1735 and named after Count Claudius Florimund de Mercy. Its first residents were only Italians – 21 family in 1756. It was the only Italian dominated settlement of the Banat. During the years from 1769 to 1771 French settled in the village and they became the majority.

Between 1770 and 1771 the immigration reached its highest peak. The villages of Saint-Hubert, Charleville and Seultour were completely inhabited by French peasants from the Duchy of Lorraine. But the villages of Klein-Jetscha, Segenthau, Hatzfeld, Trübswetter, Gottlob, Ostern, Mercydorf, Charlottenburg, Rekasch, Marienfeld, Nakodorf and Weißkirchen had a significant French population. French settled also in Reschitz, Bruckenau, Jarmatha, Mastort, Heufeld, Groß-Jetscha, Tschatad, Bogarosch, Grabatz, Billed and Neu-Arad. Several settlers were referred to as Germans in official documents who had French surnames (e.g. Moutard, Duc, Boivinais, Pitance etc.).

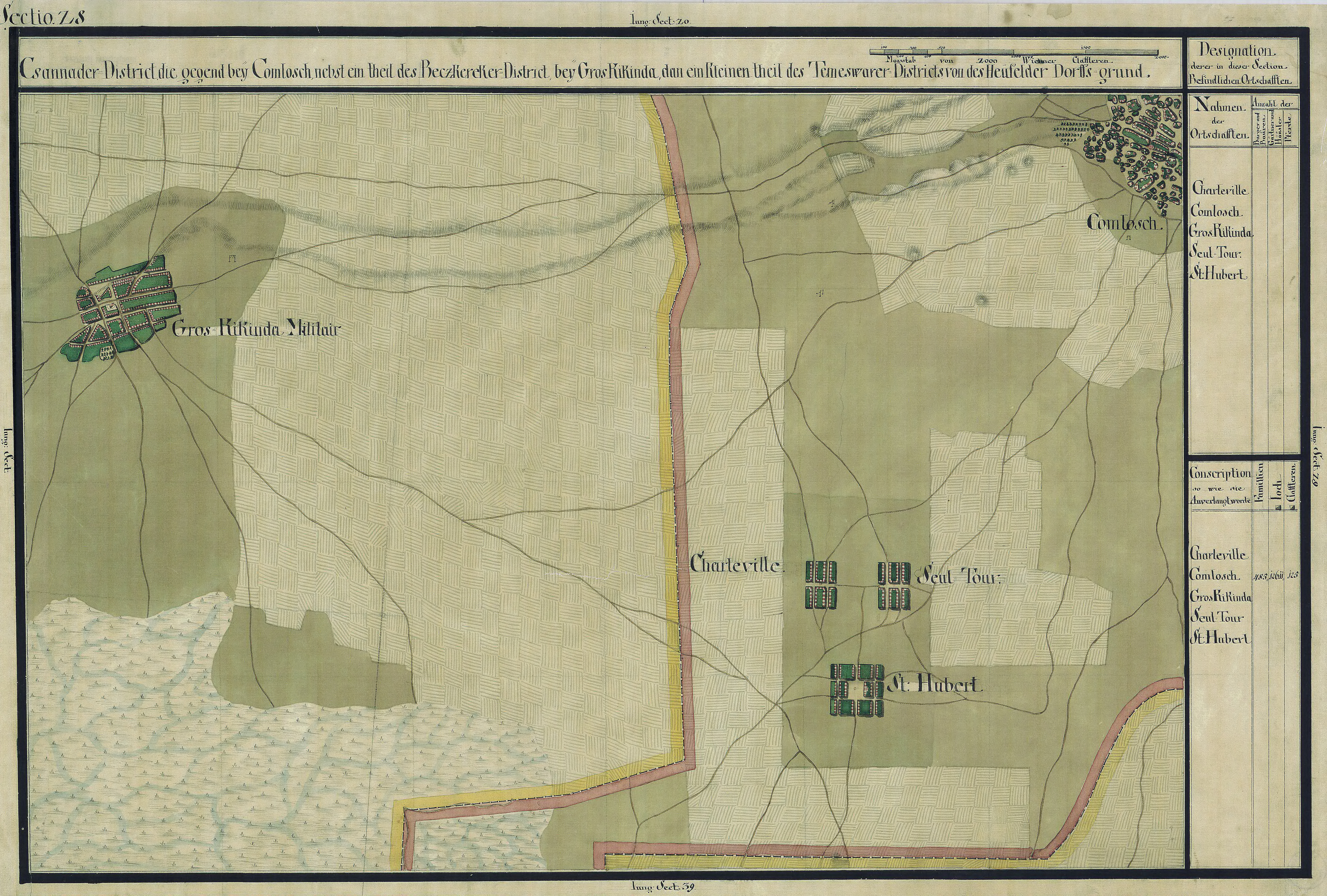
The villages of Saint-Hubert, Charleville and Seultour on the map (Josephinische Landesaufnahme, 1769–72)

Settlements with French majority in 1772
Hungarian name	German name	Established
Kisősz	Gottlob	1770
Károlyliget	Charleville	1770
Kisjécsa	Klein-Jetscha	1770
Kiskomlós	Ostern	1770
Mercyfalva	Mercydorf	1742
Nagyősz	Trübswetter (Treibswetter)	1772 (re-est.)
Németság	Segenthau	1770
Szentborbála	Seultour	1770
Szenthubert	St. Hubert	1771
Zsombolya	Hatzfeld	1766 (re-est.)

The treasury offered the immigrants support and greater freedom which made them interested in immigration to the Banat. They got land to cultivate, could build houses with the help of the treasury and tax exemption for years. The royal court always kept their interests in mind and made decisions in their benefit. They had the opportunity to take a loan (the so-called Antizipation) which they had to pay back after three years.

During the beginning of the 19th century, they assimilated into the Banat Swabian majority, a few into the Hungarians. Nowadays just their names show their French origin, but they do not speak French anymore. The longest existed their community in the three villages of Saint-Hubert, Charleville and Seultour where they stayed in majority for a long time. In the 1830s they still sung French chants during their worships, the evangelium was read in both German and French, and the preachings were held in German and French. But in just over a hundred years, the French language has also disappeared in these villages.

In the beginning of the 19th century, several French travellers visited the villages. Charles Lemercier de Longpré, baron d'Haussez reported about them in 1835. Later Henri, Count of Chambord travelled there and he became so fond of them that he bought the land and five villages – Mastort, Heufeld, Saint-Hubert, Charleville and Seultour – for 1.3 million florins.

Louis Hecht, a professor of the University of Nancy visited the French villages of the Banat in 1876. He already did not find anybody speaking French and several surnames were incorrectly recorded. The officers who came to the villages in most cases could not speak French so they wrote several names improperly, really often with German spelling. There were also some illiterate among the settlers who could not correct the spelling errors. Here is a list of names of some residents of Charleville: Ludwig Chapellie, Katharina Schirmon, Jean Düpolt, Ludwig Simono, Claude La Fleur, Joseph Piko, Anton Poussin, Karl Pigeot, Jean Peter, Le Cler, Hanry Cordie, Remillion Soissong, Jean Francois Quylion. With time several surnames changed as the population started to speak rather German. Some names were written in German: e.g. Picard -> Pikar, Bikar; Laurent -> Loran; Leblanc -> Löblan, Leblang, Leblanc; Marchand -> Marschang; Mougeon -> Muschong; Collin -> Kolleng; Aubertin -> Oberting, Oberden; Guilleaume -> Gilion, Giljon, Giljum; while others in Hungarian: Merle -> Merlei, Martin -> Martén, Houilon -> Hujjón.

After the Second World War most of their communities were expelled. Seven thousand of them were welcomed in France. In La Roque-sur-Pernes, France, they still have a compact community.

Researches of Lajos Baróti, Antal Bodor, Lénárt Bőhm, Louis Hecht, Jenő Szentkláray and Rogér Schilling provide information of the French settlements of the Banat.

From the Banat several of them moved to other parts of Hungary. Hungarians having French surnames can be found mainly in Szeged (e.g. Chambré, Cherrier, Christophe, Dippong, Frecot, Gilde, Giljon, Giljum, Kahlesz, Leblanc, Massong, Merle, Muschong, Noel, Oberting, Piar, Pierre, Pétri, Potier, Schorsch, Stufle, Vitye, Wottreng etc.). Well-known Hungarians of Banat French descent are Alessandro Bonnaz, Alajos Degré, Miklós Cherrier, Jacob Muschong and Győző Leblanc.

== Language ==
The majority of the French population in Hungary speaks French or Hungarian as their first language.

== Education ==
Gustave Eiffel French School of Budapest is a French international school in Budapest.

== Notable French people of Hungary ==
- Gyán de Vízakna
- Bonipert, Bishop of Pécs (r. 1009–1036)
- Robert, Archbishop of Esztergom (r. 1226–1239)
- Bartholomew le Gros, Bishop of Pécs (r. 1219–1251)
- Alessandro Bonnaz, Bishop of Szeged-Csanád (r. 1860–1889)

== See also ==
- France–Hungary relations
- French people
- Banat
- Hungarians in France

== Literature ==
=== 11th–13th centuries ===
- Mihály Auner : Latinus, 1916
- Géza Bárczi : A középkori vallon–magyar érintkezésekhez, 1937
- Géza Bárczi : A magyar nyelv francia jövevényszavai, Budapest, 1938

=== 18th century ===
- Dr. Sándor Kókai : A Bánság történeti földrajza (1718–1918), 2010
- László Marjanucz : Adalékok a Habsburg berendezkedés és telepítés bánsági történetéhez, 2002
- László Palásti : Franciák és a francia nyelv a Bánátban a XVIII. és XIX. században, 1958
