= Vojvodina League East =

- Founded: 2004
- Country: Serbia
- Number of clubs: 16
- Level on pyramid: 4
- Promotion to: Serbian League Vojvodina
- Relegation to: PFL Pančevo; PFL Zrenjanin
- Domestic cup(s): Serbian Cup; Vojvodina Cup
- Current champions: FK Mladost (2024–25)

The Vojvodina League East (Serbian: Vojvođanska liga "Istok") is the fourth tier of the Serbian football league system in the North Banat District, South Banat District and Central Banat District. It is one of three leagues at this level in Vojvodina, along with the Vojvodina League North and the Vojvodina League South. The league is operated by the Football Association of Vojvodina.

Vojvodina League East consists of 16 clubs who play each other in a double round-robin league, with each club playing the other club home and away. At the end of the season the top club is promoted to Serbian League Vojvodina.

== Champions history ==
Seasons	Nb. Clubs.	Champions	Points	Runners up	Points
Vojvodina League East
2004–05	16	Radnik, Stari Tamiš	54	Crvena Zvezda, Vojvoda Stepa	48
2005–06	16	Jedinstvo, Vršac	69	Radnički, Sutjeska	59
2006–07	16	Spartak, Debeljača	62	Dolina, Padina	45
2007–08	16	OFK Kikinda, Kikinda	70	Dinamo, Pančevo	53
2008–09	18	Dolina, Padina	80	Dinamo, Pančevo	69
2009–10	18	Sloboda, Novi Kozarci	74	Bačka 1901, Subotica	73
2010–11	16	Zadrugar, Lazarevo	69	Bačka Topola, Bačka Topola	61
2011–12	16	Dinamo, Pančevo	68	Bačka 1901, Subotica	66
2012–13	16	Jedinstvo, Novi Bečej	74	Bačka 1901, Subotica	70
2013–14	16	Vršac, Vršac	62	TSC, Bačka Topola	55
Banat Zone League
2014–15	16	Železničar, Pančevo	57	Borac, Sakule	48
2015–16	16	Radnički, Zrenjanin	76	Kozara, Banatsko Veliko Selo	63
Vojvodina League East
2016–17	16	Dinamo 1945, Pančevo	77	Kozara, Banatsko Veliko Selo	75
2017–18	16	OFK Vršac, Vršac	70	Kozara, Banatsko Veliko Selo	68
2018–19	16	Kozara, Banatsko Veliko Selo	76	Vojvodina 1928, Perlez	62
2019–20	16	Sloboda, Novi Kozarci	41	Jedinstvo, Banatsko Karađorđevo	40
2020–21	18	OFK Kikinda, Kikinda	75	Jedinstvo, Banatsko Karađorđevo	69
2021–22	16	Naftagas, Elemir	66	Jedinstvo, Banatsko Karađorđevo	58
2022–23	16	OFK Kikinda, Kikinda	68	Sloboda, Novi Kozarci	60
2023-24	16	Vojvodina 1928, Perlez	74	Mladost, Omoljica	68
2024-25	16	Mladost, Omoljica	72	Begej, Žitište	67

== See also ==
- Serbian SuperLiga
- Serbian First League
- Serbian League
- Serbian Zone League
