= Stupar =

Stupar is a Serbian/Bosnian/Croatian surname.

Notable people with this surname include:

- Jonathan Stupar (born 1984), American football tight end
- Milan Stupar (born 1980), Serbian footballer
- Miloš Stupar, Bosnian Serb commander
- Myroslav Stupar (born 1941), Ukrainian footballer and referee
- Nate Stupar (born 1988), American football linebacker
- Paul Stupar (1866 – 1928), Austro-Hungarian admiral
- Slobodanka Stupar (born 1947), Serbian visual artist
- Tanja Stupar-Trifunović (born 1977), Bosnian-Serbian writer
