= Branko Savić =

Serbian football manager and player

Branko Savić Бранко Савић
Personal information
- Full name: Branko Savić
- Date of birth: 8 August 1972 (age 54)
- Place of birth: Zrenjanin, SFR Yugoslavia
- Height: 1.86 m (6 ft 1 in)
- Position: Defender

Senior career*
| Years | Team | Apps | (Gls) |
| 1992–1994 | Dinamo Pančevo | 27 | (0) |
| 1994–1997 | Proleter Zrenjanin | 94 | (5) |
| 1997–2000 | Partizan | 63 | (0) |
| 2000–2001 | Beitar Jerusalem | 33 | (1) |
| 2001–2004 | Partizan | 60 | (1) |
| 2004 | Liaoning Zhongyu | 14 | (1) |
| 2005 | Proleter Zrenjanin | 13 | (0) |
| 2005–2006 | Budućnost Banatski Dvor | 25 | (1) |
| 2006–2008 | Banat Zrenjanin | 36 | (0) |
| Total | | 365 | (9) |

Managerial career
- 2015–2016: Vršac
- 2016–2018: Borac Sakule
- 2018: Bečej
- 2019: Modriča
- 2020: Vojvodina Perlez
- 2020–2022: Bečej
- * Club domestic league appearances and goals

Branko Savić (Serbian Cyrillic: Бранко Савић; born 8 August 1972) is a Serbian football manager and former player.

== Playing career ==
Savić started his senior career with Dinamo Pančevo, before moving to Proleter Zrenjanin in 1994. He was transferred to Partizan in the summer of 1997, alongside his teammate Milan Stojanoski. The duo would move to Israeli club Beitar Jerusalem in the summer of 2000, before returning to Partizan the next season. During his second spell with the Crno-beli, Savić helped the team qualify for the 2003–04 UEFA Champions League. He appeared in all six group stage matches. In 2004, Savić moved abroad for the second time by joining Chinese club Liaoning Zhongyu.

After returning to his homeland, Savić played for his former club Proleter Zrenjanin, Budućnost Banatski Dvor, as well as for newly formed Banat Zrenjanin.

== Managerial career ==
Savić started his managerial career at Serbian League Vojvodina club Vršac in early 2015.

== Honours ==
Partizan

- First League of FR Yugoslavia: 1998–99, 2001–02, 2002–03
- FR Yugoslavia Cup: 1997–98
