= Stevan Mojsilović =

Serbian football manager (born 1966)

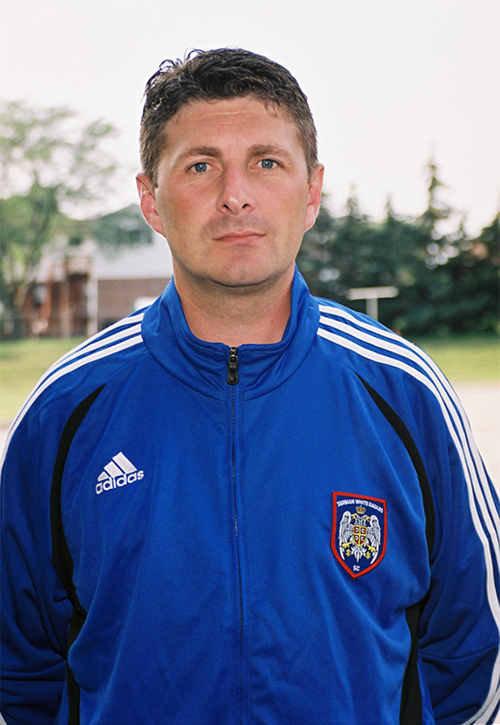
- Mojsilović in 2006

Personal information
- Date of birth: 5 December 1966 (age 59)
- Place of birth: Deliblato, SFR Yugoslavia

Youth career
- Radnički Kovin

Senior career*
Years	Team	Apps	(Gls)
1983–1991	Radnički Kovin		

Managerial career
- 1993–1995: Radnički Kovin
- 1999–2001: Dinamo Pančevo
- 2001–2002: Mogren
- 2003: Obilić
- 2004-2005: Mladi Radnik
- 2010–2011: Mogren
- 2012–2013: Domžale
- 2014: Rad
- 2014: Malavan
- 2015: Spartak Subotica
- 2016: Jagodina
- 2018: Novi Pazar
- * Club domestic league appearances and goals

Stevan Mojsilović (Serbian Cyrillic: Стеван Мојсиловић; born 5 December 1966) is a Serbian football manager and former player.

== Playing career ==
After being promoted from the Radnički Kovin youth academy at the age of 17, Mojsilović played for the senior squad from 1983 to 1991.

== Coaching career ==
Mojsilović began his coaching career early. He started off as the Radnički Kovin head coach in 1993 and remained in that position until 1995 when he became the Dinamo Pančevo youth academy director and led it from 1995 to 1996. He was then assistant coach of Obilić from 1996 to 1998 where he was assistant coach to Dragoslav Šekularac. He was assistant coach of Red Star Belgrade in the second half of the 2002–03 season. From 2004 to 2005 he was with Mladi Radnik in Požarevac and in 2006 he again collaborated with Šekularac, this time as assistant coach of the Serbian White Eagles of the Canadian Soccer League. He left the team prior to the end of the 2006 season.

In September 2014, he became the director of football of Spartak Subotica before becoming the head coach in 2015.

== Honours ==
In 2009, Mojsilović was voted the best manager in Montenegro.
