= 2015–16 Serbian League Vojvodina =

Serbian League Vojvodina
- Season: 2015–16
- Champions: OFK Odžaci
- Promoted: OFK Odžaci
- Relegated: Vršac, Banat, Dolina
- Matches played: 240
- Goals scored: 538 (2.24 per match)
- Biggest home win: Bačka 5–0 Vršac (29 August 2015); OFK Odžaci 5–0 Vršac (14 May 2016)
- Biggest away win: Vršac 1–6 Bačka (26 March 2016)
- Highest scoring: Sloga 5–3 Borac (4 June 2016)

The Serbian League Vojvodina (Serbian: Srpska liga Vojvodina) is a third tier football league in Serbia. The league is operated by the Vojvodina FA(FSV). 16 teams competed in the league for the 2015–16 season. The winner was promoted to the 2016–17 Serbian First League. Three teams were relegated from the league.

== 2015–16 teams ==
Team	City	Stadium	Capacity
Bačka	Subotica	Stadion na Somborskoj Kapiji	3,700
Banat	Zrenjanin	Karađorđev park	13,500
Borac	Sakule	Stadion Sakule	2,000
Cement	Beočin	Stadion kod Fabrike	1,500
Dunav	Stari Banovci	Stadion pod Bairom	1,000
Dolina	Padina	Stadion Padina	1,000
OFK Odžaci	Odžaci	Stadion Ivo Lola Ribar	3,000
Omladinac	Novi Banovci	Stadion FK Omladinac	1,000
Radnički	Nova Pazova	Gradski Stadion	800
Radnički	Sremska Mitrovica	Stadion FK Radnički	2,000
Radnički	Šid	Stadion FK Radnički	2,000
Senta	Senta	Stadion Senta	5,000
Sloga	Temerin	Gradski stadion	1,500
TSC	Bačka Topola	Gradski stadion	5,000
Vršac	Vršac	Gradski stadion	5,000
Železničar	Pančevo	SC Mladost	9,869

== League table ==
Pos	Team	Pld	W	D	L	GF	GA	GD	Pts	Promotion or relegation
1	OFK Odžaci (C, P)	30	17	9	4	46	18	+28	60	Promotion to Serbian First League
2	TSC	30	13	12	5	29	16	+13	51	
3	Senta	30	13	11	6	37	28	+9	50	
4	Radnički Sremska Mitrovica (Note: Radnički Sremska Mitrovica deducted 1 point.)	30	14	9	7	41	33	+8	50	
5	Radnički Nova Pazova	30	12	9	9	30	33	−3	45	
6	Bačka 1901	30	11	11	8	41	32	+9	44	
7	Železničar Pančevo	30	13	4	13	40	42	−2	43	
8	Cement Beočin	30	10	9	11	34	34	0	39	
9	Dunav Stari Banovci	30	9	11	10	33	30	+3	38	
10	Radnički Šid	30	9	11	10	22	23	−1	38	
11	Sloga Temerin	30	10	7	13	34	40	−6	37	
12	Borac Sakule	30	11	3	16	46	46	0	36	
13	Omladinac Novi Banovci	30	8	11	11	31	34	−3	35	
14	Vršac (R)	30	7	10	13	30	48	−18	31	Relegation to Zone League
15	Banat Zrenjanin (Note: Banat Zrenjanin deducted 6 points.) (R)	30	6	9	15	19	36	−17	21	Relegation to Zone League
16	Dolina Padina (Note: Dolina Padina deducted 1 point.) (R)	30	3	12	15	25	45	−20	20	Relegation to Zone League

Source: Football Association of Serbia (in English)
Rules for classification: 1) points; 2) goal difference; 3) number of goals scored.
(C) Champions; (P) Promoted; (R) Relegated

== Results ==
Home \ Away	BSU	BAN	BOS	CEM	DUN	DOL	ODŽ	ONB	RNP	RSM	RŠI	SEN	STE	TSC	VRŠ	ŽPA
Bačka 1901		0–0	3–1	3–1	2–1	1–0	1–1	0–1	1–1	2–0	0–0	2–3	3–2	1–1	5–0	2–0
Banat Zrenjanin	0–1		1–0	1–1	1–1	0–0	0–1	1–0	1–2	3–3	0–1	0–0	0–0	0–1	2–0	0–3
Borac Sakule	4–0	3–1		1–2	0–1	2–2	1–0	3–1	3–1	0–1	2–1	2–0	1–2	0–1	4–1	3–1
Cement Beočin	1–1	1–0	4–3		0–1	3–1	0–0	2–1	3–0	0–0	1–0	0–3	2–0	0–1	1–1	2–2
Dunav Stari Banovci	3–0	2–2	1–2	2–0		0–2	3–1	0–0	0–0	1–2	1–1	2–1	0–2	1–1	1–1	4–1
Dolina Padina	2–2	0–1	2–2	0–3	2–1		2–2	2–2	0–1	2–2	1–2	0–0	0–1	1–1	1–2	1–0
OFK Odžaci	0–0	1–0	4–2	2–1	0–0	2–0		2–0	3–1	2–0	0–0	2–1	4–2	3–0	5–0	2–0
Omladinac Novi Banovci	1–1	3–0	1–0	2–1	1–0	3–0	0–1		0–1	1–1	2–0	1–2	1–1	3–3	0–1	1–2
Radnički Nova Pazova	2–1	2–0	1–0	2–0	1–1	0–0	0–1	1–1		3–1	1–0	3–3	2–0	0–0	1–0	1–2
Radnički Sremska Mitrovica	0–0	3–1	1–0	0–1	3–2	3–0	1–1	3–1	3–0		1–0	1–2	1–0	1–0	1–1	2–2
Radnički Šid	2–0	0–0	2–0	1–0	0–2	0–0	2–1	1–1	3–0	0–1		0–0	0–0	0–0	2–2	2–0
Senta	1–1	4–2	1–0	0–0	0–0	2–1	0–0	3–0	0–1	1–3	0–0		2–0	2–1	1–0	1–0
Sloga Temerin	0–2	0–1	5–3	3–3	0–2	1–0	0–2	1–1	1–1	3–0	2–0	1–2		0–0	1–0	4–0
TSC	1–0	1–0	3–1	1–0	0–0	2–0	0–0	0–0	0–0	3–0	0–1	3–0	0–1		2–0	2–1
Vršac	1–6	0–1	1–1	0–0	2–0	2–2	0–3	0–1	4–1	0–0	2–1	1–1	4–0	0–0		3–1
Železničar Pančevo	2–0	2–0	1–2	2–1	2–0	2–1	1–0	1–1	1–0	1–3	3–0	1–1	3–1	0–1	3–1	

Source: Prva liga
Legend: Blue = home team win; Yellow = draw; Red = away team win.
