= Petar Divić =

Serbian football manager and player

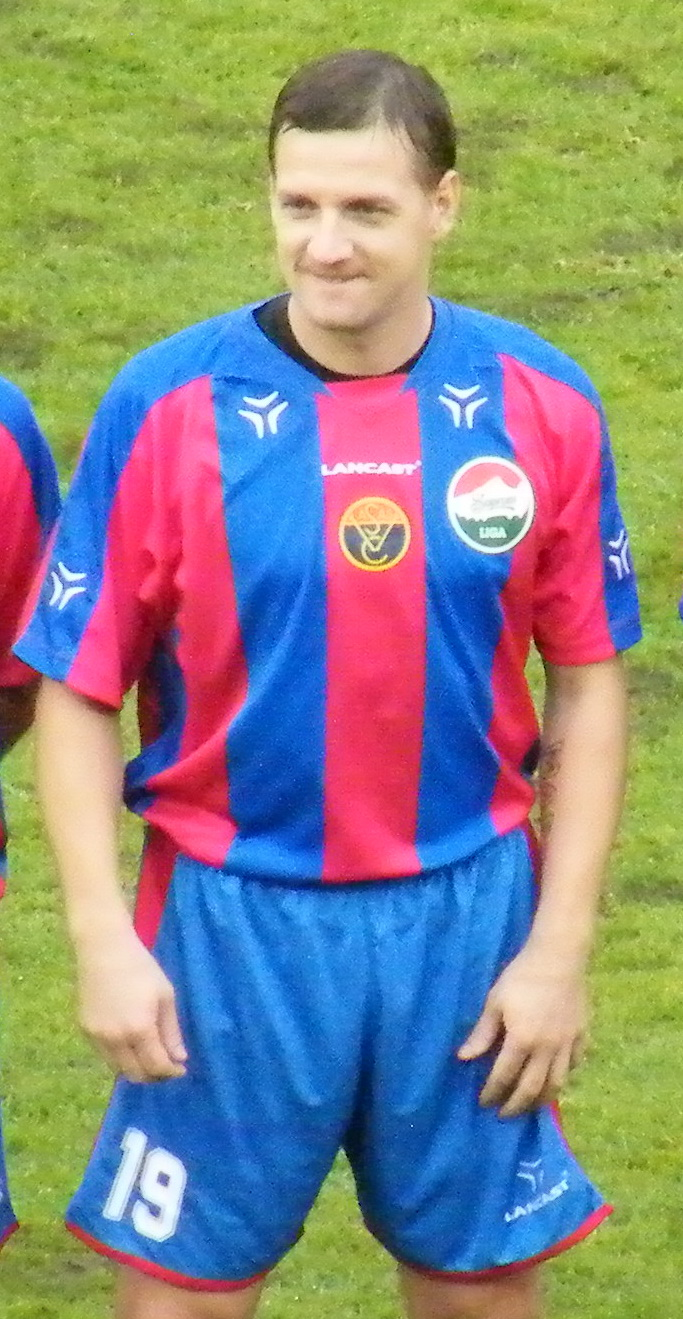
- Divić with Vasas in 2009

Personal information
- Full name: Petar Divić
- Date of birth: 11 July 1975 (age 51)
- Place of birth: Pančevo, SR Serbia, SFR Yugoslavia
- Height: 1.82 m (6 ft 0 in)
- Position: Striker

Youth career
- Dinamo Pančevo

Senior career*
Years	Team	Apps	(Gls)
1994–1996	Dinamo Pančevo		
1996–1997	Toledo	21	(4)
1997	Rad	7	(0)
1998–1999	ČSK Čelarevo		
1999–2001	OFK Beograd	76	(56)
2001–2002	Union Berlin	22	(7)
2003	Eintracht Trier	15	(0)
2005	Smederevo	10	(1)
2006–2007	Dinamo Pančevo		
2008–2010	Vasas	51	(14)
Total		202	(82)

International career
2001	FR Yugoslavia	2	(0)

Managerial career
- 2017–2018: OFK Beograd
- 2018: Dinamo 1945
- 2019–2020: Sloga Kraljevo
- 2023: Dinamo 1945
- * Club domestic league appearances and goals

Petar Divić (Serbian Cyrillic: Петар Дивић; born 11 July 1975) is a Serbian football manager and former player.

== Club career ==
Divić played for Dinamo Pančevo in the 1994–95 Second League of FR Yugoslavia, as the club suffered relegation. He spent one season with the club in the Serbian League Vojvodina, before securing a transfer to Spanish club Toledo in the summer of 1996. On his league debut, Divić netted a hat-trick in a 4–0 home win over Écija. He, however, managed to score just one more goal in the remainder of the 1996–97 Segunda División.

In the summer of 1997, Divić returned to his homeland and joined First League of FR Yugoslavia club Rad. He failed to make an impact with the Građevinari and switched to Serbian League Vojvodina side ČSK Čelarevo in the 1998 winter transfer window, immediately helping them win promotion to the Second League.

In the summer of 1999, Divić signed with OFK Beograd. He enjoyed a successful stint with the club, becoming the First League of FR Yugoslavia top scorer in the 2000–01 campaign with 27 goals. During his two and a half years with the Romantičari, Divić scored a total of 56 league goals in 76 appearances.

In December 2001, Divić moved abroad for the second time and joined Union Berlin. He scored seven times in 18 league games until the end of the 2001–02 season. Six months later, Divić was transferred to fellow Zweite Bundesliga club Eintracht Trier. He failed to score any goals in 15 league appearances.

== International career ==
At international level, Divić earned two caps for FR Yugoslavia, both at the Kirin Cup in 2001. He initially came on as a half-time substitute for Milivoje Ćirković in a 2–0 loss to Paraguay on 28 June. Six days later, on 4 July, Divić played the full 90 minutes in Dragan Stojković's national team farewell against Japan, as they lost 1–0.

== Managerial career ==
In April 2017, Divić was appointed as caretaker manager of OFK Beograd for the final weeks of the 2016–17 season. He was hired on a permanent basis in June 2017, following the club's relegation to the Serbian League Belgrade. In April 2018, Divić resigned from the position. He subsequently took charge of his hometown club Dinamo 1945.

== Career statistics ==
Club	Season	League	
Club	Season	Apps	Goals
Dinamo Pančevo	1994–95		
Dinamo Pančevo	1995–96		
Dinamo Pančevo	Total		
Toledo	1996–97	21	4
Rad	1997–98	7	0
ČSK Čelarevo	1997–98		
ČSK Čelarevo	1998–99		
ČSK Čelarevo	Total		
OFK Beograd	1999–2000	31	21
OFK Beograd	2000–01	32	27
OFK Beograd	2001–02	13	8
OFK Beograd	Total	76	56
Union Berlin	2001–02	18	7
Union Berlin	2002–03	4	0
Union Berlin	Total	22	7
Eintracht Trier	2002–03	9	0
Eintracht Trier	2003–04	6	0
Eintracht Trier	Total	15	0
Smederevo	2004–05	10	1
Dinamo Pančevo	2006–07		
Vasas	2007–08	9	2
Vasas	2008–09	18	7
Vasas	2009–10	24	5
Vasas	Total	51	14
Career total		202	82

== Honours ==
ČSK Čelarevo

- Serbian League Vojvodina: 1997–98

Individual

- First League of FR Yugoslavia top scorer: 2000–01
