= Goran Bošković (footballer, born 1966) =

Serbian footballer

Personal information
- Full name: Goran Bošković
- Date of birth: 13 July 1966 (age 60)
- Place of birth: Kovin, SFR Yugoslavia
- Height: 1.83 m (6 ft 0 in)
- Position: Forward

Youth career
- Radnički Kovin

Senior career*
Years	Team	Apps	(Gls)
1983–1991	Proleter Zrenjanin	142	(40)
1991–1993	Valenciennes	43	(16)
1993–1994	Apollon Athens	10	(0)
1994–1995	Trélissac		
1995–1996	Valenciennes		
1996–1997	Angoulême		
Total		195	(56)
- * Club domestic league appearances and goals

Goran Bošković (Serbian Cyrillic: Горан Бошковић; born 13 July 1966) is a Serbian former footballer who played as a forward.

== Career ==
After starting out at Radnički Kovin, Bošković joined Yugoslav Second League club Proleter Zrenjanin in July 1983, shortly after his 17th birthday. He helped them win promotion to the Yugoslav First League in 1990. After scoring eight goals in the 1990–91 season, his first in the top flight, Bošković moved abroad to France and signed with Division 2 club Valenciennes. He was their top scorer in his debut season, helping them win promotion to the French Division 1. In 1993–94, Bošković briefly moved to Greece and played with Apollon Athens, before returning to France.

== Honours ==
Valenciennes

- French Division 2: 1991–92
