= FK Dolina Padina =

Serbian football club

Dolina Padina
- Full name: Fudbalski Klub Dolina Padina
- Founded: 1938; 88 years ago
- Ground: Stadion FK Dolina, Padina
- Capacity: 4,000
- President: Jan Povolni
- Head coach: Igor Vakaresko
- League: PFL Pančevo
- 2024–25: PFL Pančevo, 4th of 16
Home colours	Away colours

FK Dolina Padina (Serbian Cyrillic: ФК Долина Падина) is a football club based in Padina, Vojvodina, Serbia. They compete in the PFL Pančevo, the fifth tier of the national league system.

== History ==
The club was founded as SŠK Jánošík in 1938. They were forced to stop their activities by the occupators during World War II. The club was later restored and named FK Tatra. In 1958, they eventually changed name to FK Dolina.

The club won the Vojvodina League East in the 2008–09 season and took promotion to the Serbian League Vojvodina. They spent the following four years in the third tier of Serbian football, before placing first and gaining promotion to the Serbian First League in 2013. However, the club suffered relegation back to the Serbian League Vojvodina after just one season.

== Honours ==
- Serbian League Vojvodina (Tier 3)
  - 2012–13
- Vojvodina League East (Tier 4)
  - 2008–09

== Seasons ==
Season	League									Cup
Season	Division	Pld	W	D	L	GF	GA	Pts	Pos	Cup
Serbia
2008–09	4 – Vojvodina East	34	25	5	4	79	23	80	1st	—
2009–10	3 – Vojvodina	30	13	3	14	45	40	42	7th	—
2010–11	3 – Vojvodina	30	13	7	10	35	39	46	7th	—
2011–12	3 – Vojvodina	28	10	6	12	30	36	36	12th	—
2012–13	3 – Vojvodina	30	17	7	6	55	28	58	1st	—
2013–14	2	30	9	7	14	31	42	34	14th	—
2014–15	3 – Vojvodina	30	14	9	7	35	29	51	4th	Preliminary round
2015–16	3 – Vojvodina	30	3	12	15	25	45	20 (Note: The club was docked one point.)	16th	—
2016–17	4 – Vojvodina East	30	7	1	22	30	95	22	16th	—
2017–18	5 – Pančevo	30	21	4	5	81	36	67	2nd	—
2018–19	5 – Pančevo	32	13	6	13	46	48	45	9th	—
2019–20	5 – Pančevo	17 (Note: The season was cut short due to the COVID-19 pandemic in Serbia.)	10	3	4	35	23	33	4th	—
2020–21	5 – Pančevo	30	13	8	9	63	45	47	7th	—
2021–22	5 – Pančevo	28	16	5	7	64	39	53	3rd	—
2022–23	5 – Pančevo	30	14	6	10	71	40	48	4th	—
2023–24	5 – Pančevo	30	20	3	7	79	28	63	3rd	—
2024–25	5 – Pančevo	30	16	4	10	57	39	52	4th	—

== Notable players ==
For a list of all FK Dolina Padina players with a Wikipedia article, see Category:FK Dolina Padina players.

== Managerial history ==
Period	Name
2013	(Serbia) Mile Tomić
2013–2014	(Serbia) Zoran Govedarica
2014	(Serbia) Vladimir Popov
2015	(North Macedonia) Milan Stojanoski
2015	(Serbia) Nikola Bala
2015–2016	(Serbia) Radivoje Drašković

Period	Name
2016	(Serbia) Jano Šulja
2016–2018	(Serbia) Nikola Marjanović
2018–2019	(Serbia) Damnjan Vidić
2019–2020	(Serbia) Dragan Kovačević
2020–2021	(Serbia) Dejan Žarkov
2021–	(Serbia) Igor Vakaresko
