= FK Vršac =

Serbian football club

Vršac
- Full name: Fudbalski Klub Vršac
- Founded: 1913; 113 years ago
- Dissolved: 2017
- Ground: Vršac City Stadium
- Capacity: 5,000
- 2016–17: Serbian League Vojvodina, 9th of 16
Home colours	Away colours

FK Vršac (Serbian Cyrillic: ФК Вршац) is a defunct football club based in Vršac, Vojvodina, Serbia.

== History ==
The club competed in the Vojvodina League, the third tier of Yugoslav football, between 1981 and 1988, when the competition was demoted to become the fourth tier.

At the beginning of the new millennium, the club was known as FK Jedinstvo. They won the Vojvodina League East in 2005–06 and took promotion to the Serbian League Vojvodina. During the next season, the club reverted its name back to FK Vršac.

After spending six consecutive seasons in the Serbian League Vojvodina, the club suffered relegation to the fourth tier in 2012. They would win the Vojvodina League East in the 2013–14 campaign to earn promotion back to the Serbian League Vojvodina. The club spent the next three years in the third tier, before stopping to compete.

== Honours ==
Vojvodina League East (Tier 4)

- 2005–06, 2013–14

== Seasons ==
Season	League									Cup
Season	Division	Pld	W	D	L	GF	GA	Pts	Pos	Cup
Serbia
2006–07	3 – Vojvodina	34	13	10	11	35	37	49	11th	—
2007–08	3 – Vojvodina	30	6	5	19	26	51	23	15th	—
2008–09	3 – Vojvodina	30	10	7	13	40	40	37	10th	—
2009–10	3 – Vojvodina	30	11	6	13	29	36	39	10th	—
2010–11	3 – Vojvodina	30	10	12	8	32	31	42	8th	—
2011–12	3 – Vojvodina	28	9	3	16	26	44	30	14th	—
2012–13	4 – Vojvodina East	30	17	8	5	51	17	59	4th	—
2013–14	4 – Vojvodina East	30	18	8	4	57	24	62	1st	—
2014–15	3 – Vojvodina	30	7	10	13	29	39	31	14th	—
2015–16	3 – Vojvodina	30	7	10	13	30	48	31	14th	—
2016–17	3 – Vojvodina	28	10	5	13	33	40	35	9th	—

== Notable players ==
This is a list of players who have played at full international level.

- (North Macedonia) Stevica Ristić

For a list of all FK Vršac players with a Wikipedia article, see Category:FK Vršac players.

== Managerial history ==
Period	Name
	(Serbia) Zoran Lončar
2007	(Serbia) Nebojša Petrović
2007–2008	(Serbia) Bogdan Korak
2008	(Serbia) Goran Mrđa
	(Serbia) Zoran Lončar
	(Serbia) Branko Đokić
	(Serbia) Milorad Zečević

Period	Name
	(Serbia) Nebojša Topalov
2015–2016	(Serbia) Branko Savić
2016	(Serbia) Andrija Ferlež
2016	(Bosnia and Herzegovina) Vlado Čapljić
2016–2017	(Serbia) Goran Mrđa
2017	(Serbia) Dušan Jevrić
