= Zoran Lončar (footballer) =

Serbian football manager and player

Personal information
- Full name: Zoran Lončar
- Date of birth: 13 December 1966 (age 59)
- Place of birth: Belgrade, SR Serbia, SFR Yugoslavia
- Height: 1.70 m (5 ft 7 in)
- Position: Striker

Youth career
- Palilulac Beograd

Senior career*
| Years | Team | Apps | (Gls) |
| 1984–1992 | OFK Beograd | 168 | (68) |
| 1992–1996 | Aris | 99 | (35) |
| 1997–1999 | OFK Beograd | 45 | (10) |
| 1999–2000 | Hajduk Beograd | 7 | (0) |
| Total | | 319 | (113) |

International career
| 1984–1985 | Yugoslavia U18 | 2 | (0) |

Managerial career
- 2003–2004: Voždovac
- 2005–2007: Vršac
- 2009–2011: Vršac
- 2013: Aris (assistant)
- 2014–2015: Voždovac (assistant)
- 2015: Partizan (assistant)
- 2017: Borac Banja Luka (assistant)
- 2023-: Vršac (Academy coach)
- * Club domestic league appearances and goals

Zoran Lončar (Serbian Cyrillic: Зоран Лончар; born 13 December 1966) is a Serbian football manager and former player.

== Club career ==
Lončar made his senior debut with OFK Beograd during the 1984–85 Yugoslav Second League, as the club earned promotion to the Yugoslav First League. He amassed a total of 168 appearances and scored 68 goals for the side in the nation's top two leagues combined over the course of eight seasons. In the summer of 1992, following the breakup of Yugoslavia, Lončar moved to Greece and signed with Aris. He spent the next four years with the club, making 99 appearances and scoring 35 goals in the top flight of Greek football. In the summer of 1997, Lončar returned to OFK Beograd, spending two more seasons with the Romantičari.

== International career ==
Between 1984 and 1985, Lončar represented Yugoslavia during the 1986 UEFA European Under-18 Championship qualifying, making two appearances as a substitute.

== Post-playing career ==
Between 2012 and 2013, Lončar served as sporting director for OFK Beograd, before becoming assistant manager to Zoran Milinković at Aris Thessaloniki. They subsequently worked together at Voždovac and Partizan. In November 2015, Lončar returned to OFK Beograd as sporting director.

Between 2018 and 2022, Lončar served as president of Smederevo 1924.

== Career statistics ==
| Club | Season | League | |
| Club | Season | Apps | Goals |
|---|---|---|---|
| OFK Beograd | 1984–85 | 1 | 0 |
| OFK Beograd | 1985–86 | 14 | 2 |
| OFK Beograd | 1986–87 | 30 | 20 |
| OFK Beograd | 1987–88 | 21 | 6 |
| OFK Beograd | 1988–89 | 16 | 4 |
| OFK Beograd | 1989–90 | 26 | 12 |
| OFK Beograd | 1990–91 | 30 | 9 |
| OFK Beograd | 1991–92 | 30 | 15 |
| OFK Beograd | Total | 168 | 68 |
| Aris Thessaloniki | 1992–93 | 31 | 12 |
| Aris Thessaloniki | 1993–94 | 25 | 13 |
| Aris Thessaloniki | 1994–95 | 25 | 6 |
| Aris Thessaloniki | 1995–96 | 18 | 4 |
| Aris Thessaloniki | Total | 99 | 35 |
| OFK Beograd | 1997–98 | 26 | 7 |
| OFK Beograd | 1998–99 | 19 | 3 |
| OFK Beograd | Total | 45 | 10 |
| Hajduk Beograd | 1999–2000 | 7 | 0 |
| Career total | | 319 | 113 |

== Honours ==
OFK Beograd

- Yugoslav Second League: 1984–85
