= La Roque-sur-Pernes =

La Roque-sur-Pernes La Ròca de Pèrnas (Occitan)
- Commune
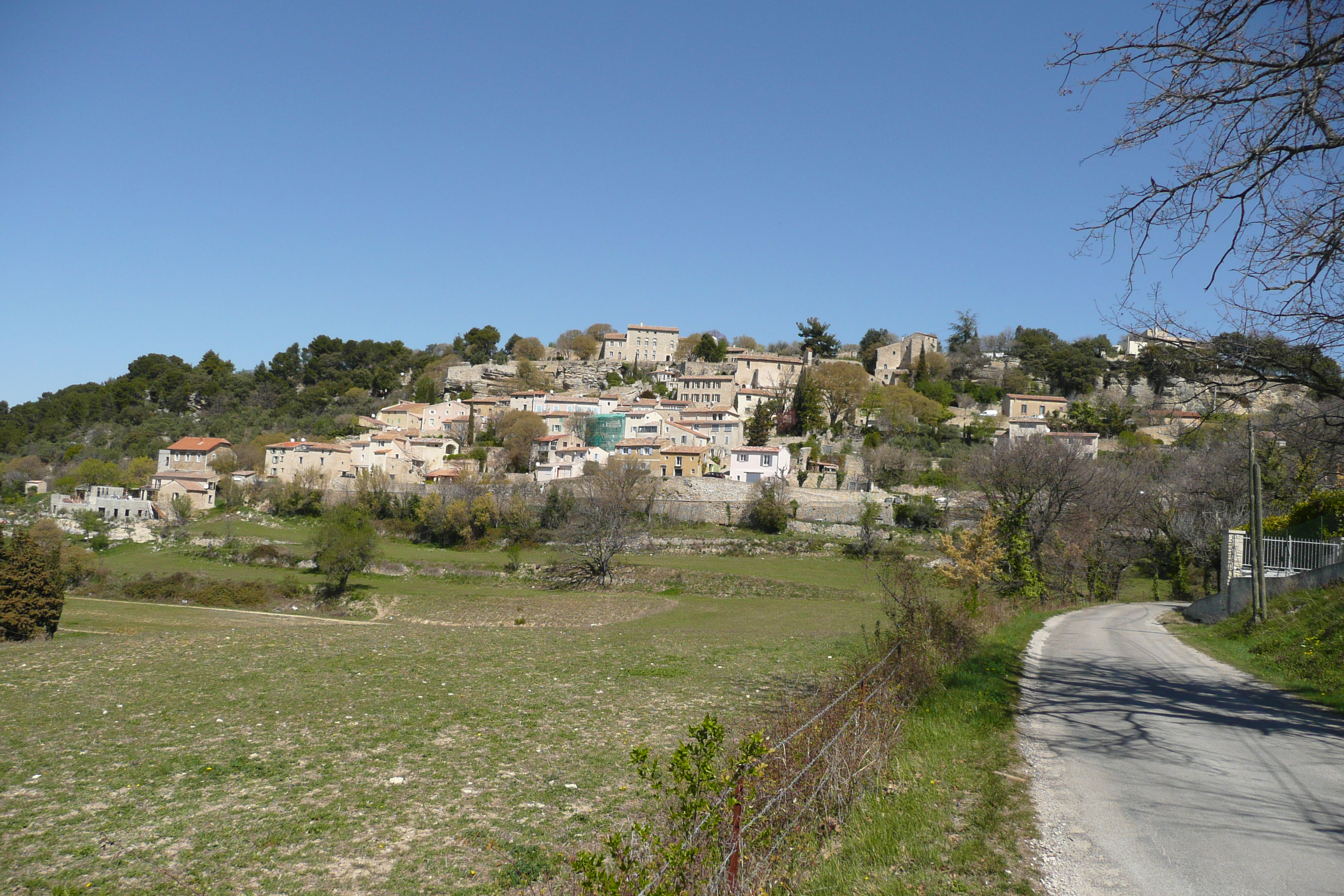
- A view of La Roque-sur-Pernes

- Coat of arms
- Location of La Roque-sur-Pernes
- Location within France Location within Provence-Alpes-Côte d'Azur
- Coordinates: 43°58′47″N 5°06′33″E
- Country: France
- Region: Provence-Alpes-Côte d'Azur
- Department: Vaucluse
- Arrondissement: Carpentras
- Canton: Pernes-les-Fontaines
- Intercommunality: CA Ventoux-Comtat Venaissin

Government
  - Mayor (2023–2026): Philippe Delebecque
- Area^{1}: 11.03 km^{2} (4.26 sq mi)
- Elevation: 290 m (950 ft)
- Highest elevation: 502 m (1,647 ft)
- Lowest elevation: 142 m (466 ft)
- Population (2023): 437
  - Density: 39.6/km^{2} (103/sq mi)
- Time zone: UTC+01:00 (CET)
  - Summer (DST): UTC+02:00 (CEST)
- INSEE/Postal code: 84101 /84210
- ^{1} French Land Register data, which excludes lakes, ponds, glaciers > 1 km^{2} (0.386 sq mi or 247 acres) and river estuaries.

La Roque-sur-Pernes (French pronunciation: [la ʁɔk syʁ pɛʁn], literally La Roque on Pernes; Occitan: La Ròca de Pèrnas) is a commune in the southeastern French department of Vaucluse. As of 2023, the population of the commune was 437.

== History ==
After the Second World War hundreds of Banat French people from Banat, a region between Romania, Serbia and Hungary, settled in the village.

== See also ==
- Communes of the Vaucluse department
