= France–Hungary relations =

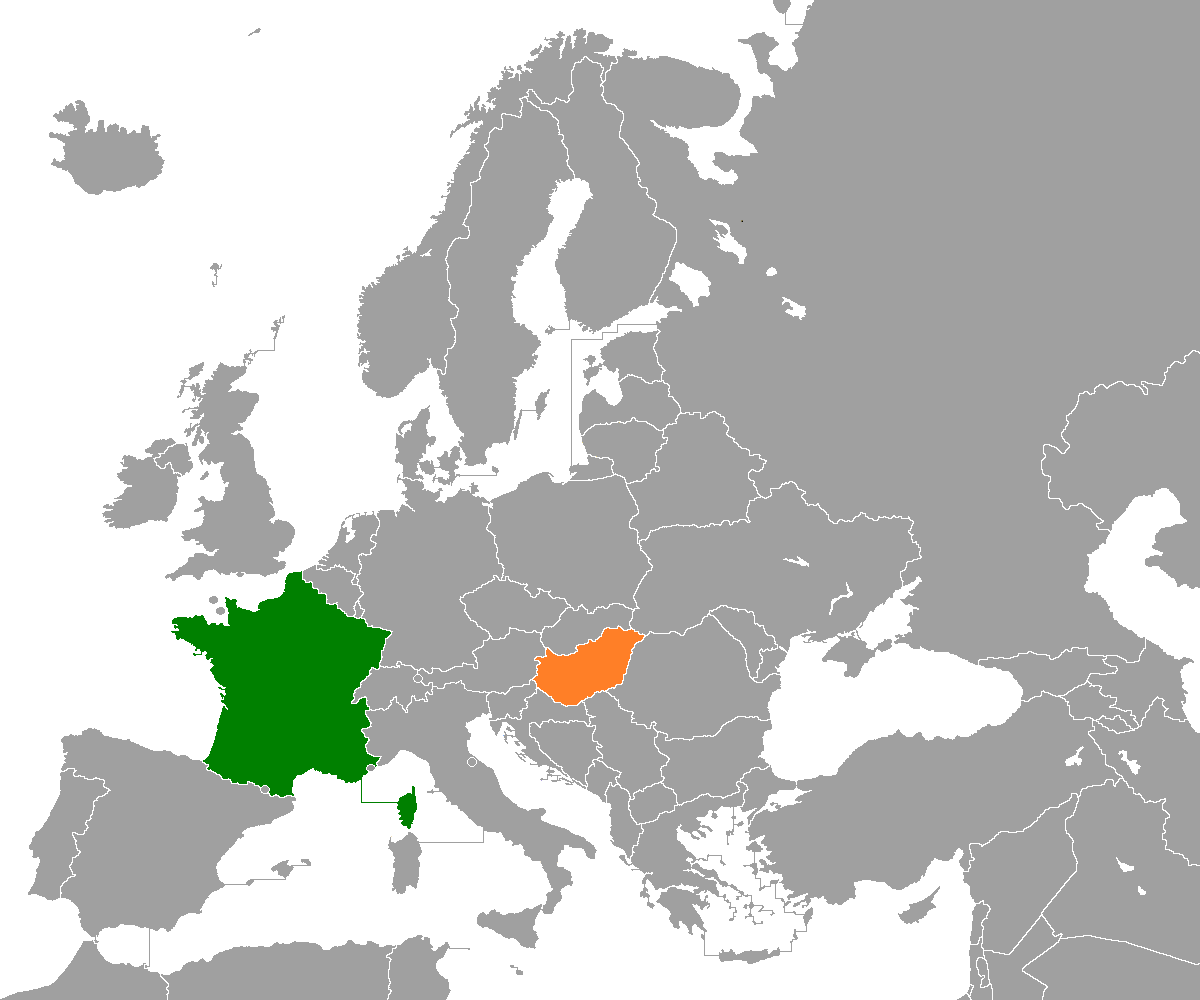

- France: Hungary

France–Hungary relations are the bilateral relations between France and Hungary. The first diplomatic contacts date back to the Middle Ages. Both countries are full members of the Council of Europe, the European Union, NATO and United Nations. Since 2004, Hungary is an observer in La Francophonie.

== Education ==
There is a French international school in Budapest, Gustave Eiffel French School of Budapest.

== Resident diplomatic missions ==
- France has an embassy in Budapest.
- Hungary has an embassy in Paris.

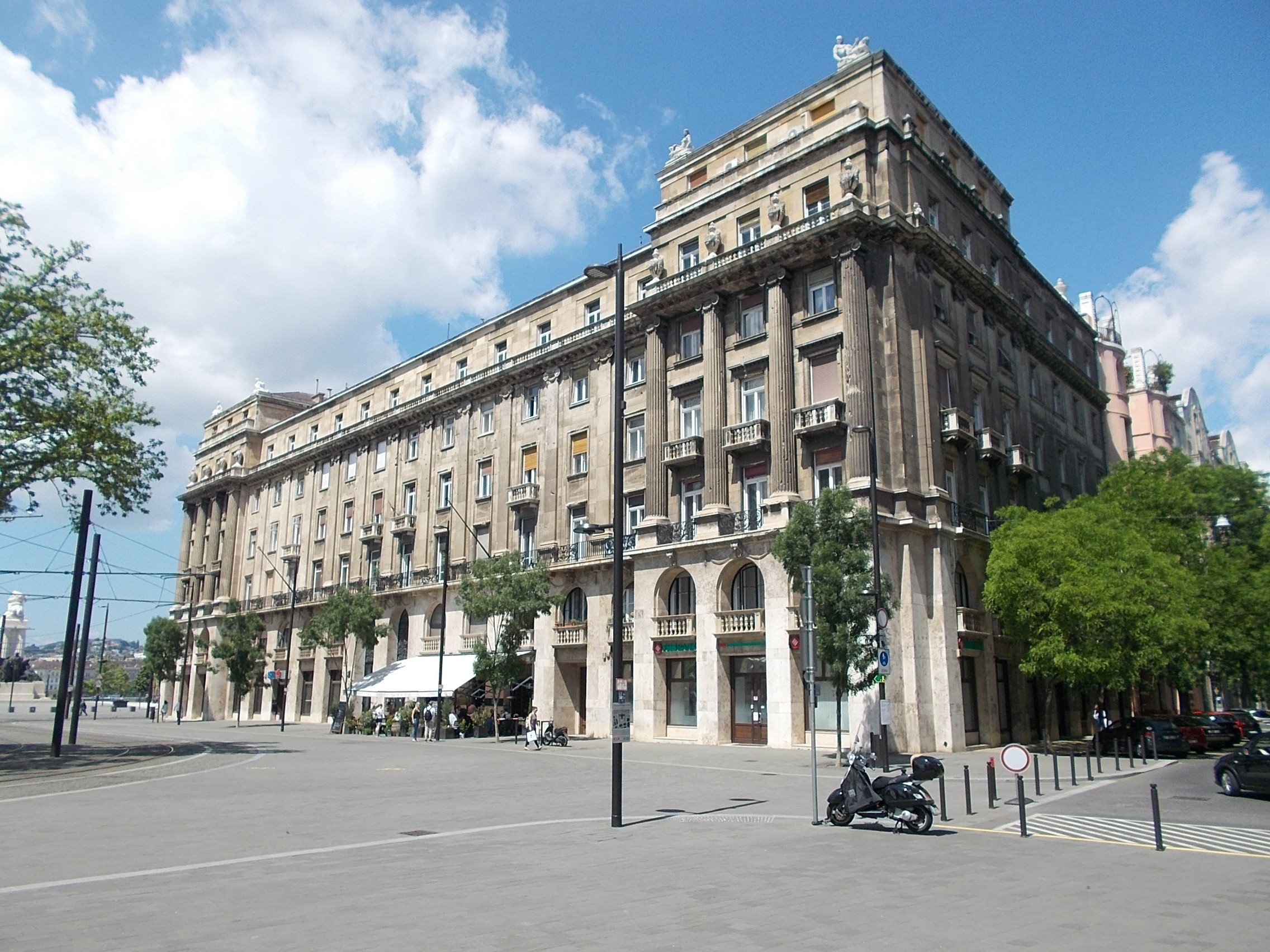
Embassy of France in Budapest

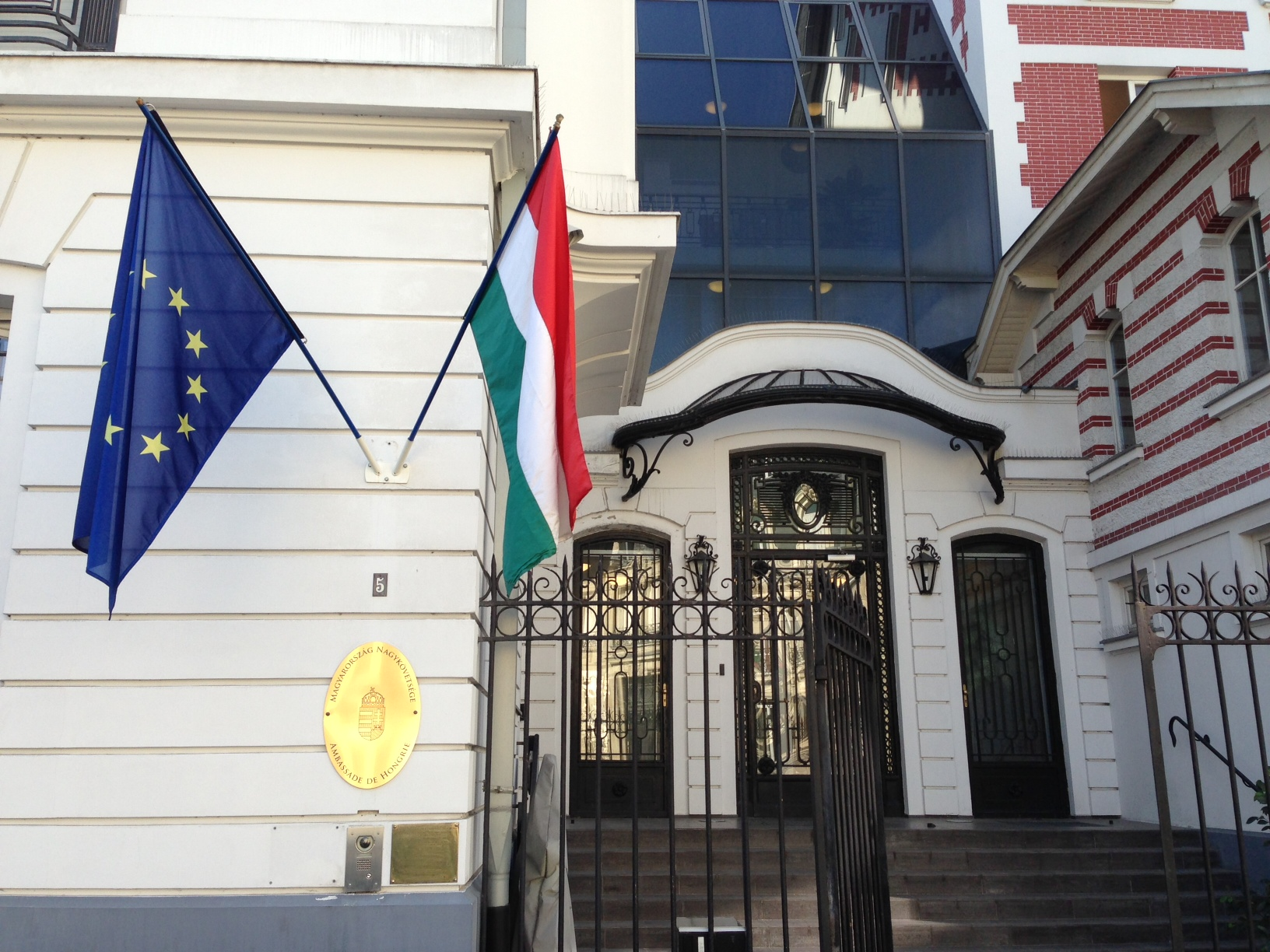
Embassy of Hungary in Paris

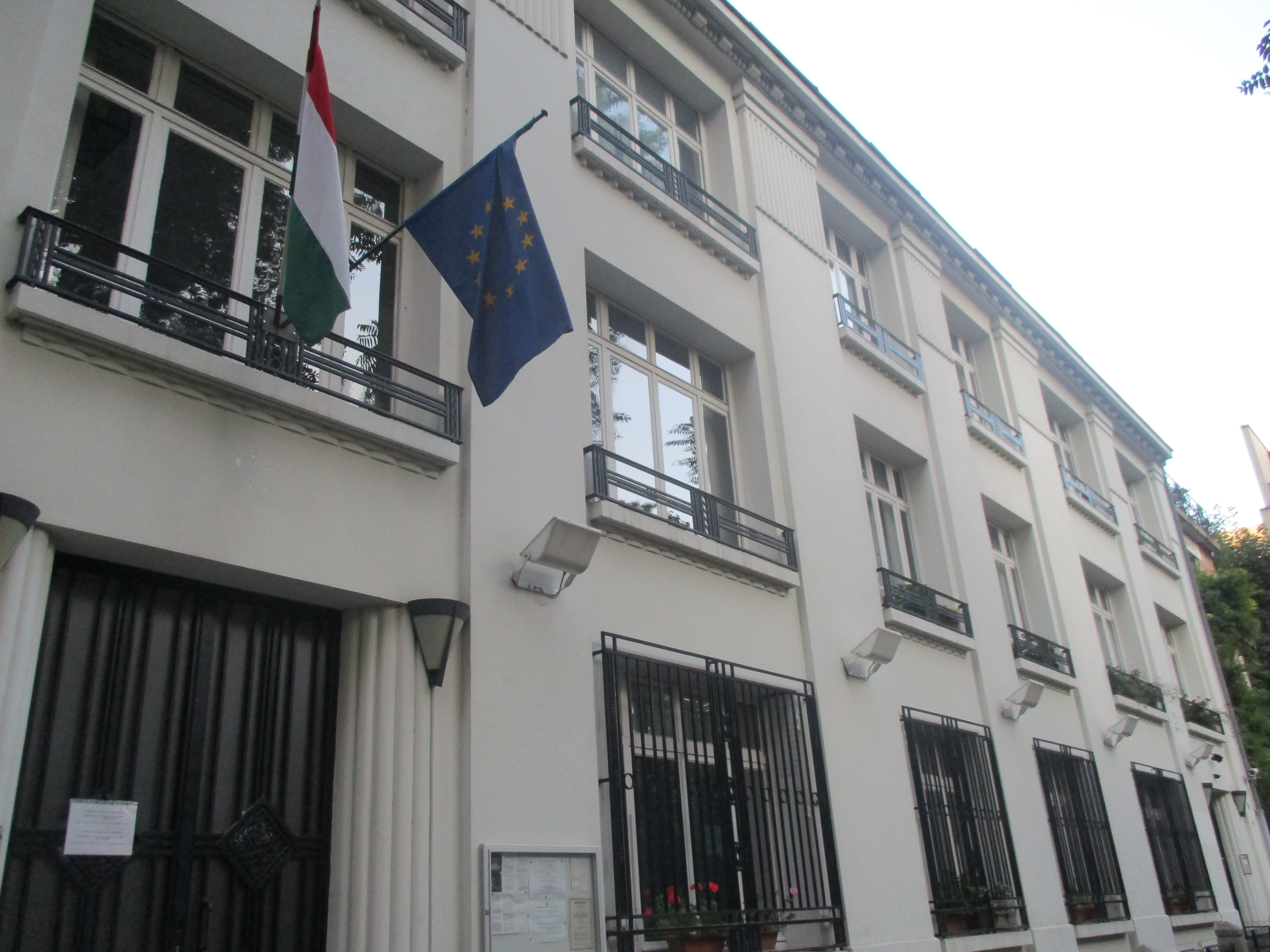
Consulate-General of Hungary in Paris

== See also ==
- Foreign relations of France
- Foreign relations of Hungary
- French people in Hungary
- Hungarians in France
