= Milan Stupar =

Serbian footballer

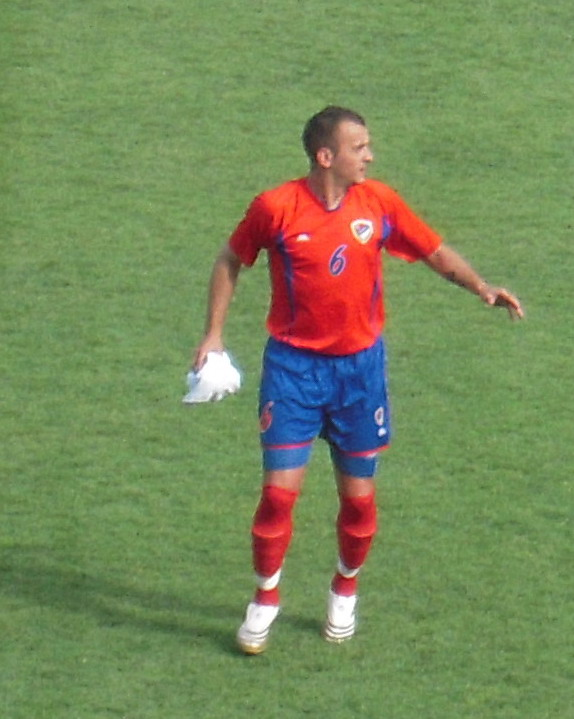

Personal information
- Date of birth: January 9, 1980 (age 46)
- Place of birth: Medulin, SFR Yugoslavia
- Height: 1.79 m (5 ft 10 in)
- Position: Right back

Youth career
- Begej Žitište

Senior career*
Years	Team	Apps	(Gls)
1997–1998	Proleter Zrenjanin	0	(0)
1998–1999	OFK Beograd	0	(0)
1999–2006	Budućnost Banatski Dvor	124	(1)
2006–2008	Banat Zrenjanin	29	(0)
2008–2013	Borac Banja Luka	99	(2)
2014–2015	Sloga Trn		
2015	Sloboda Mrkonjić Grad		
- * Club domestic league appearances and goals

Milan Stupar (Serbian Cyrillic: Милан Ступар, born January 9, 1980) is a Serbian retired footballer.

== Career ==
He started playing as a teenager in his hometown club FK Begej Žitište and soon caught the attention of the nearest top league club, FK Proleter Zrenjanin. Next he moved to Belgrade's OFK Belgrade where he stayed one season. In 1999, he signed with FK Budućnost Banatski Dvor. In the 2005-06 season, the club will merge with his previous club, FK Proleter, and change the name to FK Banat Zrenjanin. He played in the club until 2008, when moved to Premier League of Bosnia and Herzegovina club FK Borac Banja Luka.
