= OFK Odžaci =

Serbian football club

- Full name: Omladinski Fudbalski Klub Odžaci
- Founded: 2 April 1969; 56 years ago refounded in December 2014 as Hajduk Juniors
- Ground: Stadion Grbavica, Odžaci
- Capacity: 1,500
- League: MFL Sombor 1st level
- 2024–25: MFL Sombor 1st level, 13th
- Website: ofkodzaci.rs
Home colours	Away colours

Omladinski fudbalski klub Odžaci, founded in 1969, is an association football club based in Odžaci, Serbia that hosts games at the City Stadium. As of the 2025-26 season, they play in the 6th-tier MFL Sombor 1st level. The club added a youth football club in 2013.

== History ==
Originally founded in 1969 as Trgovački, the club switched places with Bratstvo Prigrevica during the 2014-15 season to play in the Serbian League Vojvodina and after winning that league they played in the Serbian First League in the 2016–17 season and finished in 15th place. The club received media attention for transportation problems in 2017.

OFK Hajduk Junior, the former PIK Prigrevica, was founded in Kula in December 2014 and moved to Odžaci to become the new OFK Odžaci on 6 February 2018.

== Recent league history ==
Season	Division	P	W	D	L	F	A	Pts	Pos
2020–21	6 - MFL Sombor 1st level	24	14	4	6	52	32	46	3rd
2021–22	6 - MFL Sombor 1st level	24	15	3	6	68	31	48	2nd
2022–23	6 - MFL Sombor 1st level	26	8	2	16	57	62	26	12th
2023–24	6 - MFL Sombor 1st level	24	8	3	13	41	64	27	10th
2024–25	6 - MFL Sombor 1st level	26	5	3	18	34	77	18	13th

== Honours ==
- Serbian League Vojvodina
  - 2015–16

== Players ==
For the list of former and current players with Wikipedia article, please see: Category:OFK Odžaci players.
