= Milan Đuričić (footballer, born 1961) =

Serbian football manager and player (1961–2022)

- Đuričić in 2021

Personal information
- Full name: Milan Đuričić
- Date of birth: 31 October 1961
- Place of birth: Zemun, PR Serbia, FPR Yugoslavia
- Date of death: 1 August 2022 (aged 60)
- Place of death: Nova Pazova, Serbia

Senior career*
Years	Team	Apps	(Gls)
- Radnički Nova Pazova

Managerial career
- 1995-1998: Radnički Nova Pazova
- Dinamo Pančevo
- Cement Beočin
- Dinamo Pančevo
- 2002: Srem
- 2002–2003: Tekstilac Odžaci
- 2003: Srem
- 2004: Beograd
- 2004: Mačva Šabac
- 2005: Vojvodina
- 2005: Srem
- 2006: Mačva Šabac
- 2007: Zemun
- 2008–2009: Inđija
- 2010: Vojvodina
- 2011: Metalac Gornji Milanovac
- 2017: Radnički Niš
- 2018: Zvijezda 09
- 2019–2020: Partizan (assistant)
- 2020: Radnički Niš
- 2021: Napredak Kruševac
- * Club domestic league appearances and goals

Milan Đuričić (Serbian Cyrillic: Милан Ђуричић; 31 October 1961 – 1 August 2022) was a Serbian football manager and player.

== Playing career ==
Đuričić spent most of his career with Radnički Nova Pazova, playing in the lower leagues of Yugoslav football.

== Managerial career ==
Đuričić began his managerial career at Radnički Nova Pazova during the 1990s. He later managed Dinamo Pančevo (twice) and Cement Beočin in the Second League of FR Yugoslavia. After a brief spell at Srem, Đuričić served as manager of Serbian League Vojvodina club Tekstilac Odžaci for the majority of the 2002–03 season.

In May 2003, Đuričić replaced Nebojša Vučićević as manager of Second League club Srem. He left his position in December 2003 and went on to take charge of league rivals Beograd later that month.

In December 2004, Đuričić was appointed as manager of Vojvodina. He was dismissed from his post in August 2005 after losing the first two league games of the season. Soon after, Đuričić returned to Srem as manager.

In March 2010, Đuričić became manager of Vojvodina for a second time. He led the club to the Serbian Cup final that year after beating Partizan 3–1 in the semi-final. In May 2010, Đuričić resigned from his position.

In March 2019, Đuričić joined Partizan as an assistant to Savo Milošević. He left the club in July 2020 in order to pursue his own managerial career. Lastly, Đuričić was manager of Serbian SuperLiga club Napredak Kruševac, before stepping down for health reasons in December 2021.

== Death ==
Đuričić died on 1 August 2022 after a long illness.
