= Gabrijel Radojičić =

Serbian footballer and manager (born 1973)

Personal information
- Full name: Gabrijel Radojičić
- Date of birth: 9 October 1973 (age 53)
- Place of birth: Mulhouse, France
- Height: 1.80 m (5 ft 11 in)
- Position: Striker

Team information
- Current team: Mladi Radnik (head coach)

Youth career
- Sloga Petrovac

Senior career*
Years	Team	Apps	(Gls)
1995–1996	Priština		
1996–1999	Rudar Pljevlja	83	(39)
1999–2000	Obilić	40	(15)
2000	Milicionar	7	(2)
2001	Grenoble		
2001–2002	Belasitsa Petrich	23	(9)
2004	Radnički Kragujevac	13	(10)
2004–2005	ESA Brive		
2005	Obilić	10	(1)
2006	Kitchee	3	(0)
2006	Vujić Voda	12	(2)
2007	Čelik Zenica	11	(2)
2007–2009	Sloga Petrovac	51	(18)
2009	Palilulac Beograd	11	(1)
2010	ASA Issy		
Total		264	(99)

Managerial career
- 2016–2017: Jedinstvo Paraćin
- 2017: Takovo
- 2018: Sremčica
- 2018: Bačka (assistant)
- 2019: Sloga 33
- 2020–2021: Radnički Kovin
- 2021–2022: Mladi Radnik
- * Club domestic league appearances and goals

Gabrijel Radojičić (Serbian Cyrillic: Габријел Радојичић; born 9 October 1973) is a Serbian football manager and former striker.

During his journeyman career, Radojičić played professionally in Serbia and Montenegro, France, Bulgaria, Hong Kong, and Bosnia and Herzegovina.

== Playing career ==
After spending three years at Rudar Pljevlja, Radojičić signed with Obilić in 1999. He was the team's leading scorer in his debut season with 15 league goals. After playing in two games for Obilić at the start of the new season, Radojičić switched to city rivals Milicionar.

In early 2001, Radojičić moved to France and joined Grenoble. He helped the club win the Championnat National later that season. In early 2002, Radojičić signed with Bulgarian club Belasitsa Petrich, spending there the next two years.

== Managerial career ==
Radojičić was manager of several lower league clubs, including Serbian League East's Jedinstvo Paraćin and Serbian League West's Sloga 33.
