= Marko Mitrušić =

Bosnian-Herzegovinian footballer

Personal information
- Full name: Marko Mitrušić
- Date of birth: 16 December 1991 (age 34)
- Place of birth: Sarajevo, SFR Yugoslavia
- Height: 1.88 m (6 ft 2 in)
- Position: Defensive midfielder

Senior career*
Years	Team	Apps	(Gls)
2009–2010	Šumadija Jagnjilo	31	(4)
2011	Sopot	4	(0)
2011–2012	Metalac Gornji Milanovac	12	(0)
2012–2013	Mladenovac	29	(0)
2013–2015	Bežanija	27	(5)
2015–2016	Donji Srem	20	(5)
2016	Bežanija	8	(1)
2017	Sopot		
- * Club domestic league appearances and goals as of 14 June 2016

Marko Mitrušić (Serbian Cyrillic: Марко Митрушић; born 16 December 1991) is a Bosnian-Herzegovinian football defender.
