= Branimir Brstina =

Serbian actor

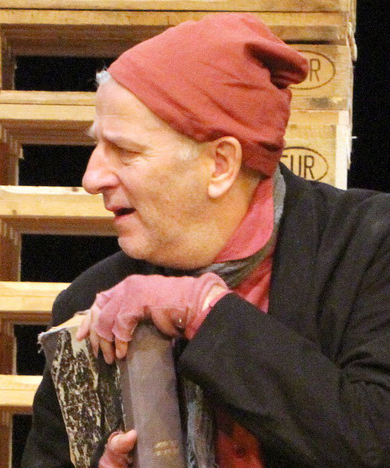
- Brstina acting in the Carlo Goldoni play The Servant of Two Masters (directed by Boris Liješević) in 2012
- Born: 4 January 1960 (age 66); Banatsko Veliko Selo, FPR Yugoslavia
- Other name: Bane
- Occupation: Actor
- Years active: 1982–present

Branimir Brstina (Serbian Cyrillic: Бранимир Брстина; born 4 January 1960) is a Serbian actor.

== Biography ==
He completed his elementary and secondary education in Zrenjanin. He graduated from the Faculty of Dramatic Arts in Belgrade in 1982, in the class of Professor Minja Dedić. His classmates included Sonja Savić, Žarko Laušević, Zoran Cvijanović, Svetislav Gončić, Suzana Petričević, and Andreja Maričić.

He played his first role after graduation at the National Theatre in Belgrade, in the play Lenin, Stalin, Trotsky.

In 1983, he became a permanent member of Atelje 212. In 2014, he was elected director of the theatre.
