= Gustave Eiffel French School of Budapest =

- Lycée Français Gustave Eiffel de Budapest; Gustave Eiffel Francia Óvoda Általános Iskola és Gimnázium
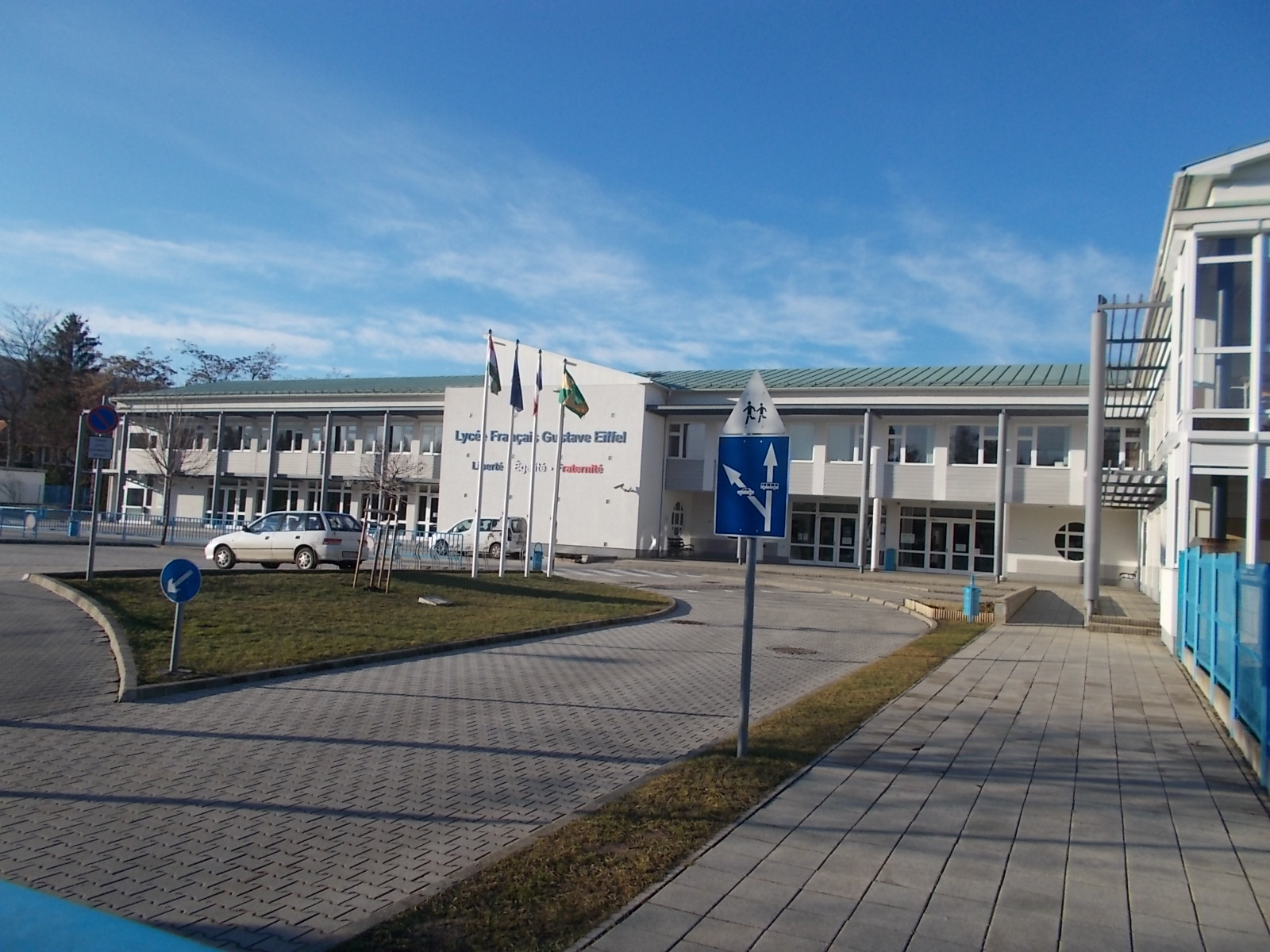

Location
- 1029 Budapest, Máriaremetei út 193-199; Budapest; Hungary
- Coordinates: 47.5644°N 18.9479°E

Information
- Type: French international school
- Website: lfb.hu

Gustave Eiffel French School of Budapest (French: Lycée Français Gustave Eiffel de Budapest, LFGEB, Hungarian: Gustave Eiffel Francia Óvoda Általános Iskola és Gimnázium), also known as the French School of Budapest (French: Lycée Français de Budapest, LFB, Hungarian: Budapesti Francia Iskola) is a French international school in Budapest, Hungary. It serves levels early childhood (maternelle) through high school (lycée).

== See also ==
- France–Hungary relations
- French people in Hungary
