= Anđelko Đuričić =

Serbian footballer (born 1980)

Personal information
- Full name: Anđelko Đuričić
- Date of birth: 21 November 1980 (age 45)
- Place of birth: Pančevo, SR Serbia, SFR Yugoslavia
- Height: 1.94 m (6 ft 4 1/2 in)
- Position: Goalkeeper

Youth career
- Dunav Stari Banovci

Senior career*
| Years | Team | Apps | (Gls) |
| 2000–2002 | Dinamo Pančevo | 67 | (0) |
| 2002–2009 | Hajduk Kula | 141 | (0) |
| 2009–2011 | União Leiria | 27 | (0) |
| 2011-2012 | Al Ittihad | | |
| 2012 | Donji Srem | 2 | (0) |
| 2013 | Borac Čačak | 10 | (0) |
| 2013–2015 | Jagodina | 37 | (0) |
| 2016–2017 | Mosta | 0 | (0) |
| Total | | 284 | (0) |

International career
| 2010 | Serbia | 4 | (0) |
- * Club domestic league appearances and goals as of 23 July 2018

Anđelko Đuričić (Serbian Cyrillic: Анђелко Ђуричић; born 21 November 1980) is a Serbian retired professional footballer who played as a goalkeeper. He represented Serbia at the 2010 FIFA World Cup.

== Club career ==
Đuričić started out at Dunav Stari Banovci, before moving to Dinamo Pančevo. He was transferred to Hajduk Kula in 2002, spending the following seven seasons at the club. In the summer of 2009, Đuričić moved abroad and signed with Portuguese club União Leiria. He was the team's first-choice goalkeeper in his debut season at the Estádio Dr. Magalhães Pessoa, missing only four league games. However, Đuričić lost his place on the team to Eduardo Gottardi in the following 2010–11 season, before eventually leaving the club.

== International career ==
Đuričić made his international debut for Serbia in a 0–1 friendly loss against New Zealand on 29 May 2010, coming on as a substitute for Vladimir Stojković at half-time and managing to keep a clean sheet in the process.

He was subsequently selected by Radomir Antić in the final 23-man squad for the 2010 FIFA World Cup, as the third-choice goalkeeper behind Stojković and Bojan Isailović.
