= Egreš =

Municipality of Slovakia

Egreš Szécsegres
- Municipality
- Flag Coat of arms

- Location of Egreš in the Košice Region Location of Egreš in Slovakia
- Coordinates: 48.62°N 21.62°E
- Country: Slovakia
- Region: Košice Region
- District: Trebišov District
- First mentioned: 1272

Government
  - Mayor: Gabriela Timková (Hlas, Smer-SD)

Area
  - Total: 5.60 km^{2} (2.16 sq mi)
- Elevation: 145 m (476 ft)

Population (2025)
  - Total: 476
- Time zone: UTC+1 (CET)
  - Summer (DST): UTC+2 (CEST)
- Postal code: 761 1
- Area code: +421 56
- Vehicle registration plate (until 2022): TV
- Website: www.obecegres.sk

Egreš (Hungarian: Szécsegres) is a village and municipality in the Trebišov District in the Košice Region of eastern Slovakia.

== History ==
In historical records, the village was first mentioned in 1272 AD.

== Geography ==
The municipality lies at an altitude of 145 metres (476 ft) and covers an area of 5.60 km^{2} (2.16 sq mi) (2025).

== Population ==
Population statistic (10 years)
Year	1995	2005	2015	2025
Count	419	438	480	476
Difference		+4.53%	+9.58%	−0.83%

Population statistic
Year	2024	2025
Count	479	476
Difference		−0.62%

It has a population of 476 people (31 December 2025).

=== Ethnicity ===
Census 2021 (1+ %)
Ethnicity	Number	Fraction
Slovak	438	95.01%
Not found out	23	4.98%
Romani	5	1.08%
Total	461	

In year 2021 was 461 people by ethnicity 438 as Slovak, 23 as Not found out, 5 as Romani and 2 as Czech.

Note on population: The difference values of population numbers in the table "Population statistic" and in the sections "Ethnicity" & "Religion" is caused by the use of various statistical methods.

=== Religion ===
Census 2021 (1+ %)
Religion	Number	Fraction
Roman Catholic Church	257	55.75%
Greek Catholic Church	89	19.31%
Calvinist Church	35	7.59%
Not found out	33	7.16%
None	32	6.94%
Jehovah's Witnesses	7	1.52%
Total	461	

In year 2021 was 461 people by religion 257 from Roman Catholic Church, 89 from Greek Catholic Church, 35 from Calvinist Church, 33 from Not found out, 32 from None, 7 from Jehovah's Witnesses, 4 from Eastern Orthodox Church, 3 from Evangelical Church and 1 from Other and not ascertained christian church.

== Facilities ==
The village has a public library and a football pitch.

== Genealogical resources ==
The records for genealogical research are available at the state archive "Statny Archiv in Kosice, Slovakia"

- Roman Catholic church records (births/marriages/deaths): 1723-1896 (parish B)
- Reformated church records (births/marriages/deaths): 1756-1952 (parish B)

== See also ==
- List of municipalities and towns in Slovakia
