= Győző Leblanc =

Hungarian opera singer, actor, and director

- Born: 28 March 1947 (age 79); Budapest, Hungary
- Genres: Opera, operetta
- Occupations: Singer, actor, director
- Years active: 1975–present

Győző Leblanc (born March 28, 1947, Budapest, Hungary) is a well-known Hungarian tenor opera singer, actor and director.

== Life ==
He was born in Budapest on March 28, 1947. He continued his solo studies between 1969 and 1975 at the Franz Liszt Academy of Music where his teachers were Éva Kutrucz and Jenő Sipos. After graduating, he became a private ensemble of the Hungarian State Opera House, and he also featured a lot of operettas. He has performed abroad many times, because of that he is often called the Traveling Operative Ambassador of the Hungarian operetta. His memorable roles include Rodolfo of Puccini's La Bohéme and Pinkerton of Puccini's Madama Butterfly, Erkel's Bánk bán, Don José of Bizet's Carmen and numerous operetta bonviva characters. In his 40 years of career, he has been singing as a director and even in films.

== Personal life ==
He states about his ancestors: "our family formerly used my surname as Le'Blanc, which means white in French. There are not many Leblanc in Hungary, but the French directories can prove that this is a common name in France, like the name Kovács in Hungary. My ancestors came from a small mining village, Saint-Hubert in Alsace-Lorraine. Then my great-great-grandfather moved to Vienna, where he met his Austrian wife, and after the introduction of the settlement policies of Maria Theresa, they came to Banat."

After his first marriage with Katalin Pitti he married Zsuzsanna Csonka opera singer. They had together two sons, Győző and Gergely. He married again. His third wife is Éva Tóth.
