= OFK Begej Žitište =

OFK Begej
- Full name: Omladinski fudbalski klub Begej
- Founded: 1930; 96 years ago
- Ground: Stadium "Dragan Vučurević Vučko", Žitište, Serbia
- Capacity: 1666
- Chairman: Borko Kukolj
- League: Vojvodina League East
- 2024/25: Vojvodina League East, 2nd
Home colours	Away colours

OFK Begej (Serbian Cyrillic: OФК Бегеј) is a Serbian football club based in Žitište, Serbia. They play in the 4th-tier Vojvodina League East.

The club almost fell apart in the 2022/23 season after both management en head coach Jovica Milin left the club, but they managed to survive in the end when they were taken over by former footballer Slobodan Dubajić.

== Recent league history ==
Season	Division	P	W	D	L	F	A	Pts	Pos
2020–21	Vojvodina League East	32	16	1	15	71	61	49	9th
2021–22	Vojvodina League East	30	10	12	8	34	29	42	9th
2022–23	Vojvodina League East	30	9	4	17	45	72	31	14th
2023–24	Vojvodina League East	30	13	5	12	47	42	44	5th
2024–25	Vojvodina League East	30	22	1	7	65	30	67	2nd
