= Rusko Selo =

Rusko Selo Руско Село (Serbian) Torontáloroszi (Hungarian)
- Village (Selo)
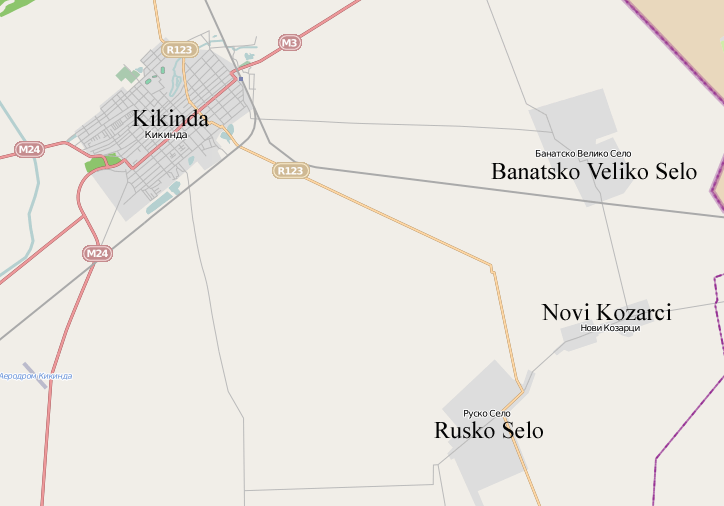
- Map of Rusko Selo and other settlements in the neighborhood

- Location of Rusko Selo within Serbia Rusko Selo (Serbia) Rusko Selo (Europe)
- Coordinates: 45°45′28″N 20°34′11″E
- Country: Serbia
- Province: Vojvodina
- Region: Banat
- District: North Banat
- Municipality: Kikinda
- Elevation: 71 m (233 ft)

Population (2011)
  - Rusko Selo: 2,811
- Time zone: UTC+1 (CET)
  - Summer (DST): UTC+2 (CEST)
- Postal code: 23314
- Area code: +381(0)230
- Car plates: KI

Rusko Selo (Serbian Cyrillic: Руско Село; Hungarian: Torontáloroszi) is a village in northeastern Serbia, located within the Kikinda municipality, North Banat District, Vojvodina.

== Name ==
In Serbian the village is known as Rusko Selo (Руско Село), meaning Ruthenian Village after Pannonian Rusyns community settled there in 1740s. The village is also often mistranslated as Russian Village due to the archaic homonyms used as the possessive adjectives related both to the local Pannonian Rusyns and ethnic Russians. In German it is known as Ruskodorf, and in Hungarian as Kisorosz or Torontáloroszi. In Pannonian Rusyn, it is known as Руске Село, theoretically also denoting "Rusyn village", although the noun село is not used as the standard Rusyn word for "village", and is only used in place names that bear the word "Selo" in Serbian.

== History ==
In the Middle Ages, the settlement was known as Oroszi. During Ottoman times, it was populated by Serbs. In 1718, it was incorporated into the Habsburg province of Banat of Temeswar, at which time it was known in Serbian as Mali Orosin. In 1723–25, the place was uninhabited. It was repopulated in 1767 by German colonists, while Hungarian colonists were settled in the village in 1776. In the 19th century, Romanians settled in the village as well. After World War I, a new settlement known as Kolonija or Čarnojevićevo was built near the old village. After World War II, Serb refugees from Bosnia settled in the village.

== Culture ==
- Serbian Orthodox church of the Ascension of Holy Madonna, built in 1797
- Roman Catholic church of St. Peter and Paul, built between 1802 and 1832
- Čarnojević family mausoleum (sr)
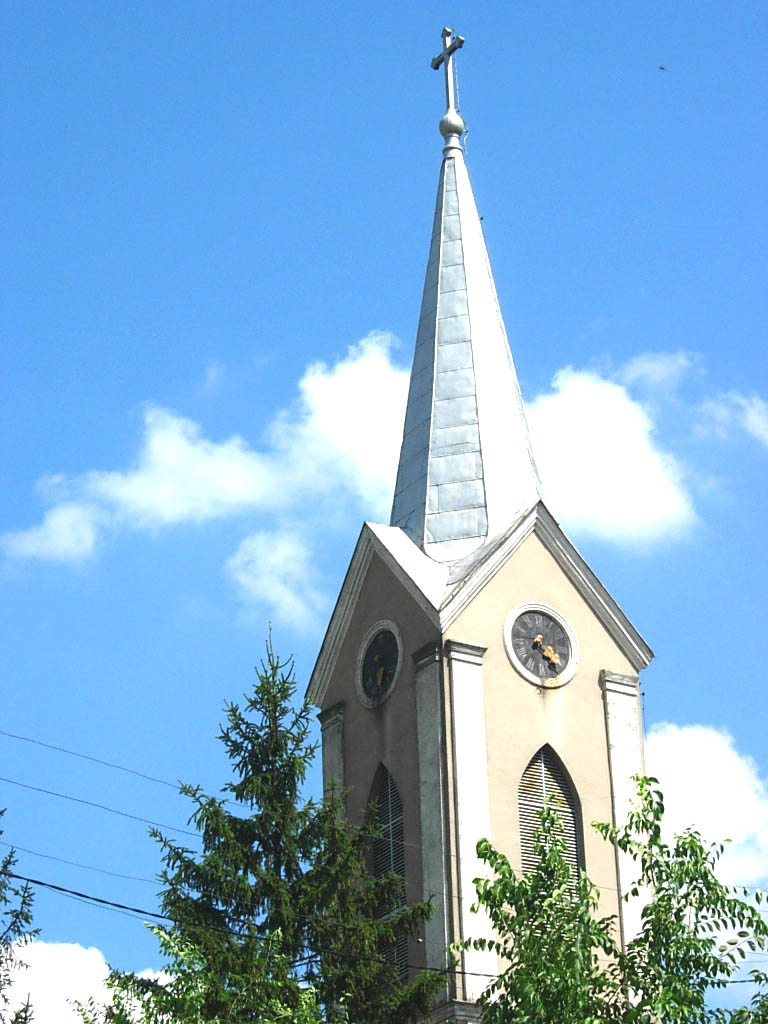
Catholic church

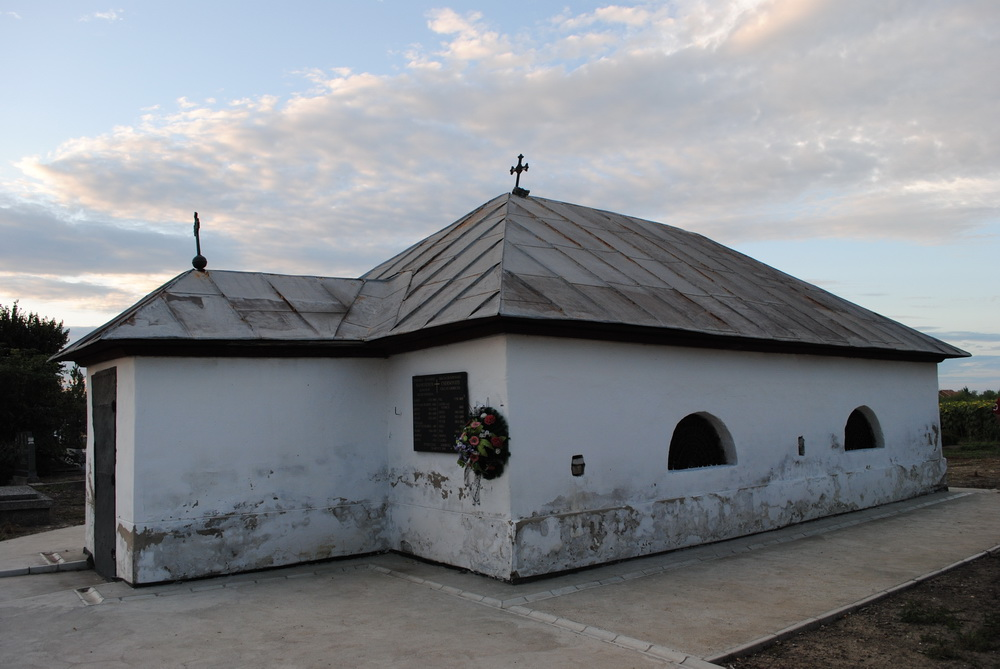
Čarnojević family mausoleum

== Demographics ==
The village has a Serb ethnic majority and a population of 2,811 (2011 census).

In 2002 village had population of 3,328 and ethnic groups in the village were: Serbs (1,880) or 56.49%, Hungarians (1,181) or 35.48%, Yugoslavs (55), Roma (48), Montenegrins (43), Croats (18), Ukrainians (12), etc.

Historical population

- 1948: 4,294
- 1953: 4,341
- 1961: 4,143
- 1971: 3,830
- 1981: 3,657
- 1991: 3,510
- 2002: 3,328

== See also ==
- List of places in Serbia
- List of cities, towns and villages in Vojvodina
