= FK Dinamo Pančevo =

Serbian football club

Dinamo Pančevo
- Full name: Fudbalski Klub Dinamo Pančevo
- Nickname: Brzi voz (The Fast Train)
- Founded: 1945; 81 years ago
- Dissolved: 2015
- Ground: Pančevo City Stadium
- Capacity: 4,569
- 2014–15: Serbian League Vojvodina, 10th of 16
Home colours	Away colours

FK Dinamo Pančevo (Serbian Cyrillic: ФК Динамо Панчево) was a football club based in Pančevo, Vojvodina, Serbia.

The club, founded in 1945, should not be confused with Dinamo 1945, founded in 2014.

== History ==
Founded in 1945, the club made its competitive debut in the 1946–47 Serbian League, placing second in Group North behind Sloga Novi Sad. They subsequently lost to Torpedo Sarajevo in the playoffs for the Yugoslav First League, but instead qualified to the newly formed Yugoslav Second League. The club spent two seasons in the second tier before being relegated to the newly formed Yugoslav Third League in 1950.

Between 1968 and 1974, the club competed in the Yugoslav Second League, including five seasons in Group North and one in Group West, before suffering relegation to the Vojvodina League. They spent two seasons in the third tier before being relegated to the fourth tier of Yugoslav football in 1976. The club promptly returned to the third tier in 1977. They won the Vojvodina League in 1985–86, but were immediately relegated from the Second League.

After the breakup of Yugoslavia in 1992, the club competed in the Second League of FR Yugoslavia for three seasons, before suffering relegation to the newly formed Serbian League Vojvodina in 1995. They spent just one year in the third tier, finishing as runners-up and taking promotion back to the Second League. Over the next seven seasons, the club remained in the second tier. They were relegated to the Serbian League Vojvodina in 2003 and subsequently to the Vojvodina League East in 2004. The club was eventually relegated to the fifth tier after finishing bottom of the table in 2004–05.

In the summer of 2006, the club merged with local rivals FK PSK and participated in the 2006–07 Serbian League Vojvodina, but failed to avoid relegation to the Vojvodina League East. They spent the following five years in the fourth tier. The club finished first in the 2011–12 season and returned to the Serbian League Vojvodina. They played in the third tier until 2015, before withdrawing from the competition.

== Honours ==
- Vojvodina League (Tier 3)
  - 1959–60, 1985–86
- Vojvodina League/Vojvodina League East (Tier 4)
  - 1964–65, 1990–91 / 2011–12

== Notable players ==
This is a list of players who have played at full international level.

- (Serbia) Anđelko Đuričić
- (Serbia) Bojan Jorgačević
- (Serbia and Montenegro) Petar Divić
- (Serbia and Montenegro) Aleksandar Pantić
- (Serbia and Montenegro) Zoran Ranković
- (Serbia and Montenegro) Dragan Vukmir
- (Socialist Federal Republic of Yugoslavia) Stevan Bena
- (Socialist Federal Republic of Yugoslavia) Prvoslav Dragićević
- (Socialist Federal Republic of Yugoslavia) Blagoje Marjanović

For a list of all FK Dinamo Pančevo players with a Wikipedia article, see Category:FK Dinamo Pančevo players.

== Managerial history ==
Period	Name
1947-1948	(Socialist Federal Republic of Yugoslavia) Blagoje Marjanović
1951	(Socialist Federal Republic of Yugoslavia) Blagoje Marjanović
	(Serbia and Montenegro) Miloljub Ostojić
	(Serbia and Montenegro) Milan Đuričić
1999-2001	(Serbia and Montenegro) Stevan Mojsilović
	(Serbia and Montenegro) Milan Đuričić
2003	(Serbia and Montenegro) Nebojša Petrović
	(Serbia) Zoran Madževski
	(Serbia) Goran Mrđa

Period	Name
2011–2012	(Serbia) Timotije Davidović
2012	(Serbia) Aleksandar Stevanović
2013	(Serbia) Goran Mrđa
2013	(Serbia) Žarko Todorović
2014	(Serbia) Goran Mrđa
2015	(Serbia) Žarko Todorović
