= 2006–07 Serbian League Vojvodina =

== League table ==
Pos	Team	Pld	W	D	L	GF	GA	GD	Pts	Promotion or relegation
1	Novi Sad	34	24	7	3	64	19	+45	79	Promoted to Serbian First League
2	Proleter Novi Sad	34	16	7	11	49	32	+17	55	
3	Palić	34	16	7	11	49	37	+12	55	
4	Bačka	34	17	4	13	45	43	+2	55	
5	Zlatibor Voda	34	16	6	12	50	27	+23	54	
6	Tekstilac Ites	34	16	6	12	41	38	+3	54	
7	Sloga Temerin	34	16	4	14	45	44	+1	52	
8	Big Bull	34	14	8	12	36	35	+1	50	
9	Jedinstvo Stara Pazova	34	13	11	10	32	34	−2	50	
10	Radnički Nova Pazova	34	14	8	12	43	46	−3	50	
11	Vršac	34	13	10	11	35	37	−2	49	
12	Dinamo Pančevo	34	14	5	15	42	48	−6	47	Relegated to regional leagues
13	Radnički Sombor	34	13	6	15	37	35	+2	45	Relegated to regional leagues
14	Cement Beočin	34	13	6	15	40	44	−4	45	Relegated to regional leagues
15	Šajkaš Kovilj	34	10	6	18	34	51	−17	36	Relegated to regional leagues
16	Bečej	34	9	7	18	35	61	−26	34	Relegated to regional leagues
17	Crvenka	34	8	7	19	36	49	−13	31	Relegated to regional leagues
18	Radnik Stari Tamiš	34	4	5	25	23	56	−33	17	Relegated to regional leagues

Source: srpskaliga.co.yu
