= Padina (Kovačica) =

Padina Падина (Serbian) Padina (Slovak)
- Village (Selo)
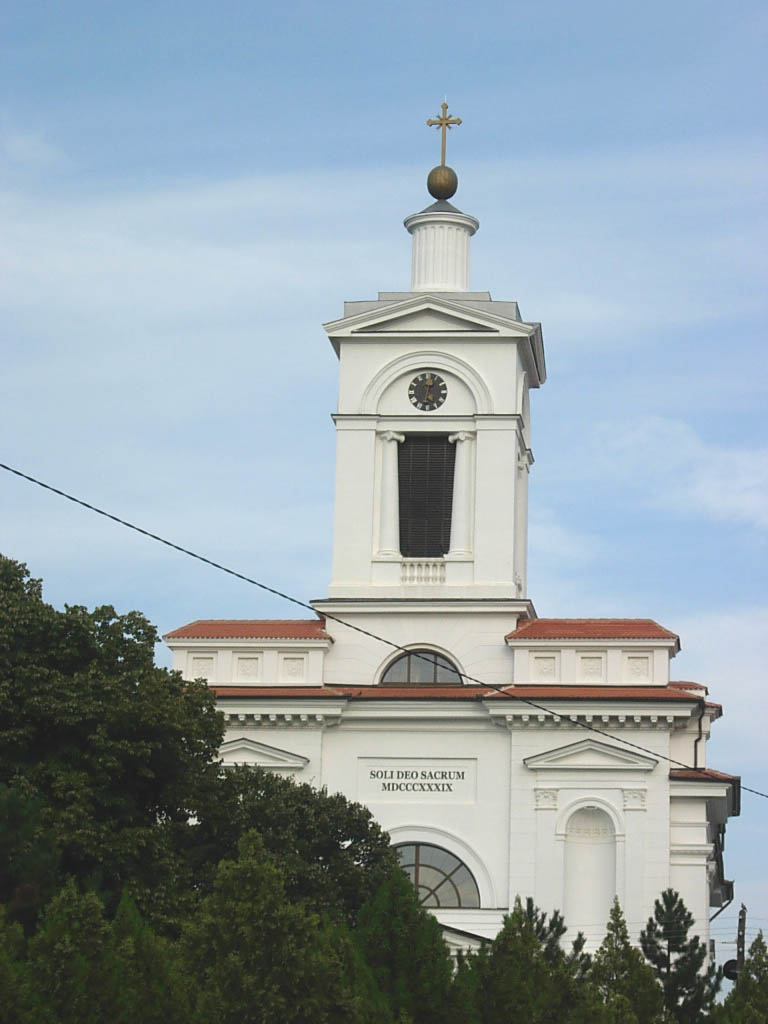
- The Slovak Evangelical church

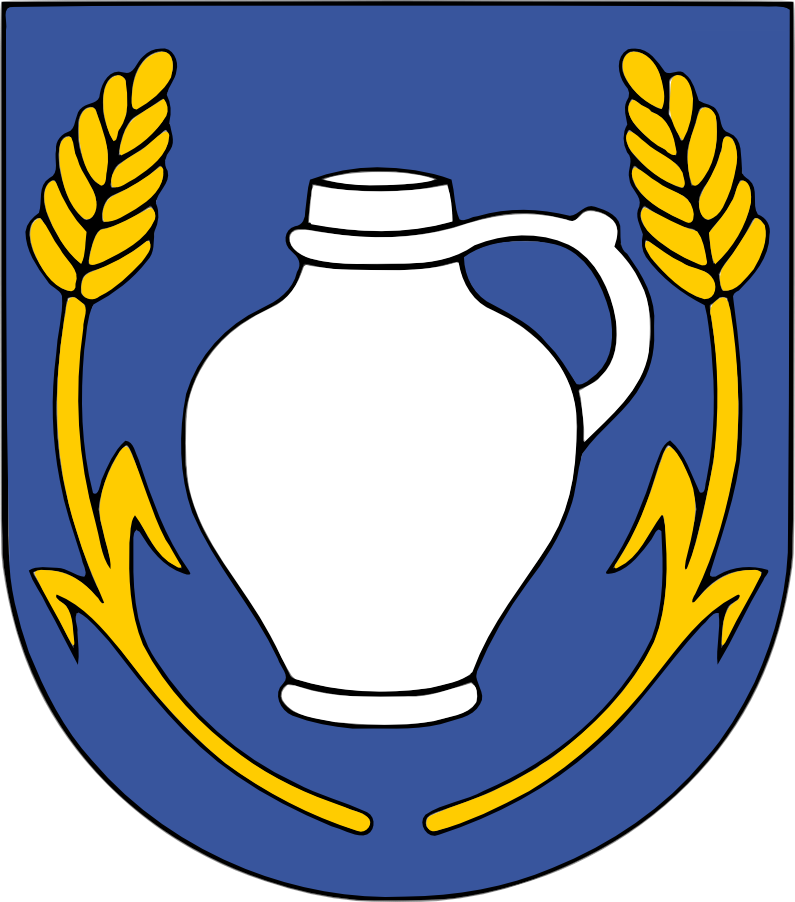
- Flag Coat of arms

- Location of Padina within Serbia Padina (Serbia) Padina (Europe)
- Coordinates: 45.12°N 20.72°E
- Country: Serbia
- Province: Vojvodina
- District: South Banat
- Municipality: Kovačica
- Elevation: 105 m (344 ft)

Population (2022)
  - Padina: 4,774
- Time zone: UTC+1 (CET)
  - Summer (DST): UTC+2 (CEST)
- Postal code: 26215
- Area code: +381(0)13
- Car plates: PA

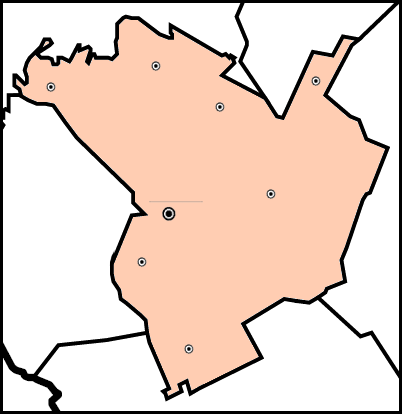

Padina (Serbian Cyrillic: Падина; Slovak: Padina) is a village in Kovačica municipality, South Banat District, Vojvodina, Serbia. The village has a population of 4,774 inhabitants (2022 census).

== Geography and climate ==
Padina lies in the middle of South Banat, at the border of Deliblato's shoal, on 52.75 km^{2} (20.37 sq mi), and in a southeast-northwest course. Geographical width of village is 45°7' N and 20°44' E. Altitude is between 105 and 120 meters above sea level (the church is on 111 m). Its name means slope or downhill. Padina covers 13% of Kovačica municipality, that is parting of the ways of roads to Belgrade, Zrenjanin, Novi Sad and Vršac.

System of valleys surrounding Padina has two directions, which cross on southern part called BAUK. Northern part is called Upper valley (Horná Dolina), and southern - Lower valley (Dolná Dolina).

Characteristic of Padina are large differences between summer and winter temperatures and low precipitation. July is the warmest month with average temperature about 22 °C (72 °F), and January is the coldest month with average about −1 °C (30 °F). Divergence between the lowest and the highest absolutely measured temperature is 70°C.

The highest precipitation is in May and June and also in November and December. It totals between 650 and 700 mm of rain per year.

The wind, which often blows from southeast is called "koshava". Košava blows from Montenegro for one to seven days (or even longer) with a speed of 100 km/h. It is most frequent in spring and autumn. Northern wind is dry, like koshava, but much colder. It comes in winter months and brings the coldest and driest weather.

Underground water is being found in depths about 30 meters. On deeper places water is more clear, and people are supplied from there. The soil in Padina is muddy.

== History ==
Padina was first settled by Romanians and later by Serbs but these settlements were razed by Ottomans and abandoned, the location of Romanian village is unknown but Serbian one was located approximately one kilometer south of present day village. The current village was founded in 1806 by Slovak settlers.

Slovaks settled in present-day Vojvodina – the autonomous province in the north of the Republic of Serbia – during a colonisation process that started in the mid-18th century. They settled in the southern parts of the Hungarian Kingdom where Padina is, known as the "Lower Land" (Slovak: Dolná zem), and they were referred to as Lowland Slovaks. Slovak migration to what is now Padina was driven by a mix of state-led colonisation, economic pressure at home, and religious factors. Most settlers came from Gemer and Malohont regions.

The settlers came from Upper Hungary (today's Slovakia), where Lutheranism was strong among Slovaks. Moving south allowed them to farm better land and practice Lutheranism with less local interference than in some northern counties

There were two waves of Slovak immigration, each containing 80 families. The second wave came six years after the foundation of the village and was mostly from outside of modern day Slovakia, majority of which came from Pest and Ungvar regions.

The settlement was initiated by Archduke Ludwig to strengthen the Military Border between Austrian and Ottoman Empires. The official name was related to the initiator – Ludwigsdorf in German or Nagylájosfalva in Hungarian (both meaning Ludwig's village). The inhabitants, however, kept calling it Padina.

In the beginning, the settlers had problem with drinkable water, as it is being found deep underground and the soil is unstable. The archduke promised them to build wells, which took until 1817 to fulfill. In 1809 there was a unrest in which aftermath near half of the families left Padina and resettled in Bela Crkva.

== Name ==
"Padina" is a Slavic word for "slope".

== Demographics ==
=== Historical population ===
- 1961: 6,197
- 1971: 6,362
- 1981: 6,367
- 1991: 6,076
- 2002: 5,760
- 2011: 5,531
- 2022: 4,774

=== Ethnic groups ===
According to data from the 2022 census, ethnic groups in the village include:

- 4,422 (92.6%) Slovaks
- 101 (2.1%) Serbs
- Others/Undeclared/Unknown

=== Religion ===
Padina was founded and settled primarily by Slovak Lutherans, members of the Evangelical Church of the Augsburg Confession.

A large Evangelical Lutheran church was built in the village in the 19th century and historically served as the central religious institution of the local Slovak population.

For much of its history, Padina was religiously homogeneous, with social life, customs, and the annual calendar shaped predominantly by Lutheran practice.

During the late 19th and especially the 20th century, Padina experienced religious diversification. Other Protestant denominations became present, including Reformed Protestants, Baptists, Pentecostal and Evangelical churches, Nazarenes and others. All of these denominations have their own churches, which are basically adapted houses.

Many of these denominations emerged through internal religious movements and conversions within the Slovak Lutheran population rather than through external migration.

== Sports ==
Local football club Dolina spent one season in Serbia's second tier, but competes on the 5th level in the 2025/26 season.

== See also ==
- List of places in Serbia
- List of cities, towns and villages in Vojvodina
