= FK Radnički Kovin =

Serbian football club

Radnički Kovin
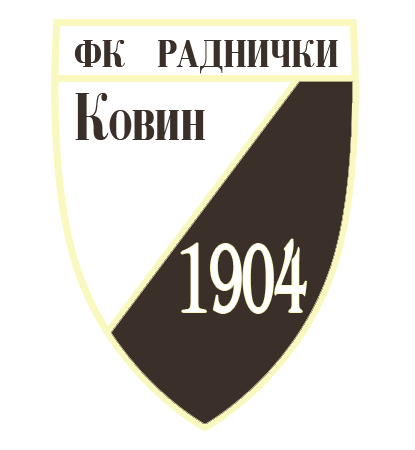
- Full name: Fudbalski Klub Radnički Kovin
- Founded: 1904; 122 years ago
- Ground: Stadion FK Radnički
- Capacity: 1,000
- President: Aleksandar Rnić
- Head coach: Dejan Babić
- League: PFL Pančevo
- 2024–25: PFL Pančevo, 3rd
Home colours	Away colours

FK Radnički Kovin (Serbian Cyrillic: ФК Раднички Ковин) is a football club based in Kovin, Vojvodina, Serbia. They compete in the PFL Pančevo, the fifth tier of the national league system.

== History ==
The club qualified for the Vojvodina League in 1975. They spent four consecutive seasons in the third tier of Yugoslav football before suffering relegation in 1979. The club returned to the Vojvodina League in 1980, but dropped back after just one season. They would spend four more consecutive seasons in the third tier from 1982 to 1986.

The club won the Vojvodina League East in the 2000–01 season and took promotion to the Serbian League Vojvodina. They spent one season in the third tier, before suffering relegation back to the fourth tier.

=== Recent league history ===
Season	Division	P	W	D	L	F	A	Pts	Pos
2020–21	4 - Vojvodina League East	32	14	1	17	63	54	43	12th
2021–22	5 - PFL Pančevo	28	19	3	6	89	33	60	1st
2022–23	4 - Vojvodina League East	30	13	6	11	56	31	45	6th
2023–24	4 - Vojvodina League East	30	4	7	19	39	80	19	15th
2024–25	5 - PFL Pančevo	30	16	6	8	69	41	54	3rd

== Honours ==
Vojvodina League East (Tier 4)

- 2000–01

PFL Pančevo (Tier 5)

- 2011–12, 2021–22

== Historical list of coaches ==
- (Serbia) Bojan Serafimović
- (Serbia) Milan Todorović
- (Serbia) Marko Pavković (2017)
- (Serbia) Milan Todorović (2017–2018)
- (Serbia) Marko Šaranović (2018–2020)
- (Serbia) Gabrijel Radojičić (2020–2021)
- (Serbia) Dragan Milošević (2021)
- (Serbia) Milorad Zečević (2021)
- (Serbia) Milan Todorović (2021–2022)
- (Serbia) Srđan Tekijaški (2022–2023)
- (Serbia) Dragan Milošević (2023)
- (Serbia) Miloš Đorđević (2023)
- (Serbia) Nikola Bokun (January 2024-Mar 24)
- (Serbia) Branko Đokić (March 2024-Jun 24)
- (Serbia) Dejan Babić (Jul 2024-)
