= Novi Kozarci =

Novi Kozarci Нови Козарци (Serbian)
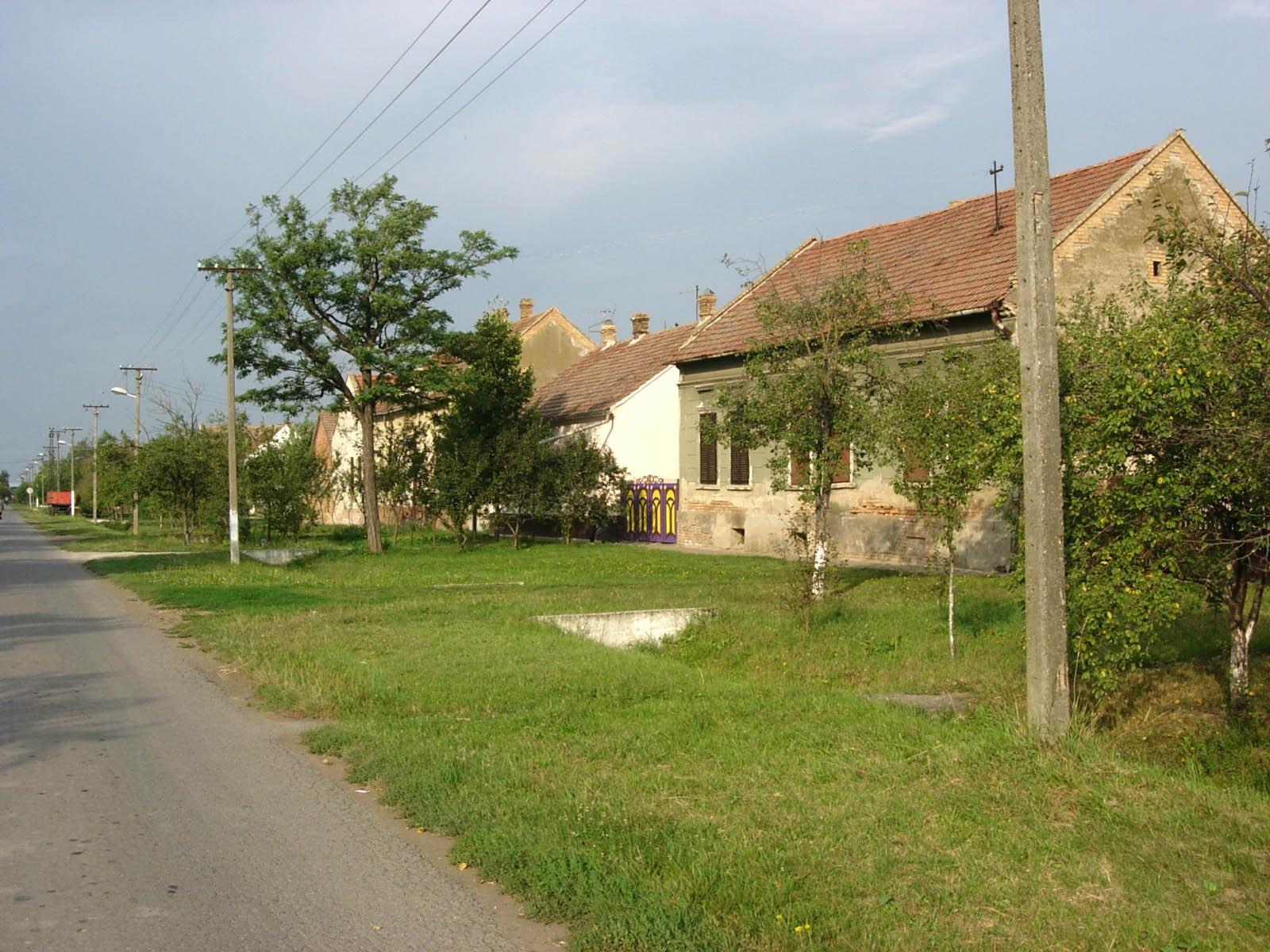
- Old houses in Novi Kozarci

- Location of Novi Kozarci within Serbia Novi Kozarci (Serbia) Novi Kozarci (Europe)
- Coordinates: 45°46′32″N 20°37′12″E
- Country: Serbia
- Province: Vojvodina
- Region: Banat
- District: North Banat
- Municipality: Kikinda
- Elevation: 69 m (226 ft)

Population (2002)
  - Novi Kozarci: 1,912
- Time zone: UTC+1 (CET)
  - Summer (DST): UTC+2 (CEST)
- Postal code: 23313
- Area code: +381(0)230
- Car plates: KI

Novi Kozarci (Serbian Cyrillic: Нови Козарци) is a village in Serbia. It is located in the Municipality of Kikinda, North Banat District, Autonomous Province of Vojvodina. The village had an ethnic Serb majority (93.19%) and a population of 1,912 as of a 2011 census.

== Name ==
The name of the village is derived from Mount Kozara in Bosnia and Herzegovina, and means 'new Kozarans'. Serbs from the Kozara region settled the village after World War II.

== Events ==
Since 2009 Novi Kozarci has been hosting Pie Fest (srb: Pitijada) every last week in September. This event consists of various competitions: making the best traditional potato pie, making the longest pie (Pie for Guinness), fast pie eating competition (srb: Pitožder) and sports competitions (srb: Novokozarački Višeboj).

== Ethnic groups (2002 census) ==
- Serbs = 2,122 (93.19%)
- Romani = 61 (2.68%)
- Yugoslavs = 28 (1.23%)
- Hungarians = 11 (0.48%)
- others.

== Historical population ==
- 1961: 3,668
- 1971: 3,068
- 1981: 2,668
- 1991: 2,488
- 2002: 2,277

== See also ==
- List of places in Serbia
- List of cities, towns and villages in Vojvodina
