= Banatsko Veliko Selo =

Banatsko Veliko Selo Банатско Велико Село (Serbian)
- Village (Selo)
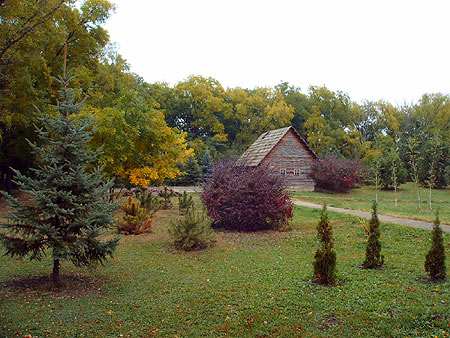
- Banatsko Veliko Selo - Memorial house

- Location of Banatsko Veliko Selo within Serbia Banatsko Veliko Selo (Serbia) Banatsko Veliko Selo (Europe)
- Coordinates: 45°49′10″N 20°36′21″E
- Country: Serbia
- Province: Vojvodina
- Region: Banat
- District: North Banat
- Municipality: Kikinda
- Elevation: 70 m (230 ft)

Population (2002)
  - Banatsko Veliko Selo: 3,034
- Time zone: UTC+1 (CET)
  - Summer (DST): UTC+2 (CEST)
- Postal code: 23312
- Area code: +381(0)230
- Car plates: KI

Banatsko Veliko Selo (Serbian Cyrillic: Банатско Велико Село) is a village located in the municipality of Kikinda, North Banat District, Serbia. It is situated in the Autonomous Province of Vojvodina. The village has a population of 3,034 (2002 census), of which the majority are Serbs (96.30%).

== Name ==
The name of the village means 'big Banat village' in Serbian. The village was formed after World War II by combining three villages. Those three villages had had a Banat Swabian ethnic majority and were named Sankt Hubert, Charleville, and Seultour in German, and Szenthubert, Károlyliget, and Szentborbála in Hungarian.

== History ==
Following Ottoman rule, there were no proper settlements in the present location of the village. Following an order by the Empress Maria Theresa of Austria on November 25, 1763, the right to settle this area was given exclusively to Roman Catholics. In 1770 and 1771, this area was settled by French settlers from the Lorraine region and by southwestern German settlers—these German settlers later became known as the Banat Swabians. They founded three villages: Sankt Hubert, Charleville, and Seultour. In the course of the late 18th century, these settlements changed hands several times. Over time, the French settlers were assimilated into the German population. After World War II, the Germans were expelled, and Serbian families from the Bosnian Krajina region settled the area. One larger village named Veliko Selo was formed out of the three German villages. In 1948, its name was changed to Banatsko Veliko Selo. Today the names of the former German villages are used as names for neighborhoods within the larger village.

== Historical population ==
- 1948: 4,388
- 1953: 4,276
- 1961: 4,310
- 1971: 3,603
- 1981: 3,332
- 1991: 3,134
- 2002: 3,034

== Gallery ==
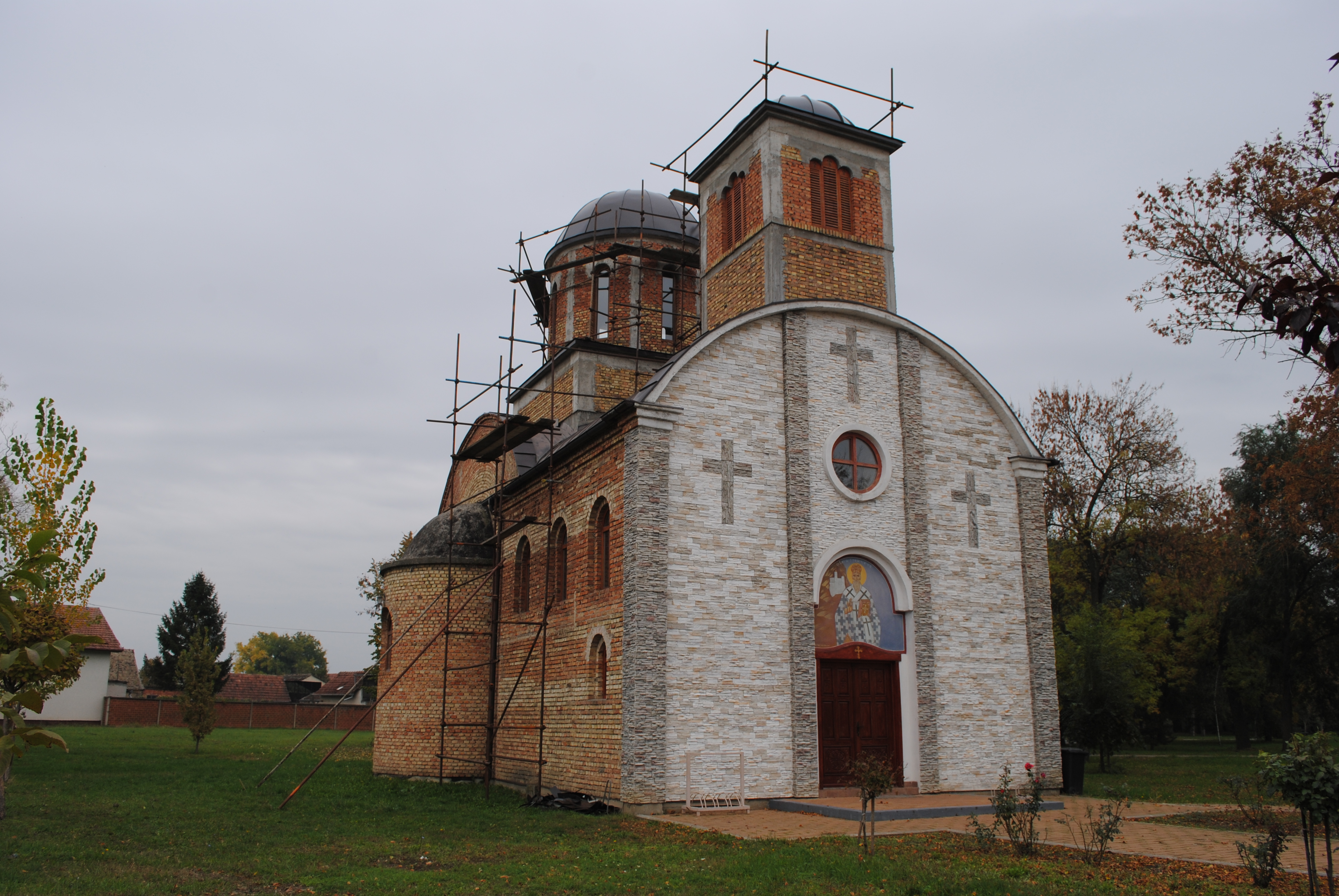
Orthodox Church of Basil of Ostrog completed in 2012

== Notable people ==
- Branimir Brstina, actor

== See also ==
- List of places in Serbia
- List of cities, towns and villages in Vojvodina
- FK Kozara Banatsko Veliko Selo
