= 1984–85 Yugoslav Second League =

Yugoslav Second League
- Season: 1984–85
- Champions: Čelik (West Division); OFK Belgrade (East Division)
- Promoted: Čelik; OFK Belgrade
- Relegated: Olimpija Ljubljana; Maribor; Radnik Bijeljina; Crvenka; Vëllaznimi Gjakova; OFK Titograd; Kolubara; Liria

The 1984–85 Yugoslav Second League season was the 39th season of the Second Federal League (Serbo-Croatian: Druga savezna liga), the second level association football competition of SFR Yugoslavia, since its establishment in 1946. The league was contested in two regional groups (West Division and East Division), with 18 clubs each.

== West Division ==
=== Teams ===
A total of eighteen teams contested the league, including twelve sides from the 1983–84 season, two clubs relegated from the 1983–84 Yugoslav First League and four sides promoted from the Inter-Republic Leagues played in the 1983–84 season. The league was contested in a double round robin format, with each club playing every other club twice, for a total of 34 rounds. Two points were awarded for wins and one point for draws.

Čelik Zenica and Olimpija Ljubljana were relegated from the 1983–84 Yugoslav First League after finishing at the bottom two places of the league table. The four clubs promoted to the second level were Crvenka, Maribor, Rudar Ljubija and RNK Split.

Locations of teams' home cities in the 1984–85 Yugoslav Second League West

Team	Location	Federal subject	Position in 1983–84
Borac Banja Luka	Banja Luka	SR Bosnia and Herzegovina	12th
Crvenka	Crvenka	(Socialist Republic of Serbia) SAP Vojvodina	—
Čelik	Zenica	SR Bosnia and Herzegovina	—
GOŠK-Jug	Dubrovnik	SR Croatia	5th
Jedinstvo Bihać	Bihać	SR Bosnia and Herzegovina	11th
Jedinstvo Brčko	Brčko	SR Bosnia and Herzegovina	7th
Kikinda	Kikinda	(Socialist Republic of Serbia) SAP Vojvodina	9th
Leotar	Trebinje	SR Bosnia and Herzegovina	6th
Maribor	Maribor	SR Slovenia	—
Novi Sad	Novi Sad	(Socialist Republic of Serbia) SAP Vojvodina	8th
Olimpija Ljubljana	Ljubljana	SR Slovenia	—
Proleter Zrenjanin	Zrenjanin	(Socialist Republic of Serbia) SAP Vojvodina	3rd
Radnik Bijeljina	Bijeljina	SR Bosnia and Herzegovina	13th
Rudar Ljubija	Prijedor	SR Bosnia and Herzegovina	—
Spartak Subotica	Subotica	(Socialist Republic of Serbia) SAP Vojvodina	2nd
RNK Split	Split	SR Croatia	—
Šibenik	Šibenik	SR Croatia	4th
Vrbas	Titov Vrbas	(Socialist Republic of Serbia) SAP Vojvodina	10th

=== League table ===
Pos	Team	Pld	W	D	L	GF	GA	GD	Pts	Promotion or relegation
1	Čelik (C, P)	34	21	4	9	52	30	+22	46	Promotion to Yugoslav First League
2	Šibenik	34	18	7	9	50	30	+20	43	
3	Spartak Subotica	34	19	4	11	51	36	+15	42	
4	Proleter Zrenjanin	34	15	8	11	49	38	+11	38	
5	Jedinstvo Brčko	34	17	4	13	57	48	+9	38	
6	RNK Split	34	16	3	15	45	36	+9	35	
7	Jedinstvo Bihać	34	15	5	14	42	36	+6	35	
8	Borac Banja Luka	34	12	11	11	40	38	+2	35	
9	GOŠK-Jug	34	14	7	13	36	41	−5	35	
10	Leotar	34	12	10	12	51	43	+8	34	
11	Novi Sad	34	13	8	13	38	39	−1	34	
12	Vrbas	34	13	7	14	39	49	−10	33	
13	Kikinda	34	12	8	14	30	35	−5	32	
14	Rudar Ljubija	34	13	5	16	37	47	−10	31	
15	Olimpija (R)	34	10	10	14	42	45	−3	30	Relegation to Inter-Republic Leagues
16	Maribor (R)	34	11	6	17	39	47	−8	28	Relegation to Inter-Republic Leagues
17	Radnik (R)	34	7	10	17	23	46	−23	24	Relegation to Inter-Republic Leagues
18	Crvenka (R)	34	7	5	22	30	67	−37	19	Relegation to Inter-Republic Leagues

Source: fsgzrenjanin.com
Rules for classification: 1) points; 2) goal difference; 3) number of goals scored.
(C) Champions; (P) Promoted; (R) Relegated

== East Division ==
=== Teams ===
A total of eighteen teams contested the league, including fourteen sides from the 1983–84 season and four sides promoted from the Inter-Republic Leagues played in the 1983–84 season. The league was contested in a double round robin format, with each club playing every other club twice, for a total of 34 rounds. Two points were awarded for wins and one point for draws.

There were no teams relegated from the 1983–84 Yugoslav First League and four clubs promoted to the second level were Bregalnica Štip, Liria, Novi Pazar and OFK Titograd.

Locations of teams' home cities in the 1984–85 Yugoslav Second League East

Team	Location	Federal subject	Position in 1983–84
Belasica	Strumica	SR Macedonia	6th
OFK Belgrade	Belgrade	SR Serbia	2nd
Bor	Bor	SR Serbia	12th
Borac Čačak	Čačak	SR Serbia	7th
Bregalnica Štip	Štip	SR Macedonia	—
Ivangrad	Ivangrad	SR Montenegro	11th
Kolubara	Lazarevac	SR Serbia	9th
Liria	Prizren	(Socialist Republic of Serbia) SAP Kosovo	—
Napredak Kruševac	Kruševac	SR Serbia	15th
Novi Pazar	Novi Pazar	SR Serbia	—
Pelister	Bitola	SR Macedonia	3rd
Rad	Belgrade	SR Serbia	13th
Radnički Pirot	Pirot	SR Serbia	14th
Sloboda Titovo Užice	Titovo Užice	SR Serbia	4th
OFK Titograd	Titograd	SR Montenegro	—
Trepča	Kosovska Mitrovica	(Socialist Republic of Serbia) SAP Kosovo	10th
Vëllaznimi Gjakova	Gjakova	(Socialist Republic of Serbia) SAP Kosovo	8th
Zemun	Zemun	SR Serbia	5th

=== League table ===
Pos	Team	Pld	W	D	L	GF	GA	GD	Pts	Promotion or relegation
1	OFK Belgrade (C, P)	34	18	8	8	53	33	+20	44	Promotion to Yugoslav First League
2	Novi Pazar	34	15	9	10	57	33	+24	39	
3	Pelister	34	14	9	11	53	35	+18	37	
4	Radnički Pirot	34	15	7	12	49	48	+1	37	
5	Rad	34	13	9	12	34	33	+1	35	
6	Zemun	34	11	12	11	44	39	+5	34	
7	Napredak Kruševac	34	15	4	15	50	46	+4	34	
8	Borac Čačak	34	11	12	11	35	36	−1	34	
9	Trepča	34	11	12	11	48	51	−3	34	
10	Ivangrad	34	13	8	13	33	36	−3	34	
11	Belasica	34	9	16	9	28	32	−4	34	
12	Bor	34	11	12	11	38	51	−13	34	
13	Sloboda Titovo Užice	34	13	7	14	37	33	+4	33	
14	Bregalnica Shtip	34	11	11	12	23	31	−8	33	
15	Vëllaznimi Gjakova (R)	34	14	5	15	35	46	−11	33	Relegation to Inter-Republic Leagues
16	OFK Titograd (R)	34	11	9	14	33	40	−7	31	Relegation to Inter-Republic Leagues
17	Kolubara (R)	34	12	7	15	33	40	−7	31	Relegation to Inter-Republic Leagues
18	Liria (R)	34	6	9	19	26	57	−31	21	Relegation to Inter-Republic Leagues

Source: fsgzrenjanin.com
Rules for classification: 1) points; 2) goal difference; 3) number of goals scored.
(C) Champions; (P) Promoted; (R) Relegated

== See also ==
- 1984–85 Yugoslav First League
- 1984–85 Yugoslav Cup
