= Milorad Sekulović =

Serbian football manager and player

Personal information
- Full name: Milorad Sekulović
- Date of birth: 10 October 1950
- Place of birth: Vrbas, PR Serbia, FPR Yugoslavia
- Date of death: 5 June 2013 (aged 62)
- Place of death: Vrbas, Serbia
- Position: Striker

Youth career
- Sutjeska Bačko Dobro Polje

Senior career*
Years	Team	Apps	(Gls)
1971–1973	Vrbas	61	(62)
1973	Vojvodina	8	(1)
1974–1980	Vrbas	165	(81)
1981	AIK Bačka Topola	13	(5)
Total		247	(149)

Managerial career
- 1988–1989: Vrbas
- 1989–1992: Hajduk Kula
- 1992: Vrbas
- 1993: OFK Kikinda
- 1996–1997: Vrbas
- 2002: Spartak Subotica
- * Club domestic league appearances and goals

Milorad "Mikan" Sekulović (Serbian Cyrillic: Милорад Микан Секуловић; 10 October 1950 – 5 June 2013) was a Serbian football manager and player.

== Playing career ==
Born in Bačko Dobro Polje, a village near Vrbas, Sekulović started out at local club Sutjeska, before joining Vrbas in the summer of 1971. He spent two seasons with them, scoring 62 goals in 61 appearances in the Vojvodina League, the third tier of Yugoslav football. After impressive displays with Vrbas, Sekulović moved to Yugoslav First League club Vojvodina in the summer of 1973. He spent just half a season there, making his debut in the top flight, before returning to Vrbas. In the spring of 1974, Sekulović netted 13 goals in 16 appearances, helping the side win promotion to the Yugoslav Second League. He was the team's top scorer over the next few seasons, helping them win the Vojvodina League on two more occasions (1976–77 and 1978–79). In the 1981 winter transfer window, Sekulović switched to fellow Second League club AIK Bačka Topola.

== Managerial career ==
After hanging up his boots, Sekulović managed numerous clubs in his homeland, most notably Vrbas (three spells) and Hajduk Kula (1989–1992).

== Death ==
On 5 June 2013, Sekulović died due to illness at the age of 62.

== Career statistics ==
Club	Season	League	
Club	Season	Apps	Goals
Vrbas	1971–72	28	21
Vrbas	1972–73	33	41
Vrbas	Total	61	62
Vojvodina	1973–74	8	1
Vrbas	1973–74	16	13
Vrbas	1974–75	32	24
Vrbas	1975–76	17	3
Vrbas	1976–77	23	19
Vrbas	1977–78	18	2
Vrbas	1978–79	31	11
Vrbas	1979–80	17	8
Vrbas	1980–81	11	1
Vrbas	Total	165	81
AIK Bačka Topola	1980–81	11	4
AIK Bačka Topola	1981–82	2	1
AIK Bačka Topola	Total	13	5
Career total		247	149
