= Dušan Drašković =

Montenegrin football manager and player

Personal information
- Full name: Dušan Drašković
- Date of birth: 20 June 1939 (age 87)
- Place of birth: Banja Luka, Kingdom of Yugoslavia
- Position: Midfielder

Senior career*
Years	Team	Apps	(Gls)
1959	Spartak Subotica	2	(0)
1960	Vojvodina	0	(0)
1962	OFK Subotica		
1963	Radnički Niš	8	(1)
1964–1967	Spartak Subotica		
1969	Vrbas	1	(0)

Managerial career
- 1970–1973: Spartak Subotica
- 1976–1977: Vrbas
- 1977–1980: Spartak Subotica
- 1980: Borac Banja Luka
- 1981–1983: Vojvodina
- 1985–1986: Vrbas
- 1987: Spartak Subotica
- 1988–1993: Ecuador
- 1994: Bragantino
- 1995: Barcelona SC
- 1995–1996: Bolivia
- 2000: Sierra Leone
- 2000–2001: Comunicaciones
- 2003: Atlético Junior
- 2004: Macará
- 2004: Emelec
- 2004: Comunicaciones
- * Club domestic league appearances and goals

Dušan Drašković (Serbian Cyrillic: Душан Драшковић; born 20 June 1939) is a Serbian former football manager and player. He is considered one of the pioneers of modern football in Ecuador.

== Playing career ==
During his playing career, Drašković spent most of his time with Spartak Subotica in the Yugoslav Second League. He also played for Radnički Niš in two Yugoslav First League seasons. Drašković retired after a stint with Vrbas in the 1969–70 season.

== Managerial career ==
After hanging up his boots, Drašković started his managerial career at Spartak Subotica. He led the club to promotion to the Yugoslav First League in 1972. Later on, Drašković served as manager of Vrbas (twice), Borac Banja Luka, and Vojvodina.

In 1988, Drašković was appointed as manager of the Ecuador national team. He led them at three Copa América tournaments, those held in 1989, 1991, and 1993. In addition, Drašković was manager of numerous clubs in Brazil (Bragantino), Colombia (Atlético Junior), Ecuador (Barcelona SC, Macará and Emelec), and Guatemala (Comunicaciones).

== Honours ==
Spartak Subotica

- Yugoslav Second League: 1971–72 (Group North)
- Vojvodina League: 1977–78
