= 1983–84 Yugoslav Second League =

Yugoslav Second League
- Season: 1983–84
- Champions: Iskra (West Division); Sutjeska (East Division)
- Promoted: Iskra; Sutjeska
- Relegated: Varteks; Sloga Doboj; AIK Bačka Topola; NK Zagreb; Slovan; Teteks; Timok; GIK Ramiz Sadiku

The 1983–84 Yugoslav Second League season was the 38th season of the Second Federal League (Serbo-Croatian: Druga savezna liga), the second level association football competition of SFR Yugoslavia, since its establishment in 1946. The league was contested in two regional groups (West Division and East Division), with 18 clubs each.

== West Division ==
=== Teams ===
A total of eighteen teams contested the league, including fourteen sides from the 1982–83 season and four sides promoted from the Inter-Republic Leagues played in the 1982–83 season. The league was contested in a double round robin format, with each club playing every other club twice, for a total of 34 rounds. Two points were awarded for wins and one point for draws.

There were no teams relegated from the 1982–83 Yugoslav First League and four clubs promoted to the second level were Sloga Doboj, Slovan Ljubljana, Šibenik and Vrbas.

Locations of teams' home cities in the 1983–84 Yugoslav Second League West

Team	Location	Federal subject	Position in 1982–83
AIK Bačka Topola	Bačka Topola	(Socialist Republic of Serbia) SAP Vojvodina	14th
Borac Banja Luka	Banja Luka	SR Bosnia and Herzegovina	11th
GOŠK-Jug	Dubrovnik	SR Croatia	6th
Iskra	Bugojno	SR Bosnia and Herzegovina	5th
Jedinstvo Bihać	Bihać	SR Bosnia and Herzegovina	2nd
Jedinstvo Brčko	Brčko	SR Bosnia and Herzegovina	3rd
Kikinda	Kikinda	(Socialist Republic of Serbia) SAP Vojvodina	8th
Leotar	Trebinje	SR Bosnia and Herzegovina	5th
Novi Sad	Novi Sad	(Socialist Republic of Serbia) SAP Vojvodina	9th
Proleter Zrenjanin	Zrenjanin	(Socialist Republic of Serbia) SAP Vojvodina	7th
Radnik Bijeljina	Bijeljina	SR Bosnia and Herzegovina	15th
Sloga Doboj	Doboj	SR Bosnia and Herzegovina	—N/a
Slovan	Ljubljana	SR Slovenia	—N/a
Spartak Subotica	Subotica	(Socialist Republic of Serbia) SAP Vojvodina	4th
Šibenik	Šibenik	SR Croatia	—N/a
Varteks	Varaždin	SR Croatia	10th
Vrbas	Titov Vrbas	(Socialist Republic of Serbia) SAP Vojvodina	—N/a
NK Zagreb	Zagreb	SR Croatia	12th

=== League table ===
Pos	Team	Pld	W	D	L	GF	GA	GD	Pts	Promotion or relegation
1	Iskra (C, P)	34	21	8	5	65	32	+33	50	Promotion to Yugoslav First League
2	Spartak Subotica	34	17	8	9	40	32	+8	42	
3	Proleter Zrenjanin	34	16	5	13	44	35	+9	37	
4	Šibenik	34	13	10	11	47	31	+16	36	
5	GOŠK-Jug	34	13	10	11	33	32	+1	36	
6	Leotar	34	14	7	13	43	38	+5	35	
7	Jedinstvo Brčko	34	14	7	13	45	41	+4	35	
8	Novi Sad	34	14	7	13	41	42	−1	35	
9	Kikinda	34	14	7	13	29	34	−5	35	
10	Vrbas	34	15	5	14	39	46	−7	35	
11	Jedinstvo Bihać	34	12	10	12	39	30	+9	34	
12	Borac Banja Luka	34	15	4	15	48	43	+5	34	
13	Radnik	34	12	10	12	48	44	+4	34	
14	Varteks (R)	34	12	10	12	40	40	0	34	Relegation to Inter-Republic Leagues
15	Sloga Doboj (R)	34	12	8	14	32	37	−5	32	Relegation to Inter-Republic Leagues
16	AIK Bačka Topola (R)	34	13	6	15	39	46	−7	32	Relegation to Inter-Republic Leagues
17	NK Zagreb (R)	34	8	6	20	38	52	−14	22	Relegation to Inter-Republic Leagues
18	Slovan (R)	34	3	8	23	21	76	−55	14	Relegation to Inter-Republic Leagues

Source: fsgzrenjanin.com
Rules for classification: 1) points; 2) goal difference; 3) number of goals scored.
(C) Champions; (P) Promoted; (R) Relegated

== East Division ==
=== Teams ===
A total of eighteen teams contested the league, including twelve sides from the 1982–83 season, two clubs relegated from the 1982–83 Yugoslav First League and four sides promoted from the Inter-Republic Leagues played in the 1982–83 season. The league was contested in a double round robin format, with each club playing every other club twice, for a total of 34 rounds. Two points were awarded for wins and one point for draws.

Galenika Zemun and OFK Belgrade were relegated from the 1982–83 Yugoslav First League after finishing at the bottom two places of the league table. The four clubs promoted to the second level were Belasica Strumica, GIK Ramiz Sadiku, Ivangrad and Kolubara Lazarevac.

Locations of teams' home cities in the 1983–84 Yugoslav Second League East

Team	Location	Federal subject	Position in 1982–83
Belasica	Strumica	SR Macedonia	—N/a
OFK Belgrade	Belgrade	SR Serbia	—N/a
Bor	Bor	SR Serbia	4th
Borac Čačak	Čačak	SR Serbia	9th
Galenika Zemun	Zemun	SR Serbia	—N/a
GIK Ramiz Sadiku	Pristina	(Socialist Republic of Serbia) SAP Kosovo	—N/a
Ivangrad	Ivangrad	SR Montenegro	—N/a
Kolubara	Lazarevac	SR Serbia	—N/a
Napredak Kruševac	Kruševac	SR Serbia	8th
Pelister	Bitola	SR Macedonia	5th
Rad	Belgrade	SR Serbia	7th
Radnički Pirot	Pirot	SR Serbia	12th
Sloboda Titovo Užice	Titovo Užice	SR Serbia	11th
Sutjeska	Nikšić	SR Montenegro	2nd
Teteks	Tetovo	SR Macedonia	3rd
Timok	Zaječar	SR Serbia	10th
Trepča	Kosovska Mitrovica	(Socialist Republic of Serbia) SAP Kosovo	6th
Vlaznimi Đakovica	Đakovica	(Socialist Republic of Serbia) SAP Kosovo	13th

=== League table ===
Pos	Team	Pld	W	D	L	GF	GA	GD	Pts	Promotion or relegation
1	Sutjeska Nikšić (C, P)	34	23	7	4	62	22	+40	53	Promotion to Yugoslav First League
2	OFK Belgrade	34	22	7	5	55	18	+37	51	
3	Pelister	34	18	6	10	61	38	+23	42	
4	Sloboda Titovo Užice	34	12	13	9	40	29	+11	37	
5	Galenika Zemun	34	12	10	12	40	37	+3	34	
6	Belasica	34	12	10	12	42	43	−1	34	
7	Borac Čačak	34	14	6	14	34	42	−8	34	
8	Vlaznimi Đakovica	34	12	9	13	33	45	−12	33	
9	Kolubara	34	14	4	16	38	39	−1	32	
10	Trepča	34	11	10	13	40	44	−4	32	
11	Ivangrad	34	12	8	14	37	43	−6	32	
12	Bor	34	11	9	14	42	48	−6	31	
13	Rad	34	10	11	13	32	38	−6	31	
14	Radnički Pirot	34	12	6	16	46	45	+1	30	
15	Napredak Kruševac	34	10	10	14	42	46	−4	30	
16	Teteks (R)	34	10	6	18	34	53	−19	26	Relegation to Inter-Republic Leagues
17	Timok (R)	34	9	8	17	31	57	−26	26	Relegation to Inter-Republic Leagues
18	GIK Ramiz Sadiku (R)	34	8	8	18	32	54	−22	24	Relegation to Inter-Republic Leagues

Source: fsgzrenjanin.com
Rules for classification: 1) points; 2) goal difference; 3) number of goals scored.
(C) Champions; (P) Promoted; (R) Relegated

== See also ==
- 1983–84 Yugoslav First League
- 1983–84 Yugoslav Cup
