= FK Vrbas =

Serbian football club

Vrbas
- Full name: Fudbalski Klub Vrbas
- Founded: 27 August 1969; 56 years ago
- Dissolved: 30 July 2007
- Ground: Stadion kraj Šlajza, Vrbas
- Capacity: 10,000
- 2006–07: Vojvodina League West, 16th of 16 (relegated)
Home colours	Away colours

FK Vrbas (Serbian Cyrillic: ФК Врбас) was a football club based in Vrbas, Vojvodina, Serbia.

== History ==
The club was founded on 27 August 1969 as a result of a merger between two local rivals, OFK Vrbas and FK Kombinat. They subsequently won the Novi Sad-Srem Zone League in their inaugural 1969–70 season, earning promotion to the Vojvodina League, the third tier of Yugoslav football. Over the next two campaigns, the club finished runners-up to Srem (1970–71) and Radnički Sombor (1971–72), before winning first place in both 1972–73 (lost in the promotion playoffs against Dinamo Pančevo) and 1973–74, eventually securing a spot in the Yugoslav Second League. They spent the following two years in the second tier, between 1974 and 1976, before being relegated back to the Vojvodina League. The club again won the Vojvodina League in 1976–77, but immediately suffered relegation from the Second League in 1978. They were promoted back to the second tier in 1979, spending two seasons in the league, before being relegated again in 1981. The club returned to the Yugoslav Second League in 1983 and stayed for four years until 1987.

Before the final breakup of Yugoslavia, the club competed in the 1991–92 Yugoslav Second League. They continued participating in the 1992–93 Second League of FR Yugoslavia, but instantly suffered relegation to the Serbian League North. Later on, the club played five consecutive seasons in the third tier, before being promoted back to the Second League in 1998. They subsequently spent the next six years in the Second League, having been relegated in the 2003–04 campaign. After two successive seasons in the Serbian League Vojvodina, the club dropped to the Vojvodina League West in 2006. Following its relegation to the fifth tier for the first time in history, the club was eventually dissolved on 30 July 2007 by its board's decision due to financial troubles. Simultaneously, it was announced that the newly formed club, OFK Vrbas, would start competing in the Vrbas-Bečej-Titel Intermunicipal League, the sixth tier of Serbian football.

== Honours ==
Vojvodina League (Tier 3)

- 1972–73, 1973–74, 1976–77, 1978–79, 1982–83

Novi Sad-Srem Zone League (Tier 4)

- 1969–70

== Notable players ==
This is a list of players who have played at full international level.

- (Austria) Goran Kartalija
- (Montenegro) Radoslav Batak
- (Socialist Federal Republic of Yugoslavia) Vojin Lazarević

For a list of all FK Vrbas players with a Wikipedia article, see Category:FK Vrbas players.

== Managerial history ==
Period	Name
1969–1971	(Socialist Federal Republic of Yugoslavia) Đorđe Bjelogrlić
1971–1975	(Socialist Federal Republic of Yugoslavia) Joakim Vislavski
1975	(Socialist Federal Republic of Yugoslavia) Vojin Lazarević
1976	(Socialist Federal Republic of Yugoslavia) Joakim Vislavski
1976–1977	(Socialist Federal Republic of Yugoslavia) Dušan Drašković
1977–1978	(Socialist Federal Republic of Yugoslavia) Radivoje Ognjanović
1978–1980	(Socialist Federal Republic of Yugoslavia) Ilija Tojagić
1980	(Socialist Federal Republic of Yugoslavia) Dragan Bojović
1981–1982	(Socialist Federal Republic of Yugoslavia) Joakim Vislavski
1982–1985	(Socialist Federal Republic of Yugoslavia) Slobodan Zečević
1985–1986	(Socialist Federal Republic of Yugoslavia) Dušan Drašković
1986	(Socialist Federal Republic of Yugoslavia) Slobodan Zečević
1987	(Socialist Federal Republic of Yugoslavia) Joakim Vislavski
1987–1988	(Socialist Federal Republic of Yugoslavia) Jovan Kovrlija
1988–1989	(Socialist Federal Republic of Yugoslavia) Milorad Sekulović

Period	Name
1989–1990	(Socialist Federal Republic of Yugoslavia) Vojin Čolaković
1990	(Socialist Federal Republic of Yugoslavia) Momčilo Raičević
1990–1991	(Socialist Federal Republic of Yugoslavia) Joakim Vislavski
1992	(Socialist Federal Republic of Yugoslavia) Radosav Perišić
1992	(Serbia and Montenegro) Milorad Sekulović
1993	(Serbia and Montenegro) Momčilo Raičević
1993–1994	(Serbia and Montenegro) Ilija Tojagić
1994	(Serbia and Montenegro) Boško Đorđević
1995	(Serbia and Montenegro) Dragan Škorić
1995–1996	(Serbia and Montenegro) Dragan Vraneš
1996	(Serbia and Montenegro) Joakim Vislavski
1996–1997	(Serbia and Montenegro) Milorad Sekulović
1997	(Serbia and Montenegro) Zoran Đurović
1998	(Serbia and Montenegro) Milovan Mitić
1998–2000	(Serbia and Montenegro) Nikola Rakojević

Period	Name
2000–2001	(Serbia and Montenegro) Milan Kovrlija
2001–2002	(Serbia and Montenegro) Željko Račić
2002	(Serbia and Montenegro) Zvonko Ivezić
2002	(Serbia and Montenegro) Zoran Golubović
2003	(Serbia and Montenegro) Milan Jocović
2003	(Serbia and Montenegro) Puniša Mehmedović
2003	(Serbia and Montenegro) Zoran Đurović
2004	(Serbia and Montenegro) Radovan Drinčić
2004	(Serbia and Montenegro) Risto Pavić
2005	(Serbia and Montenegro) Ljubiša Aleksić
2005	(Serbia and Montenegro) Zoran Vujinović
2005	(Serbia and Montenegro) Radovan Drinčić
2006	(Serbia and Montenegro) Željko Račić
2006	(Serbia) Risto Pavić
2007	(Serbia) Mićan Šumić
