= Patrice Zoungrana =

Burkinabe footballer (born 1994)

Personal information
- Date of birth: 4 December 1994 (age 31)
- Place of birth: Burkina Faso
- Position: Midfielder

Team information
- Current team: NK GOŠK-Dubrovnik 1919

Senior career*
Years	Team	Apps	(Gls)
–2013	ASFA Yennenga		
2013–2014	HNK Hajduk Split		
2013–2014	→ NK Primorac 1929 (loan)		
2014–2015	NK Neretvanac Opuzen		
2016–2019	NK Solin	71	(2)
2019	NK Rudeš	12	(0)
2020–2022	NK Hrvatski Dragovoljac	26	(0)
2022–2023	NK Junak Sinj		
2024–	NK GOŠK-Dubrovnik 1919		
- * Club domestic league appearances and goals

Patrice Zoungrana (born 4 December 1994) is a Burkinabe professional footballer who plays as a midfielder for NK GOŠK-Dubrovnik 1919.

== Early life ==
Zoungrana was born in 1994 in Burkina Faso. He captained the Burkina Faso national under-17 football team.

== Career ==
In 2013, Zoungrana signed for Croatian side HNK Hajduk Split. In 2016, he signed for Croatian side NK Solin.

== Style of play ==
Zoungrana mainly operates as a midfielder. He has received comparisons to Argentina international Lionel Messi.

== Personal life ==
Zoungrana has a brother. He has regarded France international Zinedine Zidane as his football idol.
