= OFK Mladost APA =

Serbian football club

Mladost Apatin
- Full name: Omladinski fudbalski klub Mladost APA
- Nickname: Pivari (The Beer Men)
- Founded: 1928; 98 years ago 2011; 15 years ago (refounded)
- Ground: SC Rade Svilar, Apatin
- Capacity: 2,455
- President: Aleksandar Katalinić
- League: Vojvodina League North
- 2024-25: Vojvodina League North, 11th of 16
- Website: ofkmladostapa.rs
Home colours	Away colours

OFK Mladost APA (Serbian Cyrillic: ОФК Младост АПА) is a football club based in Apatin, Vojvodina, Serbia. They compete in the Vojvodina League North, the fourth tier of the national league system.

== History ==
The original club was founded in 1928 as SK Tri zvezde. They played qualifications for the Yugoslav Football Championship in 1933, losing to Split in a two-legged playoff tie (5–4 on aggregate). The club would change its name several times during the late 1930s and early 1940s, competing as Apatinski SK, SK Apatin, and SU Apatin.

In 1951, the club became known as FK Mladost. They competed in the Vojvodina League, the third tier of Yugoslav football, in two spells between 1969 and 1972, and again from 1980 until 1988, when the competition was demoted to become the fourth tier.

After the breakup of Yugoslavia, the club earned promotion to the newly formed Serbian League Vojvodina in 1995. They spent two seasons in the third tier, finishing as champions in 1996–97 to earn promotion to the Second League of FR Yugoslavia. The club played in the second tier for four seasons until 2001, before winning first place in Group North and taking promotion to the First League of FR Yugoslavia for the first time in history. They spent one season in the elite division, finishing second from the bottom.

In 2006, the club earned promotion to the newly formed Serbian SuperLiga. They finished in sixth place in their comeback appearance in the top flight, but were forced to withdraw from the league due to financial difficulties. The club subsequently spent three seasons in the Serbian First League, before suffering relegation to the Serbian League Vojvodina in 2010. They would suffer another relegation in the following 2010–11 season.

In the summer of 2011, when the old club folded, a new club was formed and named OFK Mladost APA, starting off in the Sombor-Apatin-Kula-Odžaci Intermunicipal League, the sixth tier of Serbian football. They would immediately gain promotion to the fifth tier in 2012 and later to the fourth tier in 2014.

== Honours ==
- Second League of FR Yugoslavia (Tier 2)
  - 2000–01 (Group North)
- Serbian League Vojvodina (Tier 3)
  - 1996–97
- Sombor-Apatin-Kula-Odžaci Intermunicipal League (Tier 6)
  - 2011–12

== Recent league history ==
Season	Division	P	W	D	L	F	A	Pts	Pos
2020–21	4 - Vojvodina League North	34	18	12	4	68	38	66	3rd
2021–22	4 - Vojvodina League North	30	12	4	14	50	48	39 (Note: The club was docked one point.)	11th
2022–23	4 - Vojvodina League North	30	11	4	15	43	61	37	12th
2023–24	4 - Vojvodina League North	30	15	5	10	55	36	50	5th
2024–25	4 - Vojvodina League North	30	10	5	15	50	57	35	11th

== Notable players ==
This is a list of players who have played at full international level.

- (Bosnia and Herzegovina) Nenad Mišković
- (Montenegro) Radoslav Batak
- (Serbia) Miloš Kosanović
- (Serbia) Veseljko Trivunović
- (Serbia) Đorđe Tutorić
- (Serbia and Montenegro) Bojan Brnović
- (Serbia and Montenegro) Nenad Brnović
- (Serbia and Montenegro) Nikola Malbaša
- (Serbia and Montenegro) Boris Vasković

For a list of all FK Mladost Apatin players with a Wikipedia article, see Category:FK Mladost Apatin players.

== Historical list of coaches ==
- (Socialist Federal Republic of Yugoslavia) Joakim Vislavski
- (Serbia and Montenegro) Borče Sredojević (1995-1996)
- (Serbia and Montenegro) Dragi Bogić
- (Serbia and Montenegro) Slobodan Dogandžić (2001)
- (Serbia and Montenegro) Čedomir Đoinčević (2002)
- (Serbia and Montenegro) Željko Račić (2002)
- (Serbia and Montenegro) Dragi Bogić
- (Serbia) Petar Kurćubić (2006–2007)
- (Serbia) Aleksandar Smiljanić (2007)
- (Bosnia and Herzegovina) Milan Gutović (2007–2008)
- (Serbia) Momčilo Raičević (2008)
- (Serbia) Momčilo Raičević (2009)
- (Serbia) Nikola Vukša (2009–2010)
- (Serbia) Dušan Bugarin (2010)
- (Serbia) Ljubomir Kasalović (2010-2011)
- (Serbia) Slobodan Bačić
- (Serbia) Sreten Vilotić (2014–2016)
- (Serbia) Blaško Milojev (2016)
- (Serbia) Zoran Stamenić (Sep 2016–2018)
- (Serbia) Slobodan Bačić (May 2018–2019)
- (Serbia) Života Gavrilović (Jul 2022-Sep 2022)
- (Serbia) Dragan Rajković (2023-Oct 2024)
- (Serbia) Nemanja Žigić (Oct 2024-)
