= Goran Kartalija =

Austrian footballer

Personal information
- Full name: Goran Kartalija
- Date of birth: 17 January 1966 (age 60)
- Place of birth: Kljajićevo, SR Serbia, SFR Yugoslavia
- Height: 1.81 m (5 ft 11 in)
- Position: Defender

Youth career
- Kordun Kljajićevo

Senior career*
Years	Team	Apps	(Gls)
1985–1988	Vrbas	65	(3)
1988–1991	Vojvodina	86	(1)
1991–1992	Wiener SK	51	(7)
1993–1997	LASK	142	(3)
1997–1998	Nice	37	(0)
1998	Admira Wacker Mödling	10	(1)
1999–2002	Union Weißkirchen		
2002–2003	Union Gunskirchen		
2003–2008	Asten	90	(5)
2008–2012	St. Valentin	71	(15)
2013	Enns	4	(1)
2013	Union Hofkirchen/Traunkreis	8	(0)
Total		564	(36)

International career
1996–1997	Austria	4	(0)

Managerial career
- 2009–2011: St. Valentin (player-manager)
- 2012–2013: Enns (player-manager)
- 2013: Sportunion Hofkirchen (player-manager)
- 2014–2015: Asten
- 2015: Union Feldkirchen/Donau
- 2017–2018: Wels (youth & reserves)
- 2018–2019: Wels
- 2019–2021: SV Steyregg
- * Club domestic league appearances and goals

Goran Kartalija (Serbian Cyrillic: Горан Карталија; born 17 January 1966) is a former professional footballer who played as a defender. Born in Yugoslavia, he represented Austria internationally. He is the currently the head coach of Austrian club SV Steyregg.

== Career ==
Born in Kljajićevo, Kartalija made his senior debuts with Vrbas, spending three seasons at the club (1985–1988), before transferring to Vojvodina. He was a regular member of the team that won the 1988–89 Yugoslav First League. In the summer of 1991, Kartalija moved abroad to Austria and signed with Wiener Sport-Club. He later switched to LASK Linz in the 1993 winter transfer window, spending the following four and a half years at the club. During this period, Kartalija acquired Austrian citizenship and started representing the country. He earned four caps for the national team between 1996 and 1997. In the 1997–98 season, Kartalija played for French club Nice, before returning to Austria and joining Admira Wacker Mödling. He subsequently joined Union Weisskirchen in January 1999. After spending three and a half years at the club, Kartalija switched to Union Gunskirchen in July 2002. He later joined Asten and stayed there for five seasons (2003–2008). Afterwards, Kartalija spent three years with St. Valentin from 2008 to 2011, while also serving as player-manager in the last two seasons.

== Career statistics ==
Appearances and goals by club, season and competition
Club	Season	League	
Club	Season	Apps	Goals
Vrbas	1985–86	30	1
Vrbas	1986–87	5	0
Vrbas	1987–88	30	2
Vojvodina	1988–89	28	1
Vojvodina	1989–90	27	0
Vojvodina	1990–91	31	0
Wiener Sport-Club	1991–92	30	3
Wiener Sport-Club	1992–93	21	4
LASK Linz	1992–93	14	0
LASK Linz	1993–94	30	1
LASK Linz	1994–95	33	2
LASK Linz	1995–96	34	0
LASK Linz	1996–97	31	0
Nice	1997–98	37	0
Admira Wacker Mödling	1998–99	10	1
Union Weisskirchen	1999–2000		
Union Weisskirchen	2000–01		
Union Weisskirchen	2001–02		
Union Gunskirchen	2002–03		
Asten	2003–04		
Asten	2004–05	24	1
Asten	2005–06	20	1
Asten	2006–07	23	3
Asten	2007–08	23	0
St. Valentin	2008–09	25	9
St. Valentin	2009–10	23	2
St. Valentin	2010–11	23	4
Enns	2012–13	4	1
Sportunion Hofkirchen	2013–14	8	0
Career total		564	36

== Honours ==
Vojvodina

- Yugoslav First League: 1988–89
