= RFK Majdanpek =

Serbian football club

Majdanpek
- Full name: Rudari Fudbalski Klub Majdanpek
- Nicknames: Rudari (The Miners); Zeleno-crni (The Green-Blacks)
- Founded: 1934; 92 years ago
- Dissolved: 2020; 6 years ago
- Ground: Stadion Nikola Pasko
- Capacity: 2,500
- 2019–20: Zone League East, 13th of 16
Home colours	Away colours

RFK Majdanpek (Serbian Cyrillic: РФК Мајданпек) is a defunct football club based in Majdanpek, Serbia.

== History ==
The club made its Yugoslav Second League debut in 1977. They spent three seasons in Group East, before suffering relegation in 1980. The club played in the second tier for the second time between 1986 and 1988.

== Honours ==
Serbian League (Tier 3)

- 1976–77

Timok Zone League (Tier 4)

- 2003–04

Bor District League (Tier 5)

- 2015–16

== Notable players ==
This is a list of players who have played at full international level.

- (Serbia and Montenegro) Nenad Grozdić
- (Socialist Federal Republic of Yugoslavia) Vladan Radača
- (Socialist Federal Republic of Yugoslavia) Josip Zemko

For a list of all RFK Majdanpek players with a Wikipedia article, see Category:RFK Majdanpek players.
