= Serbian League North =

- Founded: 1962; 1992
- Folded: 1968; 1995
- Country: SFR Yugoslavia (1962–1968); FR Yugoslavia (1992–1995)
- Number of clubs: 16 (1962–1968, 1992–1993); 18 (1993–1995)
- Level on pyramid: 3
- Promotion to: Yugoslav Second League (1962–1968); Second League of FR Yugoslavia (1992–1995)
- Relegation to: North Banat League (1962–1964); Vojvodina League (1964–1968, 1992–1993); Vojvodina First League (1993–1995); Belgrade Zone League (1992–1995)
- Domestic cup(s): Yugoslav Cup (1962–1968); FR Yugoslavia Cup (1992–1995)
- Last champions: Železnik (1994–95)

Serbian League North (Serbian: Српска лига Север / Srpska liga Sever) was one of the sections of the Serbian League, serving as the third level football league in SFR Yugoslavia and FR Yugoslavia, firstly from 1962 to 1968, and secondly from 1992 to 1995. It was eventually split into two separate sections, namely the Serbian League Belgrade and the Serbian League Vojvodina.

== Seasons ==
=== 1962–1968 ===
Season	Winners	Runners-up	Third place
Yugoslavia
1962–63	FK Radnički, (Note: Promoted to the Yugoslav Second League.) Sombor	FK Tekstilac, Odžaci	FK Odred, Kikinda
1963–64	Voždovački SK, Belgrade	FK Odred, Kikinda	FK Hajduk, Kula
1964–65	FK Radnički, Sombor	FK Železnik, Belgrade	FK Zvezda, Subotica
1965–66	FK Crvenka, Crvenka	FK Sloven, Ruma	FK Dinamo, Pančevo
1966–67	FK Srem, Sremska Mitrovica	RFK Novi Sad, Novi Sad	FK Jedinstvo, Zemun
1967–68	RFK Novi Sad, Novi Sad	FK Radnički, Belgrade	FK Dinamo, Pančevo

=== 1992–1995 ===
Season	Winners	Runners-up	Third place
Serbia and Montenegro
1992–93	FK Čukarički, (Note: Promoted to the Second League of FR Yugoslavia.) Belgrade	FK Mladost, Bački Jarak	FK Srem, Sremska Mitrovica
1993–94	FK Hajduk, Belgrade	FK Zvezdara, Belgrade	FK Voždovac, Belgrade
1994–95	FK Železnik, Belgrade	FK Beograd, Belgrade	FK Zvezdara, Belgrade
