= 1986–87 Yugoslav Second League =

Yugoslav Second League
- Season: 1986–87
- Champions: Vojvodina (West Division); Rad (East Division)
- Promoted: Vojvodina; Rad
- Relegated: Vrbas; Dinamo Pančevo; Maribor; RNK Split; Sloga Doboj; Belasica; Trepča; Bokelj

The 1986–87 Yugoslav Second League season was the 41st season of the Second Federal League (Serbo-Croatian: Druga savezna liga), the second level association football competition of SFR Yugoslavia, since its establishment in 1946. The league was contested in two regional groups (West Division and East Division), with 18 clubs each.

== West Division ==
=== Teams ===
A total of eighteen teams contested the league, including thirteen sides from the 1985–86 season, one club relegated from the 1985–86 Yugoslav First League and four sides promoted from the Inter-Republic Leagues played in the 1985–86 season. The league was contested in a double round robin format, with each club playing every other club twice, for a total of 34 rounds. Two points were awarded for wins and one point for draws.

Vojvodina were relegated from the 1985–86 Yugoslav First League after finishing in the 18th place of the league table. The four clubs promoted to the second level were Sloga Doboj, Maribor, Mladost Petrinja and Dinamo Pančevo.

Locations of teams' home cities in the 1986–87 Yugoslav Second League West

Team	Location	Federal subject	Position in 1985–86
Borac Banja Luka	Banja Luka	SR Bosnia and Herzegovina	12th
Dinamo Pančevo	Pančevo	(Socialist Republic of Serbia) SAP Vojvodina	—
GOŠK-Jug	Dubrovnik	SR Croatia	11th
Famos Hrasnica	Hrasnica	SR Bosnia and Herzegovina	14th
Iskra	Bugojno	SR Bosnia and Herzegovina	2nd
Jedinstvo Brčko	Brčko	SR Bosnia and Herzegovina	5th
Kikinda	Kikinda	(Socialist Republic of Serbia) SAP Vojvodina	8th
Leotar	Trebinje	SR Bosnia and Herzegovina	3rd
Maribor	Maribor	SR Slovenia	—
Mladost Petrinja	Petrinja	SR Croatia	—
Novi Sad	Novi Sad	(Socialist Republic of Serbia) SAP Vojvodina	7th
Proleter Zrenjanin	Zrenjanin	(Socialist Republic of Serbia) SAP Vojvodina	4th
Rudar Ljubija	Prijedor	SR Bosnia and Herzegovina	6th
Sloga Doboj	Doboj	SR Bosnia and Herzegovina	—
RNK Split	Split	SR Croatia	13th
Šibenik	Šibenik	SR Croatia	9th
Vojvodina	Novi Sad	(Socialist Republic of Serbia) SAP Vojvodina	—
Vrbas	Titov Vrbas	(Socialist Republic of Serbia) SAP Vojvodina	10th

=== League table ===
Pos	Team	Pld	W	D	L	GF	GA	GD	Pts	Promotion or relegation
1	Vojvodina (C, P)	34	20	9	5	60	26	+34	49	Promotion to Yugoslav First League
2	Novi Sad	34	16	10	8	43	25	+18	42	
3	Kikinda	34	15	8	11	39	34	+5	38	
4	Leotar	34	16	5	13	51	42	+9	37	
5	GOŠK-Jug	34	14	9	11	41	34	+7	37	
6	Borac Banja Luka	34	16	4	14	45	35	+10	36	
7	Proleter Zrenjanin	34	13	10	11	40	34	+6	36	
8	Mladost Petrinja	34	15	5	14	46	36	+10	35	
9	Jedinstvo Brčko	34	15	5	14	43	39	+4	35	
10	Iskra	34	15	5	14	40	40	0	35	
11	Šibenik	34	15	4	15	54	42	+12	34	
12	Rudar Ljubija	34	14	6	14	32	40	−8	34	
13	Famos Hrasnica	34	11	11	12	39	39	0	33	
14	Vrbas (R)	34	10	11	13	46	51	−5	31	Relegation to Inter-Republic Leagues
15	Dinamo Pančevo (R)	34	12	6	16	35	44	−9	30	Relegation to Inter-Republic Leagues
16	Maribor (R)	34	11	6	17	36	59	−23	28	Relegation to Inter-Republic Leagues
17	RNK Split (R)	34	8	6	20	36	66	−30	22	Relegation to Inter-Republic Leagues
18	Sloga Doboj (R)	34	7	6	21	15	53	−38	20	Relegation to Inter-Republic Leagues

Source: fsgzrenjanin.com
Rules for classification: 1) points; 2) goal difference; 3) number of goals scored.
(C) Champions; (P) Promoted; (R) Relegated

== East Division ==
=== Teams ===
A total of eighteen teams contested the league, including thirteen sides from the 1985–86 season, one club relegated from the 1985–86 Yugoslav First League and four sides promoted from the Inter-Republic Leagues played in the 1985–86 season. The league was contested in a double round robin format, with each club playing every other club twice, for a total of 34 rounds. Two points were awarded for wins and one point for draws.

OFK Belgrade were relegated from the 1985–86 Yugoslav First League after finishing in the 17th place of the league table. The four clubs promoted to the second level were Bokelj, Majdanpek, Pobeda and Vlaznimi Đakovica.

Locations of teams' home cities in the 1986–87 Yugoslav Second League East

Team	Location	Federal subject	Position in 1985–86
Belasica	Strumica	SR Macedonia	13th
OFK Belgrade	Belgrade	SR Serbia	—
Bokelj	Kotor	SR Montenegro	—
Borac Čačak	Čačak	SR Serbia	5th
Ivangrad	Ivangrad	SR Montenegro	10th
Majdanpek	Majdanpek	SR Serbia	—
Napredak Kruševac	Kruševac	SR Serbia	11th
Novi Pazar	Novi Pazar	SR Serbia	4th
Pelister	Bitola	SR Macedonia	6th
Pobeda	Prilep	SR Macedonia	—
Rad	Belgrade	SR Serbia	2nd
Radnički Kragujevac	Kragujevac	SR Serbia	3rd
Radnički Pirot	Pirot	SR Serbia	12th
Crvena Zvezda Gnjilane	Gnjilane	(Socialist Republic of Serbia) SAP Kosovo	14th
Sloboda Titovo Užice	Titovo Užice	SR Serbia	8th
Teteks	Tetovo	SR Macedonia	7th
Trepca	Kosovska Mitrovica	(Socialist Republic of Serbia) SAP Kosovo	9th
Vlaznimi Đakovica	Đakovica	(Socialist Republic of Serbia) SAP Kosovo	—

=== League table ===
Pos	Team	Pld	W	D	L	GF	GA	GD	Pts	Promotion or relegation
1	Rad (C, P)	34	20	9	5	54	15	+39	49	Promotion to Yugoslav First League
2	OFK Belgrade	34	18	10	6	61	25	+36	46	
3	Novi Pazar	34	10	15	9	37	26	+11	35	
4	Pelister	34	14	6	14	46	47	−1	34	
5	Majdanpek	34	13	7	14	38	31	+7	33	
6	Radnički Pirot	34	12	9	13	40	37	+3	33	
7	Sloboda Titovo Užice	34	12	9	13	33	30	+3	33	
8	Teteks	34	14	5	15	44	43	+1	33	
9	Borac Čačak	34	11	11	12	35	34	+1	33	
10	Vlaznimi Đakovica	34	14	5	15	43	43	0	33	
11	Ivangrad	34	11	11	12	33	44	−11	33	
12	Radnički Kragujevac	34	14	5	15	35	47	−12	33	
13	Pobeda	34	13	7	14	28	40	−12	33	
14	Crvena Zvezda Gnjilane	34	14	5	15	31	45	−14	33	
15	Napredak Kruševac	34	11	10	13	29	39	−10	32	
16	Belasica (R)	34	10	11	13	31	47	−16	31	Relegation to Inter-Republic Leagues
17	Trepča (R)	34	10	10	14	36	44	−8	30	Relegation to Inter-Republic Leagues
18	Bokelj (R)	34	7	11	16	20	37	−17	25	Relegation to Inter-Republic Leagues

Source: fsgzrenjanin.com
Rules for classification: 1) points; 2) goal difference; 3) number of goals scored.
(C) Champions; (P) Promoted; (R) Relegated

== See also ==
- 1986–87 Yugoslav First League
- 1986–87 Yugoslav Cup
