= Vojvodina League =

Yugoslav football league division

- Founded: 1958; 1964
- Folded: 1962; 1993
- Country: FPR Yugoslavia (1958–1962); SFR Yugoslavia (1964–1992); FR Yugoslavia (1992–1993)
- Number of clubs: 12 (1958–1962); 16 (1964–1965); 18 (1965–1979); 16 (1979–1982); 18 (1982–1993)
- Level on pyramid: 3 (1958–1962, 1968–1988); 4 (1964–1968, 1988–1993)
- Promotion to: Yugoslav Second League (1958–1962, 1968–1988); Serbian League North (1964–1968, 1992–1993); Yugoslav Inter-Republic League (1988–1992)
- Relegation to: Banat League (1958–1962, 1968–1973); North Banat League (1964–1968); Zrenjanin Regional A League (1973–1983); Banat League (1983–1993)
- Domestic cup(s): Yugoslav Cup (1958–1962, 1964–1992); FR Yugoslavia Cup (1992–1993)
- Most championships: Vrbas (5 titles)

Vojvodina League (Serbian: Војвођанска лига / Vojvođanska liga) was the third level division in the Yugoslav football league system on two occasions, firstly from 1958 to 1962, and secondly from 1968 to 1988, when it was demoted to become the fourth tier of Yugoslav football. The league previously served as the fourth tier from 1964 to 1968.

== Seasons ==
=== Tier 3 ===
==== 1958–1962 ====
Season	Winners	Runners-up	Third place
Yugoslavia
1958–59	FK Radnički, Kikinda	FK Rusanda, Melenci	FK Radnik, Vrbas
1959–60	FK Dinamo, Pančevo	FK Bačka, (Note: Promoted to the Yugoslav Second League.) Bačka Palanka	FK Bratstvo-Jedinstvo, Bečej
1960–61	FK Bratstvo-Jedinstvo, Bečej	FK Železničar, Inđija	FK Proleter, Zrenjanin
1961–62	FK Odred, Kikinda	FK Bačka, Bačka Palanka	OFK Subotica, Subotica

==== 1968–1988 ====
Season	Winners	Runners-up	Third place
Yugoslavia
1968–69	FK Hajduk, Kula	FK ŽAK, Kikinda	FK Bečej, Bečej
1969–70	FK Hajduk, (Note: Promoted to the Yugoslav Second League.) Kula	FK Srem, Sremska Mitrovica	FK Sloven, Ruma
1970–71	FK Srem, Sremska Mitrovica	FK Vrbas, Vrbas	FK Sloven, Ruma
1971–72	FK Radnički, Sombor	FK Vrbas, Vrbas	FK Sloven, Ruma
1972–73	FK Vrbas, Vrbas	FK Polet, Kikinda	FK Bačka, Subotica
1973–74	FK Vrbas, Vrbas	FK Radnički, Zrenjanin	OFK Kikinda, Kikinda
1974–75	FK Spartak, Subotica	OFK Kikinda, Kikinda	FK Bačka, Subotica
1975–76	OFK Kikinda, Kikinda	FK Bačka, Subotica	FK Kozara, Banatsko Veliko Selo
1976–77	FK Vrbas, Vrbas	FK Radnički, Bajmok	FK Srem, Sremska Mitrovica
1977–78	FK Spartak, Subotica	FK AIK, Bačka Topola	FK Dinamo, Pančevo
1978–79	FK Vrbas, Vrbas	FK Crvenka, Crvenka	FK AIK, Bačka Topola
1979–80	FK AIK, Bačka Topola	FK Bačka, Bačka Palanka	FK Radnički, Bajmok
1980–81	OFK Kikinda, Kikinda	FK Novi Sad, Novi Sad	FK Srem, Sremska Mitrovica
1981–82	FK Novi Sad, Novi Sad	FK Vrbas, Vrbas	FK Mladost, Apatin
1982–83	FK Vrbas, Vrbas	FK Jedinstvo, Novi Bečej	FK Dinamo, Pančevo
1983–84	FK Crvenka, Crvenka	FK Radnički, Sombor	FK Bačka, Bačka Palanka
1984–85	FK AIK, Bačka Topola	FK Radnički, Sombor	FK Dinamo, Pančevo
1985–86	FK Dinamo, Pančevo	FK Kabel, Novi Sad	FK Crvenka, Crvenka
1986–87	FK Kabel, Novi Sad	FK AIK, Bačka Topola	FK Crvenka, Crvenka
1987–88	FK Bačka, Bačka Palanka	FK AIK, Bačka Topola	FK Vrbas, Vrbas

=== Tier 4 ===
==== 1964–1968 ====
Season	Winners	Runners-up	Third place
Yugoslavia
1964–65	FK Dinamo, (Note: Promoted to the Serbian League North.) Pančevo	ŽFK Banat, Zrenjanin	FK Radnički, Sutjeska
1965–66	FK Senta, Senta	OFK Slavija, Novi Sad	FK Vršac, Vršac
1966–67	FK Radnički, Sremska Mitrovica	FK Kombinat, Vrbas	FK BAK, Bela Crkva
1967–68	FK Senta, (Note: In the summer of 1968, the Vojvodina League was promoted to become the third tier of Yugoslav football. The top eight teams in the 1967–68 season earned a spot for the 1968–69 season.) Senta	FK Vršac, Vršac	FK Bečej, Bečej

==== 1988–1993 ====
Season	Winners	Runners-up	Third place
Yugoslavia
1988–89	FK Bečej, (Note: Promoted to the Yugoslav Inter-Republic League.) Bečej	FK Hajduk, Kula	FK Mladost, Bački Jarak
1989–90	FK Hajduk, Kula	FK Radnički, Sombor	FK Radnički, Zrenjanin
1990–91	FK Dinamo, Pančevo	FK Agrounija, Inđija	FK Srem, Sremska Mitrovica
1991–92	FK Crvenka, (Note: Promoted to the Serbian League North.) Crvenka	FK Radnički, Zrenjanin	FK Mladost, Bački Jarak
Serbia and Montenegro
1992–93	FK Bačka, Bačka Palanka	FK Bačka, Subotica	FK Cement, Beočin
