= Viktor Orsag =

Serbian footballer

Viktor Ország
Personal information
- Full name: Viktor Ország
- Date of birth: 11 April 1975 (age 51)
- Place of birth: Vrbas, SFR Yugoslavia
- Height: 1.78 m (5 ft 10 in)
- Position: Midfielder

Youth career
- AIK Bačka Topola

Senior career*
Years	Team	Apps	(Gls)
1991–1995	AIK Bačka Topola	112	(46)
1996–1997	Solunac Karađorđevo	32	(16)
1997–1998	OFK Beograd	18	(3)
1998–1999	Spartak Subotica	3	(0)
1999–2000	Hajduk Kula	1	(0)
2000	→ Kabel (loan)	16	(3)
2001–2003	→ Crvenka (loan)	58	(15)
2003	→ AIK Bačka Topola (loan)	15	(8)
2004–2005	→ Crvenka (loan)	28	(12)
2005–2006	Bačka 1901	30	(14)
- * Club domestic league appearances and goals

Viktor Orsag (Serbian Cyrillic: Виктор Орсаг, Hungarian: Ország Viktor; born 11 April 1975) is a retired Serbian footballer who played as midfielder.

== Career ==
Born in Vrbas, SR Serbia, back then still part of Yugoslavia, Orsag is Hungarian origin, after starting to play with AIK Bačka Topola, he played for several Serbian top league clubs as OFK Beograd, FK Spartak Subotica and FK Hajduk Kula.
