= Joakim Vislavski =

Yugoslav and Serbian football manager and player

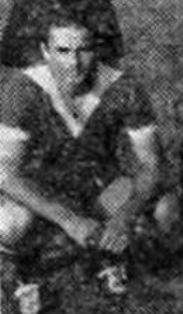
- Vislavski in 1967

Personal information
- Full name: Joakim Vislavski
- Date of birth: 26 December 1940
- Place of birth: Vrbas, Kingdom of Yugoslavia
- Date of death: 10 September 2014 (aged 73)
- Place of death: Vrbas, Serbia
- Height: 1.75 m (5 ft 9 in)
- Position: Forward

Senior career*
Years	Team	Apps	(Gls)
1956–1960	Radnik Vrbas		
1960–1967	Partizan	109	(28)
1967–1969	Olimpija Ljubljana	10	(0)
1969	Proleter Zrenjanin	3	(0)
1970–1971	Vrbas	35	(8)
Total		157	(36)

International career
1959	Yugoslavia U18	3	(0)

Managerial career
- 1971–1975: Vrbas
- 1976: Vrbas
- 1981–1982: Vrbas
- 1987: Vrbas
- 1990–1991: Vrbas
- 1996: Vrbas
- * Club domestic league appearances and goals

Joakim "Kime" Vislavski (Serbian Cyrillic: Јоаким Киме Виславски; 26 December 1940 – 10 September 2014) was a Yugoslav and Serbian football manager and player of Rusyn origin.

== Club career ==
Vislavski started playing at his hometown club Radnik Vrbas, aged 15. He later moved to Partizan, helping the side win the Yugoslav First League on four occasions (1960–61, 1961–62, 1962–63, and 1964–65). He scored 108 goals in 315 matches in all competitiions for the Belgrade powerhouse.

After leaving Partizan in 1967, Vislavski spent some time at Olimpija Ljubljana. He also briefly played for Proleter Zrenjanin, before returning to his hometown and joining newly formed club Vrbas.

== International career ==
At international level, Vislavski represented Yugoslavia at the 1959 UEFA European Under-18 Championship.

== Managerial career ==
During his managerial career, Vislavski worked at numerous clubs, including Vrbas, Mladost Apatin, Spartak Subotica, Inđija, AIK Bačka Topola, and Hajduk Kula. He died in his hometown at the age of 73.

== Honours ==
Partizan

- Yugoslav First League: 1960–61, 1961–62, 1962–63, 1964–65
