= Zoran Stamenić =

Serbian footballer (born 1977)

Personal information
- Date of birth: 3 August 1977 (age 49)
- Place of birth: Slavonski Brod, SR Croatia, SFR Yugoslavia
- Height: 1.86 m (6 ft 1 in)
- Position: Centre-back

Youth career
- FK Polet 1926
- Sloga

Senior career*
Years	Team	Apps	(Gls)
1998–2004	ČSK Čelarevo		
2004	Honvéd Budapest	8	(0)
2005	ČSK Čelarevo	29	(4)
2006–2007	Mladost Apatin	21	(1)
2008–2009	Grindavik	35	(3)
2010	Klepp	8	(2)
2011	BÍ/Bolungarvík	11	(1)
2012–2014	Mladost Apatin		
2014–2015	Bobota-Agrar		

Managerial career
- 2016-2018: Mladost APA
- * Club domestic league appearances and goals

Zoran Stamenić (Serbian Cyrillic: Зоран Стаменић; born 3 August 1977) is a Serbian former professional footballer who played as a centre-back in Serbia, Hungary, Iceland, Norway and Croatia.

== Career ==
Born in Slavonski Brod, SR Croatia, SFR Yugoslavia, Stamenić started playing with local club FK Polet 1926 before joining Sloga. He later joined Vojvodina who loaned him to ČSK Čelarevo. He went on to spend nearly a decade with ČSK Čelarevo, playing in the Serbian lower league between 1998 and 2004.

In summer 2004 Stamenić moved to Hungary and joined Honvéd Budapest playing in the Nemzeti Bajnokság I but during the winter break he returned to ČSK. During the winter break of the 2005–06 season, he moved to Mladost Apatin playing then in the Serbian First League, however at the end of the season they gained promotion to the Serbian SuperLiga. In the 2006–07 he helped Mladost Apatin to sixth place in the top tier. In January 2008 he moved to Iceland and signed with Grindavik and play in the top league Úrvalsdeild during the seasons 2008 and 2009. In 2010, he moved to Norway and played with Klepp IL in Norwegian lower leagues. He was not eligible to play however.

In 2011, he would return to Iceland and play with BÍ/Bolungarvík the 2011 season.

After finishing his playing career with NK Bobota-Agrar he became a youth coach at Mladost Apatin.
