= FK Srem =

Serbian football club

Srem
- Full name: Fudbalski Klub Srem
- Founded: 1919; 107 years ago
- Ground: Stadion Promenada, Sremska Mitrovica
- Capacity: 1,820
- 2023–24: Sremska Mitrovica City League, 1st of 11 (promoted)
Home colours	Away colours

FK Srem (Serbian Cyrillic: ФК Срем) is a football club based in Sremska Mitrovica, Vojvodina, Serbia. They most recently competed in the Sremska Mitrovica City League, the 7th tier of the national league system.

== History ==
The club was founded as Građanski in 1919. They initially competed within the Belgrade Football Subassociation. After the reorganization of the Yugoslav football league system, the club joined the Novi Sad Football Subassociation.

Following the conclusion of World War II, the club was restored and started competing as Srem in the 1946 Serbian League North. They reached the reformed Yugoslav Second League in 1958. Over the next eight seasons, the club participated in Group East, before suffering relegation in 1966. They subsequently won the Serbian League North in 1967 and took promotion back to the second tier of Yugoslav football. The club spent one season in Group East and one in Group North, before suffering relegation to the Vojvodina League in 1969.

In 1971, the club placed first in the Vojvodina League and earned promotion to the Yugoslav Second League. They, however, finished bottom of the table in the 1971–72 season and were promptly relegated back to the third tier. The club played 14 consecutive seasons in the Vojvodina League until 1986.

After the breakup of Yugoslavia in 1992, the club competed in the Serbian League North for three seasons, before being allocated to the newly formed Serbian League Vojvodina in 1995. They spent seven more consecutive seasons in the third tier of FR Yugoslavia football.

In the summer of 2002, after suffering relegation to the fourth tier, the club merged with Zvezdara, taking its spot in the Second League of FR Yugoslavia. They remained in the second tier for the next 10 seasons, before suffering relegation to the Serbian League Vojvodina in 2012.

When the club was relegated to the Vojvodina League West, it ceased to exist in the summer of 2013. Although it was drawn for the "Vojvodina West", the club did not appear for the first two rounds (as a home team against FK Vrbas and as a guest in Prigrevica, against the then PIK), the club was suspended from the competition.

After a five-year break, since the summer of 2018, FK Srem has been back in competitive football, starting from the lowest level of competition, the City Football League of Sremska Mitrovica.

=== Recent league history ===
Season	Division	P	W	D	L	F	A	Pts	Pos
2020–21	7 - Sremska Mitrovica City League	14	11	2	1	68	17	35	1st
2021–22	7 - Sremska Mitrovica City League Group B	12	10	1	1	63	18	31	1st
2022–23	7 - GFL Sremska Mitrovica	20	14	1	5	85	44	43	2nd
2023–24	7 - GFL Sremska Mitrovica	20	15	1	4	74	28	46	1st

== Supporters ==
The supporters of the club are known as the Sirmium Rangers.

== Honours ==
- Serbian League North/Vojvodina League (Tier 3)
  - 1966–67 / 1970–71

== Notable players ==
This is a list of players who have played at full international level.

- (Bosnia and Herzegovina) Đorđe Kamber
- (Honduras) Luis López
- (Lesotho) Thapelo Tale
- (Montenegro) Darko Božović
- (Montenegro) Dejan Damjanović
- (Montenegro) Filip Kasalica
- (Serbia) Igor Đurić
- (Serbia) (Serbia and Montenegro) Branislav Ivanović
- (Serbia) Milan Lukač
- (Serbia and Montenegro) Dragan Vukmir
- (Serbia and Montenegro) Saša Zorić
- (Uganda) Vincent Kayizzi
- (Uganda) Joseph Kizito
- (Uganda) Phillip Ssozi
- (Socialist Federal Republic of Yugoslavia) Miodrag Kustudić
- (Socialist Federal Republic of Yugoslavia) Dragan Mutibarić
- (Socialist Federal Republic of Yugoslavia) Dobrivoje Trivić
- (Socialist Federal Republic of Yugoslavia) Todor Veselinović

For a list of all FK Srem players with a Wikipedia article, see Category:FK Srem players.

== Historical list of coaches ==
- (Serbia and Montenegro) Milan Đuričić (2002)
- (Serbia and Montenegro) Vladeta Tomić (2002)
- (Serbia and Montenegro) Nebojša Vučićević (2002–2003)
- (Serbia and Montenegro) Milan Đuričić (2003)
- (North Macedonia) Boško Đurovski (2004)
- (Serbia and Montenegro) Dragan Stevović (2005)
- (North Macedonia) Stevica Kuzmanovski (2005)
- (Serbia and Montenegro) Milan Đuričić (2005)
- (Serbia and Montenegro) Žarko Soldo (2006)
- (Serbia) Aleksandar Stanojević (2006)
- (Serbia) Dragan Stevović (2006)
- (North Macedonia) Stevica Kuzmanovski (2007)
- (Serbia) Miroslav Vukašinović (2007)
- (Serbia) Dragan Spasić (2007)
- (Serbia) Zoran Đurđević (2008)
- (Serbia) Miloš Joksić (2008)
- (Serbia) Ratko Dostanić (2008–2009)
- (Serbia) Zoran Milinković (2009)
- (Montenegro) Slobodan Vučeković (2009)
- (Serbia) Dragan Gugleta (2009)
- (Serbia) Aleksandar Kocić (2009–2010)
- (Serbia) Boris Bunjak (2010)
- (Serbia) Miloš Joksić (2010)
- (Serbia) Dragi Bogić (2010)
- (Serbia) Nebojša Vučićević (2010)
- (Serbia) Miloš Veselinović (2011)
- (Serbia) Nenad Lalatović (2011)
- (Serbia) Vojimir Sinđić (2011)
- (Serbia) Miroslav Čavka (2011)
- (Serbia) Čeda Matić (2012)
- (Serbia) Vladimir Madžarević (2012)
