= Zoran Šaraba =

Serbian football manager (born 1971)

Personal information
- Full name: Zoran Šaraba
- Date of birth: 26 September 1971 (age 55)
- Place of birth: Trebinje, SR Bosnia and Herzegovina, SFR Yugoslavia
- Height: 1.87 m (6 ft 2 in)
- Position: Defender

Youth career
- Vojvodina

Senior career*
Years	Team	Apps	(Gls)
1990–1997	Vojvodina	76	(2)
1992–1993	→ Hajduk Kula (loan)	29	(0)
1997–1998	Budućnost Valjevo	17	(0)
1998–1999	Panelefsiniakos	28	(0)
1999–2000	Kavala	24	(0)
2000–2002	Carl Zeiss Jena	37	(3)
2002–2004	Kapfenberger SV	63	(1)
Total		274	(6)

Managerial career
- 2016–2017: Vojvodina (youth)
- 2017–2018: Brodarac (youth)
- 2018–2020: Al-Arabi (youth)
- 2020: Novi Sad 1921
- 2021: Rudar Pljevlja (asst.)
- 2022-2023: Kuwait SC (asst.)
- 2024: Leotar
- * Club domestic league appearances and goals

Zoran Šaraba (Serbian Cyrillic: Зоран Шараба; born 26 September 1971) is a Serbian football manager and former player.

== Playing career ==
Šaraba came through the youth system at Vojvodina, making his senior debut in 1990. He later played professionally in Greece, Germany, and Austria.

== Managerial career ==
After hanging up his boots, Šaraba worked as a youth coach at Vojvodina and Brodarac, before moving to Kuwait.

== Career statistics ==
Club	Season	League	
Club	Season	Apps	Goals
Vojvodina	1990–91	17	0
Vojvodina	1991–92	2	0
Vojvodina	1992–93	0	0
Vojvodina	1993–94	8	0
Vojvodina	1994–95	18	0
Vojvodina	1995–96	16	2
Vojvodina	1996–97	14	0
Vojvodina	1997–98	1	0
Vojvodina	Total	76	2
