= FK Inđija =

Inđija
- Full name: Fudbalski klub Inđija
- Nickname: Zelena armija (The Green Army)
- Founded: 1933; 93 years ago
- Ground: Inđija Stadium
- Capacity: 4,000
- Chairman: Dragan Pilipović
- Manager: Miroslav Blanuša
- 2025–26: Serbian League Vojvodina, 15th of 16 (relegated)
- Website: Official
Home colours	Away colours

Fudbalski klub Inđija (Serbian Cyrillic: Фудбалски клуб Инђија) is a football club based in the city of Inđija, Serbia. They compete in the Serbian Municipal League, the seventh tier of the national league system. FK Inđija officially announced its withdrawal from the Serbian League Vojvodina on 25 July 2026 after large amount of debts they were unable to pay.

During Yugoslavia the club mainly participated in the amateur ranks of competition.

The club's biggest success were two promotions to the Serbian SuperLiga for 2010–11 and 2019–20 seasons.

== History ==
FK Inđija was established in 1933 as a Yugoslav Railways employees club, initially named ŽAK Inđija and later FK Železničar Inđija. In 1969, Železničar was renamed to FK PIK Inđija. In 1975 the name changed, this time to FK Agrounija after the club's sponsor at that time. In 1994, the name become FK Inđija and it lasts until nowadays, exception was the period between 2001 and 2003 when for sponsorship reasons the clubs was known as FK Brazda Coop.

In 1941, they won the Novi Sad Football Subassociation First League. Later during the SFR Yugoslavia period, the club competed mostly in the third national level. On several occasions they played the qualifiers for the Yugoslav Second League, until they finally achieved promotion to it in 1992. The next notable achievement was in 2005–06 season when they reached the quarter-finals of the Serbia and Montenegro Cup, and also won the Serbian League Vojvodina and got promoted to the Serbian First League (second level).

In 2010, FK Inđija finished first in the Serbian First League and was promoted to the Serbian SuperLiga, Serbia's highest professional football league, an achievement they would repeat in 2019.

On 25 July 2026, Indjija would announce its withdrawal from the Serbian League Vojvodina due to financial problems. As a result of this, they would start over as a phoenix club, starting all over again in the Serbian Municipal League.

=== Recent league history ===
Season	Division	P	W	D	L	F	A	Pts	Pos
2020–21	1 - Serbian SuperLiga	38	10	5	23	29	66	35	17th
2021–22	2 - Serbian First League	30	17	7	6	48	29	58	1st
2022–23	2 - Serbian First League	30	10	13	7	38	30	33	7th
2023–24	2 - Serbian First League	30	15	5	10	37	25	50	3rd
2024–25	2 - Serbian First League	30	5	9	16	26	43	24	15th

== Honours ==
- Serbian First League
  - Champions (1): 2009–10
- Serbian League Vojvodina
  - Champions (1): 2005–06
- Novi Sad Football Subassociation
  - Champions (1): 1941

== Current squad ==
=== First team ===
As of 19 May 2025

Note: Flags indicate national team as defined under FIFA eligibility rules; some limited exceptions apply. Players may hold more than one non-FIFA nationality.

No.	Pos.	Nation	Player
1	GK	SRB	Vuk Karadžić
3	DF	SRB	Zoran Božić
4	MF	SRB	Nikola Nedeljković
5	DF	SRB	Miloš Radivojević
6	DF	SRB	Zoran Vlaisavljević
7	MF	SRB	Luka Galuška
8	MF	SRB	Luka Dobrijević
9	MF	SRB	Mateja Dobrijević
10	MF	SRB	Srđan Dimitrov
11	FW	SRB	Lazar Hrnjaz
12	GK	SRB	Jovan Oparnica
13	DF	SRB	Ognjen Zekić
14	MF	SRB	Nikola Ulemek
15	DF	SRB	Strahinja Ševo

No.	Pos.	Nation	Player}
16	DF	SRB	Luka Greksa
18	DF	SRB	Dušan Učur
19	DF	SRB	Andrej Dubajić
20	MF	SRB	Milan Kalinić
22	DF	SRB	Aleksandar Dimitrić
23	DF	SRB	Dejan Ješić
24	GK	SRB	Aleksa Banić
25	DF	SRB	Miloš Matić
27	FW	SRB	Luka Nikolić
28	FW	SRB	Vlada Radovanović
29	FW	SRB	Marko Malešević
29	MF	SRB	Nikola Hemun
30	DF	SRB	Viktor Zagorac
31	GK	SRB	Mihajlo Kotarac

=== Out on loan ===
Note: Flags indicate national team as defined under FIFA eligibility rules; some limited exceptions apply. Players may hold more than one non-FIFA nationality.

No.	Pos.	Nation	Player
—	DF	SRB	Ilija Čutović (at OFK Kikinda)
—	FW	SRB	Luka Dobrijević (at Zeleznicar Inđija)

== Notable players ==
Dragoljub Pejović was one of the most successful players of the club and later in his career his he played for FK Vojvodina and FK Hajduk Kula. Other players are Bojan Banjac who after playing with FK Inđija played for Lille in France, Ratko Vukčević who played for FK Obilić and Ljubiša Kekić. Altogether there have been 35 players from FK Inđija that played in top leagues, not only in Serbia but in other European leagues as well.

Players that played in the club and that have national team appearances are Bojan Neziri (Serbia), Jovan Tanasijević and Nikola Vukčević (Montenegro), Zoran Janković (Bulgaria), Yaw Antwi (Ghana), Diego Bardanca (Philippines) and Badara Badji (Senegal). Jamie Zerafa (Malta)

== Stadium ==
Stadion FK Inđija is a stadium among longest sport tradition in Srem and Vojvodina, it is located in near center of the town, near railroad station and main railroad direction Belgrade-Subotica-Budapest. It is built on a place where locomotive depot was at. For decades it is a center of main football and other sports in town.

At the time when FK Železničar was founded to today, FK Inđija, the pitch was made and with it wooden stands with a roof 600 was the capacity. Changing rooms were made in 1962. In 1970, the stands went under renovation because the wood started to fall apart. In 2006, the stadium got its today look When first built the stadium could hold up to 4,000 to 5,000 people. Over the years the capacity dropped due to safety precautions, the capacity fell to 3,500.

In 2006, FK Inđija revealed plans for a new stadium, the capacity was going to be 10,000. When finished it would fulfill the club's ambitions. The club's president has stated that FK Inđija goals were to be a standard club in the Serbian SuperLiga and to play in the UEFA Europa League. The new stadium was expected to fulfill UEFA's criteria for playing games in the UEFA Europa League, and was expected to be finished in 2012.

== Historical list of coaches ==
- (Socialist Federal Republic of Yugoslavia) Joakim Vislavski
- (Serbia and Montenegro) Žarko Soldo (2002)
- (Serbia and Montenegro) Zvonko Ivezić (2004)
- (Serbia) Bogić Bogićević (Jul 2006 – Apr 2007)
- (Serbia) Mihajlo Bošnjak (Apr – May 2007)
- (Serbia) Ljubomir Ristovski (Jul – Sep 2007)
- (Serbia) Goran Kalušević (Sep 2007 – Mar 2008)
- (Serbia) Predrag Pejović (Mar – Oct 2008)
- (Serbia) Milan Đuričić (Oct 2008 – Oct 2009)
- (Serbia) Momčilo Raičević (Oct 2009 – Oct 2010)
- (Serbia) Saša Nikolić (Oct – Dec 2010)
- (Serbia) Zoran Janković (Dec 2010 – Apr 2011)
- (Bosnia and Herzegovina) Simo Krunić (Apr 2011 – 2011)
- (Serbia) Dušan Jevrić (Jun – Nov 2011)
- (Serbia) Zoran Govedarica (Dec 2011 – Oct 2013)
- (Serbia) Predrag Pejović (Oct 2013 – Jan 2014)
- (Serbia) Miloš Veselinović (Jan 2014 – 2015)
- (Serbia) Goran Nikolić (2015 – 2016)
- (Serbia) Branislav Bajić (2016 – Sep 2016)
- (Serbia) Srđan Blagojević (Sep – Dec 2016)
- (Serbia) Spasoje Jelačić (Dec 2016 – Oct 2017)
- (Serbia) Srđan Blagojević (Oct 2017 – Oct 2019)
- (Serbia) Aleksandar Janjić (Oct 2019 – Jul 2020)
- (Serbia) Bratislav Živković (Jul – Sep 2020)
- (Serbia) Dejan Čelar (Oct 2020 – Mar 2021)
- (Serbia) Goran Milojević (26 Mar 21 – May 2021)
- (Serbia) Nebojša Jandrić (Jun 2021 – 16 Mar 2022)
- (Serbia) Milan Kuljić (Mar – May 2022)
- (Serbia) Goran Dragoljić (Jun 2022 – Jun 2023)
- (Serbia) Jovan Golić (Jun 2023 – 2024)
- (Serbia) Miroslav Blanuša (7 Oct 2024-)

For the list of former and current managers with Wikipedia article, please see: Category:FK Inđija managers.
