= Momčilo Raičević =

Serbian football manager and player

Personal information
- Date of birth: 25 November 1955 (age 70)
- Place of birth: Savino Selo, PR Serbia, FPR Yugoslavia
- Position: Defender

Team information
- Current team: Obilić Zmajevo (manager)

Senior career*
Years	Team	Apps	(Gls)
1978–1979	Vrbas	3	(0)
1980–1984	Borac Banja Luka	92	(0)
1984–1988	Vrbas	105	(3)
Total		200	(3)

Managerial career
- 1990: Vrbas
- 1993: Vrbas
- AIK Bačka Topola
- Elan Srbobran
- 2003–2004: Hajduk Kula
- Mačva Šabac
- 2006–2008: Novi Sad
- 2008: Mladost Apatin
- 2008–2009: Banat Zrenjanin
- 2009: Mladost Apatin
- 2009–2010: Inđija
- 2011–2013: Timok
- 2013: BSK Borča
- 2014–2015: Mačva Šabac
- 2016: OFK Odžaci
- 2017–2018: Sloga Erdevik
- 2018–2019: Radnički 1912
- 2019–2021: Njegoš Lovćenac
- 2022–: Obilić Zmajevo
- * Club domestic league appearances and goals

Momčilo Raičević (Serbian Cyrillic: Момчило Раичевић; born 25 November 1955) is a Serbian football manager and former player.

== Playing career ==
After having played for Vrbas, Raičević moved to Borac Banja Luka in 1980. He spent four seasons with the club, the first of which was in the Yugoslav First League. In 1984, Raičević returned to Vrbas, remaining there until 1988.

== Managerial career ==
In June 2002, Raičević clinched the Serbian League Vojvodina title with Elan Srbobran to earn promotion to the Second League of FR Yugoslavia. He also led the club in its first ever season of second-tier league football. In June 2003, Raičević was appointed as manager of First League of Serbia and Montenegro side Hajduk Kula.

In December 2008, Raičević became manager of Serbian SuperLiga club Banat Zrenjanin, but left the post in March 2009. He subsequently won the Serbian First League with Inđija, before getting dismissed in October 2010. Later on, Raičević managed several teams in the second and third divisions, including BSK Borča, Mačva Šabac (August 2014–March 2015), and OFK Odžaci (February–October 2016).

In February 2022, Raičević was appointed as manager of Serbian fifth-tier club Obilić Zmajevo.

== Honours ==
Elan Srbobran

- Serbian League Vojvodina: 2001–02

Novi Sad

- Serbian League Vojvodina: 2006–07

Inđija

- Serbian First League: 2009–10

Timok

- Serbian League East: 2011–12

OFK Odžaci

- Serbian League Vojvodina: 2015–16
