= Radoslav Batak =

Serbian footballer

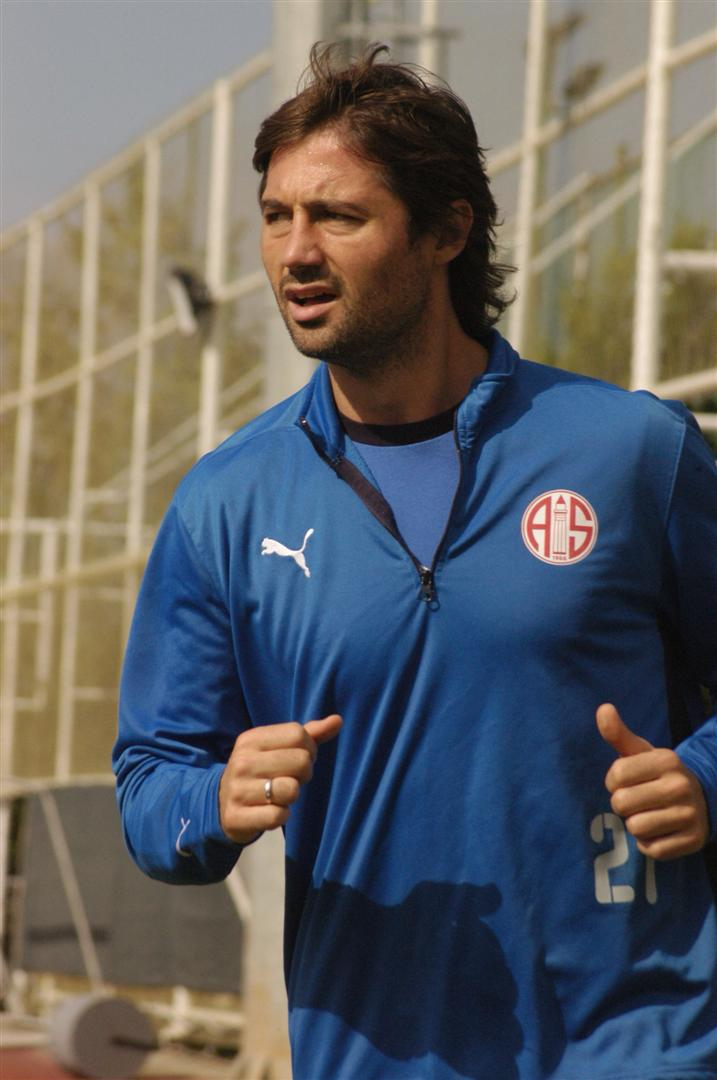
- Batak with Antalyaspor in 2008

Personal information
- Date of birth: 15 August 1977 (age 49)
- Place of birth: Novi Sad, SFR Yugoslavia
- Height: 1.87 m (6 ft 1 1/2 in)
- Position: Defender

Youth career
- Metalac Futog
- Vojvodina

Senior career*
Years	Team	Apps	(Gls)
1997–2003	Vojvodina	74	(2)
1995–1996	→ ČSK Čelarevo (loan)		
1996–1997	→ Mladost Apatin (loan)		
1998	→ Vrbas (loan)	3	(0)
2000	→ Grafičar (loan)		
2003–2005	Dynamo Moscow	62	(3)
2005–2009	Ankaraspor	84	(0)
2009–2010	Antalyaspor	14	(0)
2010–2012	Mogren	45	(6)
2012	Tobol	3	(0)
Total		285	(11)

International career
2007–2011	Montenegro	25	(1)

Managerial career
- 2015: Buriram United (assistant)
- 2016: Sisaket (assistant)
- 2017: Vojvodina
- 2018: Krabi
- 2019: Buriram United B
- 2020: Radnički Niš
- 2020–2021: Novi Pazar
- 2021–2022: Radnički Niš
- 2023: Vojvodina
- 2024–2025: Serbia U17
- 2025: Napredak Kruševac
- * Club domestic league appearances and goals

Radoslav Batak (Serbian Cyrillic: Радослав Батак; born 15 August 1977) is a professional football manager and a former player who played as a defender.

== Club career ==
Born in Novi Sad, Batak started out at Metalac Futog in 1989, before joining the youth system of Vojvodina in 1993. He was loaned to ČSK Čelarevo, Mladost Apatin and Vrbas. After moving abroad in 2003, Batak went on to play for Dynamo Moscow, Ankaraspor, Antalyaspor and Tobol.

== International career ==
Batak made his debut for Montenegro in his country's first ever competitive match on 24 March 2007, a friendly against Hungary in Podgorica and made 25 appearances, scoring one goal. His final international was an October 2011 European Championship qualification match away against Switzerland.

=== International goals ===
#	Date	Venue	Opponent	Score	Result	Competition
1	10 October 2009	Podgorica City Stadium, Podgorica	Georgia	1–0	2–1	2010 FIFA World Cup qualifying
Correct as of 7 October 2015

== Managerial career ==
In early 2015, Batak was appointed assistant manager to Alexandre Gama at Thai club Buriram United. He switched to fellow Thai club Sisaket the following year.

In April 2017, Batak was appointed manager of Vojvodina. He parted ways with the club on 30 June following a 2–1 home win over Ružomberok in the first leg of the 2017–18 UEFA Europa League first qualifying round.

After two seasons spent in Thailand, Batak returned to Serbian football on 25 February 2020, as a manager of Serbian SuperLiga club Radnički Niš. He works with another UEFA Pro licensed coach Davor Berber who joined from AFC Champions League club Tai Po.

Batak's first game was against Vojvodina, the club where he started his career, played for six years, and had managed back in 2017.

In November 2020, Batak was appointed coach of Serbian SuperLiga club Novi Pazar, alongside Davor Berber.

== Managerial statistics ==
As of 24 Decembar 2025

Team	From	To	Record							
Team	From	To	G	W	D	L	GF	GA	GD	Win %
Vojvodina	23 April 2017	29 June 2017	8	4	2	2	7	5	+2	50.00
Krabi	4 June 2018	30 November 2018	3	1	0	2	3	7	−4	33.33
Radnički Niš	25 February 2020	10 October 2020	19	10	3	6	32	28	+4	52.63
Novi Pazar	11 November 2020	24 February 2021	9	2	3	4	9	13	−4	22.22
Radnički Niš	23 September 2021	1 June 2022	29	11	12	6	34	27	+7	37.93
Vojvodina	26 February 2023	8 August 2023	17	7	4	6	24	20	+4	41.18
Serbia	13 Septembar 2024	30 June 2025	8	4	2	2	10	12	−2	50.00
Napredak Kruševac	23 Septembar 2025	December 2025	12	1	2	9	9	26	−17	8.33
Career total			105	40	28	37	128	137	−9	38.10

== Honours ==
Individual

- Serbian SuperLiga Manager of the Month: March 2023
