= 1980–81 Yugoslav Second League =

Yugoslav Second League
- Season: 1980–81
- Champions: Osijek (West Division); Teteks (East Division)
- Promoted: Osijek; Teteks
- Relegated: Maribor; Vrbas; Bosna; Radnički Pirot; Lovćen; Rabotnički; Vlaznimi Đakovica

The 1980–81 Yugoslav Second League season was the 35th season of the Second Federal League (Serbo-Croatian: Druga savezna liga), the second level association football competition of SFR Yugoslavia, since its establishment in 1946. The league was contested in two regional groups (West Division and East Division), with 16 clubs each.

== West Division ==
=== Teams ===
A total of sixteen teams contested the league, including ten sides from the 1979–80 season, two clubs relegated from the 1979–80 Yugoslav First League and four sides promoted from the Inter-Republic Leagues played in the 1979–80 season. The league was contested in a double round robin format, with each club playing every other club twice, for a total of 30 rounds. Two points were awarded for wins and one point for draws.

Čelik and Osijek were relegated from the 1978–79 Yugoslav First League after finishing at the bottom two places of the league table. The four clubs promoted to the second level were AIK Bačka Topola, GOŠK-Jug, Jedinstvo Brčko and Svoboda.

At the end of season the bribery scandal involving Maribor emerged, and caused the club to be relegated from second tier to third by the decision of the Football Association of Yugoslavia disciplinary committee. The club had a secret fund that was used for bribing officials and opponents. Some club officials were keeping track of the bribery expenses in their black book, which was later confiscated by the authorities. As a result of the decision, 13th placed Jedinstvo Bihać was allowed to stay in the league.

Šmartno, the winner of Slovenian league in the third tier, withdrew from promotion as a result of financial difficulties and corruption allegations that resulted in Maribor's expulsion. The clubs from second to fourth place also did the same which led to 14th placed GOŠK-Jug remain at the second level.

Locations of teams' home cities in the 1980–81 Yugoslav Second League West

| Team | Location | Federal subject | Position in 1979–80 |
|---|---|---|---|
| AIK Bačka Topola | Bačka Topola | (Socialist Republic of Serbia) SAP Vojvodina | —N/a |
| Bosna | Visoko | SR Bosnia and Herzegovina | 11th |
| Dinamo Vinkovci | Vinkovci | SR Croatia | 3rd |
| Čelik | Zenica | SR Bosnia and Herzegovina | —N/a |
| GOŠK-Jug | Dubrovnik | SR Croatia | —N/a |
| Iskra | Bugojno | SR Bosnia and Herzegovina | 4th |
| Jedinstvo Bihać | Bihać | SR Bosnia and Herzegovina | 8th |
| Jedinstvo Brčko | Brčko | SR Bosnia and Herzegovina | —N/a |
| Leotar | Trebinje | SR Bosnia and Herzegovina | 7th |
| Maribor | Maribor | SR Slovenia | 5th |
| Osijek | Osijek | SR Croatia | —N/a |
| Proleter Zrenjanin | Zrenjanin | (Socialist Republic of Serbia) SAP Vojvodina | 9th |
| Rudar Velenje | Velenje | SR Slovenia | 10th |
| Spartak Subotica | Subotica | (Socialist Republic of Serbia) SAP Vojvodina | 2nd |
| Svoboda | Ljubljana | SR Slovenia | —N/a |
| Vrbas | Titov Vrbas | (Socialist Republic of Serbia) SAP Vojvodina | 6th |

=== League table ===
| Pos | Team | Pld | W | D | L | GF | GA | GD | Pts | Promotion or relegation |
|---|---|---|---|---|---|---|---|---|---|---|
| 1 | Osijek (C, P) | 30 | 17 | 8 | 5 | 50 | 16 | +34 | 42 | Promotion to Yugoslav First League |
| 2 | Iskra | 30 | 16 | 4 | 10 | 40 | 29 | +11 | 36 | |
| 3 | Dinamo Vinkovci | 30 | 12 | 10 | 8 | 51 | 38 | +13 | 34 | |
| 4 | Proleter Zrenjanin | 30 | 12 | 9 | 9 | 47 | 38 | +9 | 33 | |
| 5 | Spartak Subotica | 30 | 11 | 10 | 9 | 49 | 47 | +2 | 32 | |
| 6 | Čelik | 30 | 12 | 7 | 11 | 42 | 34 | +8 | 31 | |
| 7 | Jedinstvo Brčko | 30 | 12 | 6 | 12 | 41 | 39 | +2 | 30 | |
| 8 | AIK Bačka Topola | 30 | 10 | 10 | 10 | 37 | 32 | +5 | 30 | |
| 9 | Svoboda | 30 | 9 | 12 | 9 | 32 | 27 | +5 | 30 | |
| 10 | Maribor (R) | 30 | 14 | 2 | 14 | 50 | 48 | +2 | 30 | |
| 11 | Rudar | 30 | 12 | 6 | 12 | 35 | 38 | −3 | 30 | |
| 12 | Leotar | 30 | 11 | 8 | 11 | 32 | 36 | −4 | 30 | |
| 13 | Jedinstvo Bihać | 30 | 11 | 7 | 12 | 32 | 29 | +3 | 29 | Relegation to Inter-Republic Leagues |
| 14 | GOŠK-Jug | 30 | 11 | 6 | 13 | 36 | 44 | −8 | 28 | Relegation to Inter-Republic Leagues |
| 15 | Vrbas (R) | 30 | 6 | 8 | 16 | 25 | 49 | −24 | 20 | Relegation to Inter-Republic Leagues |
| 16 | Bosna (R) | 30 | 6 | 3 | 21 | 20 | 75 | −55 | 15 | Relegation to Inter-Republic Leagues |

Source: nkmaribor.com
Rules for classification: 1) points; 2) goal difference; 3) number of goals scored.
(C) Champions; (P) Promoted; (R) Relegated

== East Division ==
=== Teams ===
A total of sixteen teams contested the league, including twelve sides from the 1978–79 season and four sides promoted from the Inter-Republic Leagues played in the 1979–80 season. The league was contested in a double round robin format, with each club playing every other club twice, for a total of 30 rounds. Two points were awarded for wins and one point for draws.

There were no teams relegated from the 1979–80 Yugoslav First League and the four clubs promoted to the second level were Lovćen, Rabotnički, Sloboda Titovo Užice and Vlaznimi Đakovica.

Due to disturbances in the territory of Socialist Autonomous Province of Kosovo, in the second part of the season Prishtina, Trepča and Vlaznimi Đakovica played their matches outside of the region. This resulted in a great number of postponed games at the end of the season. In the final round, Galenika Zemun played away against Teteks in a match that would have brought them promotion in case of victory due to better goal difference. The game ended as a goalless draw and Teteks won the promotion.

Locations of teams' home cities in the 1980–81 Yugoslav Second League East

| Team | Location | Federal subject | Position in 1979–80 |
|---|---|---|---|
| Bor | Bor | SR Serbia | 3rd |
| Borac Čačak | Čačak | SR Serbia | 7th |
| Dubočica | Leskovac | SR Serbia | 11th |
| Galenika Zemun | Zemun | SR Serbia | 4th |
| Lovćen | Cetinje | SR Montenegro | —N/a |
| Prishtina | Pristina | (Socialist Republic of Serbia) SAP Kosovo | 6th |
| Rabotnički | Skopje | SR Macedonia | —N/a |
| Rad | Belgrade | SR Serbia | 9th |
| Radnički Kragujevac | Kragujevac | SR Serbia | 2nd |
| Radnički Pirot | Pirot | SR Serbia | 12th |
| Sloboda Titovo Užice | Titovo Užice | SR Serbia | —N/a |
| Sutjeska | Nikšić | SR Montenegro | 10th |
| Teteks | Tetovo | SR Macedonia | 8th |
| OFK Titograd | Titograd | SR Montenegro | 13th |
| Trepča | Kosovska Mitrovica | (Socialist Republic of Serbia) SAP Kosovo | 5th |
| Vlaznimi Đakovica | Đakovica | (Socialist Republic of Serbia) SAP Kosovo | —N/a |

=== League table ===
| Pos | Team | Pld | W | D | L | GF | GA | GD | Pts | Promotion or relegation |
|---|---|---|---|---|---|---|---|---|---|---|
| 1 | Teteks (C, P) | 30 | 15 | 7 | 8 | 30 | 18 | +12 | 37 | Promotion to Yugoslav First League |
| 2 | Galenika Zemun | 30 | 13 | 9 | 8 | 38 | 24 | +14 | 35 | |
| 3 | Rad | 30 | 12 | 9 | 9 | 27 | 21 | +6 | 33 | |
| 4 | Sutjeska Nikšić | 30 | 11 | 11 | 8 | 27 | 24 | +3 | 33 | |
| 5 | Radnički Kragujevac | 30 | 10 | 11 | 9 | 41 | 29 | +12 | 31 | |
| 6 | Borac Čačak | 30 | 11 | 9 | 10 | 39 | 35 | +4 | 31 | |
| 7 | Trepča | 30 | 13 | 4 | 13 | 43 | 35 | +8 | 30 | |
| 8 | Prishtina | 30 | 9 | 12 | 9 | 27 | 22 | +5 | 30 | |
| 9 | Sloboda Titovo Užice | 30 | 11 | 8 | 11 | 33 | 32 | +1 | 30 | |
| 10 | Bor | 30 | 11 | 8 | 11 | 33 | 34 | −1 | 30 | |
| 11 | Dubočica | 30 | 11 | 8 | 11 | 29 | 32 | −3 | 30 | |
| 12 | OFK Titograd | 30 | 12 | 6 | 12 | 36 | 54 | −18 | 30 | |
| 13 | Radnički Pirot (R) | 30 | 11 | 7 | 12 | 45 | 36 | +9 | 29 | Relegation to Inter-Republic Leagues |
| 14 | Lovćen (R) | 30 | 10 | 8 | 12 | 28 | 32 | −4 | 28 | Relegation to Inter-Republic Leagues |
| 15 | Rabotnički (R) | 30 | 11 | 6 | 13 | 31 | 43 | −12 | 28 | Relegation to Inter-Republic Leagues |
| 16 | Vlaznimi Đakovica (R) | 30 | 4 | 7 | 19 | 28 | 64 | −36 | 15 | Relegation to Inter-Republic Leagues |

Source: fsgzrenjanin.com
Rules for classification: 1) points; 2) goal difference; 3) number of goals scored.
(C) Champions; (P) Promoted; (R) Relegated

== See also ==
- 1980–81 Yugoslav First League
- 1980–81 Yugoslav Cup
