= FK Crvenka =

Serbian football club

Crvenka
- Full name: Fudbalski Klub Crvenka
- Founded: 1919; 107 years ago
- Ground: Stadion Milorad Džomba, Crvenka
- Capacity: 9,000
- President: Miloš Puača
- Head coach: Miroslav Vasić
- League: PFL Sombor
- 2024–25: PFL Sombor, 13th of 16
Home colours	Away colours

FK Crvenka (Serbian Cyrillic: ФК Црвенка) is a football club based in Crvenka, Vojvodina, Serbia. They compete in the PFL Sombor, the fifth tier of the national league system.

== History ==
The club was founded as Crvenački sportski klub in 1919. They would change their name to FK Spartakus after World War II. In 1962, the club merged with local rivals FK Jedinstvo to become FK Crvenka. They qualified for the Serbian League North, the third tier of Yugoslav football, in 1963.

The club won the Serbian League North in the 1965–66 season to qualify for the Yugoslav Second League. They competed in Group North and ended as runners-up on two consecutive occasions, eventually winning promotion to the Yugoslav First League in 1970. In its debut appearance in the top tier, the club finished bottom of the table and suffered relegation back to the Second League.

=== Recent league history ===
Season	Division	P	W	D	L	F	A	Pts	Pos
2020–21	4 - Vojvodina League North	34	13	3	18	46	73	42	14th
2021–22	5 - PFL Sombor	30	12	4	14	70	66	40	10th
2022–23	5 - PFL Sombor	30	19	4	7	65	29	61	3rd
2023–24	5 - PFL Sombor	30	11	5	14	61	71	38	8th
2024–25	5 - PFL Sombor	30	10	5	15	60	70	35	13th

== Honours ==
Serbian League North / Vojvodina League (Tier 3)

- 1965–66 / 1983–84

Vojvodina League (Tier 4)

- 1991–92

== Notable players ==
This is a list of players who have played at full international level.

- (Socialist Federal Republic of Yugoslavia) Ratko Svilar
- (Australia) Milan Ivanović
- (Canada) Tibor Gemeri
- (Dominican Republic) Edward Acevedo

For a list of all FK Crvenka players with a Wikipedia article, see Category:FK Crvenka players.
