= Vojvodina League North =

- Founded: 2014
- Country: Serbia
- Number of clubs: 16
- Level on pyramid: 4
- Promotion to: Serbian League Vojvodina
- Relegation to: PFL Sombor; PFL Subotica
- Domestic cup(s): Serbian Cup; Vojvodina Cup
- Current champions: OFK Bačka (2024–25)

The Vojvodina League North (Serbian: Vojvođanska liga "Sever") is the fourth tier of the Serbian football league system in the North Bačka District and West Bačka District. It is one of three leagues at this level in Vojvodina, along with the Vojvodina League East and the Vojvodina League South. The league is operated by the Football Association of Vojvodina.

Vojvodina League North consists of 16 clubs who play each other in a double round-robin league, with each club playing the other club home and away. At the end of the season the top club was promoted to Serbian League Vojvodina.

== Champions history ==
Seasons	Nb. Clubs.	Champions	Points	Runners up	Points
Bačka Zone League
2014–15	16	TSC, Bačka Topola	75	OFK Odžaci, Odžaci	70
2015–16	16	Bratstvo 1946, Prigrevica	77	Sloga, Čonoplja	67
Vojvodina League North
2016–17	16	OFK Bečej 1918, Bečej	80	Sloga, Čonoplja	76
2017–18	15	Srbobran, Srbobran	70	Mladost, Bački Petrovac	53
2018–19	16	Radnički 1912, Sombor	81	Sloga, Čonoplja	60
2019–20	16	Sloga, Čonoplja	46	OFK Stari Grad, Bačka Palanka	34
2020–21	18	Tekstilac, Odžaci	84	Bajša, Bajša	74
2021–22	16	Stanišić, Stanišić	66	Bačka 1901, Subotica	57
2022–23	16	Bratstvo 2019, Prigrevica	77	OFK Vrbas, Vrbas	57
2023-24	16	Sloga, Čonoplja	67	OFK Vrbas, Vrbas	62
2024-25	16	OFK Bačka, Bačka Palanka	78	Tisa, Adorjan	71

== See also ==
- Serbian SuperLiga
- Serbian First League
- Serbian League
- Serbian Zone League
