= NK GOŠK-Dubrovnik 1919 =

Croatian football club

GOŠK-Dubrovnik 1919
- Full name: NK GOŠK-Dubrovnik 1919
- Nickname: Gospari (Gentlemen)
- Founded: 8 August 2016; 10 years ago
- Ground: Gradski stadion Lapad
- Capacity: 3,000
- Chairman: Pero Vićan
- Manager: Vedran Madžar
- League: Treća NL – South
- 2022-23: 12th
Home colours	Away colours

NK GOŠK-Dubrovnik 1919 is a professional football club based in the city of Dubrovnik, Croatia. Its name comes from the Gruž neighbourhood of the city (Gruški Omladinski Športski Klub, in English Gruž Youth Sports Club).

== History ==
GOŠK was founded in 2016 by the merging of NK GOŠK and HNK Dubrovnik 1919. The club has spent all of its time in the 3.HNL/NL – Jug

=== GOŠK-Jug ===
In the 1979, the two former rivals GOŠK and NK Jug were merged. The name of the new club was GOŠK-Jug and it continued under that name until Croatia broke away from Yugoslavia. GOŠK-Jug spent the entire 1980s in the Yugoslav Second League. Together with Šibenik and RNK Split, the club frequently came close to promotion to the Yugoslav First League. This period is regarded as the club's strongest period in its history.

=== HNK Dubrovnik ===
After the breakup of Yugoslavia the club once again merged with a local side, this time HNK Dubrovnik. The new institution competed in the first 1. HNL since Croatian independence. The year was a very strange one with the war still raging on. The club were unable to play their home games in Dubrovnik due to security threats, so played at a whole range of locations, including a famous match played at Korčula. It was very tough for the club to be competitive in these circumstances and lost their first nine games in the league. Luka Bonačić took over as manager and had many draws, many of them 0–0, with an ultra defensive style and doing so managed to lift the club of the bottom of the table and keep them in the first division.

The club managed to stay in the first division of Croatia for four years, but after relegation the club began to sink slowly into the mediocrity of the lower Croatian divisions.

=== GOŠK ===
Pero Vićan founded a new club in 1998 under the old name GOŠK. The old club disappeared due to financial difficulty while the new GOŠK continued to rise through the ranks. The new club reached the second division of Croatian football in 2000 and remained there until 2005. GOŠK finished second last in the 2. HNL season which meant they needed to play relegation play-offs – the first of which was against big rivals NK Konavljanin who they beat and then next against NK Karlovac to whom they lost.

GOŠK then dominated the 3. HNL, winning the league by 10 points and earning themselves a promotion playoff place. Their home ground in Dubrovnik was deemed unsuitable for the match so they played in Imotski, 150 km away from their home ground. NK Moslavina prevailed on away goals despite GOŠK winning the second leg 2–1, as they lost the first 1–0.

The next season, GOŠK let go a large number of players who brought them success the previous season. Despite scoring just one away goal all season and not earning a single point away from home, GOŠK maintained their third division status. In the following years GOŠK did just enough to stay up in the 3. HNL each year, forcing very young players into the first team to save on wages and because the club lacked the facilities to be granted a second division licence.

In the 2012–13 season, GOŠK did very will in the Croatian Cup reaching the quarter-finals where they lost to Lokomotiva Zagreb. In the first game played on Lapad, Lokomotiva won 1–0 while in the second leg at the Maksimir the game finished 0–0. Previously GOŠK the qualifying round passed without a fight Jedinstvo Omladinac from Nedešćina which was withdrawn from the competition, in the 1/16 finals GOŠK after the shootout was better than the second division Šibenik to the 1/8 finals after extra time was better than Nedelišće. On the quarterfinal draw GOŠK was given the first league side Lokomotiva Zagreb, which proved to be too strong rival, and after two games last remains uncertain, but this is the biggest success GOŠK in its recent history.

In the 2014–15 season, GOŠK was relegated from the 3. HNL, after finishing last. In the 2015–16 season, GOŠK competed in the fourth tier of football in Croatia, the 1. ŽNL Dubrovnik – Neretva. In that year, GOŠK was merged with HNK Dubrovnik 1919 and the club name was changed to NK GOŠK-Dubrovnik 1919.

The 2017–16 season saw GOŠK finish eighth in the 3. HNL.

== Honours ==
- (Croatia) Treća HNL – South
  - Winners (2): 2000–01, 2005–06
- (Croatia) County Cup
  - Winners: 2011–12

== Players ==
=== Current squad ===
As of 23 April 2023

Note: Flags indicate national team as defined under FIFA eligibility rules; some limited exceptions apply. Players may hold more than one non-FIFA nationality.

No.	Pos.	Nation	Player
1	GK	CRO	Dalibor Kristić
2	DF	CRO	Antonio Mrković
4		CRO	Maro Đivić
5		CRO	Hrvoje Šijaković
6		CRO	Ivan Oberan
7		CRO	Petar Krešimir Kačić
8	DF	CRO	Maro Matić
10		CRO	Marin Krešić
11	FW	CRO	Luka Matić
12	GK	CRO	Mateo Čerjan
12	GK	CRO	Josip Jurjević

No.	Pos.	Nation	Player
13		CRO	Maro Vatović
14		CRO	Maro Letunić
15		CRO	Vlaho Capurso
16		CRO	Mihael Dabo
17		CRO	Vlaho Prebisalić
18		CRO	Filip Obradović
19	DF	CRO	Marko Farić
20		CRO	Antonio Delevski
21		CRO	Stjepo Delija
22		CRO	Baldo Teo Krešić

=== Notable players ===
- (Croatia) Zoran Mamić

== Seasons ==
=== Yugoslavia (1979–1991) ===
Season	League									Cup
Season	Division	P	W	D	L	F	A	Pts	Pos	Cup
1979–80	3. Div	30	15	7	8	43	20	37	2nd ↑	
1980–81	2. Div	30	11	6	13	36	44	28	14th	
1981–82	2. Div	29	10	7	12	27	35	27	11th	
1982–83	2. Div	34	13	10	11	45	37	36	6th	
1983–84	2. Div	34	13	10	11	33	32	36	5th	QF
1984–85	2. Div	34	14	7	13	36	41	35	9th	
1985–86	2. Div	34	12	8	14	31	35	32	11th	
1986–87	2. Div	34	14	9	11	41	34	37	5th	
1987–88	2. Div	34	17	10	7	45	33	44	2nd	
1988–89	2. Div	38	12	10(7)	16	36	39	31	16th	
1989–90	2. Div	38	15	9(6)	14	39	39	36	10th	
1990–91	2. Div	36	14	6(3)	16	31	41	31	16th	

=== Croatia (1998–present) ===
Season	League									Cup
Season	Division	P	W	D	L	F	A	Pts	Pos	Cup
1998–99	1. ŽNL D-N								1st ↑	
1999–2000	3. HNL South	29	16	8	5	44	20	56	3rd	
2000–01	3. HNL South	28	18	7	3	57	23	61	1st ↑	
2001–02	2. HNL South	30	11	8	11	26	37	41	9th	
2002–03	2. HNL South	32	12	6	14	36	40	42	7th	
2003–04	2. HNL South	32	9	10	13	33	48	37	11th	
2004–05	2. HNL South	32	9	7	16	30	50	34	11th ↓	PR
2005–06	3. HNL South	34	20	10	4	54	26	70	1st	
2006–07	3. HNL South	34	14	3	17	36	56	45	13th	
2007–08	3. HNL South	34	13	2	19	43	57	41	13th	
2008–09	3. HNL South	34	15	7	12	38	42	52	6th	
2009–10	3. HNL South	32	10	4	18	33	66	34	16th	
2010–11	3. HNL South	34	11	6	17	32	50	39	16th	
2011–12	3. HNL South	34	15	5	14	40	39	50	5th	
2012–13	3. HNL South	30	15	3	12	36	32	48	3rd	QF
2013–14	3. HNL South	34	10	9	15	31	42	39	16th	
2014–15	3. HNL South	34	9	6	19	32	50	33	18th ↓	R2
2015–16	1. ŽNL D-N	22	17	3	2	45	7	54	1st ↑	
2016–17	3. HNL South	34	13	7	14	40	43	46	7th	R1
2017–18	3. HNL South	30	9	9	12	34	41	36	10th	R1
2018–19	3. HNL South	30	12	8	10	42	34	44	6th	R1
2019–20	3. HNL South	18	8	5	5	24	23	29	5th	
2020–21	3. HNL South	32	12	6	14	45	47	42	12th	R2
