= 1979–80 Yugoslav Second League =

Yugoslav Second League
- Season: 1979–80
- Champions: NK Zagreb (West Division); OFK Belgrade (East Division)
- Promoted: NK Zagreb; OFK Belgrade
- Relegated: Kikinda; Novi Sad; Istra Pula; Famos Hrasnica; Rudar Trbovlje; Pobeda; Majdanpek; Šumadija Aranđelovac

The 1979–80 Yugoslav Second League season was the 34th season of the Second Federal League (Serbo-Croatian: Druga savezna liga), the second level association football competition of SFR Yugoslavia, since its establishment in 1946. The league was contested in two regional groups (West Division and East Division), with 16 clubs each.

== West Division ==
=== Teams ===
A total of sixteen teams contested the league, including eleven sides from the 1978–79 season, one club relegated from the 1978–79 Yugoslav First League and four sides promoted from the Inter-Republic Leagues played in the 1978–79 season. The league was contested in a double round robin format, with each club playing every other club twice, for a total of 30 rounds. Two points were awarded for wins and one point for draws.

NK Zagreb were relegated from the 1978–79 Yugoslav First League after finishing the season in 17th place of the league table. The four clubs promoted to the second level were Istra Pula, Jedinstvo Bihać, Rudar Trbovlje and Vrbas.

Locations of teams' home cities in the 1979–80 Yugoslav Second League West

Team	Location	Federal subject	Position in 1978–79
Bosna	Visoko	SR Bosnia and Herzegovina	6th
Dinamo Vinkovci	Vinkovci	SR Croatia	4th
Famos Hrasnica	Hrasnica	SR Bosnia and Herzegovina	9th
Iskra	Bugojno	SR Bosnia and Herzegovina	7th
Istra Pula	Pula	SR Croatia	—
Jedinstvo Bihać	Bihać	SR Bosnia and Herzegovina	—
Kikinda	Kikinda	(Socialist Republic of Serbia) SAP Vojvodina	11th
Leotar	Trebinje	SR Bosnia and Herzegovina	10th
Maribor	Maribor	SR Slovenia	2nd
Novi Sad	Novi Sad	(Socialist Republic of Serbia) SAP Vojvodina	3rd
Proleter Zrenjanin	Zrenjanin	(Socialist Republic of Serbia) SAP Vojvodina	5th
Rudar Trbovlje	Trbovlje	SR Slovenia	—
Rudar Velenje	Velenje	SR Slovenia	12th
Spartak Subotica	Subotica	(Socialist Republic of Serbia) SAP Vojvodina	8th
Vrbas	Titov Vrbas	(Socialist Republic of Serbia) SAP Vojvodina	—
NK Zagreb	Zagreb	SR Croatia	—

=== League table ===
Pos	Team	Pld	W	D	L	GF	GA	GD	Pts	Promotion or relegation
1	NK Zagreb (C, P)	30	17	9	4	68	28	+40	43	Promotion to Yugoslav First League
2	Spartak Subotica	30	15	7	8	48	27	+21	37	
3	Dinamo Vinkovci	30	15	7	8	50	35	+15	37	
4	Iskra	30	15	2	13	51	48	+3	32	
5	Maribor	30	13	5	12	47	38	+9	31	
6	Vrbas	30	12	7	11	39	36	+3	31	
7	Leotar	30	13	5	12	34	32	+2	31	
8	Jedinstvo Bihać	30	12	7	11	38	38	0	31	
9	Proleter Zrenjanin	30	12	7	11	37	37	0	31	
10	Rudar	30	11	9	10	38	43	−5	31	
11	Bosna	30	12	6	12	37	38	−1	30	
12	Kikinda (R)	30	11	7	12	32	31	+1	29	Relegation to Inter-Republic Leagues
13	Novi Sad (R)	30	9	7	14	38	53	−15	25	Relegation to Inter-Republic Leagues
14	Istra Pula (R)	30	9	5	16	35	61	−26	23	Relegation to Inter-Republic Leagues
15	Famos Hrasnica (R)	30	8	6	16	29	36	−7	22	Relegation to Inter-Republic Leagues
16	Rudar Trbovlje (R)	30	5	6	19	17	57	−40	16	Relegation to Inter-Republic Leagues

Source: nkmaribor.com
Rules for classification: 1) points; 2) goal difference; 3) number of goals scored.
(C) Champions; (P) Promoted; (R) Relegated

== East Division ==
=== Teams ===
A total of sixteen teams contested the league, including eleven sides from the 1978–79 season, one club relegated from the 1977–78 Yugoslav First League and four sides promoted from the Inter-Republic Leagues played in the 1978–79 season. The league was contested in a double round robin format, with each club playing every other club twice, for a total of 30 rounds. Two points were awarded for wins and one point for draws.

OFK Belgrade were relegated from the 1978–79 Yugoslav First League after finishing the season in 18th place of the league table. The four clubs promoted to the second level were Bor, Pobeda, Prishtina and OFK Titograd.

Due to suspicion of match fixing in the last round of the league, Football Association of Yugoslavia penalized the top three clubs and Galenika Zemun earned a promotion spot to the Yugoslav First League. However, after an appeal in summer 1980 that decision was retracted and OFK Belgrade was promoted.

Locations of teams' home cities in the 1979–80 Yugoslav Second League East

Team	Location	Federal subject	Position in 1978–79
OFK Belgrade	Belgrade	SR Serbia	—
Bor	Bor	SR Serbia	—
Borac Čačak	Čačak	SR Serbia	7th
Dubočica	Leskovac	SR Serbia	9th
Galenika Zemun	Zemun	SR Serbia	4th
Majdanpek	Majdanpek	SR Serbia	11th
Pobeda	Prilep	SR Macedonia	—
Prishtina	Pristina	(Socialist Republic of Serbia) SAP Kosovo	—
Rad	Belgrade	SR Serbia	10th
Radnički Kragujevac	Kragujevac	SR Serbia	3rd
Radnički Pirot	Pirot	SR Serbia	6th
Sutjeska	Nikšić	SR Montenegro	5th
Šumadija Aranđelovac	Aranđelovac	SR Serbia	8th
Teteks	Tetovo	SR Macedonia	12th
OFK Titograd	Titograd	SR Montenegro	—
Trepča	Kosovska Mitrovica	(Socialist Republic of Serbia) SAP Kosovo	2nd

=== League table ===
Pos	Team	Pld	W	D	L	GF	GA	GD	Pts	Promotion or relegation
1	OFK Belgrade (C, P)	30	14	9	7	50	26	+24	37	Promotion to Yugoslav First League
2	Radnički Kragujevac	30	14	9	7	54	31	+23	37	
3	Bor	30	16	5	9	42	32	+10	37	
4	Galenika Zemun	30	14	8	8	49	37	+12	36	
5	Trepča	30	12	10	8	34	28	+6	34	
6	Prishtina	30	11	11	8	27	25	+2	33	
7	Borac Čačak	30	12	8	10	38	29	+9	32	
8	Teteks	30	11	9	10	30	28	+2	31	
9	Rad	30	12	7	11	41	40	+1	31	
10	Sutjeska Nikšić	30	12	3	15	41	44	−3	27	
11	Dubočica	30	7	13	10	24	31	−7	27	
12	Radnički Pirot	30	8	10	12	30	38	−8	26	
13	OFK Titograd	30	7	11	12	38	50	−12	25	
14	Pobeda (R)	30	8	9	13	36	49	−13	25	Relegation to Inter-Republic Leagues
15	Majdanpek (R)	30	7	10	13	19	38	−19	24	Relegation to Inter-Republic Leagues
16	Šumadija Aranđelovac (R)	30	6	6	18	29	56	−27	18	Relegation to Inter-Republic Leagues

Source: fsgzrenjanin.com
Rules for classification: 1) points; 2) goal difference; 3) number of goals scored.
(C) Champions; (P) Promoted; (R) Relegated

== See also ==
- 1979–80 Yugoslav First League
- 1979–80 Yugoslav Cup
