= RFK Novi Sad 1921 =

Serbian football club

Novi Sad
- Full name: RFK Novi Sad 1921
- Nickname: Kanarinci (The Canaries)
- Founded: 1921; 105 years ago
- Ground: Stadion Detelinara
- Capacity: 3,000
- President: Aleksandar Važić
- Head coach: Dušan Mitić
- 2024–25: Serbian League Vojvodina, 10th of 16
- Website: rfkns.rs
Home colours	Away colours

RFK Novi Sad 1921 (Serbian Cyrillic: РФК Нови Сад 1921) is a professional football club based in Novi Sad, Vojvodina, Serbia. As of the 2025-26 season, the club competes in the Serbian League Vojvodina, the 3rd tier of Serbian football.

== History ==
Founded in 1921 as NTK, the club was refounded in 1948 as FK Trgovački. They changed their name to FK Novi Sad in 1954. The club subsequently acquired the assets of NSK (formerly FK Eđšeg) through a merger in 1956.

In 1958, the club became part of newly formed Yugoslav Second League. Led by technical director Hugo Ruševljanin, they competed in Group East for three seasons, finishing as champions in 1960–61 to reach the Yugoslav First League for the first time ever. The club remained in the top flight of Yugoslav football until 1964. They subsequently spent two seasons in the Second League, finishing bottom of the table in 1965–66.

In 1966, the club merged with FK Radnički to form RFK Novi Sad. They finished as Serbian League North runners-up in 1966–67 before winning the title in 1967–68 to return to the Yugoslav Second League. The club spent the next 12 seasons in the second tier, including six seasons in Group North (1968–1974) and six seasons in Group West (1974–1980). They also reached the Yugoslav Cup semi-finals in 1976–77, losing to the eventual winners Hajduk Split. Later on, the club returned to the Second League after winning the Vojvodina League in 1982, remaining in the second tier until 1988.

After the breakup of Yugoslavia, the club advanced to the FR Yugoslavia Cup semi-finals in 1995–96. They also spent 14 consecutive seasons in the Second League of FR Yugoslavia/Serbia and Montenegro until 2006. The club promptly won the Serbian League Vojvodina in 2006–07 and took promotion to the Serbian First League. They competed in the second tier of Serbian football until 2013.

In 2014, the club was reformed as RFK Novi Sad 1921. They reached the Vojvodina League South in 2020. After winning the title in 2022, the club merged with FK Proleter Novi Sad, taking its Serbian First League spot.

== Recent league history ==
Season	Division	P	W	D	L	F	A	Pts	Pos
2020–21	4 - Vojvodina League South	34	20	10	4	60	33	70	3rd
2021–22	4 - Vojvodina League South	30	19	7	4	52	23	64	1st (Note: The club merged with Proleter and took their spot in the 2nd tier)
2022–23	2 - Serbian First League	37	14	8	15	44	51	50	7th
2023–24	2 - Serbian First League	37	8	7	22	37	62	31	15th
2024–25	3 - Serbian League Vojvodina	30	14	3	13	58	44	45	10th

== Current squad ==
As of 10 April 2024

Note: Flags indicate national team as defined under FIFA eligibility rules; some limited exceptions apply. Players may hold more than one non-FIFA nationality.

No.	Pos.	Nation	Player
1	GK	SRB	Ranko Puškić (on loan from Vojvodina)
3	DF	SRB	Nikola Varga
4	DF	SRB	Branislav Krstić
5	DF	SRB	Lazar Marković
7	MF	SRB	Mihajlo Milosavić (on loan from TSC)
8	MF	SRB	Aleksandar Rac
9	MF	SRB	Itan Derviši (on loan from Inđija Toyo Tires)
10	MF	SRB	Luka Serdar (on loan from Vojvodina)
11	FW	SRB	Lazar Vrekić (on loan from Čukarički)
12	GK	SRB	Ivan Knežević
18	DF	BIH	Omar Pašagić
20	MF	SRB	Aleksandar Stanisavljević

No.	Pos.	Nation	Player
21	DF	TAN	Alphonce Msanga (on loan from Spartak Subotica)
24	DF	SRB	Božidar Blagojević (captain)
25	FW	SRB	Andrija Mićić
27	DF	SRB	Marko Mandić
28	MF	SRB	Milan Gvozdenović (on loan from Radnički 1923)
29	FW	SRB	Branislav Marković
30	MF	BIH	Jovan Ilić
33	GK	SRB	Mane Marković
35	MF	SRB	Zoran Rakić
69	MF	SRB	Jovan Rosić
77	FW	SRB	Dušan Vlalukin

=== Out on loan ===
Note: Flags indicate national team as defined under FIFA eligibility rules; some limited exceptions apply. Players may hold more than one non-FIFA nationality.

No.	Pos.	Nation	Player
—	DF	SRB	Luka Kožović (at Studentski Grad until the end of the season)
—	MF	SRB	Pavle Jovišić (at Bačka until the end of the season)

No.	Pos.	Nation	Player
—	FW	SRB	Denis Stajki (at 1. Maj Ruma until the end of the season)
—	FW	SRB	Uroš Rakić (at Borac Šajkaš until the end of the season)

== Honours ==
- Yugoslav Second League (Tier 2)
  - 1960–61 (Group East)
- Serbian League North / Vojvodina League / Yugoslav Inter-Republic League / Serbian League Vojvodina (Tier 3)
  - 1967–68 / 1981–82 / 1991–92 (Group North) / 2006–07
- Vojvodina League South (Tier 4)
  - 2021–22

== Notable players ==
This is a list of players who have played at full international level.

- (Bulgaria) Zlatomir Zagorčić
- (Hong Kong) Anto Grabo
- (Hungary) Predrag Bošnjak
- (Israel) Slobodan Drapić
- (Montenegro) Šaleta Kordić
- (Serbia) Aleksandar Andrejević
- (Serbia) Milan Jovanić
- (Serbia) Branislav Jovanović
- (Serbia and Montenegro) Ljubiša Dunđerski
- (Serbia and Montenegro) (Socialist Federal Republic of Yugoslavia) Slaviša Jokanović
- (Serbia and Montenegro) Miodrag Pantelić
- (Slovenia) Milan Rakič
- (Tanzania) Morice Abraham
- (Socialist Federal Republic of Yugoslavia) Ivica Brzić
- (Socialist Federal Republic of Yugoslavia) Milan Jovin
- (Socialist Federal Republic of Yugoslavia) Aleksandar Kozlina
- (Socialist Federal Republic of Yugoslavia) Lazar Lemić
- (Socialist Federal Republic of Yugoslavia) Živan Ljukovčan
- (Socialist Federal Republic of Yugoslavia) Zoran Marić
- (Socialist Federal Republic of Yugoslavia) Đorđe Milić
- (Socialist Federal Republic of Yugoslavia) Josip Pirmajer

For a list of all RFK Novi Sad 1921 players with a Wikipedia article, see Category:RFK Novi Sad 1921 players.

== Historical list of coaches ==
- (Socialist Federal Republic of Yugoslavia) Aleksandar Petrović
- (Socialist Federal Republic of Yugoslavia) Hugo Ruševljanin (1958)
- (Socialist Federal Republic of Yugoslavia) Franjo Pazmanj
- (Socialist Federal Republic of Yugoslavia) Krešimir Arapović
- (Socialist Federal Republic of Yugoslavia) Ferenc Arok (1961-1962)
- (Socialist Federal Republic of Yugoslavia) Josip Pirmajer
- (Socialist Federal Republic of Yugoslavia) Milan Živadinović (1983–1984)
- (Socialist Federal Republic of Yugoslavia) Abdulah Gegić (1984–1985)
- (Socialist Federal Republic of Yugoslavia) Đorđe Milić (1985–1986)
- (Socialist Federal Republic of Yugoslavia) Miroslav Vukašinović (1986–1988)
- (Socialist Federal Republic of Yugoslavia) Ilija Tojagić
- (Serbia and Montenegro) Dragoljub Bekvalac (1992-1993)
- (Serbia and Montenegro) Josif Ilić
- (Serbia and Montenegro) Petar Kurćubić
- (Serbia) Momčilo Raičević (2006–2008)
- (Serbia) Milan Kosanović (2008–2009)
- (Montenegro) Dragan Radojičić (2009–2010)
- (Serbia) Zoran Govedarica (2010–2011)
- (Serbia) Josif Ilić (2011–2012)
- (Serbia) Bogdan Korak (2012–2013)
- (Bulgaria) Zoran Janković (2013)
- (Serbia) Mirko Babić (2013–2014)
- (Serbia) Ljubomir Kasalović (2014–2015)
- (Serbia) Mladen Jović
- (Serbia) Petar Bočković
- (Serbia) Dejan Vuletić (2018–2019)
- (Serbia) Mirko Babić (2019–2020)
- (Bulgaria) Zoran Janković (2020)
- (Serbia) Goran Raičević (2020)
- (Serbia) Zoran Šaraba (2020)
- (Serbia) Petar Kurćubić (2021)
- (Serbia) Miroslav Gordanić (2021)
- (Serbia) Vladimir Šponja (2021–2022)
- (Serbia) Aleksandar Radunović (2022)
- (Serbia) Branko Žigić (Aug 2022–2023)
- (Serbia) Nebojša Nešković (Aug 2023-Oct 23)
- (Serbia) Vidak Bratić (Oct 2023–2024)
- (Serbia) Darko Tešović (Mar 2024–2025)
- (Serbia) Dušan Mitić (2025-)
