= FK Radnički Sombor =

Football club from Sombor, Serbia

Radnički Sombor
- Full name: Fudbalski Klub Radnički Sombor
- Founded: 1912; 114 years ago
- Ground: Gradski stadion Sombor
- Capacity: 1,576
- Chairman: Stevan Koril
- Coach: Srđan Karalić
- League: PFL Sombor
- 2024–25: PFL Sombor, 7th
Home colours	Away colours

FK Radnički Sombor (Serbian Cyrillic: Фудбалски клуб Раднички Сомбор) is a football club from Sombor, Serbia. As of the 2025-26 season, the club competes in the PFL Sombor, in the 5th tier of Serbian football.

== History ==
FK Radnički Sombor was founded in 1912 as Somborski Sport Klub, often abbreviated to Somborski SK or sometimes also known as Sport Sombor. As the city was still within Austro-Hungary at that time, the club competed as Zombori Munkás TE in the Hungarian league system until 1914. During the First World War all football leagues were stopped, and only friendly matches took place. In 1918 Sombor became part of the Kingdom of Yugoslavia and the club played within the Subotica Subassociation League. The club achieved major success when they managed to play in the 1924 Yugoslav First League which was played in a cup system and they played against SK Jugoslavia in the semi-finals (lost 1:5). Somborski SK was coached by Ivan Veinber, and the following players played that game: goalkeeper Ivan Bogišić, and players Andrija Rack, Josif Mary, Ljudevit Lukić, Josip Šuljok, Ljudevir Ostrogonac, Ivan Šuljok, Ivan Car, Karl Krist, Bela Kaić, and the scorer of the only goal, Bela Mayer.

The club would not exist today if it was not the financial support they received from their sponsors during most of the time. One of the most notable games of the 1940s was in 1945 between Radnički Sombor and Radnički Belgrade; Radnički Sombor won the match 4–1. Their first season of professional league competition after Second World War was disappointing, with only three wins in ten matches. In the 1952–53 season Radnički Sombor finished second behind FK Dinamo Pančevo. In 1954 in the Vojvodina First League (national third tier) Radnički Sombor finished first; out of 88 games they won 47, drew 12, and lost 29. In the 1957–58 season they reaching the quarter-final in the Yugoslav Cup, where they lost to HNK Hajduk Split.

During the 1960s the club was promoted into the Yugoslav Second League. The stadiums were always packed, with tickets sold out a few days before the matches. Their fortunes again changed and they were moved out of the second tier and the club experienced financial troubles. In the 1971–72 season Radnički was back in the Vojvodina Provincial League. For the next ten years the club had very little success until the 1985/86 season, when they finished at the top of the league. In 1991/92 the club competed in the Inter-republics League North. Between 2009 and 2012 they were competing in second national level, the Serbian First League, but at the end of the 2011–12 season they were relegated to the Serbian League Vojvodina. In season 2014–15, Radnicki ended on 15th position, and they were relegated to Bačka Zone.

=== Recent league history ===
Season	Division	P	W	D	L	F	A	Pts	Pos
2020–21	4 - Vojvodina League North	34	6	4	24	28	102	22	16th
2021–22	5 - PFL Sombor	30	0	1	29	16	137	1	16th
2022–23	6 - MFL Sombor / 1st level	26	10	3	13	41	59	33	8th
2023–24	6 - MFL Sombor / 1st level	24	18	2	4	103	21	56	2nd
2024–25	5 - PFL Sombor	30	12	7	11	69	52	43	7th

== Notable players ==
For a list of all FK Radnički Sombor players with a Wikipedia article, see Category:FK Radnički Sombor players.
