= OFK Kikinda =

Serbian football club

- Full name: Omladinski fudbalski klub Kikinda
- Founded: 1909; 117 years ago
- Ground: Kikinda City Stadium
- Capacity: 7,500
- President: Žolt Gačka
- Head coach: Vladimir Kitanović
- League: Vojvodina League East
- 2025–26: Serbian League Vojvodina, 16th of 16 (relegated)
Home colours	Away colours

OFK Kikinda (Serbian Cyrillic: ОФК Кикинда) is a football club based in Kikinda, Vojvodina, Serbia. They compete in the Vojvodina League East, the fourth tier of the national league system.

== History ==
The first club in the town was founded in August 1909 as Nagykikindai Atlétikai Klub (NAK), competing within the Hungarian football league system. They stopped their activities during World War I. Later on, the club was reactivated as Kikindski atletski klub (KAK), before changing its name to AK Srbija.

Following World War II, the club became known as 6. oktobar. They qualified for the Serbian League, the third tier of Yugoslav football, in 1947. The club would also reach the Yugoslav Cup round of 16 in 1949, losing 7–3 to Hajduk Split.

During the early 1950s, the club changed its name twice, first to Trgovački and then to Banat. They would finish as Banat League champions in 1959 to earn promotion to the Vojvodina League. In 1961, the club merged with local rivals Radnički to form FK Odred. They subsequently won the Vojvodina League in the 1961–62 season, but lost in the promotion play-offs for the Yugoslav Second League. Over the next six seasons, the club played in the newly created Serbian League North.

After the reorganization of the national league system in 1968, the club competed in the reestablished Vojvodina League. They would suffer relegation to the Banat League in 1970. In 1971, the club changed its name to OFK Kikinda. They returned to the Vojvodina League in 1973. The club managed to win the title in 1976 and gained promotion to the Yugoslav Second League. They placed third in Group West in their debut appearance in the second tier.

In the 1979–80 season, the club made one of its biggest achievements by reaching the semi-finals of the Yugoslav Cup, before losing 3–1 to the eventual winners Dinamo Zagreb. They also suffered relegation from the Second League that year, but secured an instant promotion back as Vojvodina League champions in 1980–81. Over the next 11 seasons, the club competed in the second tier of Yugoslav football.

After the breakup of Yugoslavia, the club was promoted to the newly created First League of FR Yugoslavia. They spent two seasons in the top flight before suffering relegation in 1993–94. The club finished as runners-up in the 1995–96 Second League of FR Yugoslavia and returned to the First League for one more season.

From 1997 to 2000, the club played in the Second League of FR Yugoslavia, before suffering relegation to the Serbian League Vojvodina. They spent the next six seasons in the third tier of Serbia and Montenegro football. Known as FK Kikinda, the club won the Vojvodina League East in 2007–08 and took promotion to the third tier of Serbian football.

In August 2009, the club celebrated its 100th anniversary, changing its name back to OFK Kikinda. They were relegated to the fourth tier in 2012 and eventually to the fifth tier in 2015.

=== Recent league history ===
Season	Division	P	W	D	L	F	A	Pts	Pos
2020–21	4 - Vojvodina League East	32	24	3	5	81	25	75	1st
2021–22	3 - Serbian League Vojvodina	30	8	2	20	24	55	26	16th
2022–23	4 - Vojvodina League East	30	21	5	4	67	17	68	1st
2023–24	3 - Serbian League Vojvodina	30	12	10	8	34	24	46	5th
2024–25	3 - Serbian League Vojvodina	30	11	13	6	50	28	46	9th

== Honours ==
- Vojvodina League (Tier 3)
  - Champions (2): 1975–76, 1980–81
- Vojvodina League East (Tier 4)
  - Champions (3): 2007–08, 2020–21, 2022–23

== Notable players ==
This is a list of players who have played at full international level.

- (Hungary) Predrag Bošnjak
- (Serbia) Dimitrije Injac
- (Serbia) (Serbia and Montenegro) Mladen Krstajić
- (Serbia and Montenegro) Dragan Žilić
- (Socialist Federal Republic of Yugoslavia) Blagoje Paunović
- (Socialist Federal Republic of Yugoslavia) Božidar Sandić

For a list of all OFK Kikinda players with a Wikipedia article, see Category:OFK Kikinda players.

== Historical list of coaches ==
- (Socialist Federal Republic of Yugoslavia) Božidar Sandić
- (Socialist Federal Republic of Yugoslavia) Tomislav Manojlović (1976–1977)
- (Socialist Federal Republic of Yugoslavia) Milutin Šoškić (1977–1978)
- (Socialist Federal Republic of Yugoslavia) Tomislav Manojlović
- (Socialist Federal Republic of Yugoslavia) Milan Kovrlija
- (Federal Republic of Yugoslavia) Vlada Pejović (1992)
- (Federal Republic of Yugoslavia) Milorad Sekulović (1993)
- (Federal Republic of Yugoslavia) Milan Kovrlija (1993)
- (Federal Republic of Yugoslavia) Đurađ Kresoja
- (Serbia) Žarko Soldo (2008-2009)
- (Serbia) Dragojlo Stanojlović (2012)
- (Serbia) Jevto Jarčević
- (Serbia) Slobodan Živkov
- (Serbia) Aleksandar Kresoja (2018–2019)
- (Serbia) Vladimir Kitanović (2020)
- (Serbia) Marko Guteša (2021)
- (Serbia) Nenad Kovačević (Jul 2021–2022)
- (Serbia) Jevto Jarčević (Mar 2022–2023)
- (Serbia) Vladimir Šponja (Jun 2023–Jun 2024)
- (Serbia) Zdravko Trivković (Jun 2024-Nov 24)
- (Serbia) Dušan Đokić (2024-2025)
- (Serbia) Vladimir Kitanović (Jul 2025-)
