= Yugoslav Second League =

- Founded: 1947
- Folded: 1992
- Country: Yugoslavia
- Level on pyramid: 2
- Promotion to: Yugoslav First League
- Relegation to: Yugoslav Third League; Inter-Republic Leagues

Yugoslav Second League (Bosnian: Druga savezna liga, Croatian: Druga savezna liga, Serbian: Друга савезна лига, Slovenian: Druga zvezna liga,MACEDONIAN: Втора сојузна лига, Second Federal league) was the second tier football league of SFR Yugoslavia. The top clubs were promoted to the top tier, the Yugoslav First League.

Although the Yugoslav First League had existed since 1923, the unified Second League was only introduced in 1947. It existed until 1992.

== League format ==
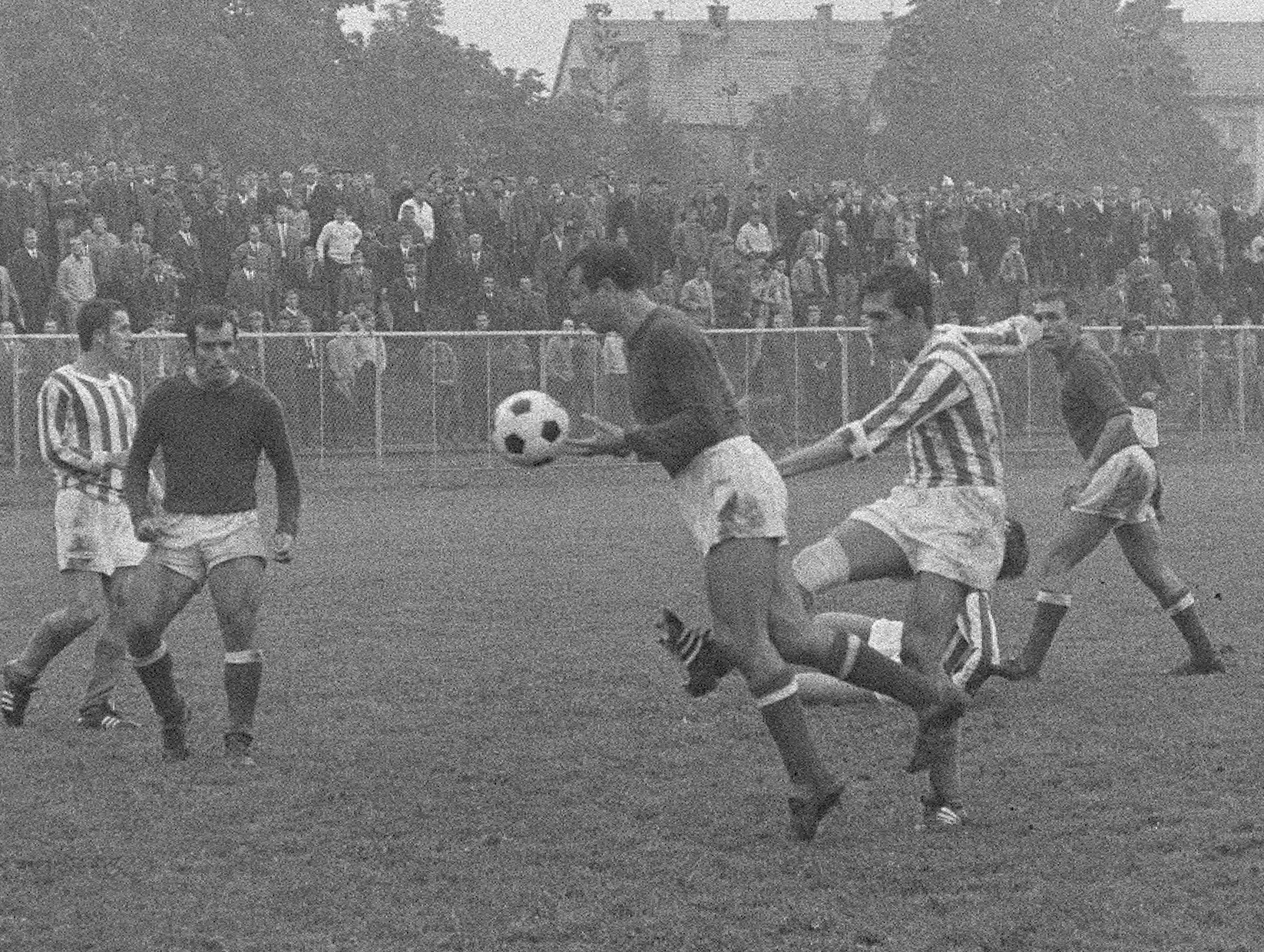
NK Železničar Maribor vs RSD Šibenik on 10 September 1969.

Over the years, the league changed its format many times:

- In 1946–47 each of the six Yugoslav federal republics had its own league (SR Bosnia and Herzegovina, SR Croatia, SR Macedonia, SR Montenegro, SR Serbia and SR Slovenia)
- In 1947–48 the leagues were merged into a single national "Unified League" (Jedinstvena liga)
- In 1952 each of the republics played its own second-level "Republic League" again (Republička liga)
- In 1952–53 a number of "Inter-republic Leagues" were played (Međurepubličke lige)
- In 1953–54 a single "Unified League" was played again
- In 1955–56 the league was split into four regional groups called "zones" (zone, singular zona) with a total of 5 groups marked by roman numerals, called Zone I, Zone II-A, Zone II-B, Zone III, and Zone IV (I. Zona, II. A Zona, II. B Zona, III. Zona, IV. Zona)
- In 1958–59 this was reduced to only two regional divisions covering the entire country, named East and West (Istok and Zapad)
- In 1968–69 they were replaced by four regional divisions: East, West, North and South (Istok, Zapad, Sever/Sjever, and Jug)
- In 1973–74 the system returned to two regional groups, named East and West (Istok and Zapad)
- In 1988–89 these were merged into a single national "Unified League" again, which was played in this format for three seasons until 1990–91 and the breakup of Yugoslavia

In total:

- 10 seasons were played as a single national league (1947–51, 1953–55, and 1988–92)
- 25 seasons had two regional divisions (1958–68, and 1973–88)

== Seasons ==
| Season | Division | Winners | Runners-up | Third place | Promoted |
Republic Leagues
| 1946–47 | | | | | Torpedo Sarajevo |
Yugoslav Second League
| 1947–48 | | Budućnost Titograd | Sloga Novi Sad | Naša Krila Zemun | Budućnost Titograd, Sloga Novi Sad, Naša Krila Zemun |
| 1948–49 | | FK Sarajevo | Mornar Split | Spartak Subotica | FK Sarajevo, Spartak Subotica |
| 1950 | | Borac Zagreb | Napredak Kruševac | Sloga Novi Sad | Borac Zagreb, Napredak Kruševac, Sloga Novi Sad, Podrinje Šabac |
| 1951 | | Vardar | Rabotnički | Budućnost Titograd | Vardar, Rabotnički, NK Zagreb |
Republic Leagues
| 1952 | Bosnia and Herzegovina; Croatia; Macedonia; Montenegro; Serbia; Slovenia | Velež Mostar; Proleter Osijek; Pobeda; Budućnost Titograd; Spartak Subotica; Odred Ljubljana | Sloboda Tuzla; Metalac Zagreb; Napredok; Sutjeska Nikšić; Dinamo Pančevo; Branik Maribor | Borac Banja Luka/Bosna Sarajevo; Kvarner Rijeka; Tikveš; Lovćen; Napredak Kruševac/Radnički Beograd; Rudar Trbovlje | Velež Mostar, Spartak Subotica |
Inter-Republic and Republic Leagues
| 1952–53 | Bosnia and Herzegovina; Croatia-Slovenia; Macedonia; Montenegro; Serbia | Borac Banja Luka; Proleter Osijek; Rabotnički; Budućnost Titograd; Radnički Beograd | Željezničar Sarajevo; Odred Ljubljana; Rabotnik; Lovćen; Mačva Šabac | Jedinstvo Brčko; Šibenik; Bregalnica Štip; Radnički Ivangrad; Napredak Kruševac | Proleter Osijek, Odred Ljubljana, Rabotnički, Radnički Beograd |
Yugoslav Second League
| 1953–54 | | NK Zagreb | Željezničar Sarajevo | Velež Mostar | NK Zagreb, Željezničar Sarajevo |
| 1954–55 | | Velež Mostar | Budućnost Titograd | Metalac Zagreb | Velež Mostar, Budućnost Titograd |
Zones Leagues
| 1955–56 | I Zone; II A Zone; II B Zone; III Zone; IV Zone | Lokomotiva Zagreb; Čelik Zenica; Lovćen; Borovo; Vardar | Šibenik; Borac Banja Luka; Radnički Nikšić; Budućnost Valjevo; Radnički Kragujevac | Odred Ljubljana; Mladost Prijedor; Arsenal Tivat; Smederevo; Sloga Kraljevo | Lokomotiva Zagreb, Vardar |
| 1956–57 | I Zone; II A Zone; II B Zone; III Zone; IV Zone | RNK Split; Željezničar Sarajevo; Lovćen; Borovo; Radnički Kragujevac | Šibenik; Čelik Zenica; Nikšić; Proleter Zrenjanin; Radnički Niš | Rijeka; Borac Banja Luka; Dubrovnik; Proleter Osijek; Sloga Kraljevo | RNK Split, Željezničar Sarajevo |
| 1957–58 | I Zone; II A Zone; II B Zone; III Zone; IV Zone | Rijeka; FK Sarajevo; Nikšić; Proleter Zrenjanin; Napredak Kruševac | Lokomotiva Zagreb; Sloboda Tuzla; Lovćen; Proleter Osijek; Rabotnički | Trešnjevka; Čelik Zenica; Arsenal Tivat; Radnički Sombor; Radnički Niš | Rijeka, FK Sarajevo |
Yugoslav Second League – East, West
| 1958–59 | East; West | OFK Beograd; Sloboda Tuzla | Spartak Subotica; Lokomotiva Zagreb | Radnički Sombor; RNK Split | OFK Beograd, Sloboda Tuzla |
| 1959–60 | East; West | Vardar; RNK Split | FK Novi Sad; Trešnjevka | Sutjeska Nikšić; Borac Banja Luka | Vardar, RNK Split |
| 1960–61 | East; West | FK Novi Sad; Borac Banja Luka | Budućnost Titograd; Željezničar Sarajevo | Radnički Sombor; Trešnjevka | FK Novi Sad, Borac Banja Luka |
| 1961–62 | East; West | Budućnost Titograd; Željezničar Sarajevo | Radnički Niš; Sloboda Tuzla | Radnički Beograd; Trešnjevka | Budućnost Titograd, Radnički Niš, Željezničar Sarajevo, Sloboda Tuzla |
| 1962–63 | East; West | Vardar; Trešnjevka | Radnički Beograd; Čelik Zenica | Trepča; Maribor | Vardar, Trešnjevka |
| 1963–64 | East; West | Sutjeska Nikšić; NK Zagreb | Bor; Maribor | Radnički Beograd; Borac Banja Luka | Sutjeska Nikšić, NK Zagreb |
| 1964–65 | East; West | Radnički Beograd; Olimpija Ljubljana | Proleter Zrenjanin; Sloboda Tuzla | Budućnost Titograd; Maribor | Radnički Beograd, Olimpija Ljubljana |
| 1965–66 | East; West | Sutjeska Nikšić; Čelik Zenica | Proleter Zrenjanin; Sloboda Tuzla | Pobeda; Borovo | Sutjeska Nikšić, Čelik Zenica |
| 1966–67 | East; West | Proleter Zrenjanin; Maribor | Priština; Osijek | Radnički Sombor; Sloboda Tuzla | Proleter Zrenjanin, Maribor |
| 1967–68 | East; West | Bor; Čelik Zenica | Trepča; Sloboda Tuzla | Sloga Kraljevo; Osijek | Bor, Čelik Zenica |
Yugoslav Second League – East, North, South, West
| 1968–69 | East; South; North; West | Radnički Kragujevac; Budućnost Titograd; Sloboda Tuzla; Orijent Rijeka | Trepča; Sutjeska Nikšić; Crvenka; Borac Banja Luka | Sloboda Užice; Bosna Sarajevo; Osijek; NK Varteks | Radnički Kragujevac, Sloboda Tuzla |
| 1969–70 | East; South; North; West | Sloga Kraljevo; Sutjeska Nikšić; Osijek; Rijeka | Borac Čačak; Budućnost Titograd; Crvenka; Borac Banja Luka | Priština; Pofalićki; Proleter Zrenjanin; Rudar Ljubija | Crvenka, Borac Banja Luka |
| 1970–71 | East; South; North; West | Vardar; Sutjeska Nikšić; Proleter Zrenjanin; Rijeka | Borac Čačak; Budućnost Titograd; Osijek; Rudar Ljubija | Pobeda; Bosna Visoko; Spartak Subotica; NK Zagreb | Vardar, Sutjeska Nikšić |
| 1971–72 | East; South; North; West | Bor; Budućnost Titograd; Spartak Subotica; Rijeka | Priština; Rudar Kakanj; Crvenka; Rudar Ljubija | Napredak Kruševac; GOŠK; RFK Novi Sad; NK Zagreb | Bor, Spartak Subotica |
| 1972–73 | East; South; North; West | Borac Čačak; Budućnost Titograd; Osijek; NK Zagreb | Priština; Famos Hrasnica; Proleter Zrenjanin; Maribor | Šumadija Aranđelovac; Igman Ilidža; RFK Novi Sad; Karlovac | Proleter Zrenjanin, NK Zagreb |
Yugoslav Second League – East, West
| 1973–74 | East; West | Radnički Kragujevac; Rijeka | Borac Čačak; Osijek | Priština; Kozara B. Gradiška | Radnički Kragujevac, Rijeka |
| 1974–75 | East; West | Budućnost Titograd; Borac Banja Luka | Sutjeska Nikšić; NK Zagreb | Napredak Kruševac; RFK Novi Sad | Budućnost Titograd, Borac Banja Luka |
| 1975–76 | East; West | Napredak Kruševac; NK Zagreb | Rad; Osijek | Radnički Pirot; RFK Novi Sad | Napredak Kruševac, NK Zagreb |
| 1976–77 | East; West | Trepča; Osijek | Vardar; RFK Novi Sad | Radnički Pirot; OFK Kikinda | Trepča, Osijek |
| 1977–78 | East; West | Napredak Kruševac; Željezničar Sarajevo | Teteks; Proleter Zrenjanin | Vardar; OFK Kikinda | Napredak Kruševac, Željezničar Sarajevo |
| 1978–79 | East; West | Vardar; Čelik Zenica | Trepča; Maribor | Radnički Kragujevac; RFK Novi Sad | Vardar, Čelik Zenica |
| 1979–80 | East; West | OFK Beograd; NK Zagreb | Radnički Kragujevac; Dinamo Vinkovci | Bor; Spartak Subotica | OFK Beograd, NK Zagreb |
| 1980–81 | East; West | Teteks; Osijek | Galenika Zemun; Iskra Bugojno | Rad; Dinamo Vinkovci | Teteks, Osijek |
| 1981–82 | East; West | Galenika Zemun; Dinamo Vinkovci | Trepča; Spartak Subotica | Timok; Čelik Zenica | Galenika Zemun, Dinamo Vinkovci |
| 1982–83 | East; West | Priština; Čelik Zenica | Sutjeska Nikšić; Iskra Bugojno | Teteks; Jedinstvo Brčko | Priština, Čelik Zenica |
| 1983–84 | East; West | Sutjeska Nikšić; Iskra Bugojno | OFK Beograd; Spartak Subotica | Pelister; Proleter Zrenjanin | Sutjeska Nikšić, Iskra Bugojno |
| 1984–85 | East; West | OFK Beograd; Čelik Zenica | Novi Pazar; Šibenik | Pelister; Spartak Subotica | OFK Beograd, Čelik Zenica |
| 1985–86 | East; West | Radnički Niš; Spartak Subotica | Rad; Iskra Bugojno | Radnički Kragujevac; Leotar | Radnički Niš, Spartak Subotica |
| 1986–87 | East; West | Rad; Vojvodina | OFK Beograd; RFK Novi Sad | Novi Pazar; OFK Kikinda | Rad, Vojvodina |
| 1987–88 | East; West | Napredak Kruševac; Spartak Subotica | OFK Beograd; GOŠK-Jug | Pelister; Dinamo Vinkovci | Napredak Kruševac, Spartak Subotica |
Yugoslav Second League
| 1988–89 | | Olimpija Ljubljana | Borac Banja Luka | Proleter Zrenjanin | Olimpija Ljubljana, Borac Banja Luka |
| 1989–90 | | Zemun | Proleter Zrenjanin | Sutjeska Nikšić | Zemun, Proleter Zrenjanin |
| 1990–91 | | NK Zagreb | Vardar | OFK Beograd | Vardar, OFK Beograd, Sutjeska Nikšić, Pelister (FR Yugoslavia); NK Zagreb, Šibenik, Cibalia, GOŠK-Jug (Croatia) |
| 1991–92 | | Bečej | Hajduk Kula | Radnički Beograd | |

== See also ==
Second League West Clubs Association

- Yugoslav First League
- Yugoslav Third League
- Slovenian Republic League
