= List of FK Spartak Subotica managers =

FK Spartak Subotica is a professional football club based in Subotica, Vojvodina, Serbia.

== Managers ==
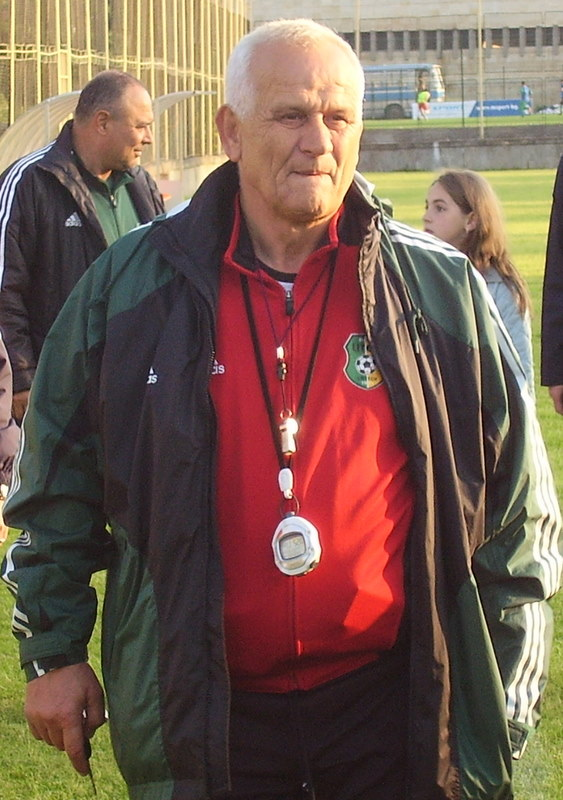
Ljupko Petrović

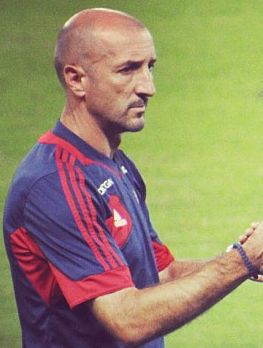
Ranko Popović

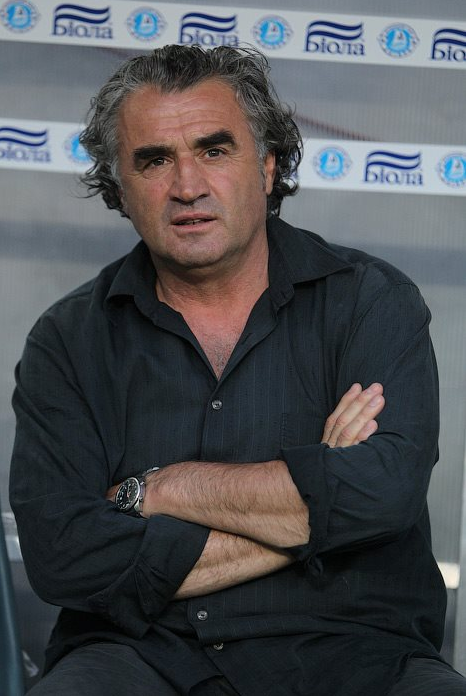
Dragan Miranović

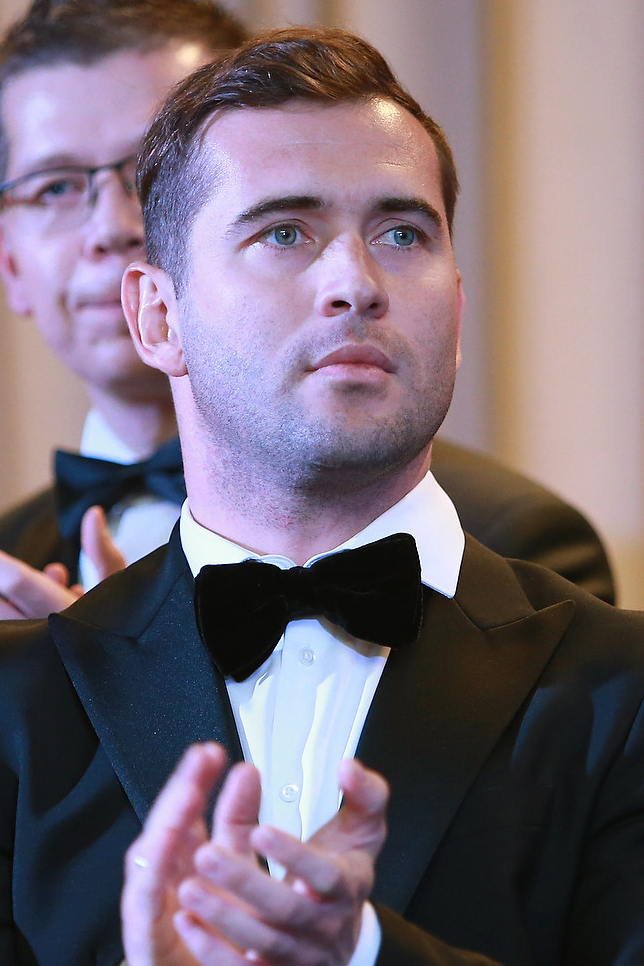
Aleksandr Kerzhakov

Name	Period		Pld	W	D	L	Win %	Honours
Name	From	To	Pld	W	D	L	Win %	Honours
(Socialist Federal Republic of Yugoslavia) Blagoje Marjanović								
(Socialist Federal Republic of Yugoslavia) Branislav Sekulić								
(Socialist Federal Republic of Yugoslavia) Stipan Kopilović								
(Socialist Federal Republic of Yugoslavia) Ilija Rajković								
(Socialist Federal Republic of Yugoslavia) Lajoš Jakovetić	July 1960	1963						1961–62 Yugoslav Cup runners-up
(Socialist Federal Republic of Yugoslavia) Tihomir Ognjanov	1963	1966						
(Socialist Federal Republic of Yugoslavia) Josip Takač								
(Socialist Federal Republic of Yugoslavia) Dragutin Spasojević	July 1970	August 1970						
(Socialist Federal Republic of Yugoslavia) Dušan Drašković	August 1970	July 1973						1971–72 Yugoslav Second League (Group North)
(Socialist Federal Republic of Yugoslavia) Dušan Maravić	July 1973	March 1974						
(Socialist Federal Republic of Yugoslavia) Dejan Vrana	March 1974							
(Socialist Federal Republic of Yugoslavia) Milan Živadinović		1975						1974–75 Vojvodina League
(Socialist Federal Republic of Yugoslavia) Dušan Drašković	July 1977	July 1980						1977–78 Vojvodina League
(Socialist Federal Republic of Yugoslavia) Luka Malešev	1980							
(Socialist Federal Republic of Yugoslavia) Tihomir Ognjanov		1981						
(Socialist Federal Republic of Yugoslavia) Boris Marović	1981	1982						
(Socialist Federal Republic of Yugoslavia) Ivica Brzić	1982	1983						
(Socialist Federal Republic of Yugoslavia) Stevan Ostojić	1983							
(Socialist Federal Republic of Yugoslavia) Josip Zemko		1984						
(Socialist Federal Republic of Yugoslavia) Milan Ribar	1984	1985						
(Socialist Federal Republic of Yugoslavia) Slobodan Kustudić	1985	1987						1985–86 Yugoslav Second League (Group West)
(Socialist Federal Republic of Yugoslavia) Dušan Drašković	1987	1987						
(Socialist Federal Republic of Yugoslavia) Ljupko Petrović	1987	1988						1987–88 Yugoslav Second League (Group West)
(Socialist Federal Republic of Yugoslavia) Đorđe Gerum	1988	1989						
(Socialist Federal Republic of Yugoslavia) Josip Zemko	1989	August 1989						
(Socialist Federal Republic of Yugoslavia) Andrija Perčić	September 1989	October 1989						
(Socialist Federal Republic of Yugoslavia) Tihomir Ognjanov	October 1989							
(Socialist Federal Republic of Yugoslavia) Josip Zemko	January 1990	September 1990						
(Socialist Federal Republic of Yugoslavia) Gojko Zec	September 1990							
(Socialist Federal Republic of Yugoslavia) Petar Jović		March 1991						
(Socialist Federal Republic of Yugoslavia) Danilo Mandić	March 1991	1991						
(Socialist Federal Republic of Yugoslavia) Stanislav Karasi	1991							
(Socialist Federal Republic of Yugoslavia) Žarko Nedeljković		1992						
(Federal Republic of Yugoslavia) Miloš Cetina	1992	March 1993						
(Federal Republic of Yugoslavia) Drago Jovičević	1993	May 1993						
(Federal Republic of Yugoslavia) Dejan Vrana	May 1993	1993						
(Federal Republic of Yugoslavia) Slobodan Kustudić	1993	1994						1993–94 FR Yugoslavia Cup runners-up
(Federal Republic of Yugoslavia) Radivoje Đurović	1994							
(Federal Republic of Yugoslavia) Slobodan Kustudić		1995						
(Federal Republic of Yugoslavia) Tomislav Taušan	1995							
(Federal Republic of Yugoslavia) Ivan Čabrinović		1997						
(Federal Republic of Yugoslavia) Radivoje Đurović	1997							
(Federal Republic of Yugoslavia) Slobodan Kustudić								
(Federal Republic of Yugoslavia) Radivoje Đurović								
(Croatia) Josip Duvančić	1998	1998						
(Federal Republic of Yugoslavia) Ivica Budaković	1998							
(Federal Republic of Yugoslavia) Slobodan Kustudić		1999						
(Federal Republic of Yugoslavia) Vukašin Višnjevac	1999	1999						
(Federal Republic of Yugoslavia) Tomislav Sivić	November 1999	December 1999						
(Federal Republic of Yugoslavia) Dragan Šaković		2000						
(Federal Republic of Yugoslavia) Milutin Sredojević	2000	2000						
(Federal Republic of Yugoslavia) Radivoje Đurović	June 2000							
(Federal Republic of Yugoslavia) Milorad Sekulović		2002						
(Federal Republic of Yugoslavia) Slobodan Kustudić	July 2002	2002						
(Federal Republic of Yugoslavia) Veljko Popović	2002	2002						
(Federal Republic of Yugoslavia) Puniša Memedović	September 2002	2003						
(Serbia and Montenegro) Radivoje Đurović	July 2003	October 2003						
(Serbia and Montenegro) Rudolf Rafai	October 2003	December 2003						
(Serbia and Montenegro) Predrag Pejović	December 2003	2004						2003–04 Serbian League Vojvodina
(Serbia and Montenegro) Srđan Bajić	July 2004	September 2006						
(Serbia) Tomislav Sivić	September 2006	April 2007						
(Serbia) Predrag Pejović	April 2007	2007						
(Serbia) Radivoje Đurović	2007	2008						
(Serbia) Ranko Popović	July 2008	May 2009						
(Serbia) Slavko Vojičić	May 2009	June 2009						
(Serbia) Zoran Milinković	June 2009	May 2010						
(Serbia) Dragan Miranović	June 2010	November 2010						
(Serbia) Ilija Dobrić (caretaker)	November 2010	December 2010						
(Serbia) Ljubomir Ristovski	December 2010	June 2011						
(Serbia) Zoran Njeguš	June 2011	February 2012						
(Serbia) Zoran Milinković	February 2012	September 2012						
(Serbia) Zoran Marić	September 2012	September 2012						
(Serbia) Petar Kurćubić	September 2012	October 2013						
(North Macedonia) Dragi Kanatlarovski	October 2013	June 2014						
(Serbia) Petar Kurćubić	June 2014	April 2015						
(Serbia) Stevan Mojsilović	April 2015	October 2015						
(Russia) Andrey Chernyshov	October 2015	May 2017						
(Serbia) Aleksandar Veselinović	June 2017	April 2018						
(Serbia) Vladimir Gaćinović	April 2018	October 2018						
(Serbia) Predrag Rogan	October 2018	June 2019						
(Serbia) Vladimir Gaćinović	June 2019	November 2020						
(Serbia) Vladimir Buač	November 2020	October 2021						
(Serbia) Vladimir Gaćinović	October 2021	February 2022						
(Serbia) Nebojša Vučković	February 2022	April 2022						
(Serbia) Slavko Petrović	April 2022	September 2022						
(Serbia) Ljubiša Dunđerski	September 2022	March 2023						
(Serbia) Milan Milanović	March 2023	June 2023						
(Russia) Aleksandr Kerzhakov	June 2023	November 2023						
(Serbia) Nenad Lalatović	November 2023	April 2024						
(Serbia) Miloš Kruščić	April 2024	October 2024						
(Serbia) Vladimir Gaćinović	October 2024	February 2025						
(Serbia) Tomislav Sivić	February 2025	June 2025						
(Serbia) Dušan Đorđević	June 2025	September 2025						
(Serbia) Đorđe Tutorić (Note: Tutorić initially served as a caretaker manager before being appointed on a permanent basis in October 2025.)	September 2025	December 2025						
(Serbia) Miloš Kruščić	December 2025							
