= Vladimir Torbica =

Serbian footballer

Personal information
- Full name: Vladimir Torbica
- Date of birth: 20 September 1980 (age 46)
- Place of birth: Sombor, SFR Yugoslavia
- Height: 1.75 m (5 ft 9 in)
- Position: Midfielder

Senior career*
| Years | Team | Apps | (Gls) |
| 1997–2007 | Mladost Apatin | 99 | (19) |
| 2007–2008 | Zlatibor Voda | 23 | (6) |
| 2008–2019 | Spartak Subotica | 294 | (44) |
| Total | | 416 | (69) |

International career
| 1998 | FR Yugoslavia U18 (Note: Only official UEFA matches included) | 3 | (0) |
- * Club domestic league appearances and goals

Vladimir Torbica (Serbian Cyrillic: Владимир Торбица; born 20 September 1980) is a Serbian former professional footballer who played as a midfielder.

== Club career ==
Born in Sombor, Torbica made his senior debuts at Mladost Apatin in 1997. He spent the following 10 seasons at the club, before moving to Zlatibor Voda in 2007. After winning the Serbian League Vojvodina in the 2007–08 campaign, the club merged with Spartak Subotica and continued to compete in the Serbian First League.

In early 2009, Torbica spent some time training with Partizan, but the transfer never happened. He eventually returned to Spartak Subotica and led the side to promotion to the Serbian SuperLiga. Subsequently, Torbica helped the club finish in fourth place in its first season in the top flight after a decade, thus earning a spot in the 2010–11 UEFA Europa League. He converted two penalties for a 2–1 home win over Dnipro Dnipropetrovsk in the first leg of the third qualifying round. However, they were eliminated after a 0–2 loss at Dnipro-Arena.

After having spent over a decade with Spartak Subotica, Torbica retired at the conclusion of the 2018–19 season.

== International career ==
Torbica made three appearances for FR Yugoslavia at under-18 level during the team's unsuccessful qualifiers for the 1999 UEFA Under-18 Championship.

== Statistics ==
| Club | Season | League | | Cup | | Continental | | Total | |
| Club | Season | Apps | Goals | Apps | Goals | Apps | Goals | Apps | Goals |
|---|---|---|---|---|---|---|---|---|---|
| Spartak Subotica | 2009–10 | 25 | 1 | 2 | 0 | — | | 27 | 1 |
| Spartak Subotica | 2010–11 | 28 | 8 | 2 | 0 | 4 | 3 | 34 | 11 |
| Spartak Subotica | 2011–12 | 28 | 9 | 2 | 0 | — | | 30 | 9 |
| Spartak Subotica | 2012–13 | 27 | 3 | 3 | 0 | — | | 30 | 3 |
| Spartak Subotica | 2013–14 | 26 | 4 | 5 | 1 | — | | 31 | 5 |
| Spartak Subotica | 2014–15 | 28 | 4 | 3 | 0 | — | | 31 | 4 |
| Spartak Subotica | 2015–16 | 27 | 4 | 5 | 0 | — | | 32 | 4 |
| Spartak Subotica | 2016–17 | 33 | 2 | 0 | 0 | — | | 33 | 2 |
| Spartak Subotica | 2017–18 | 26 | 2 | 2 | 2 | — | | 28 | 4 |
| Spartak Subotica | 2018–19 | 15 | 0 | 2 | 0 | 5 | 0 | 22 | 0 |
| Spartak Subotica | Total | 263 | 37 | 26 | 3 | 9 | 3 | 298 | 43 |
