= Marinci (supporter group) =

Plavi Marinci
- Nickname: Golubovi (Pigeons)
- Abbreviation: PM89
- Founded: March 1989
- Type: Supporters' group, Ultras group
- Team: Spartak Subotica
- Headquarters: Subotica, Serbia
- Stadium: Subotica City Stadium
- Coordinates: 46°04′54.41″N 19°40′37.05″E

Plavi Marinci (Serbian Cyrillic: Плави Маринци, lit. 'Blue Marines'), or simply Marinci, are the organised supporters of the Serbian professional football club Spartak Subotica. They generally support all clubs within the Spartak Subotica Sports Society and mostly wear blue and white symbols, which are also the club's colors.

== History ==
Spartak Subotica has always had its own fans base, which was formerly known as Plavi Golubovi (The Blue Pigeons). The nickname derived most likely from the successful period of Spartak Subotica, in the 1940s and 1950s, where the original Spartak jerseys were pigeon blue with white sleeves. The style was similar to a traditional Arsenal shirt, but in different colors.

During the 1987–88 Yugoslav Second League season, Spartak fans travelled to Vinkovci for a match against Dinamo for the promotion to the Yugoslav First League. Around two thousand Spartak supporters celebrated the team's victory that day. From the moment when Spartak settled in the major league, the club proved to be a difficult opponent for teams in the Yugoslav First League. This was demonstrated by the fact that, following a recommendation of a special committee of the major league, from the locker rooms to pitch was built a wired tunnel, through it passed the players to separate players from the crowd.

In December 1988, the first organized gathering and cheering was at the championship match against Dinamo Zagreb. In March 1989, appeared the first large transparent and the group in spite of several proposals adopted the name Plavi Marinci (Blue Marines), a small group of guys mostly from Prozivka, but also from other parts of Subotica, as heirs of the Spartak fans from the 1970s. The founders of the group had the idea from an Italian Tifo magazine, but today it is not clear whether the idea for the name Marinci was in question as a branch of the army, or it was the blue marine as shades of blue, but from the beginning they mean Marinci (Marines), as member of an infantry force of the Yugoslav Navy.

Since the foundation, the group has begun to gather regularly at the Subotica City Stadium to support their local club. That was the year of the trip from a larger group of Marinci to Osijek or to Split against Hajduk. They travelled across the whole former Yugoslavia, even for a basketball match to Romania. In those years, the Marinci was a group that went on tours in numbers of about hundred people, and at the home matches a few hundred more, main from Prozivka, Aleksandrova, Radijalac, and a group of about thirty Marinci from Sombor, all without any help of the club. Last cheering expansion movement took place in 1994, when Spartak reached the finals of the Yugoslav Cup against Partizan Belgrade, and finished the championship as fifth. Nowadays they are a relatively small group, but in the last years, and especially since the growing local patriotism in Serbian fan scene, more and more young and new generations from Subotica accepted Spartak as their only club and became its supporters. Many of the local population have now the opinion that there is nothing more beautiful than the support of his club in their own town or region, so no matter where and no matter in which league the club plays. The goal of the Marinci is to continue and encourage the local patriotism, to grow as a group and in their organization.

== Controversies ==
On 29 November 2012, the Marinci came to training of Spartak Subotica to criticized attacker and former Red Star youth player Đorđe Despotović because, as he visited a TV show on SOS Channel, he wore a T-shirt which stood in relation to Red Star Belgrade. Other media report that he was being threatened and he dare not out of the house. However, there was absolut no physical confrontation, but the Marinci just expressed his opinion and then leave. The situation was calmed by coach Petar Kurčubić, who agreed with the fans that Despotović made a thoughtless move, but it also reminded all of the goals that the young Serbia national team player achieved so far, suggesting that it is more important than the choice of his shirt. Recall, Despotović scored several goals during the Serbian SuperLiga season, including one against Red Star. The moderator asked Despotović during the broadcast, if he thought that the shirt could cause a negative reaction from fans from Subotica, he replied that he believes that his appearance in the Red Star T-shirt will not cause problems at the club and that the fans do not take offense. Young striker of Spartak apparently misjudged the reaction of the fans. Despite the efforts of the club to calm the supporters, and the fact that Despotović had scored a goal in the match against Red Star, a big part of the fans was still angry on the attacker. During the ensuing championship match against Partizan Belgrade almost every one of his ball contacts was followed by a chorus of whistles. He was also offended by a banner. Despotović said later: "I did not insulted anyone and I can not just to give up the club where I spent eight years, the club they support my whole family. In Spartak I give my maximum, because I am a professional. And tomorrow, if I go, I will proudly say that I have played for the club as much as on Red Star". After that, the relations be normalized again.

== Friendships ==
The Marinci are in a brotherhood with the organized fan groups of Radnički Niš, the Meraklije. The friendship between the Meraklije and Marinci dates back to 1994, when Spartak and Radnički played for the entering into the Yugoslav Cup final. The supporters of these clubs used the opportunity to celebrate the 20th anniversary of his fraternity by cheering together at the same stand during the first football match between the two clubs in the 2012–13 Serbian SuperLiga season.
