= Ivan Budinčević =

Yugoslav footballer

Personal information
- Full name: Ivan Budinčević
- Date of birth: 7 July 1955 (age 71)
- Place of birth: Subotica, PR Serbia, FPR Yugoslavia
- Position: Goalkeeper

Team information
- Current team: Bačka Subotica (Goalkeeper coach)

Youth career
- Bačka Subotica

Senior career*
Years	Team	Apps	(Gls)
1972–1973	Bačka Subotica		
1973–1976	Spartak Subotica		
1976–1980	Hajduk Split	44	(0)
1980–1983	Olimpija Ljubljana	48	(0)
1983–1988	Dinamo Vinkovci	97	(0)
1991–	Obilić Novi Kneževac		
- Radnički Bajmok
- Zorka Subotica
–2000	Aleksa Šantić		

Managerial career
- Bačka Subotica (Gk coach)
- * Club domestic league appearances and goals

Ivan Budinčević (Serbian Cyrillic: Иван Будинчевић; born 7 July 1955) is a Yugoslav retired football goalkeeper most remembered for his professional spell with Hajduk Split.

== Playing career ==
He began his career in his home city with the Bačka Subotica and continued with the biggest local club Spartak, where he attracted the attention of the media and of the leading Yugoslav clubs, so he went to Hajduk Split. At the beginning he was a substitute to Ivan Katalinić, but later he became the first choice keeper, winning the title in the season 1978–79.

After Hajduk, he was playing with NK Olimpija Ljubljana and Dinamo Vinkovci until a life-threatening injury suffered during a game has interrupted his career at the age 33. However, three years later, the economic hardship and a need to make a living for his family has forced him to resume the goal-keeping, so he played with low-level clubs in Northern Serbia until age of 45.

After retiring, he became the goalkeeper coach in his first club Bačka. He was also the administrator of the "Croats of Serbia" team at the 2016 EUROPEADA games.

== Coaching career ==
At the second "European Championship of the Croatian Minorities" held in Split 2009, he was the manager of the team of the Croatian Minority in Vojvodina, gaining the third place. He was also technical director of the team at Europeada 2012 (The Football Tournament of the Autochthonous National Minorities in Europe), held in Upper Lusatia, Germany (16–24 June 2012), where they also have reached the third place.

== Honours ==
Hajduk Split

- Yugoslav First League: 1978–79
