= Meraklije =

Association football club fans

Meraklije - Мераклије
- Nickname: Juznjaci (The Southern) Južnoprugaši (Members of the Southern Track)
- Abbreviation: M89
- Founded: September 1989
- Type: Supporters' group, Ultras group
- Team: Radnički Niš
- Motto: If you are a Nišlija, be a Meraklija!
- Headquarters: Niš, Serbia
- Arenas: Čair Stadium, Čair Sports Center
- Stand: South
- Coordinates: 43°18′55.90″N 21°54′30.72″E
- Website: Meraklije.com

Meraklije (Serbian Cyrillic: Мераклије) are the organized supporters of the Niš professional football club Radnički Niš, and are one of the major supporter groups in Serbia. Meraklije is plural of the singular form meraklija, which means something like "neko kome je sve po meri, neko ko uživa u nečemu", which roughly translates to "someone to just everything is right, someone who enjoys something"; a person in this state is called a meraklija. Besides the football club, they also support other sport sections in Niš. They are also known for their special support to the Serbian national handball team.

== History ==
=== The rise in the 1960s ===
The first large organized support happened in 1962 against Vardar, where several thousand fans from Niš occupied Skoplje. In 1962, Radnički Niš were promoted to the Yugoslav First League for the first time in their history and attracted thereby more supporters from Niš and its surroundings. Already on 23 September 1962, the fans displayed their first big choreography on the first league match against Red Star Belgrade. On the eastern stand has emerged a transparent "Real sa Nišave", which translates to "Real from Nisava", which a length of 20 meters and a height of 2 meters. The transparent could be seen at every home game throughout the 60s. Since Radnički's entry to the Yugoslav First League, the stadium was well attended.

=== 1980s and the establishment ===
Legendary is the support beginning of the 80s, in the Yugoslav First League (season 1979-80 and 1980-81) and during the UEFA Cup from 1980–1983, with great atmosphere and cheering. Radnički Niš played 22 games across Europe against teams like S.S.C. Napoli, Dundee United, Grasshoppers Zürich, Feyenoord Rotterdam and other clubs. During this time, Radnički Niš lost in three years only one UEFA Cup home match of total 11 and this against a Yugoslavian team. A great contribution to this success had the Radnički Niš fans with their support. Their support includes the use of large and small flags, chanting and different sound elements. The Čair Stadium was a tough ground for the opposition and the atmosphere created by Radnički Niš fans in a cracking stadium always gave hope to the team that they could overcome anybody. They achieved even the semifinals of UEFA Cup in 1982. In the first leg Radnički Niš won against Hamburger SV in front of 38,500 enthusiastic Radnički fans with 2-1, but they clearly lost the second leg. Radnički Niš fans attracted in this period for the first time also throughout Europe attention. Also legendary were the victory celebrations accompanied by Gajde, a traditional instrument that is typical for the region. After these great years, Radnički Niš relegated in 1984 in the Yugoslav Second League. A large organized support, after 1984, even with excellent attendance statistics, has been absent until 1989. That year in September, three days before the championship match against Red Star Belgrade, a decision was made that the club should have an organized fan group and that it should be shoulder-to-shoulder with the other fan organizations in Yugoslavia. There were several suggestions for a name, but the name Meraklije was chosen after a one-sided decision, as the group's name, mainly due to traditional reasons from the city of Niš. The name was originally proposed by Caci, a former well-known supporter. Meraklije is plural of the singular form Meraklija, which means something like "neko kome je sve po meri, neko ko uživa u nečemu", which roughly translates to "someone to just everything is right, someone who enjoys something". A person in this state are called a Meraklija. After a short time, the Meraklije had over 2000 members.

=== 1990s ===
With the decay of Yugoslavia during the war (1992–1995), the inflation and the UN sanctions, gathered clearly fewer Meraklije. This occurrences affected the state and its population and sport. The next generation of Meraklije made their appearance at Čair's stands in 1995. Since that day, the Meraklije are gaining more adepts and are becoming more active in the club's operations. Already then, they are often refreshed by new, younger fans. When the competition started in 1996, Radnički Niš was playing in the second league, but the Meraklije went to all games across Serbia. Time spent in the second league was short and the club's promotion to the first league meant that fans came in bigger numbers in the following seasons. The promotion brought younger fans to the stadium, as the Meraklije continued to grow, it offered new jerseys and scarves to its members. In 1999-00, the Meraklije reach their climax. After ten years of cooperation and living life together, Meraklije get their own center in the city, and no game is left unattended.

== Characteristics ==
The Meraklije are viewed as one of the most loyal followers in Serbia. Through thick and thin, they were regularly at the stadium, supporting their team. The logo of the Meraklije includes the colors red and white, which are also the colors of the club, the logo of Radnički Niš with the Niš Fortress and the flag of Serbia. The group's traditional colors are therefore mostly red in combination with blue and white, which may differ from the official team equipment worn on match days. In addition to the acoustic support, like chanting and singing, which is often coordinated by a so-called "Vodja" (Serbian: leader) by a megaphone or microphone and accompanied by drums, the Meraklije put also emphasis on visual aids, such as waving large or small flags, displaying of banners and the creation of colorful choreographies, with many other activities along the way.

== Friendships ==
The Meraklije are in a brotherhood with the organized fan groups of Spartak Subotica, the Marinci, and the Varvari who support Budućnost Podgorica from Montenegro. The friendship between the Meraklije and Marinci dates back to 1994, when Spartak and Radnički Niš played for the entering into the cup final. The Meraklije and the Marinci used the opportunity to celebrate the 20th anniversary of his fraternity by cheering together at the same stand during the first football match between their clubs in the 2012–13 Serbian SuperLiga season. The friendship between the Meraklije and the Varvari started during a game where the Meraklije were especially hospitable. They gave the Varvari catering, lodging and support in every way, of course the Varvari have not forgotten this exemplary behavior. Also, the historical and cultural closeness of Serbia and Montenegro, known as brother nations, has contributed much to the brotherhood. Recently also started good relations with the fans of Radnički Kragujevac, the Crveni Đavoli. Their relations began mainly through the mutual support of the growing local patriotism in the last years of the Serbian fan scene. To the two clubs can be drawn various parallel. The clubs connects next to the club name also the founding years of the two clubs in 1923. Also both supporter groups were founded in the same year, in 1989. The name Radnički means "Labourers'" in Serbian and its roots come from the relation with the Labour movement that the clubs had during the first half of the 20th century. Their often mentioned slogan is: "Radnička deca, radnička braća", which translates to "Workers children, workers brothers". All reasons, why the first top tier match between these clubs ended during the 2012–13 season especially in a respectful and peaceful atmosphere for each other, although they not played against each other for a long time.

== Meraklije today ==
During the era of Yugoslavia the Meraklije placed a high value on local patriotism. They continue to do so today. Following the club's promotion to the Serbian Superliga, support has grown, with increasing numbers of younger supporters from Niš and Nišava District accepting Radnički Niš as their only club. The number of members rose and subgroups were founded.

The Meraklije gather in the south stand of the stadium. The group has produced props, flags, banners, shirts, and scarves, many bearing slogans such as : "Nemoj da budeš stranac u svom gradu, oboji grad bojama svog kluba. Budi i ti Meraklija", which roughly translates to "Don't be a stranger in your own city, colour the town with your club's colours. Be a Meraklija." or "Gradska deca uz gradski klub" which roughly means "Children of the City, for the club of their city".

The group states that its aims are to restore the club's prominence of the early 1980s, to encourage local patriotism, to grow in size and organisation, and to create a lively atmosphere at Radnički's matches.
