= Nemanja Nikolić (footballer, born 1988) =

Montenegrin footballer

Nemanja Nikolić Немања Николић
- Nikolić with Montenegro in 2015

Personal information
- Date of birth: 1 January 1988 (age 38)
- Place of birth: Valjevo, SR Serbia, Yugoslavia
- Height: 1.84 m (6 ft 1/2 in)
- Position: Midfielder

Youth career
- Budućnost Valjevo
- Red Star Belgrade

Senior career*
Years	Team	Apps	(Gls)
2006–2011	Red Star Belgrade	25	(0)
2006–2007	→ Zlatibor Voda (loan)	26	(2)
2007–2008	→ Grbalj (loan)	26	(1)
2010–2011	→ Spartak Subotica (loan)	22	(3)
2011–2013	OFK Beograd	54	(5)
2013–2015	Dinamo Minsk	53	(4)
2015	BATE Borisov	10	(1)
2016	Hapoel Tel Aviv	17	(3)
2017	Voždovac	14	(2)
2017–2018	Hapoel Ra'anana	34	(0)
2019	Minsk	9	(0)
2019–2020	Voždovac	25	(7)
2020–2021	Tuzla City	14	(0)
2021	Grafičar Beograd	11	(0)
2021–2024	Kolubara	88	(2)
Total		428	(30)

International career
2008–2011	Montenegro U21	11	(1)
2009–2016	Montenegro	12	(0)
- * Club domestic league appearances and goals as of 31 May 2024

Nemanja Nikolić (Montenegrin Cyrillic: Немања Николић, pronounced [němaɲa nǐkolitɕ]; born 1 January 1988) is a Montenegrin professional footballer who plays as a midfielder for Serbian club Kolubara.

== Club career ==
Born in Valjevo, Nikolić began playing in the youth teams of Red Star Belgrade. His debut as a senior happened in 2006 when he played on loan with Zlatibor Voda in the Serbian League Vojvodina. In the following season, he moved to Montenegro where he represented Grbalj in the Montenegrin First League.

In the summer of 2008, Nikolić returned and joined the first team of Red Star Belgrade, making his debut in the 2008–09 Serbian SuperLiga season. After playing two seasons with Red Star, in the summer of 2010, he was sent a loan to another SuperLiga side, Spartak Subotica. At the end of the season, he left Red Star and joined OFK Beograd.

After OFK Beograd, Nikolić played in the Belarusian Premier League with Dinamo Minsk and BATE Borisov and later on Minsk. He also played for Israeli Premier League clubs Hapoel Tel Aviv and Hapoel Ra'anana and Serbian SuperLiga club Voždovac on two occasions.

On 30 July 2020, Nikolić signed a two-year contract with Bosnian Premier League club Tuzla City. He made his official debut for the club in a league game against Olimpik on 23 August 2020. Nikolić left Tuzla City in January 2021, after terminating his contract with the club.

== International career ==
Nikolić represented the Montenegrin U21 national team, before debuting for the senior team in 2009. He made his senior debut for Montenegro in an August 2009 friendly match against Wales and has earned a total of 12 caps, scoring no goals. His final international was an October 2016 FIFA World Cup qualification match against Kazakhstan.

== Honours ==
Red Star Belgrade

- Serbian Cup: 2009–10

BATE Borisov

- Belarusian Premier League: 2015
