= Szabados =

Szabados is a Hungarian surname.

Origin: Status name for a freedman (an emancipated serf) from szabados 'liberated' from szabad 'free'.

Notable people with this surname include:

- Attila Szabados, Serbian-Hungarian football player
- Béla Szabados (composer), Hungarian composer
- Béla Szabados (swimmer), Hungarian swimmer
- Eugenio Szabados, Hungarian–Italian chess master
- György Szabados, Hungarian pianist
- László Szabados, Hungarian swimmer
- Miklós Szabados, Hungarian table tennis player
- Shannon Szabados, Canadian ice hockey player
