= Aleksandar Kopunović =

Croatian footballer

Personal information
- Full name: Aleksandar Kopunović
- Date of birth: 29 February 1976 (age 50)
- Place of birth: Subotica, SR Serbia, SFR Yugoslavia
- Height: 1.87 m (6 ft 1 1/2 in)
- Position: Striker

Team information
- Current team: Bačka 1901 (manager)

Senior career*
Years	Team	Apps	(Gls)
1994–2000	Spartak Subotica		
2000–2001	Mura	25	(3)
2001–2005	Kamen Ingrad	81	(11)
2005	Guangzhou Rizhiquan	12	(8)
2006–2007	Mladost Apatin	19	(5)
2008	Kecskemét	11	(3)
2008	Hrvatski Dragovoljac	7	(2)
2009	Petrovac	14	(3)
2009	Anagennisi Epanomi		
2010	Kastoria		
2010–2014	Tisa Adorjan		
2014–2015	Bačka 1901	0	(0)

Managerial career
- 2015–2023: Spartak Subotica (youth)
- 2024–: Bačka 1901
- * Club domestic league appearances and goals

Aleksandar Kopunović (Serbian Cyrillic: Александар Копуновић, born 29 February 1976) is a Serbian football manager and former striker.

== Playing career ==
=== Club ===
Born in Subotica, SR Serbia, then still part of Yugoslavia, Kopunović started his playing career with his hometown club Spartak Subotica. He then moved abroad to Mura in Slovenia. Between 2001 and 2005, Kopunović played for Kamen Ingrad in Croatia. He also played professionally in China, Hungary, and Greece, and in the summer of 2014, he joined FK Bačka 1901, the oldest club in Serbia, playing in the Serbian League Vojvodina.

At the start of the 1994/95 season, he joined FK Bačka 1901 and played with them in the Second League of FR Yugoslavia group North. In that same club, he finished his playing career in the 2014–15 season playing in the Serbian League Vojvodina. Before that, he had also played with Spartak Subotica, Mura, Kamen Ingrad, Guangzhou Rizhiquan, Mladost Apatin, Kecskemét, Hrvatski Dragovoljac, OFK Petrovac, Anagennisi Epanomi, Kastoria, and Tisa Adorjan.

== Managerial career ==
In the summer of 2015, he finished his playing career and became one of the managers of the youth teams of FK Spartak Subotica.

== Career statistics ==
Club	Season	League	
Club	Season	Apps	Goals
Spartak Subotica	1998–99	22	5
Spartak Subotica	1999–00	18	2
Mladost Apatin	2006–07	19	5
