= Andrija Perčić =

Croatian football manager and player

Personal information
- Date of birth: 12 October 1942
- Place of birth: Subotica, Kingdom of Hungary (now Serbia)
- Date of death: 7 February 2017 (aged 74)
- Place of death: Rijeka, Croatia
- Position: Forward

Senior career*
Years	Team	Apps	(Gls)
1960–1962	FD Zvezda		
1962–1963	Spartak Subotica		
1964–1972	Rijeka		
1972–1973	Mendrisiostar		

Managerial career
- 1984–1985: Mendrisiostar
- 1989: Spartak Subotica
- 1991–1995: Deportes Antofagasta
- 1995–1999: Huachipato
- 2007: Coquimbo Unido
- * Club domestic league appearances and goals

Andrija Perčić (12 October 1942 – 7 February 2017) was a Croatian football manager and footballer.

== Career ==
Born in Subotica, Perčić played for FD Zvezda Spartak Subotica and NK Rijeka in his homeland and the Swiss club Mendrisiostar.

As a football coach, Perčić stated he was part of the training of players such as Zvonimir Boban, Robert Prosinečki, Alen Bokšić, Robert Jarni and Dejan Savićević. In 1989–90, he led Spartak Subotica.

As a manager, Perčić stood out in the Chilean Primera División. He came to Chile in 1991 thanks to his compatriot Mirko Jozić, then the manager of Colo-Colo, and signed with Deportes Antofagasta until 1995, reaching good seasons in 1992 and 1993. The next seasons, he was with Huachipato until 1999.

After many years without managing, Perčić assumed as manager of Coquimbo Unido in 2007.

== Personal life ==
Perčić wrote at least five books.

Following Coquimbo Unido, Perčić returned to Croatia and died in Rijeka on 7 February 2017.
