= Olga Jevrić =

Serbian sculptor

- Born: 29 September 1922; Belgrade, Serbia
- Died: 10 February 2014 (aged 91); Belgrade, Serbia

Olga Jevrić (29 September 1922 – 10 February 2014) was a Serbian sculptor.

== Biography ==
Olga Jevrić was born in Belgrade in 1922. In 1941 she graduated from high school, but initially failed the entrance exam to study in the Sculpture department of the Academy of Fine Arts. The following year, she successfully enrolled both in the Academy of Fine Arts, and the Academy of Music in Belgrade.

In 1948 Jevrić graduated from the sculpture department of AFA, in the class of Professor Sreten Stojanović. She got an M.A. degree in 1949 (special course) in the class of the aforementioned teacher. She also studied art history in Belgrade.

She was accepted as a member of Serbian Academy of Sciences and Arts (SASA) in 1974.

Her first exhibition was in 1948, and from that time on has been included in and the subject of many exhibitions both at home and abroad. Jevrić represented Yugoslavia at the 1958 Venice Biennale and spent a year in America on a Ford Foundation Fellowship in 1966. She was the recipient of numerous honors.

Jevrić was the first new donor to the Belgrade Heritage House. She signed a Gift Contract on 10 February 2006 and bequeathed 47 of her sculptures made in iron-oxide, iron, cement, terracotta and filmed plaster. The permanent exposition of her work includes small and medium scale sculptures created between 1956-1998.

Jevrić died on 10 February 2014 in Belgrade at the age of 91. An exhibition that included 28 of her sculptures was organized in London in 2019.

== See also ==
- List of Serbian painters
- Ana Bešlić
- Marija Vuković
