= Šeparović =

Šeparović is a Croatian surname.

It is the third most common surname in the Dubrovnik-Neretva County of Croatia.

It may refer to:

- Frances Separovic, Croatian-born Australian biophysical chemist
- Ivo Šeparović, Croatian international footballer
- Miroslav Šeparović, Croatian lawyer
- Zvonimir Šeparović, Croatian legal scholar and politician
