= Football in Yugoslavia =

- Country: Jugoslavija
- Governing body: Football Association of Yugoslavia
- National team: Yugoslavia national football team
- First played: 1873; 153 years ago

National competitions
- Yugoslav Cup

Club competitions
- First League; Second League

International competitions
- European Cup; Cup Winners' Cup; UEFA Cup; Super Cup; Intercontinental Cup; FIFA World Cup (national team); UEFA European Championship (national team)

Football in Yugoslavia had different levels of historical development depending on the geographical regions. Following the extreme popularity of the sport in Central Europe, it soon became the most popular sport in the territories of Yugoslavia as well.

== History ==
Football came to the region in the time of Austria-Hungary in the late 19th century, mostly with influences from Vienna, Budapest and Prague, but also England, and the region's first football match was played in Rijeka in 1873, between English and local railway engineers. Before the end of the century occasional matches were also played in Županja, Zadar, Zrenjanin, Subotica, Maribor, Zagreb and Belgrade. Football was first introduced in several multi-sport gymnastic societies, and the first club was established in Belgrade in 1899. In 1901, Bačka, the oldest still-existing football club in Yugoslavia, was founded in Subotica, where the first league competition started in 1908. Before World War I, organized competitions were also played in the territories of today's Croatia and Slovenia. On 13 June 1912, the football section of the Croatian Sports Federation was established as a forerunner of the Yugoslav Football Federation.

After World War I, the Kingdom of Serbs, Croats and Slovenes, later renamed the Kingdom of Yugoslavia in 1929, was formed, and territories with mixed sports development were united. The Yugoslav Football Federation was formed in Zagreb in 1919, while the first sub-associations were formed in Belgrade, Ljubljana, Split, Subotica and Sarajevo in 1920. The Yugoslav Football Championship was played beginning in 1923, when Građanski Zagreb became first champions. The first four seasons had a cup tournament format, while the first round-robin league competition was held in 1927. In the period from 1923 to 1940, seventeen seasons were completed, with all the titles won by clubs from Croatia (Građanski Zagreb, Concordia Zagreb, HAŠK Zagreb and Hajduk Split) or Serbia (BSK Belgrade and Jugoslavija Belgrade). The Yugoslavia national football team was formed in 1920, when it participated at the Summer Olympics in Belgium. It soon became a force in European football and finished third in the 1930 World Cup in Uruguay.

== Domestic Football ==
The monarchy was replaced by a socialist country after the Second World War. Many new clubs were formed and a new federal league was established to replace the old championship. The first season was played in 1946/47, and Partizan became the first postwar champions. The Yugoslav league soon became the most popular sport league in the country with average attendances usually over 10,000 spectators. The most successful clubs were known as the big four, Dinamo Zagreb, Hajduk Split, Red Star Belgrade, and Partizan Belgrade. Red Star won a record 19 championships and the European Cup in 1991; Partizan were runners-up of the same competition in 1966, while Dinamo won the Inter-Cities Fairs Cup in 1967. Other notable Yugoslav clubs were Olimpija Ljubljana, Željezničar Sarajevo, Velež Mostar, OFK Beograd, Vardar Skopje, Vojvodina, Rijeka and Sarajevo. Apart from the league, the Yugoslav Cup was also very popular, with the winner getting the Marshal Tito Trophy. The finals were first played on Republic Day (29 November), but the competition was then altered to correspond to the league season. The most successful team was Red Star with 12 titles. The Yugoslavia national football team continued with good results on the international scene, being participants in many European Championships and World Cups.

== National football team ==
Stjepan Bobek scored the most goals for the national team, while Dragan Džajić earned the most caps. The national team's best results were reaching the semi-finals in the 1962 World Cup and the finals in UEFA Euro 1960 and UEFA Euro 1968. Yugoslavia also hosted the UEFA Euro 1976 in the cities of Belgrade and Zagreb.

In 1992, all the competitions were dissolved or altered following the Breakup of Yugoslavia and the consequent creation of independent states.

== Stadiums ==
| # | Stadium | Capacity | Opened | Location | Home team |
|---|---|---|---|---|---|
| 1 | Stadion Crvena Zvezda | 105,000 | 1963 | Beograd | FK Crvena Zvezda |
| 2 | Stadion Maksimir | 65,000 | 1912 | Zagreb | NK Dinamo Zagreb |
| 3 | Stadion JNA | 55,000 | 1949 | Beograd | FK Partizan |
| 3 | Stadion Poljud | 55,000 | 1979 | Split | NK Hajduk Split |
| 3 | Stadion Koševo | 55,000 | 1947 | Sarajevo | FK Sarajevo |
| 6 | Stadion Karađorđev park | 33,000 | 1953 | Zrenjanin | FK Proleter Zrenjanin |
| 7 | Gradski stadion Banja Luka | 30,000 | 1937 | Banja Luka | FK Borac Banja Luka |
| 7 | Stadion Gradski vrt | 30,000 | 1958 | Osijek | NK Osijek |
| 7 | Stadion Grbavica | 30,000 | 1953 | Sarajevo | FK Željezničar Sarajevo |
| 10 | Gradski stadion Subotica | 28,000 | 1936 | Subotica | FK Spartak Subotica |
| 11 | Omladinski Stadium | 26,000 | 1957 | Beograd | OFK Beograd |
| 12 | Gradski stadion Priština | 25,000 | 1953 | Priština | FK Priština |
| 13 | Stadion Čair | 25,000 | 1963 | Niš | FK Radnički Niš |
| 14 | Stadion Mladost | 25,000 | 1976 | Kruševac | FK Napredak Kruševac |
| 15 | Stadion Šumarice | 24,000 | 1957 | Kragujevac | FK Radnički Kragujevac |
| 16 | Stadion Bilino Polje | 23,000 | 1972 | Zenica | NK Čelik |
| 17 | Stadion Gradski park | 23,000 | 1947 | Skopje | FK Vardar |
| 18 | Gradski stadion Novi Sad | 22,000 | 1924 | Novi Sad | FK Vojvodina |
| 19 | Stadion Bijeli Brijeg | 22,000 | 1971 | Mostar | FK Velež |
| 20 | Stadion Kantrida | 22,000 | 1912 | Rijeka | NK Rijeka |
| 21 | Stadion Bežigrad | 20,000 | 1935 | Ljubljana | NK Olimpija Ljubljana |
| 22 | Stadion Pod Goricom | 20,000 | 1945 | Titograd | FK Budućnost Podgorica |
| 23 | Stadion Ljudski vrt | 20,000 | 1952 | Maribor | NK Maribor |
| 24 | Stadion Jaklić | 20,000 | 1984 | Bugojno | NK Iskra Bugojno |
| 25 | Stadion Mladost | 18,000 | 1966 | Vinkovci | NK Dinamo Vinkovci |
| 26 | Stadion kraj Bistrice | 15,000 | 1946 | Nikšić | FK Sutjeska Nikšić |
| 27 | Stadion kraj Ibra | 15,000 | 1979 | Titova Mitrovica | FK Trepča |
| 28 | Stadion Kranjčevićeva | 15,000 | 1921 | Zagreb | NK Zagreb |
| 29 | Gradski stadion Tetovo | 15,000 | 1981 | Tetovo | FK Teteks |
| 30 | Stadion Tušanj | 14,000 | 1957 | Tuzla | FK Sloboda Tuzla |
| 31 | Stadion Banjica | 13,000 | 1977 | Beograd | FK Rad |

== See also ==
For the correspondent article on each one of the republics, please see:

- Football in Bosnia and Herzegovina
- Football in Croatia
- Football in Montenegro
- Football in North Macedonia
- Football in Serbia
- Football in Slovenia

Others:

- Football Association of Yugoslavia
- Yugoslav First League
- Yugoslavia national football team
