= Zoran Milidrag =

Bosnian-Herzegovinian football manager and former player

Personal information
- Date of birth: 29 February 1960 (age 66)
- Place of birth: Sarajevo, SFR Yugoslavia
- Position: Midfielder

Team information
- Current team: FK Bačka 1901 (coach)

Senior career*
| Years | Team | Apps | (Gls) |
| 1978–1980 | Famos Hrasnica | 8 | (0) |
| 1983–1989 | Čelik Zenica | | |
- Bačka 1901
| 1993–1995 | Spartak Subotica | 30 | (1) |
- Sartid

Managerial career
- 2009-2010: Spartak Subotica (assistant)
- 2011: Bačka Topola
- 2011-2012: Radnički Bajmok
- 2012: Bačka 1901
- 2013-2014: Tisa Adorjan
- 2016-: Bačka 1901 (assistant)
- * Club domestic league appearances and goals

Zoran Milidrag (Serbian Cyrillic: Зоран Милидраг; born 29 February 1960) is a Bosnian-Herzegovinian football manager and former player.

== Playing career ==
During his playing career he played as midfielder for FK Famos Hrasnica, NK Čelik Zenica, FK Bačka 1901 and Sartid Smederevo. He also played with FK Spartak Subotica during the mid-1990s.

== Managerial career ==
After retiring he became a football manager. He was an assistant coach of FK Spartak Subotica during the 2009-10 season. He coached FK Bačka Topola in the Serbian League Vojvodina during 2011. He was the coach of FK Radnički Bajmok before being appointed as the new head coach of FK Bačka 1901 on 9 April 2012.
