= Josip Zemko =

Yugoslav footballer and manager

Personal information
- Date of birth: 13 March 1946
- Place of birth: Subotica, PR Serbia, FPR Yugoslavia
- Date of death: 11 April 2017 (aged 71)
- Place of death: Subotica, Serbia
- Height: 1.78 m (5 ft 10 in)
- Position: Defender

Senior career*
Years	Team	Apps	(Gls)
1959–1962	Zvezda Subotica		
1962–1963	Spartak Subotica		
1963–1966	Željezničar	66	(0)
1966–1972	Vojvodina	151	(2)
1972–1973	Majdanpek		
1973–1974	Bačka Subotica		

International career
1965	Yugoslavia	3	(0)

Managerial career
- 1974–1977: Bačka Subotica
- 1984: Spartak Subotica
- 1989: Spartak Subotica
- 1990: Spartak Subotica
- 2008: Bačka Subotica (youth)
- * Club domestic league appearances and goals

Josip Zemko (13 March 1946 — 11 April 2017) was a Yugoslav football manager and player.

== Club career ==
Zemko played a total of 74 matches for Željezničar.

== International career ==
He was one of the best Yugoslav defenders in the 1960s. In 1963, he started playing for the first team and very soon he became a candidate for the Yugoslavia national team. He had collected three caps before he broke a leg in 1966. He never managed to reach the same level of play he was showing before the injury.

Zemko made his debut for Yugoslavia in a September 1965 friendly match away against the Soviet Union and earned a total of 3 caps, scoring no goals. His final international was an October 1965 World Cup qualification match away against France.

== Managerial career ==
After having coached several clubs in Serbia, he was coaching youth teams at FK Bačka 1901.
