= Tomislav Sivić =

Serbian football manager and player

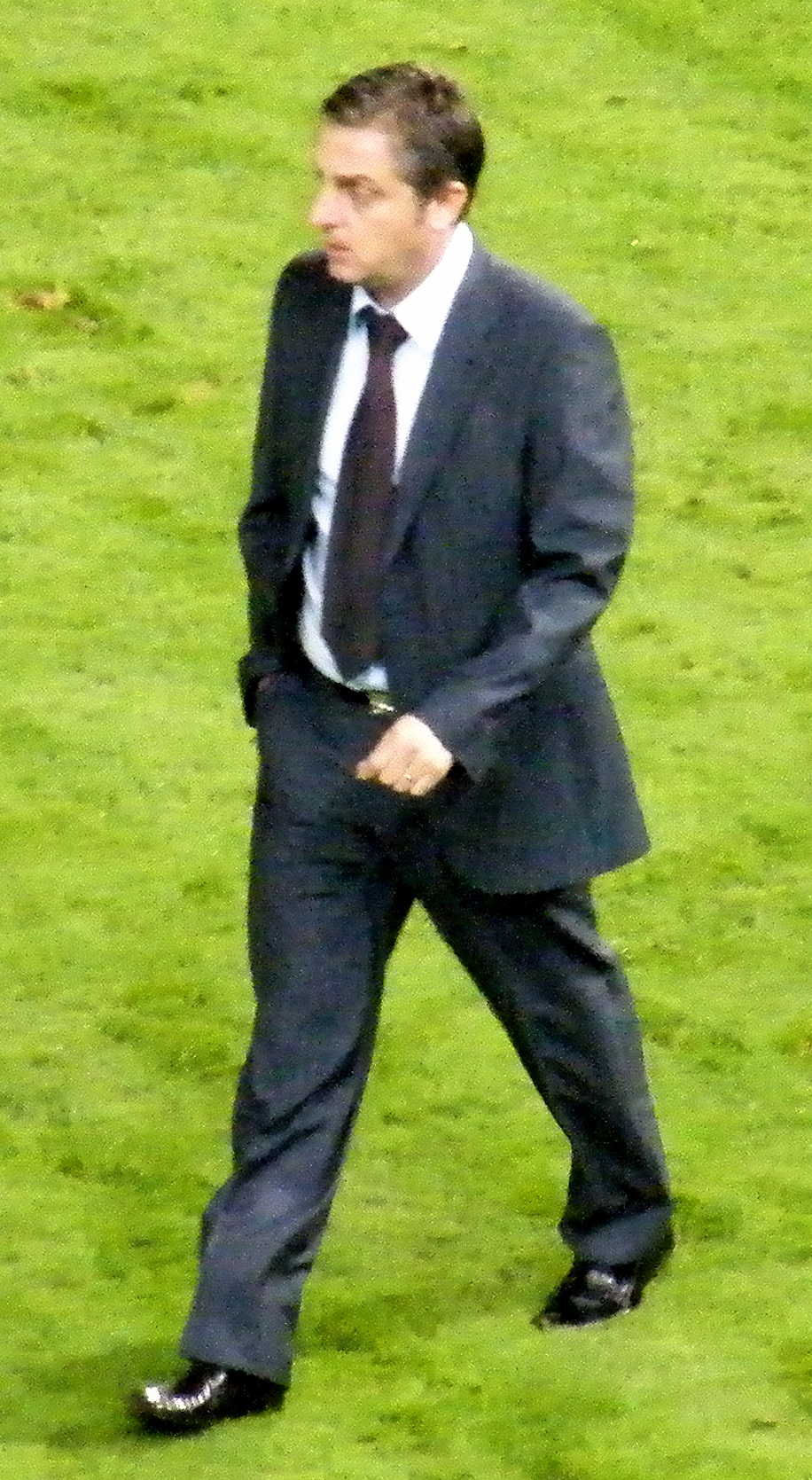
- Sivić in 2009

Personal information
- Full name: Tomislav Sivić
- Date of birth: 29 August 1966 (age 60)
- Place of birth: Subotica, SR Serbia, SFR Yugoslavia
- Height: 1.72 m (5 ft 8 in)
- Position: Midfielder

Youth career
- Spartak Subotica
- Red Star Belgrade

Senior career*
Years	Team	Apps	(Gls)
1988–1990	Bačka Subotica		
1990–1992	US Forbach		
1992–1993	Spartak Subotica	18	(1)
1994–1995	Kecskemét		
1995	HK	12	(3)
1996	VB	15	(4)
1997–1999	B36	35	(6)
2000–2001	KÍ	29	(3)
Total		109+	(17+)

Managerial career
- 1996: VB (player-manager)
- 1997–1999: B36 (player-manager)
- 1999: Spartak Subotica
- 2000–2001: KÍ (player-manager)
- 2004: Serbia and Montenegro U17
- 2004: Serbia and Montenegro U21 (caretaker)
- 2005: Smederevo
- 2006: Voždovac
- 2006–2007: Spartak Subotica
- 2007–2009: Kecskemét
- 2010: Serbia U19
- 2010: Serbia U21 (caretaker)
- 2010–2011: Kecskemét
- 2012: Hajduk Kula
- 2012–2013: Paks
- 2013–2015: Diósgyőr
- 2015–2016: Serbia U21
- 2016–2017: Mezőkövesd
- 2019: Paks
- 2020–2021: Tisa Adorjan
- 2022: Novi Pazar
- 2022: Radnički Niš
- 2022–2023: Železničar Pančevo
- 2023: Mladost Lučani
- 2023–2024: Mladost Lučani
- 2024: Železničar Pančevo
- 2024–2025: Novi Pazar
- 2025: Spartak Subotica
- 2025: Radnički Niš
- * Club domestic league appearances and goals

Tomislav Sivić (Serbian Cyrillic: Томислав Сивић; born 29 August 1966) is a Serbian football manager and former player.

== Playing career ==
Between 1988 and 1990, Sivić spent two seasons with Bačka Subotica in the Vojvodina League, the fourth tier of Yugoslav football. He would later play for Spartak Subotica during the 1992–93 First League of FR Yugoslavia.

In 1995, Sivić played for HK in Iceland. He subsequently moved to the Faroe Islands, serving as player-manager for several clubs.

== Managerial career ==
In January 2005, Sivić was appointed as manager of Smederevo. He resigned from his position in early November after three consecutive losses. In June 2006, Sivić took charge of Voždovac, but left the club after just two months due to poor results early in the season.

On 31 July 2015, Sivić was named as manager of the Serbia under-21s. He managed to qualify the team for the 2017 UEFA European Under-21 Championship via the play-offs. However, on 26 December 2016, it was announced that Sivić left his position due to "private reasons", only to take over as manager of Hungarian club Mezőkövesd the following day.

== Personal life ==
Sivić was born to a Bunjevac father and a Hungarian mother in Subotica, SFR Yugoslavia (present-day Serbia). He obtained Hungarian citizenship in 2012.

== Honours ==
Kecskemét

- Nemzeti Bajnokság II: 2007–08
- Magyar Kupa: 2010–11

Diósgyőr

- Ligakupa: 2013–14
