= Ivan Sarić =

Yugoslavian sportsman and aviator (1876–1966)

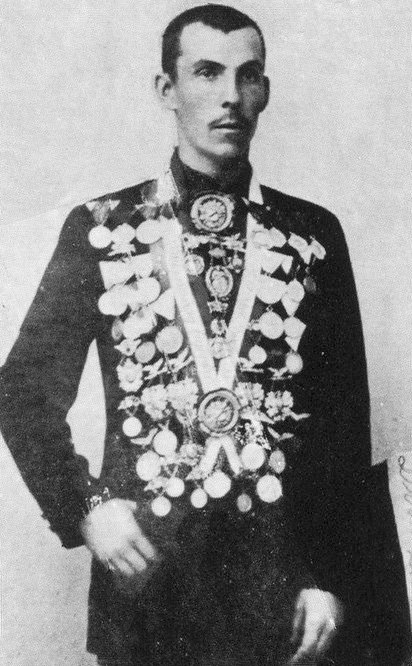
- Sarić with the medals won in sports competitions.
- Born: 27 June 1876; Szabadka, Kingdom of Hungary, Austria-Hungary
- Died: 23 August 1966 (aged 90); Subotica, SR Serbia, SFR Yugoslavia
- Occupation: Inventor
- Known for: monoplane

Ivan Sarić (27 June 1876 – 23 August 1966) was a Yugoslavian sportsman and aviator. He founded the athletic club ŽAK Subotica in his hometown of Subotica. He was also one of the most important pioneers of aviation in Eastern Europe. As a cyclist, he competed in and won many races throughout Europe. He lived and worked as a bookkeeper in his hometown.

== Life ==
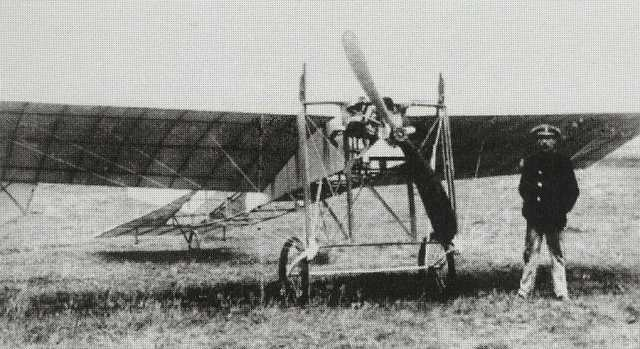
Ivan Sarić and his monoplane in 1910.

Ivan Sarić was born in Szabadka, then in Austria-Hungary, (today Subotica, Serbia) in a family of Bunjevci. While finishing Trade Academy in his native town, Sarić took to sports early – he was an athlete, wrestler and one of the founders of the local football club. He began cycling in 1891 and soon became one of the best cyclists in the Kingdom of Hungary, taking second place in the 1896 international race in Pécs. He became the champion of the Kingdom of Hungary on a 10-kilometer track in 1897 and then again a year later. In 1899 he won the 25-kilometer race that took place in Vienna and a 100-km race in Budapest. In 1910 he became the champion of Serbia in one-kilometer and 25-km races.

Sarić was also a football enthusiast. He was among the founders of the oldest club in Yugoslavia, FK Bačka 1901, and was its player as well.

While visiting Paris in 1909, Sarić met some of the French flight pioneers, including Louis Blériot, and saw the first planes and instantly became fascinated with the prospect of flying. Upon his return to Subotica, he immediately starting building his own aircraft. His first construction was made entirely from materials he had close at hand: wood, linens, motorcycle wheels and even piano strings. In early 1910, he completed his one-winged Sarić 1 aircraft by incorporating the 24-horsepower Delphos engine.

During the summer he experimented and practiced with his new machine, and then on 16 October 1910, in front of 7,000 of his fellow citizens, Sarić took to air successfully. In 1911 he built Sarić 2, an improved airplane with a more powerful motor of his own construction (50-horsepower). His further excursions into flying were stopped by the First World War but Sarić continued the work on the ground experimenting with a flying machine that could take off vertically—a sort of early helicopter with a motor of a double star shape. In tests, this machine showed very good results. Until the end of his life, he continued with his inventions and constructions and remained a sports promoter. He died in his home town of Subotica.

Aero-club in Subotica is named after Sarić, as well as the Airport Subotica, near Subotica. A reconstruction of his aircraft Sarić 1 is displayed in the Museum of Aviation in Belgrade.

== Gallery ==
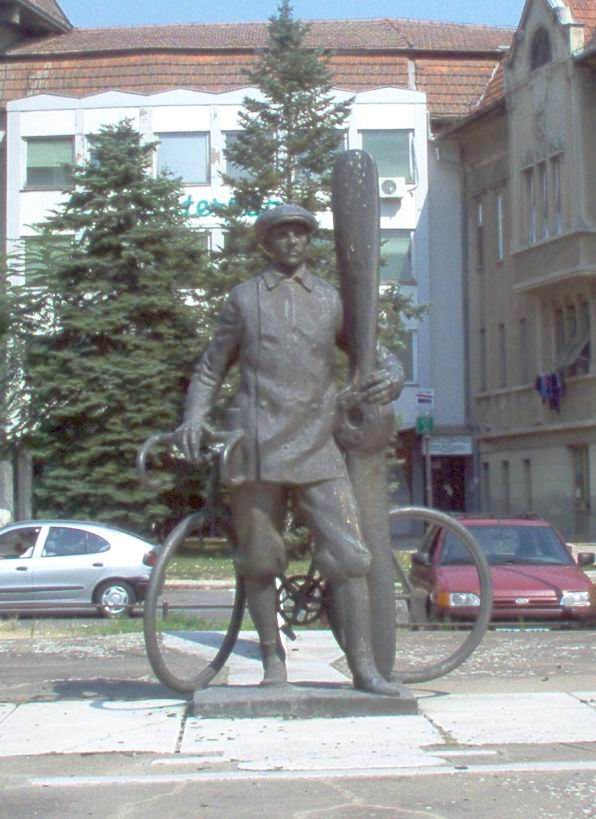
Monument to Ivan Sarić in Subotica

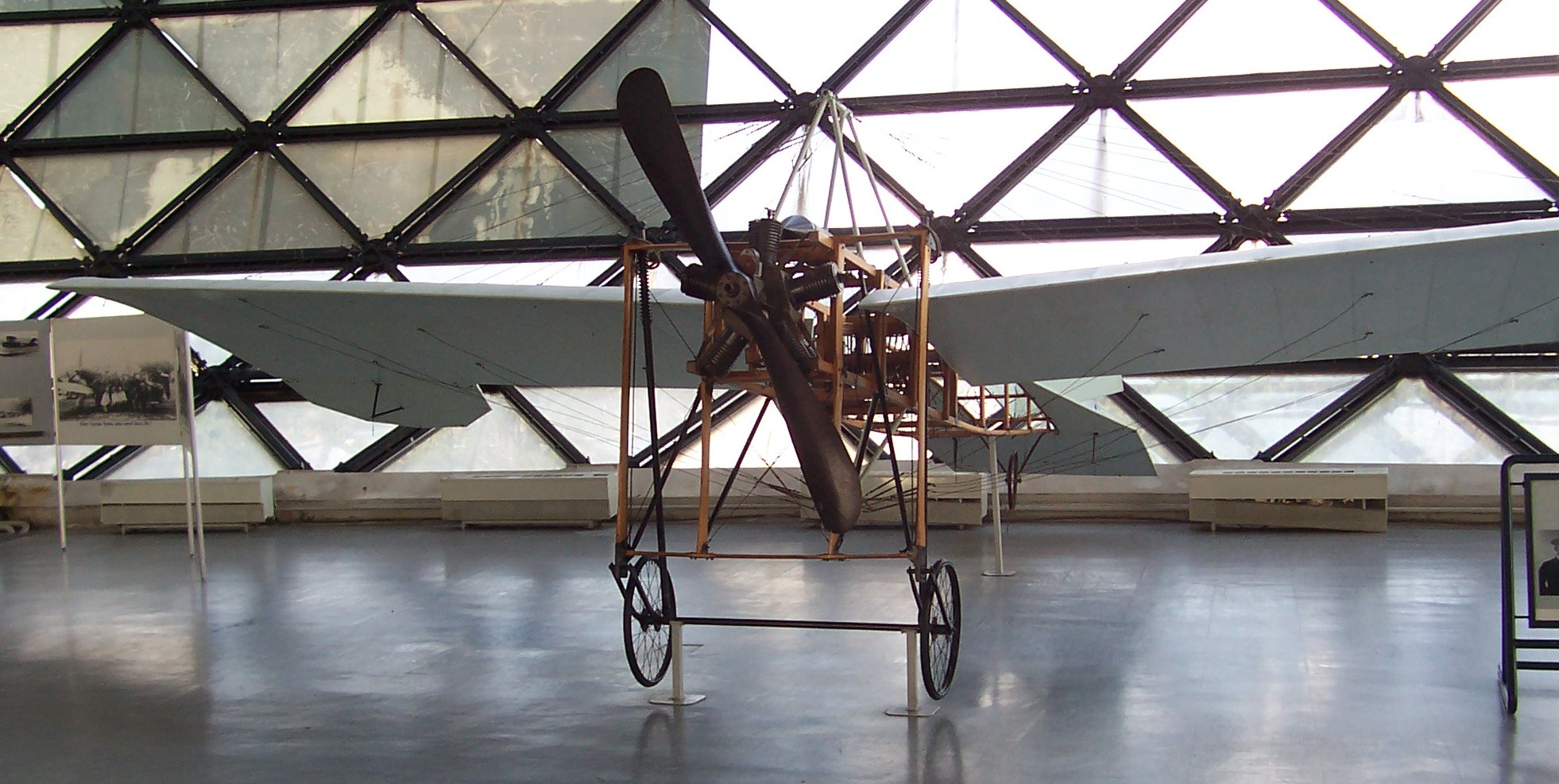
A reconstruction of his aircraft Sarić 1 in the Museum of Aviation in Belgrade.
