= Mustafa Peštalić =

Bosnian footballer and manager

Personal information
- Date of birth: 28 March 1963 (age 63)
- Place of birth: Brčko, SFR Yugoslavia
- Position: Goalkeeper

Senior career*
Years	Team	Apps	(Gls)
1980–1982	Lokomotiva Brčko		
1982–1984	Vojvodina	5	(0)
1984–1986	Spartak Subotica	36	(0)
1986–1988	Šibenik	56	(0)
1988–1990	Sloboda Tuzla	57	(0)
1990–1991	Velež Mostar	28	(0)
1991–1992	Estrela Amadora	13	(0)
1992–1994	Campomaiorense	34	(0)
1994–1995	União Lamas	10	(0)
1995–1997	Camacha		
1997–1999	Sing Tao		

Managerial career
- 2012: Spartak Subotica (GK coach)
- * Club domestic league appearances and goals

Mustafa Peštalić (born 28 March 1963) is a Bosnian football manager and former goalkeeper who played in several clubs in Yugoslavia, Portugal and Hong Kong.

== Playing career ==
=== Club ===
Born in Brčko, SR Bosnia and Herzegovina, back then still part of Yugoslavia, he started playing in local side FK Lokomotiva Brčko before moving to Yugoslav First League side FK Vojvodina in 1982. However, in two seasons he managed to make only 5 league appearances deciding then to move to Yugoslav Second League side FK Spartak Subotica where he became a regular. After 2 seasons in Subotica, he played another 2 with same level side HNK Šibenik, before moving in 1988 to FK Sloboda Tuzla making this way a return to the Yugoslav top-flight. After two seasons in Tuzla, he played with FK Velež Mostar before leaving Yugoslavia in 1991.

In summer 1991 he joined Portuguese side C.F. Estrela da Amadora, and for he next 6 years he will play in Portugal with S.C. Campomaiorense, C.F. União de Lamas and A.D. Camacha. He left Portugal in 1997 and joined Sing Tao SC playing in the Hong Kong Division 1 and stayed in the club until 1999 when the club was dissolved.

== Post-playing career ==
After retiring, he became a coach. By February 2012 he was a goalkeeping coach at FK Spartak Subotica in the Serbian SuperLiga. Afterwards, he became sports director of NK Zvijezda Gradačac (a club playing in the Bosnian Premier League, a post he held until April 2014.
