= Attila Szabados =

Serbian-Hungarian footballer

Attila Szabados (Hungarian: Szabados Attila, Serbian: Атила Сабадош / Atila Sabadoš; born 7 August 1973) is a retired Serbian-Hungarian footballer, who played in the Yugoslav First League (1989–93, 1994–95) and Hungarian First League (1993–94).

== Career ==
He started playing in FK Palić where his talent was spotted by Yugoslav First League club Spartak Subotica. He played there from 1989 until 1993 when he moved to Hungary to continue his career playing for Békéscsaba Előre, MTK Budapest, Diósgyőri VTK, Vasas SC, Pécsi Mecsek FC and Paksi SE. He played as a forward. In the 1994/95 season he played with FK Bačka 1901 in the Second League of FR Yugoslavia Group North.

== Personal life ==
Szabados was born in Subotica, SR Serbia, SFR Yugoslavia, and is of ethnic Hungarian descent.
