= Subotica Airfield =

Airfield in Subotica, Serbia

Subotica Airfield Bikovo Airfield
- IATA: none; ICAO: LYSU

Summary
- Airport type: Civil
- Operator: Flight Club "Ivan Sarić"
- Serves: Subotica, Serbia
- Location: Subotica
- Elevation AMSL: 355 ft (108 m)
- Coordinates: 46°01′22″N 19°42′21″E

Map
- Location within Serbia

Runways
| Direction | Length | | Surface |
| Direction | ft | m | Surface |
|---|---|---|---|
| 14/32 | 2,625 | 800 | Grass |

Subotica Airfield (Serbian: Аеродром Суботица / Aerodrom Subotica) (ICAO: LYSU), also locally known as Bikovo Airfield (Serbian: Аеродром Биково / Aerodrom Bikovo), is a recreational aerodrome near the city of Subotica, Serbia. It has one runway that is 800 m long and 30 m wide.

The airfield is mostly used for air sport with active Skydive Drop Zone, pilot school for Glider pilot license (SPL) and private pilot license (PPL) as well as pilot rating courses: Glider towing STR; Aerobatics ARB; Flight instructor FI and NVFR. The club members are very active in paragliding and power kite piloting.

Aeroklub Ivan Sarić is the operator of Subotica Aerodrome.

== Gallery ==
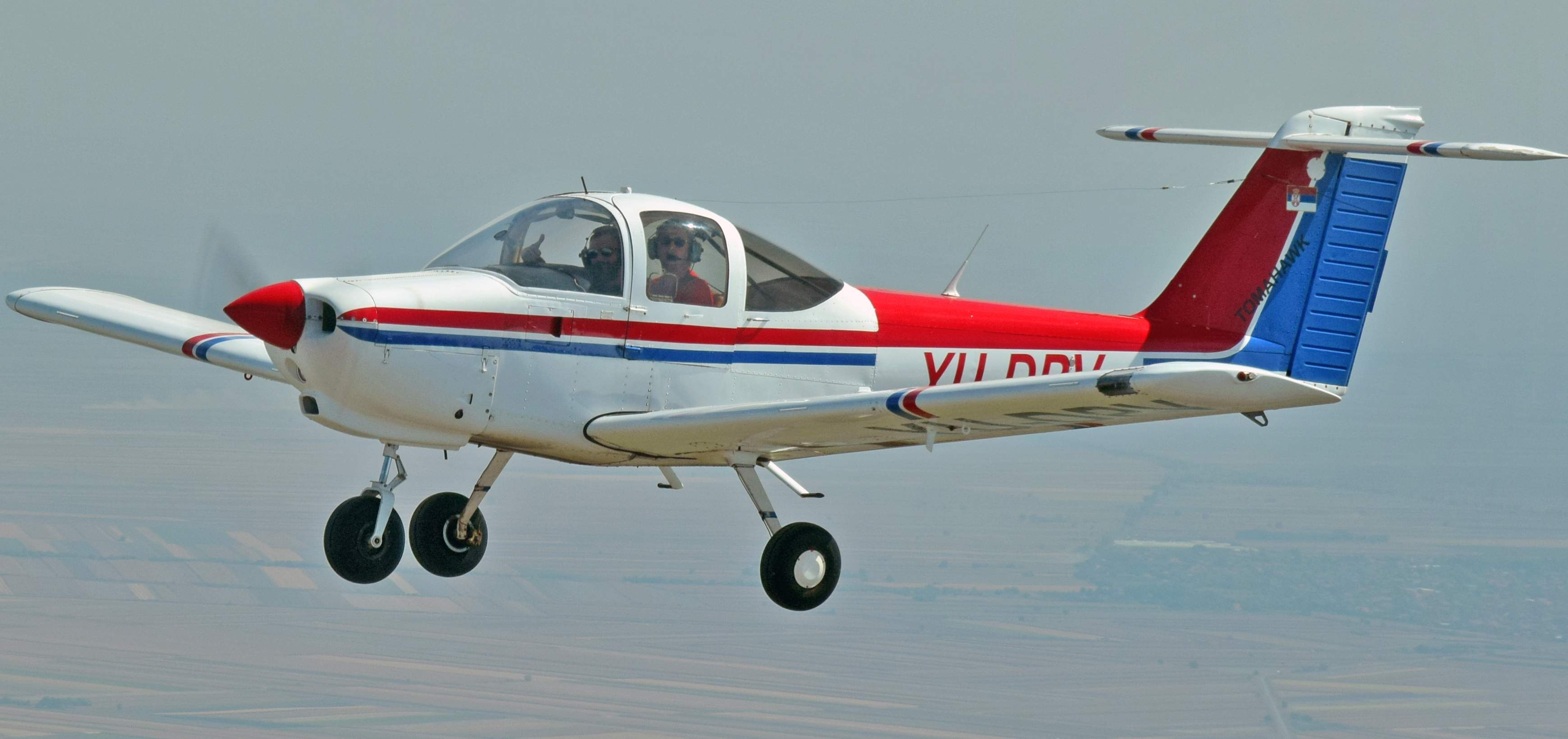
Pilot training

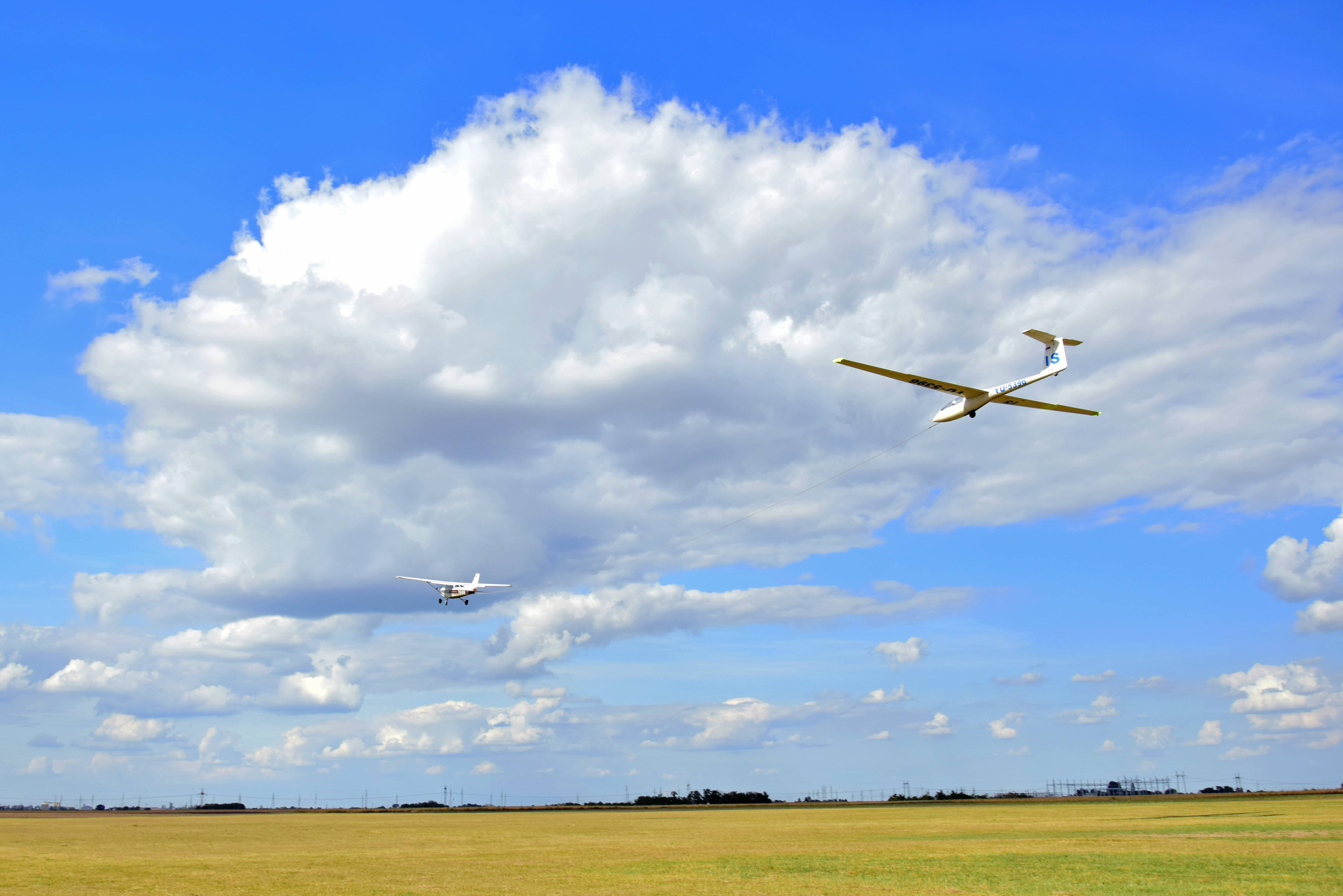
Glider towing

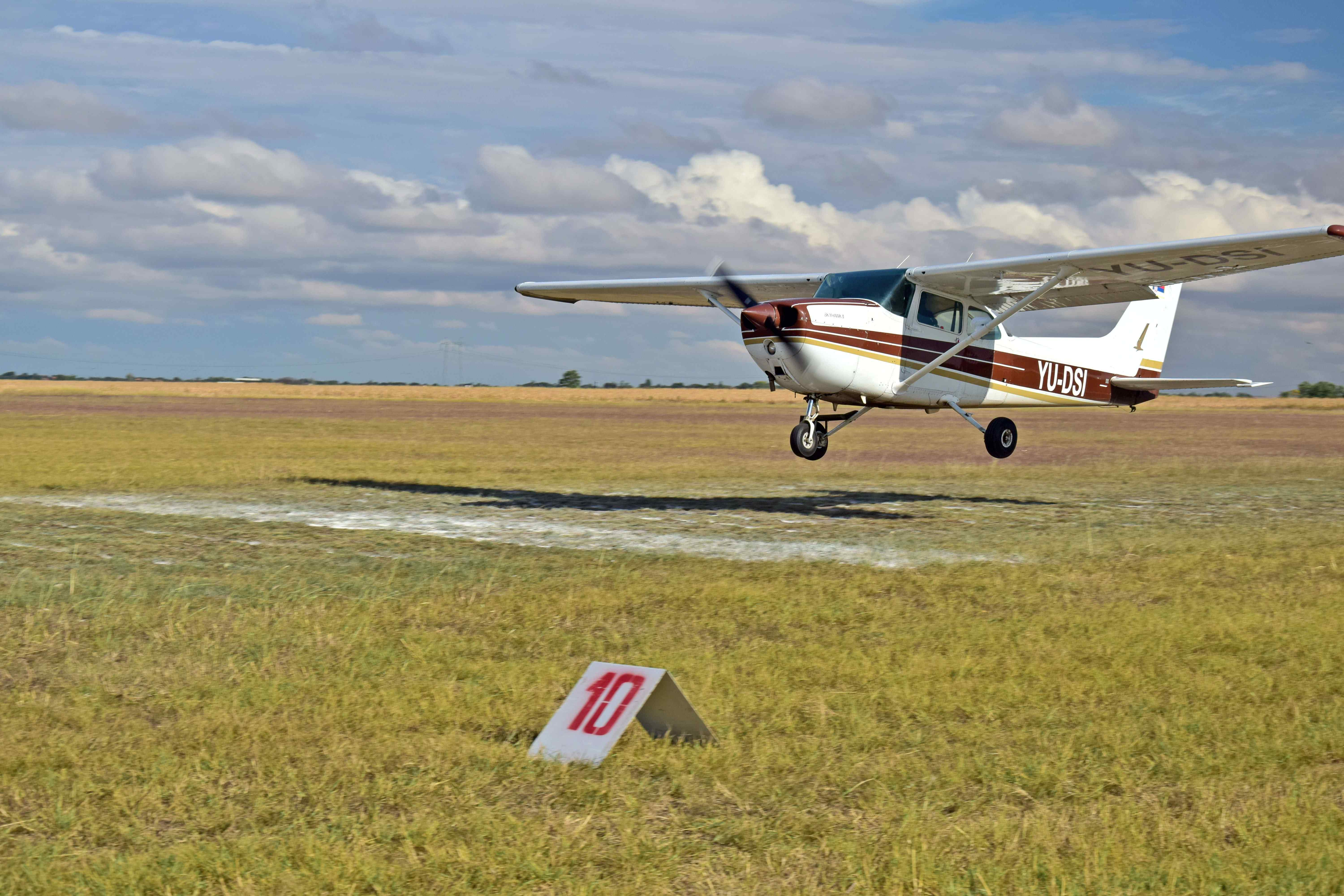
Precise flying competition

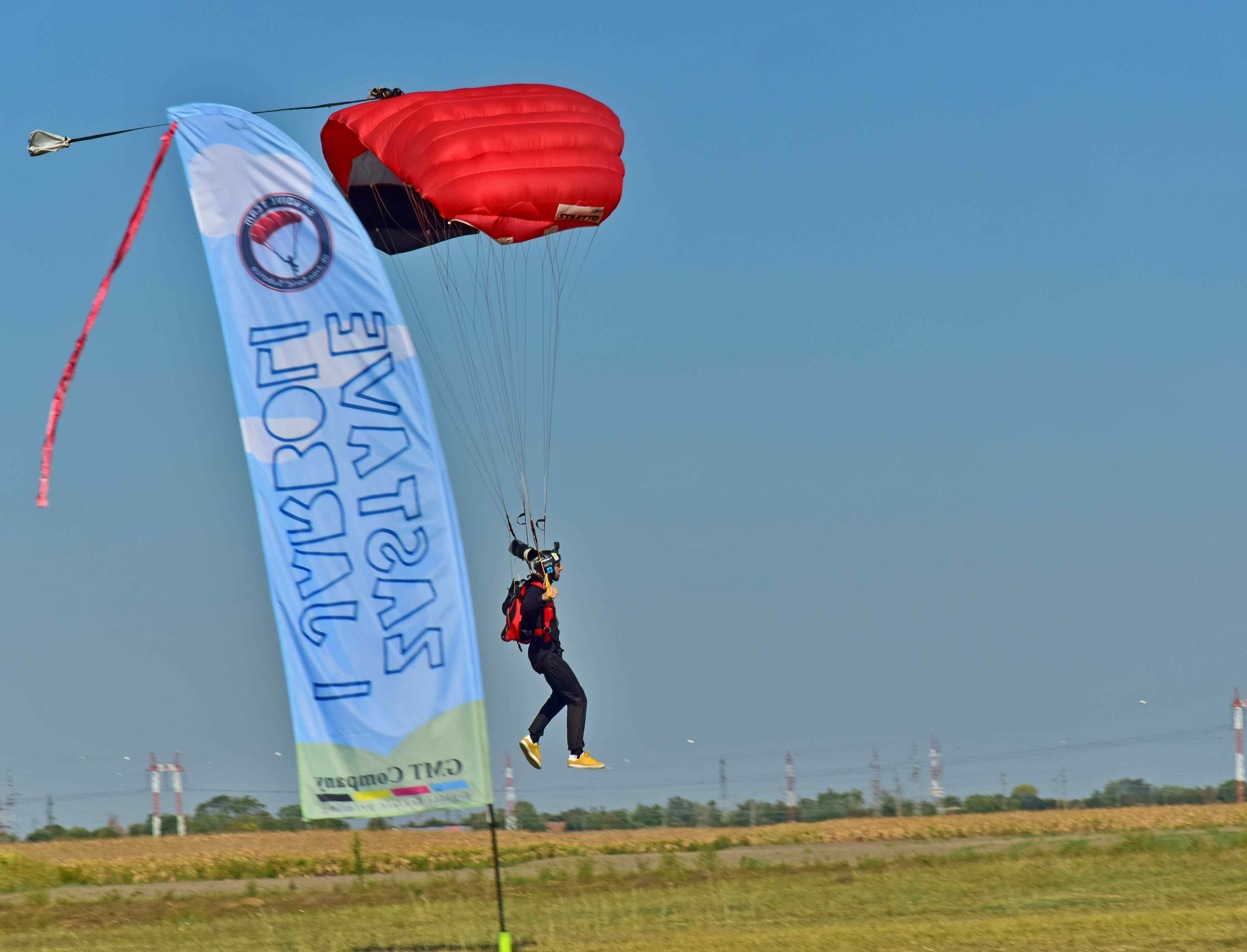
Skydiving

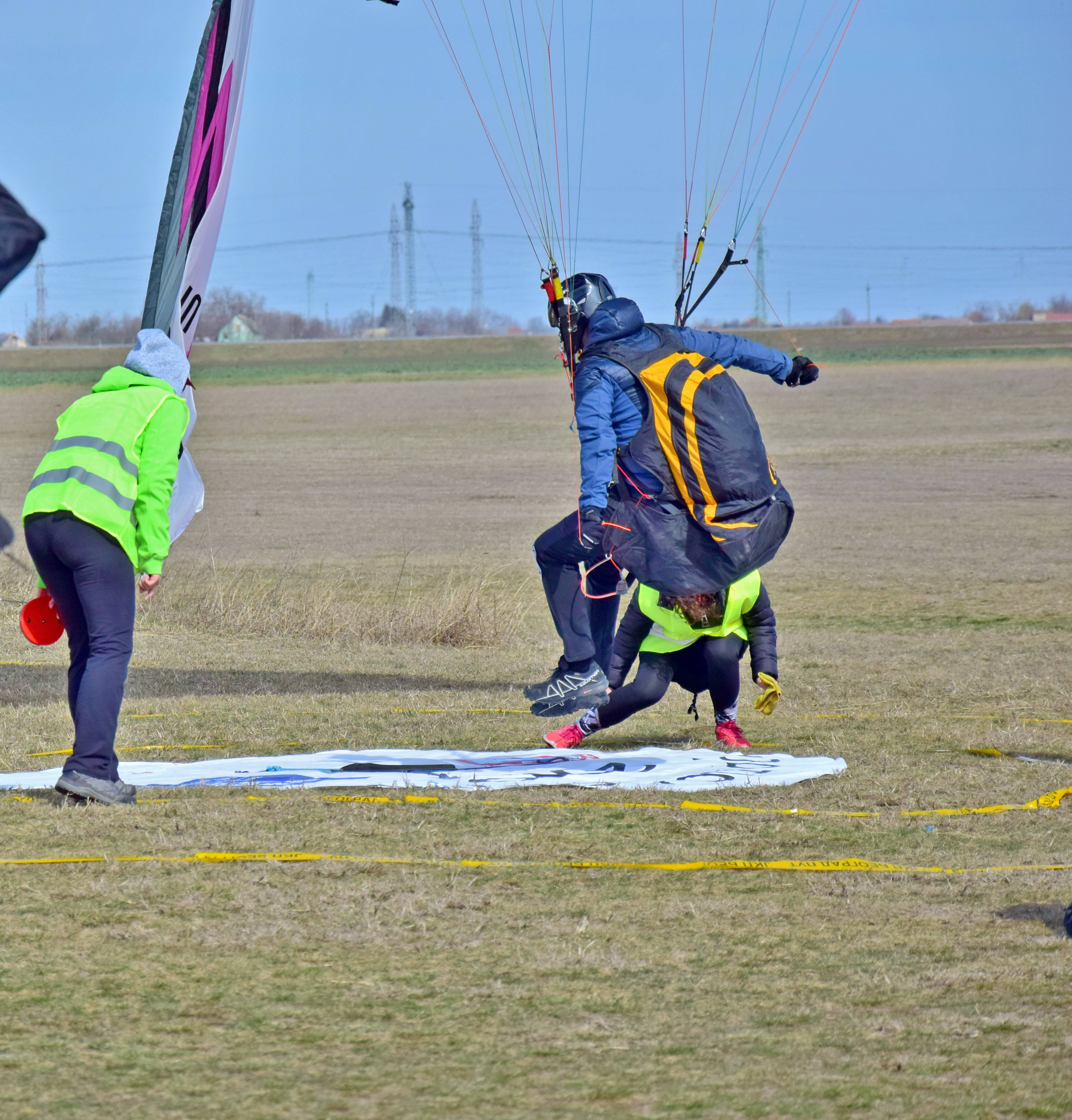
Paragliding competition

== See also ==
- List of airports in Serbia
