= Rajko Ljubič =

Serbian filmmaker

Rajko Ljubić is a Serbian film director from Subotica.

He mostly makes documentaries and short movies that deal with the life of the Bunjevci and Šokci Slavic groups from Bačka.

He has the donated many of his works to the Katolički institut za kulturu, povijest i duhovnost Ivan Antunović (Catholic Institute for the Culture, History and Spirituality Ivan Antunović).

== Awards ==
He won the Ferenc Bodrogvary Award in 2003 for the documentary film Divojke slamarke, and producing theatre play Ždribac zlatne grive.

In 2006, he won Antuš Award for special merits.

== Works ==
- Balint Vujkov, documentary film, 1993
- Ivan Antunović, documentary film, 1993
- Uskrs u Subotici, documentary film, 1994
- Dužijanca, documentary film, 1994
- Subotički tamburaški orkestar: Kao kap vode na dlanu, "musical videotape", 1995
- Subotički tamburaški orkestar: Prvih 25 godina, documentary film, 2001
- Sinagoga u Subotici, documentary film, 2002
- Dužijanca 2002., documentary film, 2002
- Đuga, short movie, 2002
- Tri slamarke, tri divojke, documentary film, 2002
- Pjesnik Jakov Kopilović, documentary film, 2002
- Kruv naš svagdanji, documentary film, 2003
- Slikar Stipan Šabić, documentary film, 2003
- Vrepčije gnjizdo, short movie, 2003
- Književnik Matija Poljaković, documentary film, 2003
- Pripovitka o dijalektu, documentary film, 2003
- Sto godina Karmelićanskog samostana u Somboru, documentary film, 2004
- Jeka mog ditinjstva, short movie, 2004
- Salaši u Bačkoj – njihov nestanak, documentary film, 2005 (co-author is Alojzije Stantić)
- Božić na salašu, documentary film, 2005
- Ana Bešlić, documentary film, 2005
- Prof. Bela Gabrić, documentary film, 2005
- Sudija i slikar Ivan Tikvicki–Pudar, documentary film, 2005
- Proslava stogodišnjice Karmela u Somboru, documentary film, 2005
- Pivaj Bačka veselo, monodrama, short movie, 2006. (as scenario was used the work of Milivoj Prćić, dedicated to football squad NK Bačka 1901),
- Tkanje i vezovi, documentary film, 2006
- Pere Tumbas Hajo-muzika je bila njegov govor, documentary and portrait-movie, 2006
- Tkanje i vezovi, etnografical documentary film, 2006
- Čukundidino zrno ora, animirani film, 2006

During October 2007, Rajko Ljubić has, in production of Radio-Subotica, directed a radio drama, made after the scenario of Matija Poljaković Č'a Bonina razgala, mostly with amateur actors (mostly for the reason that at that time there were no Croat professional actors in Subotica).
Making of this radio drama was part of planned series of radio dramas in Radio Subotica in Croatian.
