= Slobodan Kustudić =

Serbian football manager and player

Personal information
- Date of birth: 11 December 1947 (age 78)
- Place of birth: Čačak, PR Serbia, FPR Yugoslavia
- Position: Midfielder

Youth career
- Spartak Subotica

Senior career*
Years	Team	Apps	(Gls)
1966–1977	Spartak Subotica		
1977–1980	Rudar Velenje		

Managerial career
- 1985–1987: Spartak Subotica
- 1993–1994: Spartak Subotica
- 1994: Budućnost Podgorica
- 1995: Spartak Subotica
- 1996–1997: Videoton FC Fehérvár
- 1997–1998: Spartak Subotica
- 1999: Spartak Subotica
- 2001: Nagykanizsa
- 2001–2002: Mornar
- 2003: Novi Pazar
- 2004: Mačva Šabac
- 2007: Mačva Šabac
- 2007: Horgoš
- 2008: Zemun
- 2008: Laktaši
- 2009–2010: Zemun
- 2012–2013: Borac Šabac
- 2014–2017: Bačka 1901
- 2017: Bačka 1901
- 2019: Tisa Adorjan
- 2021: Sloga Čonoplja
- 2021–2023: Bačka 1901
- * Club domestic league appearances and goals

Slobodan Kustudić (Serbian Cyrillic: Слободан Кустудић; born 11 December 1947) is a Serbian football manager and former player.

== Playing career ==
Kustudić spent most of his career with Spartak Subotica, helping the club win promotion to the Yugoslav First League in 1972. He also played for Rudar Velenje in the Yugoslav Second League between 1977 and 1980.

== Managerial career ==
Kustudić started his managerial career at Spartak Subotica, leading them to promotion to the Yugoslav First League in 1986. He was also manager of Hungarian clubs Fehérvár and Nagykanizsa. Later in his managerial career, Kustudić led several lower league clubs in his homeland, including Borac Šabac, Tisa Adorjan, and Sloga Čonoplja. He was also manager of Bačka 1901 on three occasions.

== Honours ==
=== Player ===
Spartak Subotica

- Yugoslav Second League: 1971–72 (Group North)

=== Manager ===
Spartak Subotica

- Yugoslav Second League: 1985–86 (Group West)
- FR Yugoslavia Cup runner-up: 1993–94

Zemun

- Serbian Cup runner-up: 2007–08
