= Ana Bešlić =

Serbian sculptor

Ana Bešlić (Serbian Cyrillic: Ана Бешлић; 16 March 1912, Šarapusta near Bajmok – 27 February 2008, Belgrade) was a Serbian sculptor.

== Biography ==
She was born in a Sárapuszta (modern-day Šarapusta) near the Bačkan town of Bajmok, between Sombor and Subotica, at that time in Bács-Bodrog County, Kingdom of Hungary, Austria-Hungary to a family of Bunjevac origins.

Ana Bešlić was one of the most important representatives of modern sculpture in Yugoslavia and Serbia. By genre, she belonged to the group of artists that, since the 1950s, became recognisable by their artistic curiosity and non-mainstream approach, being the pioneers of changing of sculptor's style in Yugoslavia. Still, her creations were mostly oriented towards the making of monuments.

She attended schools in Zagreb, Graz and Vienna, but she developed her artistic education at the Academy of Fine Arts in Belgrade in 1949.

Part of her works were donated to the city of Subotica, including the monument of Blaško Rajić.

She spent her final years in Belgrade, where she died in 2008.

== Works ==
Her best known sculptures are Plamen, Majka i dete, Talija, Slomljena krila (being one of the best known sights in Palić), Majka i sin, Podravka's rooster, Tina Turner, and Blaško Rajić.

== Legacy ==
She won numerous awards for her work. Rajko Ljubič, a film director from Subotica, made a documentary about her in 2005.
