= Prozivka =

Locality in Serbia

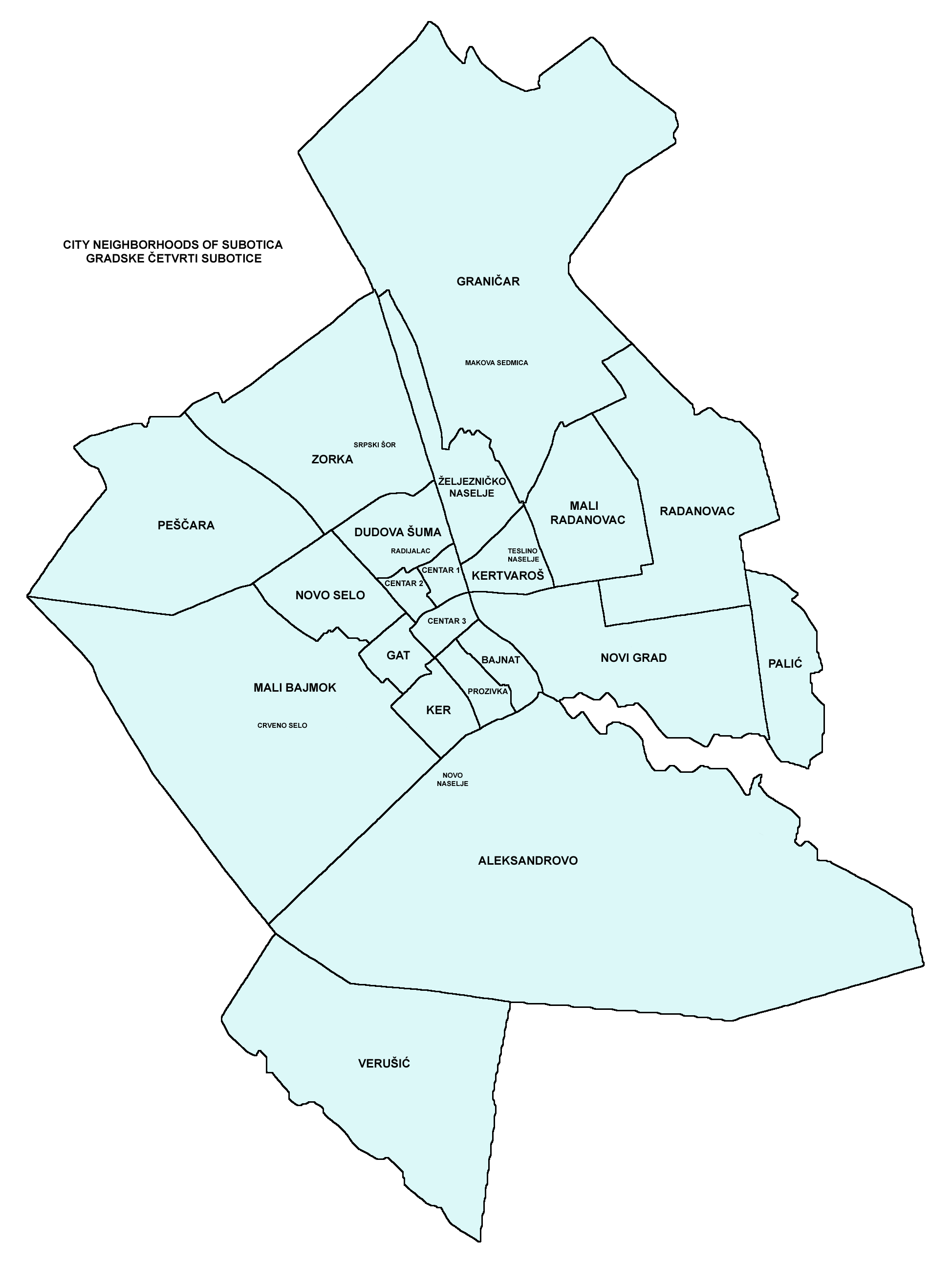
Neighborhoods in urban Subotica.

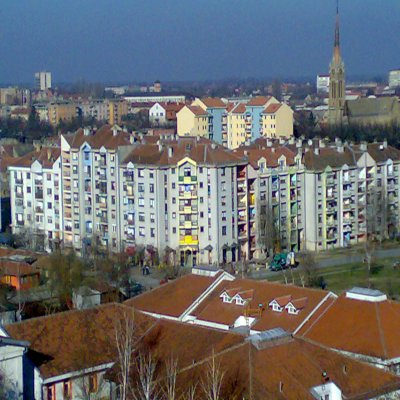
Prozivka center

Prozivka (Serbian Cyrillic: Прозивка) is a city quarter and a local community of Subotica, a city in northern Serbia. It has a population of 9,100.

== Geography ==
Prozivka is situated in the southern part of Subotica. It borders former Subotica - Pačir railway on the southeast, Radić Brothers Street on the northeast, Eugen Kumičić Street on the northwest and the Belgrade Road on the southwest.

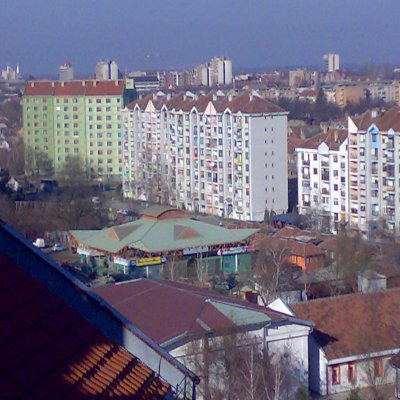
Prozivka north
