= Tihomir Ognjanov =

Serbian footballer

Personal information
- Full name: Tihomir Ognjanov
- Date of birth: 2 March 1927
- Place of birth: Subotica, Kingdom of SCS
- Date of death: 2 July 2006 (aged 79)
- Place of death: Subotica, Serbia
- Position: Forward

Youth career
- 1939: ŽAK Subotica
- RSK Subotica
- Bačka Subotica

Senior career*
Years	Team	Apps	(Gls)
1946–1947	Spartak Subotica		
1947	Partizan	0	(0)
1947–1949	Spartak Subotica		
1949–1953	Red Star Belgrade	69	(21)
1953–1961	Spartak Subotica	148	(94)
Total		217	(115)

International career
1943	Yugoslavia U-20	5	(3)
1949–1955	Yugoslavia B	2	(1)
1950–1956	Yugoslavia	28	(7)

Managerial career
- OFK Subotica
- 1981: Spartak Subotica
- Crvenka
- Sever Subotica
- 1989: Spartak Subotica
Medal record
Men's Football
Representing Yugoslavia
Olympic Games
Silver medal – second place	1952 Helsinki	Team
- * Club domestic league appearances and goals

Tihomir Ognjanov (Serbian Cyrillic: Тихомир Огњанов; 2 March 1927 – 2 July 2006) was a Serbian footballer who was part of Yugoslavia national football team at the 1950 and 1954 FIFA World Cups. He later became a manager.

== Club career ==
He played for Spartak Subotica (in three different periods), Partizan (when he was in the Yugoslav Army although he only played in friendly matches) and Red Star. With Red Star he won 2 national championships (1951, 1953) and 2 Yugoslav cups (1949, 1950).

== International career ==
On the national level, Ognjanov made his debut for Yugoslavia in a May 1950 friendly match against Denmark and earned a total of 28 caps, scoring 7 goals. He won the silver medal at the 1952 Summer Olympics. His final international was a November 1956 friendly away against Scotland.
