= Lajoš Jakovetić =

Personal information
- Full name: Lajoš Jakovetić
- Date of birth: 15 November 1922
- Place of birth: Subotica, Kingdom of Serbs, Croats, and Slovenes
- Date of death: 27 January 2003 (aged 80)
- Position: Defender

Youth career
- Bačka 1901

Senior career*
Years	Team	Apps	(Gls)
1945	SAP Vojvodina	2	(0)
1946–1948	Spartak Subotica	35	(3)
1948–1952	Partizan	51	(2)
1952–1957	Spartak Subotica	71	(3)

International career
1949	Yugoslavia	4	(0)

Managerial career
- 1962: Spartak Subotica
- * Club domestic league appearances and goals

Lajoš Jakovetić (Serbian Cyrillic: Лајош Јаковетић; 15 November 1922 – 27 January 2003) was a Serbian, Yugoslavia international, football player and manager.

== Playing career ==
=== Club ===
He started playing in the youth teams of his home town club FK Bačka 1901. He represented the region of Vojvodina at the first season that was played after the end of the Second World War, that was played in a particular way, being the players distributed by the internal republics and autonomous provinces. That was the only season played in that peculiar way, returning the league to its normal clubs format in the next, 1946-47 season. He was playing in his hometown club Spartak Subotica. In 1948, he moved to Partizan where he played until 1952, having won the 1948–49 championship. Afterwards, he returned to Spartak where he played until 1957, when he ended his playing career.

=== International ===
After having moved to Partizan, he played for the Yugoslavia national team four times. His debut was on 21 August 1949 in Belgrade against Israel (a 6-0 win) and his last match was on 13 November of the same year, also in Belgrade, against Austria (this time a 5-2 defeat).

== Managerial career ==
He was the manager of the club where he started and ended his playing career, Spartak Subotica, having managed to take them to the 1962 Yugoslav Cup final where they lost 4-1 against the OFK Belgrade.

== Honours ==
=== Player ===
Partizan

- Yugoslav First League (1): 1948-49
