= Ivo Šeparović =

Croatian footballer (born 1961)

Personal information
- Date of birth: 1 January 1961 (age 65)
- Place of birth: Vela Luka, SFR Yugoslavia
- Position: Midfielder

Senior career*
Years	Team	Apps	(Gls)
1979–1982	Hajduk Split	10	(0)
1981–1983	Solin	19	(3)
1984–1985	Spartak Subotica	7	(0)
1984–1989	GOŠK-Jug	69	(0)
1989–1992	Olimpija Ljubljana	84	(10)
1992	Segesta	12	(1)
1993–1994	GOŠK Dubrovnik	22	(1)

International career
1991	Croatia	1	(0)
- * Club domestic league appearances and goals

Ivo Šeparović (born 1 January 1961) is a Croatian retired international footballer.

== Club career ==
He started his professional career playing in the Yugoslav First League, today a Croatian giants Hajduk Split. In January 1982, he moved to a lower league NK Solin, before returning to the First League in 1984, when he played half season in Serbian club Spartak Subotica. Next, he returned to Dalmatia to play in GOŠK Dubrovnik where he will stay until 1989, and become an influential player. Then, he moved to Slovenian club Olimpija Ljubljana, where he'll stay for two seasons, until the break-up of Yugoslavia. He returned to Dubrovnik, playing now in Croatian First League where he ended his playing career.

== International career ==
He played one match for the Croatia national football team in Jun 1991 against Slovenia, coming on as a 46th-minute substitute for Ivan Cvjetković. As Croatia was still part of Yugoslavia at the time, the game is deemed not official by FIFA.
