= 2007–08 Serbian League Vojvodina =

- Sport: Football
- Founded: 2006
- No. of teams: 16
- Country: Serbia
- Most recent champion: FK Novi Sad

Serbian League Vojvodina is a section of the Serbian League, Serbia's third football league. Teams from Vojvodina are in this section of the league. The other sections are Serbian League East, Serbian League West, and Serbian League Belgrade.

== League table ==
Pos	Team	Pld	W	D	L	GF	GA	GD	Pts	Promotion or relegation
1	Zlatibor Voda	30	25	4	1	74	16	+58	79	Promoted to First league of Serbia
2	Inđija	30	21	7	2	71	23	+48	70	Playoff for promotion
3	Proleter Novi Sad	30	18	6	6	54	32	+22	60	
4	Big Bull	30	12	12	6	52	23	+29	48	
5	Sloven Ruma	30	14	3	13	36	49	−13	45	
6	Spartak Subotica	30	13	5	12	53	44	+9	44	
7	Palić Koming	30	10	9	11	48	44	+4	39	
8	Sloga Temerin	30	11	5	14	42	43	−1	38	
9	Radnički Nova Pazova	30	11	4	15	39	44	−5	37	
10	Bačka	30	9	10	11	26	40	−14	37	
11	Radnički Sombor	30	9	8	13	35	42	−7	35	
12	Mladost Bački Jarak	30	9	8	13	33	43	−10	35	
13	Tekstilac Odžaci	30	9	8	13	41	52	−11	35	
14	Spartak Debeljača	30	8	9	13	33	55	−22	33	Relegation playoff
15	Vršac	30	6	5	19	26	51	−25	23	Relegated to regional leagues
16	Jedinstvo Stara Pazova	30	2	3	25	26	88	−62	9	Relegated to regional leagues

== Top scorers ==
Goals	Player	Team
14	(Serbia) Ljubiša Kekić	Inđija
13	(Serbia) Ružić	Palić
12	(Serbia) Maslić	Sloven
11	(Serbia) Ćirić	Big Bull
9	(Serbia) Kalinov	Sloga

Last updated: April 22, 2008

== Stadia ==
Team	Stadium	Capacity
Zlatibor Voda	Gradski stadion Subotica	28,000
Inđija	Stadion FK Inđija	3,500
Sloven	Borkovačka Dolina	9,297
Radnicki (NP)	Stadion FK Radnicki (NP)	1,000
Palić Koming	Stadion pored Jezera	10,000
Bačka	Stadion Slavko Maletin Vava	4,000
Spartak	Gradski stadion Subotica	28,000
Radnicki	Gradski stadion Sombor	8,000
Jedinstvo	Stadion FK Jedinstvo Stara Pazova	2,000
