= Petar Kurćubić =

Serbian football manager and player

Personal information
- Date of birth: 25 May 1961 (age 65)
- Place of birth: Novi Sad, FPR Yugoslavia
- Position: Midfielder

Senior career*
| Years | Team | Apps | (Gls) |
- Novi Sad
| 1989–1990 | Zemun | 33 | (4) |

Managerial career
- Novi Sad
- 1999–2000: Obilić
- Novi Sad
- 2004–2005: Pobeda
- 2005–2006: Olimpik Baku
- 2006–2007: Mladost Apatin
- 2007: Banat Zrenjanin
- 2008: ČSK Čelarevo
- 2008–2009: Nitra
- 2009: ČSK Čelarevo
- 2010–2011: Dolný Kubín
- 2011: Hajduk Kula
- 2012–2013: Spartak Subotica
- 2014–2015: Spartak Subotica
- 2015: Novi Pazar
- 2015: Borac Banja Luka
- 2017: TSC
- 2018–2019: Krupa
- 2019: Hajduk 1912
- 2020: Bačka 1901
- 2021: Novi Sad 1921
- * Club domestic league appearances and goals

Petar Kurćubić (Serbian Cyrillic: Петар Курћубић; born 25 May 1961) is a Serbian football manager and former player.

== Playing career ==
Kurćubić played for Zemun in the 1989–90 Yugoslav Second League, helping the club win promotion to the Yugoslav First League.

== Managerial career ==
Kurćubić started his managerial career with Novi Sad. He was appointed as manager of Obilić in late December 1999. However, Kurćubić was replaced by Dragan Lacmanović in late January 2000 during preparations for the second part of the season.

Later on, Kurćubić served as manager of numerous clubs in his homeland and abroad, including Macedonian Pobeda (2004–August 2005), Azerbaijani Olimpik Baku (October 2005 – 2006), Mladost Apatin (June 2006–June 2007), Banat Zrenjanin (June–October 2007), ČSK Čelarevo (two spells), Slovak Nitra (December 2008–June 2009), Slovak Dolný Kubín (2010–2011), Hajduk Kula (September–December 2011), Spartak Subotica (two spells; September 2012–October 2013 and June 2014–April 2015), Novi Pazar (June–August 2015), Bosnian Borac Banja Luka (September–October 2015), TSC (June–December 2017), and Bosnian Krupa (October 2018–March 2019).
