= FK Horgoš =

Serbian football club

Horgoš
- Full name: Fudbalski Klub Horgoš
- Founded: 1911; 115 years ago
- Dissolved: 2008 (merged with Spartak Subotica)
- Ground: Stadion FK Horgoš
- Capacity: 1,000
- Chairman: Sors Róbert
- Manager: Dejan Veselinov
- League: Potiska međuopštinska liga
- 2007–08: Serbian League Vojvodina, 1st of 16 (promoted)
Home colours	Away colours

FK Horgoš (Serbian Cyrillic: ФК Хоргош) is a defunct football club based in Horgoš, Serbia. They achieved their best results under the sponsorship name Zlatibor Voda, before merging with Spartak Subotica in 2008.

== History ==
After finishing sixth in the 2004–05 Vojvodina League North, the club won first place in the 2005–06 season and took promotion to the Serbian League Vojvodina. They placed fifth in their debut appearance in the third tier, before winning first place in the following 2007–08 season and earning promotion to the second tier of Serbian football. In July 2008, the club merged with Spartak Subotica to compete under the name Spartak Zlatibor Voda in the 2008–09 Serbian First League.

A new club, FK Horgoš 1911, was established in 2013.

== Honours ==
Serbian League Vojvodina (Tier 3)

- 2007–08

Vojvodina League North (Tier 4)

- 2005–06

== Managerial history ==
Period	Name
2007	(Serbia) Slobodan Kustudić
2008	(Serbia) Ranko Popović
