= FK Bačka 1901 =

- Full name: Fudbalski Klub Bačka 1901
- Nickname: Crveno-bili (The Red-Whites)
- Founded: 3 August 1901; 125 years ago
- Ground: Stadion kraj Somborske kapije, Subotica
- Capacity: 3,700
- Chairman: Nemanja Simović
- League: PFL Subotica
- 2024–25: Vojvodina League North, 14th (relegated)
Home colours	Away colours

FK Bačka 1901 (Serbian Cyrillic: ФК Бачка 1901) is a football club from Subotica, Serbia, that competes in the 5th tier-PFL Subotica. It is the longest running club in Serbia and also the oldest within the former Yugoslavia. Founded in 1901 in Subotica, the club's colors are red and white, while the club's anthem is Pivaj Bačka veselo.

== History ==
The club was founded in 1901, during Austro-Hungarian administration.

Its first name was Bácska Szabadkai Athletikai Club, since it was registered by the Austro-Hungarian authorities in Hungarian language.

In its early years, the club played in the leagues of the Austro-Hungarian Kingdom of Hungary, regularly winning in the southern league. After beginning of the First World War, the region became part of the Kingdom of Serbs, Croats and Slovenes (renamed Yugoslavia in 1929), and the club participated in the Yugoslav championship twice, in its 1923 inaugural season and in 1925. During this time the club was named JSD Bačka.

In 1941, during the Axis occupation of Yugoslavia, Bačka was attached to Horthy's Hungary and the club was forced to compete in the Hungarian League, where it entered competition in its third-tier. In 1945 the communist authorities renamed the club to HAŠK Građanski (Croat Academical Sports Club Građanski) in their attempt to Croatize Slavic populations of Bačka region. Soon after the club was renamed to FD Sloboda. Later, it was renamed to FD Zvezda, and in 1963, the club returned the name Bačka.

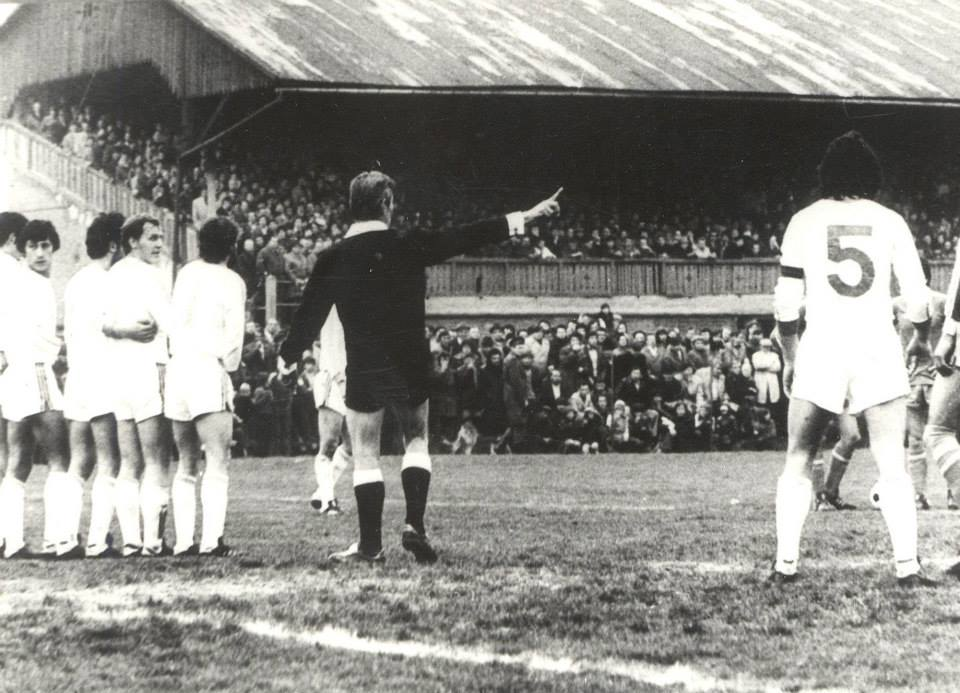
FK Bačka 1901 - AIK Bačka Topola in Subotica (1970s)

FK Bačka 1901 were promoted to the Serbian League Vojvodina, national third tier in 2013.

In May 2007 the president of the club became Dragan Vujković, former member of the Yugoslav national boxing team and silver medalist from two World Amateur Championships.

=== Names through history ===
- "Bácska" SAC
- JAD "Bačka"
- HŠK "Bačka"
- HAŠK "Građanski"
- FD "Sloboda"
- FD "Zvezda"
- FK "Bačka"

== Recent league history ==
Season	Division	P	W	D	L	F	A	Pts	Pos
2020–21	Serbian League Vojvodina	38	12	5	21	48	73	41	15th
2021–22	Vojvodina League North	30	17	6	7	69	43	57	2nd
2022–23	Vojvodina League North	30	13	3	14	63	48	42	7th
2023–24	Vojvodina League North	30	13	4	13	49	54	43	9th
2024–25	Vojvodina League North	30	7	7	16	32	45	28	14th

== Notable players ==
These players are listed in the club's official website. In alphabetic order:

- Csaba Béres
- Zoran Bogešić
- Stanko Bogojević
- Ivica Bošnjak
- Predrag Bošnjak, Hungarian national team player
- Ivan Budinčević
- Mijo Bukvić
- Antun Copko
- Beno Cvijanov
- Mirko Evetović
- Stjepan Gabrić
- Lajoš Jakovetić, Yugoslavia national team player
- Mihalj Kečkeš, Yugoslavia national football team player
- István Kenyeres
- Nesto Kopunović
- Andrija Kujundžić, Yugoslavia national team player
- Zoltan Kujundžić
- Gordan Lazić
- Josip Lerinc
- Tomo Malagurski
- Zoran Mandić
- Remija Marcikić, Yugoslavia national team player and Southern Hungarian selected team player
- Nikola Matković

- Tihomir Ognjanov, Yugoslavia national team player
- Marinko Poljaković
- Josip Rajčić
- Tibor Rehm
- Pero Remeš
- Antun Rudinski, Yugoslavia national team player
- Nikola Sadojević
- Ivan Sarić
- Tomislav Sivić
- Ivan Skenderović
- Dezider Szlezák
- Attila Szabados
- József Szili
- Radovan Šimun
- Slobodan Šujica
- Zoran Trivunov
- László Varga
- Dejan Vilotić
- Marko Vujković
- Zoltán Wagner
- Miloš Zakić
- Josip Zemko, Yugoslavia national team player

Besides these above, among Bačka's legendary persons are Lajos Vermes, Nikola Matković and Đuro Stantić.

For the list of former and current players with Wikipedia article, please see: Category:FK Bačka 1901 players.

== Historical list of coaches ==
- Zoltán Wagner (1901–1906)
- Gyula Gruber (1906–1914)
- Ivan Milašin (1914–1920)
- Aleksandar Perl (1920–1924)
- Ferenc Nagy (1924–1926)
- Aleksandar Perl (1926–1930)
- (Socialist Federal Republic of Yugoslavia) Andrija Kujundžić - Čiča (1930–1941)
- Lajoš Gencel (1945–1946)
- Miroslav Stojanović (1948–1949)
- Laslo Varga (1949–1950)
- Lajoš Gencel (1950–1951)
- Josip Vad (1951–1952)
- Lajoš Gencel (1952–1953)
- Željko Sabanov (1953–1954)
- Beno Cvijanov (1954–1955)
- (Socialist Federal Republic of Yugoslavia) Gustav Matković (1955–1959)
- (Socialist Federal Republic of Yugoslavia) Alexi Petrović (1959–1960)
- Laslo Varga (1960–1963)
- Jožef Koras (1963–1965)
- (Socialist Federal Republic of Yugoslavia) Gustav Matković (1965–1966)
- Laslo Varga (1966–1969)
- (Socialist Federal Republic of Yugoslavia) Tihomir Ognjanov (1969–1971)
- Franjo Čović (1971–1972)
- Miloš Glončak (1972–1974)
- (Socialist Federal Republic of Yugoslavia) Josip Zemko (1974–1977)
- Branko Roksandić (1977–1978)
- Đorđe Palatinus
- Tome Malagurski
- (Socialist Federal Republic of Yugoslavia) Dobrivoje Trivić (1978–1979)
- Lajčo Jakovetić (1979–1980)
- Branko Roksandić (1980–1981)
- Josip Rajčić (1981–1986)
- Budisav Pajić (1986–1987)
- Slobodan Šujica (1987–1988)
- Budisav Pajić (1988–1989)
- (Socialist Federal Republic of Yugoslavia) Slobodan Šujica (1989–1990)
- (Socialist Federal Republic of Yugoslavia) Josip Rajčić (1990–1991)
- (Socialist Federal Republic of Yugoslavia) Josip Zemko
- (Socialist Federal Republic of Yugoslavia) Josip Lerinc
- (Socialist Federal Republic of Yugoslavia) Slobodan Šujica (1991)
- (Socialist Federal Republic of Yugoslavia) Hajrudin Saračević (1991–1992)
- (Federal Republic of Yugoslavia) Slobodan Kustudić (1992–1993)
- (Federal Republic of Yugoslavia) Josip Zemko
- (Federal Republic of Yugoslavia) Marko Vujković
- (Federal Republic of Yugoslavia) Danilo Mandić (1993–1994)
- (Federal Republic of Yugoslavia) Josip Zemko
- (Federal Republic of Yugoslavia) Marko Vujković
- (Federal Republic of Yugoslavia) Danilo Mandić (1994–1995)
- (Federal Republic of Yugoslavia) Josip Rajčić
- (Hungary) István Gligor (1995–1996)
- (Federal Republic of Yugoslavia) Danilo Mandić (1996–1997)
- (Federal Republic of Yugoslavia) Josip Rajčić
- (Federal Republic of Yugoslavia) Marko Vujković (1998–1999)
- (Federal Republic of Yugoslavia) Josip Rajčić (1999–2001)
- (Serbia) Josip Zemko (-2012)
- (Bosnia and Herzegovina) Zoran Milidrag (2012)
- (Serbia) Slobodan Kustudić (2014- Oct 2017)
- (Serbia) Zoran Ćirić (24 Oct 2017-Jun 2018)
- (Serbia) Željko Račić (1 Jul 2018-Oct 2018)
- (Serbia) Sava Pavićević (17 Oct 2018-Sep 2020)
- (Serbia) Petar Kurćubić (29 Sep 2020-Dec 2020)
- (Serbia) Dejan Srdić (4 Jan 2021-Mar 2021)
- (Serbia) Predrag Pejović (23 Mar 2021- Jun 2021)
- (Serbia) Slobodan Kustudić (2021-2023)
- (Serbia) Aleksandar Kopunović (23 Jan 2024-)

== FK Bačka in art ==
Croatian writer from Bačka, Milivoj Prćić, has written a monodrama, Pivaj Bačka veselo, dedicated to this club.

Later in 2006, Rajko Ljubič made a movie of the same name after Prćić's work.
