= FK Spartak Subotica =

Spartak Subotica
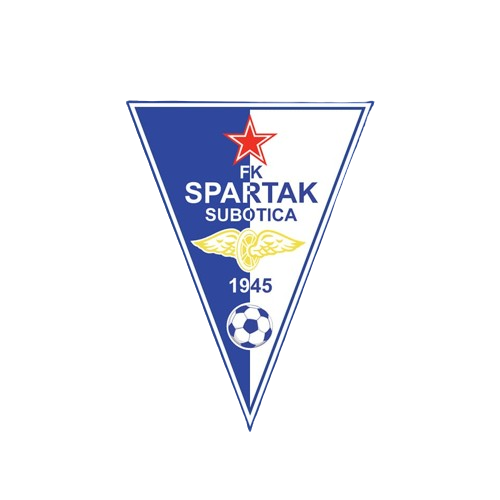
- Full name: Fudbalski klub Spartak Subotica
- Founded: 21 April 1945; 81 years ago
- Ground: Subotica City Stadium
- Capacity: 13,000
- President: Nikola Simović
- Head coach: Savo Pavićević
- League: Serbian First League
- 2025–26: Serbian SuperLiga, 15th of 16 (relegated)
- Website: fkspartak.com
| Home colours | Away colours |

Fudbalski klub Spartak Subotica (Serbian Cyrillic: Фудбалски клуб Спартак Суботица) is a professional football club from Subotica, Serbia. They compete in the Serbian First League.

The club was founded in 1945 and was named after Jovan Mikić Spartak, a national hero and the leader of the Partisans in Subotica, who was killed in 1944.

The club participated in the first postwar club competition, the 1946–47 Yugoslav First League, and from then on were relegated to the second league then promoted again to the first league in a persistent cycle. Their biggest success was reaching the 1993–94 FR Yugoslavia Cup final against Partizan which they lost 1–6.

After the end of the 2007–08 Serbian League Vojvodina, the club merged with Zlatibor Voda which won promotion to the Serbian First League thus gaining the name Spartak Zlatibor Voda. In 2013, the board decided to return to the original name of the club.

== History ==
=== Origins ===
Football in Subotica has long tradition. During the pre-WWII period, the city was the seat of the Subotica Football Subassociation, one of the subassociations which existed within the Yugoslav Football Association, and which organised league competitions whose winners qualified for the Yugoslav championship where the national champion was decided. Subotica was home to three major clubs that made it to the Yugoslav championship before 1941: Bačka, SAND and ŽAK Subotica. Bačka has the distinction of being the oldest football club in the entire territory of former Yugoslavia.

During World War Two, when Subotica was invaded by Axis forces in 1941 and incorporated into Hungary, its football clubs were likewise absorbed into the Hungarian league system. At the end of the war Yugoslavia regained control of Subotica. Some clubs such as SAND were dissolved; others, like Bačka, continued, but at a much lower level; and some new ones were formed, such as Radnički and Građanski. ŽAK Subotica remained active until their main sponsor, Yugoslav Railways, dissolved it to form a new club named "Spartak", the nickname of a legendary athlete from Subotica, Jovan Mikić who, during the war, was a Partisan commander. Besides the players, the stadium, the team colours and the fans, Spartak also inherited from ŽAK the backing of the Yugoslav Railways.

=== 1946 to 2006 ===
During the period of socialist Yugoslavia, Spartak played in either the Yugoslav First or Second league. Although they never won the national championship, they produced good home grown players who succeeded domestically and abroad, brought in talented players from other regions of Yugoslavia, and contributed a number of players to the national team. During this period, the highlight was their appearance in the 1961–62 Yugoslav Cup, even though they lost.

Spartak was a finalist again in 1994. By then the old SFR Yugoslavia had broken up after which Serbia and Montenegro established FR Yugoslavia. Spartak was a regular participant of the First League of FR Yugoslavia until the 1999–2000 season when they were relegated and a period of decline began which lasted until 2008 when they merged with FK Zlatibor Voda from neighbouring town of Horgoš. Playing under the name FK Spartak Zlatibor Voda, the club was promoted to the 2009–10 Serbian SuperLiga.

=== 2006 till nowadays ===
Spartak's biggest success since the establishment of Serbia in 2006, came in the 2018–19 UEFA Europa League qualifying rounds. They first defeated Northern Irish club Coleraine F.C. in Round 1, then went on to achieve what is considered their brightest moment in club history, defeating Czech powerhouse AC Sparta Prague. They were eventually eliminated from the UEFA Europa League in the 3rd qualifying round, losing to Danish club Brøndby IF over two legs.

== Supporters ==
Spartak's fans are known as Marinci (Marines), which were formed in early 1989.

== Stadium ==
Subotica City Stadium (Gradski stadion) is a multi-use stadium in Subotica, Serbia. It is currently used mostly for football matches and is the club's home ground since 1945. The stadium holds 13,000 people. There is a football pitch and a registered track for athletics suitable for competitions. One part of the Stadium is covered. There are also two subsidiary football pitches.

== Spartak in Europe ==
=== Mitropa Cup ===
The Mitropa Cup, officially called the La Coupe de l'Europe Centrale, was one of the first really international major European football cups that the club participated in. After World War II, in 1951, a replacement tournament named Zentropa Cup was held to resume the rich tradition of this competition.

| Season | Contest | Round | State | Club | Score | Place |
|---|---|---|---|---|---|---|
| 1987 | Mitropa Cup | Semi-finals | Italy | Ascoli | 1–2 | Ascoli |
| 1987 | Mitropa Cup | Third-place match | Hungary | Vasas | 0–2 | Porto Sant'Elpidio |

=== UEFA competitions ===
- Qualified for Europe in 2 seasons

| Season | Competition | Round | Club | Home | Away | Aggregate |
|---|---|---|---|---|---|---|
| 2010–11 | Europa League | QR2 | (Luxembourg) Differdange 03 | 2–0 | 3–3 | 5–3 |
| 2010–11 | Europa League | QR3 | (Ukraine) Dnipro Dnipropetrovsk | 2–1 | 0–2 | 2–3 |
| 2018–19 | Europa League | QR1 | (Northern Ireland) Coleraine | 1–1 | 2–0 | 3–1 |
| 2018–19 | Europa League | QR2 | (Czech Republic) Sparta Prague | 2–0 | 1–2 | 3–2 |
| 2018–19 | Europa League | QR3 | (Denmark) Brøndby | 0–2 | 1–2 | 1–4 |

== Honours ==
=== League ===
National Championships – 1

- People's Republic of Serbia League (Vojvodina group)
  - Winners (1): 1945–46
- Yugoslav Second League
  - Winners (4): 1952, 1971–72, 1985–86 (West), 1987–88 (West)

=== Cup ===
- Yugoslav Cup
  - Runners-up (2): 1961–62, 1993–94

== Players ==
=== Current squad ===
As of 1 August 2026

Note: Flags indicate national team as defined under FIFA eligibility rules; some limited exceptions apply. Players may hold more than one non-FIFA nationality.

| No. | Pos. | Nation | Player |
|---|---|---|---|
| 1 | GK | MNE | Dimitrije Minić |
| 2 | DF | SRB | Uroš Petrović |
| 3 | DF | SRB | Vladimir Vitorović |
| 4 | DF | SRB | Miloš Kosanović |
| 5 | DF | SRB | Nikola Puškar |
| 6 | MF | NGR | Francis Nwokeabia |
| 9 | FW | COL | José Mulato |
| 10 | MF | SRB | Aleksa Trajković |
| 11 | MF | SRB | Nebojša Bastajić |
| 12 | GK | SRB | Marin Dulić |
| 15 | DF | SRB | Luka Subotić (captain) |
| 17 | MF | SRB | Stefan Jovanović |
| 19 | FW | SRB | Uroš Pavlović |
| 20 | MF | MNE | Nenad Miranović |
| 22 | FW | SRB | Aleksandar Petrović |

| No. | Pos. | Nation | Player |
|---|---|---|---|
| 23 | MF | SRB | Aleksandar Kovačević |
| 24 | MF | BIH | Strahinja Vasilić |
| 27 | MF | SRB | Stefan Stojanović |
| 30 | DF | SRB | Luka Peić |
| 33 | MF | SRB | Nikola Kuveljić |
| 36 | DF | SRB | Vladimir Desnica |
| 44 | DF | SRB | Nikola Motika |
| 45 | GK | BIH | Nikola Grujić |
| 50 | MF | SRB | Nikola Tasić |
| 55 | DF | SRB | Vladimir Kovačević |
| 71 | MF | BRA | Thiago Campos |
| 77 | MF | BRA | Enzo |
| 82 | GK | SRB | Luka Avramović |
| 88 | DF | SRB | David Angelevski |
| 99 | FW | SRB | Anđelko Pavlović |

=== Players with multiple nationalities ===
- (Bosnia and Herzegovina) (Serbia) Nikola Grujić

=== Out on loan ===
Note: Flags indicate national team as defined under FIFA eligibility rules; some limited exceptions apply. Players may hold more than one non-FIFA nationality.

| No. | Pos. | Nation | Player |
|---|---|---|---|
| — | FW | NGR | Daniel James Wisdom (at KAA Gent until the end of the season) |

== Club officials ==
As of 27 September 2025

Current officials
- President: (Serbia) Nikola Simović
- Sporting director: (Serbia) Vojo Ubiparip
- Head coach: (Montenegro) Savo Pavićević
- Assistant head coach: (Serbia) Đorđe Tutorić
- Fitness coach: (Serbia) Luka Đurović
- Goalkeeping coach: (Bosnia and Herzegovina) Mustafa Peštalić
- TK Physiotherapist: (Serbia) Aleksandar Lovadinov
- Physiotherapist: (Serbia) Mile Suvajac
- General secretary: (Serbia) Nenad Ćurković

== Notable players ==
To appear in this section a player must have either:

- Played at least 80 games for the club.
- Set a club record or won an individual award while at the club.
- Played at least one international match for their national team at any time.
- (Serbia) Milan Jovanić
- (Serbia) Andrija Kaluđerović
- (Serbia) Dejan Kekezović
- (Serbia) Ognjen Koroman
- (Serbia) Zoran Ljubinković
- (Serbia) Predrag Mijić
- (Serbia) Igor Popović
- (Serbia) Dejan Rončević
- (Serbia) Lazar Tufegdžić
- (Serbia) Vojo Ubiparip
- (Serbia) Vladimir Veselinov
- (Serbia) Nemanja Vidić
- (Serbia) Nikola Žigić
- (Socialist Federal Republic of Yugoslavia) Miloš Cetina
- (Socialist Federal Republic of Yugoslavia) Zvonko Ćirić
- (Socialist Federal Republic of Yugoslavia) Zoran Dimitrijević
- (Socialist Federal Republic of Yugoslavia) Milorad Đukanović
- (Socialist Federal Republic of Yugoslavia) Miloš Glončak
- (Socialist Federal Republic of Yugoslavia) Lajoš Jakovetić
- (Socialist Federal Republic of Yugoslavia) Gojko Janjić
- (Socialist Federal Republic of Yugoslavia) Senad Karač
- (Socialist Federal Republic of Yugoslavia) Zoltan Kujundžić
- (Socialist Federal Republic of Yugoslavia) Zoran Kuntić
- (Socialist Federal Republic of Yugoslavia) Slobodan Kustudić
- (Socialist Federal Republic of Yugoslavia) Ranko Leškov
- (Socialist Federal Republic of Yugoslavia) Dušan Maravić
- (Socialist Federal Republic of Yugoslavia) Nenad Maslovar
- (Socialist Federal Republic of Yugoslavia) Dragan Miranović
- (Socialist Federal Republic of Yugoslavia) Tihomir Ognjanov
- (Socialist Federal Republic of Yugoslavia) Bela Palfi
- (Socialist Federal Republic of Yugoslavia) Antal Puhalak
- (Socialist Federal Republic of Yugoslavia) Zvonko Rašić
- (Socialist Federal Republic of Yugoslavia) Antun Rudinski
- (Socialist Federal Republic of Yugoslavia) Živko Slijepčević
- (Socialist Federal Republic of Yugoslavia) Dimitrije Stefanović
- (Socialist Federal Republic of Yugoslavia) Miloš Stojiljković
- (Socialist Federal Republic of Yugoslavia) Slobodan Šujica
- (Socialist Federal Republic of Yugoslavia) Jožef Takač
- (Socialist Federal Republic of Yugoslavia) Antal Tapiška
- (Socialist Federal Republic of Yugoslavia) Tomislav Taušan
- (Chinese Taipei) Tim Chow
- (Croatia) Risto Ivković
- (Croatia) Ivo Šeparović
- (Ghana) Edmund Addo
- (Hong Kong) Dejan Antonić
- (Hungary) Zsombor Kerekes
- (Hungary) Flórián Urbán
- (Kazakhstan) Maxim Fedin
- (Japan) Noboru Shimura
- (Montenegro) Nikola Drinčić
- (Montenegro) Vladimir Jovović
- (Montenegro) Mladen Kašćelan
- (Montenegro) Nemanja Nikolić
- (Montenegro) Savo Pavićević
- (Montenegro) Milan Purović
- (Montenegro) Janko Tumbasević
- (Montenegro) Nikola Vujović
- (Montenegro) Andrija Vukčević
- (Tanzania) Morice Abraham

For the list of all current and former players with Wikipedia article, please see: Category:FK Spartak Subotica players.

== Kit manufacturers and shirt sponsors ==
| Period | Kit Manufacturer | Shirt Sponsor |
|---|---|---|
| 2002–08 | Lotto | |
| 2008–11 | Lotto | Zlatibor Voda |
| 2011–12 | Nike | Zlatibor Voda |
| 2012–13 | Erreà | Zlatibor Voda |
| 2015– | Legea | Ždrepčeva Krv |
