= Savino =

Savino may refer to:

- Savino (surname)

== Given name ==
- Savino Pezzotta (born 1943), Italian trade unionist and politician
- Savino Guglielmetti (1911–2006), Italian gymnast
- Savino Bellini (1913–1974), Italian footballer
- Savino Bernardo Maria Cazzaro Bertollo (1924–2017)
- Savino Bratton, a character from the television drama The Wire

== Places ==
- Savino, Russia, name of several inhabited localities in Russia
- Bolshoye Savino Airport, Russia
- Bolshoye Savino, Russia
- Lupche-Savino River
- Lake Lupche-Savino, Russia
- Savino Selo (literally Savino village), Serbia
- Costa San Savino, Italy
- Monte San Savino, Italy

== See also ==
- Savinio, Italian comune
- Saint-Savin (disambiguation)
- A.C. Sansovino
