= Savino (surname) =

Savino is a surname, derived from the Italian name of Sabinus of Spoleto, a 3rd-century saint. People with this surname include:

- Alberto Savino, Italian footballer
- Alessio di Savino, Italian boxer
- Chris Savino, American animator, creator of The Loud House
- Diane Savino, American politician
- Domenico Savino, Italian conductor later resided in the United States
- Francesco Savino (born 1954), Italian Catholic bishop
- Joseph J. Savino, American politician
- Michele Savino, American shoemaker
- Nicola Savino, Italian radio host, television presenter, television author, ...
- Nicola Savino (politician), Italian politician
- Joseph S. Savino, American physician

== See also ==
- Saint-Savin (disambiguation)
