= Savin =

Savin may refer to:

- Savin (name)
- Juniperus sabina, or savin, a shrubby juniper plant
- Savin (photocopiers), a photocopier company acquired by Ricoh
- Savin, Bulgaria, a village in Kubrat Municipality, Razgrad Province
- SAVIN, Statewide Automated Victim Information & Notification

== See also ==
- Savin Hill, a neighborhood of Boston, Massachusetts, USA
- Savin Hill (album) by the Street Dogs
- Savin Rock, a section of West Haven, Connecticut, USA
- Saint-Savin (disambiguation), one of four communes of France
