= Kosančić =

Kosančić may refer to:

- Kosančić, Bojnik, village in the municipality of Bojnik, Serbia
- Kosančić, Vrbas, village in the municipality of Vrbas, Serbia
- Ivan Kosančić (died 1389), Serbian knight
