= Vrbas, Serbia =

Vrbas Врбас (Serbian) Verbász (Hungarian) Вербас (Pannonian Rusyn)
- Town and municipality
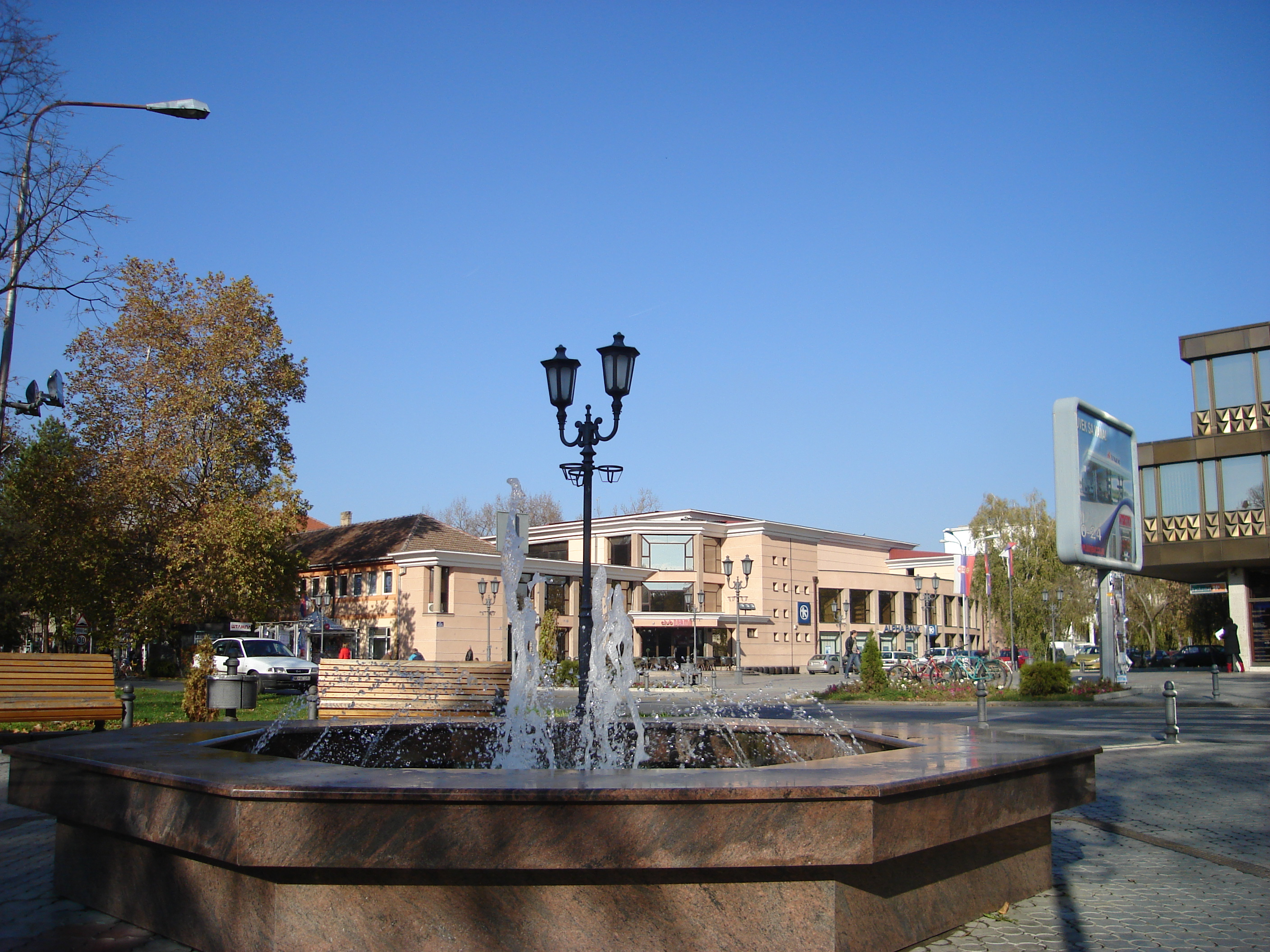
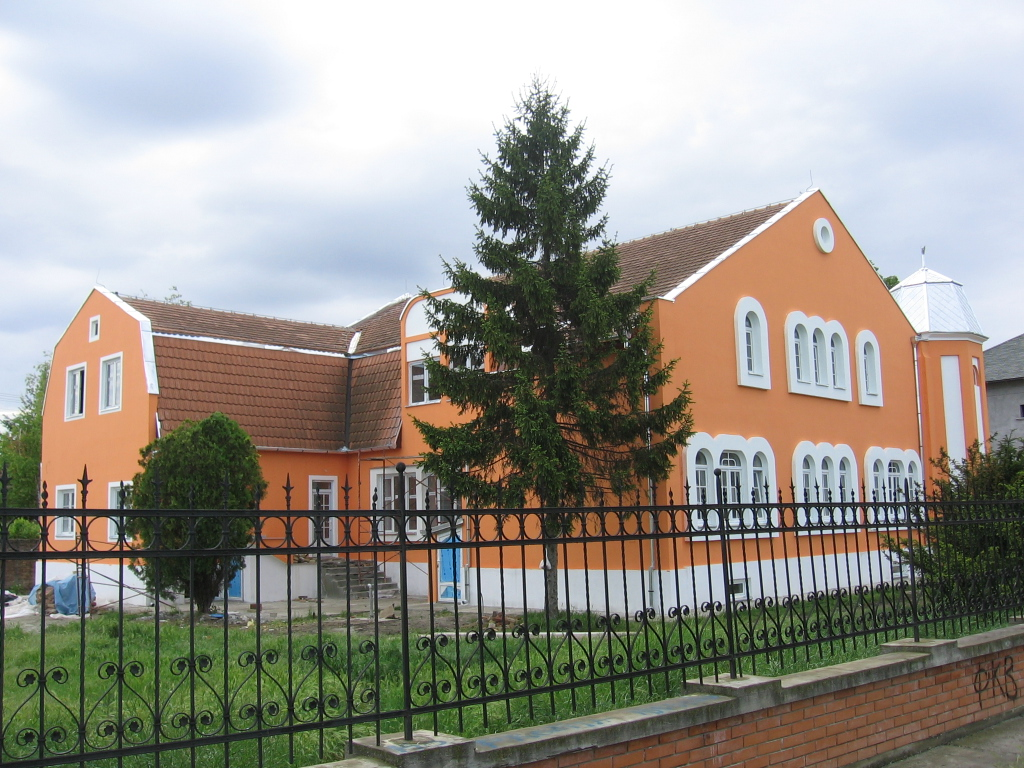
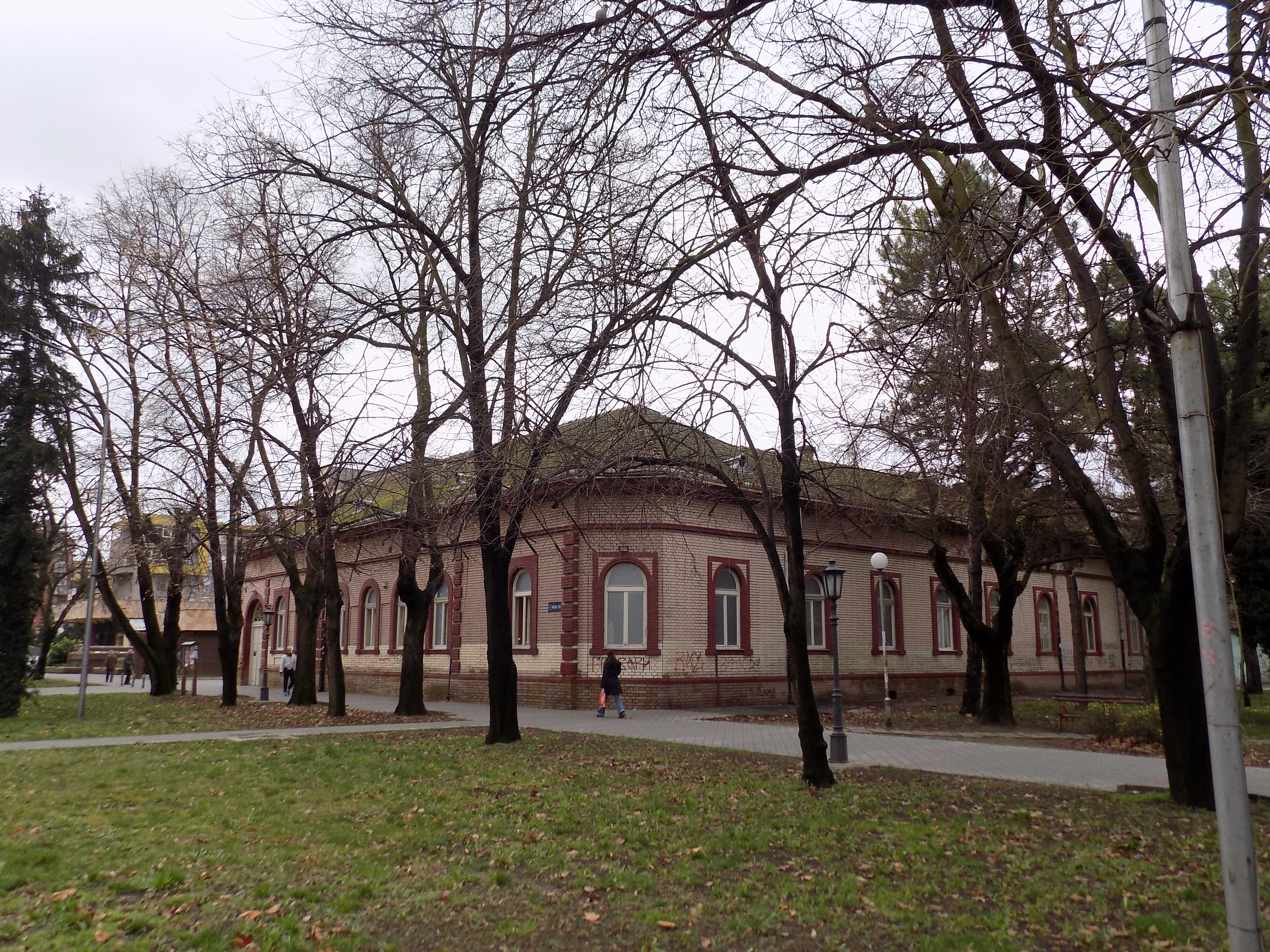
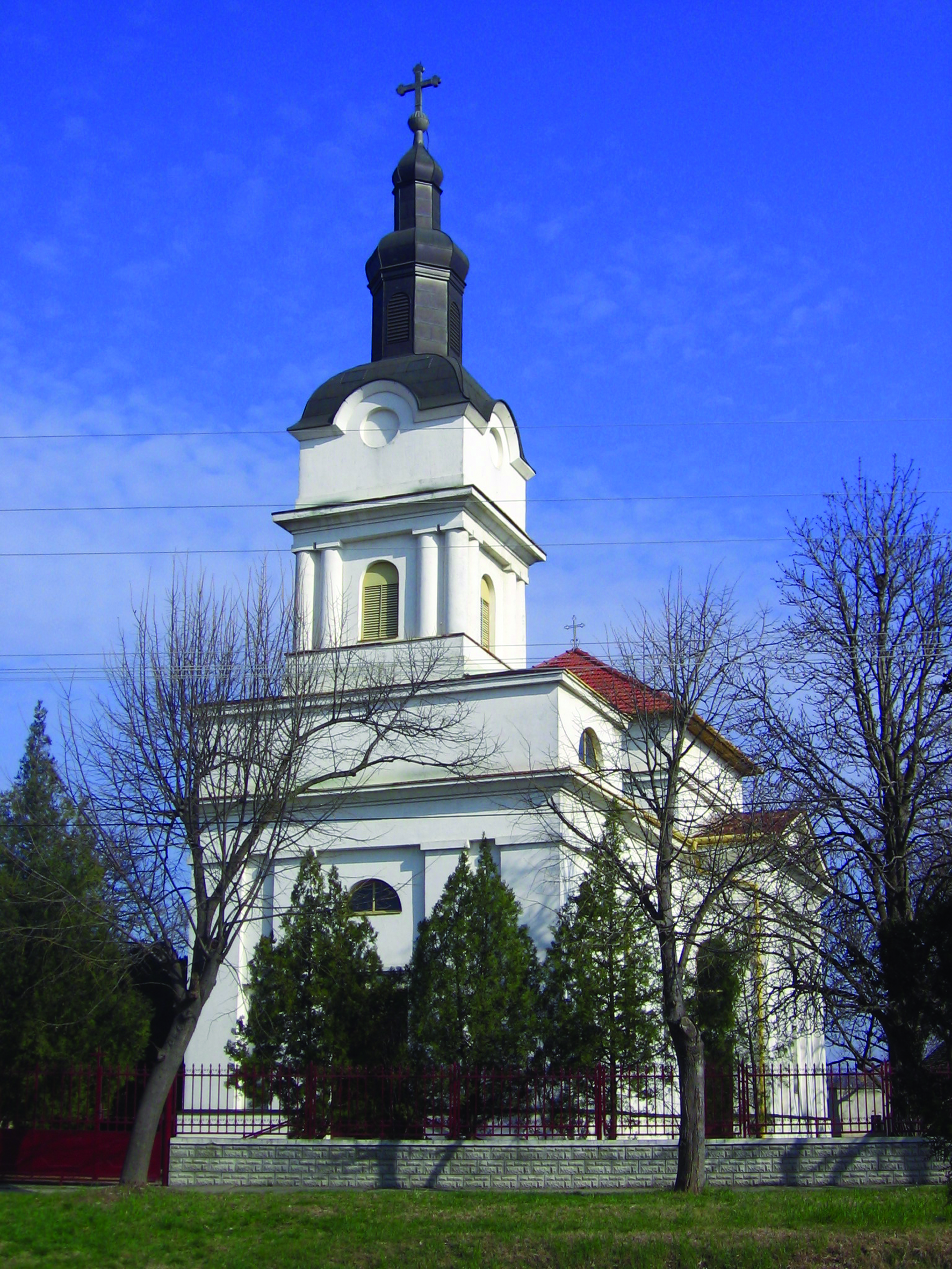
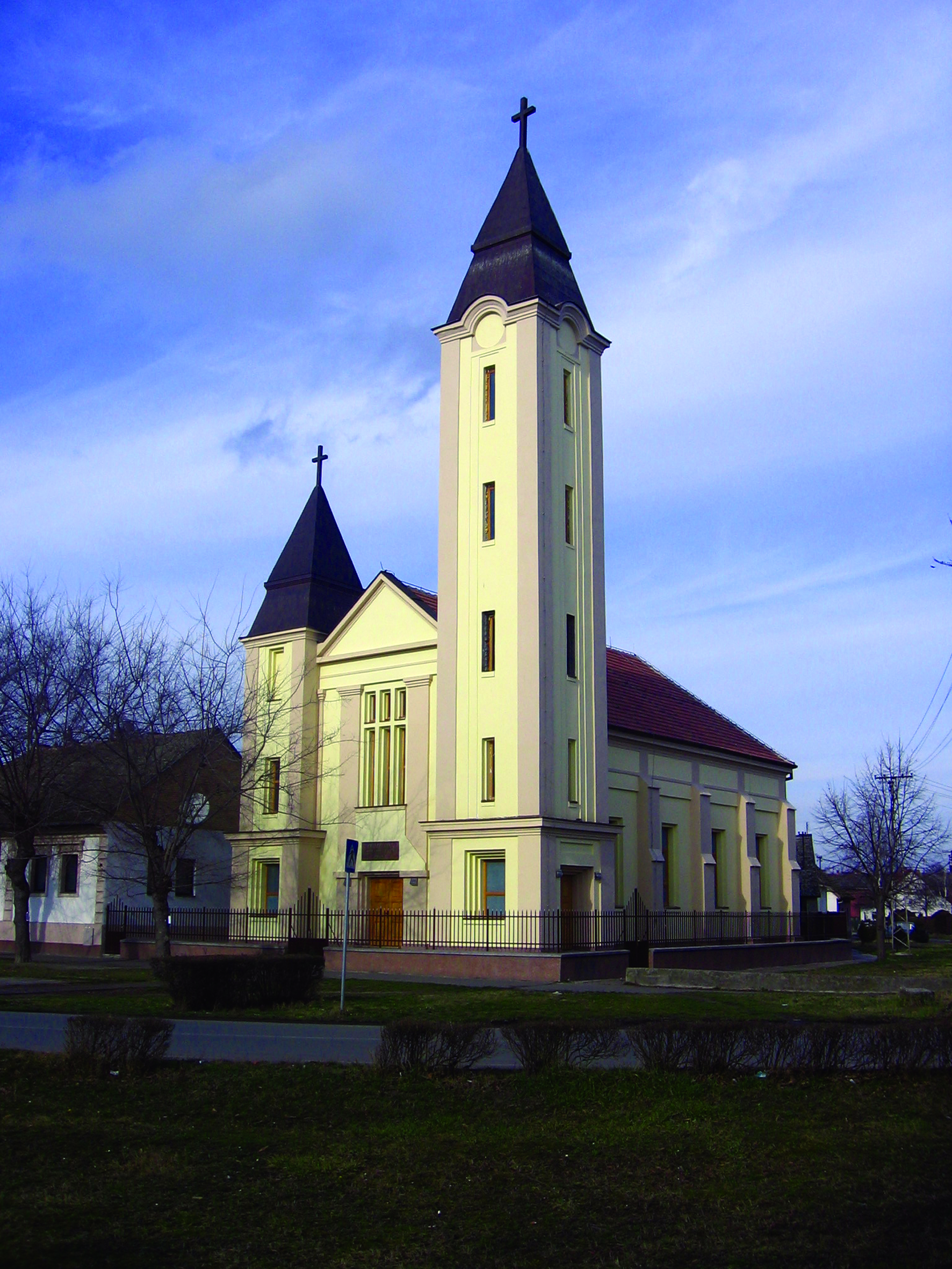
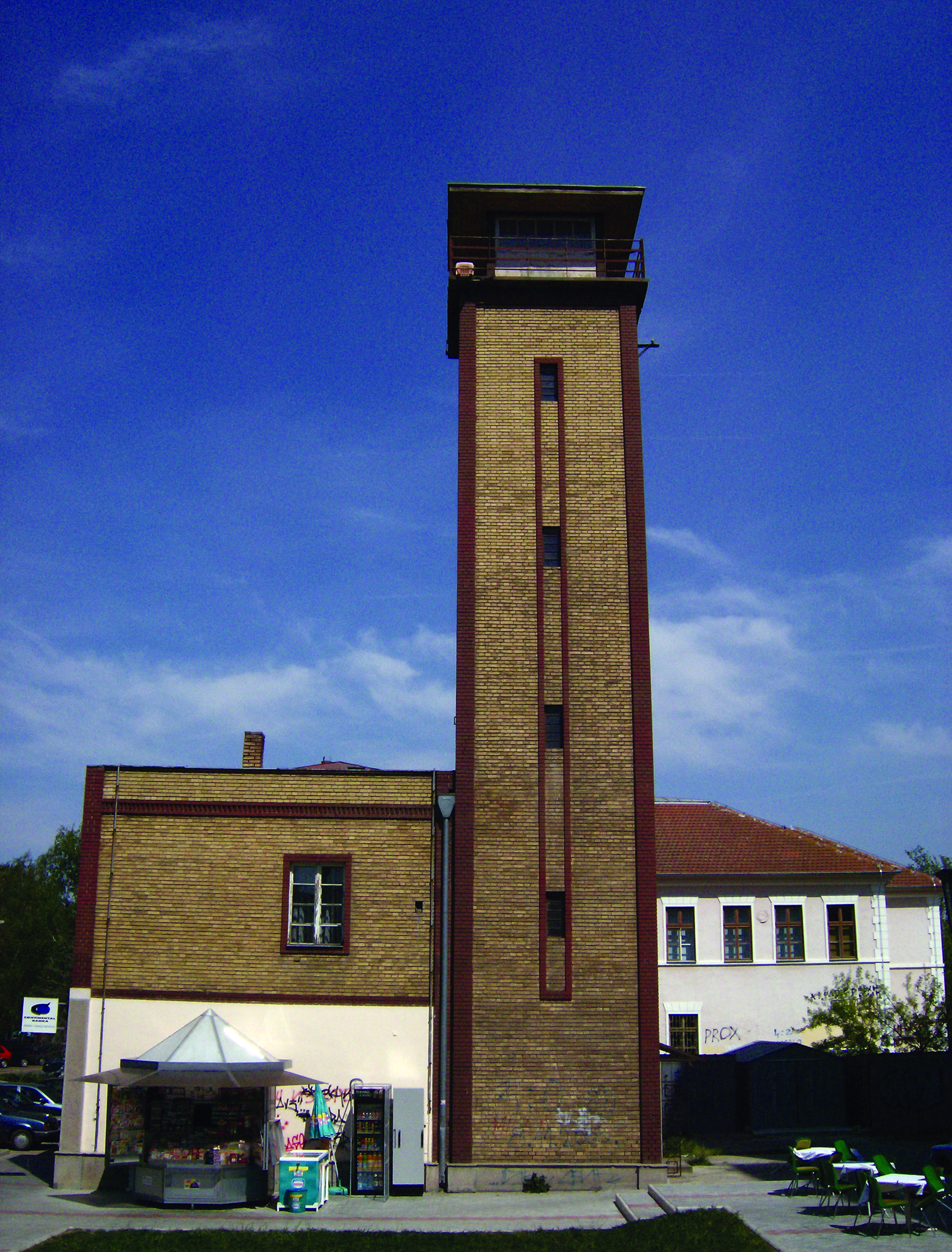
- From top: Fountain in the center of Vrbas, Villa "Tabori", Vrbas Museum, The Greek Catholic Church, Methodist-evangelical church, Building of volunteer firefighting company

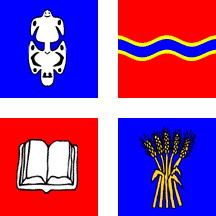
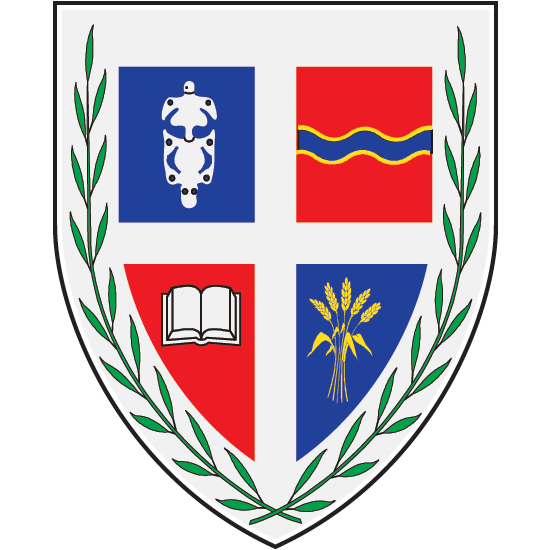
- Flag Coat of arms

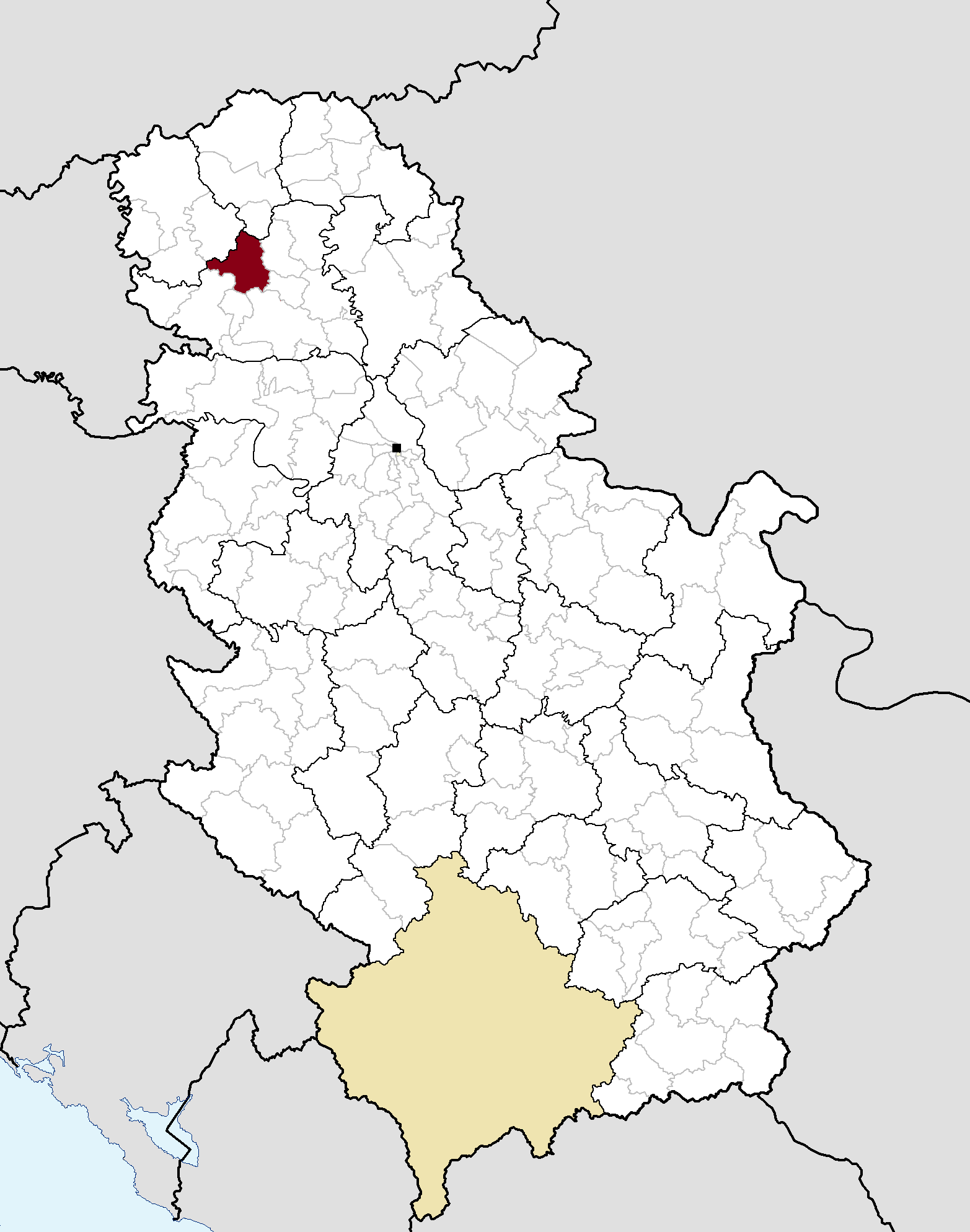
- Location of the municipality of Vrbas within Serbia
- Coordinates: 45°34′N 19°39′E
- Country: Serbia
- Province: Vojvodina
- District: South Bačka
- Settlements: 7

Government
  - Mayor: Milan Glušac (SNS)

Area
  - Municipality: 376 km^{2} (145 sq mi)
- Elevation: 85 m (279 ft)

Population (2022 census)
  - Town: 20,892
  - Municipality: 36,601
- Time zone: UTC+1 (CET)
  - Summer (DST): UTC+2 (CEST)
- Postal code: 21460
- Area code: +381 21
- Car plates: VS
- Official languages: Serbian together with Hungarian and Pannonian Rusyn
- Website: www.vrbas.net

Vrbas (Serbian Cyrillic: Врбас) is a town and municipality located in the South Bačka District of the autonomous province of Vojvodina, Serbia. As of 2022, the town has a population of 20,892, while the municipality has 36,601 inhabitants.

== Name ==
Its name stems from the word for 'willow' in Serbian. During the SFRY period, the town was renamed Titov Vrbas (meaning 'Tito's Vrbas'), after Josip Broz Tito. Like all other towns in communist Yugoslavia named after Tito, the first part was dropped once the new states were formed during the early 1990s.

In Rusyn, the town is known as Вербас, in Hungarian as Verbász, in Croatian as Vrbas, in German as Werbass, and in Turkish as Verbas.

== History ==
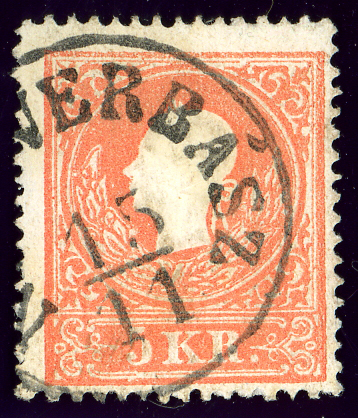
NEU-VERBASZ in the Empire of Austria in 1859

Vrbas was mentioned first in 1213 during the administration of the Kingdom of Hungary. According to other sources, it was mentioned first in 1387. In the 16th century it became a part of the Ottoman Empire. During Ottoman administration it was populated by ethnic Serbs.

Since the Treaty of Passarowitz (1718), Vrbas and the Banat were placed under administration of the Habsburg monarchy. According to the 1720 census, it was populated exclusively by Serbs (about 250 families).

After 1784 many Germans settled in the town founding a new settlement named Novi Vrbas (Neu-Verbasz) near the old Serb settlement, which then became known as Stari Vrbas (Old Vrbas).

In 1910, population of Novi Vrbas was mostly composed of ethnic Germans, while population of Stari Vrbas was ethnically mixed and was mainly composed of Serbs and Germans.

In 1918, Vrbas became part of the Kingdom of Serbs, Croats and Slovenes, which was later renamed to Yugoslavia. The town was under Axis occupation in 1941–1944, and during that time it was attached to Horthy's Hungary. As a consequence of the World War II events in Yugoslavia, the German population fled from the town after this war. At the same time, many settlers from Montenegro came to Vrbas and other neighboring places.

== Inhabited places ==
Vrbas municipality includes the city of Vrbas and the following villages:

- Bačko Dobro Polje
- Zmajevo
- Kosančić
- Kucura
- Ravno Selo
- Savino Selo

== Demographics ==
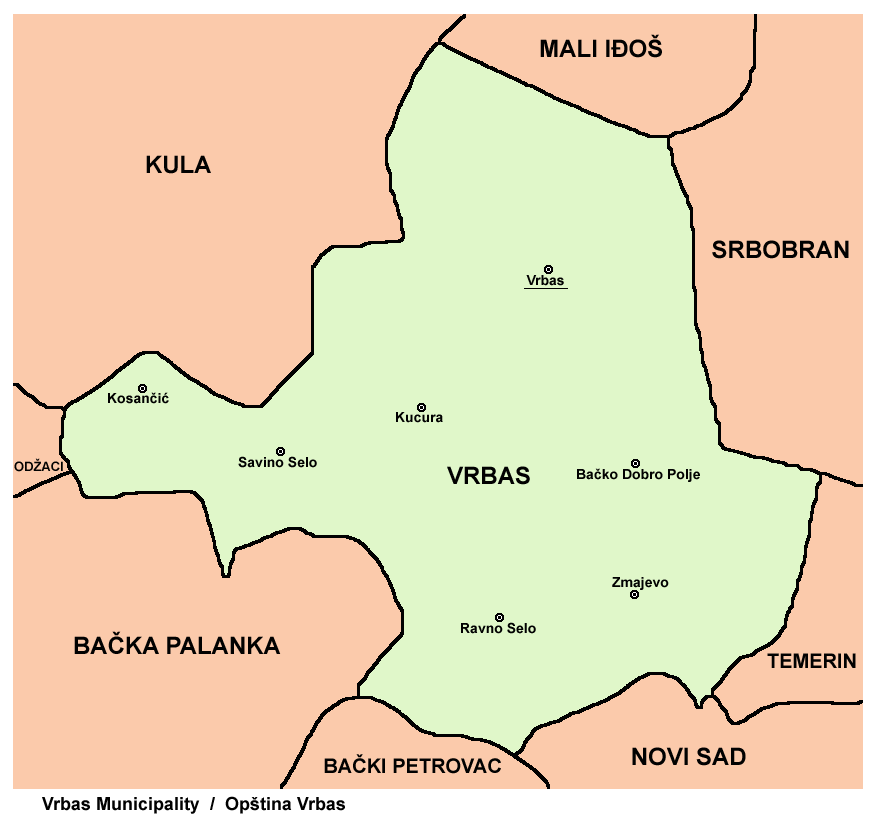
Map of Vrbas municipality

Historical population
Year	Pop.	±% p.a.
1948	37,174	—
1953	37,614	+0.24%
1961	42,853	+1.64%
1971	43,490	+0.15%
1981	45,756	+0.51%
1991	46,405	+0.14%
2002	45,852	−0.11%
2011	42,092	−0.95%
2022	36,601	−1.26%

According to the 2022 census results, the municipality has 36,601 inhabitants.

=== Ethnic groups ===
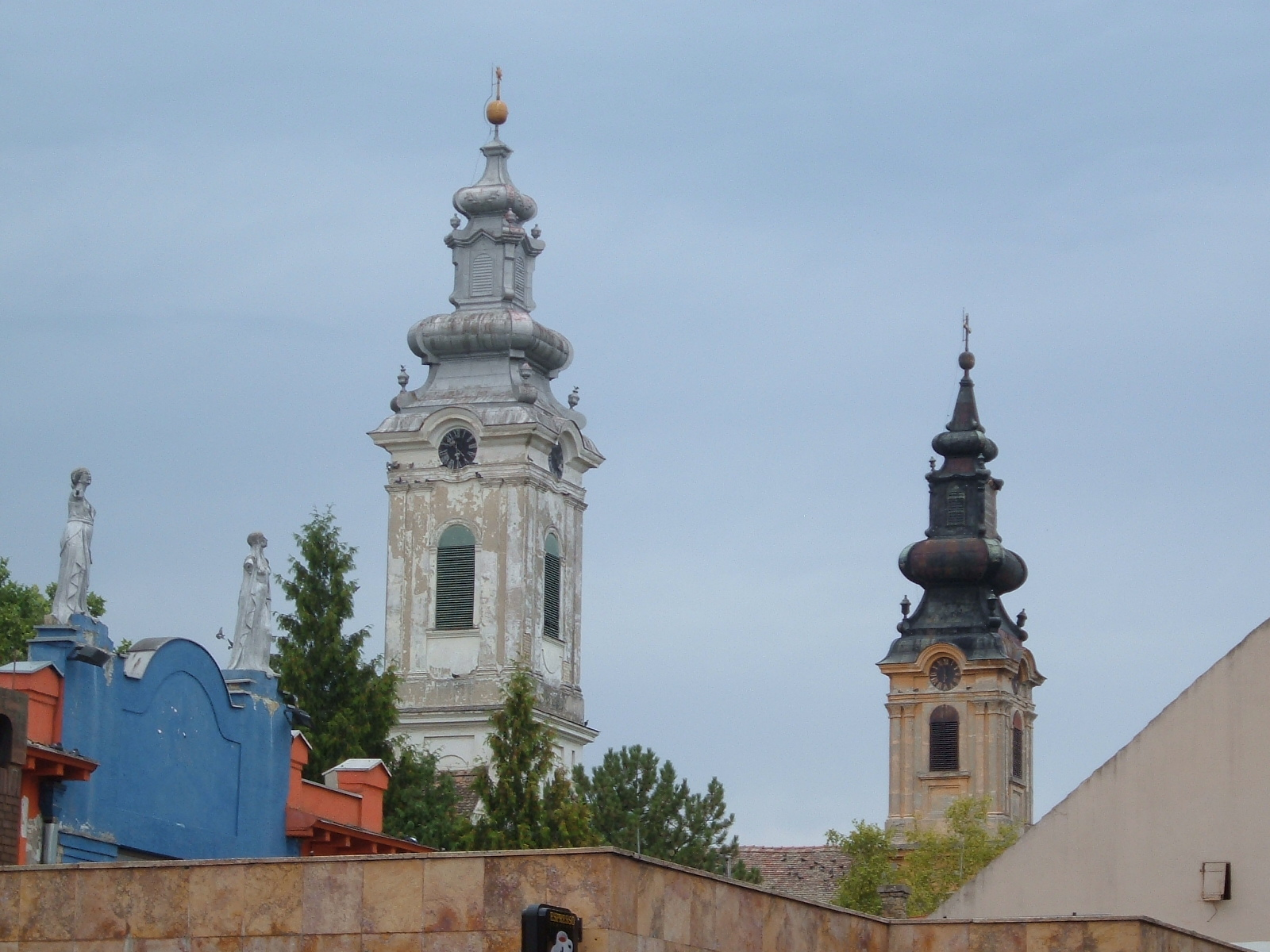
Churches in Vrbas.

Settlements with Serb ethnic majority are: Bačko Dobro Polje, Zmajevo, Kosančić, Ravno Selo and Vrbas. Ethnically mixed settlements are: Kucura (with relative Rusyn majority) and Savino Selo (with relative Montenegrin majority).

The ethnic composition of the municipality:

Ethnicity	Population	Share
Serbs	22,739	62.1%
Montenegrins	4,264	11.6%
Rusyns	2,833	7.7%
Hungarians	1,949	5.3%
Ukrainians	626	1.7%
Croats	379	1.%
Roma	336	0.9%
Slovaks	256	0.7%
Yugoslavs	151	0.4%
Macedonians	119	0.3%
Muslims	112	0.3%
Others	2,837	7.7%
Total	36,601	

== Economy ==
The following table gives a preview of total number of registered people employed in legal entities per their core activity (as of 2018):

Activity	Total
Agriculture, forestry and fishing	385
Mining and quarrying	-
Manufacturing	2,710
Electricity, gas, steam and air conditioning supply	91
Water supply; sewerage, waste management and remediation activities	193
Construction	188
Wholesale and retail trade, repair of motor vehicles and motorcycles	1,326
Transportation and storage	806
Accommodation and food services	259
Information and communication	74
Financial and insurance activities	125
Real estate activities	12
Professional, scientific and technical activities	249
Administrative and support service activities	516
Public administration and defense; compulsory social security	547
Education	661
Human health and social work activities	1,081
Arts, entertainment and recreation	191
Other service activities	117
Individual agricultural workers	270
Total	9,802

== Notable citizens ==
- Károly Molter, Hungarian writer (1890–1981)
- Vida Ognjenović, writer and director (b. 1941)
- Desanka Pešut, sports shooter (1941–2021)
- Lazar Ristovski, actor (b. 1952)
- Radoman Božović, politician and former Prime Minister of Serbia (b. 1953)
- Miodrag Kostić, businessman (b. 1959)
- Svetozar Šapurić, footballer (b. 1960)
- Igor Marojević, Serbian writer (b. 1968)
- Milorad Mažić, football referee (b. 1973)
- Ivan Kostić, politician (b. 1975)
- Magdolna Rúzsa, Hungarian singer (b. 1985)
- Nikola Komazec, footballer (b. 1987)
- Ljubomir Fejsa, footballer (b. 1988)
- Bianka Buša, volleyball player (b. 1994)
- Maša Janković, basketball player (b. 2000)
- Milos Kerkez, Hungarian footballer for Liverpool F.C. (b. 2003)

== Gallery ==
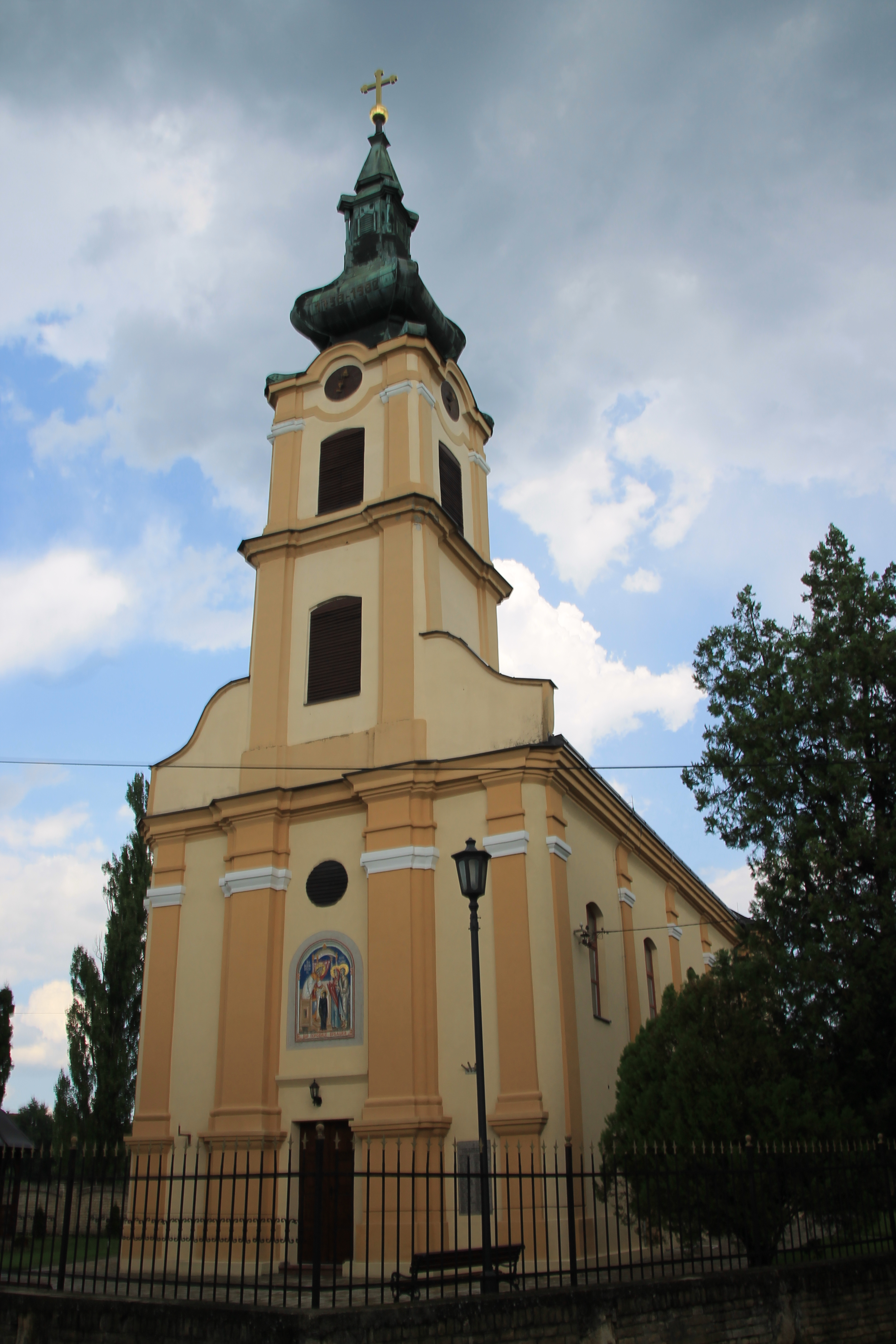
The Serbian Orthodox church in Vrbas (erected in 1738), the oldest church and also the oldest preserved building in Vrbas

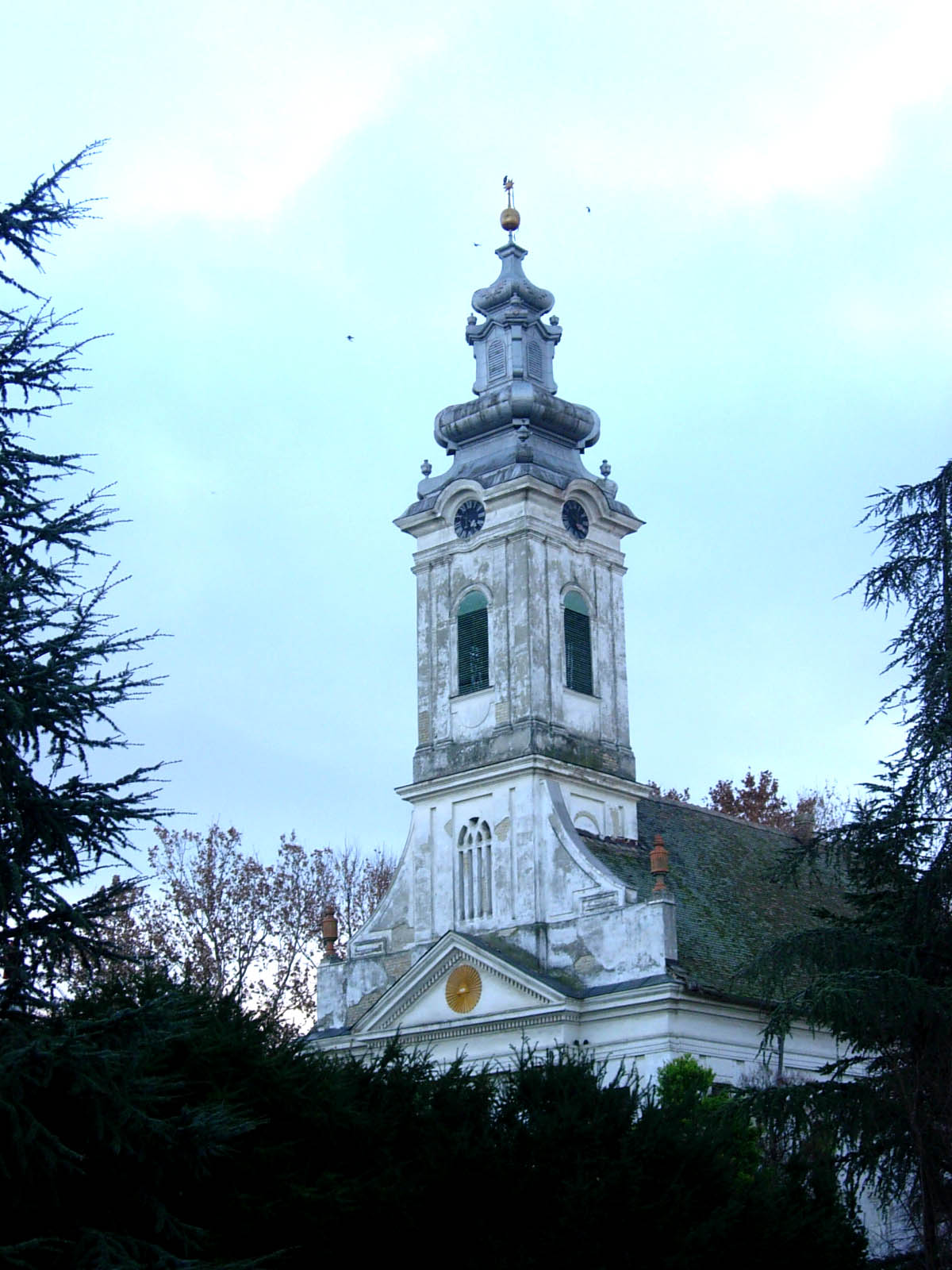
The Calvinist church (est. 1824).

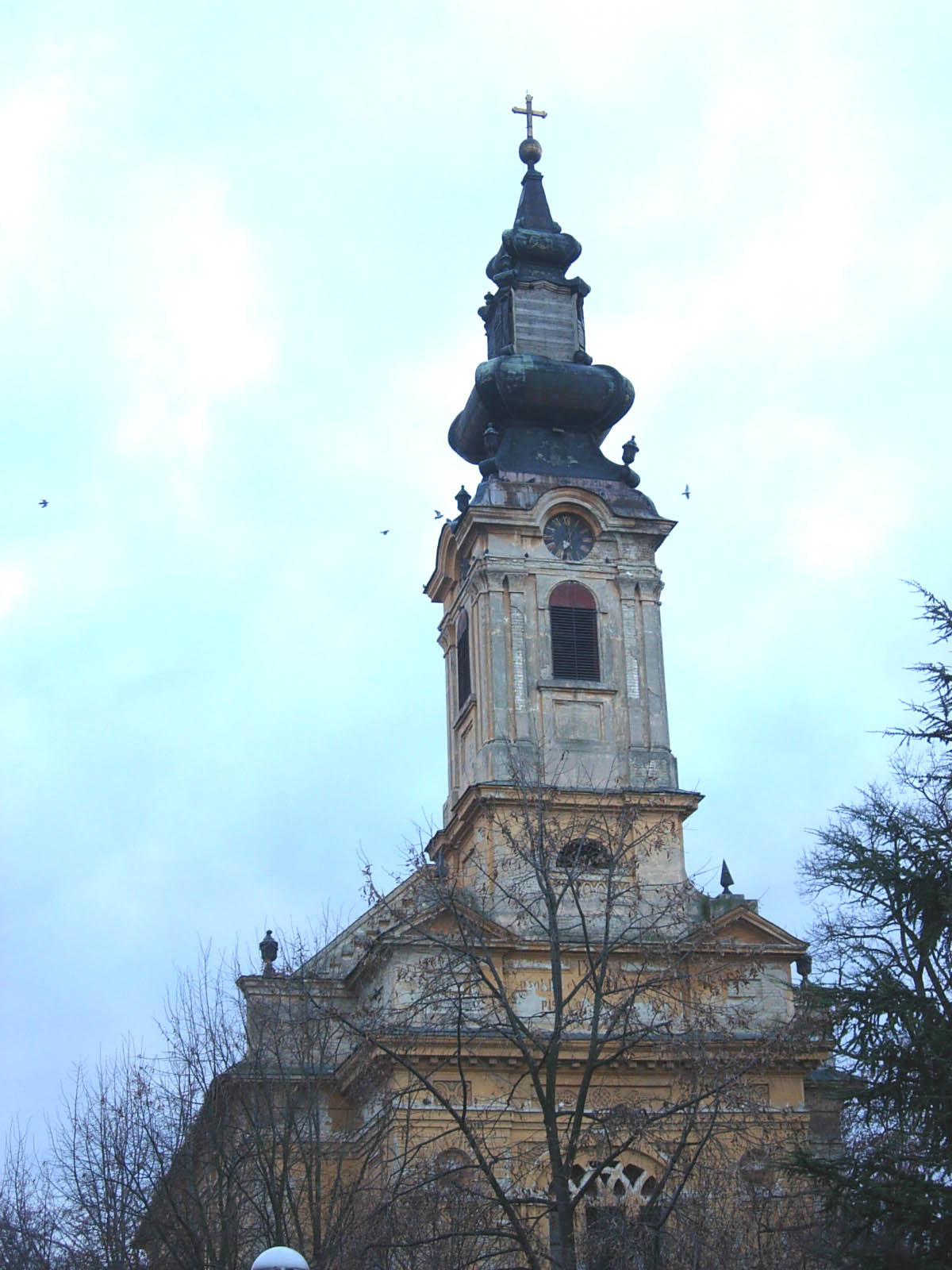
The Evangelical church (est. 1820).

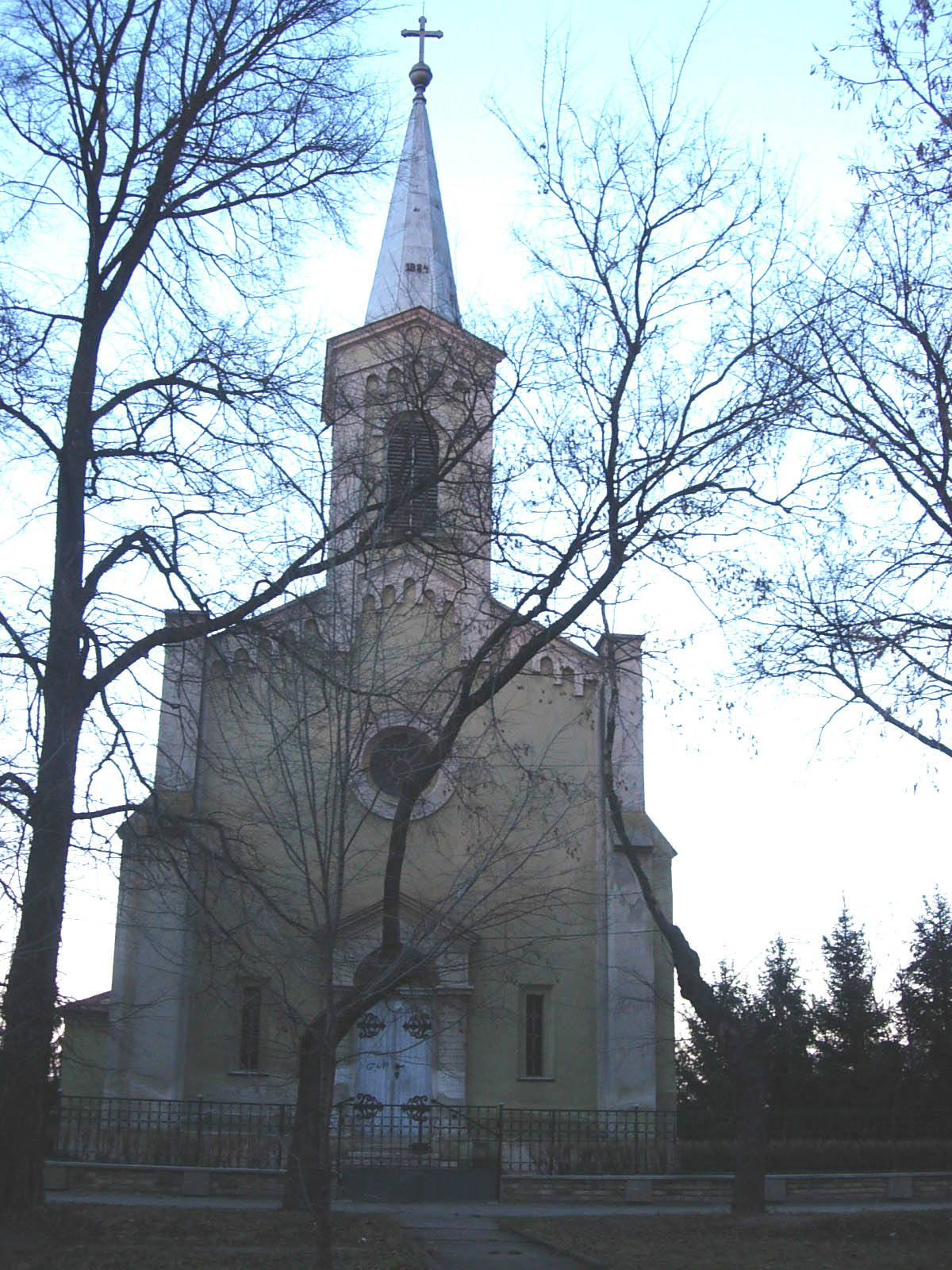
The Immaculate Conception of Blessed Virgin Mary Catholic Church (est. 1884).

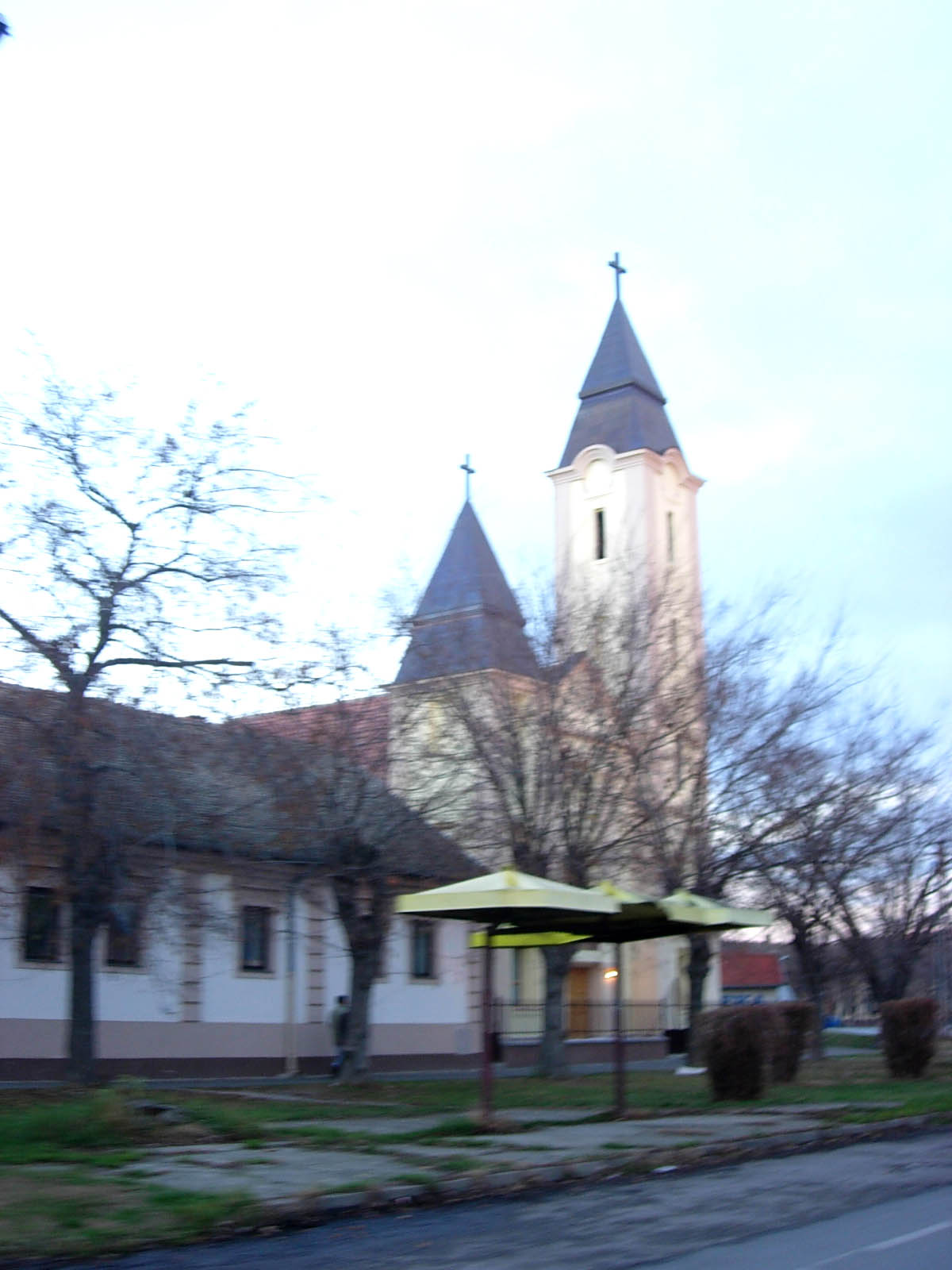
The Methodist church (est. 1922).

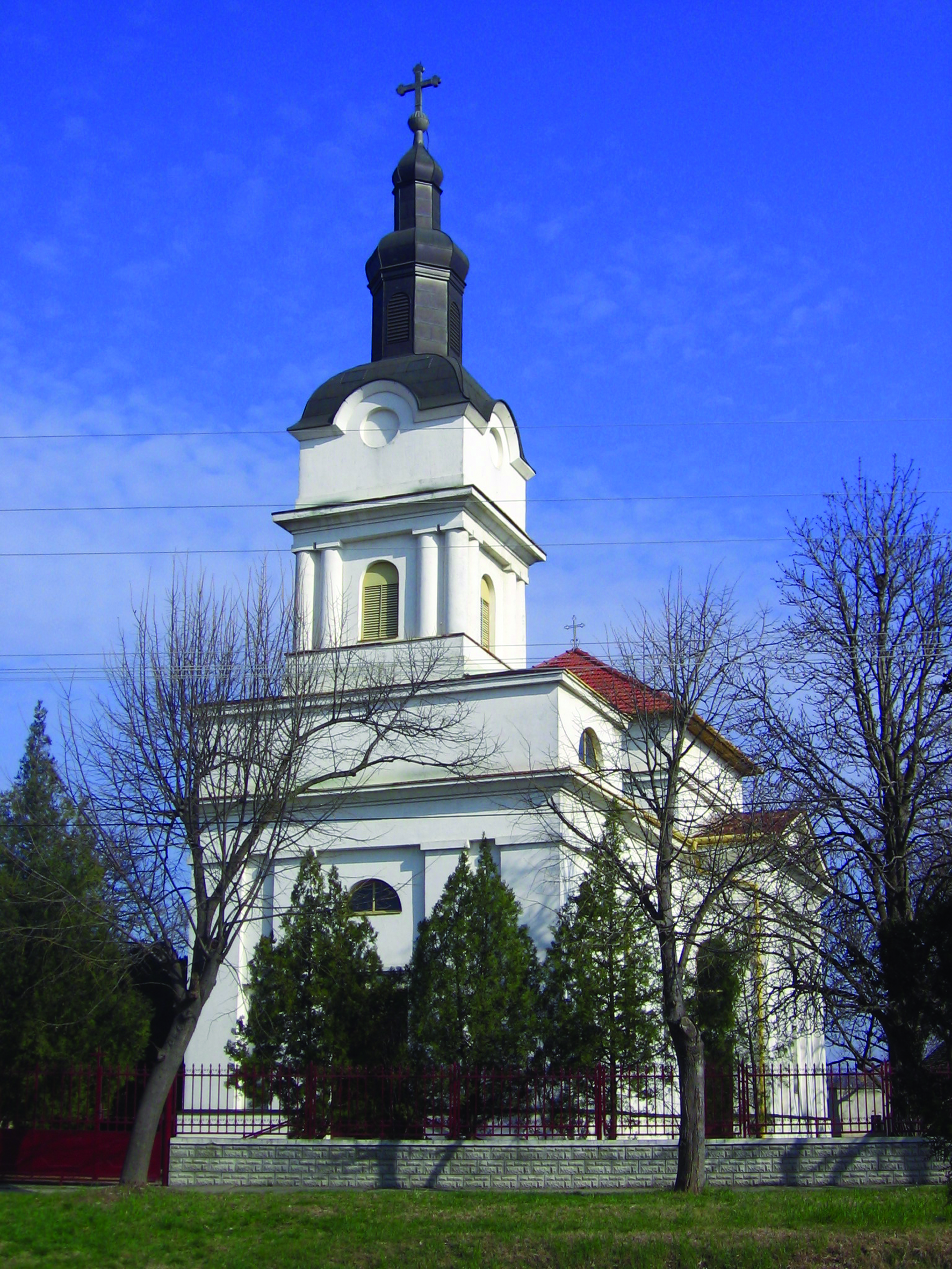
The Rusyn Greek Catholic Church (est. 1945).

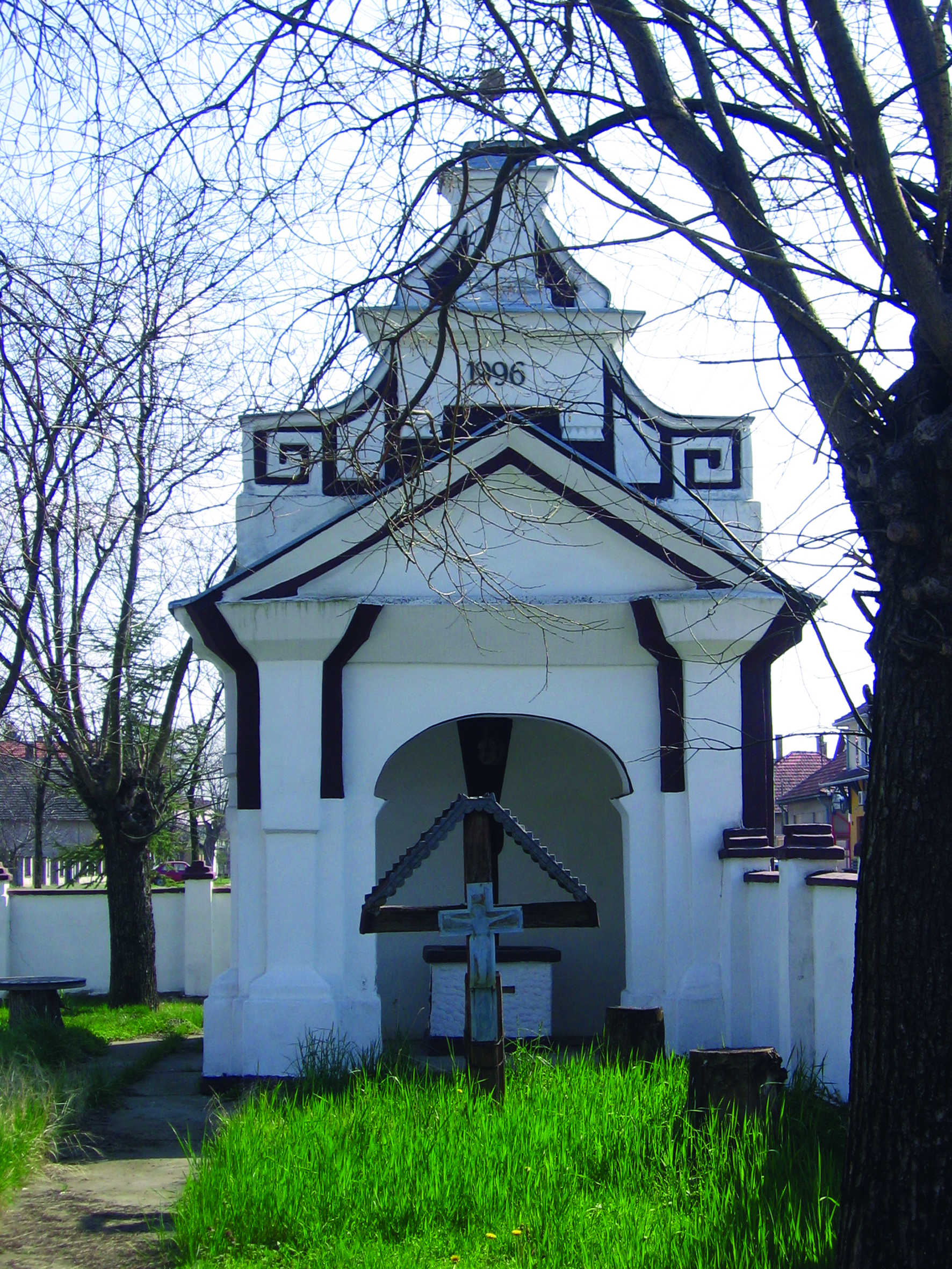
Vodice Chapel in Vrbas (est. 1794).

== See also ==
- Municipalities of Serbia
- South Bačka District
- Bačka
- List of places in Serbia
- List of cities, towns and villages in Vojvodina
