= Kosančić, Vrbas =

Kosančić Косанчић (Serbian) Péklapuszta (Hungarian)
- Village (Selo)
- Location within Vojvodina Location within Serbia Location within Europe
- Coordinates: 45°31′49″N 19°27′19″E
- Country: Serbia
- Province: Vojvodina
- Region: Bačka (Podunavlje)
- District: South Bačka
- Municipality: Vrbas

Population (2002)
  - Total: 163
- Time zone: UTC+1 (CET)
  - Summer (DST): UTC+2 (CEST)

Kosančić (Serbian Cyrillic: Косанчић; Hungarian: Péklapuszta) is a village in Serbia. It is situated in the Vrbas municipality, South Bačka District, Vojvodina province. The village has a Serb ethnic majority and its population numbering 163 people (2002 census).

== Geography ==
Kosančić is located between Savino Selo, Pivnice, Lalić, Ruski Krstur and Kula. Today, Kosančić is regarded as separate settlement, but formerly, it was officially regarded as part of Savino Selo.

== Ethnic groups (2002 census) ==
- Serbs = 93
- Hungarians = 15
- Croats = 8
- Montenegrins = 7
- Ukrainians = 7
- Slovaks = 3
- Slovenians = 2
- ethnic Muslims = 1
- Rusyns = 1
- other = 1
- undeclared = 22
- regional affiliation = 1
- unknown = 2

== See also ==
- List of places in Serbia
- List of cities, towns and villages in Vojvodina
