= Savino, Russia =

Name of several Russian rural localities

Savino (Russian: Са́вино) is the name of several inhabited localities in Russia:

== Ivanovo Oblast ==
One urban and three rural localities in Ivanovo Oblast bear this name.

Urban localities

- Savino (urban locality), Savinsky District, Ivanovo Oblast, a settlement in Savinsky District

Rural localities

- Savino, Ilyinsky District, Ivanovo Oblast, a village in Ilyinsky District
- Savino, Komsomolsky District, Ivanovo Oblast, a village in Komsomolsky District
- Savino (rural locality), Savinsky District, Ivanovo Oblast, a village in Savinsky District

== Udmurt Republic ==
One rural locality in the Udmurt Republic bears this name:

- Savino, Udmurt Republic, a village in Kambarsky District

== Other ==
There are other rural localities in Russia that bear this name.
