= Lupche Bay =

Bay of the White Sea, Russia

Coordinates: 67°08′25″N 32°21′54″E

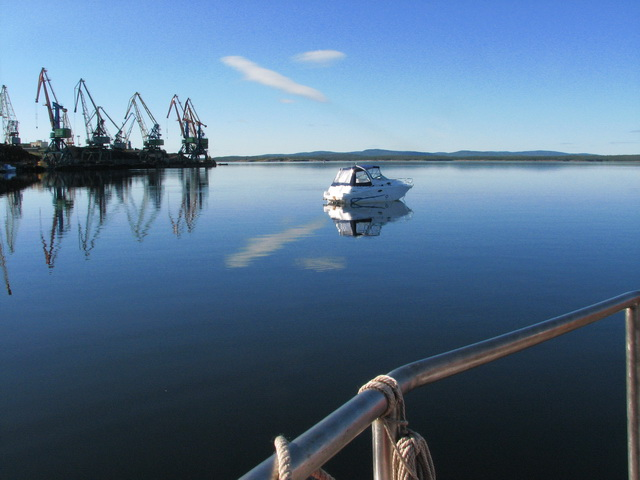

Lupche Bay (Russian: Губа Лупче, Guba Lupche) is a body of water off the southwestern coast of the Kola Peninsula, Murmansk Oblast, Russia. Lupche-Savino River flows to the bay.
