= Savino, Komsomolsky District, Ivanovo Oblast =

Savino Савино
- Village
- Location within Ivanovo Oblast Location within Russia
- Coordinates: 57°01′N 40°06′E
- Country: Russia
- Region: Ivanovo Oblast
- District: Komsomolsky District
- Time zone: UTC+3:00

Savino (Russian: Савино) is a rural locality (a village) in Komsomolsky District, Ivanovo Oblast, Russia. Population: 29 (2010 census);

== Geography ==
This rural locality is located 17 kilometres (11 mi) from Komsomolsk (the district's administrative centre), 53 kilometres (33 mi) from Ivanovo (capital of Ivanovo Oblast) and 206 kilometres (128 mi) from Moscow. Domantsevo is the nearest rural locality.
