= Michele Savino =

American ballet shoes designer and maker

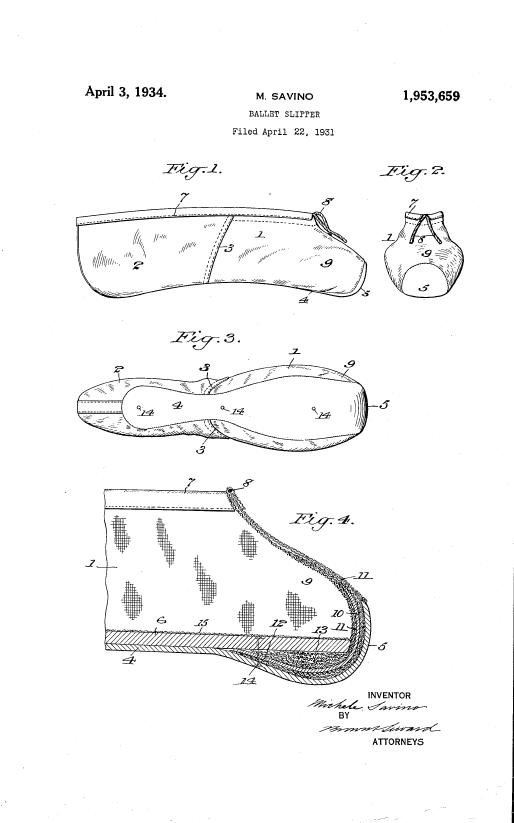
Ballet Slipper Drawing

Michele Savino was a Broadway-based shoemaker and designer of ballet slippers. His clientele included the famed dancer Marilyn Miller, for whom he designed pointe shoes. According to appraiser Elyse Luray, this placed him at the "peak of his profession". He owned a shop located at 324 West 42nd Street. In April 1931, he filed a patent for a ballet slipper intended to contain "a structure which is light in weight, durable, and noiseless when in use." The patent was granted on April 3, 1934 (Pat No. 1,953,659).
