= Lake Lupche =

Lake in Murmansk Oblast, Russia

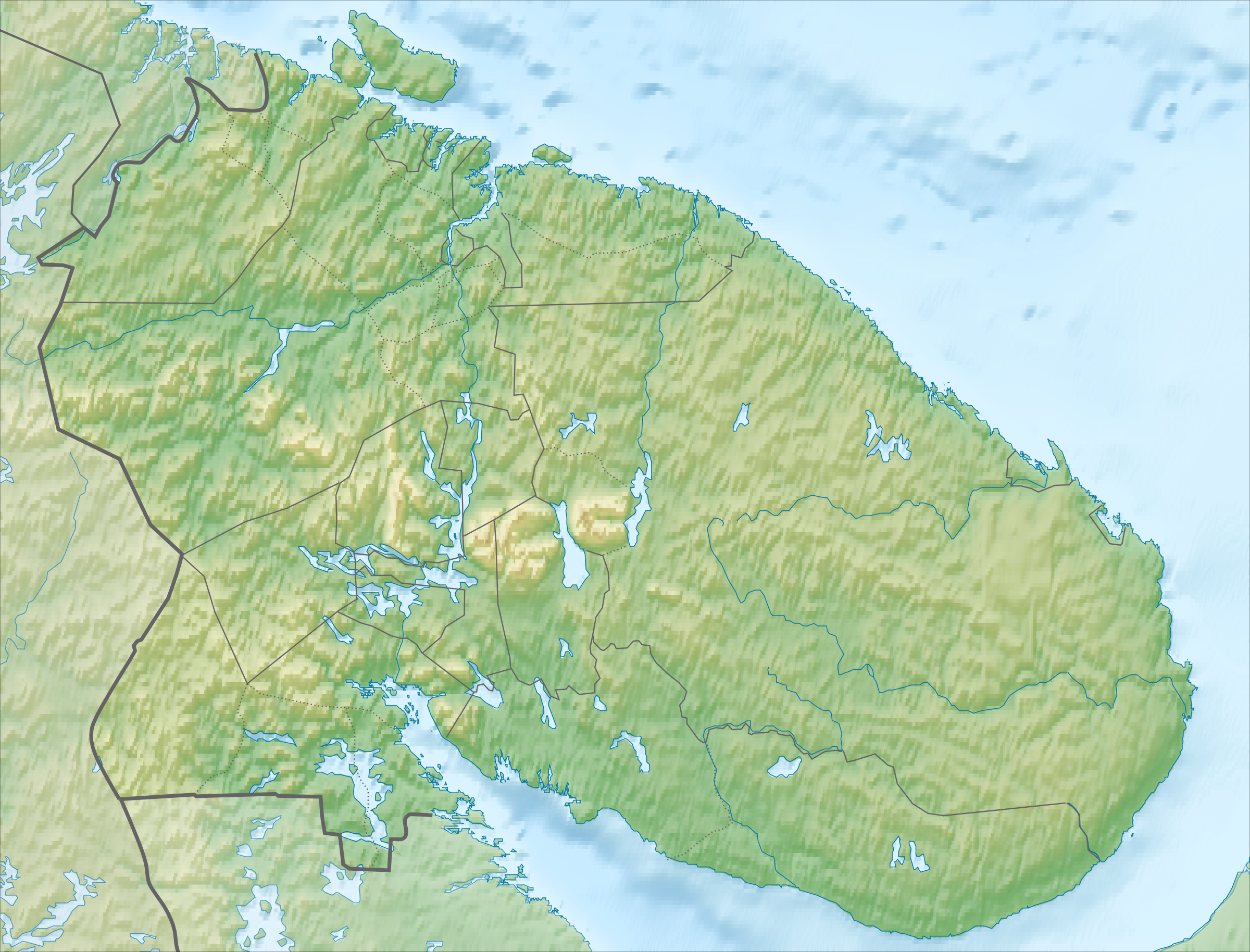
- Location within Murmansk Oblast Location within Russia
- Location: Kola Peninsula, Murmansk Oblast
- Coordinates: 67°10′41″N 32°21′38″E
- Primary outflows: Lupche-Savino River
- Basin countries: Russia
- Surface elevation: 23 m (75 ft)

Lake Lupche (Russian: Озеро Лупче) is a small lake on the Kola Peninsula, Murmansk Oblast, Russia near Kandalaksha. It has an elevation of 23.1 m. Lupche-Savino River flows from the lake.
