= Nicola Savino (politician) =

Italian politician (1937-2025)

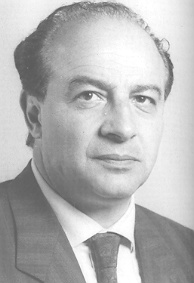

Member of the Chamber of Deputies
- In office 1987–1994
- Constituency: Basilicata

Personal details
- Born: 29 July 1937 Rivello, Province of Potenza, Italy
- Died: 30 June 2025 (aged 87)
- Party: Italian Socialist Party (PSI)
- Profession: Politician, teacher

Nicola Savino (29 July 1937 – 30 June 2025) was an Italian politician.

== Early life and career ==
Savino was born on 29 July 1937 in Rivello. Following a period working as a teacher, he organized the Italian Socialist Party (PSI) in the southern area of Basilicata.

== Political career ==
Savino was elected for the PSI in the province of Potenza in 1970, he was provincial councillor for assistance from 1973 to 1975.

He was then elected in the Basilicata region from 1975 to 1987: here he was councillor for Training and Culture, vice-president of the Regional Council and, from 1985 to 1987, councillor again with the vice-presidency of the Council and the delegation to Personnel.

In 1987, he was elected to the Chamber of Deputies. He was a member of the VII Commission, of the Elections Committee and president of the Commission of Inquiry on the Condition of Youth. He was then re-elected in Basilicata in 1992 with about 20,000 preferences out of 60,000 votes for the PSI. Confirmed in the VII and in the Junta, he was also vice-president of the I until his appointment as undersecretary for Health in the Ciampi government. He ended his parliamentary term in 1994.

== Death ==
Savino died on 30 June 2025, at the age of 87. His ashes were interred at the cemetery of Rivello on 2 July
