= Lupche-Savino =

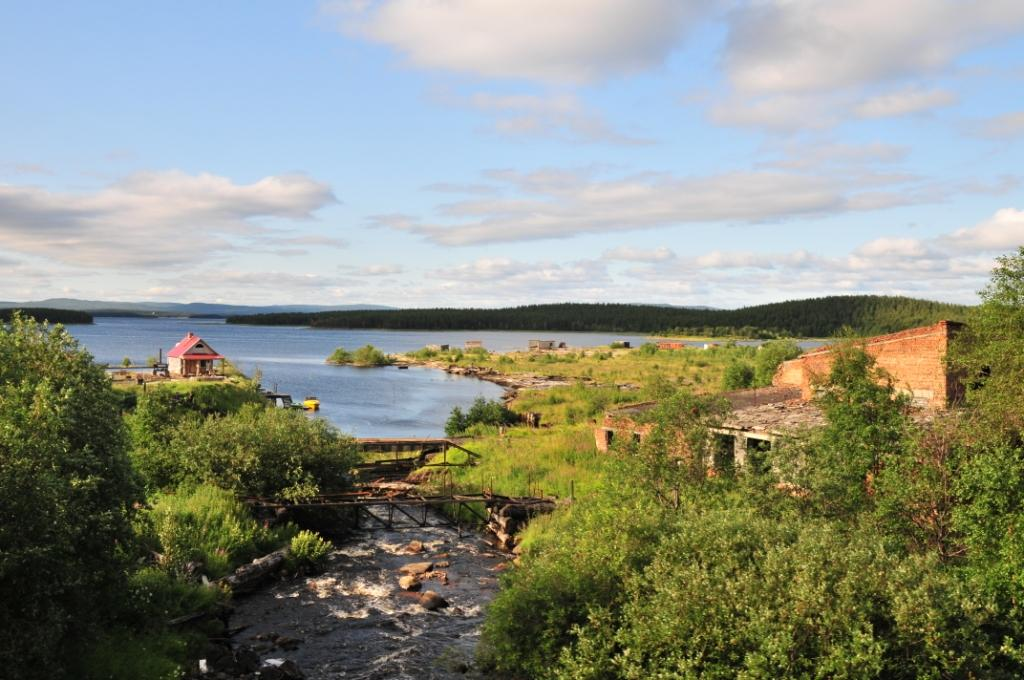
- Native name: Лупче-Савино (Russian)

Location
- Country: Russia
- Region: Murmansk Oblast

Physical characteristics
- Mouth: Kandalaksha Gulf
  - coordinates: 67.1587°N 32.3431°E
- Length: 15 km (9.3 mi)

The Lupche-Savino (Russian: Лупче-Савино) is a river in the south of the Kola Peninsula in Murmansk Oblast, Russia. It is 22 km long. The Lupche-Savino originates in the Lake Bolshoye Savino, flows through the smaller Lake Lupche and discharges into the Lupcha Bay of Kandalaksha Gulf.
