= Savino Selo =

Savino Selo Савино Село (Serbian)
- Village (Selo)
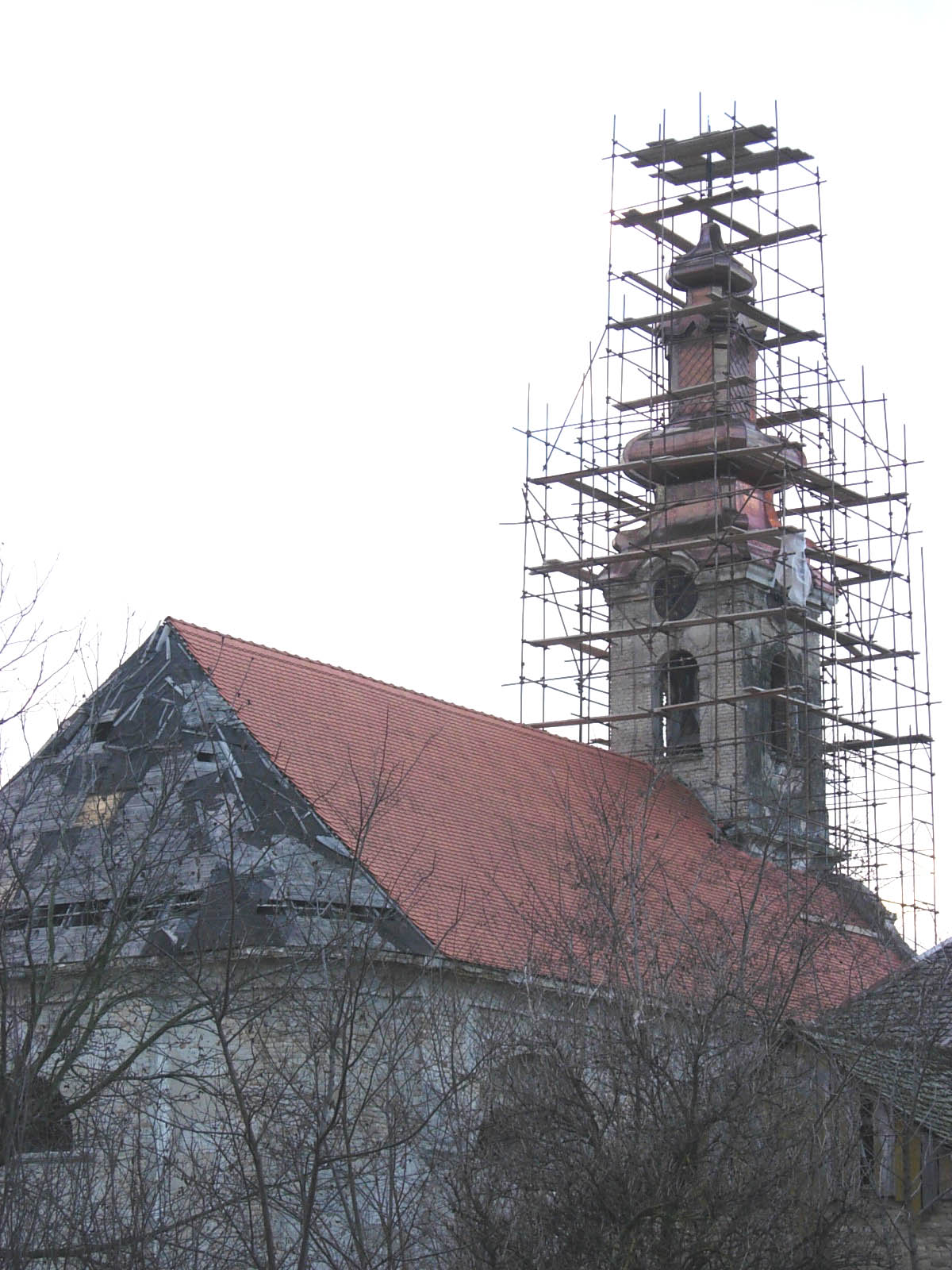
- The former Protestant Church, now Serbian Orthodox.

- Location within Vojvodina Location within Serbia Location within Europe
- Coordinates: 45°30′N 19°31′E
- Country: Serbia
- Province: Vojvodina
- Region: Bačka (Podunavlje)
- District: South Bačka
- Municipality: Vrbas

Population (2022)
  - Total: 2,562
- Time zone: UTC+1 (CET)
  - Summer (DST): UTC+2 (CEST)

Savino Selo (Serbian Cyrillic: Савино Село; Hungarian: Torzsa; Pannonian Rusyn: Савине Село), formerly Torschau / Torszà / Torša, is a village located in the municipality of Vrbas, South Bačka District, Vojvodina, Serbia.

== History ==
A settlement named Torsza was first mentioned in 1486. After the Turkish wars had ended by the late 17th century, the Bačka was widely deserted. During the reign of Emperor Josef II it was being repopulated by mostly Rhinehessian families, called Švabo (Danube Swabians) by their Serbian and Slovak neighbours. The village of Torschau (Hungarian Torszà, Serbian Torža) was built in 1784 by these German Protestant settlers, the first of seven newly founded German villages in the Batschka. 20 other German villages were restored and resettled. Over the years the village became ethnically mixed; until 1944 with a mainly German plus Serbian, Slovak and Hungarian population. In 1934 a monument was erected in remembrance of the village's 150 year long history. The Reformed Protestant church has recently been reconstructed and rededicated as Serbian Orthodox.

Savino Selo literally means "Sava's Village", and is today named after the legendary Montenegrin Partisan commander and war hero Sava Kovačević. During the last days of WWII, Torschau's German population fled in front of approaching Red Army units, mainly to Hungary, Austria and Germany. In 1945, colonisation of people from Bosnia and Montenegro (especially Vasojević clan) formed the current ethnic structure of the village.

== Demographics ==
=== Historical population ===
- 1961: 5,144
- 1971: 4,044
- 1981: 3,749
- 1991: 3,767
- 2002: 3,351
- 2011: 2,957
- 2022: 2,562

=== Ethnic groups ===
According to data from the 2022 census, ethnic groups in the village include:

- 1,399 (54.6%) Serbs
- 459 (17.9%) Montenegrins
- 123 (4.8%) Hungarians
- 122 (4.7%) Slovaks
- 56 (2.2%) Croats
- Others/Undeclared/Unknown

== See also ==
- List of places in Serbia
- List of cities, towns and villages in Vojvodina

== Gallery ==
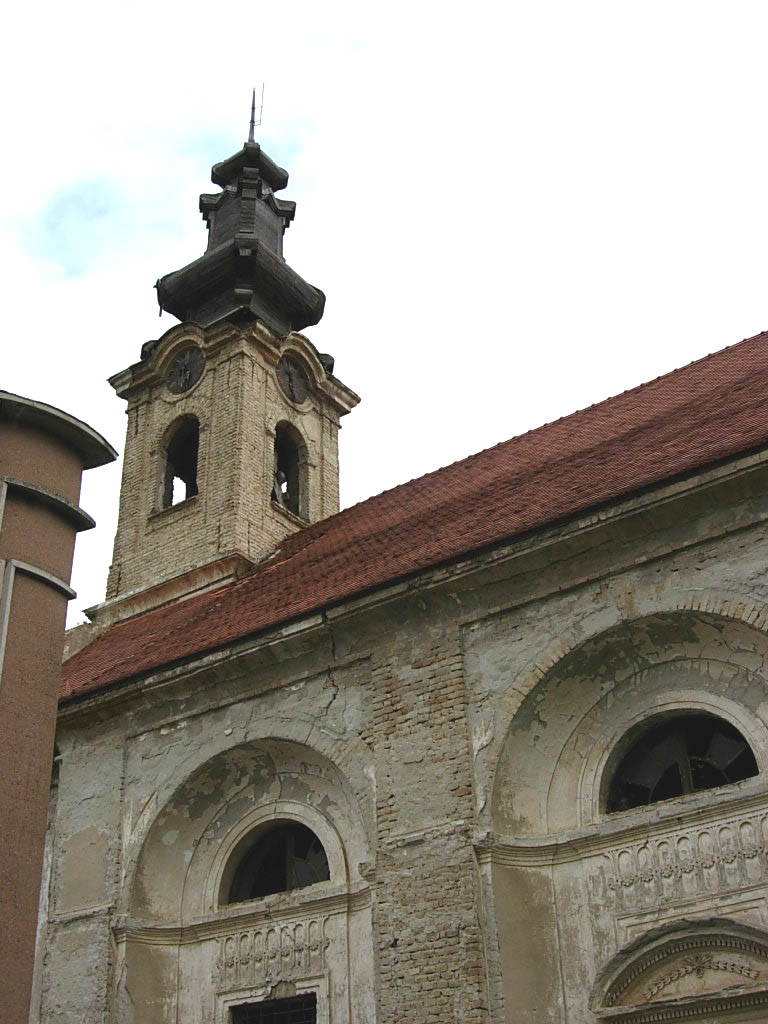
The Reformed Protestant Church.

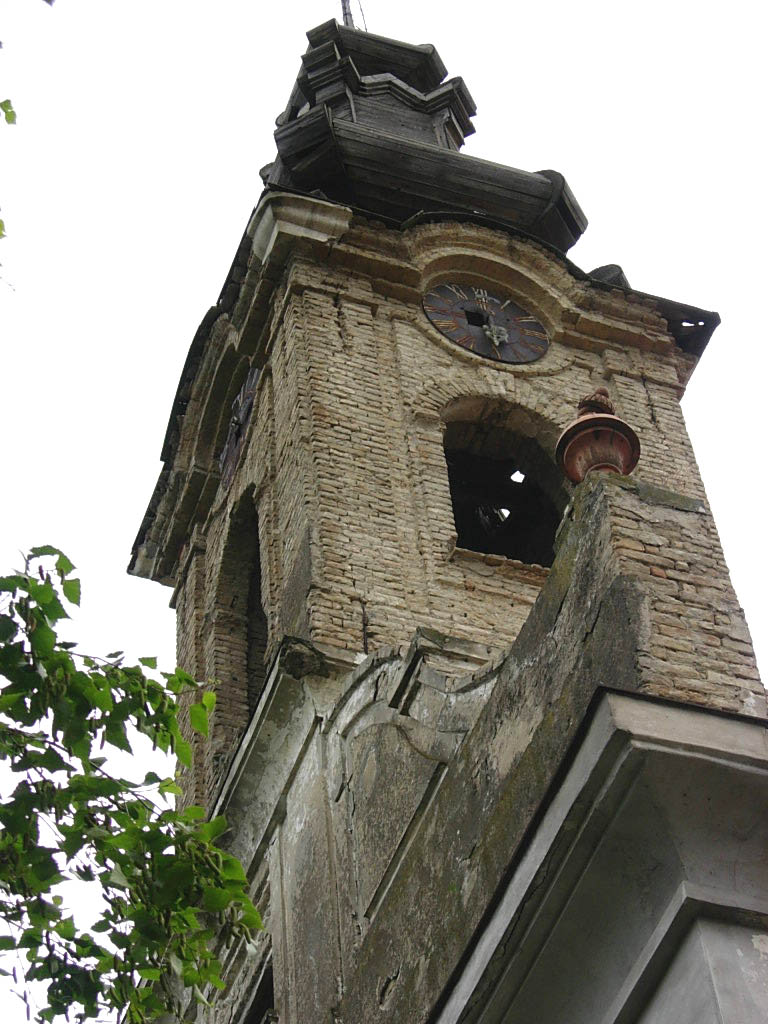
The steeple of the Reformed Protestant church.

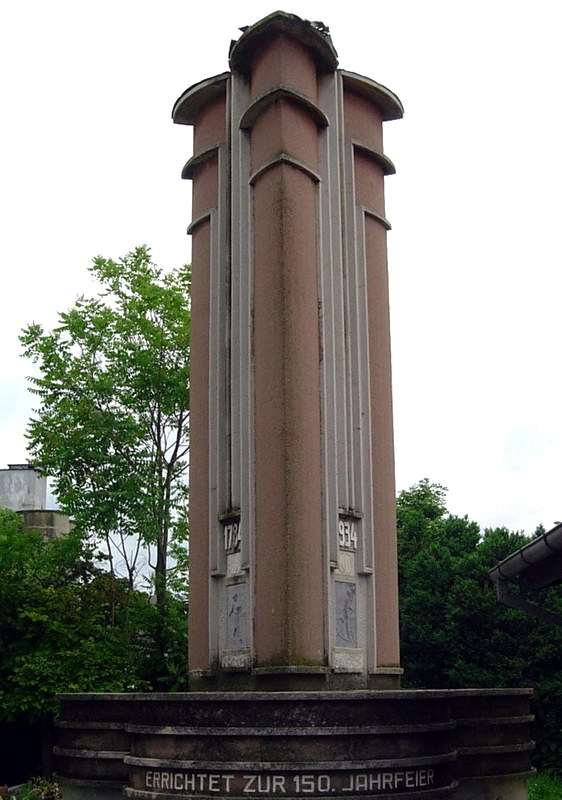
Monument in the village, commemorating German settlement.
