= Saint-Savin =

Saint-Savin is the name of several communes in France:

- Saint-Savin, Gironde
- Saint-Savin, Hautes-Pyrénées
- Saint-Savin, Isère
- Saint-Savin, Vienne, also referred to as Saint-Savin-sur-Gartempe
